= Atmosphere of Venus =

Gas layer surrounding Venus

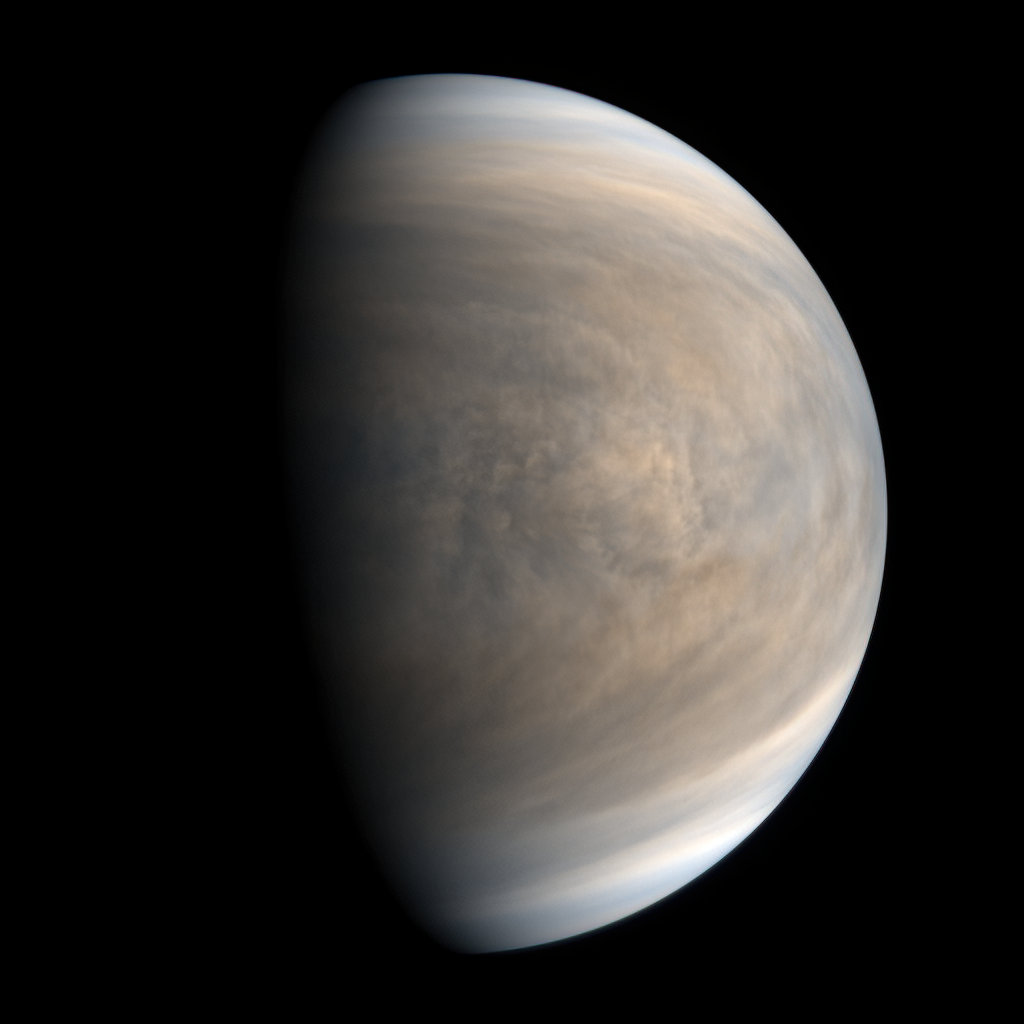
- Cloud structure in Venus's atmosphere revealed by ultraviolet observations

General information
- Height: 250 km (160 mi)
- Average surface pressure: 92 bar (1,330 psi)
- Mass: 4.8 × 10^{20} kg
- Chemical species: Molar fraction

Composition
- Carbon dioxide: 96.5 %
- Nitrogen: 3.5 %
- Sulfur dioxide: 150 ppm
- Argon: 70 ppm
- Water vapor: 20 ppm
- Carbon monoxide: 17 ppm
- Helium: 12 ppm
- Neon: 7 ppm
- Hydrogen chloride: 0.1–0.6 ppm
- Hydrogen fluoride: 0.001–0.005 ppm

The atmosphere of Venus is the very dense layer of gases surrounding the planet Venus. Venus's atmosphere is composed of 96.5% carbon dioxide and 3.5% nitrogen, with other chemical compounds present only in trace amounts. It is much denser and hotter than that of Earth; the temperature at the surface is 740 K (467 °C, 872 °F), and the pressure is 93 bar (9.3 MPa; 1,350 psi), roughly the pressure found 900 m (3,000 ft) under water on Earth. The atmosphere of Venus supports decks of opaque clouds of sulfuric acid that cover the entire planet, preventing, until recently, optical Earth-based and orbital observation of the surface. Information about surface topography was originally obtained exclusively by radar imaging. However, the Parker Solar Probe was able to capture images of the surface using infrared radiation and nearby visible light frequencies, confirming the topography.

Aside from the very surface layers, the atmosphere is in a state of vigorous circulation. The upper layer of troposphere exhibits a phenomenon of super-rotation, in which the atmosphere circles the planet in just four Earth days, much faster than the planet's sidereal day of 243 days. The winds supporting super-rotation blow at a speed of 100 m/s (≈360 km/h or 220 mph) or more. Winds move at up to 60 times the speed of the planet's rotation, while Earth's fastest winds are only 10% to 20% rotation speed. However, wind speed decreases with decreasing elevation to less than 2.8 m/s (≈10 km/h or 6.2 mph) on the surface. Near the poles are anticyclonic structures called polar vortices. Each vortex is double-eyed and shows a characteristic S-shaped pattern of clouds. Above there is an intermediate layer of mesosphere which separates the troposphere from the thermosphere. The thermosphere is also characterized by strong circulation, but very different in its nature—the gases heated and partially ionized by sunlight in the sunlit hemisphere migrate to the dark hemisphere where they recombine and downwell.

Unlike Earth, Venus lacks a magnetic field. Its ionosphere separates the atmosphere from outer space and the solar wind. This ionized layer excludes the solar magnetic field, giving Venus a distinct magnetic environment. This is considered Venus's induced magnetosphere. Lighter gases, including water vapour, are continuously blown away by the solar wind through the induced magnetotail. It is speculated that the atmosphere of Venus up to around 4 billion years ago was more like that of the Earth with liquid water on the surface. A runaway greenhouse effect may have been caused by the evaporation of the surface water and subsequent rise of the levels of other greenhouse gases.

Despite the harsh conditions on the surface, the atmospheric pressure and temperature at about 50 km to 65 km above the surface of the planet are nearly the same as that of the Earth, making its upper atmosphere the most Earth-like area in the Solar System beyond Earth, even more so than the surface of Mars. Due to the similarity in pressure and temperature and the fact that breathable air (21% oxygen, 78% nitrogen) is a lifting gas on Venus in the same way that helium is a lifting gas on Earth, the upper atmosphere has been proposed as a location for both exploration and colonization.

== History ==
Christiaan Huygens was the first to hypothesize the existence of an atmosphere on Venus. In the Book II of Cosmotheoros, published in 1698, he writes:

I have often wondered that when I have viewed Venus at her nearest to the Earth, when she resembled an Half-moon, just beginning to have something like Horns, through a Telescope of 45 or 60 Foot long, she always appeared to me all over equally lucid, that I can’t say I observ’d so much as one spot in her, tho in Jupiter and Mars, which seem much less to us, they are very plainly perceived. For if Venus had any such thing as Sea and Land, the former must necessarily show much more obscure than the other, as anyone may satisfy himself, that from a very high Mountain will but look down upon our Earth. I thought that perhaps the too brisk Light of Venus might be the occasion of this equal appearance; but when I used an Eye-glass that was smok’d for the purpose, it was still the same thing. What then, must Venus have no Sea, or do the Waters there reflect the Light more than ours do, or their Land less? or rather (which is most probable in my opinion) is not all that Light we see reflected from an Atmosphere surrounding Venus, which being thicker and more solid than that in Mars or Jupiter, hinders our seeing any thing of the Globe it self, and is at the same time capable of sending back the Rays that it receives from the Sun?

Decisive evidence for the atmosphere of Venus was provided by Mikhail Lomonosov, based on his observation of the transit of Venus in 1761 in a small observatory near his house in Saint Petersburg, Russia.

== Structure and composition ==
=== Composition ===
Composition of the atmosphere of Venus. The chart on the right is an expanded view of the trace elements that all together do not even make up a tenth of a percent.

The atmosphere of Venus is composed of 96.5% carbon dioxide, 3.5% nitrogen, and traces of other gases, most notably sulfur dioxide. The amount of nitrogen in the atmosphere is relatively small compared to the amount of carbon dioxide, but because the atmosphere is so much thicker than that on Earth, its total nitrogen content is roughly four times higher than Earth's, even though on Earth nitrogen makes up about 78% of the atmosphere.

The atmosphere contains a range of compounds in small quantities, including some based on hydrogen, such as hydrogen chloride (HCl) and hydrogen fluoride (HF). There is carbon monoxide, water vapour and atomic oxygen as well. Hydrogen is in relatively short supply in the Venusian atmosphere. A large amount of the planet's hydrogen is theorised to have been lost to space, with the remainder being mostly bound up in water vapour and sulfuric acid (H_{2}SO_{4}). Strong evidence of significant hydrogen loss over the historical evolution of the planet is the very high D–H ratio measured in the Venusian atmosphere. The ratio is about 0.015–0.025, which is 100–150 times higher than the terrestrial value of 1.6×10^{−4}. According to some measurements, in the upper atmosphere of Venus D/H ratio is 1.5 higher than in the bulk atmosphere.

Atmospheric composition

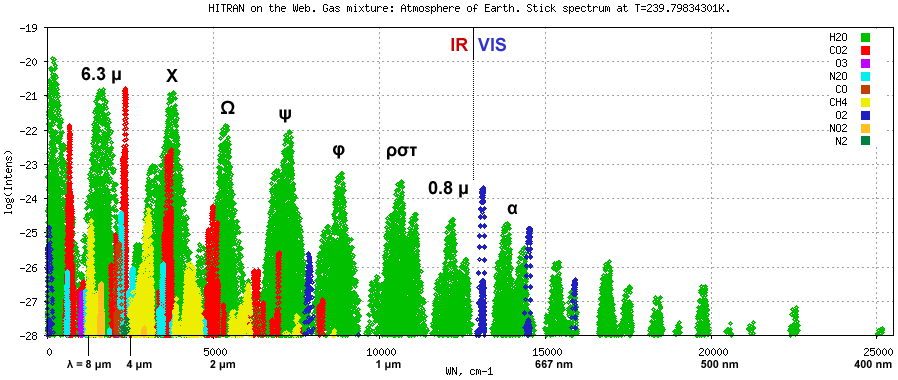
Absorption spectrum of a simple gas mixture corresponding to Earth's atmosphere

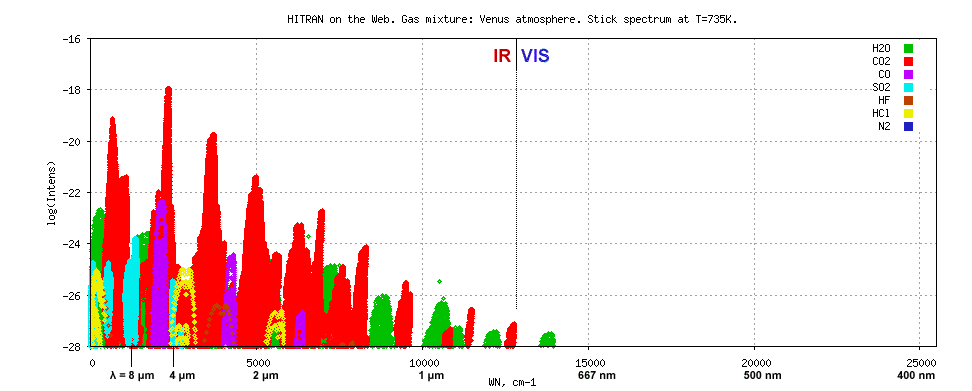
The composition of the atmosphere of Venus based on HITRAN data created using HITRAN on the Web system.

Green colour—water vapour, red—carbon dioxide, WN—wavenumber (other colours have different meanings, shorter wavelengths on the right, longer on the left).

==== Phosphine ====
In 2020, there was considerable discussion regarding whether phosphine (PH_{3}) might be present in trace amounts in Venus's atmosphere. This would be noteworthy as phosphine is a potential biomarker indicating the presence of life. This was prompted by an announcement in September 2020 that this compound had been detected in trace amounts. No known abiotic source present on Venus could produce phosphine in the quantities detected. On review, an interpolation error was discovered that resulted in multiple spurious spectroscopic lines, including the spectral feature of phosphine. Re-analysis of data with the fixed algorithm either do not result in the detection of the phosphine or detected it with much lower concentration of 1 ppb.

The announcement promoted re-analysis of Pioneer Venus data which found part of chlorine and all of hydrogen sulfide spectral features are instead phosphine-related, meaning lower than thought concentration of chlorine and non-detection of hydrogen sulfide. Another re-analysis of archived infrared spectral measurements by the NASA Infrared Telescope Facility in 2015 did not reveal any phosphine in the Venusian atmosphere, placing an upper limit for phosphine concentration at 5 ppb—a quarter of the spectroscopic value reported in September.

In 2022, no phosphine detection with an upper limit concentration of 0.8 ppb was announced for Venusian altitudes of 75–110 km.

In September 2024, the preliminary analysis of the JCMT-Venus data has confirmed the existence of phosphine in the atmosphere of Venus, with the concentration 300 ppb at altitude 55 km. Further data processing is still needed to measure phosphine concentration deeper in the Venusian cloud deck.

==== Ammonia ====
The ammonia in the atmosphere of Venus was tentatively detected by two atmospheric probes - Venera 8 and Pioneer Venus Multiprobe, although the detection was rejected that time due to poorly characterized sensors behavior in Venusian environment and ammonia believed to be chemically unstable in the strongly oxidizing atmosphere of Venus.

=== Troposphere ===
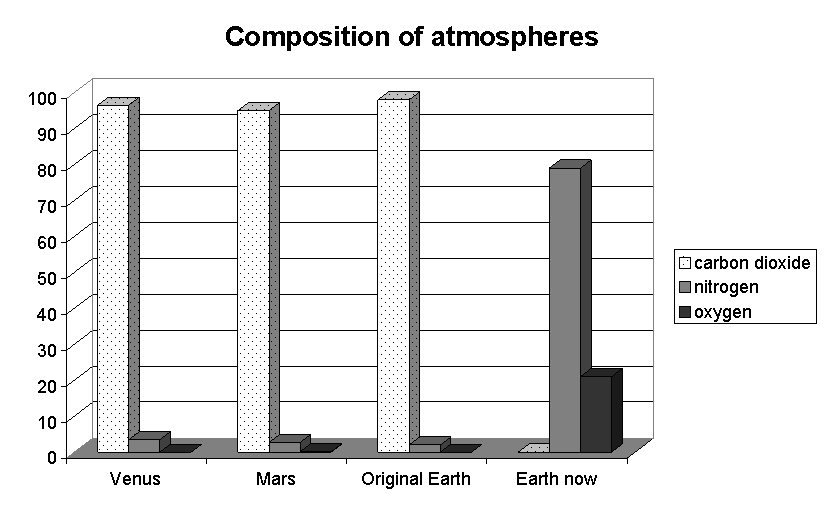
Comparison of Atmosphere Compositions – Venus, Mars, Earth (past and present).

The atmosphere is divided into a number of sections depending on altitude. The densest part of the atmosphere, the troposphere, begins at the surface and extends upwards to 65 km. The winds are slow near the surface, but at the top of the troposphere the temperature and pressure reaches Earth-like levels and clouds pick up speed to 100 m/s (360 km/h).

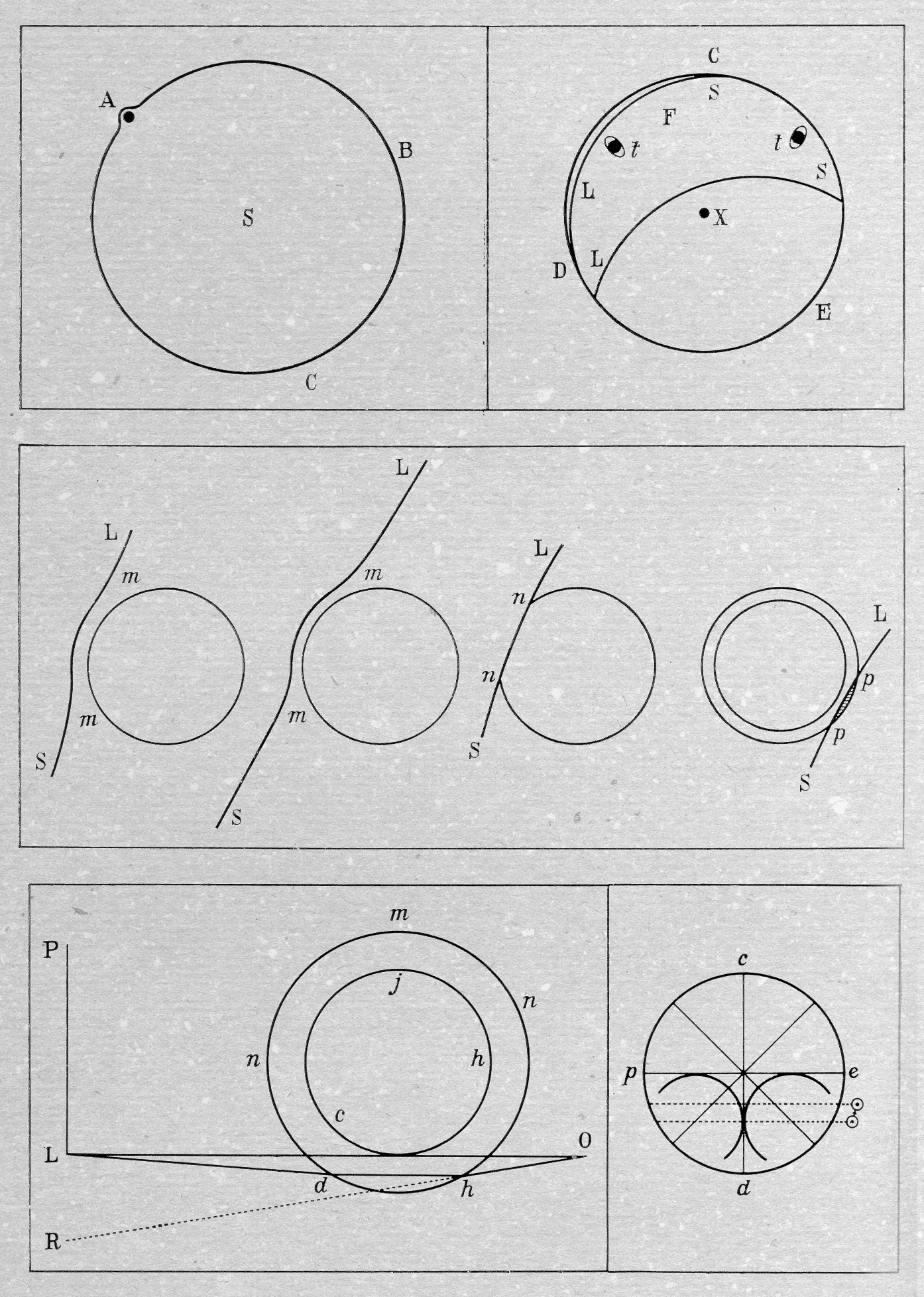
1761 drawing by Mikhail Lomonosov in his work on the discovery of atmosphere of Venus

The atmospheric pressure at the surface of Venus is about 92 times that of the Earth, similar to the pressure found 900 m (3,000 ft) below the surface of the ocean. The atmosphere has a mass of 4.8×10^{20} kg, about 93 times the mass of the Earth's total atmosphere. The density of the air at the surface is 65 kg/m^{3}, which is 6.5% that of liquid water on Earth. The pressure found on Venus's surface is high enough that the carbon dioxide is technically no longer a gas, but a supercritical fluid. This supercritical carbon dioxide forms a kind of sea, with 6.5% the density of water, that covers the entire surface of Venus. This sea of supercritical carbon dioxide transfers heat very efficiently, buffering the temperature changes between night and day (which last 56 terrestrial days). Particularly higher atmospheric pressures in Venus's past might have created an even more fluid-like layer of supercritical carbon dioxide shaping Venus's landscape; altogether, it is unclear how the supercritical environment behaves and is shaped.

The large amount of CO_{2} in the atmosphere together with water vapour and sulfur dioxide create a strong greenhouse effect, trapping solar energy and raising the surface temperature to around 740 K (467 °C), hotter than any other terrestrial planet in the Solar System, even that of Mercury despite being located farther out from the Sun and receiving only 25% of the solar energy (per unit area) Mercury does. The average temperature on the surface is above the melting points of lead (600 K, 327 °C), tin (505 K, 232 °C), and zinc (693 K, 420 °C). The thick troposphere also makes the difference in temperature between the day and night side small, even though the slow retrograde rotation of the planet causes a single solar day to last 116.5 Earth days. The surface of Venus spends 58.3 days in darkness before the sun rises again behind the clouds.

Atmosphere
Height (km)	Temp. (°C)	Atmospheric pressure (atm)
0	462	92.10
5	424	66.65
10	385	47.39
15	348	33.04
20	306	22.52
25	264	14.93
30	222	9.851
35	180	5.917
40	143	3.501
45	110	1.979
50	75	1.066
55	27	0.531 4
60	−10	0.235 7
65	−30	0.097 65
70	−43	0.036 90
80	−76	0.004 760
90	−104	0.000 373 6
100	−112	0.000 026 60

The troposphere on Venus contains 99% of the atmosphere by mass. 90% of the atmosphere of Venus is within 28 km (17.5 mi) of the surface; by comparison, 90% of the atmosphere of Earth is within 16 km (10 mi) of the surface. At a height of 50 km (31 mi) the atmospheric pressure is approximately equal to that at the surface of Earth. On the night side of Venus clouds can still be found at 80 km (50 mi) above the surface.

The altitude of the troposphere most similar to Earth is near the tropopause—the boundary between troposphere and mesosphere. It is located slightly above 50 km. According to measurements by the Magellan and Venus Express probes, the altitude from 52.5 to 54 km has a temperature between 293 K (20 °C) and 310 K (37 °C), and the altitude at 49.5 km above the surface is where the pressure becomes the same as Earth at sea level. As crewed ships sent to Venus would be able to compensate for differences in temperature to a certain extent, anywhere from about 50 to 54 km or so above the surface would be the easiest altitude in which to base an exploration or colony, where the temperature would be in the crucial "liquid water" range of 273 K (0 °C) to 323 K (50 °C) and the air pressure the same as habitable regions of Earth. As CO_{2} is heavier than air, the colony's air (nitrogen and oxygen) could keep the structure floating at that altitude like a dirigible.

==== Circulation ====
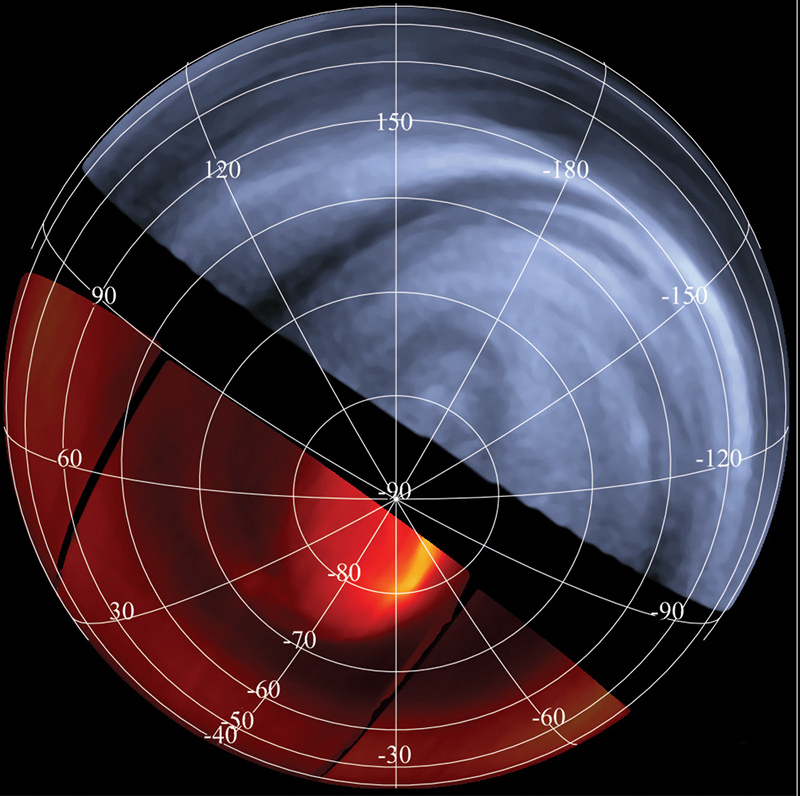
Composite image of the polar vortex of Venus in strong red (red image is an infrared view of hot high clouds and the grey image is an ultra-violet view of lower clouds)

The circulation in Venus's troposphere follows the so-called cyclostrophic flow. Its windspeeds are roughly determined by the balance of the pressure gradient and centrifugal forces in almost purely zonal flow. In contrast, the circulation in the Earth's atmosphere is governed by the geostrophic balance. Venus's windspeeds can be directly measured only in the upper troposphere (tropopause), between 60 and 70 km, altitude, which corresponds to the upper cloud deck. The cloud motion is usually observed in the ultraviolet part of the spectrum, where the contrast between clouds is the highest. The linear wind speeds at this level are about 100 ± 10 m/s at lower than 50° latitude. They are retrograde in the sense that they blow in the direction of the retrograde rotation of the planet. The winds quickly decrease towards the higher latitudes, eventually reaching zero at the poles. Such strong cloud-top winds cause a phenomenon known as the super-rotation of the atmosphere. In other words, these high-speed winds circle the whole planet faster than the planet itself rotates. The super-rotation on Venus is differential, which means that the equatorial troposphere super-rotates more slowly than the troposphere at the midlatitudes. The winds also have a strong vertical gradient. They decline deep in the troposphere with the rate of 3 m/s per km. The winds near the surface of Venus are much slower than that on Earth. They actually move at only a few kilometres per hour (generally less than 2 m/s and with an average of 0.3 to 1.0 m/s), but due to the high density of the atmosphere at the surface, this is still enough to transport dust and small stones across the surface, much like a slow-moving current of water.

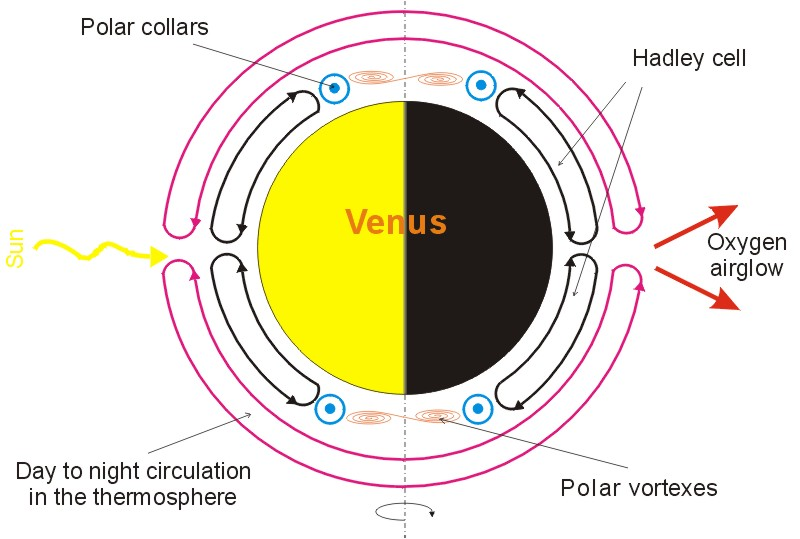
Meridional (north-south) component of the atmospheric circulation in the atmosphere of Venus. Note that the meridional circulation is much lower than the zonal circulation, which transports heat between the day and night sides of the planet

All winds on Venus are ultimately driven by convection. Hot air rises in the equatorial zone, where solar heating is concentrated and flows to the poles. Such an almost-planetwide overturning of the troposphere is called Hadley circulation. However, the meridional air motions are much slower than zonal winds. The poleward limit of the planet-wide Hadley cell on Venus is near ±60° latitudes. Here air starts to descend and returns to the equator below the clouds. This interpretation is supported by the distribution of the carbon monoxide, which is also concentrated in the vicinity of ±60° latitudes. Poleward of the Hadley cell a different pattern of circulation is observed. In the latitude range 60°–70° cold polar collars exist. They are characterized by temperatures about 30–40 K lower than in the upper troposphere at nearby latitudes. The lower temperature is probably caused by the upwelling of the air in them and by the resulting adiabatic cooling. Such an interpretation is supported by the denser and higher clouds in the collars. The clouds lie at 70–72 km altitude in the collars—about 5 km higher than at the poles and low latitudes. A connection may exist between the cold collars and high-speed midlatitude jets in which winds blow as fast as 140 m/s. Such jets are a natural consequence of the Hadley-type circulation and should exist on Venus between 55 and 60° latitude.

Odd structures known as polar vortices lie within the cold polar collars. They are giant hurricane-like storms four times larger than their terrestrial analogs. Each vortex has two "eyes"—the centres of rotation, which are connected by distinct S-shaped cloud structures. Such double eyed structures are also called polar dipoles. Vortices rotate with the period of about 3 days in the direction of general super-rotation of the atmosphere. The linear wind speeds are 35–50 m/s near their outer edges and zero at the poles. The temperature at the cloud-tops in each polar vortex is much higher than in the nearby polar collars, reaching 250 K (−23 °C). The conventional interpretation of the polar vortices is that they are anticyclones with downwelling in the centre and upwelling in the cold polar collars. This type of circulation resembles a winter polar anticyclonic vortex on Earth, especially the one found over Antarctica. The observations in the various infrared atmospheric windows indicate that the anticyclonic circulation observed near the poles penetrates as deep as to 50 km altitude, i.e. to the base of the clouds. The polar upper troposphere and mesosphere are extremely dynamic; large bright clouds may appear and disappear over the space of a few hours. One such event was observed by Venus Express between 9 and 13 January 2007, when the south polar region became brighter by 30%. This event was probably caused by an injection of sulfur dioxide into the mesosphere, which then condensed, forming a bright haze. The two eyes in the vortices have yet to be explained.

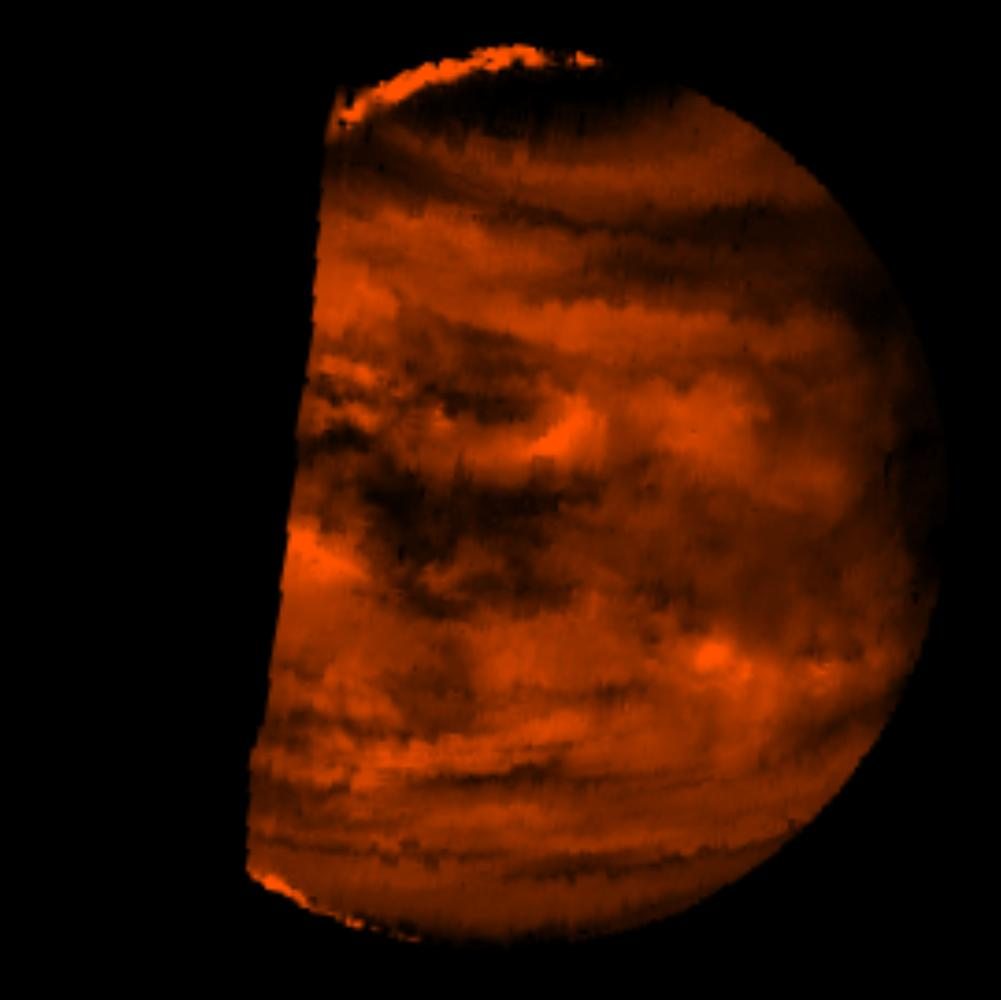
False colour near-infrared (2.3 μm) image of the deep atmosphere of Venus obtained by Galileo, red areas are signatures of the hot surface radiating through the atmosphere relatively unhindered. The dark spots are clouds silhouetted against the very hot lower atmosphere emitting thermal infrared radiation.

The first vortex on Venus was discovered at the north pole by the Pioneer Venus mission in 1978. A discovery of the second large "double-eyed" vortex at the south pole of Venus was made in the summer of 2006 by Venus Express, which came with no surprise.

Images from the Akatsuki orbiter revealed something similar to jet stream winds in the low and middle cloud region, which extends from 45 to 60 km in altitude. The wind speed maximized near the equator. In September 2017, JAXA scientists named this phenomenon "Venusian equatorial jet".

=== Upper atmosphere and ionosphere ===
The mesosphere of Venus extends from 65 km to 120 km in height, and the thermosphere begins at approximately 120 km, eventually reaching the upper limit of the atmosphere (exosphere) at about 220 to 350 km. The exosphere begins when the atmosphere becomes so thin that the average number of collisions per air molecule is less than one.

The mesosphere of Venus can be divided into two layers: the lower one between 62 and 73 km and the upper one between 73 and 95 km. In the first layer the temperature is nearly constant at 230 K (−43 °C). This layer coincides with the upper cloud deck. In the second layer, the temperature starts to decrease again, reaching about 165 K (−108 °C) at the altitude of 95 km, where mesopause begins. It is the coldest part of the Venusian dayside atmosphere. In the dayside mesopause, which serves as a boundary between the mesosphere and thermosphere and is located between 95 and 120 km, temperature increases to a constant—about 300–400 K (27–127 °C)—value prevalent in the thermosphere. In contrast, the nightside Venusian thermosphere is the coldest place on Venus with temperature as low as 100 K (−173 °C). It is even called a cryosphere.

The circulation patterns in the upper mesosphere and thermosphere of Venus are completely different from those in the lower atmosphere. At altitudes 90–150 km the Venusian air moves from the dayside to nightside of the planet, with upwelling over sunlit hemisphere and downwelling over dark hemisphere. The downwelling over the nightside causes adiabatic heating of the air, which forms a warm layer in the nightside mesosphere at the altitudes 90–120 km. The temperature of this layer—230 K (−43 °C)—is far higher than the typical temperature found in the nightside thermosphere—100 K (−173 °C). The air circulated from the dayside also carries oxygen atoms, which after recombination form excited molecules of oxygen in the long-lived singlet state (^{1}Δ_{g}), which then relax and emit infrared radiation at the wavelength 1.27 μm. This radiation from the altitude range 90–100 km is often observed from the ground and spacecraft. The nightside upper mesosphere and thermosphere of Venus is also the source of non-local thermodynamic equilibrium emissions of CO_{2} and nitric oxide molecules, which are responsible for the low temperature of the nightside thermosphere.

The Venus Express probe has shown through stellar occultation that the atmospheric haze extends much further up on the night side than the day side. On the day side the cloud deck has a thickness of 20 km and extends up to about 65 km, whereas on the night side the cloud deck in the form of a thick haze reaches up to 90 km in altitude—well into mesosphere, continuing even further to 105 km as a more transparent haze. In 2011, the spacecraft discovered that Venus has a thin ozone layer at an altitude of 100 km.

Venus has an extended ionosphere located at altitudes 120–300 km. The ionosphere almost coincides with the thermosphere. The high levels of the ionization are maintained only over the dayside of the planet. Over the nightside the concentration of the electrons is almost zero. The ionosphere of Venus consists of three layers: v1 between 120 and 130 km, v2 between 140 and 160 km and v3 between 200 and 250 km. There may be an additional layer near 180 km. The maximum electron volume density (number of electrons in a unit of volume) of 3×10^{11} m^{−3} is reached in the v2 layer near the subsolar point. The upper boundary of the ionosphere (the ionopause) is located at altitudes 220–375 km and separates the plasma of the planetary origin from that of the induced magnetosphere. The main ionic species in the v1 and v2 layers is O_{2}^{+} ion, whereas the v3 layer consists of O^{+} ions. The ionospheric plasma is observed to be in motion; solar photoionization on the dayside and ion recombination on the nightside are the processes mainly responsible for accelerating the plasma to the observed velocities. The plasma flow appears to be sufficient to maintain the nightside ionosphere at or near the observed median level of ion densities.

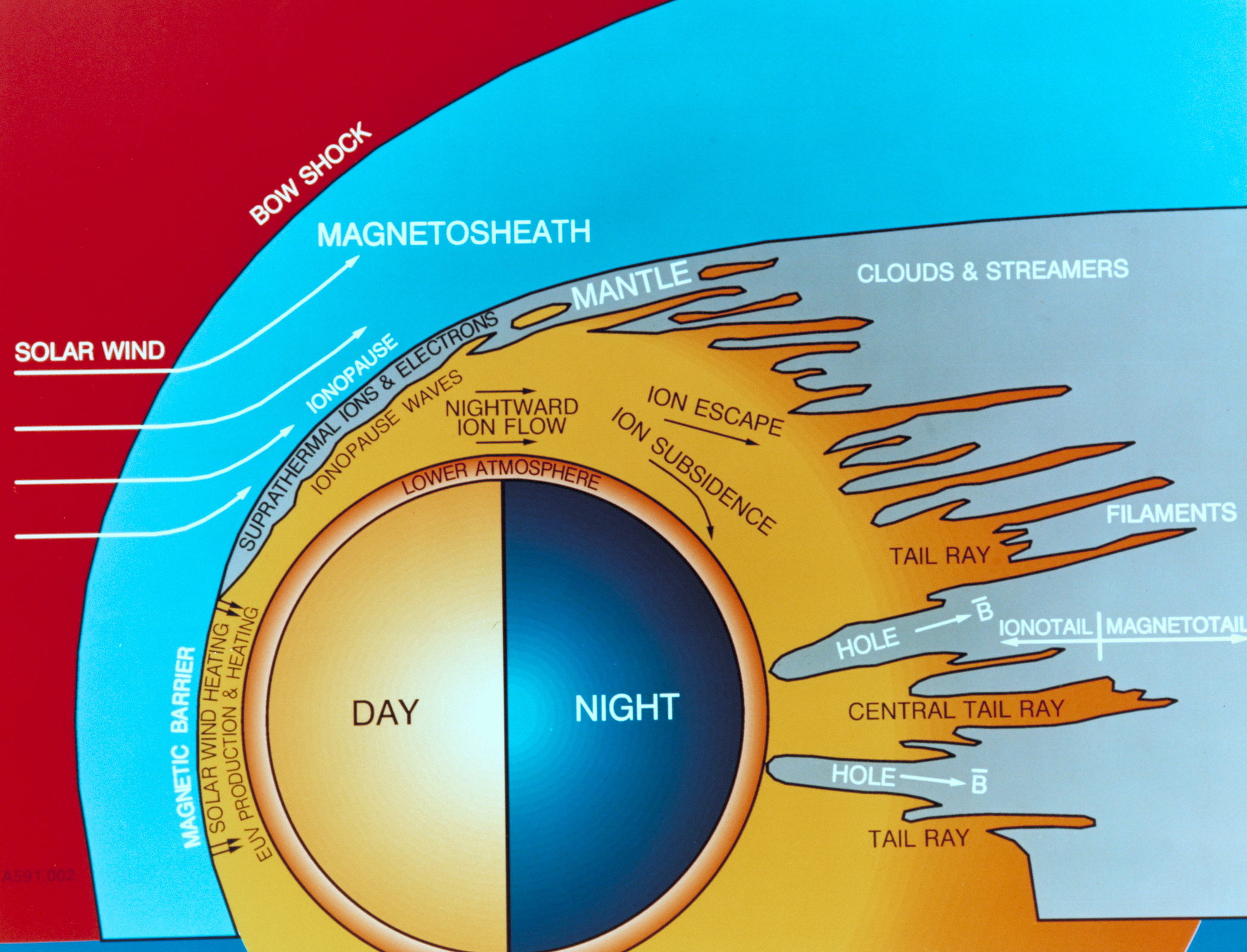
The ionosphere of Venus and its interaction with the solar wind.

=== Induced magnetosphere ===
Venus interacts with the solar wind. Components of the induced magnetosphere are shown.

Venus is known not to have a magnetic field. The reason for its absence is not at all clear, but it may be related to a reduced intensity of convection in the Venusian mantle. Venus only has an induced magnetosphere formed by the Sun's magnetic field carried by the solar wind. This process can be understood as the field lines wrapping around an obstacle—Venus in this case. The induced magnetosphere of Venus has a bow shock, magnetosheath, magnetopause and magnetotail with the current sheet.

At the subsolar point the bow shock stands 1900 km (0.3 R_{v}, where R_{v} is the radius of Venus) above the surface of Venus. This distance was measured in 2007 near the solar activity minimum. Near the solar activity maximum it can be several times further from the planet. The magnetopause is located at the altitude of 300 km. The upper boundary of the ionosphere (ionopause) is near 250 km. Between the magnetopause and ionopause there exists a magnetic barrier—a local enhancement of the magnetic field, which prevents the solar plasma from penetrating deeper into the Venusian atmosphere, at least near solar activity minimum. The magnetic field in the barrier reaches up to 40 nT. The magnetotail continues up to ten radii from the planet. It is the most active part of the Venusian magnetosphere. There are reconnection events and particle acceleration in the tail. The energies of electrons and ions in the magnetotail are around 100 and 1000 eV respectively.

Due to the lack of the intrinsic magnetic field on Venus, the solar wind penetrates relatively deep into the planetary exosphere and causes substantial atmosphere loss. The loss happens mainly via the magnetotail. Currently the main ion types being lost are O^{+}, H^{+} and He^{+}. The ratio of hydrogen to oxygen losses is around 2 (i.e. almost stoichiometric for water) indicating the ongoing loss of water.

== Clouds ==
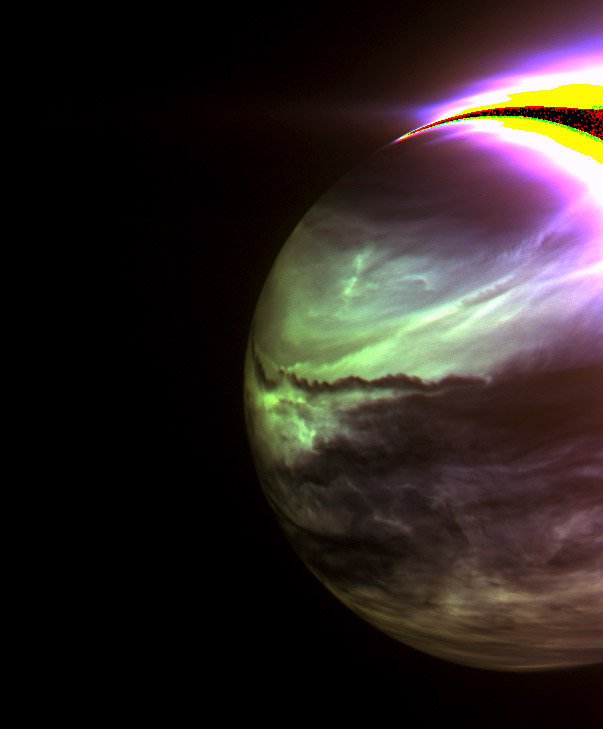
Infrared image of the night-side of Venus, showing different layers of clouds at altitudes of 35 to 50 km in different colours. Red coloured clouds are the highest, green and blue are below. Carbon dioxide and monoxide areas are absorbing infrared signatures.

Venusian clouds are thick and are composed mainly (75–96%) of sulfuric acid droplets. These clouds obscure the surface of Venus from optical imaging, and reflect about 75% of the sunlight that falls on them. The geometric albedo, a common measure of reflectivity, is the highest of any planet in the Solar System. This high reflectivity potentially enables any probe exploring the cloud tops sufficient solar energy such that solar cells can be fitted anywhere on the craft. The density of the clouds is highly variable with the densest layer at about 48.5 km, reaching 0.1 g/m^{3} similar to the lower range of cumulonimbus storm clouds on Earth.

The cloud cover is such that it reflects more than 60% of the solar light Venus receives, leaving the surface with typical light levels of 14,000 lux, comparable to that on Earth "in the daytime with overcast clouds". The equivalent visibility is about three kilometers, but this will likely vary with the wind conditions. Little to no solar energy could conceivably be collected by solar panels on a surface probe. In fact, due to the thick, highly reflective cloud cover, the total solar energy received by the surface of the planet is less than that of the Earth, despite its proximity to the Sun.

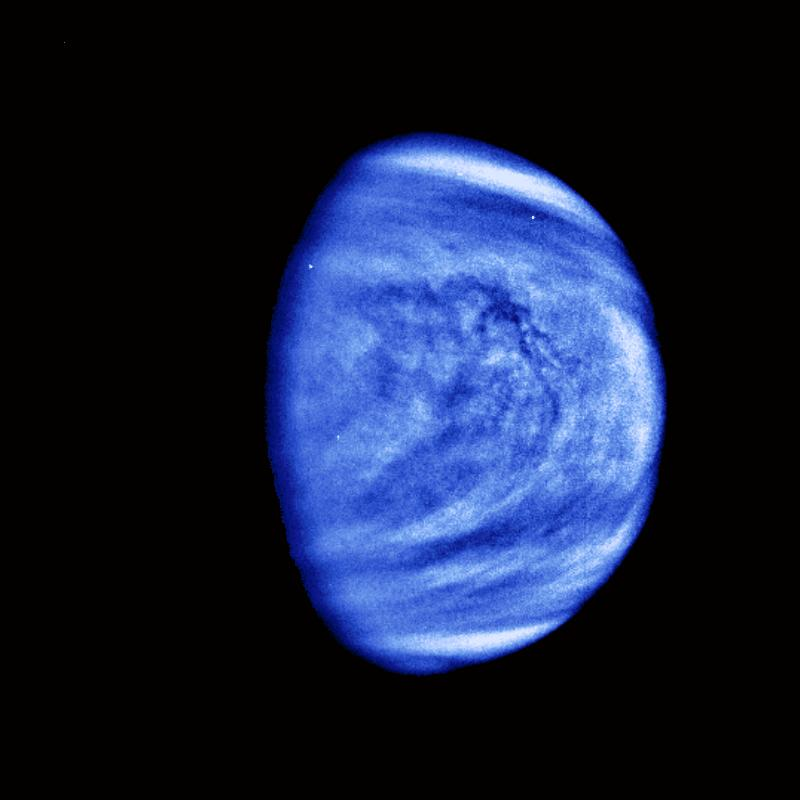
Photograph taken by the uncrewed Galileo space probe en route to Jupiter in 1990 during a Venus flyby. Smaller-scale cloud features have been emphasized and a bluish hue has been applied to show that it was taken through a violet filter.

Sulfuric acid is produced in the upper atmosphere by the Sun's photochemical action on carbon dioxide, sulfur dioxide, and water vapour. Ultraviolet photons of wavelengths less than 169 nm can photodissociate carbon dioxide into carbon monoxide and monatomic oxygen. Monatomic oxygen is highly reactive; when it reacts with sulfur dioxide, a trace component of the Venusian atmosphere, the result is sulfur trioxide, which can combine with water vapour, another trace component of Venus's atmosphere, to yield sulfuric acid.

CO_{2} → CO + O
SO_{2} + O → SO_{3}
2 SO_{3} + 4 H_{2}O → 2 H_{2}SO_{4} · H_{2}O

Surface level humidity is less than 0.1%. Venus's sulfuric acid rain never reaches the ground, but is evaporated by the heat before reaching the surface in a phenomenon known as virga. It is theorized that early volcanic activity released sulfur into the atmosphere and the high temperatures prevented it from being trapped into solid compounds on the surface as it was on the Earth. Besides sulfuric acid, cloud droplets can contain a wide array of sulfate salts, raising pH of droplet to 1.0 in one of scenarios explaining the sulfur dioxide measurements.

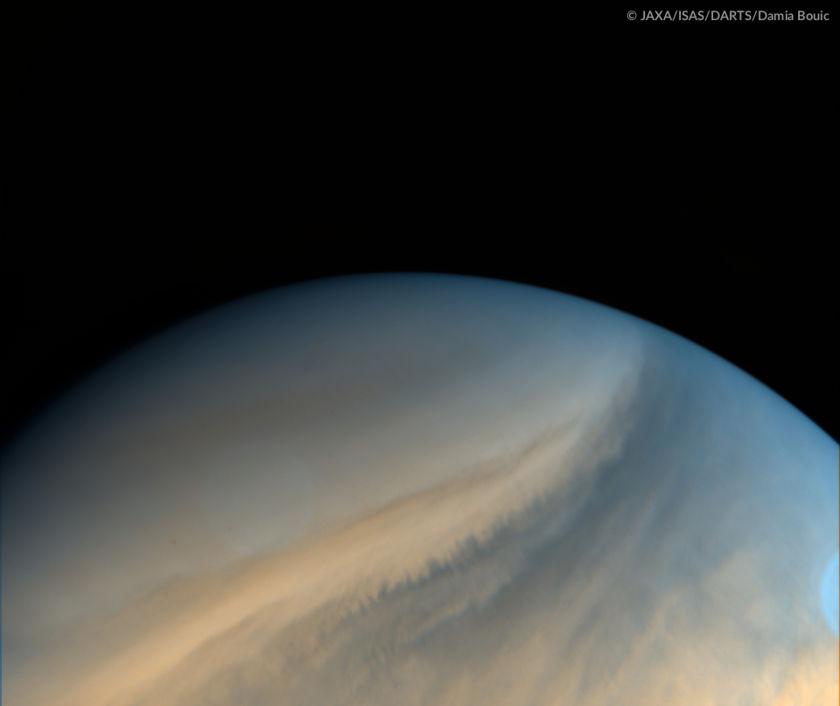
Close-up view of a cloud front encircling Venus's south polar vortex in morning infrared and ultra-violet light

In 2009, a prominent bright spot in the atmosphere was noted by an amateur astronomer and photographed by Venus Express. Its cause is currently unknown, with surface volcanism advanced as a possible explanation.

=== Lightning ===
The clouds of Venus may be capable of producing lightning, but the debate is ongoing, with volcanic lightning and sprites also under discussion. The Soviet Venera 9 and 10 orbiters obtained ambiguous optical and electromagnetic evidence of lightning. There have been attempts to observe lightning from the Venera 11, 12, 13, and 14 landers, however no lightning activity was recorded, but very low frequency (VLF) waves were detected during descent. The European Space Agency's Venus Express in 2007 detected whistler waves which could be attributed to lightning. Their intermittent appearance suggests a pattern associated with weather activity. According to the whistler observations, the lightning rate is at least half of that on Earth and may possibly be similar. However, the Venus Express findings are incompatible with data from the JAXA Akatsuki spacecraft which indicate a very low flash rate. Recent work from a Parker Solar Probe flyby indicates that the direction of the whistler waves is towards Venus rather than away, indicating a non-planetary origin.

The Pioneer Venus Orbiter (PVO) was equipped with an electric field detector specifically to detect lightning and the Venera 13 and 14 missions included a radio receiver and point discharge sensor to search for thunderstorms. Other missions equipped with instruments that could search for lightning included Venera 9 which had a visible spectrometer; Pioneer which had a star sensor; and VEGA which had a photometer.

The mechanism generating lightning on Venus, if present, remains unknown. Whilst the sulfuric acid cloud droplets can become charged, the atmosphere may be too electrically conductive for the charge to be sustained, preventing lightning.

Lightning could potentially contribute to atmospheric chemistry, through making the molecules present in the atmosphere (carbon dioxide, nitrogen gas, sulfur dioxide, sulfuric acid and water) dissociate into atoms and ions, which then recombine to form new molecules (carbon oxides and suboxides, sulfur oxides, oxygen, elemental sulfur, nitrogen oxides, sulfuric acid clusters, carbon soot, etc.). Lightning could contribute to the production of carbon monoxide and oxygen gas by converting sulfur and sulfur dioxide into sulfuric acid, and water and sulfuric dioxide to sulfur to sustain clouds. Regardless of how frequent lightning on Venus is, it is important to study as it can be a potential hazard for spacecraft.

Throughout the 1980s, it was thought that the cause of the night-side glow ("ashen light") on Venus was lightning however, there may be the possibility that Venus lightning would be too weak to cause it.

== Possibility of life ==
Due to the harsh conditions on the surface, little of the planet has been explored; in addition to the fact that life as currently understood may not necessarily be the same in other parts of the universe, the extent of the tenacity of life on Earth itself has not yet been shown. Creatures known as extremophiles exist on Earth, preferring extreme habitats. Thermophiles and hyperthermophiles thrive at temperatures reaching above the boiling point of water, acidophiles thrive at a pH level of 3 or below, polyextremophiles can survive a varied number of extreme conditions, and many other types of extremophiles exist on Earth.

The surface temperature of Venus (over 450 °C) is far beyond the extremophile range, which extends only tens of degrees beyond 100 °C. However, the lower temperature of the cloud tops means that life could plausibly exist there, the same way that bacteria have been found living and reproducing in clouds on Earth. Any such bacteria living in the cloud tops, however, would have to be hyper-acidophilic, due to the concentrated sulfuric acid environment. Microbes in the thick, cloudy atmosphere could be protected from solar radiation by the sulfur compounds in the air.

The Venusian atmosphere has been found to be sufficiently out of equilibrium as to require further investigation. Analysis of data from the Venera, Pioneer, and Magellan missions has found hydrogen sulfide (later disputed) and sulfur dioxide (SO_{2}) together in the upper atmosphere, as well as carbonyl sulfide (OCS). The first two gases react with each other, implying that something must produce them. Carbonyl sulfide is difficult to produce inorganically, but it is present in the Venusian atmosphere. However, the planet's volcanism could explain the presence of carbonyl sulfide. In addition, one of the early Venera probes detected large amounts of toxic chlorine just below the Venusian cloud deck.

It has been proposed that microbes at this level could be soaking up ultraviolet light from the Sun as a source of energy, which could be a possible explanation for the "unknown UV absorber" seen as dark patches on UV images of the planet. The existence of this "unknown UV absorber" prompted Carl Sagan to publish an article in 1963 proposing the hypothesis of microorganisms in the upper atmosphere as the agent absorbing the UV light. In 2012, the abundance and vertical distribution of these unknown ultraviolet absorbers in the Venusian atmosphere have been investigated from analysis of Venus Monitoring Camera images, but their composition is still unknown. In 2016, disulfur dioxide was identified as a possible candidate for causing the so far unknown UV absorption of the Venusian atmosphere. The dark patches of "unknown UV absorbers" are prominent enough to influence the weather on Venus. In 2021, it was suggested the color of "unknown UV absorber" match that of "red oil" –a known substance comprising a mixed organic carbon compounds dissolved in concentrated sulfuric acid.

In September 2020, research studies led by Cardiff University using the James Clerk Maxwell and ALMA radio telescopes noted the detection of phosphine in Venus's atmosphere that was not linked to any known abiotic method of production present, or possible under Venusian conditions. It is extremely hard to make, and the chemistry in the Venusian clouds should destroy the molecules before they could accumulate to the observed amounts. The phosphine was detected at heights of at least 48 km above the surface of Venus, and was detected primarily at mid-latitudes with none detected at the poles of Venus. Scientists note that the detection itself could be further verified beyond the use of multiple telescopes detecting the same signal, as the phosphine fingerprint described in the study could theoretically be a false signal introduced by the telescopes or by data processing. The detection was later suggested to be a false positive or true signal with much over-estimated amplitude, compatible with 1 ppb concentration of phosphine. The re-analysis of ALMA dataset in April 2021 have recovered the 20 ppb phosphine signal, with signal-to-noise ratio of 5.4, and by August 2021 it was confirmed the suspected contamination by sulfur dioxide was contributing only 10% to the tentative signal in phosphine spectral line band.

== Evolution ==
Through studies of the present cloud structure and geology of the surface, combined with the fact that the luminosity of the Sun has increased by 25% since around 3.8 billion years ago, it is thought that the early environment of Venus was more like that of Earth with liquid water on the surface. At some point in the evolution of Venus, a runaway greenhouse effect occurred, leading to the current greenhouse-dominated atmosphere. The timing of this transition away from Earthlike is not known, but is estimated to have occurred around 4 billion years ago. The runaway greenhouse effect may have been caused by the evaporation of the surface water and the rise of the levels of greenhouse gases that followed. Venus's atmosphere has therefore received a great deal of attention from those studying climate change on Earth.

There are no geologic forms on the planet to suggest the presence of water over the past billion years. However, there is no reason to suppose that Venus was an exception to the processes that formed Earth and gave it its water during its early history, possibly from the original rocks that formed the planet or later on from comets. The common view among research scientists is that water would have existed for about 600 million years on the surface before evaporating, though some such as David Grinspoon believe that up to 2 billion years could also be plausible. This longer timescale for the persistence of oceans is also supported by General Circulation Model simulations incorporating the thermal effects of clouds on an evolving Venusian hydrosphere.

The early Earth during the Hadean eon is believed by most scientists to have had a Venus-like atmosphere, with roughly 100 bar of CO_{2} and a surface temperature of 230 °C, and possibly even sulfuric acid clouds, until about 4.0 billion years ago, by which time plate tectonics were in full force and together with the early water oceans, removed the CO_{2} and sulfur from the atmosphere. Early Venus would thus most likely have had water oceans like the Earth, but any plate tectonics would have ended when Venus lost its oceans. Its surface is estimated to be about 500 million years old, so it would not be expected to show evidence of plate tectonics.

== Observations and measurement from Earth ==
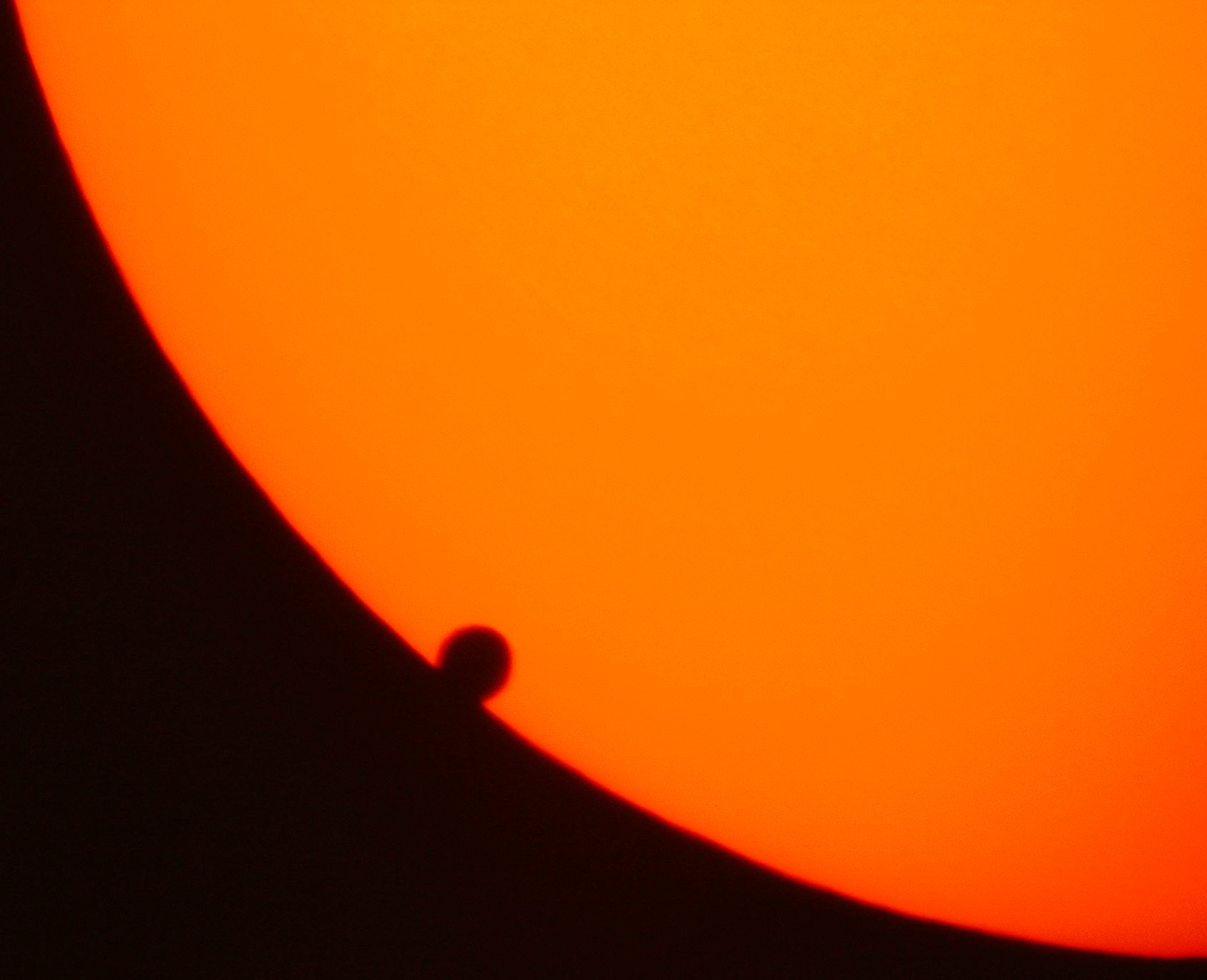
Venus transits the face of the Sun on June 8, 2004, providing valuable information on the upper atmosphere through spectroscopic measurements from Earth

In 1761, Russian polymath Mikhail Lomonosov observed an arc of light surrounding the part of Venus off the Sun's disc at the beginning of the egress phase of the transit and concluded that Venus has an atmosphere. In 1940, Rupert Wildt calculated that the amount of CO_{2} in the Venusian atmosphere would raise surface temperature above the boiling point for water. This was confirmed when Mariner 2 made radiometer measurements of the temperature in 1962. In 1967, Venera 4 confirmed that the atmosphere consisted primarily of carbon dioxide.

The upper atmosphere of Venus can be measured from Earth when the planet crosses the sun in a rare event known as a solar transit. The last solar transit of Venus occurred in 2012. Using quantitative astronomical spectroscopy, scientists were able to analyze sunlight that passed through the planet's atmosphere to reveal chemicals within it. As the technique to analyse light to discover information about a planet's atmosphere only first showed results in 2001, this was the first opportunity to gain conclusive results in this way on the atmosphere of Venus since observation of solar transits began. This solar transit was a rare opportunity considering the lack of information on the atmosphere between 65 and 85 km. The solar transit in 2004 enabled astronomers to gather a large amount of data useful not only in determining the composition of the upper atmosphere of Venus, but also in refining techniques used in searching for extrasolar planets. The atmosphere of mostly CO_{2}, absorbs near-infrared radiation, making it easy to observe. During the 2004 transit, the absorption in the atmosphere as a function of wavelength revealed the properties of the gases at that altitude. The Doppler shift of the gases also enabled wind patterns to be measured.

A solar transit of Venus is an extremely rare event, and the last solar transit of the planet before 2004 was in 1882. The most recent solar transit was in 2012; the next one will not occur until 2117.

== Space missions ==
=== Recent and current spaceprobes ===
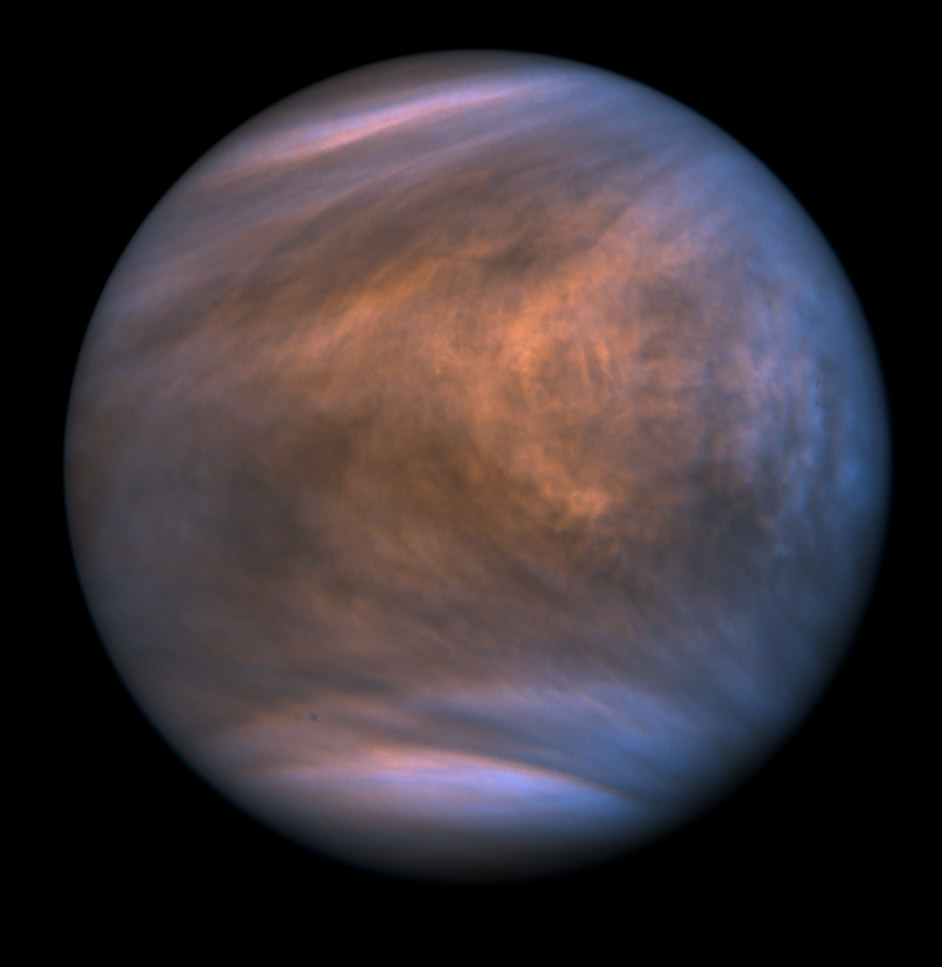
This image shows Venus in ultraviolet, seen by the Akatsuki mission.

The Venus Express spacecraft formerly in orbit around the planet probed deeper into the atmosphere using infrared imaging spectroscopy in the 1–5 μm spectral range.

The JAXA probe Akatsuki (Venus Climate Orbiter), launched in May 2010, studied the planet for a period of two years, including the structure and activity of the atmosphere, but failed to enter Venus orbit in December 2010. A second attempt to achieve orbit succeeded 7 December 2015. Designed specifically to study the planet's climate, Akatsuki is the first meteorology satellite to orbit Venus (the first for a planet other than Earth). One of its five cameras known as the "IR2" will be able to probe the atmosphere of the planet underneath its thick clouds, in addition to its movement and distribution of trace components. With a highly eccentric orbit (periapsis altitude of 400 km and apoapsis of 310,000 km), it was able to take close-up photographs of the planet, and also confirm the presence of both active volcanoes as well as lightning.

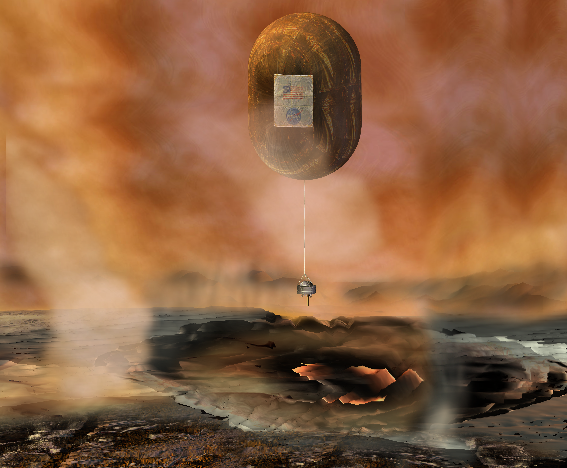
Venus In-Situ Explorer proposed by NASA's New Frontiers program

=== Proposed missions ===
The Venus In-Situ Explorer, proposed by NASA's New Frontiers program is a proposed probe which would aid in understanding the processes on the planet that led to climate change, as well as paving the way towards a later sample return mission.

A craft called the Venus Mobile Explorer has been proposed by the Venus Exploration Analysis Group (VEXAG) to study the composition and isotopic measurements of the surface and the atmosphere, for about 90 days. The mission has not been selected for launch.

After missions discovered the reality of the harsh nature of the planet's surface, attention shifted towards other targets such as Mars. There have been a number of proposed missions afterward, however, and many of these involve the little-known upper atmosphere. The Soviet Vega program in 1985 dropped two balloons into the atmosphere, but these were battery-powered and lasted for only about two Earth days each before running out of power. Since then, there has been no exploration of the upper atmosphere. In 2002, the NASA contractor Global Aerospace proposed a balloon that would be capable of staying in the upper atmosphere for hundreds of Earth days as opposed to two.

A solar flyer has also been proposed by Geoffrey A. Landis in place of a balloon, and the idea has been featured from time to time since the early 2000s. Venus has a high albedo, and reflects most of the sunlight that shines on it making the surface quite dark, the upper atmosphere at 60 km has an upward solar intensity of 90%, meaning that solar panels on both the top and the bottom of a craft could be used with nearly equal efficiency. In addition to this, the slightly lower gravity, high air pressure and slow rotation allowing for perpetual solar power make this part of the planet ideal for exploration. The proposed flyer would operate best at an altitude where sunlight, air pressure, and wind speed would enable it to remain in the air perpetually, with slight dips down to lower altitudes for a few hours at a time before returning to higher altitudes. As sulfuric acid in the clouds at this height is not a threat for a properly shielded craft, this so-called "solar flyer" would be able to measure the area in between 45 km and 60 km indefinitely, for however long it takes for mechanical error or unforeseen problems to cause it to fail. Landis also proposed that rovers similar to Spirit and Opportunity could possibly explore the surface, with the difference being that Venus surface rovers would be "dumb" rovers controlled by radio signals from computers located in the flyer above, only requiring parts such as motors and transistors to withstand the surface conditions, but not weaker parts involved in microelectronics that could not be made resistant to the heat, pressure and acidic conditions.

Russian space science plans include the launch of the Venera-D (Venus-D) probe in 2029. The main scientific goals of the Venera-D mission are investigation of the structure and chemical composition of the atmosphere and investigation of the upper atmosphere, ionosphere, electrical activity, magnetosphere, and escape rate. It has been proposed to fly together with Venera-D an inflatable aircraft designed by Northrop Grumman, called Venus Atmospheric Maneuverable Platform (VAMP).

The High Altitude Venus Operational Concept (HAVOC) is a NASA concept for a crewed exploration of Venus. Rather than traditional landings, it would send crews into the upper atmosphere, using dirigibles. Other proposals from the late 2010s include VERITAS, Venus Origins Explorer, VISAGE, and VICI. In June 2018, NASA also awarded a contract to Black Swift Technologies for a concept study of a Venus glider that would exploit wind shear for lift and speed.

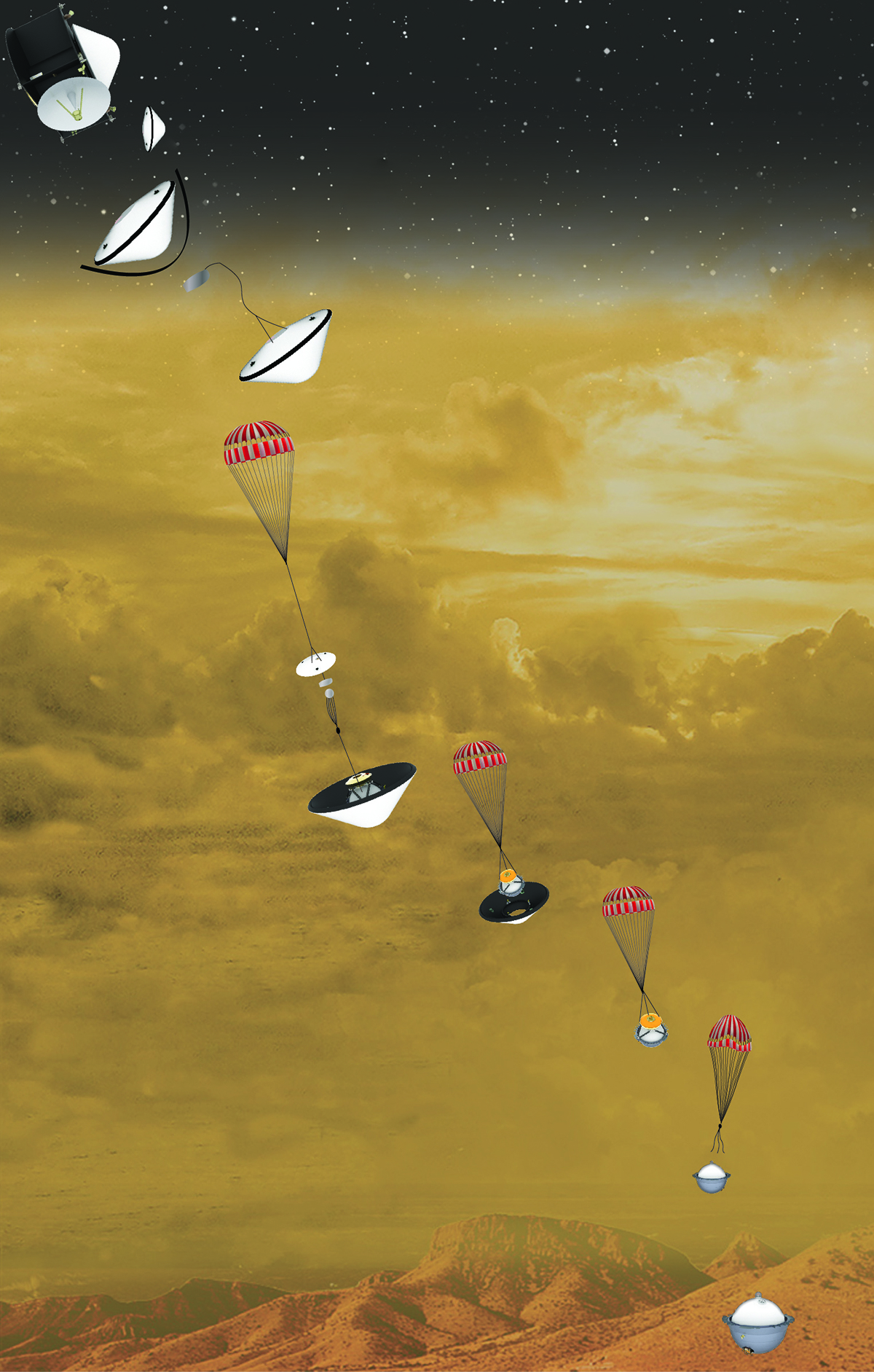
Artist's concept of the planned DAVINCI+ probe's descent stages through Venus's atmosphere

In June 2021, NASA selected the DAVINCI+ mission to send an atmospheric probe to Venus in the late 2020s. DAVINCI+ will measure the composition of Venus's atmosphere to understand how it formed and evolved, as well as determine whether the planet ever had an ocean. The mission consists of a descent sphere that will plunge through the planet's thick atmosphere, measuring noble gases and other elements to understand Venus's climate change. This will be the first U.S.-led mission to Venus's atmosphere since 1978.

== See also ==
- Aerospace architecture
