= MoonRise =

Proposed NASA mission to the Moon

- Mission type: Lunar sample return
- Operator: NASA / Jet Propulsion Laboratory

Start of mission
- Rocket: Atlas V 531
- Launch site: Cape Canaveral SLC-41
- Contractor: United Launch Alliance (for launch)

MoonRise was a robotic mission concept to the south pole of the Moon. It was proposed in 2010 and 2017 for NASA's New Frontiers program mission 3 and 4, respectively, but it was not selected. If funded and launched by another NASA opportunity, it would focus on the giant South Pole–Aitken basin (SPA basin) on the far side of the Moon between the Moon's South Pole and Aitken Crater, 16° south of the Moon's equator. This basin measures nearly 2,500 kilometres (1,600 mi) in diameter and 12 kilometres (7.5 mi) in depth. This region is the oldest and deepest observable impact basin on the Moon and provides a window into the deep crust of the Moon and its history as a result. The basin is also among the largest recognized impact structures in the Solar System.

MoonRise was not selected for the third New Frontiers program mission 3, losing out to the OSIRIS-REx asteroid sample return mission, and it lost again in the 2017 competition for New Frontiers program mission 4. In February 2025, the recommended mission themes for New Frontiers program mission 5 were revised, with the SPA basin lunar sample return concept proposed to no longer be eligible.

== Science objectives ==
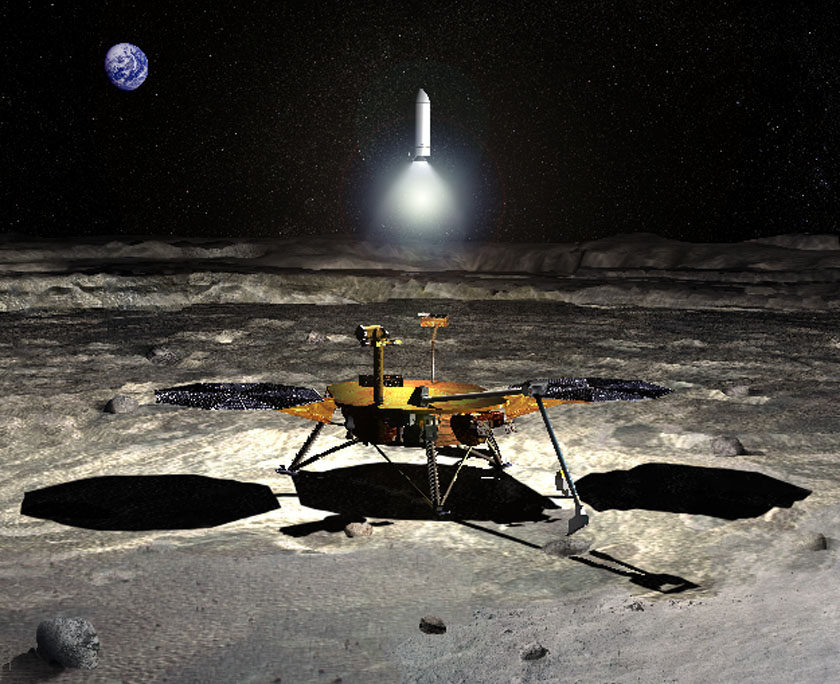
Possible configuration of a lunar sample return craft for Aitken basin

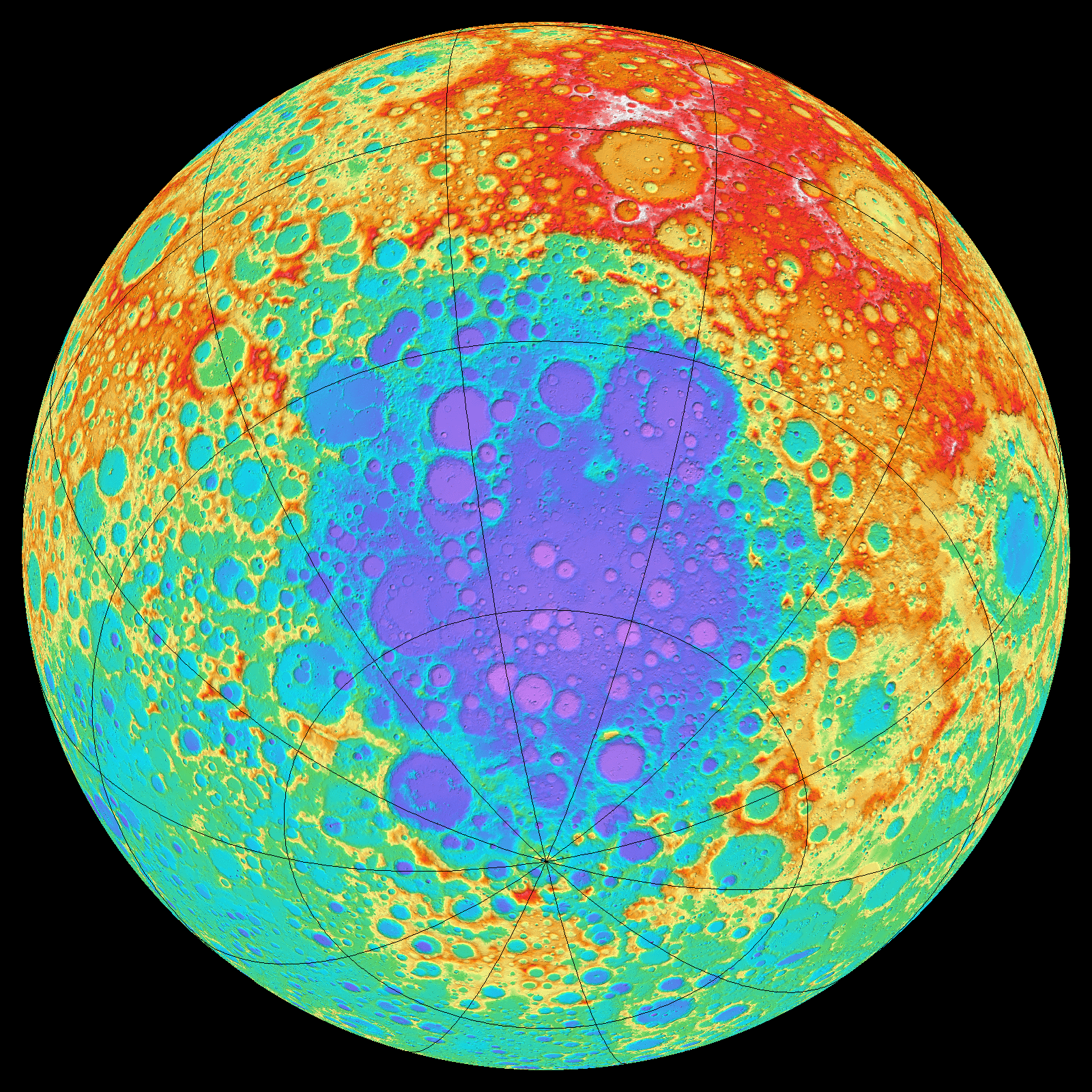
South Pole–Aitken basin

MoonRise has the following objectives:

- Determine the impact chronology of the SPA basin
- Investigate processes associated with the formation of large impact basins
- Investigate the materials excavated from the deeper crust, and possibly the mantle, of the Moon within the SPA basin
- Determine rock types, distribution of thorium, and implications for the Moon's thermal evolution
- Sample and analyze basaltic rock and volcanic glass, which record the composition and chemical evolution of the Moon's far-side mantle beneath the SPA basin

== Future prospects ==
MoonRise received Phase A funding out of the New Frontiers program. The study was one of three concepts to get US$3.3 million funding in 2010 to further develop the mission for the final selection, which was a US$650 million mission to launch in the late 2010s. The three semi-finalists were MoonRise, the OSIRIS-REx sample return mission, and the Venus In Situ Explorer mission.

Although MoonRise was passed over in favor of OSIRIS-REx in the 2011 selection, a South Pole–Aitken basin sample return mission had been part of the 2013–2022 Planetary Science Decadal Survey's recommendation for potential New Frontiers mission 5, and NASA's Planetary Science Division has expressed support for the Decadal Survey's recommendations. In February 2025, given the aging of the 2013–2022 Decadal Survey, the recommended mission themes for the fifth New Frontiers mission were revised, with the SPA basin lunar sample return concept proposed to no longer be eligible. The successor to the 2013–2022 Decadal Survey, the 2023–2032 Decadal Survey, continued to endorse the SPA sample return concept (i.e., the Endurance Rover mission concept) but recommended it be considered by NASA's Lunar Discovery and Exploration Program rather than New Frontiers.

== See also ==
- Origin of the Moon
- Stardust, a 1999 cometary coma sample return mission
