= Venus Atmospheric Maneuverable Platform =

Proposed robotic semi-buoyant flying wing aircraft to study Venus's atmosphere

Venus Atmospheric Maneuverable Platform (VAMP) is a mission concept by the aerospace companies Northrop Grumman and LGarde for a powered, long endurance, semi-buoyant inflatable aircraft that would explore the upper atmosphere of planet Venus for biosignatures as well as perform atmospheric measurements. The inflatable aircraft has a trapezoidal shape that is sometimes called delta wing or flying wing, and would have dual electric-driven propellers that would be stowed during atmospheric entry.

The aircraft is proposed to be launched as a secondary payload on another spacecraft mission to Venus, probably on Russia's Venera-D in 2029. During daytime, VAMP would be able to make continuous science measurements, while at night the vehicle would descend to 50 km altitude where it would be fully buoyant, remain at a lower-power state, and still perform modest science measurements at the float altitude. The lower cloud layer of Venus, located between 47.5 and 50.5 km altitude, is acidic, but it is considered by some astrobiologists to be a target for exploration due to the favorable conditions for microbial life, including moderate temperatures and pressures (~60 °C and 1 atm).

== Overview ==
=== Science driver ===
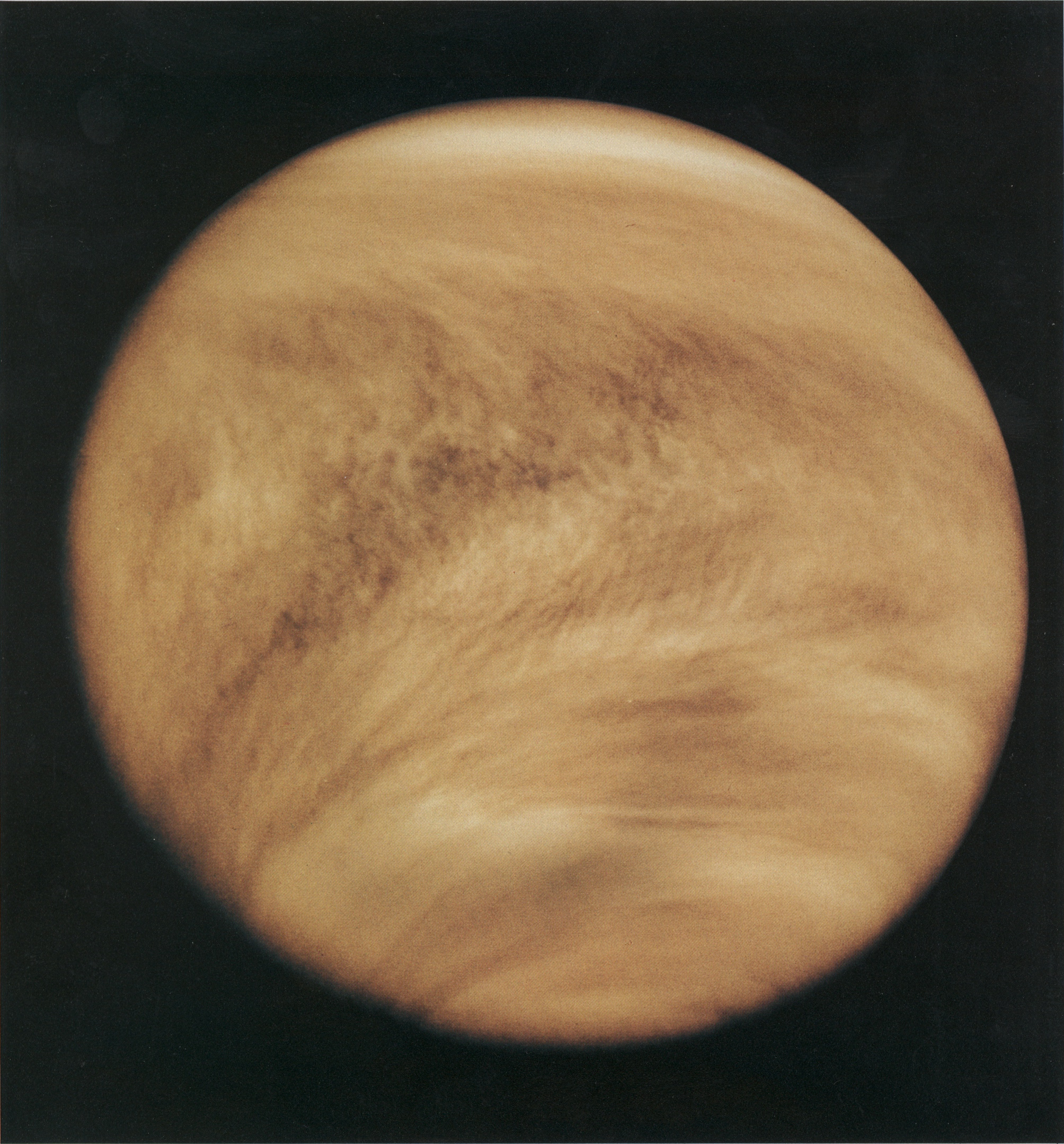
Cloud structure in Venus's atmosphere in 1979, revealed by ultraviolet observations from Pioneer Venus Orbiter. The dark areas contain an unidentified component that absorbs UV light.

The habitability of Venus's clouds has been a subject of discussion since scientists Harold Morowitz and Carl Sagan speculated it in 1967. Since then, subsequent studies have highlighted the potential for microbial habitability in Venus's cloud layers due to favorable chemical and physical conditions, including the presence of sulfur compounds, carbon dioxide (CO_{2}), water, and moderate temperatures (0–60 °C) and pressures (~0.4–2 atm). The surface conditions on the planet, however, are known to be inhospitable, with temperatures above 450 °C (860 °F).

Ultraviolet (UV) imaging of Venus reveals localised areas at cloud altitude that causes absorption between 330 and 500 nm. The Venus UV contrasts were first observed in Earth-based photographs in 1928 and subsequently measured by ground-based polarimetry in 1974, spectroscopy in 1978, and by spacecraft since 2008. Despite spacecraft investigations from orbit by Venus Express, Akatsuki and MESSENGER, and Venera entry probes (Venera program) spectroscopic observations show that the dark patches are composed of concentrated sulfuric acid and other unknown light-absorbing particles, but the chemical and physical properties of these contrasts are still unknown.

Since some models suggest Venus once had a habitable climate with liquid water on its surface for as long as 2 billion years, it is speculated by some scientists that these absorption features could be caused by large masses of microorganisms suspended in the lower cloud layer, and hypothetically thrive on iron- and sulfur-centered metabolism. On Earth, some extremophile bacteria can thrive in very acidic conditions, can feed on carbon dioxide, and excrete sulfuric acid.

== Aircraft ==
Preliminary parameters	Units
Wingspan	55 m
Length	20 m
Mass	900 kg
Payload mass	≈50 kg
Payload volume	≈30 m^{3}
Solar array power	≥ 8 kW
Buoyancy gas	Hydrogen
Maximum speed	30 m/s (110 km/h)
Propulsion	Two electric-driven propellers Diameter: 2.93 m (96") each 2 blades each Thrust: 90 - 100 lbf
Skin	Entry heating: Nextel fabric and Pyrogel laminate Sulfuric acid and solar heat: Teflon PFA-AI-Vectran

The Venus Atmospheric Maneuverable Platform (VAMP) concept started in 2012 through a collaboration between aerospace companies Northrop Grumman and LGarde, and it consists of an inflatable semi-buoyant aircraft with a science payload that can perform in situ measurements of Venus's atmosphere. The aircraft is scalable; the smaller version would have a wingspan of 6 m, and mass of 90 kg including instruments; a medium-sized would have 30 m wingspan and 450 kg mass, while the full-scale version has a wingspan of 55 m and a 900 kg mass.

VAMP would be deployed in space by the orbiting mothership, inflate, and fly into Venus's atmosphere without an aeroshell. The aircraft would be 10% buoyant, and would be able to cruise at 110 km/h when using propulsion and therefore, providing 90% of lift. The power source would be solar arrays and batteries.

When not propelled, the aircraft sinks to an altitude of ≈55 km above the ground, where it reaches 100% buoyancy. A passively floating vehicle also simplifies operations at night, as well as safe-mode procedures for recovery. The aircraft would be able to operate from several months to one year, and must be supported by an orbiting communications relay satellite for interactive -but not in real time- control. VAMP would fly at altitudes between 50 and 65 km and would cover a wide range of latitudes and all longitudes. There is ongoing research on the shape of the aircraft, its deployment, and resistance of different envelope membranes to the chemical (acid) and thermal environment of Venus. The team is also assessing the use of a lenticular shape which would significantly simplify packing, deployment sequence and structural mass, but it would not cruise so efficiently.

The vehicle concept was also presented in May 2017 as a proof-of-concept for exploration of other planets and moons of the Solar System with an atmosphere.

== Science payload ==
The 2013 preliminary concept envisions a suite of instruments NASA calls the 'Venus Flagship Design Reference Mission' for a balloon. Its mass is estimated at 20 kg and would require 50 W of electrical power to operate. The notional instruments consist of:

- Cameras
- Noble gas spectrometer
- UV spectrometer
- Meteorological station
- Attenuated Total Reflection
- Gas Chromatograph / Mass Spectrometer (GC/MS)
- Polarization nephelometer
- 3D Ultrasonic anemometer
- Electric field sensor
- Optical microscope

== Potential missions ==
Venera-D

There are ongoing discussions about possible NASA participation in Russia's Venera-D mission, scheduled for the late 2020s. In 2014, Russian scientists asked NASA if they would be interested in collaborating some instruments to the mission. Under this collaboration, Venera-D could incorporate some US components, including balloons, a subsatellite, a long-lived (24 hours) surface station, or a maneuverable aerial platform. Any potential collaboration is still under discussion.

The engineers working on the VAMP concept state that the aircraft is scalable, so a "medium size" version could potentially fly along on the Venera-D mission. This version would have a wingspan of 30 m and a mass of 450 kg, including instruments.

New Frontiers program

Northrop Grumman is also planning on entering NASA's New Frontiers program competition. If selected, it could be awarded up to $1 billion for design maturation, development, launch, and operations. However, it has been noted by experts that as proposed, VAMP cannot answer all key questions required by the NASA-chartered Venus Exploration Analysis Group's (VEXAG) 2014 science roadmap, and would be missing surface measurements and measurements of the surface's interaction with the atmosphere.

== See also ==
- Aerobot
- Atmosphere of Venus
- Life on Venus
- Mars Aerial and Ground Global Intelligent Explorer
- Observations and explorations of Venus
