= Venus In situ Composition Investigations =

Concept lander mission to Venus

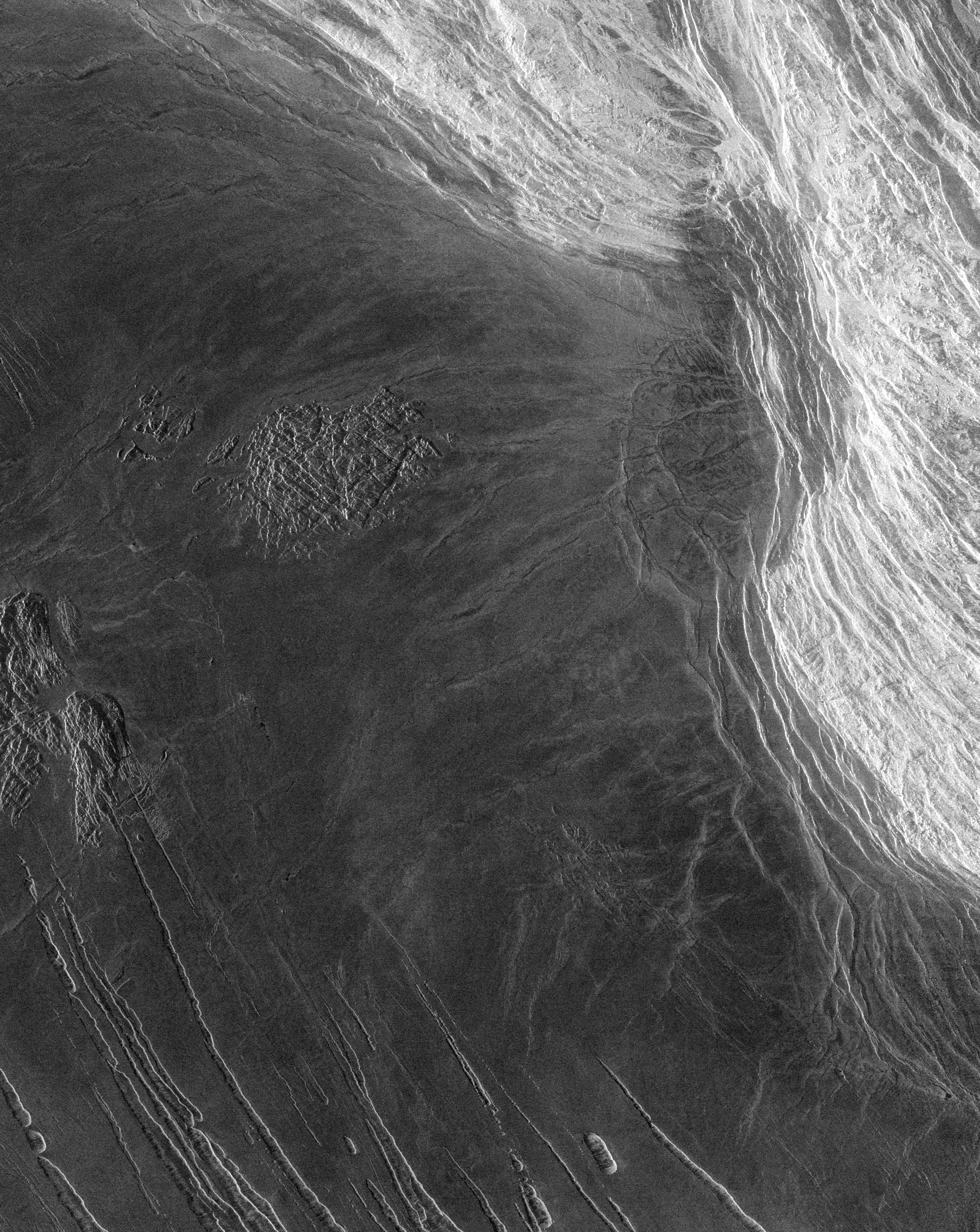
Tessera terrain in the Maxwell Montes seen in white on the right of the image. Eastern edge of Lakshmi Planum seen in gray on the left.

Model of crustal plateau and tessera terrain formation via mantle downwelling after Gilmore (1998).

Venus In situ Composition Investigations (VICI) is a concept lander mission to Venus in order to answer long-standing questions about its origins and evolution, and provide new insights needed to understand terrestrial planet formation, evolution, and habitability.

VICI was one of 12 considerations for New Frontiers 4, but was not one of the two missions selected to be finalists in late 2017.

== Overview ==
The mission concept was proposed in 2017 to NASA's New Frontiers program to compete for funding and development, but it was not selected. However, on 20 December 2017, it was awarded technology development funds to prepare it for future mission competitions. The funds are meant to further develop the Venus Element and Mineralogy Camera to operate under the extreme heat and pressure on Venus. The instrument uses lasers on a lander to measure the mineralogy and elemental composition of rocks on the surface of Venus.

If selected and developed at some future opportunity, the VICI mission would send two identical landers to unexplored Tesserae regions thought to be ancient exposed surfaces that had not undergone volcanic resurfacing. The two landers would measure atmospheric composition and structure during their descent at a level of detail that has not been possible on earlier missions. The landers would also analyze surface chemistry, mineralogy, and morphology at their landing site.

== Scientific payload ==
VICI's proposed payloads includes a copy of the neutral mass spectrometer and tunable laser spectrometer currently used by the Curiosity rover to provide surface mineralogy and elemental composition. A gamma-ray spectrometer would perform measurements of naturally radioactive elements to a depth of ~10 cm.

== See also ==
- Venus In Situ Atmospheric and Geochemical Explorer (VISAGE), a competing mission concept to Venus
- Venus In Situ Explorer (VISE), a concept mission to Venus
- Venus Origins Explorer (VOX), a competing mission concept to Venus
