= Venus In Situ Atmospheric and Geochemical Explorer =

Proposed NASA Venus lander mission

- Names: VISAGE
- Mission type: Reconnaissance
- Operator: NASA
- Mission duration: cruise: 12 months lander: 4.5 hours

Venus lander

Venus In Situ Atmospheric and Geochemical Explorer (VISAGE) is a proposed Venus lander mission that would perform atmospheric and surface science investigations.

The mission was proposed in 2017 to NASA's New Frontiers program to compete for funding and development, but it was not selected.

== Overview ==
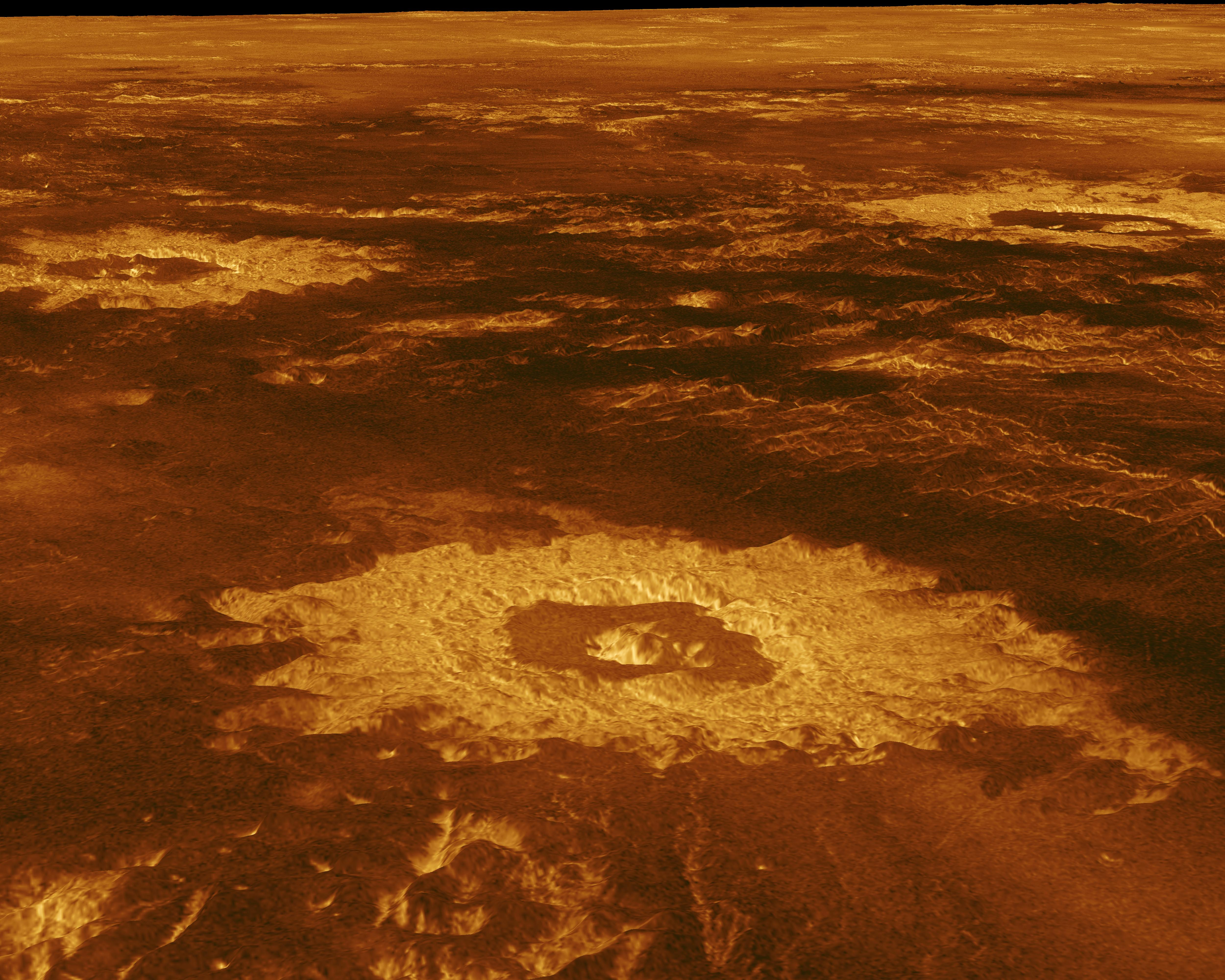
Impact craters on the surface of Venus (image reconstructed from radar data)

If selected for development, VISAGE would have launched in December 2024 with a targeted flyby of Venus in May 2025, and Venus arrival in December 2025. A carrier spacecraft would deploy the lander five days before it flew by Venus. The atmosphere of Venus at the surface has an average temperature of 450 °C and is highly acidic and corrosive, which severely limits the time a lander can function. The VISAGE lander would function autonomously while descending (1 hour) and would operate on the surface for additional 3.5 hours, and it would transmit its acquired data to the nearby carrier module for relay to Earth.

== Science investigations ==
During its parachute descent, the VISAGE lander would analyse atmospheric noble gases and light stable isotopes inventory, as well as reactive and trace gases, and measure the atmospheric structure profile. It would also image the surface starting from an altitude of 15 km (9.3 mi) and acquire panoramic images of the landing site.

The VISAGE lander would drill on the shallow subsurface and samples would be brought on board to measure the mineralogy and elemental composition.

=== Goals ===
The proposed mission goals are:

- to measure noble gases to test models of the origin and evolution of Venus, and measure sulfur compounds and trace gas profiles to constrain atmospheric cycles, surface-atmosphere interactions, and climate models.
- to understand whether Venus was ever like Earth: VISAGE would measure surface and subsurface composition, determine surface rock type, mineralogy, and texture to understand geochemical processes, weathering, and aeolian processes.
- to understand clues about exoplanets.

== Payload ==
The proposed lander payload comprises five instruments: the Atmospheric Structure Investigation including Doppler Wind measurements, a Neutral Mass Spectrometer, an Imaging System, an X-ray Fluorescence experiment, and a Visible Near-Infrared Spectrometer. The total surface science data return is expected to be ~1.4 GBits.

== See also ==
- Venus In situ Composition Investigations (VICI), a competing atmospheric probe and lander
- Venus Origins Explorer (VOX), a competing atmospheric probe and orbiter
