= Venus Origins Explorer =

Concept orbiter mission to Venus

Venus Origins Explorer (VOX) is a concept orbiter mission to Venus.

VOX would produce global, high resolution topography and imaging of Venus's surface and produce the first maps of deformation and global surface composition, thermal emissivity, and gravity field to study the interior structure of the planet. Current data are suggestive of recent and active volcanism on Venus, and this mission could determine if current volcanism is limited to mantle plume heads or if it is more widespread.

The Principal Investigator for VOX is Suzanne Smrekar at the Jet Propulsion Laboratory. Smrekar was the PI of the VERITAS orbiter proposal to Venus that competed in 2015 for the Discovery Program 13 mission. VOX is a reformulation of VERITAS proposed in 2017 to NASA's New Frontiers program mission 4 to compete for funding and development, but it was not selected.

== Overview ==
Although the Announcement of Opportunity called for a Venus lander, the VOX scientific team is proposing an orbiter with a payload capable of achieving the required objectives. The VOX proposing team explains: "At the time of the Decadal Survey the ability to map mineralogy from orbit and present-day radar techniques to detect active [surface] deformation were not fully assessed because their development was still ongoing. VOX leverages these methods and in-situ noble gases to answer [the key] New Frontiers science objectives." The VOX mission concept would have the orbiter deploy a small, simple atmospheric probe, the Atmospheric Sample Vehicle (ASV), to measure the key gases and isotopes. The rest of the measurements would be made from instruments on the orbiter over at least three years.

The mission was last proposed in 2017 to NASA's New Frontiers program mission 4 to compete for funding and development, but it was not selected.

== Objectives ==
The VOX mission objectives are:

- Investigate atmospheric physics and chemistry, including noble gases and their isotopes.
- Investigate Venus's past hydrological cycles to determine the role of volatiles in crustal formation.
- Investigate crustal physics and chemistry and determine the global tectonic framework and heat flow, whether catastrophic resurfacing occurred, and any type of geologic processes that may be currently active.
- Investigate crustal weathering by constraining global mineralogy and surface-atmosphere weathering reactions.
- Map cloud particle modes and their temporal variations, and track cloud level winds in the polar vortices.
- Investigate surface-atmosphere interactions, create mineralogy maps and search for new and/or recent volcanism and outgassed water during a three-year global search.

== Proposed payload ==
The orbiter would carry two scientific instruments and a radio:

- A radar called Venus Interferometric Synthetic Aperture Radar (VISAR) would generate high-resolution imaging of the surface at 15 m to 30 m resolution, and search for minute changes in surface elevations to look for evidence of current volcanic or tectonic activity by performing repeat-passes during 3 years.
- The Venus Emissivity Mapper (VEM) would employ a spectrometer using five near-infrared wavelengths where the atmosphere is transparent to map the chemical composition at the surface, and thus determine whether tesserae regions formed in the presence of water. Measurements in additional bands would study cloud structure and cloud displacement (indicating winds), and would search for water vapor in the lowermost atmosphere.
- The orbiter's radio signal in the Ka-band would provide the gravity field resolution needed to estimate global elastic thickness, and map the gravity field at high resolution to study the interior structure of the planet.

== Atmospheric Sample Vehicle ==
The VOX mission concept would have the orbiter deploy a small atmospheric probe called Atmospheric Sample Vehicle (ASV), previously named Cupid's Arrow. The probe would enter the atmosphere at such speed and angle that it will bounce back into space after collecting an upper atmospheric sample. Once back in space, a miniaturized quadrupole ion trap mass spectrometer would measure the key gases and isotopes.

Measurements of xenon and its isotopes, yet to be made at Venus, would resolve key questions about the origins of the atmosphere and the cumulative volcanic activity. Similarly, a long-lost ocean on Venus would be reflected in the ratio of hydrogen isotopes.

== See also ==
- Venus In Situ Atmospheric and Geochemical Explorer (VISAGE), a competing Venus atmospheric probe and lander.
- Venus In situ Composition Investigations (VICI), a competing Venus atmospheric probe and lander.
