= New Frontiers program =

Series of space exploration missions being conducted by NASA

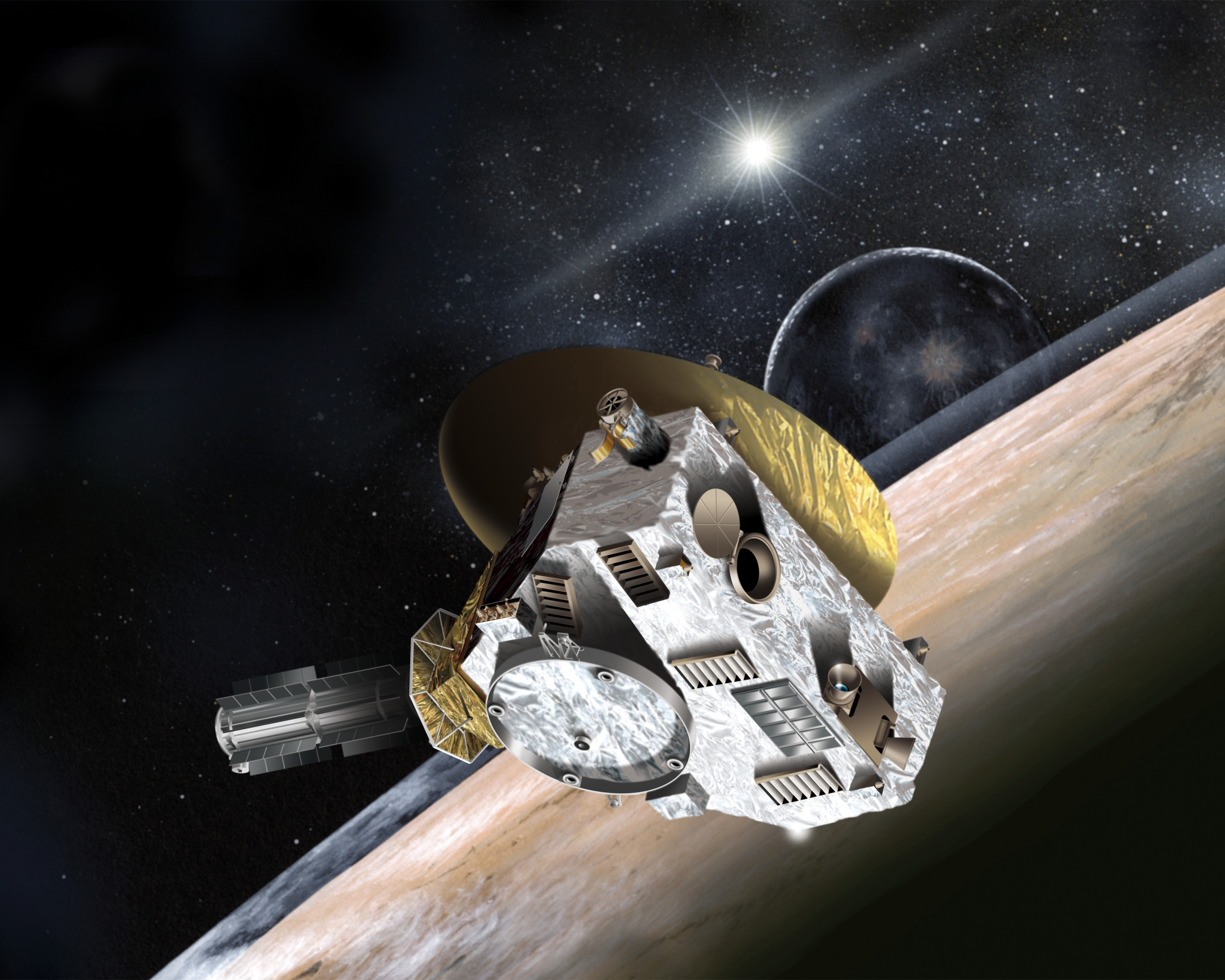

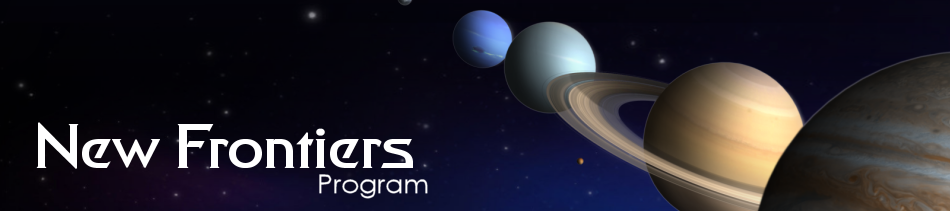
Header of the New Frontiers program website as of January 2016

The New Frontiers program is a series of space exploration missions being conducted by NASA with the purpose of furthering the understanding of the Solar System. The program selects medium-class missions which can provide high science returns.

NASA is encouraging both domestic and international scientists to submit mission proposals for the program. New Frontiers was built on the innovative approach used by the Discovery and Explorer Programs of principal investigator-led missions. It is designed for medium-class missions that cannot be accomplished within the cost and time constraints of Discovery, but are not as large as Large Strategic Science Missions (Flagship missions).

There are currently three New Frontiers missions in progress and one in development. New Horizons, which was launched in 2006 and reached Pluto in 2015, Juno, which was launched in 2011 and entered Jupiter orbit in 2016, and OSIRIS-REx, launched in September 2016 towards asteroid Bennu for detailed studies from 2018 to 2021 and a sample return to Earth in 2023.

On June 27, 2019, Dragonfly was selected to become the fourth mission in the New Frontiers program.

== History ==
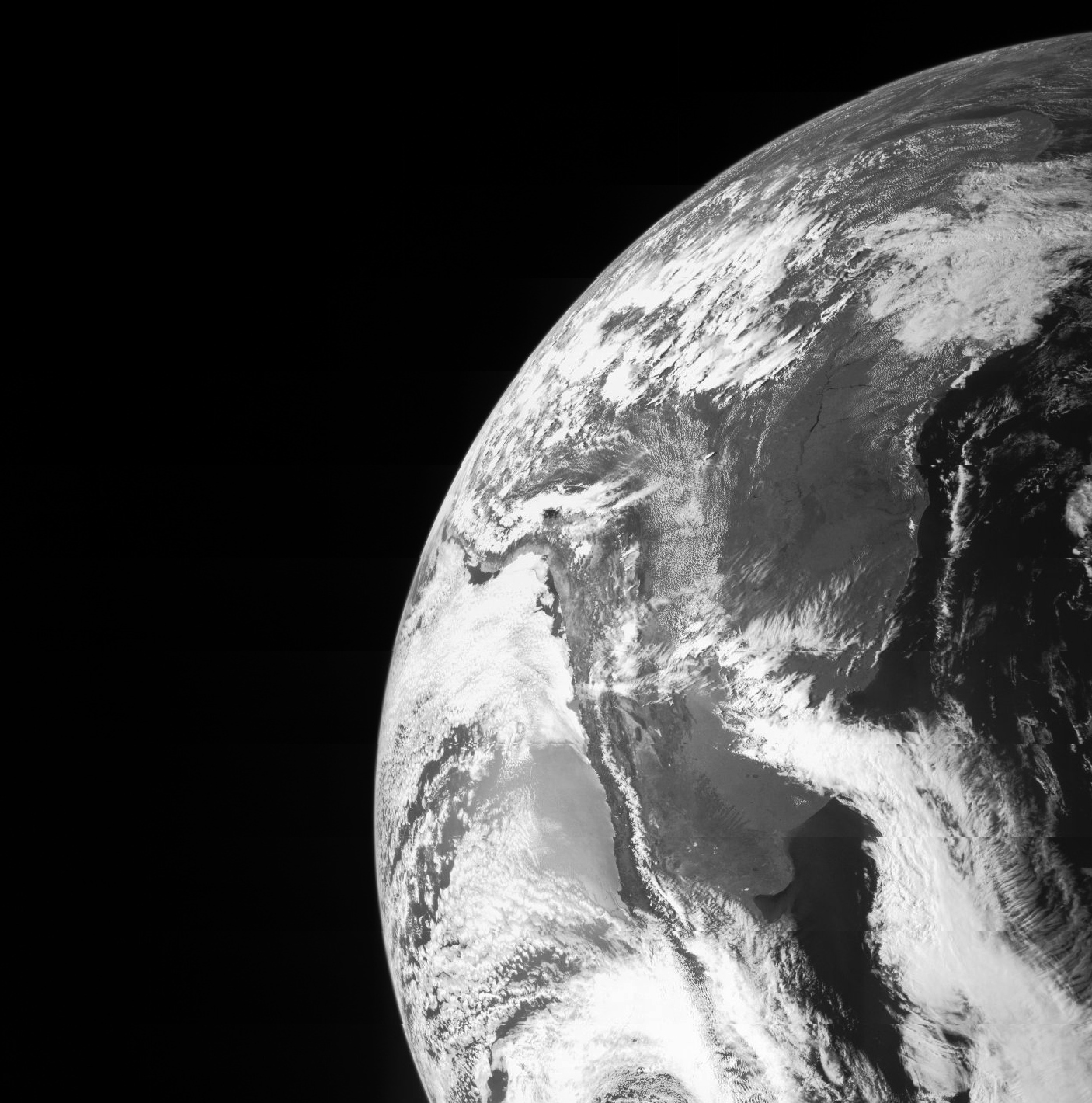
Juno views Earth in October 2013 during the spacecraft's flyby en route to Jupiter.

The New Frontiers program was developed and advocated by NASA and granted by Congress in CY 2002 and 2003. This effort was led by two long-time NASA executives at headquarters at that time: Edward Weiler, Associate Administrator of Science, and Colleen Hartman, Solar System Exploration Division Director. The mission to Pluto had already been selected before this program was successfully endorsed and funded, so the mission to Pluto, called New Horizons, was "grandfathered" into the New Frontiers program.

The 2003 Planetary Science Decadal Survey from the National Academy of Sciences identified destinations that then served as the source of the first competition for the New Frontiers program. The NASA program name is based on President John F. Kennedy's "New Frontier" political agenda speech in 1960, in which he constantly used the words "New Frontier" to describe a variety of social issues and noted how pioneer exploration did not end with the American West as once thought. As President, Kennedy would also invest heavily in funding for NASA.

Examples of proposed mission concepts include three broad groups based on Planetary Science Decadal Survey goals.

- From New Frontiers in the Solar System: An Integrated Exploration Strategy
  - Kuiper Belt Pluto Explorer (realized in New Horizons)
  - Jupiter Polar Orbiter with Probes (led to Juno)
  - Venus In Situ Explorer
  - Lunar South Pole-Aitken Basin Sample Return Mission
  - Comet Surface Sample Return Mission: Comet Astrobiology Exploration Sample Return (CAESAR) (see also the similar OSIRIS-REx, which targeted a near-Earth object, not a comet.)
- From Vision and Voyages for Planetary Science in the Decade 2013–2022
  - Io Volcano Observer
  - Lunar Geophysical Network
  - Saturn Atmospheric Entry Probe
  - Trojan Tour and Rendezvous
- From Origins, Worlds, and Life: A Decadal Strategy for Planetary Science and Astrobiology 2023–2032
  - Centaur Orbiter and Lander
  - Ceres Sample Return
  - Enceladus Multiple Flyby
  - Titan Orbiter

== Missions in progress ==
=== New Horizons (New Frontiers 1) ===
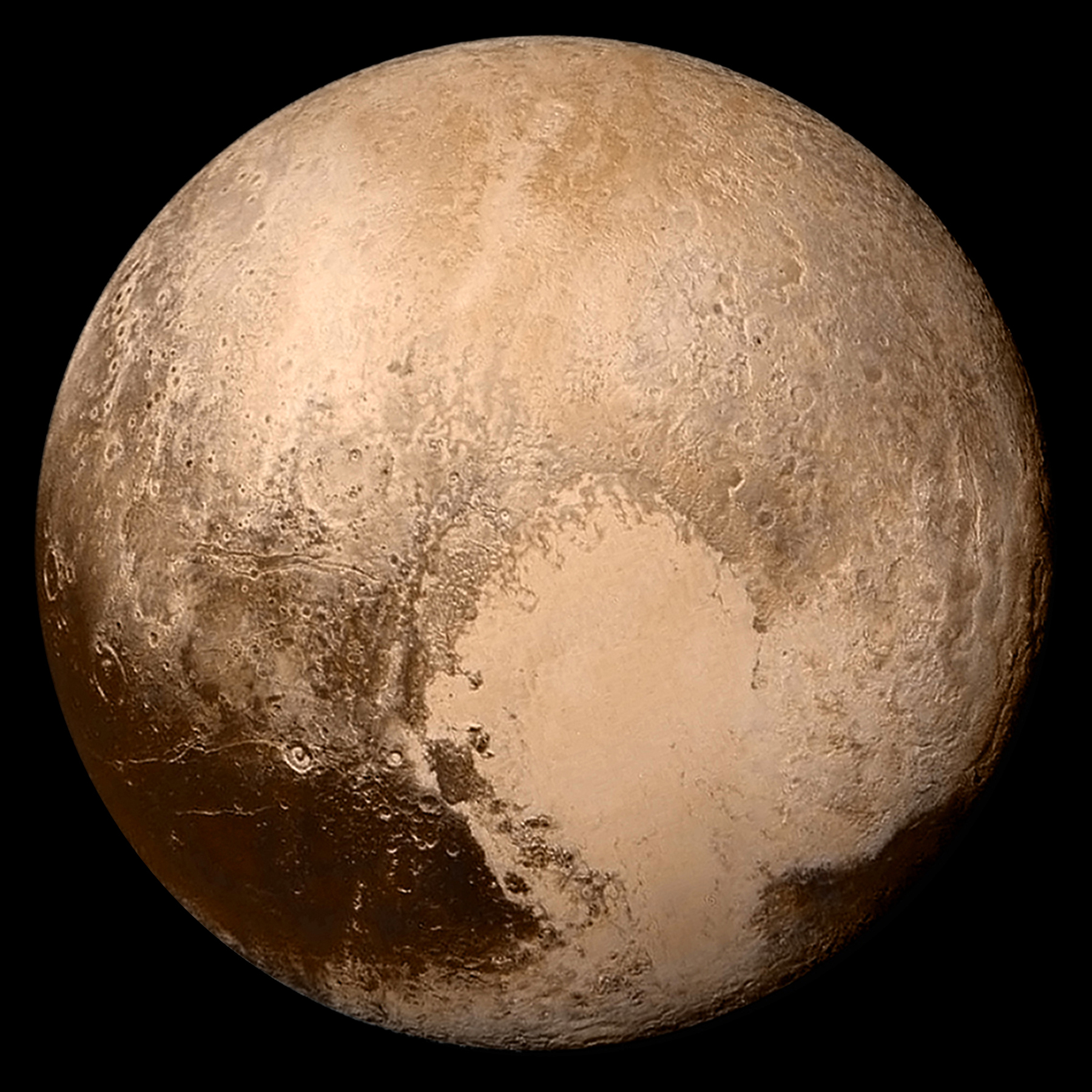
Pluto viewed by the spacecraft New Horizons on July 14, 2015

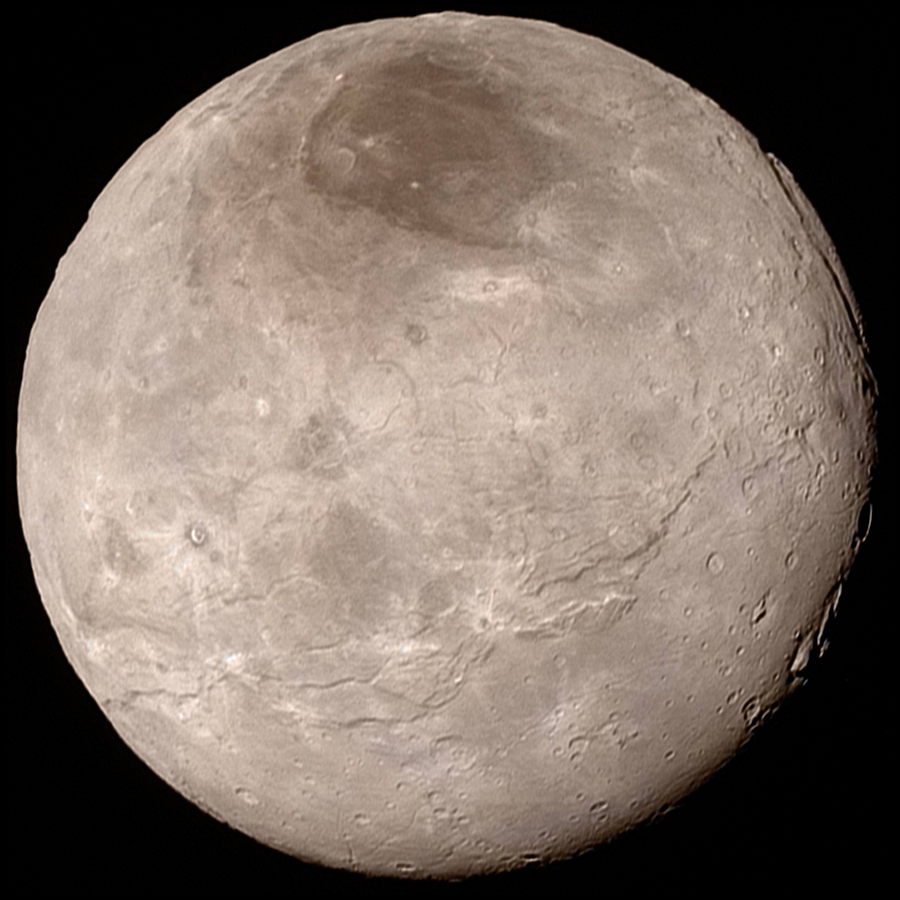
Pluto's moon Charon on July 14, 2015, imaged by "New Horizons"

New Horizons, a mission to Pluto, was launched on January 19, 2006. After a Jupiter gravity assist in February 2007 the spacecraft continued towards Pluto. The primary mission flyby occurred on July 14, 2015, and the spacecraft was then targeted toward one Kuiper Belt object called 486958 Arrokoth for a January 1, 2019 flyby. Another mission that was considered with this mission was New Horizons 2.

=== Juno (New Frontiers 2) ===
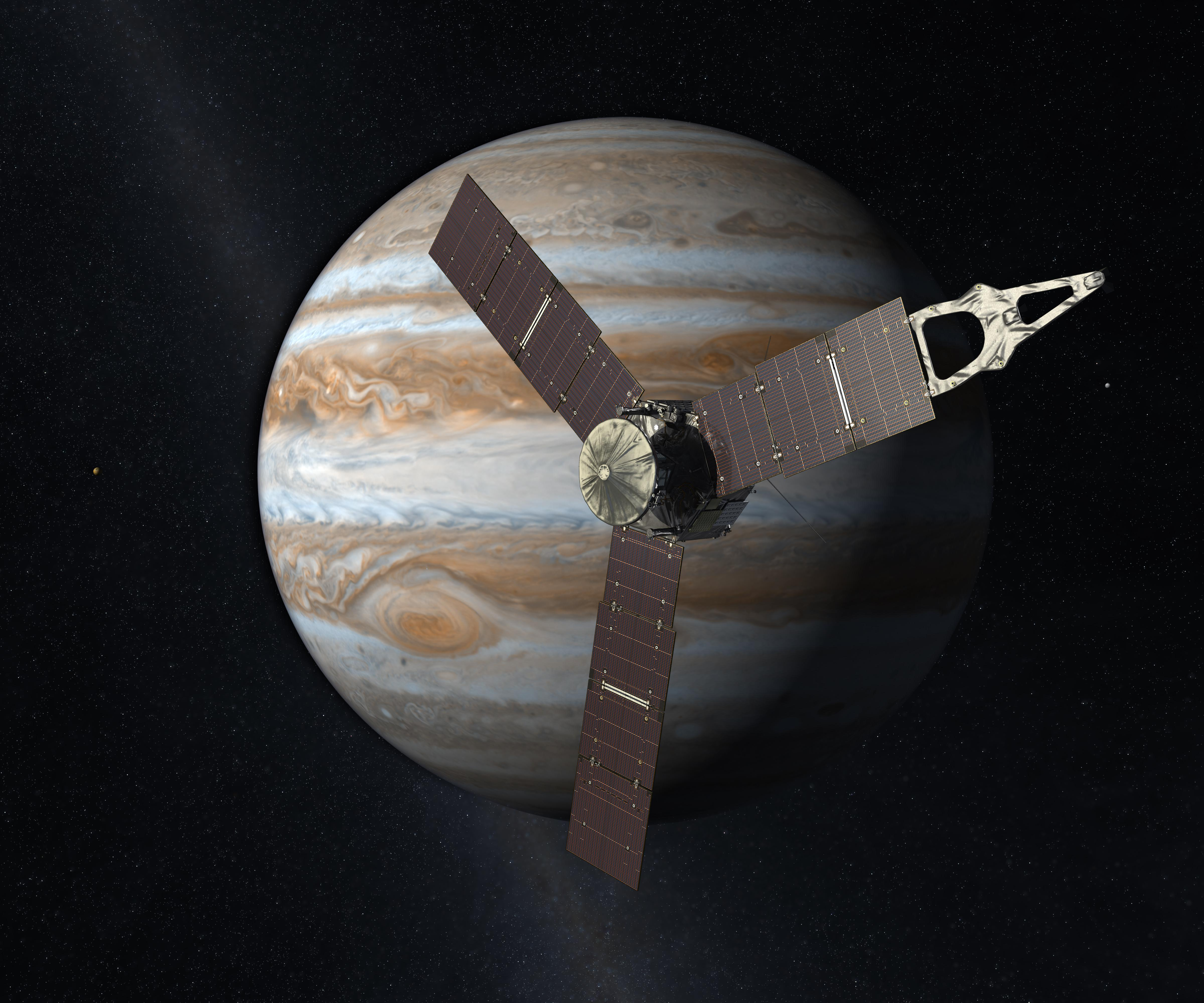
Artists's concept of Juno at Jupiter

Juno is a Jupiter exploration mission which launched on August 5, 2011, and arrived in July 2016. It is the first solar-powered spacecraft to explore an outer planet. The craft was placed into a polar orbit in order to study the planet's magnetic field and internal structure. NASA's Galileo mission to Jupiter provided extensive knowledge about its upper atmosphere, however, further study of Jupiter is crucial not only to the understanding of its origin and nature of the Solar System, but also of giant extrasolar planets in general. The Juno spacecraft investigation is intended to address the following objectives for Jupiter:

- Understand Jupiter's gross dynamical and structural properties through determination of the mass and size of Jupiter's core, its gravitational and magnetic fields, and internal convection;
- Measure the Jovian atmospheric composition, particularly the condensable-gas abundances (H_{2}O, NH_{3}, CH_{4} and H_{2}S), the Jovian atmospheric temperature profile, wind velocity profile, and cloud opacity to greater depths than achieved by the Galileo entry probe with a goal of 100 bar at multiple latitudes; and
- Investigate and characterize the three-dimensional structure of Jupiter's polar magnetosphere.

=== OSIRIS-REx (New Frontiers 3) ===
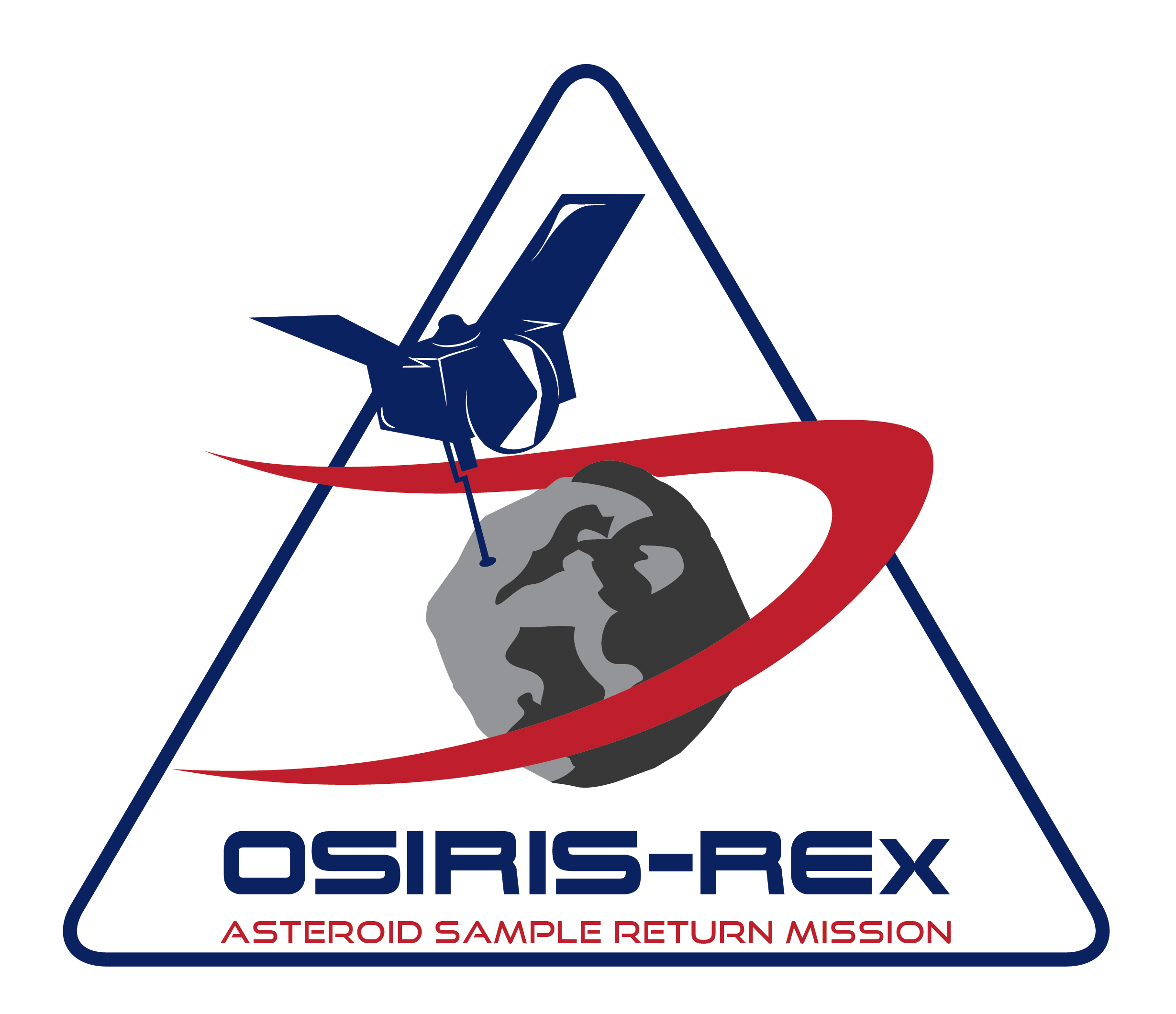
Mission logo

OSIRIS-REx stands for "Origins, Spectral Interpretation, Resource Identification, Security, Regolith Explorer", and was launched on 8 September 2016. This mission plan was to orbit an asteroid, at the time named 1999 RQ_{36} (now 101955 Bennu), by 2020. After extensive measurements, the spacecraft collected a sample from the asteroid's surface for return to Earth in 2023. The mission, minus the cost of the launch vehicle ($183.5 million), is expected to cost approximately $800 million. The returned sample will help scientists answer long-held questions about the formation of the Solar System and the origin of complex organic molecules necessary for the origin of life.

Asteroid Bennu is a potential future Earth impactor and is listed on the Sentry Risk Table with the third highest rating on the Palermo Technical Impact Hazard Scale (circa 2015). In the late 2100s there is a cumulative chance of about 0.07% it could strike Earth, therefore there is a need to measure the composition and Yarkovsky effect of the asteroid.

== Planned missions ==
=== Dragonfly (New Frontiers 4) ===
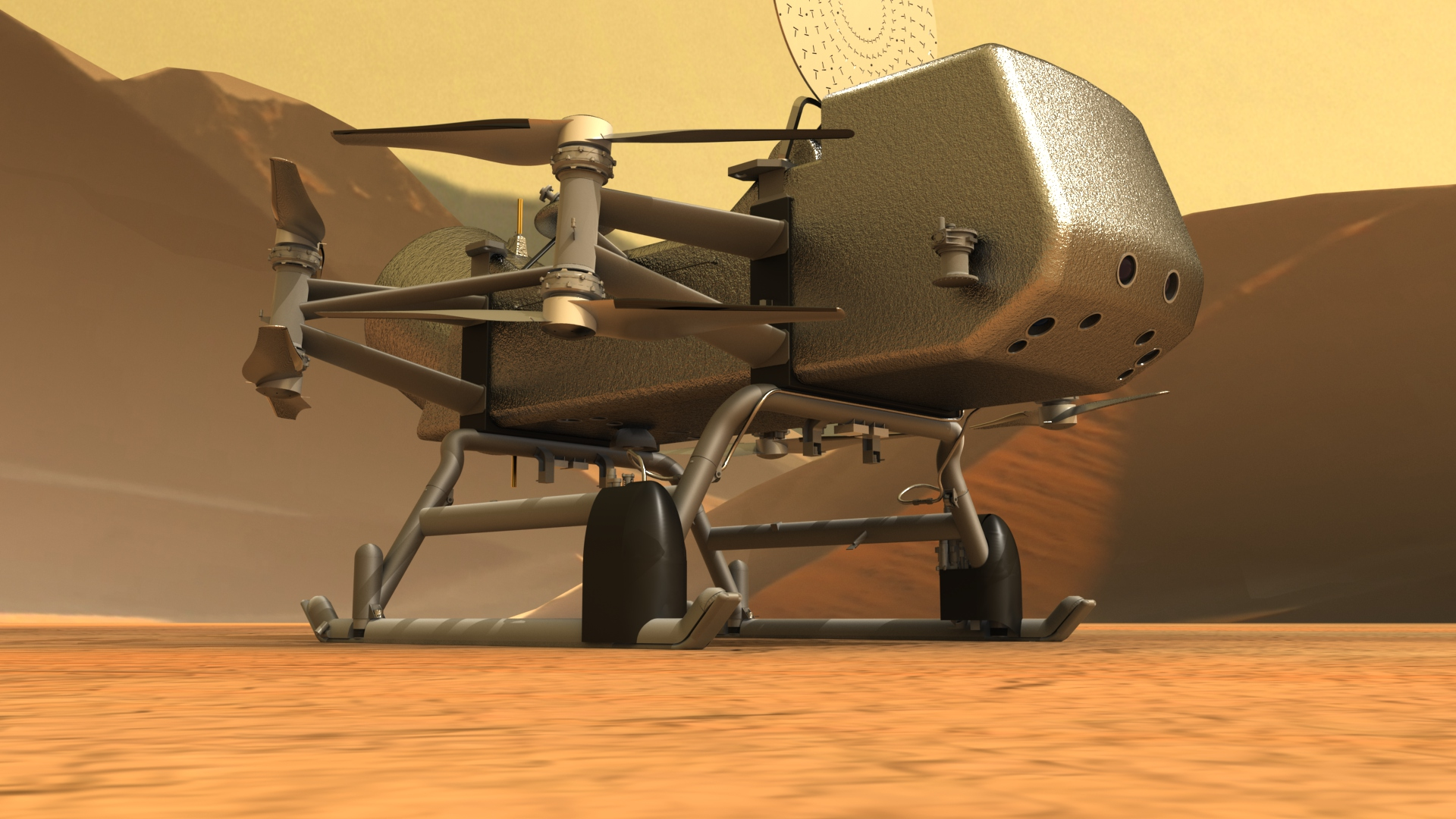
Artist's concept of Dragonfly on Titan

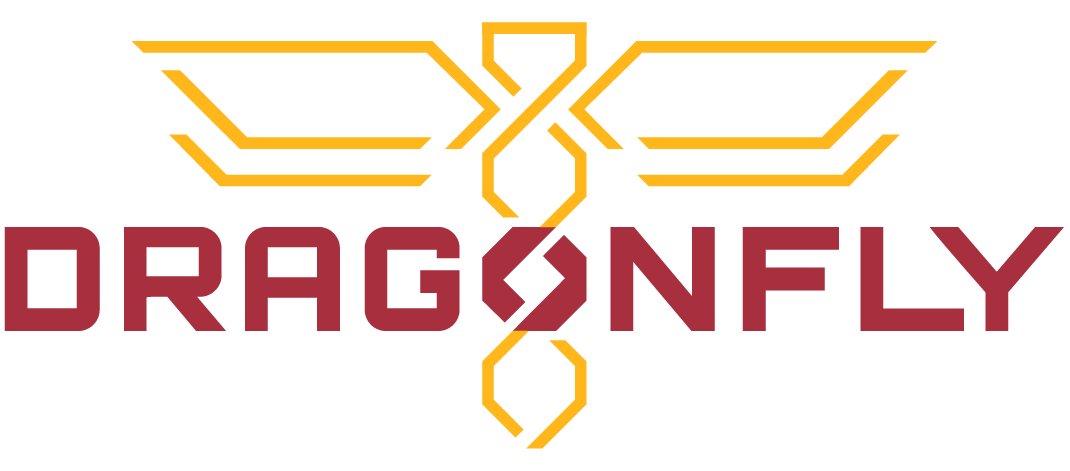
Dragonfly Mission Insignia

Dragonfly will send a mobile robotic rotorcraft to Saturn's biggest moon Titan and will make use of Multi-Mission Radioisotope Thermoelectric Generators (MMRTG) for power to navigate through the atmosphere of Titan. The development cost cap is approximately $1 billion. As of June 2024, Dragonfly is scheduled for launch in July 2028.

The competition for the fourth mission began in January 2017. NASA's announcement of opportunity was limited to six mission themes: five recommended by the 2011 Decadal Survey, and a sixth, "Ocean Worlds" that encompassed either Titan or Enceladus related missions that had not been included in the survey's recommendations:

1. Comet Surface Sample Return – a comet nucleus lander and sample return mission
2. Lunar South Pole Sample Return – a mission to land at the Moon's South Pole–Aitken basin and return samples to Earth
3. Ocean Worlds (Titan and/or Enceladus)
4. Saturn Probe – an atmospheric probe
5. Trojan Tour and Rendezvous – a mission to fly by two or more Trojan asteroids
6. Venus Lander

NASA received and reviewed 12 proposals:

Comet Surface Sample Return

- Comet Nucleus Dust and Organics Return (CONDOR), to retrieve a sample from 67P/Churyumov–Gerasimenko.
- Comet Rendezvous, Sample Acquisition, Investigation, and Return (CORSAIR) would sample comet 88P/Howell.
- Comet Astrobiology Exploration Sample Return (CAESAR) to comet 67P/Churyumov–Gerasimenko

Lunar South Pole Sample Return

- MoonRise, a sample return mission to explore the lunar South Pole–Aitken basin

Ocean Worlds

- Oceanus, an orbiter to investigate Titan's potential habitability.
- Dragonfly, a rotorcraft that would fly over the landscape and oceans of Titan to study prebiotic chemistry.
- Enceladus Life Finder (ELF), an astrobiology orbiter to Enceladus.
- Enceladus Life Signatures and Habitability (ELSAH)

Saturn Probe

- Saturn PRobe Interior and aTmosphere Explorer (SPRITE), an atmospheric probe to investigate Saturn's atmosphere and composition.

Trojan Tour and Rendezvous

- None (Note: The Lucy spacecraft will perform a similar mission. It was selected as part of the Discovery Program in January 2017, shortly before the New Frontiers 4 call for proposals.)

Venus Lander

- Venus In Situ Atmospheric and Geochemical Explorer (VISAGE), a Venus atmospheric probe and lander.
- Venus In situ Composition Investigations (VICI), a lander.
- Venus Origins Explorer (VOX), a Venus orbiter.

Out of 12 initial proposals, NASA selected two for additional concept studies on 20 December 2017, including Dragonfly.

The two finalists, CAESAR and Dragonfly, each received $4 million funding through the end of 2018 to further develop and mature their concepts. On June 27, 2019, NASA announced the selection of Dragonfly as the New Frontiers 4 mission for a launch in 2026, later delayed to July 2028.

=== New Frontiers 5 ===
In 2011, the Planetary Science Decadal Survey Visions and Voyages for Planetary Science in the Decade 2013 – 2022, recommended that two New Frontiers missions be selected per decade, with the 2013-2022 period to contain the selection of New Frontiers 4 and 5. The 2011 Survey recommended that for New Frontiers 5, any candidate mission themes remaining from its list for New Frontiers 4 carry forward, and two further candidate themes be added, Io Observer and Lunar Geophysical Network. With the addition of the Ocean Worlds theme following the 2011 survey and the selection of Dragonfly as NF-4 in 2019, this left the list of eligible themes for NF-5 as:

- Comet Surface Sample Return
- Io Observer
- Lunar Geophysical Network
- Lunar South Pole-Aitken Basin Sample Return
- Ocean Worlds (only Enceladus);
- Saturn Probe; and
- Venus In-Situ Explorer

The 2018 Midterm Review of the 2013–2022 Decadal Survey found that NASA was falling behind on the two-mission-per-decade cadence, and recommended the release of the New Frontiers 5 Announcement of Opportunity no later than December 2021. Thomas Zurbuchen, Associate Administrator for the Science Mission Directorate, responded positively to the Midterm Review's recommendation, stating that NASA was "committed to conducting two New Frontiers competitions per decade" and planned to release the Announcement of Opportunity in 2021 or 2022, though the Midterm Review estimated a release date as late as 2023.

The successor planetary science Decadal Survey, Origins, Worlds, and Life: A Decadal Strategy for Planetary Science and Astrobiology 2023-2032 was released in April 2022. It recommended mission themes for New Frontiers 6 and New Frontiers 7, under the premise that New Frontiers 5 would be selected shortly thereafter based on the 2011 Decadal Survey's candidate list. The report noted the decadal survey process had begun when it was assumed New Frontiers 5 would be selected in 2021, and the "committee membership was not designed nor vetted to provide impartial findings and recommendations on NF-5."

NASA released the draft of the Announcement of Opportunity New Frontiers 5 on January 10, 2023. On August 24, 2023, NASA announced that due to budgetary constraints enacted through the Fiscal Responsibility Act of 2023, the official release of the Announcement of Opportunity for New Frontiers 5 would be delayed to no earlier than 2026.

The further delay in New Frontiers 5 selection caused the New Frontiers 5 timeframe to now overlap with the timeframe previously expected for New Frontiers 6, and raised questions about whether the recommendations of the 2011 or 2022 Decadal Surveys ought to drive the mission selection priorities. NASA requested that the National Academies of Sciences, Engineering, and Medicine investigate and report on any scientific, programmatic, and technological advances that have a significant impact on the mission themes prioritized for the New Frontiers 5 selection. On February 25, 2025 a Consensus Study Report was released recommending a revised list of eligible mission themes for New Frontiers 5 that proposed removing two themes from the original list (Lunar South Pole-Aitken Basin Sample Return, citing overlapping objectives with the Endurance-A mission; and Venus In-Situ Explorer, citing programmatic balance given the DAVINCI, VERITAS and EnVision missions) and pulling forward two themes from the New Frontiers 6 list (Centaur Orbiter and Lander and Ceres Sample Return), leaving the following recommended eligible themes for New Frontiers 5:

- Centaur Orbiter and Lander
- Ceres Sample Return
- Comet Surface Sample Return
- Enceladus Multiple Flyby
- Io Observer
- Lunar Geophysical Network; and
- Saturn Probe

=== New Frontiers 6 and 7 ===
New Frontiers 6 is expected to continue to use the 2022 Decadal Survey theme list. Relative to the recommended revised New Frontiers 5 theme list, this would add two further missions themes not endorsed for earlier launch due to relatively contemporaneous missions to Titan and Venus and exclude what may be selected for New Frontiers 5:

- Centaur Orbiter and Lander
- Ceres Sample Return
- Comet Surface Sample Return
- Enceladus Multiple Flyby
- Lunar Geophysical Network;
- Saturn Probe;
- Titan Orbiter; and
- Venus In-Situ Explorer

New Frontiers 7 is also anticipated to continue to use the 2022 Decadal Survey theme list, consisting of any of the New Frontiers 6 candidate themes not selected in New Frontiers 5 or 6, with the addition of a "Triton Ocean Worlds Surveyor" mission theme. However, given NASA's reduced cadence it is possible that another Decadal Survey will have been completed by the time the mission selection process begins.

== See also ==
- Cosmic Vision, ESA program that has several mission classes
