= Planetary Missions Program Office =

Division of NASA

Coordinates: 34.661500°N 86.668995°W

The Planetary Missions Program Office is a division of NASA headquartered at the Marshall Space Flight Center, formed by the agency's Science Mission Directorate (SMD). Succeeding the Discovery and New Frontiers Program Office, it was established in 2014 to manage the Discovery and New Frontiers programs of low and medium-cost missions by third-party institutions, and the Solar System Exploration Program of NASA-led missions that focus on prioritized planetary science objectives. The Discovery and New Frontiers programs were established in 1992 and 2001 respectively, and have launched fourteen primary missions together, along with two missions launched under the administration of the Planetary Missions Program Office. The Solar System Exploration Program was established alongside the office, with three missions planned for launch under the new program.

== History ==
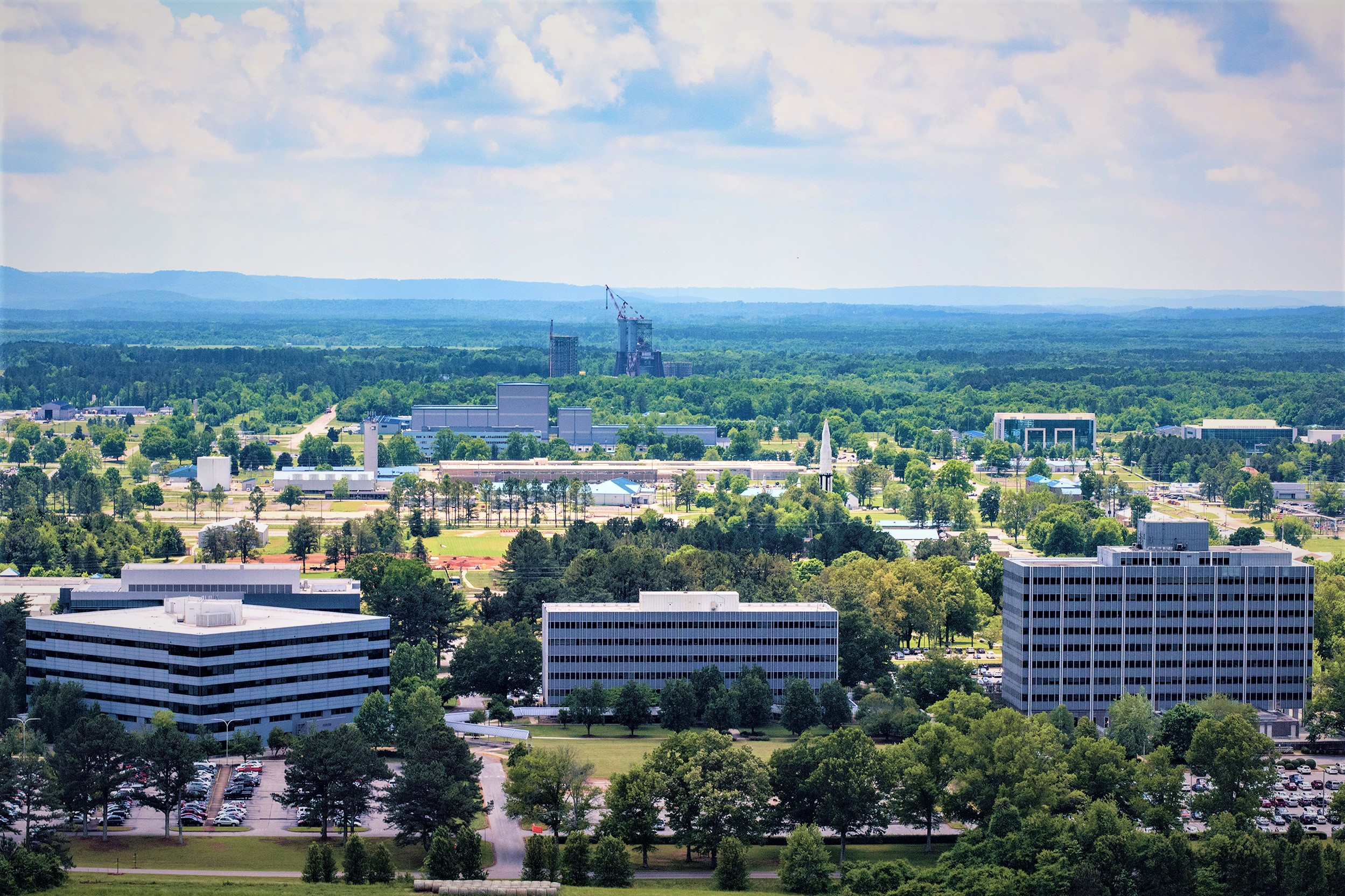
The Marshall Space Flight Center in Huntsville, Alabama, where the Planetary Missions Program Office is located

The Planetary Missions Program Office was established in late 2014 as part of a series of changes implemented by NASA after the passage of the Commerce, Justice, Science, and Related Agencies Appropriations Act, 2015, which allocated US$1.438 billion to planetary missions, and the Obama administration's request for the 2016 United States federal budget. The program office is a replacement for the Discovery and New Frontiers Program Office, established in 2004, and occupies their former headquarters at the Marshall Space Flight Center in Huntsville, Alabama. The Planetary Missions Program Office took control of the Discovery and New Frontiers program, along with the Europa Mission and NASA contributions to the European Space Agency (ESA)'s JUICE mission, in a then-unnamed program outside of Discovery and New Frontiers. In 2017, the program was named the "Solar System Exploration Program", and grew to include NASA's surviving DART component of the cancelled AIDA mission, after ESA terminated their contribution to the mission in late 2016.

== Programs ==
=== Discovery Program ===
The Discovery program was established in late 1990 as a program of low-cost, limited-scope Solar System exploration missions, succeeding the objectives of the Planetary Observer program. In the late 1980s, leaders at NASA opted towards expensive, more ambitious missions to advance their objectives. This included the Space Exploration Initiative by the George H. W. Bush administration, which laid out a plan to construct Space Station Freedom and establish a human exploration program to the Moon and Mars. Consistent cost overruns and lack of support from the United States Congress, however, created a trend towards smaller, less ambitious missions. NASA's Solar System Exploration Division (SSED) initially proposed to model a new program of small-class unmanned missions after the Planetary Observer program, though members were skeptical, due to the budget problems plaguing the Planetary Observer program at the time. It was decided instead to base it on the Explorer program, following advice from Explorer administrative staffer Tom Krimigis. Under this model, the program gained support from then-NASA Administrator Daniel S. Goldin, and the program was formally approved by Congress in 1992.

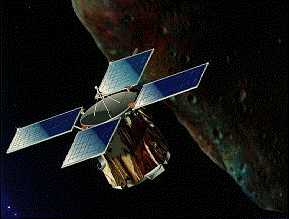
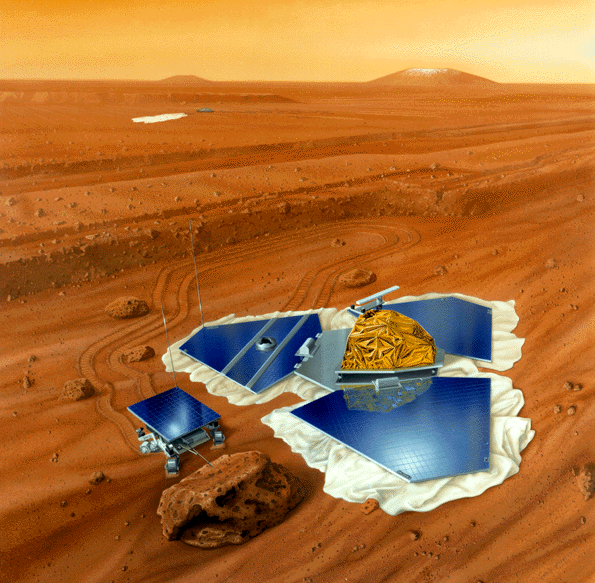
NEAR Shoemaker (left) and Mars Pathfinder (right), the founding missions of the Discovery program, exemplifying its roster of low-cost, specialized missions

Originally a Planetary Observer program mission, NEAR Shoemaker was reassigned to the Discovery program, after the Jet Propulsion Laboratory and the Applied Physics Laboratory found that the mission was possible to execute on a budget smaller than originally planned. Its final mission cost would reach US$224 million. Mars Pathfinder was also reassigned to the program as part of cuts to the Space Exploration Initiative Mars Environmental Survey (MESUR) program, following the loss of its flagship Mars Observer. Both NEAR Shoemaker and Mars Pathfinder were successfully launched in February and December 1996 respectively; the former achieved orbit around the asteroid 433 Eros in February 2000, and the latter landed on Mars and delivered the first operational Mars rover, Sojourner, to the surface of the planet in July 1997. After NEAR Shoemaker and Mars Pathfinder, the Discovery program began selecting its future missions from proposals from third-party institutions, in competitions named "Announcements of Opportunity" (AOs). Twelve missions have been selected through AOs, with the latest, reconnaissance missions Lucy and Psyche, selected in January 2017 after a three-year long competition. The Discovery program also presides over "Missions of Opportunity" (MOs) to develop instruments for non-NASA missions, such as the ASPERA-3 instrument onboard ESA's Mars Express and the M^{3} instrument aboard ISRO's Chandrayaan-1. MOs were originally selected in competitions alongside AOs, though have been selected in "Stand Alone Mission of Opportunity Notices" (SALMONs) since 2009. SALMON-3 is currently underway to select NASA's contribution to JAXA's Martian Moons Exploration mission.

Missions

- NEAR Shoemaker – launched 1996, completed – flyby and orbital reconnaissance of 253 Mathilde and 433 Eros.
- Mars Pathfinder – launched 1996, completed – EDL and rover technology demonstration on Mars.
- Lunar Prospector – launched 1998, completed – surface composition, gravity, and magnetic field study of the Moon.
- Stardust – launched 1999, completed – sample return from the coma of Wild 2.
- Genesis – launched 2001, completed – sample return collecting solar wind particles. Sample return capsule crashed on impact.
- CONTOUR – launched 2002, failed – flyby reconnaissance of three comets; failed on launch.
- MESSENGER – launched 2004, completed – orbital reconnaissance of Mercury.
- Deep Impact – launched 2005, completed – impact-flyby reconnaissance of Tempel 1.
- Dawn – launched 2005, completed – orbital reconnaissance of 4 Vesta and 1 Ceres.
- Kepler space telescope – launched 2009, completed – discovery and observation of new exoplanets.
- GRAIL – launched 2011, completed – gravitational field study of the Moon.
- InSight – launched 2018, completed – seismology and geology study of planet Mars.
- Lucy – launched 2021, operational – flyby reconnaissance of one main belt asteroid and six Jupiter trojans, including a binary system.
- Psyche – launched 2023, operational – orbital reconnaissance of 16 Psyche launched October 13, 2023.
- DAVINCI – launching 2029, future – Venus atmospheric probe.
- VERITAS – launching 2031, future – orbital reconnaissance of Venus.

=== New Frontiers program ===
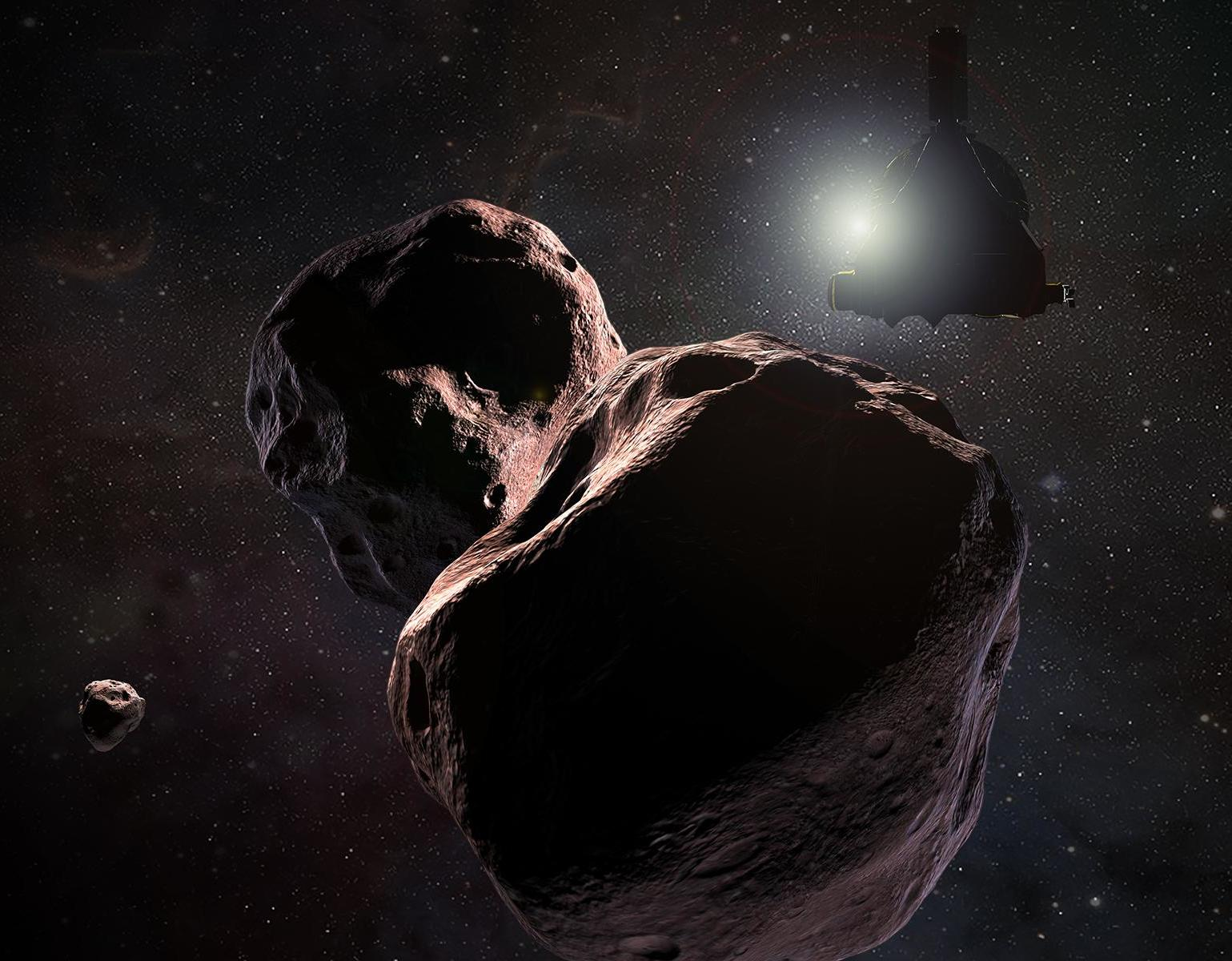
New Horizons survived the cancellation of the Outer Planet/Solar Probe program to become the founding mission of the New Frontiers program

The New Frontiers program is the successor to the cancelled Outer Planet/Solar Probe (OPSP) program, a project which aimed to launch the Europa Orbiter astrobiology mission, the Pluto Kuiper Express reconnaissance mission, and the Solar Orbiter heliophysics mission. To reduce the growing costs of the OPSP, the Pluto Kuiper Express was cancelled in 2000 by then-Science Mission Directorate Edward J. Weiler, who subsequently accepted proposals for a replacement mission and modelled the competition after the Discovery program's AOs. The New Horizons mission was chosen to replace Pluto Kuiper Express in the OPSP program in November 2001, though the entire program, including the Europa Orbiter, New Horizons, and Solar Probe, was cancelled by Administrator of NASA Sean O'Keefe in February 2002, shortly after his appointment by President George W. Bush. O'Keefe cited a need for a restructuring of NASA and its projects, falling in line with the Bush Administration's wish for NASA to refocus on "research and development, and addressing management shortcomings."

The New Horizons team successfully lobbied for the funding and development of their mission, appearing at the top of the National Research Council's Planetary Science Decadal Survey for 2003–2013. Weiler and then-Solar System Exploration Division Director Colleen Hartman established the New Frontiers program in 2003 to help fund and launch New Horizons and future proposals from the Decadal Survey. New Horizons was launched as the program's first mission on January 20, 2006, and successfully performed the first reconnaissance of Pluto and its moons in July 2015. An extended mission is underway to observe Kuiper Belt Objects (KBOs), including a flyby of 486958 Arrokoth in January 2019. In the first New Frontiers AO, Juno, a mission to investigate the interior of Jupiter, was selected over the MoonRise lunar sample return mission. Juno launched on August 5, 2011, and arrived at Jupiter in July 2016. In May 2011, the OSIRIS-REx asteroid sample return mission was selected over MoonRise and SAGE for the program's third mission. OSIRIS-REx launched on September 8, 2016, and will arrive at the Near-Earth object (NEO) 101955 Bennu in August 2018. The program's fourth mission is Dragonfly, which will launch in 2028 and arrive on Titan in the mid-2030s.

Missions

- New Horizons, launched 2006, operational – flyby reconnaissance of Pluto and Kuiper belt objects.
- Juno, launched 2011, operational – interior and magnetosphere study of Jupiter.
- OSIRIS-REx, launched 2016, operational – orbital reconnaissance and sample return from 101955 Bennu.
- Dragonfly, launching in 2028, future – exploration of the surface of Titan.

=== Solar System Exploration program ===
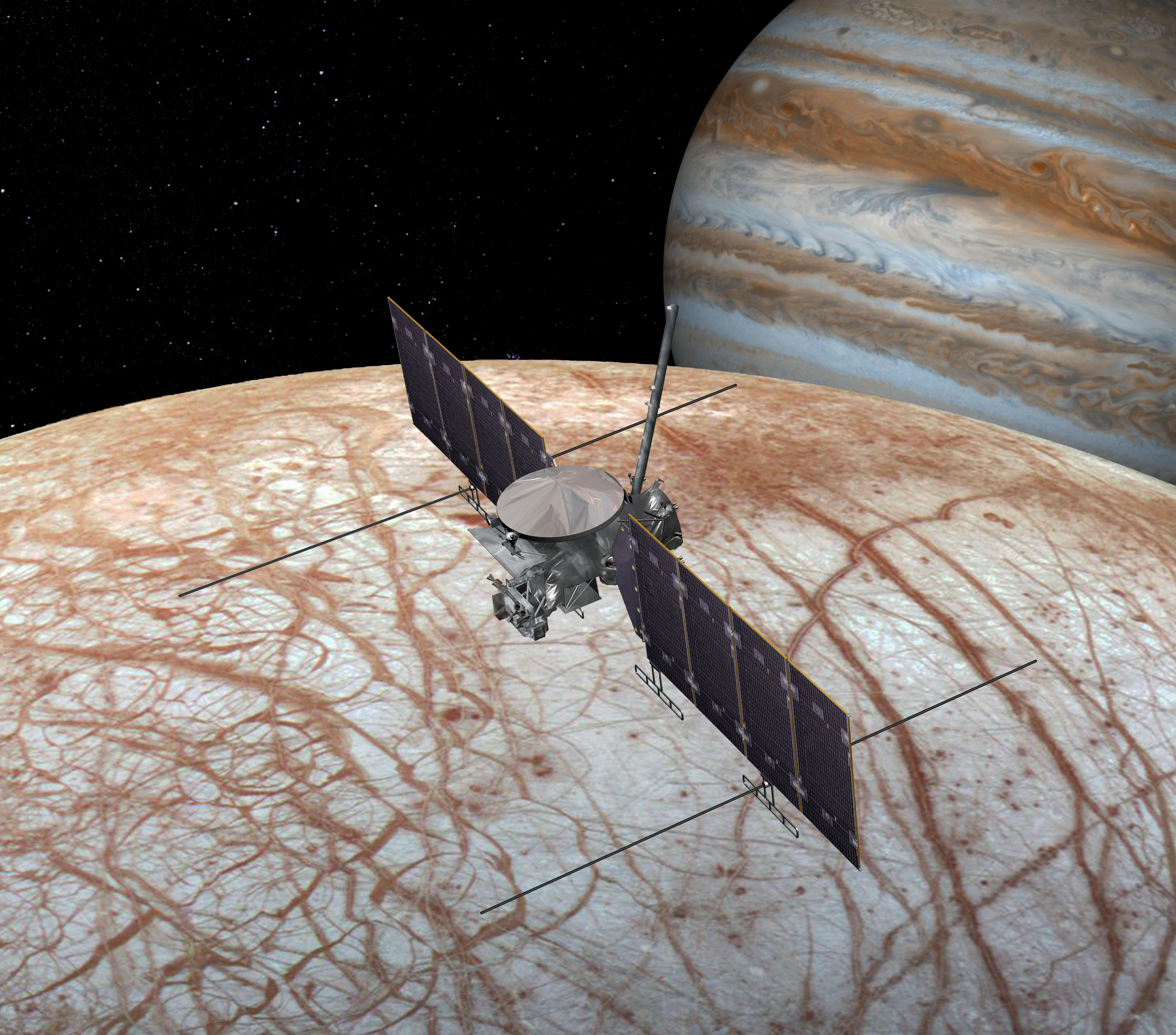
Europa Clipper, one of the first missions of the Solar System Exploration program

In late 2014, the Solar System Exploration program was established alongside the Planetary Missions Program Office to "execute prioritized planetary science." The first mission of the program is DART, an asteroid deflection test targeting 65803 Didymos that launched in 2021. Originally a component of AIDA, DART's impact was intended to be observed by ESA's AIM orbiter, which would continue to study Didymos from orbit. However, the ESA Council at ministerial level cancelled the AIM mission in favour of funding for the ExoMars 2020 rover, citing budget concerns. Despite the cancellation of AIM, NASA committed to their original plan, opting to continue solely with DART. DART successfully impacted Dimorphos, the moon of asteroid 65803 Didymos, on September 26, 2022. Two Europa astrobiology missions are scheduled in the Solar System Exploration program. The Europa Clipper was launched on October 14, 2024, on a SpaceX Falcon Heavy. The ESA JUICE mission to study Europa, Ganymede, and Callisto will use the NASA-built, Solar System Exploration Program-funded Ultraviolet Spectrograph (UVS) and parts of the Particle Environment Package (PEP) and Radar for Icy Moons Exploration (RIME) instruments.

Missions

- DART, launched 2021, completed – impact technology demonstration on 65803 Didymos's satellite.
- JUICE, launched 2023, Operational – astrobiology study of Europa, Ganymede, and Callisto.
- Europa Clipper, launched 2024, Operational – subsurface ocean and habitability study of Europa.

== See also ==
- European Space Agency Science Programme
- Explorers Program
- Large strategic science missions
- Mars Exploration Program
- Ocean Worlds Exploration Program
