= Science Mission Directorate =

NASA body supervising its scientific missions

The Science Mission Directorate (SMD) of the National Aeronautics and Space Administration (NASA) is one of the six directorates that constitute NASA. It operates across several key NASA Centers, with significant leadership and management at NASA Headquarters in Washington, D.C., coordinating activities at centers like Goddard Space Flight Center in Maryland, the Jet Propulsion Laboratory in Pasadena, Langley Research Center in Hampton, Virginia, and Ames Research Center at Moffett Field in California, guiding research in Earth Science, Heliophysics, Planetary Science, and Astrophysics.

== Objectives ==
Its responsibility is to define and direct research into scientific questions of interest, sharing data acquired by NASA missions with the broader scientific community, sponsoring scientific research, and developing satellites and spacecraft in conjunction with other directorates and with partner organizations for scientific missions. The Science Mission Directorate also sponsors research that both enables, and is enabled by, NASA's exploration activities. The SMD portfolio is contributing to NASA's achievement of the Vision for Space Exploration by striving to:

- Understand the history of Mars and the formation of the Solar System. By understanding the formation of diverse terrestrial planets (with atmospheres) in the Solar System, researchers learn more about Earth's future and the most promising opportunities for habitation beyond our planet. For example, differences in the impacts of collisional processes on Earth, the Moon, and Mars can provide clues about differences in origin and evolution of each of these bodies.
- Search for Earth-like planets and habitable environments around other stars. SMD pursues multiple research strategies with the goal of developing effective astronomically-detectable signatures of biological processes. The study of the Earth-Sun system may help researchers identify atmospheric biosignatures that distinguish Earth-like (and potentially habitable) planets around nearby stars. An understanding of the origin of life and the time evolution of the atmosphere on Earth may reveal likely signatures of life on extrasolar planets.
- Explore the Solar System for scientific purposes while supporting safe robotic and human exploration of space. For example, large-scale coronal mass ejections from the Sun can cause potentially lethal consequences for improperly shielded human flight systems, as well as some types of robotic systems. SMD's pursuit of interdisciplinary scientific research focus areas will help predict potentially harmful conditions in space and protect NASA's robotic and human explorers.

== Leadership ==
Nicola Fox is the Associate Administrator for the Science Mission Directorate beginning February 27, 2023. Recent Associate Administrators for the SMD include Edward J. Weiler (1998–2004, 2008–2011), Mary L. Cleave (2004–2005), Alan Stern (2007–2008), John M. Grunsfeld (2012–2016), and Thomas Zurbuchen (2016-2022). Stern resigned 25 March 2008, to be effective 11 April, over disagreements with Administrator Michael D. Griffin.

- Associate Administrator: Nicola Fox Assistant: Tricia Johnson
- Acting Deputy Associate Administrator: Mark Clampin
- Heliophysics Division Director: Joseph Westlake
- Earth Science Division Director: Karen St. Germain Assistant: Jacob Griffin
- Planetary Science Division Director: Louise M. Prockter
- Astrophysics Division Director:
- Biological and Physical Sciences Division Director: Lisa Carnell
- Resource Management Division Director: Holly Degn
- Joint Agency Satellite Division Director: John Gagosian
- Science Engagement and Partnerships Division Director: Kristen J Erickson

== See also ==
- Planetary Missions Program Office
- Discovery Program
- New Frontiers program
- NASA large strategic science missions
- Lunar Discovery and Exploration Program
