= Discovery Program =

Solar system exploration program by NASA

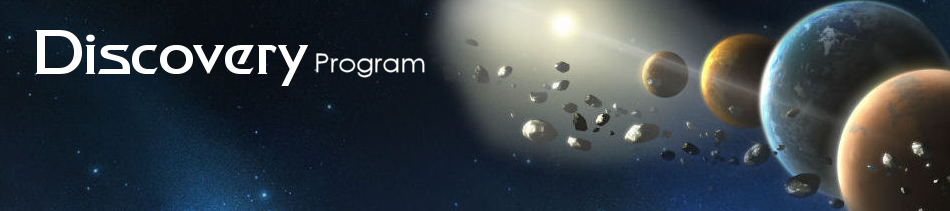
Header of the Discovery Program website (January 2016)

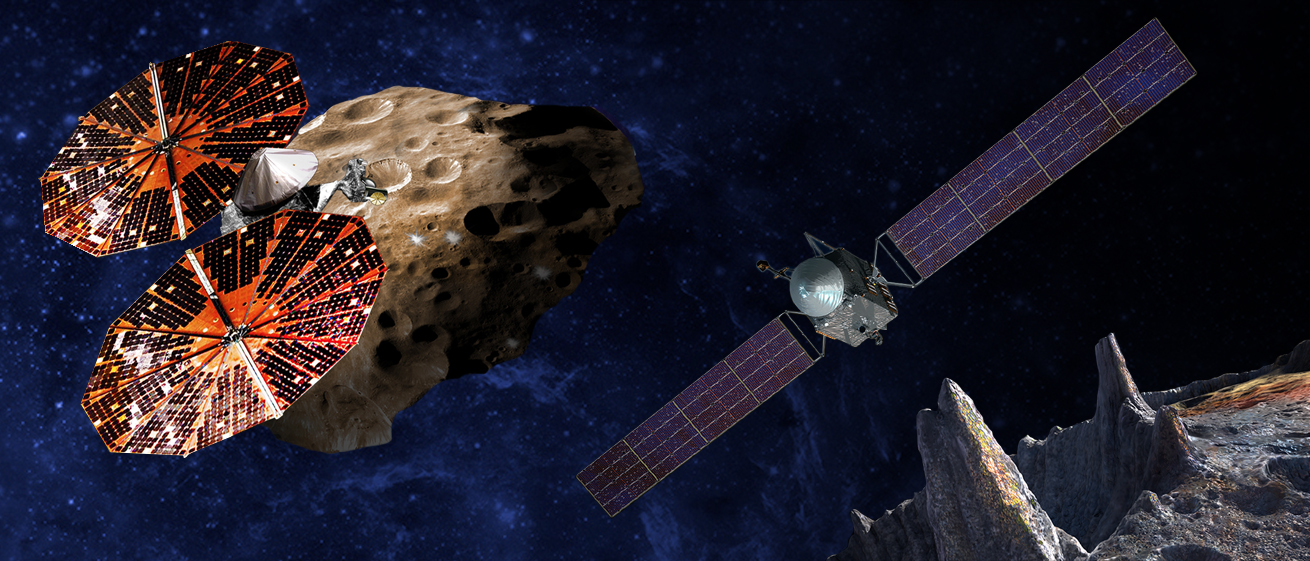
Depictions of the Lucy and Psyche missions

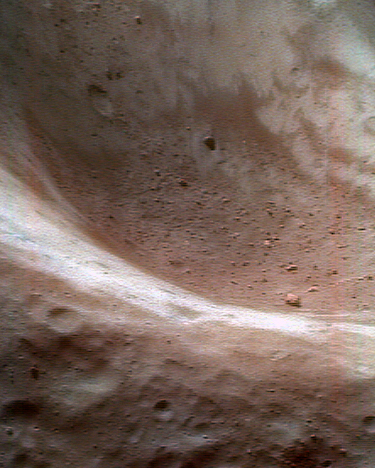
Asteroid Eros regolith, as viewed by Discovery's NEAR Shoemaker mission

The Discovery Program is a series of Solar System exploration missions funded by the U.S. National Aeronautics and Space Administration (NASA) through its Planetary Missions Program Office. The cost of each mission is capped at a lower level than missions from NASA's New Frontiers or Flagship Programs. As a result, Discovery missions tend to be more focused on a specific scientific goal rather than serving a general purpose.

The Discovery Program was founded in 1990. Existing NASA programs had specified mission targets and objectives in advance, then sought bidders to construct and operate them. In contrast, Discovery missions are solicited through a call for proposals on any science topic and assessed through peer review. Selected missions are led by a scientist called the principal investigator (PI) and may include contributions from industry, universities or government laboratories.

The Discovery Program also includes Missions of Opportunity, which fund U.S. participation in spacecraft operated by other space agencies, for example by contributing a single scientific instrument. It can also be used to re-purpose an existing NASA spacecraft for a new mission.

As of June 2021, the most recently selected Discovery missions were VERITAS and DAVINCI, the fifteenth and sixteenth missions in the program.

== History ==
In 1989, NASA's Solar System Exploration Division began to define a new strategy for Solar System exploration up to the year 2000. This included a Small Mission Program Group that investigated missions that would be low cost and allow focused scientific questions to be addressed in shorter time than existing programs. The result was a request for rapid studies of potential missions and NASA committed funding in 1990. The new program was called "Discovery".

The panel assessed several concepts that could be implemented as low-cost programs, selecting NEAR Shoemaker which became the first launch in the Discovery Program on February 17, 1996. The second mission, Mars Pathfinder, launched on December 4, 1996, carried the Sojourner rover to Mars.

== Missions ==
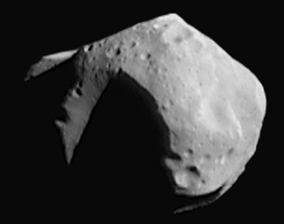
Asteroid 253 Mathilde

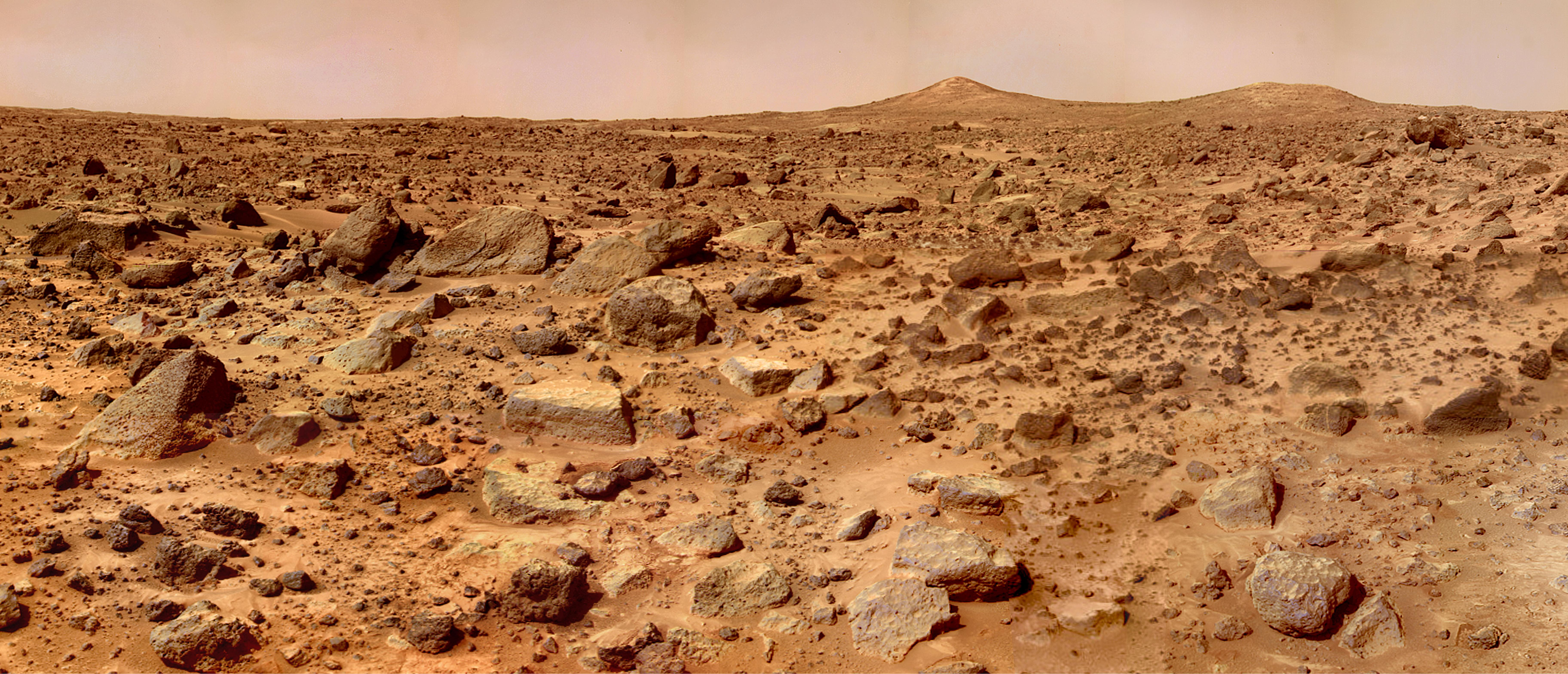
Mars Pathfinder's view of Ares Vallis

Animation of the rotation of 433 Eros.

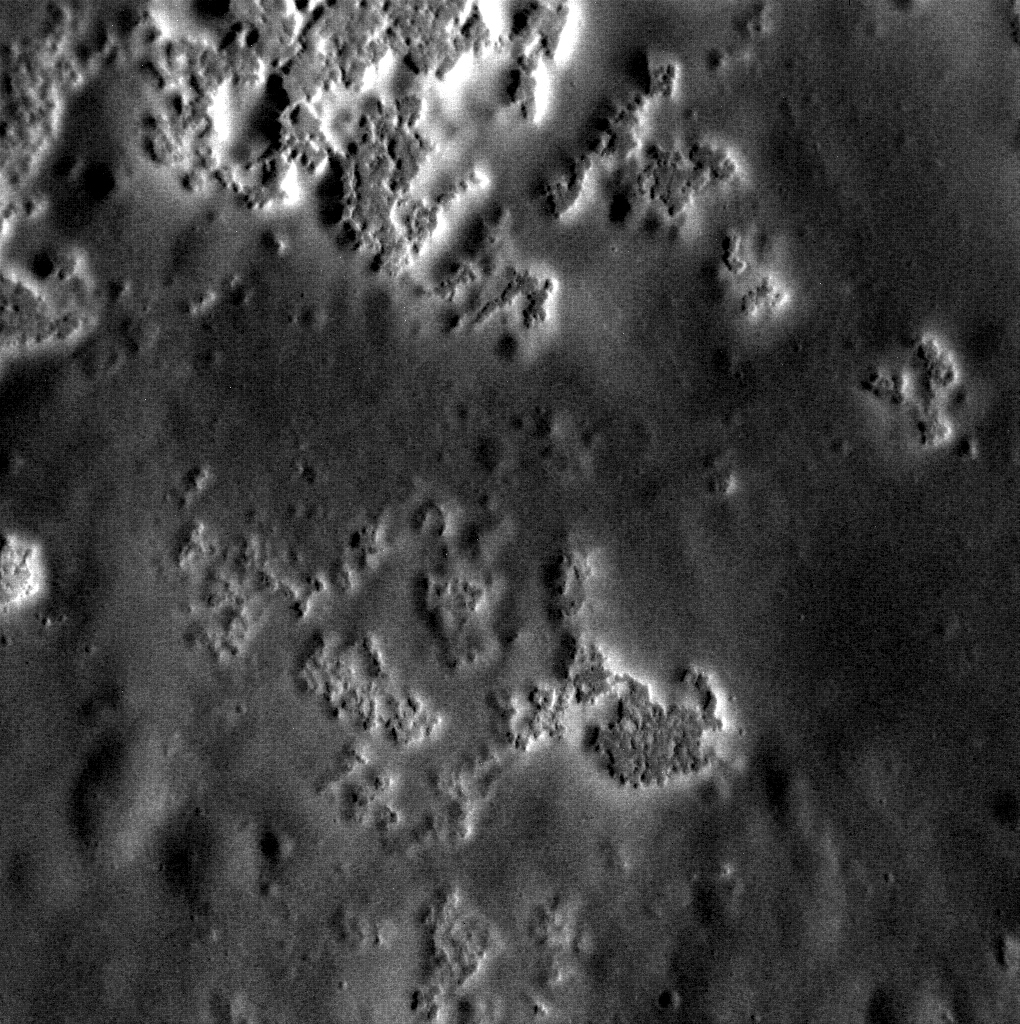
MESSENGER imaging Mercury's surface hollows at Sholem Aleichem.

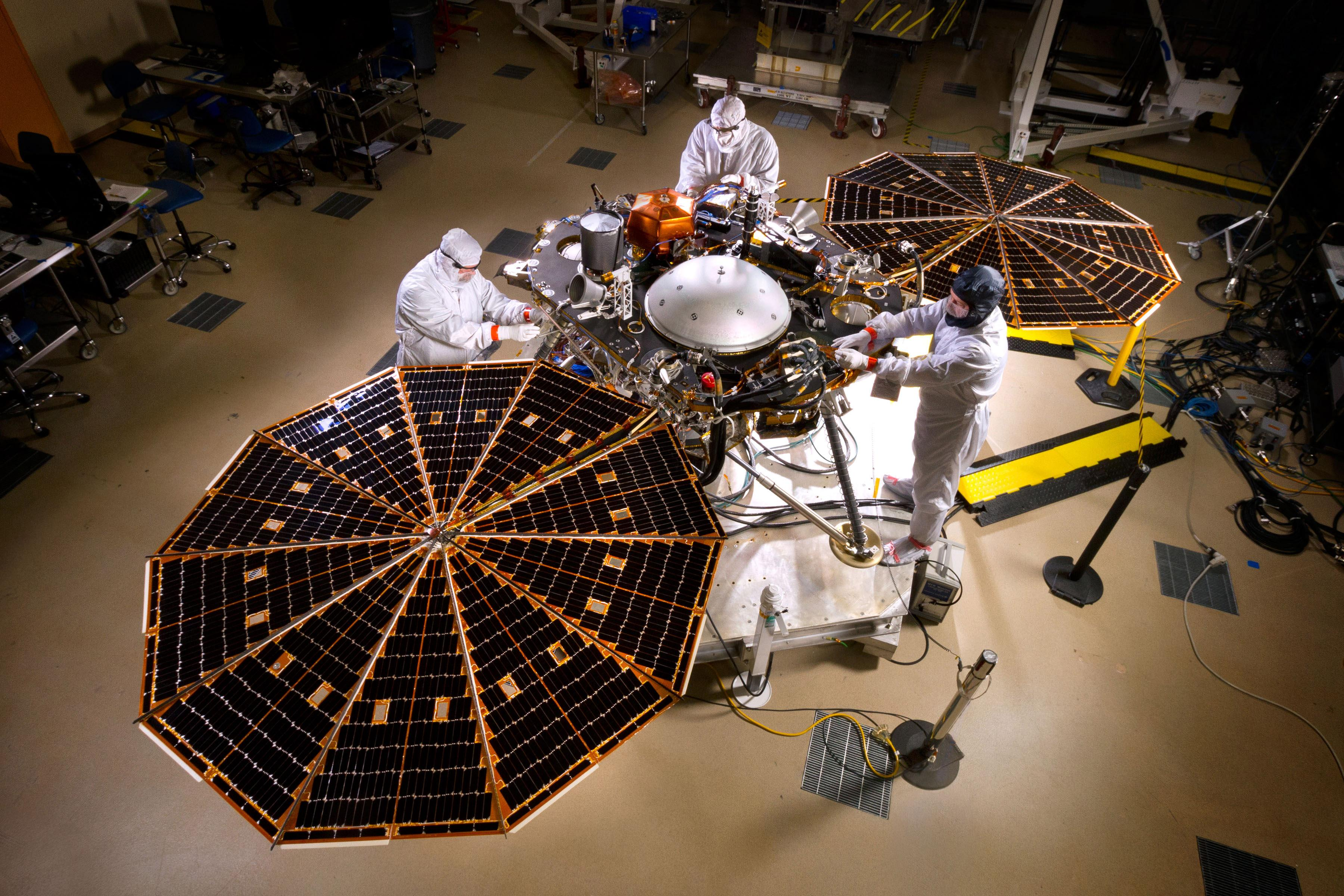
InSight lander in assembly (April 2015, NASA)

=== Standalone missions ===
Standalone Discovery Program missions
No.	Name	Targets	Launch date	Rocket	Launch mass	First science	Status	Principal investigator	Cost (million USD)
1	NEAR Shoemaker	433 Eros (lander), 253 Mathilde	February 17, 1996	Delta II; 7925–8	800 kg (1,800 lb)	June 1997	Completed in 2001	Andrew Cheng (APL)	224 (2000)
1	Near Earth Asteroid Rendezvous – Shoemaker (named after Eugene Shoemaker) was the first man-made object to both orbit and land on an asteroid. It carried many scientific instruments designed to study both 253 Mathilde and 433 Eros, such as a magnetometer, multi spectral imager, and an x-ray/gamma ray spectrometer. After a February 17, 1996, launch, it performed a flyby of 253 Mathilde on June 27, 1997, and an Earth flyby in 1998. It flew by 433 Eros once in 1998, before a second approach allowed it to enter orbit around Eros of February 14, 2000. After nearly a year of orbital observations, the spacecraft was landed on the asteroid on February 12, 2001, and continued to function successfully after touching down softly at under 2 m/s, becoming the first probe to soft-land on an asteroid. The probe continued to emit signals until February 28, 2001, and the final attempt to communicate with the spacecraft was on December 10, 2002.								
2	Mars Pathfinder	Mars (rover)	December 4, 1996	Delta II; 7925	890 kg (1,960 lb)	July 4, 1997	Completed in 1998	Joseph Boyce (JPL)	265 (1998)
2	Mars Pathfinder was a lander and rover designed to study Mars's geology and climate, as well as to demonstrate rover technology on another planet. It launched about a month after the Mars Global Surveyor, on December 4, 1996. After entering the Martian atmosphere, the hypersonic capsule deployed a complex landing system including a parachute and an airbag to hit the surface at 14 m/s. The lander deployed the Sojourner rover, weighing (10.5 kg), on the Martian surface on July 5, 1997, on Mars's Ares Vallis, thus becoming the first rover to operate outside the Earth-Moon system. It carried a series of scientific instruments to analyze the Martian atmosphere, climate, geology and the composition of its rocks and soil. It completed its primary and extended mission and after over 80 days, the last signal was sent on September 27, 1997. The mission was terminated on March 10, 1998.								
3	Lunar Prospector	Moon	January 7, 1998	Athena II [Star-3700S]	296 kg (653 lb)	January 16, 1998	Completed in 1999	Alan Binder	63 (1998)
3	Lunar Prospector was a lunar orbiter to characterize the lunar mineralogy, including polar ice deposits, measure magnetic and gravitational fields, and study lunar outgassing events. After preliminary mappings, it achieved the targeted primary Lunar orbit on January 16. The primary mission in this orbit lasted one year until January 28, 1999, followed up by a half-year extended mission in a lower orbit for higher resolution. On July 31, 1999, it deliberately impacted into the Shoemaker crater near the Lunar South pole in an attempt to produce water vapor plumes that would be observable from Earth.								
4	Stardust	81P/Wild (sample collect), 5535 Annefrank, Tempel 1	February 7, 1999	Delta II; 7426–9.5	391 kg (862 lb)	November 2, 2002	Completed in 2011	Donald Brownlee (UW)	200 (2011)
4	Stardust was a mission to collect interstellar dust and dust particles from the nucleus of comet 81P/Wild for study on Earth. After a flyby of Earth and then of asteroid 5535 Annefrank in November 2002, it performed a flyby of comet Wild 2 in January 2004, during which the Sample Collection plate collected dust grain samples from the coma. Samples were stored in a return capsule which landed on Earth on January 15, 2006. Scientists worldwide are currently studying the comet dust samples while citizen scientists are attempting to find interstellar dust bits through the Stardust@home project, and in 2014, scientists announced the identification of possible interstellar dust particles. Meanwhile, the spacecraft was diverted for a flyby of Tempel 1 comet, as part of Stardust-NExT extension, to observe the crater left by Deep Impact. Stardust did a final burn to deplete its remaining fuel on March 21, 2011.								
5	Genesis	Solar wind (collect at Sun–Earth L_{1})	August 8, 2001	Delta II; 7326	494 kg (1,089 lb)(dry)	December 3, 2001	Completed in 2004	Donald Burnett (Caltech)	209 (2004)
5	Genesis was a mission to collect solar wind charged particles for analysis on Earth. After reaching L_{1} orbit on November 16, 2001, it collected solar wind for 850 days between 2001 and 2004. It left Lissajous orbit and began its return to Earth on April 22, 2004, but on September 8, 2004, the sample-return capsule's parachute failed to deploy, and the capsule crashed into the Utah desert. However, solar wind samples were salvaged and are available for study. Despite the hard landing, Genesis has met or anticipates meeting all of its baseline science objectives.								
6	CONTOUR	Encke, Schwassmann-Wachmann-3	July 3, 2002	Delta II 7425 [Star-30BP]	398 kg (877 lb)	—	Disintegrated after launch	Joseph Veverka (Cornell)	154 (1997)
6	Comet Nucleus Tour was a mission to visit and study at least 2 comets. On August 15, 2002, the spacecraft disintegrated during a planned maneuver that was intended to propel it out of Earth orbit and into its comet-chasing solar orbit. The investigation board concluded the probable cause was structural failure of the spacecraft due to plume heating during the Star-30 solid-rocket motor burn.								
7	MESSENGER	Mercury, Venus (flyby)	August 3, 2004	Delta II; 7925H-9.5	1,108 kg (2,443 lb)	August 2005	Completed in 2015	Sean Solomon (APL)	450 (2015)
7	Mercury Surface, Space Environment, Geochemistry and Ranging was an orbiter which conducted the first orbital study of Mercury. Its science goals were to provide the first images of the entire planet and collect detailed information on the composition and structure of Mercury's crust, its geologic history, the nature of its thin atmosphere and active magnetosphere, and the makeup of its core and polar materials. It was only the second spacecraft to flyby Mercury, after Mariner 10 in 1975. After one Earth flyby, two of Venus and three of Mercury, it finally entered orbit around Mercury on March 18, 2011. The primary science mission began on April 4, 2011, and lasted until March 17, 2012. It achieved 100% mapping of Mercury on March 6, 2013, and completed its first year-long extended mission on March 17, 2013. After another mission extension, the spacecraft ran out of propellant and was deorbited on April 30, 2015.								
8	Deep Impact	Tempel 1 (impactor), 103P/Hartley	January 12, 2005	Delta II; 7925	650 kg (1,430 lb)	April 25, 2005	Completed in 2013	Michael A'Hearn (UMD)	330 (2005)
8	Deep Impact was a space probe launched with the goal to both flyby and impact the comet Tempel 1. It was launched from Cape Canaveral Air Force Station on January 12, 2005. The spacecraft released a 350 kg impactor into the path of comet Tempel 1 on July 3, 2005, and the impact occurred on July 4, 2005, releasing an energy equivalent of 4.7 tons of TNT. The resulting impact plume was observed by the spacecraft and other space-based observatories. The 2007 Stardust spacecraft NExT mission determined the resulting crater's diameter to be 150 meters (490 ft). After the successful completion of its mission, the main spacecraft was put in hibernation before being reactivated for a new mission designated EPOXI. On November 4, 2010, it performed a flyby of comet Hartley 2. In 2012 it performed long-distance observations of comet Garradd C/2009 P1, and in 2013 of Comet ISON. Contact was abruptly lost in August 2013, later attributed to a Y2K-like integer overflow software bug.								
9	Dawn	4 Vesta, Ceres	September 27, 2007	Delta II; 7925H	1,218 kg (2,685 lb)	May 3, 2011	Completed in 2018	Christopher T. Russell (UCLA)	472 (2015)
9	Dawn was the first spacecraft to orbit two extraterrestrial bodies, the two most massive objects of the asteroid belt: the protoplanet Vesta and the dwarf planet Ceres. The spacecraft employed highly efficient ion thrusters, with just 425 kg of xenon for the entire mission after escaping Earth. After a 2009 Mars flyby, it entered orbit around Vesta on July 16, 2011. It entered its lowest Vesta orbit on December 8, 2011, and after a year-long Vesta mission of observing surface terrain and mineral composition, left its orbit on September 5, 2012. It entered Ceres's orbit on March 6, 2015, becoming the first spacecraft to visit a dwarf planet, and began its lowest orbit on December 16. In June 2016 it was approved for an extended mission at Ceres. On October 19, 2017, NASA announced that the mission would be extended until its hydrazine fuel ran out, which occurred on October 31, 2018. The spacecraft is currently in an uncontrolled orbit around Ceres.								
10	Kepler space telescope	transiting exoplanet survey	March 7, 2009	Delta II; 7925-10L	1,052 kg (2,319 lb)	May 12, 2009	Completed in 2018	William Borucki (NASA Ames)	640 (2009)
10	Kepler was a space observatory named after Johannes Kepler in a heliocentric, Earth-trailing orbit tasked to explore the structure and diversity of exoplanet systems, with a special emphasis on the detection of Earth-size planets in orbit around stars outside the Solar System. Initially planned for 3.5 years, the spacecraft functioned for about 10 years, including a K2 "Second Light" mission extension with reduced precision owing to failing reaction wheels. By 2015, the spacecraft had detected over 2,300 confirmed planets, including hot Jupiters, super-Earths, circumbinary planets, and planets located in the circumstellar habitable zones of their host stars. In addition, Kepler detected over 3,600 unconfirmed planet candidates and over 2,000 eclipsing binary stars. The telescope was retired on October 30, 2018, after depleting its fuel.								
11	GRAIL	Moon	September 10, 2011	Delta II; 7920H-10C	307 kg (677 lb)	March 7, 2012	Completed in 2012	Maria Zuber (MIT)	496 (2011)
11	Gravity Recovery and Interior Laboratory was a Moon orbiter that provided higher-quality gravitational field mapping of the Moon to determine its interior structure. The two small spacecraft GRAIL A (Ebb) and GRAIL B (Flow) separated soon after the launch and entered Lunar orbits on December 31, 2011, and January 1, 2012, respectively. The primary scientific phase was achieved in May 2012. After the extended mission phase, the two spacecraft impacted the Moon on December 17, 2012. MoonKAM (Moon Knowledge Acquired by Middle school students) was an education related sub-program and instrument of this mission.								
12	InSight	Mars (lander)	May 5, 2018	Atlas V (401)	721 kg (1,590 lb)	November 2018	Completed in 2022	W. Bruce Banerdt (JPL)	830 (2016)
12	Interior Exploration using Seismic Investigations, Geodesy and Heat Transport is a 358 kg lander reusing technology from the Mars Phoenix lander. It was intended to study the interior structure and composition of Mars as well as to detect Marsquakes and other seismic activity, advancing understanding of the formation and evolution of terrestrial planets. Its launch was delayed from 2016 to May 2018. The lander touched down successfully on November 26, 2018, at a site about 600 km (370 mi) from the Curiosity rover. It detected its first possible quake on April 6, 2019. Dust accumulating on the lander's solar arrays gradually reduced available power over the course of the mission, and contact was lost on December 15, 2022.								
13	Lucy	Jupiter trojans	October 16, 2021	Atlas V 401	1,550 kg (3,417 lb)	2025	En route	Harold F. Levison (SwRI)	450+ 148
13	Lucy is a space probe that will study multiple Jupiter trojan asteroids. Named after the hominin Lucy, it will tour six Trojan asteroids in order to better understand the formation and evolution of the Solar System. It was launched in October 2021. Lucy will make two Earth flybys before arriving at Jupiter's L4 Trojan cloud in 2027 to visit 3548 Eurybates (with its satellite), 15094 Polymele, 11351 Leucus, and 21900 Orus. After an Earth flyby, Lucy will arrive at the L5 Trojan cloud (trails behind Jupiter) to visit the 617 Patroclus−Menoetius binary in 2033. It flew by the inner main-belt asteroid 52246 Donaldjohanson in 2025.								
14	Psyche	16 Psyche	October 13, 2023	Falcon Heavy	2,608 kg	2029	En route	Lindy Elkins-Tanton (ASU)	450+ 117
14	Psyche is an orbiter that will travel to and study the asteroid 16 Psyche, the most massive metallic asteroid in the asteroid belt, thought to be the exposed iron core of a protoplanet. Launched on 13 October 2023, it will arrive in 2029. It carries an imager, a magnetometer, and a gamma-ray spectrometer.								
15	DAVINCI	Venus	December 2030				In development	James B. Garvin (GSFC)	500
15	Deep Atmosphere Venus Investigation of Noble Gases, Chemistry, and Imaging is an atmospheric probe that will study the chemical composition of Venus's atmosphere during descent. These measurements are important to understanding the origin of the Venusian atmosphere, how it has evolved, and how and why it is different from Earth and Mars. DAVINCI's measurements will reveal the history of water on Venus and the chemical processes at work in the unexplored lower atmosphere. Before it reaches the surface, the DAVINCI probe will take the first ever photos of the planet's intriguing, ridged terrain ("tesserae") to explore its origin and tectonic, volcanic, and weathering history. The launch is planned for 2031–2032.								
16	VERITAS	Venus	November 2032				In development	Suzanne E. Smrekar (JPL)	500
16	Venus Emissivity, Radio Science, InSAR, Topography, and Spectroscopy is an orbiter mission that will map the surface of Venus with high resolution. A combination of topography, near-infrared spectroscopy, and radar image measurements would provide knowledge of Venus's tectonic and impact history, gravity, geochemistry, the timing and mechanisms of volcanic resurfacing, and the mantle processes responsible for them. The launch is planned for 2031.								

=== Missions of opportunity ===
These provide opportunities to participate in non-NASA missions by providing funding for a science instrument or hardware components of an instrument, or for an extended mission for a spacecraft that may differ from its original purpose.

- ASPERA-3, an instrument designed to study the interaction between the solar wind and the atmosphere of Mars, is flying on board the European Space Agency's Mars Express orbiter. Launched on 2 June 2003, it has been orbiting Mars since 30 December 2003. The Principal Investigator is David Winningham of Southwest Research Institute.
- A NASA contribution to the joint ESA - CNES NetLander Mars meteorological mission was planned, consisting of meteorological, seismic, and geodetic instruments; however, the mission was terminated prior to its 2007 launch.
- Moon Mineralogy Mapper (M3) is a NASA-designed instrument placed on board the ISRO's Chandrayaan orbiter selected in February 2005. Launched in 2008, it was designed to explore the Moon's mineral composition at high resolution. M3's detection of water on the Moon was announced in late September 2009, one month after the mission ended. The Principal Investigator was Carle Pieters of Brown University.
- Extrasolar Planet Observation and Deep Impact Extended Investigation (EPOXI) was selected in July 2007. It was a series of two new missions for the existing Deep Impact probe following its success at Tempel 1:
  - The Extrasolar Planet Observations and Characterization (EPOCh) mission used the Deep Impact high-resolution camera in 2008 to better characterize known giant extrasolar planets orbiting other stars and to search for additional planets in the same system, as well as to investigate possible moons and ring systems of said exoplanets. A secondary science goal was to better observe the earth in both infrared and visible light, in order to create better computer models of exoplanets. The Principal Investigator was L. Drake Deming of NASA's Goddard Space Flight Center.
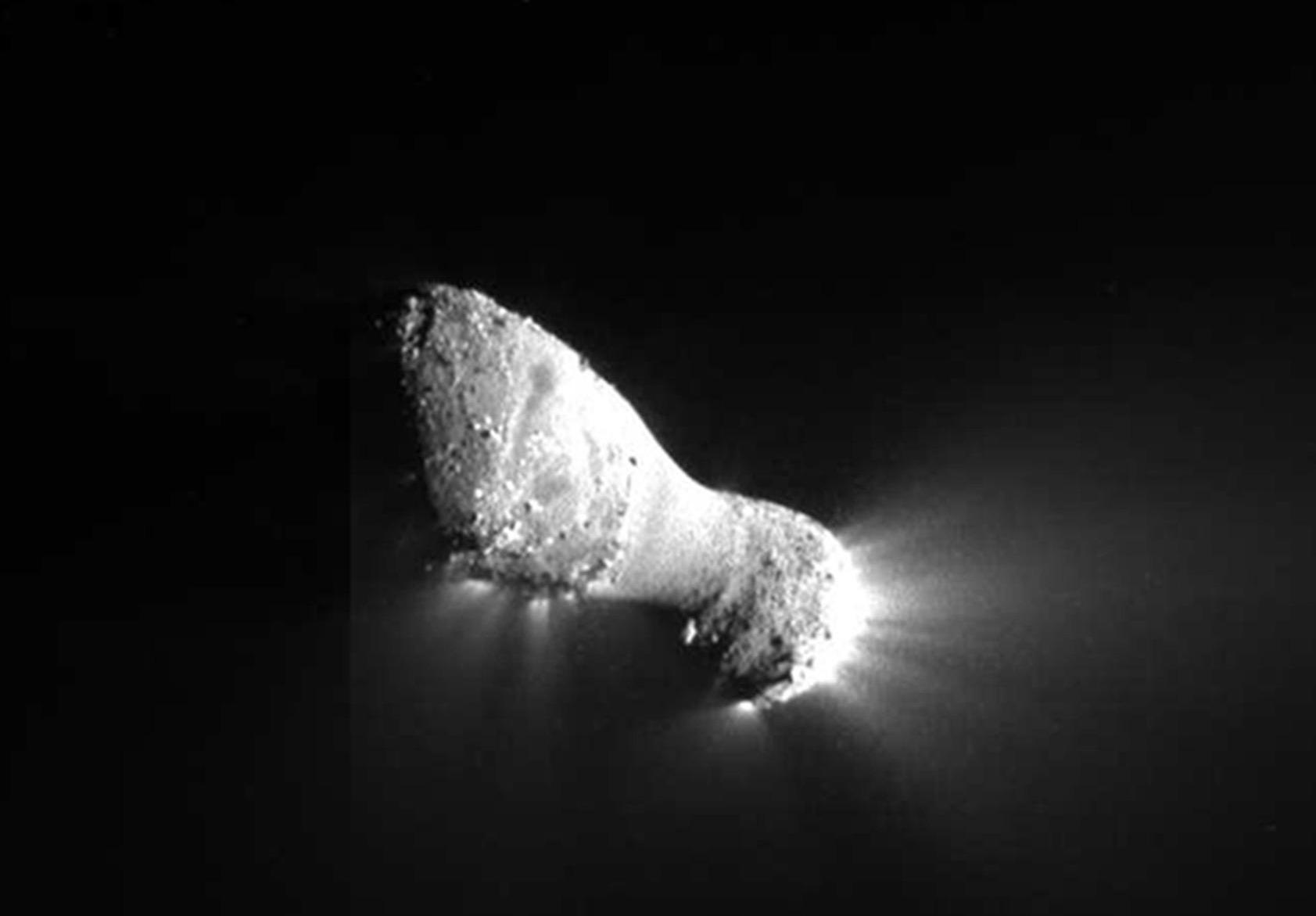
    Nucleus of Comet Hartley 2 imaged by Deep Impact
  - The Deep Impact eXtended Investigation of Comets (DIXI) mission used the Deep Impact spacecraft for a flyby mission to a second comet, Hartley 2. The goal was to take pictures of its nucleus to increase our understanding of the diversity of comets. The flyby of Hartley 2 was successful with closest approach occurring on November 4, 2010. Michael A'Hearn of the University of Maryland was the Principal Investigator.
- New Exploration of Tempel 1 (NExT) was selected in July 2007 together with the EPOXI extension. It was a new mission for the Stardust spacecraft to fly by comet Tempel 1 in 2011 and observe changes since the Deep Impact mission visited it in July 2005. Later in 2005, Tempel 1 made its closest approach to the Sun, possibly changing the surface of the comet. The flyby was completed successfully on February 15, 2011. Joseph Veverka of Cornell University is the Principal Investigator.
- Strofio is a mass spectrometer that is a part of the SERENA instrument package on board the Mercury Planetary Orbiter component of the ESA's BepiColombo mission. Strofio will study the atoms and molecules that compose Mercury's atmosphere to reveal the composition of the planet's surface. Stefano Livi of Southwest Research Institute is the Principal Investigator.
- MEGANE (Mars-moon Exploration with GAmma rays and NEutrons) is an instrument aboard the Martian Moons Exploration (MMX) probe, a Japanese Aerospace Exploration Agency (JAXA) mission to Phobos and Deimos. MEGANE includes a gamma-ray spectrometer and a neutron spectrometer. David J. Lawrence of Johns Hopkins University is the Principal Investigator.
- In addition, the Lunar Reconnaissance Orbiter was temporarily managed under the Discovery Program from the termination of the Lunar Precursor Robotic Program until the creation of the Lunar Discovery and Exploration Program.

== Proposals and concepts ==
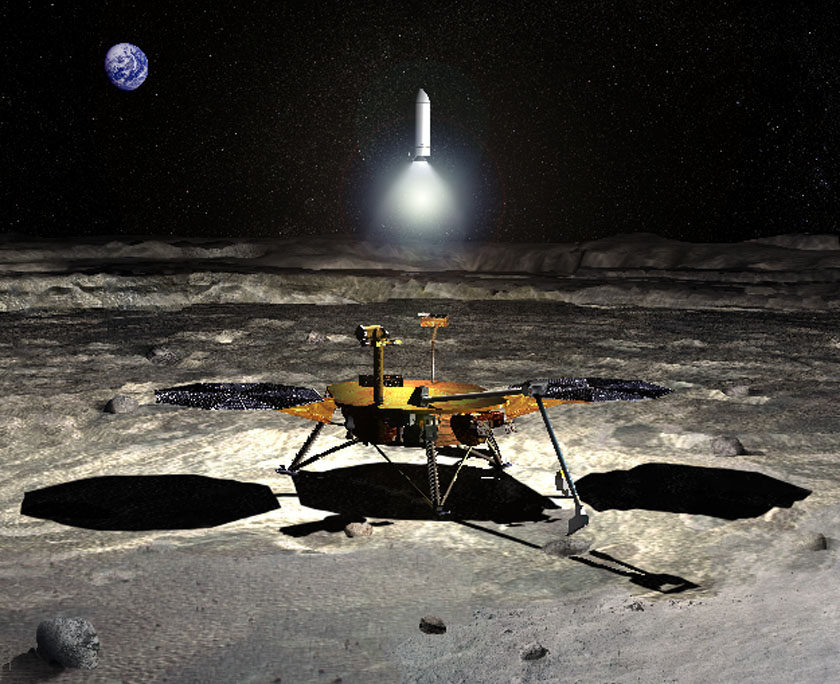
Possible configuration of a lunar sample return spacecraft

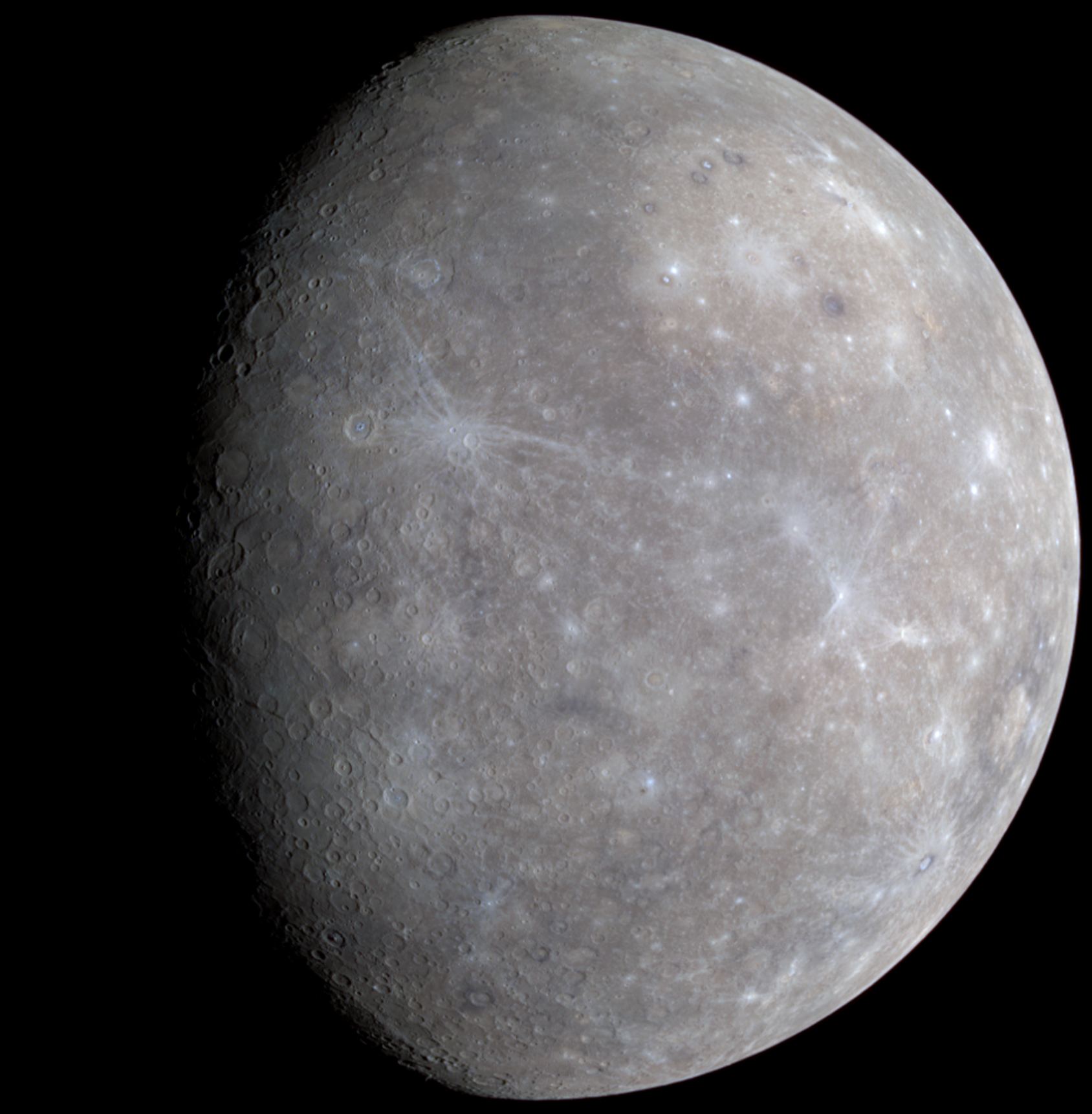
Mercury by Discovery's MESSENGER

However often the funding comes in, there is a selection process with perhaps two dozen concepts. These sometimes get further matured and re-proposed in another selection or program. An example of this is Suess-Urey Mission, which was passed over in favor of the successful Stardust mission, but was eventually flown as Genesis, while a more extensive mission similar to INSIDE was flown as Juno in the New Frontiers program. Some of these concepts went on to become actual missions, or similar concepts were eventually realized in another mission class. This list is a mix of previous and current proposals.

Additional examples of Discovery-class mission proposals include:

- Whipple, a space-observatory to detect objects in the Oort cloud by transit method.
- Io Volcano Observer, was proposed for missions 15 or 16, a Jupiter orbiter designed to make 10 flybys of the volcanically active moon Io.
- Comet Hopper (CHopper), a mission to comet 46P/Wirtanen that would've utilised multiple short flights to repeatedly land on the comet's nucleus in order to map various geological processes such as outgassing.
- Titan Mare Explorer (TiME), a lander mission to explore one of the methane lakes found in the north polar region of Titan, a moon of Saturn.
- Suess-Urey, similar to the later Genesis mission.
- Hermes, a Mercury orbiter. (similar to the MESSENGER Mercury orbiter)
- INSIDE Jupiter, an orbiter that would map Jupiter's magnetic and gravity fields in an effort to study the giant planet's interior structure. The concept was further matured and implemented as Juno in the New Frontiers program.
- The Dust Telescope, a space observatory that would measure various properties of incoming cosmic dust. The dust telescope would combine a trajectory sensor and a mass spectrometer, to allow the elemental and even isotopic composition to be analyzed.
- OSIRIS (Origins Spectral Interpretation, Resource Identification and Security), an asteroid observation and sample return mission concept selected in 2006 for further concept studies. It further matured and launched September 8, 2016, as OSIRIS-REx in the New Frontiers Program.
- Small Body Grand Tour, an asteroid rendezvous mission. This 1993 concept reviews possible targets for what became NEAR— 4660 Nereus and 2019 Van Albada. Other targets considered for an extended mission included Encke's comet (2P), 433 Eros, 1036 Ganymed, 4 Vesta, and 4015 Wilson–Harrington (1979 VA). (NEAR Shoemaker visited 433 Eros and Dawn visited 4 Vesta)
- Comet Coma Rendezvous Sample Return, a spacecraft designed to rendezvous with a comet, make extended observations within the cometary coma (but not land on the comet), gently collect multiple coma samples, and return them to Earth for study. (Similar to Stardust)
- Micro Exo Explorer, a spacecraft that would've utilised a new form of micro-electric propulsion, called 'Micro Electro-fluidic-spray Propulsion' to travel to a near Earth object and gather important data.

=== Mars focused ===
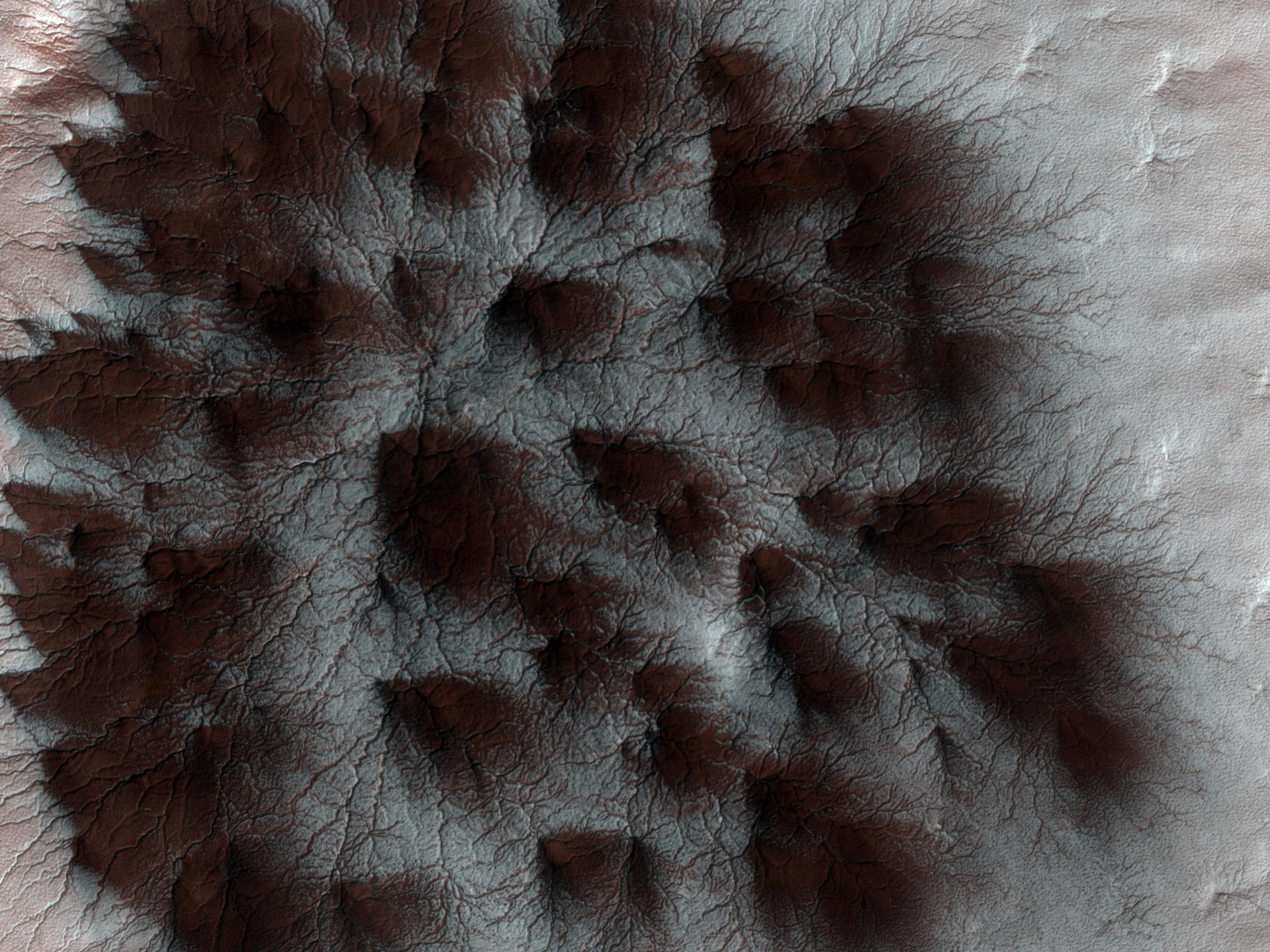
Mars Geyser Hopper would investigate 'spider' features on Mars, as imaged by an orbiter. Image size: 1 km (0.62 mi) across.

- Pascal, a Mars climate network mission.
- MUADEE (Mars Upper Atmosphere Dynamics, Energetics, and Evolution), an orbiter mission designed to study Mars's upper atmosphere. (similar to MAVEN of the Mars Scout program)
- PCROSS, similar to LCROSS, but directed towards Mars's moon Phobos.
- Merlin, a mission that would place a lander on Mars's moon Deimos.
- Mars Moons Multiple Landings Mission (M4), would conduct multiple landings on Phobos and Deimos.
- Hall, a Phobos and Deimos sample return mission.
- Aladdin, a Phobos and Deimos sample return mission. It was a finalist in the 1999 Discovery selection, with a planned launch in 2001 and return of the samples by 2006. Sample collection was intended to work by sending projectiles into the moons, then collecting the ejecta by means of a collector spacecraft flyby.
- Mars Geyser Hopper, a lander that would investigate the springtime carbon dioxide Martian geysers found in regions around the Martian south pole.
- MAGIC (Mars Geoscience Imaging at Centimeter-scale), an orbiter that would provide images of the Martian surface at 5–10 cm/pixel, permitting resolution of features as small as 20–40 cm.
- Red Dragon, a Mars lander and sample return.

=== Lunar focused ===
- Lunar sample return from the South Pole–Aitken basin, current geological models don't adequately describe the area and this mission would have attempted to solve this issue.
- EXOMOON, in situ investigation on Earth's Moon.
- PSOLHO, would use the Moon as an occulter to look for exoplanets.
- Lunette, a lunar lander.
- Twin Lunar Lander, a double lander mission to better understand the Moon's evolution and geology.

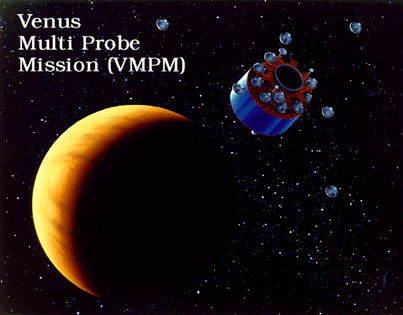
The Venus Multiprobe Mission involved sending 16 atmospheric probes into Venus in 1999.

=== Venus focused ===
- Venus Multiprobe, proposed for a 1999 launch, would have dropped 16 atmospheric probes into Venus, which would fall slowly to the surface, taking pressure and temperature measurements.
- Vesper, a concept for a Venus orbiter focused on studying the planet's atmosphere. It was one of three concepts to receive funds for further study in the 2006 Discovery selection. Osiris and GRAIL were the other two, and eventually GRAIL was chosen and went on to be launched.
- V-STAR (Venus Sample Targeting, Attainment and Return), a Venus sample return mission with a goal of understanding Venus's evolution. The mission would have consisted of a Venus orbiter with an attached lander. The lander would fall through the Venusian atmosphere, collecting samples along the way, as well as after landing through the use of a "mole". Said lander would launch those samples into a low orbit, where they would rendezvous with the orbiter, returning the samples to Earth.
- VEVA (Venus Exploration of Volcanoes and Atmosphere), an atmospheric probe for Venus. The main component is a 7-day balloon flight through the atmosphere accompanied by various small probes dropped deeper into the planet's thick gases.
- Venus Pathfinder, a long-duration Venus lander.
- RAVEN, a Venus orbiter radar mapping mission.
- VALOR, a Venus mission to study its atmosphere with a balloon. Twin balloons would circumnavigate the planet over 8 Earth-days.
- Venus Aircraft, a robotic atmospheric flight on Venus's atmosphere using a long-duration solar-powered aircraft system. It would carry 1.5 kg of scientific payload and would contend with violent wind, heat and a corrosive atmosphere.
- Zephyr, a rover concept that would be propelled by the wind force on its vertical wingsail. Conceived in 2012, the project has since made progress in developing electronic components that would allow the vehicle to operate for 50 days on the surface of Venus without a cooling system.
- VenSAR (Venus Synthetic Aperture Radar) was a proposed but abandoned "Mission of Opportunity" to fly a NASA-managed instrument aboard ESA's EnVision Venus orbiter. The principal investigator was to be Scott Hensley, Jet Propulsion Laboratory NASA/California Institute of Technology.. However, the mission was cancelled due to NASA budgetary cuts and ESA pursued a European SAR instrument instead.

== Selection process ==
=== Discovery 1 and 2 ===
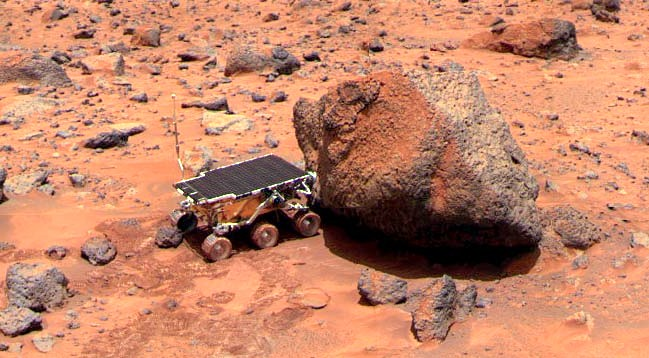
Mars Pathfinder's Sojourner rover taking its Alpha Particle X-ray Spectrometer measurement of the Yogi Rock (1997)

The first two Discovery missions were Near Earth Asteroid Rendezvous (NEAR) (later called Shoemaker NEAR) and Mars Pathfinder. These initial missions did not follow the same selection process that started once the program was under-way. Mars Pathfinder was salvaged from the idea for a technology and EDL demonstrator from the Mars Environmental Survey program. One of the goals of Pathfinder was to support the Mars Surveyor program. Later missions would be selected by a more sequential process involving Announcements of Opportunity.

In the case of NEAR, a working group for the program recommended that the first mission should be to a near-Earth asteroid. A series of proposals limited to missions to a near-Earth asteroid missions were reviewed in 1991. What would be the NEAR spacecraft mission was formally selected in December 1993, after which began a 2-year development period prior to launch. NEAR was launched on February 15, 1996, and arrived to orbit asteroid Eros on February 14, 2000. Mars Pathfinder launched on December 4, 1996, and landed on Mars on July 4, 1997, bringing along with it the first NASA Mars rover, Sojourner.

=== Discovery 3 and 4 ===
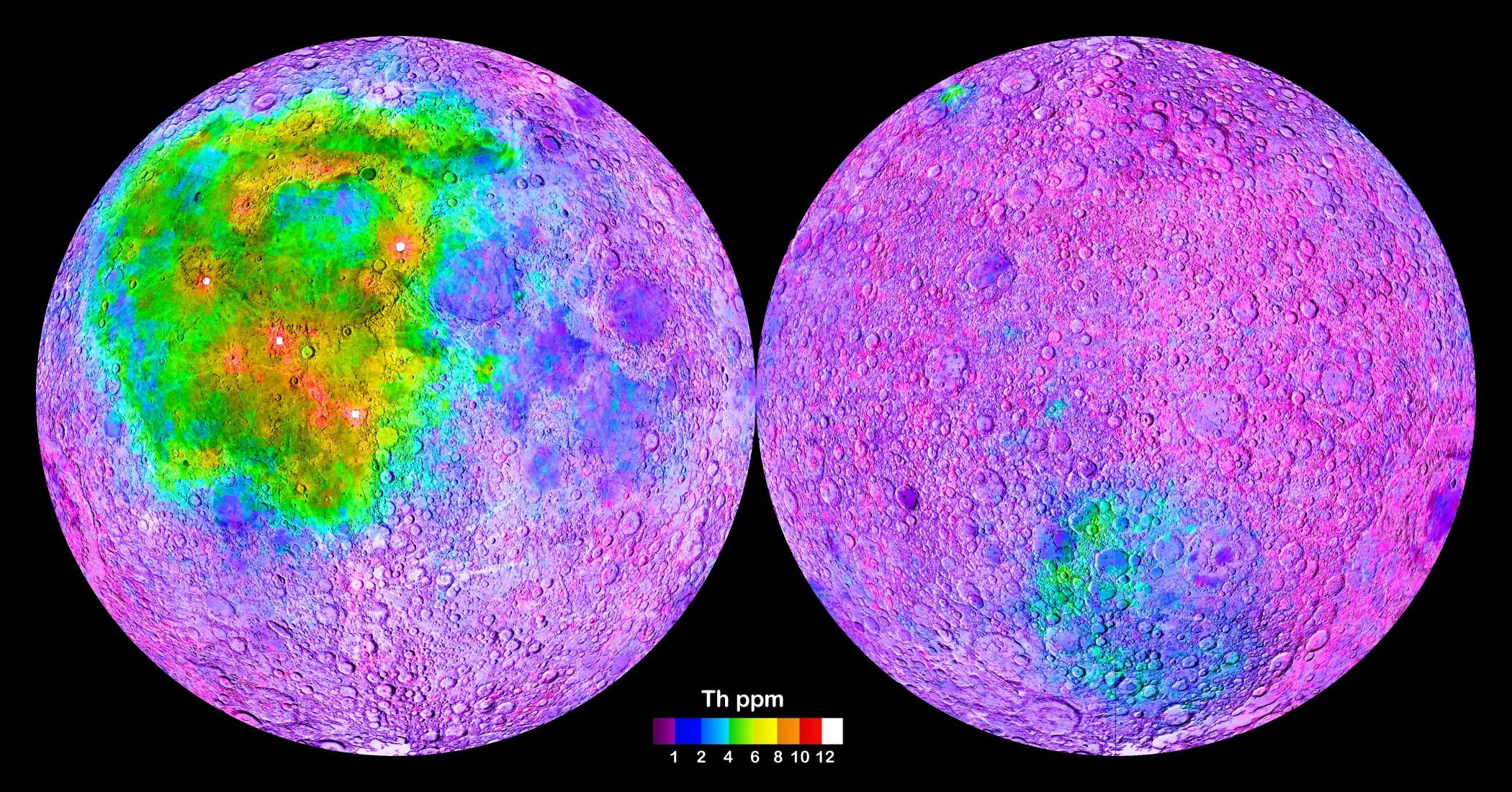
Thorium concentrations on the Moon, as mapped by Lunar Prospector

In August 1994, NASA made an Announcement of Opportunity for the next proposed Discovery missions. There were 28 proposals submitted to NASA in October 1994:

1. ASTER - Asteroid Earth Return
2. Comet Nucleus Penetrator
3. Comet Nucleus Tour (CONTOUR)
4. Cometary Coma Chemical Composition (C4)
5. Diana (Lunar and Cometary Mission)
6. FRESIP-A mission to Find the Frequency of Earth-sized Inner Planets
7. Hermes Global Orbiter (Mercury Orbiter)
8. Icy Moon Mission (Lunar Orbiter)
9. Interlune-One (Lunar Rovers)
10. Jovian Integrated Synoptic Telescope (IO Torus investigation)
11. Lunar Discovery Orbiter
12. Lunar Prospector (Lunar Orbiter) – chosen in February 1995 for Discovery 3.
13. Mainbelt Asteroid Exploration/Rendezvous
14. Mars Aerial Platform (Atmospheric)
15. Mars Polar Pathfinder (Polar Lander)
16. Mars Upper Atmosphere Dynamics, Energetics and Evolution
17. Mercury Polar Flyby
18. Near Earth Asteroid Returned Sample
19. Origin of Asteroids, Comets and Life on Earth
20. PELE: A Lunar Mission to Study Planetary Volcanism
21. Planetary Research Telescope
22. Rendezvous with a Comet Nucleus (RECON)
23. Suess-Urey (Solar Wind Sample Return) – Discovery 4 finalist.
24. Small Missions to Asteroids and Comets
25. Stardust (Cometary/Interstellar Dust Return) – Discovery 4 finalist.
26. Venus Composition Probe (Atmospheric)
27. Venus Environmental Satellite (Atmospheric)
28. Venus Multi-Probe Mission (Atmospheric) – Discovery 4 finalist.

In February 1995, Lunar Prospector, a lunar orbiter mission, was selected for launch. Three other missions were left to undergo a further selection later in 1995 for the fourth Discovery mission: Stardust, Suess-Urey, and Venus Multiprobe. Stardust, a comet sample-return mission, was selected in November 1995 over the two other finalists.

=== Discovery 5 and 6 ===
In October 1997, NASA selected Genesis and CONTOUR as the next Discovery missions, out of 34 proposals that were submitted in December 1996.

The five finalists were:

- Aladdin (Mars moon sample return)
- Comet Nucleus Tour (CONTOUR)
- Genesis (Solar wind sample return)
- Mercury Surface, Space Environment, Geochemistry and Ranging mission (MESSENGER)
- Venus Environmental Satellite (VESAT)

=== Discovery 7 and 8 ===
Deep Impact impacted a comet nucleus

In July 1999, NASA selected MESSENGER and Deep Impact as the next Discovery Program missions. MESSENGER was the first Mercury orbiter and mission to that planet since Mariner 10. Both missions targeted a launch in late 2004 and the cost was constrained at about US$300 million each.

In 1998 five finalists had been selected to receive US$375,000 to further mature their design concept. The five proposals were selected out of about 30 with the goal of achieving the best science. Those missions were:

- Aladdin
- Deep Impact
- MESSENGER
- INSIDE Jupiter
- Vesper

Aladdin and MESSENGER were also finalists in the 1997 selection.

=== Discovery 9 and 10 ===
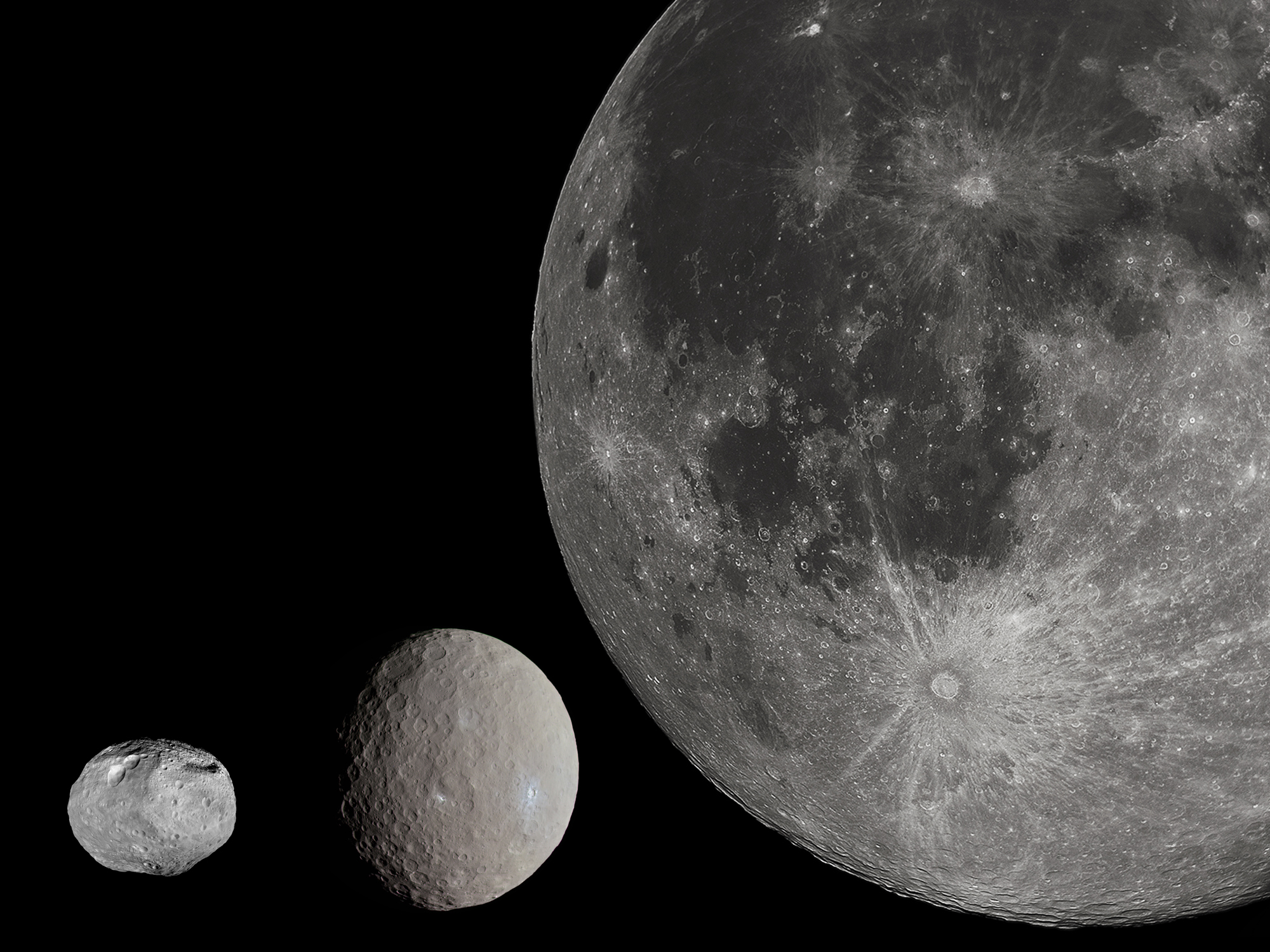
Scale comparison of Vesta, Ceres, and the Moon

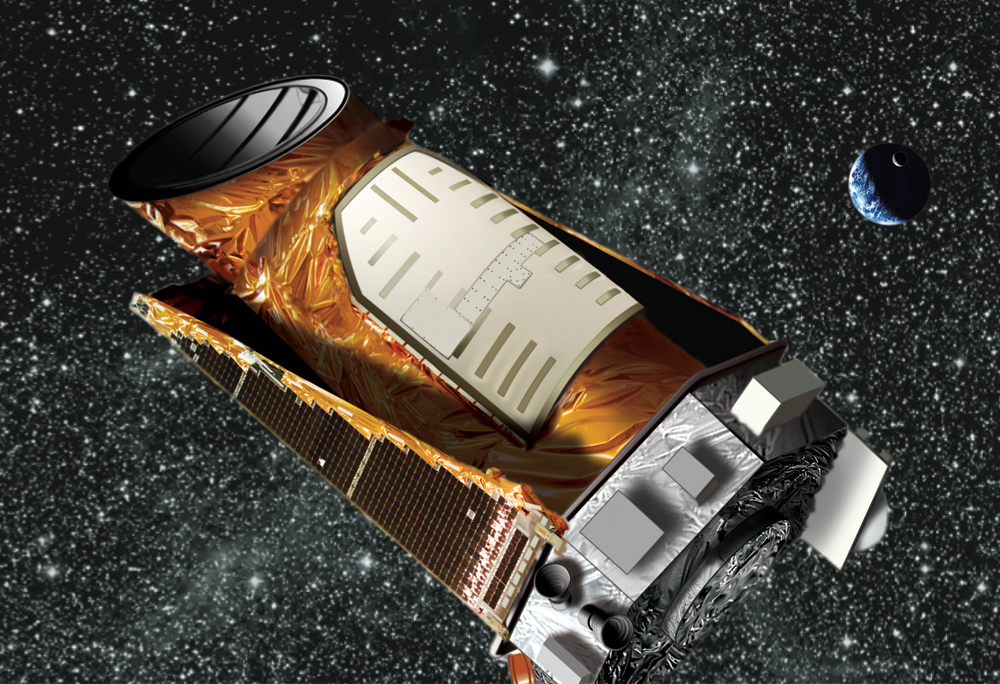
Kepler space telescope, artist's impression

26 proposals were submitted to the 2000 Discovery solicitation, with budget initially targeted at US$300 million. Three candidates were shortlisted in January 2001 for a phase-A design study: Dawn, Kepler space telescope, and INSIDE Jupiter. INSIDE Jupiter was similar to a later New Frontiers mission called Juno; Dawn was a mission to asteroids Vesta and Ceres, and Kepler was a space telescope mission aimed to discover extrasolar planets. The three finalists received US$450,000 to further mature the mission concept.

In December 2001, Kepler and Dawn were selected for flight. At this time, only 80 exoplanets had been detected, and the main mission of Kepler to look for more exoplanets, especially Earth-sized. Both Kepler and Dawn were initially projected for launch in 2006.

=== Discovery 11 ===
The original Announcement of Opportunity for a Discovery mission released on April 16, 2004. The only candidate for selection for a concept Phase A study was JASSI, which was a Jupiter flyby mission based on the New Frontiers Mission Juno that was already under consideration for final selection (eventually Juno was selected as the 2nd New Frontiers mission in 2005 and launched in 2011). No other discovery mission proposed in response to the Announcement of Opportunity was considered for concept study and therefore no Discovery mission was selected for this opportunity (although a mission of opportunity was selected (Moon Mineralogy Mapper) as part of the AO in 2004). The next Announcement of Opportunity for a Discovery mission was released on January 3, 2006. There were three finalists for this Discovery selection including GRAIL (the eventual winner), OSIRIS, and VESPER. OSIRIS was very similar to the later OSIRIS-REx mission, an asteroid sample-return mission to 101955 Bennu, and Vesper, a Venus orbiter mission. A previous proposal of Vesper had also been a finalist in the 1998 round of selection. The three finalists were announced in October 2006 and awarded US$1.2 million to further develop their proposals for the final round.

In November 2007 NASA selected the GRAIL mission as the next Discovery mission, with a goal of mapping lunar gravity and a 2011 launch. There were 23 other proposals that were also under consideration. The mission had a budget of US$375 million (then-year dollars) which included construction and launch.

=== Discovery 12 ===
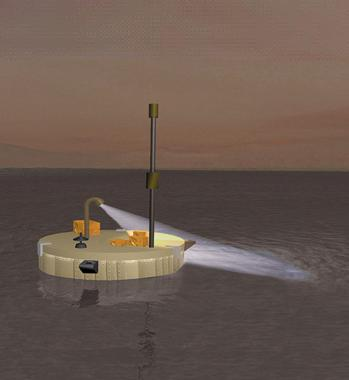
Artist's impression of proposed TiME lake lander for Saturn's moon Titan

The Announcement of Opportunity for a Discovery mission released on June 7, 2010. For this cycle, 28 proposals were received; 3 were for the Moon, 4 for Mars, 7 for Venus, 1 for Jupiter, 1 to a Jupiter Trojan, 2 to Saturn, 7 to asteroids, and 3 to comets. Out of the 28 proposals, three finalists received US$3 million in May 2011 to develop a detailed concept study:

- InSight, a Mars lander.
- Titan Mare Explorer (TiME), a lake lander for Saturn's moon Titan with methane-ethane lakes.
- Comet Hopper (CHopper) to study cometary evolution by landing on a comet multiple times and observing its changes as it interacts with the Sun.

In August 2012, InSight was selected for development and launch. The mission launched on May 5, 2018, and successfully landed on Mars on November 26.

=== Discovery 13 and 14 ===
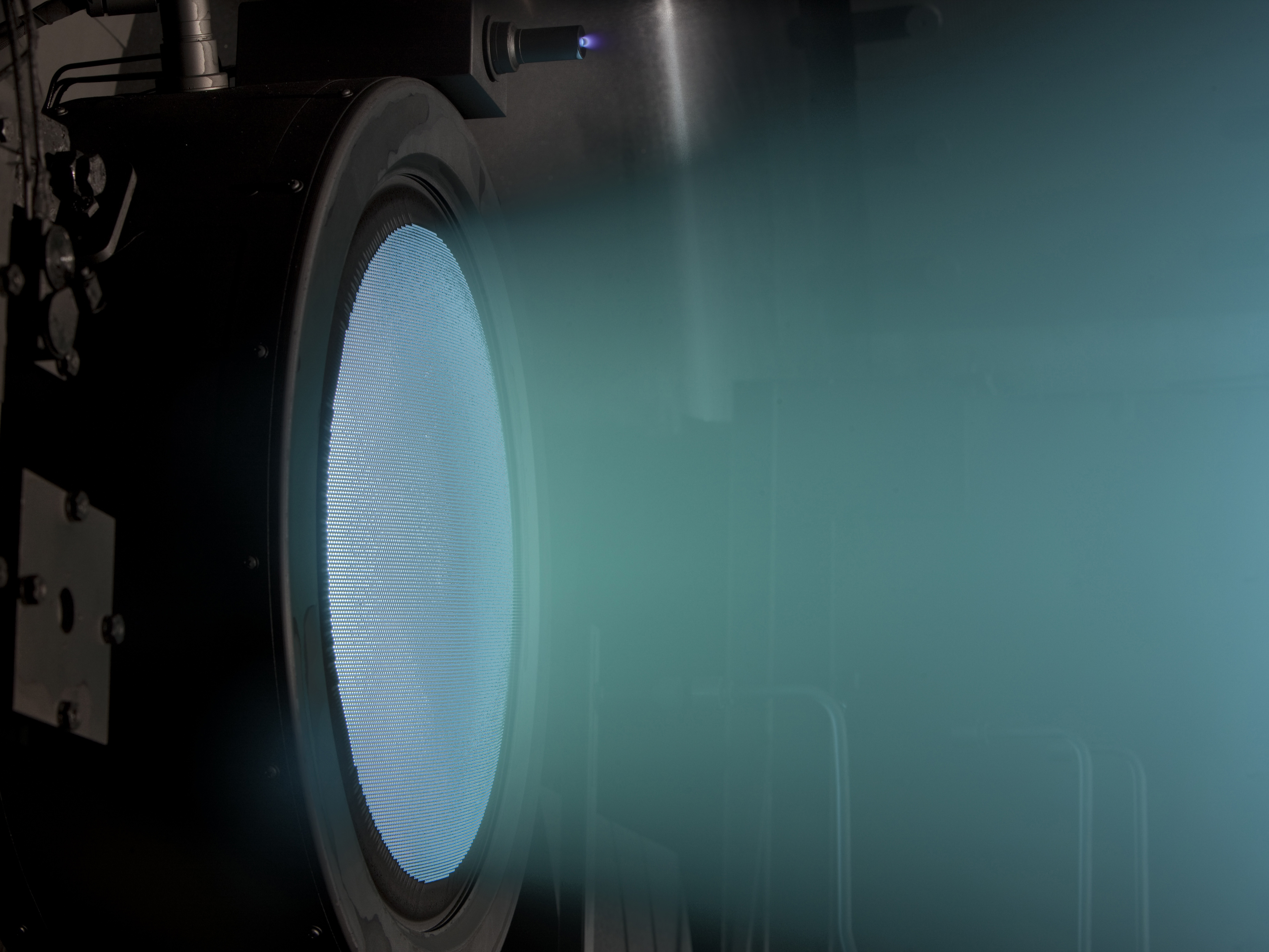
NASA made ion thruster technology available for proposals for the thirteenth Discovery Program mission.

In February 2014, NASA released a Discovery Program 'Draft Announcement of Opportunity' for launch readiness date of December 31, 2021. The final AO was released on November 5, 2014, and on September 30, 2015, NASA selected five mission concepts as finalists, each received $3 million for one-year of further study and concept refinement.

- Deep Atmosphere Venus Investigation of Noble gases, Chemistry, and Imaging (DAVINCI)
- Venus Emissivity, Radio Science, InSAR Topography and Spectroscopy (VERITAS)
- Near-Earth Object Camera (NEOCam)
- Lucy
- Psyche

On January 4, 2017, Lucy and Psyche were selected for the 13th and 14th Discovery missions, respectively and launched on 16 October 2021 and 13 October 2023, respectively. Lucy will fly by five Jupiter trojans, asteroids which share Jupiter's orbit around the Sun, orbiting either ahead of or behind the planet. Psyche will explore the origin of planetary cores by orbiting and studying the metallic asteroid 16 Psyche.

=== Discovery 15 and 16 ===
On December 22, 2018, NASA released a draft of its Discovery 2019 Announcement of Opportunity, which outlined its intent to select up to two missions with launch readiness dates of July 1, 2025 – December 31, 2026, and/or July 1, 2028 – December 31, 2029, as Discovery 15 and 16, respectively. The final Announcement of Opportunity was released on April 1, 2019, and proposal submissions were accepted between then and July 1, 2019.

Finalists, announced on February 13, 2020, were:

- DAVINCI (Deep Atmosphere Venus Investigation of Noble gases, Chemistry, and Imaging), a Venus atmospheric probe.
- Io Volcano Observer, an orbiter to Jupiter to perform at least nine flybys of Jupiter's volcanically active moon Io.
- Trident, a probe that would conduct a flyby of Neptune and its moon Triton.
- VERITAS (Venus Emissivity, Radio Science, InSAR, Topography, and Spectroscopy), a Venus orbiter to map the surface of Venus in high resolution.

On June 2, 2021, NASA administrator Bill Nelson announced in his "State of NASA" address that the two Venus missions, VERITAS and DAVINCI, had been selected for development. The two missions will launch between 2031 and 2032.

Other proposal submissions for Discovery 15 and 16 missions included:

Asteroids, comets, Centaurs, interplanetary dust

- Centaurus, a reconnaissance mission to explore multiple Centaurs via flybys as a way to learn about Solar System and planet formation.
- Chimera, a mission concept to orbit the highly active Centaur 29P/Schwassmann-Wachmann 1, to study the evolutionary middle ground between the Trans Neptunian Objects (TNOs) and Jupiter Family Comets.
- FOSSIL (Fragments from the Origins of the Solar System and our Interstellar Locale), a spacecraft to be placed in an Earth-trailing orbit to determine the composition of the local and interplanetary dust cloud.
- MANTIS (Main-belt Asteroid and NEO Tour with Imaging and Spectroscopy), a mission that would flyby 14 asteroids covering a wide range of types and masses.

Venus

- HOVER (Hyperspectral Observer for Venus Reconnaissance), a Venus orbiter that would perform spectral studies from the top of the atmosphere to the surface. Its main goal is understanding the mechanics of the Venus climate and atmospheric super-rotation.

Moon

- Moon Diver, a lunar lander which would deploy a rover to rappel down a deep pit, analyzing the exposed geological layers and investigate if the pit connects to a lava tube.
- Lunar Compass Rover, a rover designed to explore a nearside magnetic region and swirl, and would answer some questions in planetary science, including planetary magnetism, space plasma physics, space weathering, planetary geology, and the lunar water cycle. A proposal for Lunar Compass was not submitted to this Discovery round.
- ISOCHRON (Inner SOlar system CHRONology), a mission that would perform a robotic lunar sample-return of the youngest mare basalts.
- NanoSWARM, a lunar orbiter to investigate lunar swirls, space weathering, lunar water, lunar magnetism, and small-scale magnetospheres.

Mars

- COMPASS (Climate Orbiter for Mars Polar Atmospheric and Subsurface Science) is a mission concept for a Mars orbiter to research the Martian climate record through the study of its ice deposits and their interaction with current climate. This mission is led by the Lunar and Planetary Laboratory at the University of Arizona and the Laboratory for Atmospheric and Space Physics at the University of Colorado, Boulder.
- Icebreaker Life, a mission concept led by the Ames Research Center for a lander to search for direct signs of life on Mars via biomarker detection, with a focus on sampling ice-cemented ground for its potential to preserve and protect biomolecules or biosignatures.

Jupiter

- MAGIC (Magnetics, Altimetry, Gravity and Imaging of Callisto) is an orbiter reconnaissance concept to Jupiter's moon Callisto.

=== Discovery 17 and beyond ===
On August 24, 2023, NASA announced that due to budgetary constraints enacted through the Fiscal Responsibility Act of 2023, the official release of the Announcement of Opportunity for the fifth mission in the Discovery Program's "big sibling" program, New Frontiers, would be delayed to no earlier than 2026. In October 2023, Planetary Science Division Director Lori Glaze presented to the National Academies' Committee on Astrobiology and Planetary Science on the implications of these resource constraints, noting that there were unlikely to be solicitations for further Discovery missions until at least 2026 either.

== Gallery ==
=== Artists' impressions ===
Discovery Program
NEAR Shoemaker; 1996	Mars Pathfinder; 1996	Lunar Prospector; 1998	Stardust; 1999	Genesis; 2001	CONTOUR; 2002
MESSENGER; 2004	Deep Impact; 2005	Dawn; 2007	Kepler; 2009	GRAIL; 2011	InSight; 2018
Lucy; 2021	Psyche; 2023	DAVINCI; 2031–2032	VERITAS; 2031		

=== Mission insignias ===
This section includes an image of the Discovery missions' patches or logos, as well as the launch year.

Discovery Program
NEAR Shoemaker; 1996	Mars Pathfinder; 1996	Lunar Prospector; 1998	Stardust; 1999	Genesis; 2001	CONTOUR; 2002
MESSENGER; 2004	Deep Impact; 2005	Dawn; 2007	Kepler; 2009	GRAIL; 2011	InSight; 2018
Lucy; 2021	Psyche; 2023	DAVINCI; 2031–2032	VERITAS; 2031		

=== Launches ===
This section includes an image of the Discovery missions' rockets, as well as the launch year.

Discovery Program
NEAR Shoemaker; 1996	Mars Pathfinder; 1996	Lunar Prospector; 1998	Stardust; 1999	Genesis; 2001	CONTOUR; 2002
MESSENGER; 2004	Deep Impact; 2005	Dawn; 2007	Kepler; 2009	GRAIL; 2011	InSight; 2018
Lucy; 2021	Psyche; 2023				
