= MANTIS (spacecraft) =

MANTIS (Main-belt Asteroid and NEO Tour with Imaging and Spectroscopy)
- Mission type: Flyby of multiple asteroids
- Operator: NASA

Orbital parameters
- Reference system: Heliocentric

Flyby of multiple near Earth asteroids and main belt asteroids

MANTIS (Main-belt Asteroid and NEO Tour with Imaging and Spectroscopy) is a mission concept that would flyby 14 asteroids covering a wide range of types and masses, and obtaining remote sensing and in-situ data. This mission would explore the diversity of asteroids to understand the Solar system's history, its present processes, and hazards. The concept was proposed in 2019 to NASA's Discovery Program to compete for funding and development.

== Overview ==
The MANTIS mission was first proposed to NASA's Discovery program in 2015, and it would have flown by nine asteroids, but it was not selected at that time. The concept was reformulated and proposed again in 2019. The MANTIS mission would perform a flyby tour of near-Earth and Main belt asteroids as a means of observing several members of this population of objects, providing discovery science and also returning data that would be complementary and contextual to past, present, and future missions.

The spacecraft would visit 14 asteroids, and would focus on members of eight known collisional families of different spectral classes and in different parts of the asteroid belt. The largest of these is 50 Virginia, an 85-km asteroid. The current mission concept was formulated by a team composed of scientists from Johns Hopkins University Applied Physics Laboratory, NASA Goddard Space Flight Center, and the University of Colorado.

== Proposed payload ==
The proposed science payload includes four instruments:

- a narrow-angle camera similar to that on board the New Horizons, Double Asteroid Redirection Test (DART), and Lucy spacecraft
- Near-infrared imaging spectrometer similar to the CRISM instrument on board the Mars Reconnaissance Orbiter
- a mass spectrometer analyzing microsamples shed by asteroids and interplanetary dust particles encountered during cruise.
- a mid-infrared camera measuring thermal emission built by collaborators in the United Kingdom.
