= Chimera (spacecraft) =

Proposed spacecraft mission to orbit the active Centaur 29P/Schwassmann–Wachmann 1

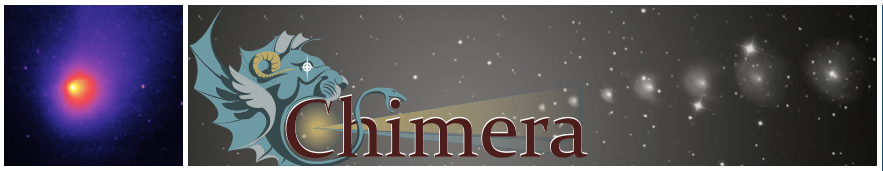
- A Gateway to the Centaurs and the Secrets of Small Body Formation
- Mission type: Centaur Orbiter
- Operator: NASA
- Mission duration: >2 years of orbital exploration

Spacecraft properties
- Manufacturer: Lockheed Martin

Start of mission
- Launch date: 2025–2026 (proposed)

Instruments
- Visible and Thermal Imagers, mass and infrared spectrometers, radar

Chimera is a NASA mission concept to orbit and explore 29P/Schwassmann–Wachmann (SW1), an active, outbursting small icy body in the outer Solar System. The concept was developed in response to the 2019 NASA call for potential missions in the Discovery-class, and it would have been the first spacecraft encounter with a Centaur and the first orbital exploration of a small body in the outer Solar System. The Chimera proposal was ranked in the first tier (Category 1) of submissions, but was not selected for further development for the programmatic reason of maintaining scientific balance.

SW1 is a member of the Centaur group, a population of near-pristine objects that have been gravitationally perturbed from the Kuiper Belt into unstable orbits in the region between Jupiter and Neptune. Many Centaurs eventually migrate into the inner Solar System to become short period, 'Jupiter Family' comets (JFCs), and SW1 is believed to occupy the orbital ‘gateway’ through which they pass as they make this transition. SW1’s characteristics are a chimeric combination of icy small bodies at different points along their evolution from the fringes of the Solar System to active comets passing near the Sun. This provides a unique opportunity to study how these objects formed, are composed, and change over time. Over a more than two year orbital encounter, Chimera would sample the escaping gas coma of SW1, study its patterns of activity and outburst, map the composition and topography of its surface, probe its interior, and monitor for changes as it evolves.

== Science ==
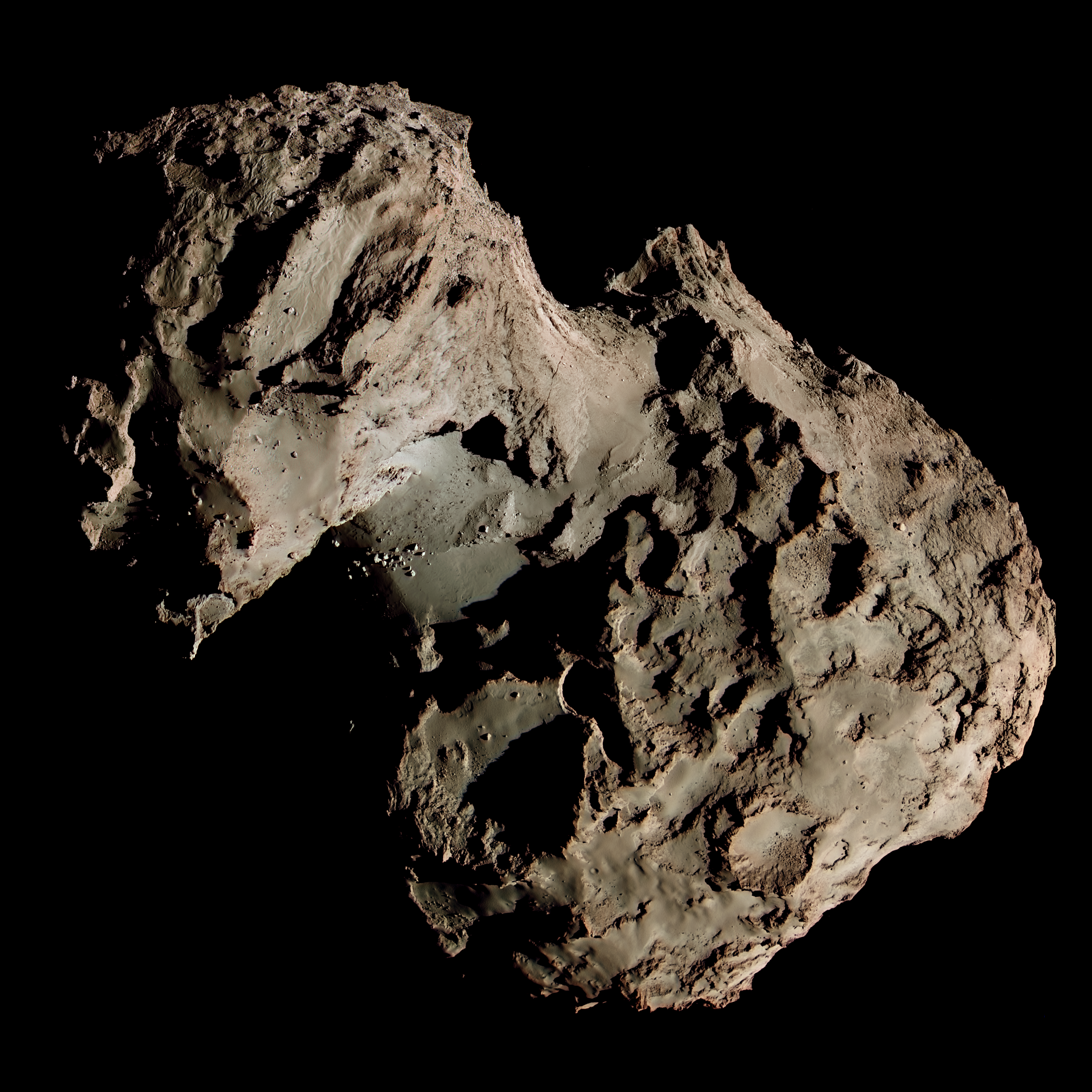
Jupiter Family Comet 67P/Churyumov–Gerasimenko as imaged by the Rosetta spacecraft.

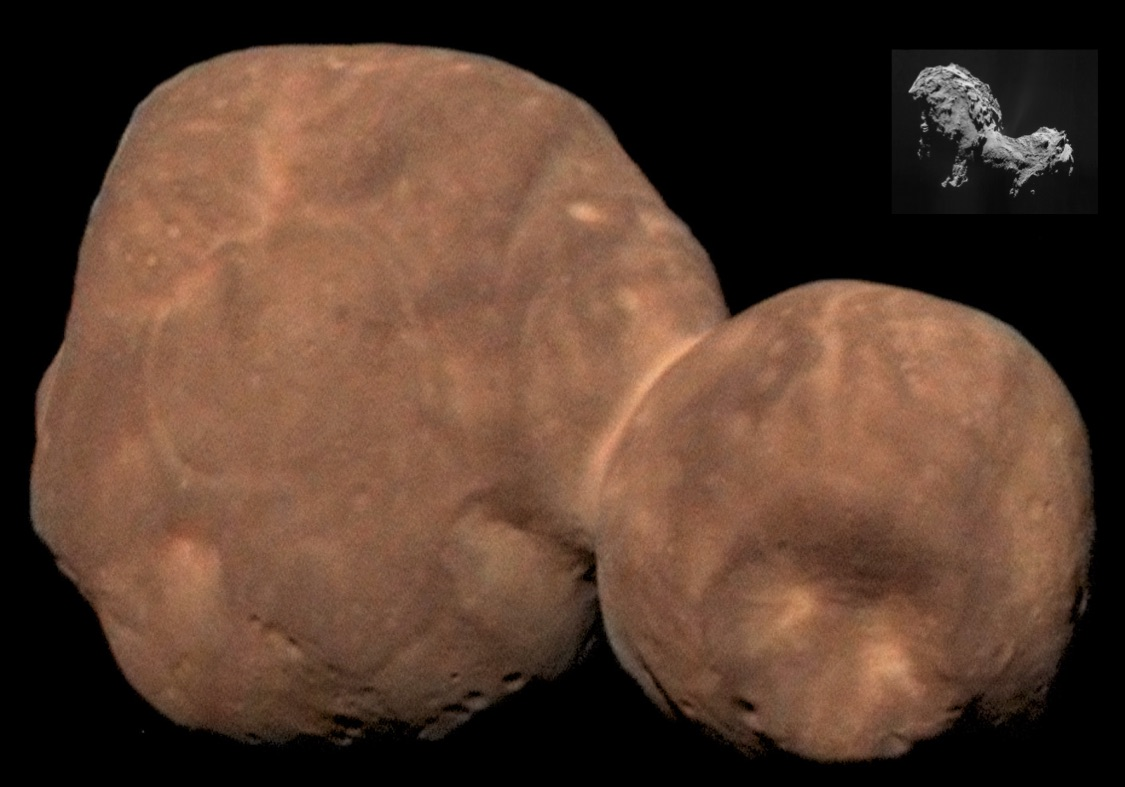
The Kuiper Belt Object 486958 Arrokoth (left), as imaged by New Horizons is compared with 67P/Churyumov–Gerasimenko (upper right: shown at relative size). The erosive effect of comet activity on 67P is evident in comparison with the relatively featureless surface of Arrokoth.

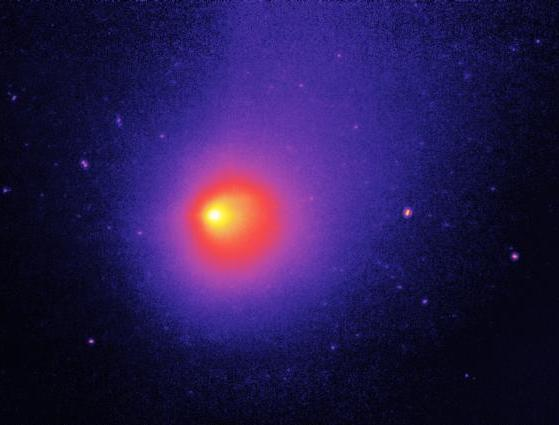
An image of 29P/Schwassmann–Wachmann taken with the Spitzer telescope shows the presence of its persistent dust coma.

Icy small bodies are primordial echoes of the formation of the Solar System, with physical properties derived from the planet forming disk and an orbit distribution related to early migration of the giant planets. Investigation of their composition (ice and gas), shape, and interior structure all provide insight into the process of planetary development. The modern population of icy small bodies includes unmodified objects in stable orbits in the remote outer Solar System (e.g. The Kuiper belt and Oort cloud) and more evolved objects that have migrated inward toward the Sun to become long period comets (e.g. C/1995 O1 (Hale–Bopp), short period comets (e.g. 67P/Churyumov–Gerasimenko) and the Centaurs.

The Centaurs are the least altered icy bodies orbiting interior to Neptune, with physical characteristics that are intermediate between the small icy bodies explored by previous (e.g. Rosetta, New Horizons), initiated (e.g. Lucy) and planned (e.g. Comet Interceptor) spacecraft missions. Their orbits are unstable and, on timescales 1-10 Myr, they are either scattered back into their Trans-Neptunian source region or inward toward Sun where they become comets. Centaurs are too far from the Sun for large-scale, water-based cometary behavior to occur, but they are close enough that some experience a form of sporadic activity. This early stage processing provides an opportunity to explore the transition of icy planetesimals from their primordial origins to their heavily-weathered cometary end-state.

Since its discovery during an outburst in 1927, the characteristics of 29P/Schwassmann–Wachmann have identified it as enigmatic compared to other known comets and a candidate for detailed study.

- SW1 is the most active small body in the outer Solar System and the only Centaur known to be continuously active.
- SW1 has a century-long history of experiencing major (2–5 Visual Magnitude) outburst events that can expel ≥10^{9} kg of dust, gas, and ice. Modern studies show an outburst rate of ~7 per year, making it the only known object where the opportunity for in situ study of these highly energetic events is guaranteed as part of a long duration spacecraft encounter.
- SW1 orbits inside a dynamical 'gateway' through which a majority of future JFCs pass. Forward modeling gives SW1 a 75% chance of becoming a JFC within the next 4000 years.

The physical characteristics of SW1 and its orbit simultaneously connect it to icy planetesimals in multiple evolutionary states. Its study provides insight into their distinctive histories.

- SW1's orbital evolution is linked to both the KBOs (Kuiper Belt Objects) and JFCs.
- SW1's activity patterns mirror those of LPCs in the giant planet region.
- SW1 is experiencing physical processing common to embryonic JFCs.
- SW1's thermal environment is similar to that of the Jupiter Trojans during a possible early active period.

== Accessibility and environment ==
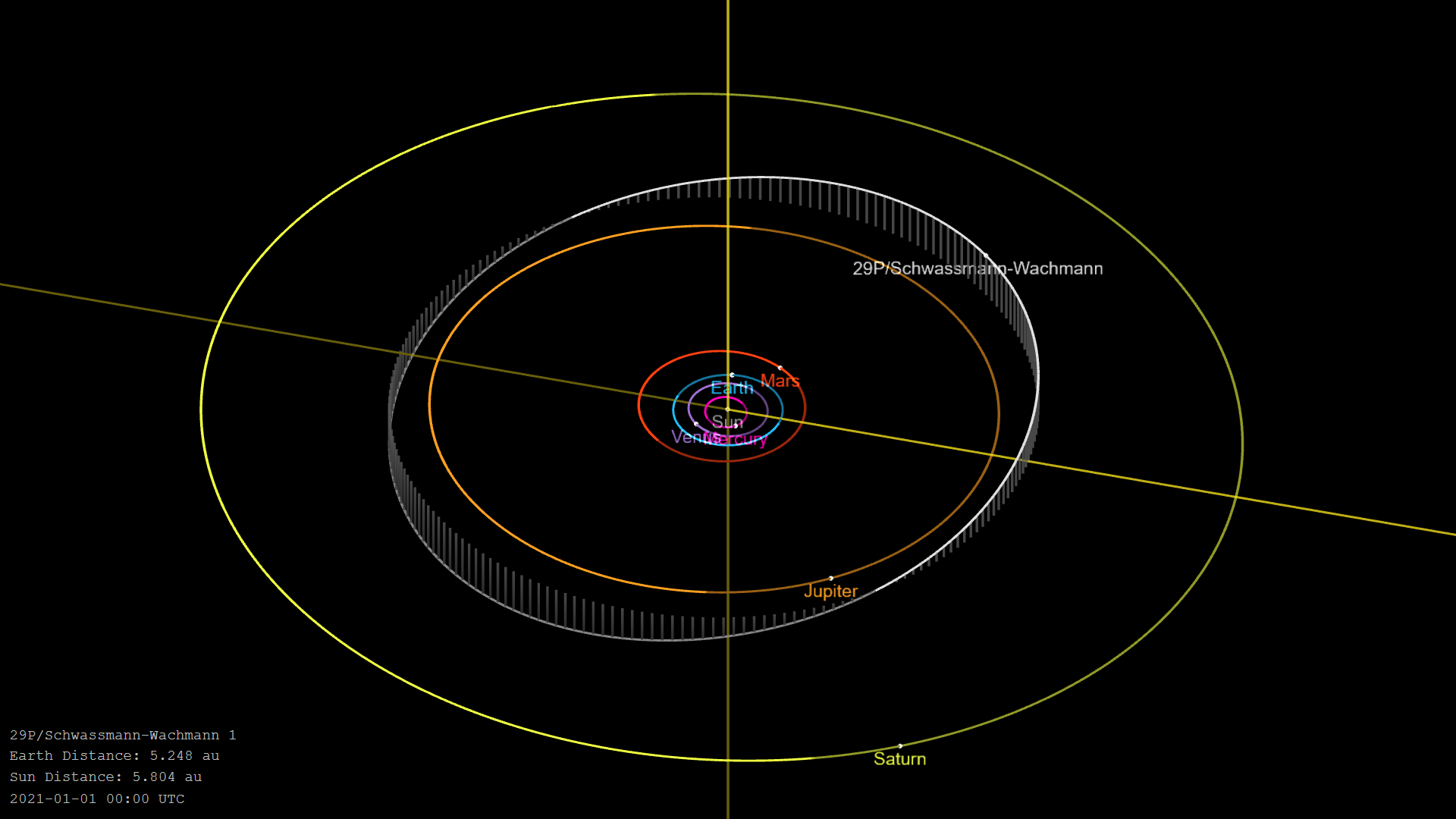
An orbital diagram of 29P/Schwassmann–Wachmann

SW1's orbit has the smallest semi-major axis (5.986 au) of the large Centaurs, a very low eccentricity (e=0.044), and a modest inclination (9.39°). These factors combine with its proximity to Jupiter to make it uniquely accessible for an orbital rendezvous within the resources of the Discovery mission class. Similar to other Centaurs with surrounding rings and shrouds of debris (e.g. 10199 Chariklo, 2060 Chiron), SW1's nucleus is obscured by an extensive dust coma that is constantly replenished by a combination of continuous activity and large outbursts. While the presence of larger coma grains around these objects could pose a hazard during high relative velocity encounters, their environments are benign for spacecraft on much slower orbital trajectories. SW1 has an estimated diameter of 60.4 ± 7.4 km that is larger than any known JFC and comparable in both size and activity to the well-known long period comet Hale–Bopp. Its rotation rate less well-constrained, with several studies obtaining periods ranging from several days to as long as 2 months.

== Mission design ==
The prime launch windows for Chimera are in 2025 and 2026. The spacecraft trajectory exploits a rare planetary configuration that does not repeat until the 2080's. A series of gravity assist maneuvers are used to position Chimera at SW1 with a relative velocity low enough to permit orbital insertion. Several planetary and small body encounter options are possible during the cruise phase to enhance scientific return. Chimera will be the first orbital exploration of an outer Solar System small body and the third orbital spacecraft mission (after Cassini-Huygens and the upcoming Dragonfly) to operate beyond Jupiter. It will also be the most distant spacecraft mission to utilize solar power.

The encounter phase of the mission begins with the deceleration of the spacecraft beyond the Hill sphere of SW1. This is followed by a slow approach at a relative velocity of <10 m/s, during which the nucleus properties, activity patterns, outburst behavior, and debris environment are characterized. Following orbit insertion, Chimera begins detailed study of the surface topography, ice distribution, and thermal characteristics, the distribution and magnitude of activity and outbursts, the interior structure of the nucleus, and the in situ composition of the gas coma. Over the subsequent ~2 years, the spacecraft orbit will progress toward lower altitudes to perform intensive study of regions of interest, monitor for physical evolution, obtain more precise internal measurements, and to sample the near subsurface.

== Scientific payload ==
The Chimera exploration objectives are achieved using a combination of measurements including

- High-Resolution Imaging of surface features and surrounding dust at visible wavelengths,
- Spectroscopy of the surface, dust, and gas coma composition in the near infrared,
- In Situ Mass Spectroscopy of elemental, molecular, and plasma composition of the gas coma,
- Gravity Science using Doppler shifts in the spacecraft transmitter frequency to measure the internal mass distribution of the nucleus,
- Wide-Field Monitoring for outburst events and orbiting debris,
- Thermal Imaging of temperatures on the surface and in the dust coma,
- Radar measurements of the near-subsurface structure and composition.

== Development team ==
The Chimera mission concept is a joint development of the Lunar and Planetary Laboratory at the University of Arizona, Goddard Space Flight Center, and Lockheed Martin.
