= ISOCHRON (spacecraft) =

Lunar sample return mission proposal

- Names: Inner SOlar system CHRONogy
- Mission type: Lunar sample-return
- Operator: NASA

Start of mission
- Launch date: 2025 (proposed)

Moon lander
- Landing site: South of Aristarchus plateau
- Sample mass: 150 g (5.3 oz)

ISOCHRON (Inner SOlar system CHRONogy) is a proposed lunar sample-return mission that would retrieve samples of the youngest lunar mare basalt.

This robotic mission was proposed in July 2019 to NASA's Discovery Program. It was not shortlisted.

== Overview ==
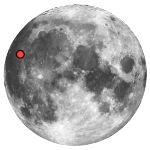
Location of the Aristarchus crater and Aristarchus plateau on the Moon.

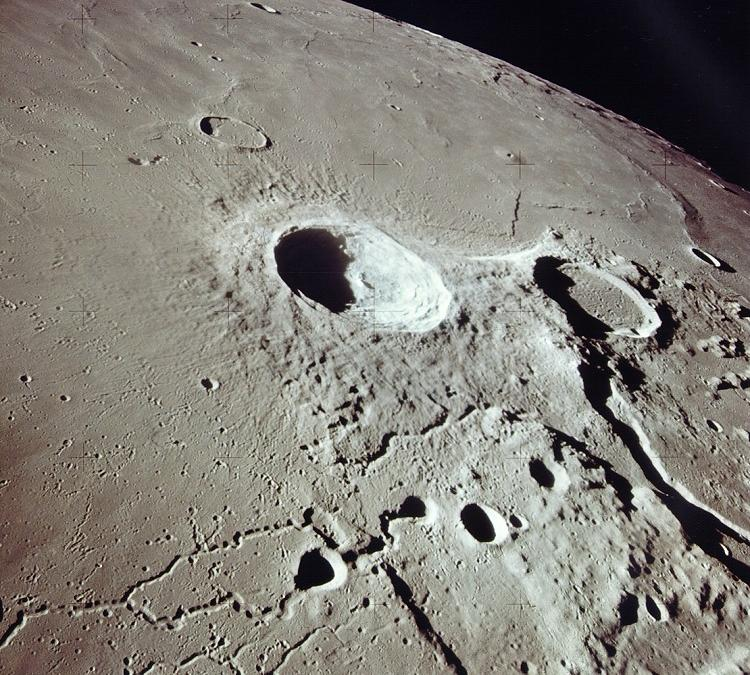
Aristarchus (center) and Herodotus (right) from Apollo 15.

ISOCHRON would address fundamental questions about the composition of the lunar crust and the time-stratigraphy of lunar volcanic processes, with implications for all of the terrestrial planets. There is a stretch of nearly 2 billion years of lunar history that planetary scientists have not been able to date because the Apollo missions did not retrieve any young rocks. Lunar mare basalts formed through partial melting of the mantle, thus serve as probes of the structure and composition of the interior. The stated scientific objective of the mission is: "[To] make high-precision radiometric age measurements on these relatively young basalts to fill the existing gap in age-correlated crater size-frequency distributions (CSFDs), thereby greatly improving this widely-used tool for estimating the ages of exposed surfaces on rocky bodies."

The proposed ISOCHRON mission concept would have a robotic lander land just south of Aristarchus plateau and retrieve about 150 g (5.3 oz) of a basalt sample estimated to be 1.5 to 2.0 billion years old. The sample would be placed in a small container, launched to Earth, and it would be curated at NASA's Lunar Sample Laboratory Facility.

The Principal Investigator is Dave Draper, at NASA's Johnson Space Center in Texas.

== Location ==
The sample would be obtained from the Aristarchus plateau, located in the midst of the Oceanus Procellarum, a large expanse of lunar mare. This is a tilted crustal block, about 200 km across, that rises to a maximum elevation of 2 km above the mare in the southeastern section.

== See also ==
- Geology of the Moon
- Internal structure of the Moon
- Relative dating
