= Edward J. Weiler =

American planetary scientist

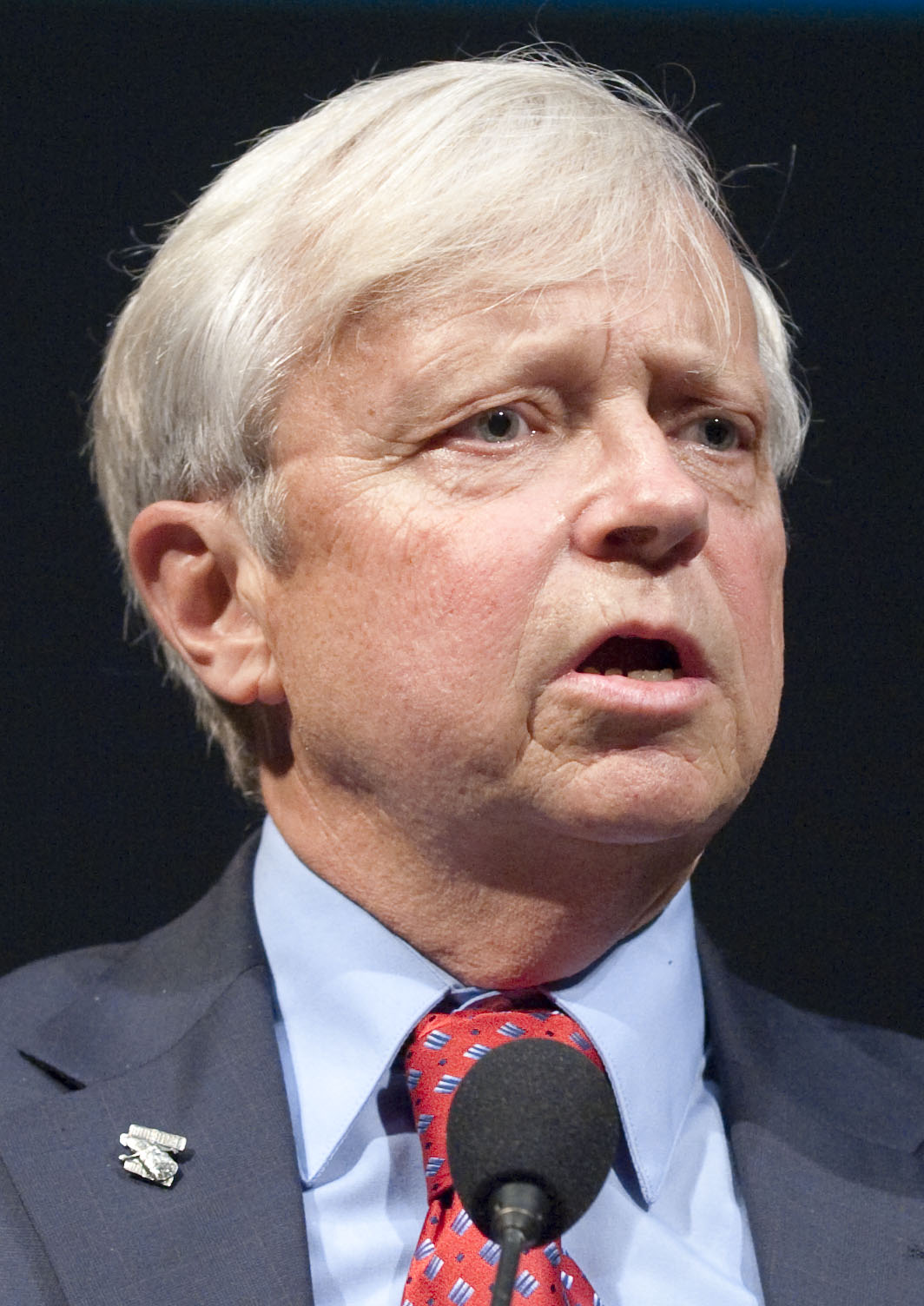
Edward J. Weiler in 2009

Edward J. Weiler (born 1949) was the Associate Administrator for the Science Mission Directorate of the National Aeronautics and Space Administration until his retirement on September 30, 2011.

== Career ==
Edward J. Weiler received his PhD in astrophysics from Northwestern University in 1976. Prior to joining NASA, Weiler was a member of the Princeton University research staff. He joined Princeton in 1976 and was based at the Goddard Space Flight Center as the director of science operations of the Orbiting Astronomical Observatory-3 (COPERNICUS).

Weiler was hired by Nancy Grace Roman as a staff scientist at NASA Headquarters in 1978 and was promoted to the Chief of the Ultraviolet/Visible and Gravitational Astrophysics Division in 1979. He also served as the Chief Scientist for the Hubble Space Telescope from 1979 until 1998. Before his 1998 appointment as Associate Administrator, he served as the Director of the Astronomical Search for Origins Program at NASA Headquarters in Washington, D.C. He had served as the Associate Administrator for NASA's Space Science Enterprise from 1998 to 2004.

In 2000, Weiler oversaw both the cancellation of a decade-long-considered mission last called the Pluto Kuiper Express and the initiation of a low-cost Pluto mission similar in structure to the Near Earth Asteroid Rendezvous in November of the year. The latter Pluto mission had a launch target window in 2006 and a $500 million budget originally; it ultimately developed successfully into the New Horizons craft to fly by and study Pluto and its moons and, if possible, multiple Kuiper Belt objectives beyond.

Weiler took over leadership of the Goddard Space Flight Center as its 10th Center Director on August 1, 2004. He was named Associate Administrator of the Science Mission Directorate on May 7, 2008, by Administrator Michael D. Griffin. He had been appointed as interim chief of the directorate on March 26 from his position of Center Director of Goddard Space Flight Center.

== See also ==
- List of New Horizons topics
