= Lunar Discovery and Exploration Program =

The Lunar Discovery and Exploration Program (LDEP) is a program within NASA's Science Mission Directorate.

The program was established as part of NASA's FY2019 budget, assuming responsibility for the Lunar Reconnaissance Orbiter, along with the Commercial Lunar Payload Services initiative developing the VIPER rover and Lunar Trailblazer orbiter.
