= Scott Hensley =

American electrical engineer

Scott Hensley is an engineer at the Jet Propulsion Laboratory in Pasadena, California. He was named a Fellow of the Institute of Electrical and Electronics Engineers (IEEE) in 2014 for his contributions to radar remote sensing of the Earth and planetary bodies, and advancements in interferometric synthetic-aperture radar.
