= MESUR =

NASA program designed to explore Mars

MESUR (Mars Environmental SURvey) was a NASA program designed to explore Mars in preparation for human follow-up missions of the Space Exploration Initiative. The only mission of the program that was completed was MESUR Pathfinder.

== History ==
MESUR was a planned set of 16 surface missions on Mars that would also set up a planetary network across Mars and work in conjunction with Mars Observer. The original plan was proposed by NASA Ames, but it would eventually include ideas from the competing JPL proposal. It was envisioned as a low-cost method of surveying Mars, with risk tolerance, since a loss of a spacecraft was not fatal to the program, because of multiple relatively cheap space probes.

MESUR Pathfinder would be the "pathfinder" mission for the MESUR program. MESUR regular missions would start landing in 1999. The multi-year MESUR would have 16 more landers, landing in the projected period of 1999-2003, and lasting 10 years. Launches would start in 1996. Several of the landers would carry Sojourner-class rovers. The entire program was projected at a cost of $1 billion US, with per annum spending restricted to $150 million US, starting in FY1994. They were planned to be low-cost missions to Mars, instead of multibillion-dollar missions.

The rovers and landers would have instruments and cameras to examine surface rocks, search for water, perform seismography, and observe meteorology. The seismology experiments would help determine the internal structure of Mars.

After Pathfinder, in 1999, four landers would be launched in a single rocket. At the next launch window in 2001, four more landers would again launch in on a single rocket. Finally in 2003, the last eight landers would launch on two rockets.

On 26 June 1992, NASA unveiled the prototype for Mars Sojourner, Rocky IV, on the 25th anniversary of the first US lunar lander.

After the loss of Mars Observer, the MESUR program was shelved, and Pathfinder became part of the NASA Discovery Program.

== Missions ==
=== MESUR Pathfinder ===
The MESUR Pathfinder was launched on December 4, 1996 by NASA aboard a Delta II. After a 7-month voyage it landed on Ares Vallis, in a region called Chryse Planitia on Mars, on 4 July 1997. During its voyage the spacecraft had to accomplish four flight adjustments on 10 January, 3 February, 6 May and 25 June. The lander opened, exposing the rover called Sojourner that would go on to execute many experiments on the Martian surface.

Although the mission was programmed to last a week to a month, it eventually lasted for almost three months. The final contact with the Pathfinder was at 10:23 UTC on September 27, 1997. Although the mission planners tried to restore contact during the following five months, the successful mission was terminated on March 10, 1998. After the landing, the Mars Pathfinder was renamed the Sagan Memorial Station in honor of the famous astronomer and planetologist Carl Sagan. The mission had exceeded its goals in the first month.
