= Venera-17 =

Proposed Russian mission to Venus

Venera 17
- Artist's concept of the Venera-D spacecraft approaching a cloud-veiled Venus
- Names: Venera-D
- Mission type: Venus orbiter/lander
- Operator: Roscosmos
- Mission duration: Orbiter: ≥3 years Lander: >3 hours LLISSE surface probe: ≈90 Earth days

Spacecraft properties
- Manufacturer: NPO Lavochkin
- Launch mass: 4,800 kg (10,600 lb)
- Dry mass: Orbiter: 990 kg (2,180 lb); Lander: 1,600 kg (3,500 lb)
- Payload mass: Orbiter: 1,200 kg (2,600 lb); Lander: 85 kg (187 lb)
- Power: Orbiter: 1,700 W

Start of mission
- Launch date: Proposed: 2036
- Rocket: Angara A5
- Launch site: Vostochniy Site 1A

Orbital parameters
- Reference system: Cytherocentric
- Regime: Polar
- Pericytherion altitude: 300 km (190 mi)
- Apocytherion altitude: 500 km (310 mi)
- Inclination: 90°
- Period: 24 hours

Venus orbiter
- Spacecraft component: Orbiter

Venus lander
- Spacecraft component: Lander

Venus Aerial
- Spacecraft component: Balloon

Transponders
- Band: X band, K_{a} band
- Capacity: 16 Mbit/sec

Venera-17 or Venera-D (Russian: Венера-Д, pronounced [vʲɪˈnʲɛrə ˈdɛ]) is a proposed Russian space mission to Venus that would include an orbiter and a lander to be launched in 2036. The orbiter's prime objective is to perform observations with the use of a radar. The lander, based on the Venera design, would be capable of operating for a long duration (≈3 h) on the planet's surface. The "D" in Venera-D stands for "долгоживущая" ("dolgozhivuschaya"), which means "long lasting" in Russian.

Venera-D will be the first Venus probe launched by the Russian Federation (the earlier Venera probes were launched by the former Soviet Union). Venera-D will serve as the flagship for a new generation of Russian-built Venus probes, culminating with a lander capable of withstanding the harsh Venusian environment for more than the 1 1/2 hours logged by the Soviet probes. The atmosphere of Venus experiences average temperatures of 462 °C (864 °F), crushing 90 bar (89 atm; 1,300 psi) pressures, and corroding clouds of carbon dioxide laced with sulfuric acid. Venera-D will be launched on an Angara A5 rocket.

== History ==
In 2003, Venera-D was proposed to the Russian Academy of Sciences for its "wish list" of science projects to be included into the Federal Space Program in 2006–2015. During the formulation of the mission concept in 2004, the launch of Venera-D was expected in 2013 and its landing on the surface of Venus in 2014. In its original conception, it had a large orbiter, a sub-satellite, two balloons, two small landers, and a large long-lived lander (≈3 h).

By 2011, the mission had been pushed back to 2018, and scaled back to an orbiter with a subsatellite orbiter, and a single lander with an expected 3-hour operation time. By the beginning of 2011, the Venera-D project entered Phase A (Preliminary Design) stage of development.

Following the loss of the Phobos-Grunt spacecraft in November 2011 and resulting delays in all Russian planetary projects (with the exception of ExoMars, a joint effort with the European Space Agency), the implementation of the project was again delayed to no earlier than 2026.

=== Status ===
Lavochkin Association are leading the effort in the development of the mission concept architecture. From 2018 to 2020, the second phase of the science activities between NASA and the Russian Space Research Institute (IKI) continued to refine the science concepts, the orbiter and lander mission architecture, as well as a detailed examination of the types of aerial platforms that could address key Venus science in situ. Additional workshops were held as the mission concept develops. From the standpoint of total mass delivered to Venus, the best launch opportunities will occur in 2029 and 2031.

As of 2025, Venera-D is planned for launch no earlier than 2036.

== Goals ==
The mission has an emphasis on the atmospheric superrotation, the geological processes that have formed and modified the surface, the mineralogical and elemental composition of surface materials, and the chemical processes related to the interaction of the surface and the atmosphere. The orbiter's goals are as follows:

- Study of the dynamics and nature of superrotation, radiative balance, and the nature of the greenhouse effect
- Characterize the thermal structure of the atmosphere, winds, thermal tides, and solar locked structures
- Measure the composition of the atmosphere, study the clouds, their structure, composition, microphysics, and chemistry
- Investigate the upper atmosphere, ionosphere, electrical activity, magnetosphere, and the gas escape rate

The lander has its own goals, which are the following:

- Perform chemical analysis of surface materials and study the elemental composition of the surface, including radiogenic elements
- Study of interaction between the surface and the atmosphere
- Investigate the structure and chemical composition of the atmosphere down to the surface, including the abundances and isotopic ratios of the trace and noble gases
- Perform direct chemical analysis of the cloud aerosols
- Characterize the geology of local landforms at different scales

== Notional science instruments ==
To achieve the mission's science goals, the team is assessing the following instruments for the orbiter:

- PFS-VD Fourier transform spectrometer, 250–2000 cm-1 λ=5-45 μm, Δν = 1 cm-1
- UV mapping spectrometer, 190–490 nm, Δʎ=0.3 nm
- MM-radiometer, Millimeter Wave Radiometer; Ka, V and W bands
- UV-IR Imaging Spectrometer, VENIS
- Monitoring camera
- Solar and star occultation spectrometer, SSOE
- Infrared heterodyne spectrometer, IVOLGA
- Radio-science 1 Orbiter to ground, two-frequency occultation in S- and X-bands
- Radio-science 2 Ground to orbiter two-frequency occultation in S- and X-bands
- GROZA-SAS2-DFM-D, Electromagnetic waves generated by lightning and other electric phenomena
- Suite of 3 plasma instruments: 1) Panoramic energy mass-analyzer of ions; 2) CAMERA-O, electron spectrometer ELSPEC, fast neutrals analyzer FNA; 3) Energetic particle spectrometer.

Lander instruments

The lander will carry about 85 kg of instruments, that may include:

- Mossbauer Spectrometer / APXS
- Chemical analyses package (CAP): Gas Chromatograph & Mass Spectrometer
- Meteorological suite
- Sample acquisition, handling, processing

== Potential NASA collaboration ==
In 2014, Russian scientists asked NASA if the U.S. space agency would be interested in collaborating some instruments to the mission. Under this potential collaboration, the study team "Venera-D Joint Science Definition Team" (JSDT) was established in 2015. Venera-D could incorporate some US components, including balloons, a subsatellite for plasma measurements, or a long-lived (90-day) surface station on the lander. Any potential collaboration is still under discussion.

Potential science instruments NASA could contribute include a Raman spectrometer and an Alpha-Proton X-Ray Spectrometer (APXS). Also, the three types of atmospheric maneuverable platforms under consideration by NASA include super pressure balloons, altitude controlled balloons, the Venus Atmospheric Maneuverable Platform (VAMP) semi-buoyant aircraft, and solar powered aircraft.

The solar-powered Venus Atmosphere Mobile Platform (VAMP) is currently under development by the Northrop-Grumman Corp. If included, it would be capable of flying within the cloud layer between 50 and 62 km, and is being developed to operate over the 117 Earth days needed for complete monitoring over one full Venus day. It would carry instruments to acquire observations of the atmospheric structure, circulation, radiation, composition and trace gas species, along with cloud aerosols and the unknown ultraviolet absorber(s).

Another proposed payload is LLISSE (Long Lived In-situ Solar System Explorer), which uses new materials and heat-resistant electronics that would enable independent operation for about 90 Earth days. This endurance may allow to obtain periodic measurements of weather data to update global circulation models and quantify near surface atmospheric chemistry variability. Its anticipated instruments include wind speed/direction sensors, temperature sensors, pressure sensors, and a chemical multi-sensor array. LLISSE is a small 20 cm (7.9 in) cube of about 10 kg (22 lb). The lander may carry two LLISSE units; one would be battery-powered (3,000 h), and the other would be wind-powered.

As a result of US sanctions imposed as a result of the 2022 Russian invasion of Ukraine, Roscosmos Director-General Dmitry Rogozin announced that any continued participation between Russia and the United States on Venera-D was inappropriate.

== See also ==
- Observations and explorations of Venus
- List of missions to Venus
  - VERITAS, NASA orbiter
  - DAVINCI+, NASA orbiter and atmospheric probe
  - EnVision, ESA orbiter
