= Observations and explorations of Venus =

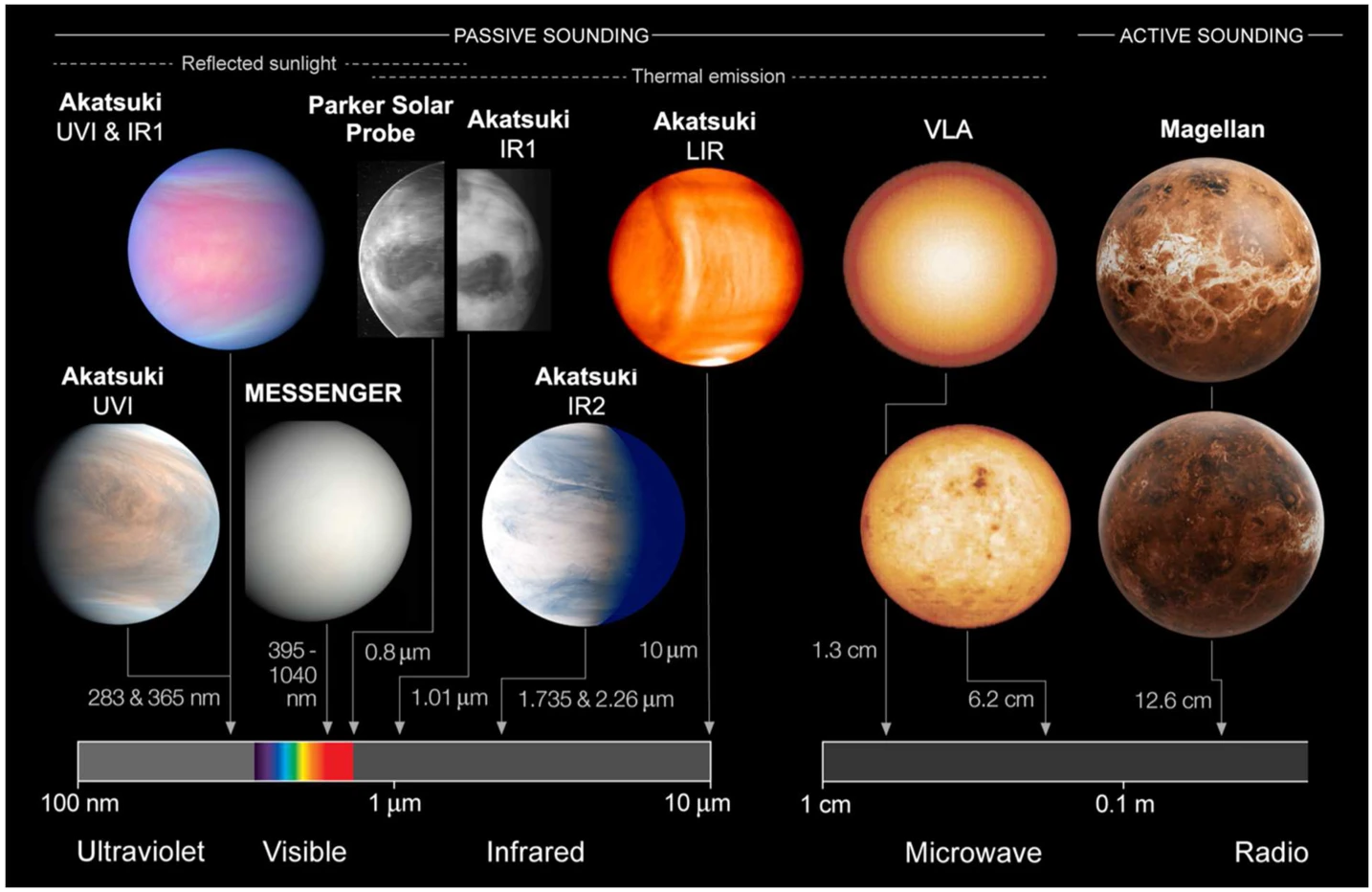
Venus imaged in different wavelengths by spacecraft.

The planet Venus was first observed in antiquity, and continued with telescopic observations, and then by visiting spacecraft. Spacecraft have performed multiple flybys, orbits, and landings on the planet, including balloon probes that floated in its atmosphere. Study of the planet is aided by its relatively close proximity to the Earth, but the surface of Venus is obscured by an atmosphere opaque to visible light.

== Ground-based observations ==
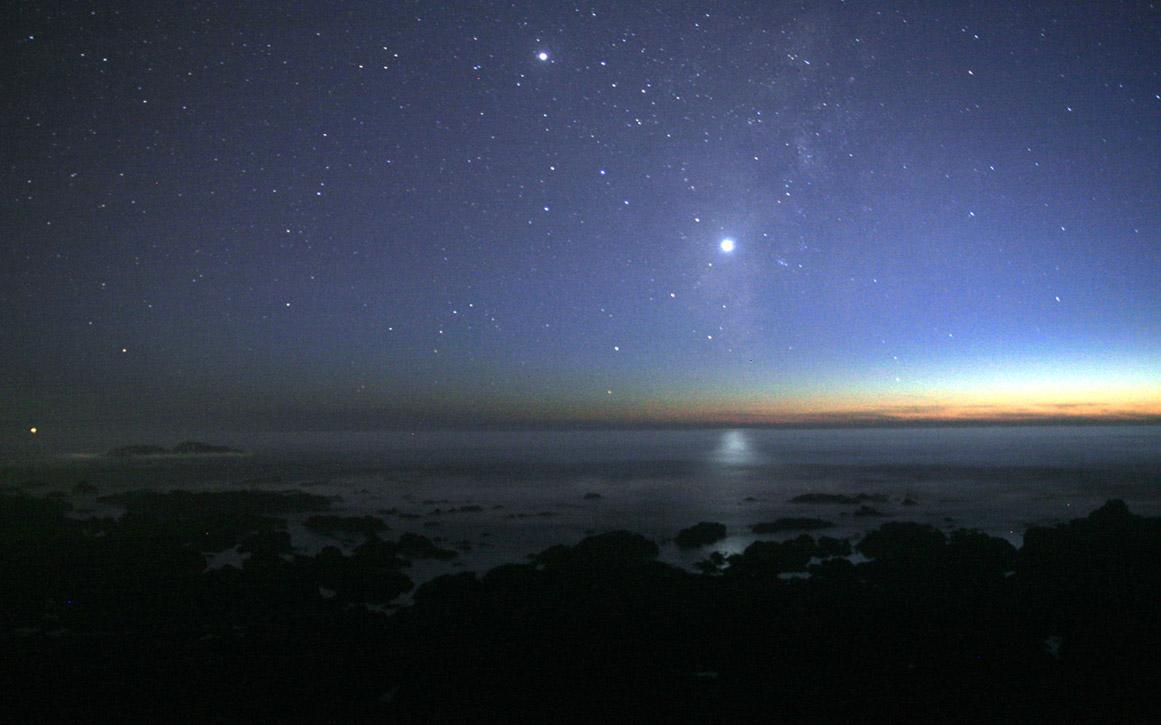
Venus is always brighter than the brightest stars outside the Solar System, as can be seen here over the Pacific Ocean

Transits of Venus directly between the Earth and the Sun's visible disc are rare astronomical events. The first such transit to be predicted and observed was the 1639 transit of Venus, seen and recorded by English astronomers Jeremiah Horrocks and William Crabtree. The observation by Mikhail Lomonosov of the transit of 1761 provided the first evidence that Venus had an atmosphere, and the 19th-century observations of parallax during Venus transits allowed the distance between the Earth and Sun to be accurately calculated for the first time. Transits can only occur either in early June or early December, these being the points at which Venus crosses the ecliptic (the orbital plane of the Earth), and occur in pairs at eight-year intervals, with each such pair more than a century apart. The most recent pair of transits of Venus occurred in 2004 and 2012, while the prior pair occurred in 1874 and 1882.

In the 19th century, many observers stated that Venus had a period of rotation of roughly 24 hours. Italian astronomer Giovanni Schiaparelli was the first to predict a significantly slower rotation, proposing that Venus was tidally locked with the Sun (as he had also proposed for Mercury). While not actually true for either body, this was still a reasonably accurate estimate. The near-resonance between its rotation and its closest approach to Earth helped to create this impression, as Venus always seemed to be facing the same direction when it was in the best location for observations to be made. The rotation rate of Venus was first measured during the 1961 conjunction, observed by radar from a 26 m antenna at Goldstone, California, the Jodrell Bank Radio Observatory in the UK, and the Soviet deep space facility in Yevpatoria, Crimea. Accuracy was refined at each subsequent conjunction, primarily from measurements made from Goldstone and Eupatoria. The fact that rotation was retrograde was not confirmed until 1964.

Before radio observations in the 1960s, many believed that Venus contained a lush, Earth-like environment. This was due to the planet's size and orbital radius, which suggested a fairly Earth-like situation as well as to the thick layer of clouds which prevented the surface from being seen. Among the speculations on Venus were that it had a jungle-like environment or that it had oceans of either petroleum or carbonated water. However, microwave observations by C. Mayer et al. indicated a high-temperature source (600 K). Strangely, millimetre-band observations made by A. D. Kuzmin indicated much lower temperatures. Two competing theories explained the unusual radio spectrum, one suggesting the high temperatures originated in the ionosphere, and another suggesting a hot planetary surface.

In September 2020, a team at Cardiff University announced that observations of Venus using the James Clerk Maxwell Telescope and Atacama Large Millimeter Array in 2017 and 2019 indicated that the Venusian atmosphere contained phosphine (PH_{3}) in concentrations 10,000 times higher than those that could be ascribed to any known non-biological source on Venus. The phosphine was detected at heights of at least 30 miles (48 kilometres) above the surface of Venus, and was detected primarily at mid-latitudes with none detected at the poles of Venus. This could have indicated the potential presence of biological organisms on Venus, however, this measurement was later shown to be in error.

== Terrestrial radar mapping ==
After the Moon, Venus was the second object in the Solar System to be explored by radar from the Earth. The first studies were carried out in 1961 at NASA's Goldstone Observatory, part of the Deep Space Network. At successive inferior conjunctions, Venus was observed both by Goldstone and the National Astronomy and Ionosphere Center in Arecibo. The studies carried out were similar to the earlier measurement of transits of the meridian, which had revealed in 1963 that the rotation of Venus was retrograde (it rotates in the opposite direction to that in which it orbits the Sun). The radar observations also allowed astronomers to determine that the rotation period of Venus was 243.1 days, and that its axis of rotation was almost perpendicular to its orbital plane. It was also established that the radius of the planet was 6,052 kilometres (3,761 mi), some 70 kilometres (43 mi) less than the best previous figure obtained with terrestrial telescopes.

Interest in the geological characteristics of Venus was stimulated by the refinement of imaging techniques between 1970 and 1985. Early radar observations suggested merely that the surface of Venus was more compacted than the dusty surface of the Moon. The first radar images taken from the Earth showed very bright (radar-reflective) highlands christened Alpha Regio, Beta Regio, and Maxwell Montes; improvements in radar techniques later achieved an image resolution of 1–2 kilometres.

== Observation by spacecraft ==
There have been numerous uncrewed missions to Venus. Ten Soviet Venera probes achieved a soft landing on the surface, with up to 110 minutes of communication from the surface, all without return. Launch windows occur every 19 months.

=== Early flybys ===
On February 12, 1961, the Soviet spacecraft Venera 1 was the first flyby probe launched to another planet. An overheated orientation sensor caused it to malfunction, losing contact with Earth before its closest approach to Venus of 100,000 km. However, the probe was first to combine all the necessary features of an interplanetary spacecraft: solar panels, parabolic telemetry antenna, 3-axis stabilization, course-correction engine, and the first launch from parking orbit.

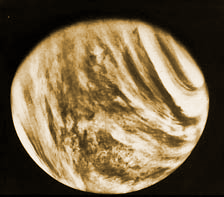
Global view of Venus in ultraviolet light done by Mariner 10.

The first successful flyby Venus probe was the American Mariner 2 spacecraft, which flew past Venus in 1962, coming within 35,000 km. A modified Ranger Moon probe, it established that Venus has practically no intrinsic magnetic field and measured the temperature of the planet's atmosphere to be approximately 500 °C (773 K; 932 °F).

The Soviet Union launched the Venera 2 probe to Venus in 1966, but it malfunctioned sometime after its May 16 telemetry session. The probe completed a flyby of Venus, but failed to transmit any data.

During another American flyby in 1967, Mariner 5 measured the strength of Venus's magnetic field. In 1974, Mariner 10 swung by Venus on its way to Mercury and took ultraviolet photographs of the clouds, revealing the extraordinarily high wind speeds in the Venusian atmosphere. Mariner-10 provided the best images of Venus taken so far, the series of images clearly demonstrated the high speeds of the planet's atmosphere, first seen in the Doppler-effect velocity measurements of Venera-4 through Venera-8.

=== Early landings ===
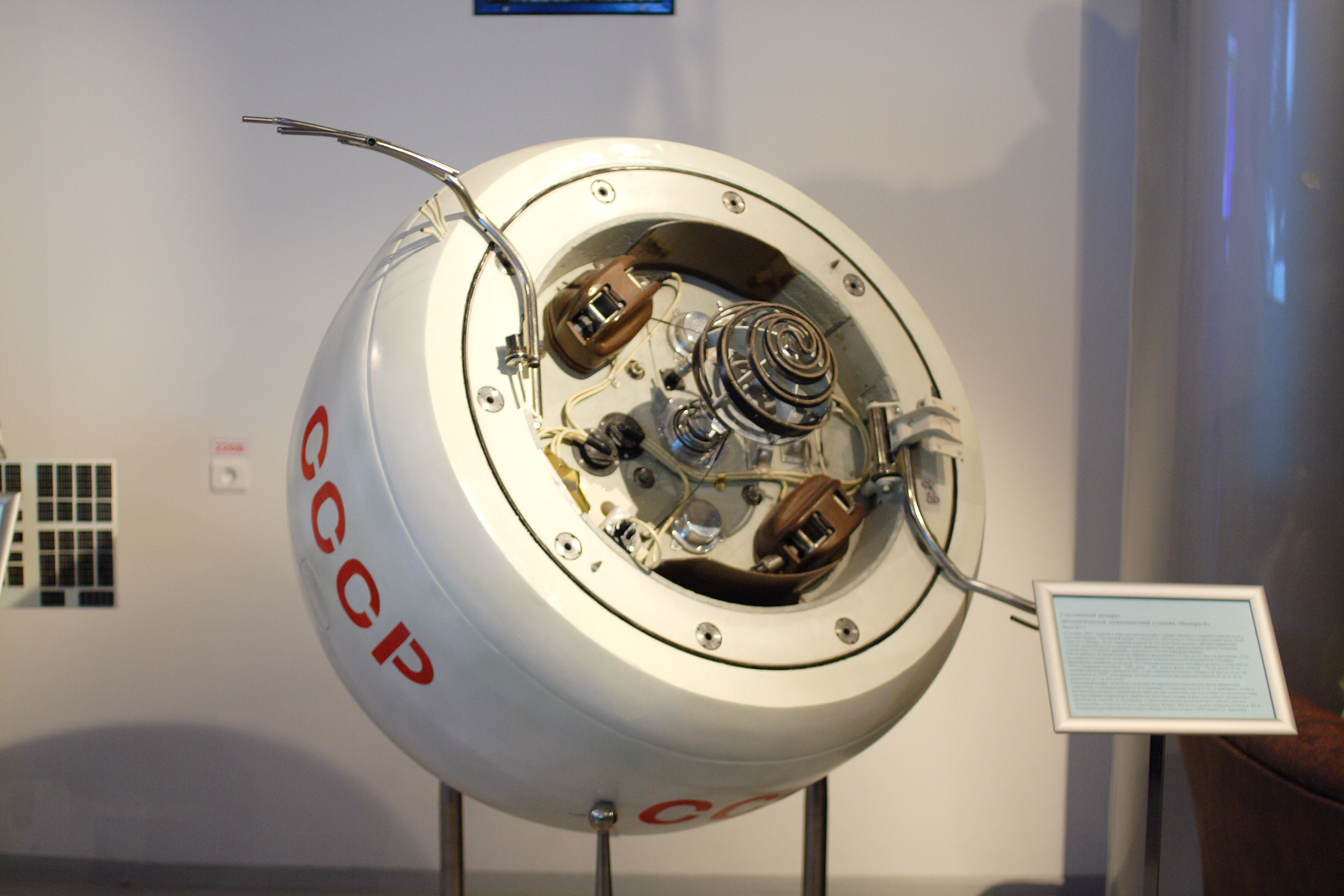
Capsule of Venera-4 in Memorial Museum of Astronautics

On March 1, 1966, the Venera 3 Soviet space probe crash-landed on Venus, becoming the first spacecraft to reach the surface of another planet.

The descent capsule of Venera 4 entered the atmosphere of Venus on October 18, 1967, making it the first probe to return direct measurements from another planet's atmosphere. The capsule measured temperature, pressure, density and performed 11 automatic chemical experiments to analyze the atmosphere. It discovered that the atmosphere of Venus was 95% carbon dioxide (CO_{2}), and in combination with radio occultation data from the Mariner 5 probe, showed that surface pressures were far greater than expected (75 to 100 atmospheres).

These results were verified and refined by the Venera 5 and Venera 6 in May 1969. But thus far, none of these missions had reached the surface while still transmitting. Venera 4's battery ran out while still slowly floating through the massive atmosphere, and Venera 5 and 6 were crushed by high pressure 18 km (60,000 ft) above the surface.

The first successful landing on Venus was by Venera 7 on December 15, 1970 — the first successful soft landing on another planet, as well as the first successful transmission of data from another planet's surface to Earth. Venera 7 remained in contact with Earth for 23 minutes, relaying surface temperatures of 455 to 475 °C (851 to 887 °F), and an atmospheric pressure of 92 bar. Venera 8 landed on July 22, 1972. In addition to pressure and temperature profiles, a photometer showed that the clouds of Venus formed a layer ending over 35 kilometres (22 mi) above the surface. A gamma ray spectrometer analyzed the chemical composition of the crust. Venera 8 measured the light level as being suitable for surface photography, finding it to be similar to the amount of light on Earth on an overcast day with roughly 1 km visibility.

=== Lander/orbiter pairs ===
==== Venera 9 and 10 ====
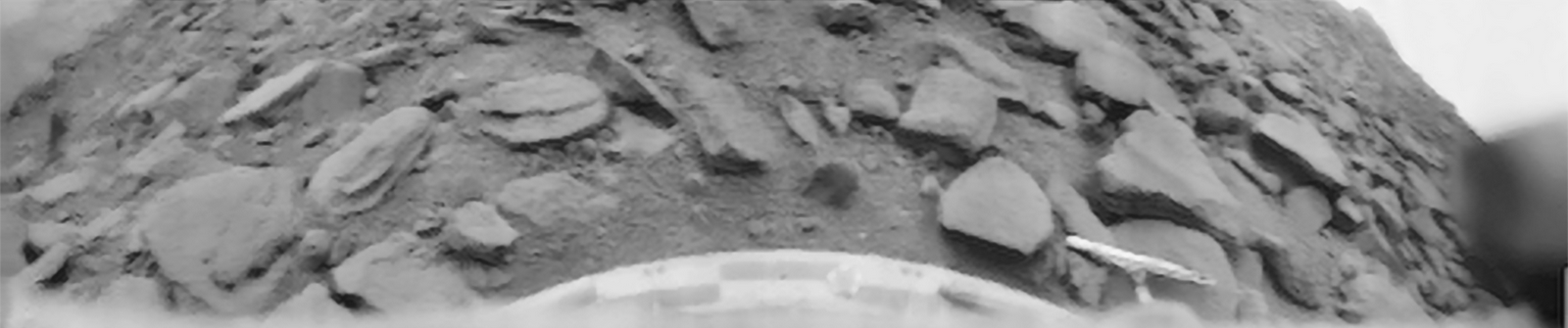
First view and first clear 180-degree panorama of Venus's surface as well as any other planet than Earth (1975, Soviet Venera 9 lander). Black-and-white image of barren, black, slate-like rocks against a flat sky. The ground and the probe are the focus.

The Soviet probe Venera 9 entered orbit on October 22, 1975, becoming the first artificial satellite of Venus. A battery of cameras and spectrometers returned information about the planet's clouds, ionosphere and magnetosphere, as well as performing bi-static radar measurements of the surface. The 660 kg (1,460 lb) descent vehicle separated from Venera 9 and landed, taking the first pictures of the surface and analyzing the crust with a gamma ray spectrometer and a densitometer. During descent, pressure, temperature and photometric measurements were made, as well as backscattering and multi-angle scattering (nephelometer) measurements of cloud density. It was discovered that the clouds of Venus are formed in three distinct layers.

On October 25, Venera 10 arrived and carried out a similar program of study.

==== Pioneer Venus ====
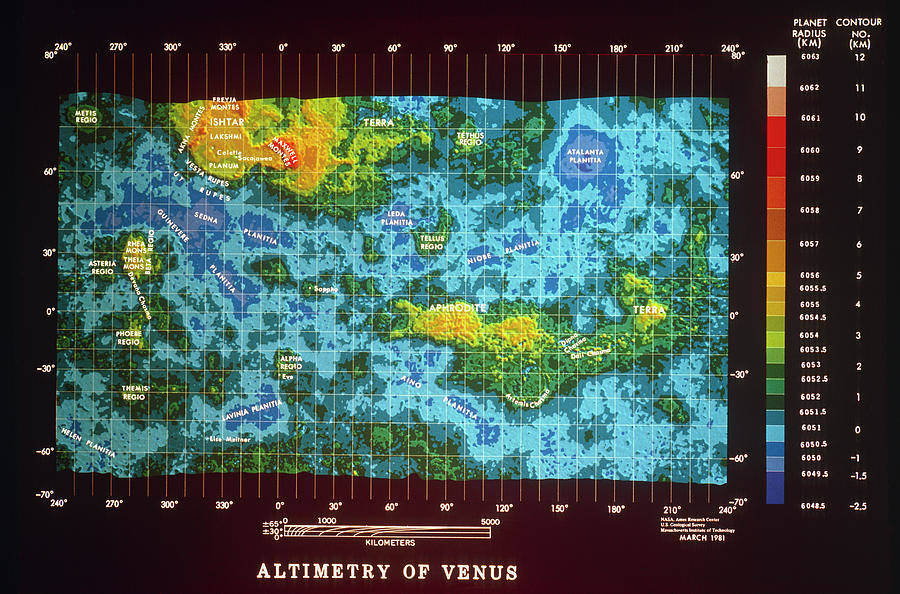
A map of Venus compiled from data recorded by NASA's Pioneer Venus Orbiter spacecraft beginning in 1978.

In 1978, NASA sent two Pioneer spacecraft to Venus. The Pioneer mission consisted of two components, launched separately: an orbiter and a multiprobe. The Pioneer Venus Multiprobe carried one large and three small atmospheric probes. The large probe was released on November 16, 1978, and the three small probes on November 20. All four probes entered the Venusian atmosphere on December 9, followed by the delivery vehicle. Although not expected to survive the descent through the atmosphere, one probe continued to operate for 45 minutes after reaching the surface. The Pioneer Venus Orbiter was inserted into an elliptical orbit around Venus on December 4, 1978. It carried 17 experiments and operated until the fuel used to maintain its orbit was exhausted and atmospheric entry destroyed the spacecraft in August 1992.

=== Further Soviet missions ===
Also in 1978, Venera 11 and Venera 12 flew past Venus, dropping descent vehicles on December 21 and December 25 respectively. The landers carried colour cameras and a soil drill and analyzer, which unfortunately malfunctioned. Each lander made measurements with a nephelometer, mass spectrometer, gas chromatograph, and a cloud-droplet chemical analyzer using X-ray fluorescence that unexpectedly discovered a large proportion of chlorine in the clouds, in addition to sulfur. Strong lightning activity was also detected.

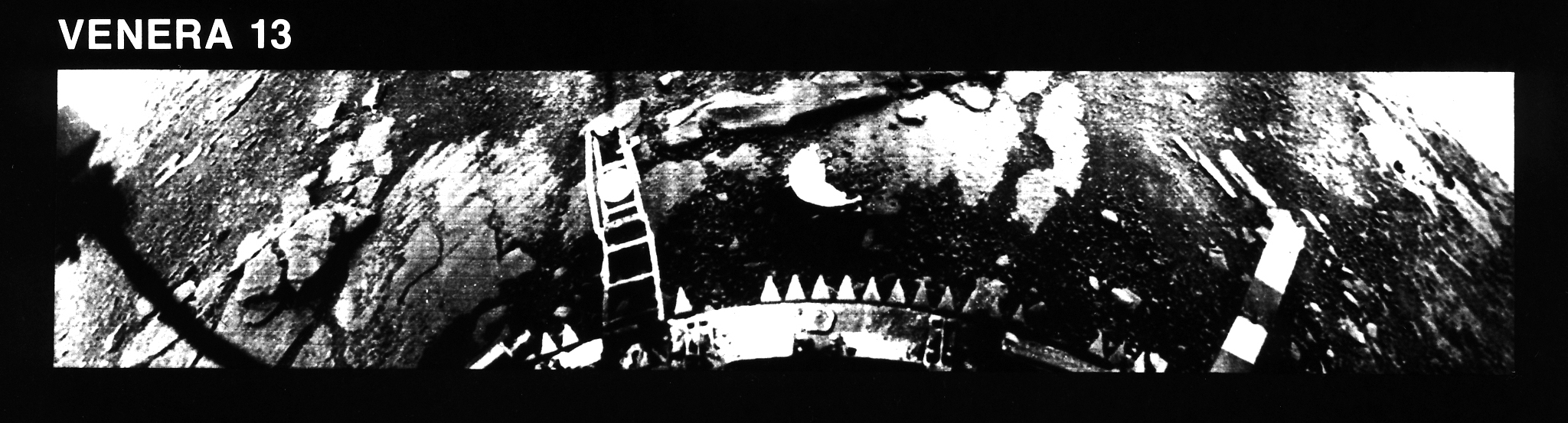
Surface of Venus from Venera 13

In 1982, the Soviet Venera 13 sent the first colour image of Venus's surface, revealing an orange-brown flat bedrock surface covered with loose regolith and small flat thin angular rocks, and analysed the X-ray fluorescence of an excavated soil sample. The probe operated for a record 127 minutes on the planet's hostile surface. Also in 1982, the Venera 14 lander detected possible seismic activity in the planet's crust.

In December 1984, during the apparition of Halley's Comet, the Soviet Union launched the two Vega probes to Venus. Vega 1 and Vega 2 encountered Venus in June 1985, each deploying a lander and an instrumented helium balloon. The balloon-borne aerostat probes floated at about 53 km altitude for 46 and 60 hours respectively, traveling about 1/3 of the way around the planet and allowing scientists to study the dynamics of the most active part of Venus's atmosphere. These measured wind speed, temperature, pressure and cloud density. More turbulence and convection activity than expected was discovered, including occasional plunges of 1 to 3 km in downdrafts. The landing vehicles carried experiments focusing on cloud aerosol composition and structure. Each carried an ultraviolet absorption spectrometer, aerosol particle-size analyzers, and devices for collecting aerosol material and analyzing it with a mass spectrometer, a gas chromatograph, and an X-ray fluorescence spectrometer. The upper two layers of the clouds were found to be sulfuric acid droplets, but the lower layer is probably composed of phosphoric acid solution. The crust of Venus was analyzed with the soil drill experiment and a gamma ray spectrometer. As the landers carried no cameras on board, no images were returned from the surface. They would be the last probes to land on Venus for decades. The Vega spacecraft continued to rendezvous with Halley's Comet nine months later, bringing an additional 14 instruments and cameras for that mission.

The multiaimed Soviet Vesta mission, developed in cooperation with European countries for realisation in 1991–1994 but canceled due to the Soviet Union disbanding, included the delivery of balloons and a small lander to Venus, according to the first plan.

=== Orbiters ===
==== Venera 15 and 16 ====
In October 1983, Venera 15 and Venera 16 entered polar orbits around Venus. The images had a 1–2 kilometres (0.62–1.24 mi) resolution, comparable to those obtained by the best Earth radars. Venera 15 analyzed and mapped the upper atmosphere with an infrared Fourier spectrometer. From November 11, 1983, to July 10, 1984, both satellites mapped the northern third of the planet with synthetic aperture radar. These results provided the first detailed understanding of the surface geology of Venus, including the discovery of unusual massive shield volcanoes such as coronae and arachnoids. Venus had no evidence of plate tectonics, unless the northern third of the planet happened to be a single plate. The altimetry data obtained by the Venera missions had a resolution four times better than Pioneer's.

==== Magellan ====
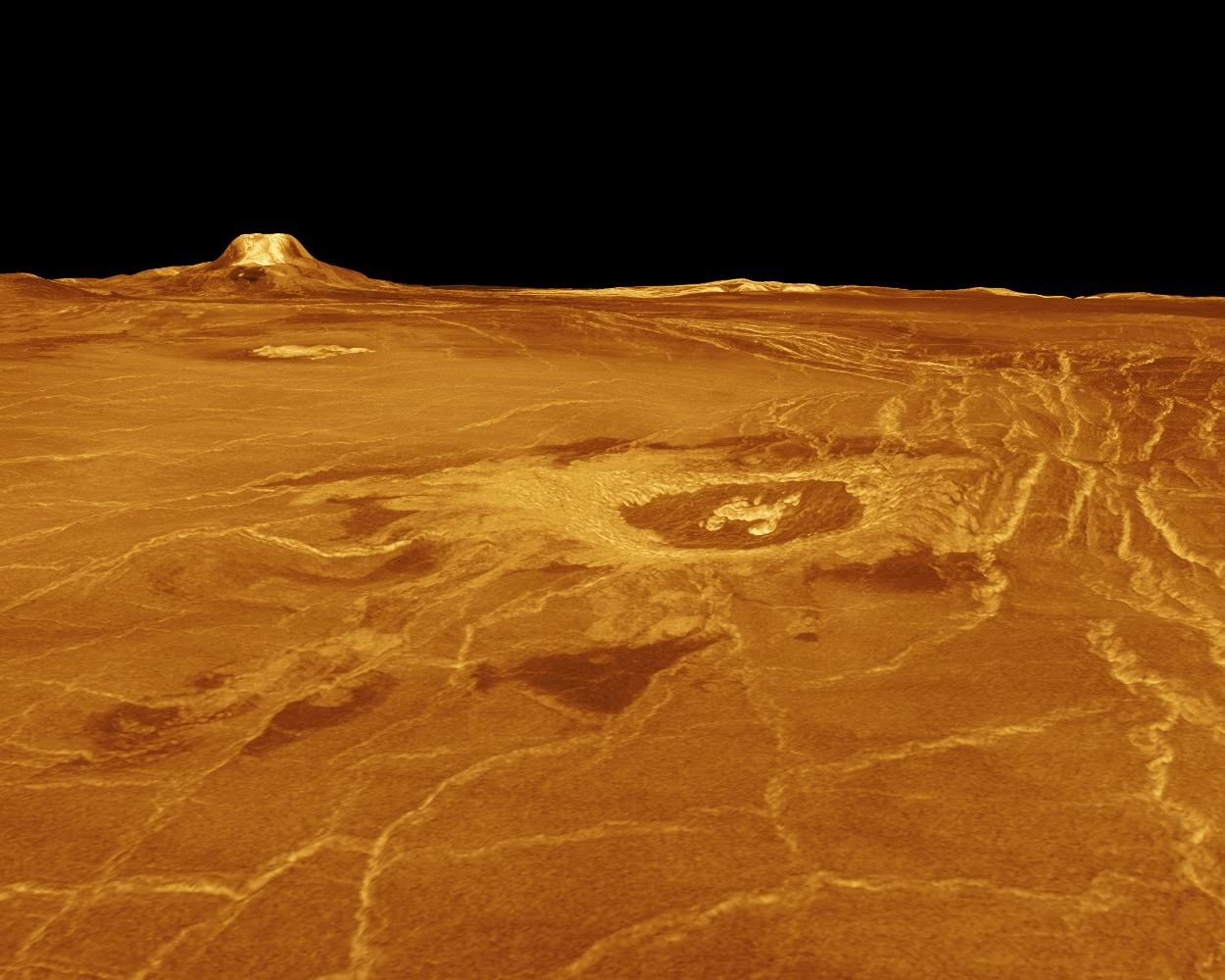
A portion of western Eistla Regio displayed in a three-dimensional perspective view acquired by the Magellan probe. The rise on the horizon is Gula Mons.

On August 10, 1990, the American Magellan probe, named after the explorer Ferdinand Magellan, arrived at its orbit around the planet and started a mission of detailed radar mapping at a frequency of 2.38 GHz. Whereas previous probes had created low-resolution radar maps of continent-sized formations, Magellan mapped 98% of the surface with a resolution of approximately 100 m.

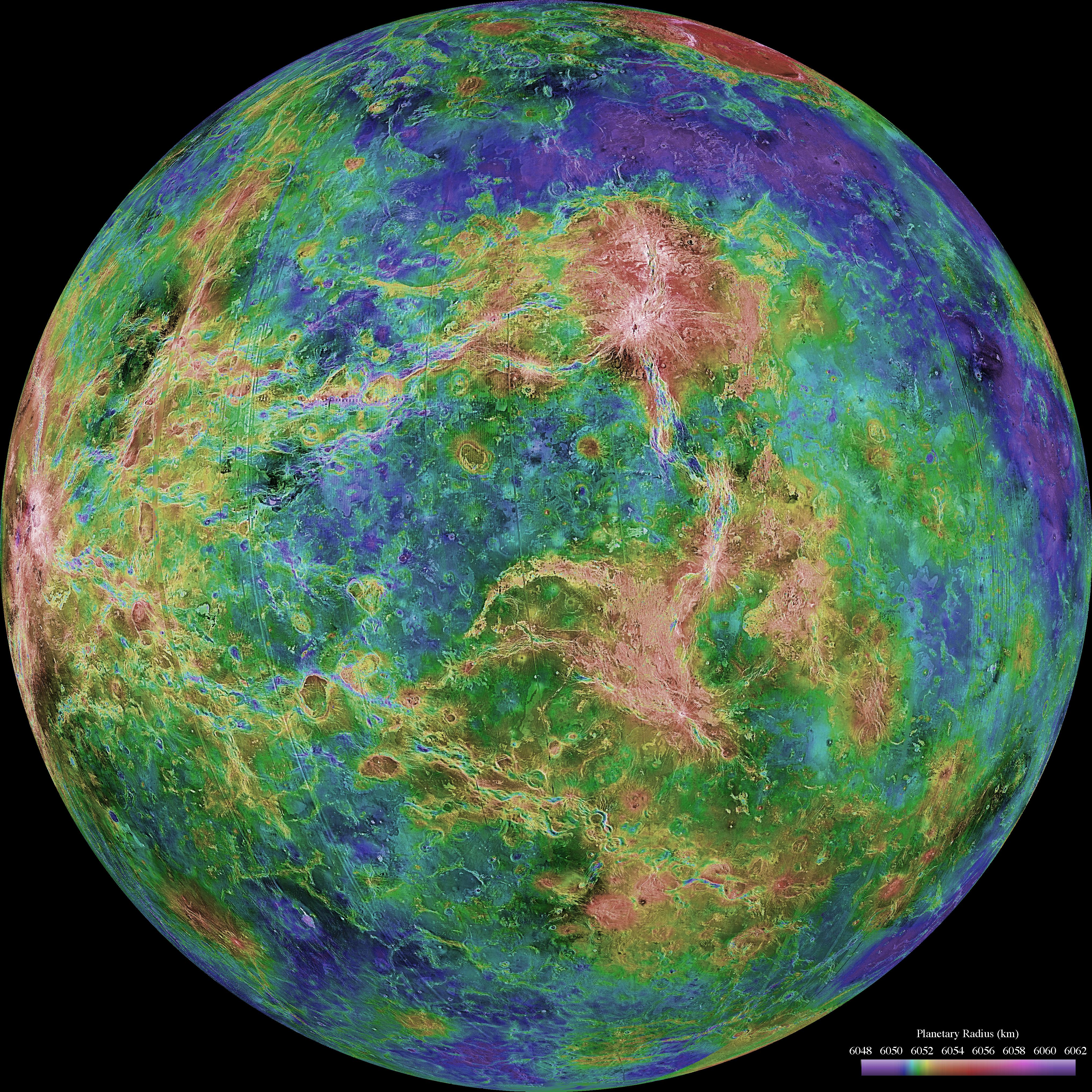
Topography of Venus as revealed by more than a decade of radar investigations culminating in the 1990–1994 Magellan mission

The resulting maps were comparable to visible-light photographs of other planets, and are still the most detailed in existence. Magellan greatly improved scientific understanding of the geology of Venus: the probe found no signs of plate tectonics, but the scarcity of impact craters suggested the surface was relatively young, and there were lava channels thousands of kilometers long. After a four-year mission, Magellan, as planned, plunged into the atmosphere on October 11, 1994, and partly vaporized; some sections are thought to have hit the planet's surface.

==== Venus Express ====
Venus Express was a mission by the European Space Agency to study the atmosphere and surface characteristics of Venus from orbit. The design was based on ESA's Mars Express and Rosetta missions. The probe's main objective was the long-term observation of the Venusian atmosphere, which it is hoped will also contribute to an understanding of Earth's atmosphere and climate. It also made global maps of Venerean surface temperatures, and attempted to observe signs of life on Earth from a distance.

Venus Express successfully assumed a polar orbit on April 11, 2006. The mission was originally planned to last for two Venusian years (about 500 Earth days), but was extended to the end of 2014 until its propellant was exhausted. Some of the first results emerging from Venus Express include evidence of past oceans, the discovery of a huge double atmospheric vortex at the south pole, and the detection of hydroxyl in the atmosphere.

==== Akatsuki ====
Akatsuki was launched on May 20, 2010, by JAXA, and was planned to enter Venusian orbit in December 2010. However, the orbital insertion maneuver failed and the spacecraft was left in heliocentric orbit. It was placed on an alternative elliptical Venerian orbit on 7 December 2015 by firing its attitude control thrusters for 1,233 seconds. The probe imaged the surface in ultraviolet, infrared, microwaves, and radio, and looked for evidence of lightning and volcanism on the planet. Astronomers working on the mission reported detecting a possible gravity wave that occurred on the planet Venus in December 2015. Akatsuki's mission ended in 2024.

=== Flybys ===
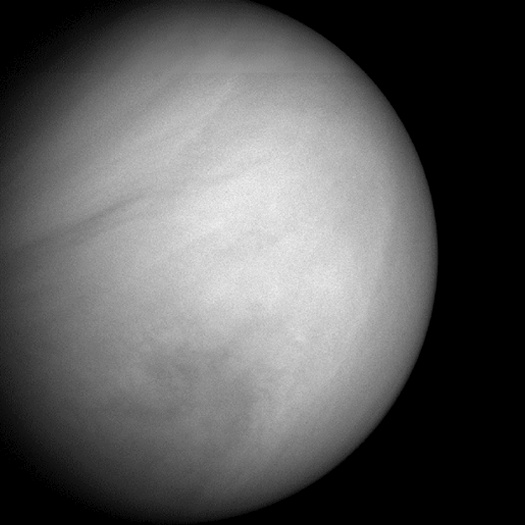
Venus in 2007 by MESSENGER

Several space probes en route to other destinations have used flybys of Venus to increase their speed via the gravitational slingshot method. These include the Galileo mission to Jupiter, and the Cassini–Huygens mission to Saturn, which made two flybys. During Cassini's examination of the radio frequency emissions of Venus with its radio and plasma wave science instrument during both the 1998 and 1999 flybys, it reported no high-frequency radio waves (0.125 to 16 MHz), which are commonly associated with lightning. This was in direct opposition to the findings of the Soviet Venera missions 20 years earlier. It was postulated that perhaps if Venus did have lightning, it might be some type of low-frequency electrical activity, because radio signals cannot penetrate the ionosphere at frequencies below about 1 megahertz. An examination of Venus's radio emissions by the Galileo spacecraft during its flyby in 1990 was interpreted at the time to be indicative of lightning. However, the Galileo probe was over 60 times further from Venus than Cassini was during its flyby, making its observations substantially less significant. In 2007, the Venus Express mission confirmed the presence of lightning on Venus, finding that it is more common on Venus than it is on Earth.

MESSENGER passed by Venus twice on its way to Mercury. The first time, it flew by on October 24, 2006, passing 3000 km from Venus. As Earth was on the other side of the Sun, no data was recorded. The second flyby was on July 6, 2007, where the spacecraft passed only 325 km from the cloudtops.

BepiColombo also flew by Venus twice on its way to Mercury, the first time on October 15, 2020. During its second flyby of Venus, on August 10, 2021, BepiColombo came 552 km near Venus's surface. While BepiColombo approached Venus before making its second flyby of the planet, two monitoring cameras and seven science instruments were switched on. Johannes Benkhoff, project scientist, believes BepiColombo's MERTIS (Mercury Radiometer and Thermal Infrared Spectrometer) could possibly detect phosphine, but "we do not know if our instrument is sensitive enough".

Parker Solar Probe has performed seven Venus flybys, which occurred on October 3, 2018, December 26, 2019, July 11, 2020, February 20, 2021, October 16, 2021, August 21, 2023, and November 6, 2024. Parker Solar Probe makes observations of the Sun and solar wind, and these Venus encounters enable Parker Solar Probe to perform gravity assists and travel closer to the Sun.

=== Future missions ===
India's ISRO is developing Venus Orbiter Mission, an orbiter which is planned to launch in 2028.

In June 2021, NASA announced the selection of two new Venus spacecraft, both part of its Discovery Program: VERITAS and DAVINCI. These spacecraft are the first NASA missions to focus on Venus since Magellan in 1990. VERITAS, an orbiter, will map the surface of Venus in high resolution, while DAVINCI will include an orbiter, which will map Venus in multiple wavelengths, and a descent probe that will study the chemistry of the Venusian atmosphere while taking photographs of the descent. DAVINCI and VERITAS were initially slated to launch in 2029 and 2028 respectively, but funding issues have pushed VERITAS's launch date back to at least 2029–2031.

In June 2021, soon after NASA announced VERITAS and DAVINCI, ESA announced Venus orbiter EnVision as part of their Cosmic Vision program. EnVision is planned to perform high-resolution radar mapping and atmospheric studies of Venus, and is planned to launch in 2031.

On October 6, 2021, the United Arab Emirates announced its intention to send a probe to Venus as early as 2028. MBR Explorer would make observations of the planet while using it for a gravity assist to propel it to the asteroid belt.

Rocket Lab, a private aerospace manufacturer, hopes to launch the first private Venus mission in collaboration with MIT. The spacecraft, Venus Life Finder, is to send a lightweight atmospheric probe into the Venusian atmosphere to search for signs of life.

=== Proposals ===
The Russian Venera-D mission was proposed in 2003 for a launch in 2036. Its prime purpose is to map Venus's surface using a powerful radar. The mission would also include a lander capable to function for a long duration on the surface.

To overcome the high pressure and temperature at the surface, a team led by Geoffrey Landis of NASA's Glenn Research Center produced a concept in 2007 of a solar-powered aircraft that would control a resistant surface rover on the ground. The aircraft would carry the mission's sensitive electronics in the relatively mild temperatures of Venus's upper atmosphere. Another concept from 2007 suggests to equip a rover with a Stirling cooler powered by a nuclear power source to keep an electronics package at an operational temperature of about 200 °C (392 °F).

In 2020 NASA's JPL launched an open competition, titled "Exploring Hell: Avoiding Obstacles on a Clockwork Rover", to design a sensor that could work on Venus's surface.

== Current missions ==
Mission	Launch	Arrival	Termination	Objective
Solar Orbiter	February 9, 2020	26 December 2020 (1st flyby)	ongoing	8 flybys during gravity-assist maneuvers from 2020 to 2030

== Planned missions ==
Name	Operator	Proposed launch year	Type	Status	Reference
Chasing the Long-term Variability of Our Nearest Neighbor Planet Venus (CLOVE)	(South Korea) (Lithuania) Institute for Basic Science/NanoAvionics	2026	Venus observatory in Low Earth Orbit	under development	
Venus Life Finder	(United States) (New Zealand) MIT/Rocket Lab	NET summer 2026	Atmospheric probe	under development	
MBR Explorer	(United Arab Emirates) UAESA	2028	Flyby	under development	
Venus Orbiter Mission	(India) ISRO	29 March 2028	Orbiter/atmospheric probe	under development	
VERITAS	(United States) NASA	2031	Orbiter	under development	
DAVINCI	(United States) NASA	2031–2032	Atmospheric probe	under development	
EnVision	ESA	2031–2032	Orbiter	under development	

== Impact ==
Research on the atmosphere of Venus has produced significant insights not only about its own state but also about the atmospheres of other planetary objects, especially of Earth. It has helped to find and understand the depletion of Earth's ozone in the 1970s and 1980s.

The voyage of James Cook and his crew of HMS Endeavour to observe the Venus transit of 1769 brought about the claiming of Australia at Possession Island for colonisation by Europeans.

== See also ==
- Manned Venus flyby
