= Venus Orbiter Mission =

Planned Indian Venus orbiter

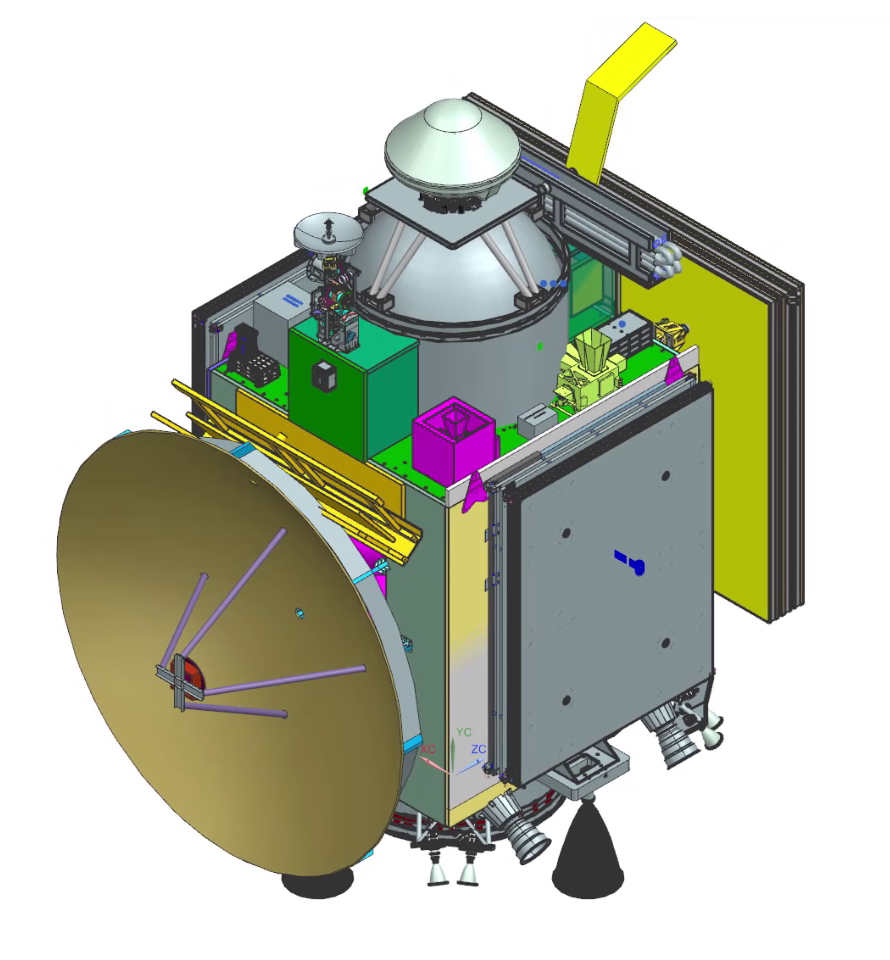
- Venus Orbiter Mission (VOM) in stowed configuration
- Mission type: Venus orbiter
- Operator: ISRO
- Mission duration: Planned: 4 years

Spacecraft properties
- Manufacturer: URSC
- Launch mass: 2,500 kg (5,500 lb)
- Payload mass: ~100 kg (220 lb)
- Power: 500 watts (0.67 hp) for payload

Start of mission
- Launch date: 29 March 2028 (planned)
- Rocket: LVM3
- Launch site: SDSC SLP
- Contractor: ISRO

Orbital parameters
- Reference system: Cytherocentric
- Periapsis altitude: 200 km
- Apoapsis altitude: 600 km

Venus orbiter
- Orbital insertion: 19 July 2028 (planned)

Venus atmospheric probe
- Spacecraft component: Aerobot balloon

The Venus Orbiter Mission (VOM), unofficially known as Shukrayaan (Sanskrit: Śukra 'Venus', Yāna 'Craft, Vehicle'), is a planned ISRO mission to study the surface and atmosphere of Venus.

Funds were released in 2017 to complete preliminary studies, and solicitations for instruments were announced. The orbiter was expected to have a science payload capability of approximately 100 kilograms (220 lb) with 500 watt available power. The initial elliptical orbit around Venus is expected to be 500 km (310 mi) at periapsis & 60,000 km (37,000 mi) at apoapsis. On 18 September 2024, the mission was formally approved by the Indian government and the launch date was set to March 2028. On 1 October 2024, ISRO announced the launch date to be 29 March 2028, with a journey of 112 days, thereby reaching the Venusian orbit on 19 July 2028.

== Objectives ==
The three broad research areas of interest for this mission include surface/subsurface stratigraphy and re-surfacing processes; studying the atmospheric chemistry, dynamics and compositional variations, and studying solar irradiance and solar wind interaction with Venus's ionosphere. The mission may carry out research on Venus's active volcanic hotspots, lava flows and their patterns. The probe may reexamine claims of phosphine on Venus, as the findings are currently thought to be in error.

== History ==
=== Initial concept ===
Based on the success of Chandrayaan and the Mars Orbiter Mission, ISRO began studying the feasibility of interplanetary mission to Venus. A mission to Venus was first presented at Tirupati space meet in 2012. ISRO was authorized to complete preliminary studies. From 2016 to 2017, ISRO collaborated with the Japan Aerospace Exploration Agency (JAXA) to study the Venus atmosphere using signals from the Akatsuki in a radio occultation experiment.

In 2017, ISRO made an 'Announcement of Opportunity' (AO) seeking science payload proposals from Indian academia. In 2018, ISRO made another 'Announcement of Opportunity' inviting payload proposals from the international scientific community. The available science payload capacity with a science payload of 100 kg.

ISRO and the French National Centre for Space Studies (CNES) held collaboration discussions in 2018, including the Venus mission and autonomous navigation and aerobraking technologies. French astrophysicist Jacques Blamont expressed interest to ISRO chairman Udupi Ramachandra Rao to use balloons to help study the Venusian atmosphere. Similar to the Vega missions, these instrumented balloons could be deployed from an orbiter and take prolonged observations while floating in the planet's relatively mild upper atmosphere. ISRO agreed to consider the proposal to use a balloon probe carrying a 10 kilograms (22 lb) payload to study the Venusian atmosphere at a 55 kilometres (34 mi) altitude.

As of late 2018, the Venus mission was in the configuration study phase and ISRO had not sought the Indian government's full approval. Somak Raychaudhury, the director of Inter-University Centre for Astronomy and Astrophysics (IUCAA), stated in 2019 that a drone-like probe was being considered.

As of November 2020, ISRO had shortlisted 20 international proposals that include collaboration with institutions from Russia, France, Sweden and Germany. Mission could be launched no earlier than 2028, with an alternate launch window in 2031.

S. Somanath, the chairman of ISRO, stated that engineers are aiming to lower the cost of some high-value components and that India's maiden mission to Venus is probably going to launch in 2028 while speaking with reporters during India International Science Festival 2024. Venus Orbiter Mission development, however, will take longer than expected because Gaganyaan project has taken precedence.

During an interview to Asian News International on 28 September 2024, Jan Thesleff, the Swedish ambassador to India, reaffirmed that ISRO and the Swedish Space Corporation (SSC) are working together on the Venus Orbiter Mission.

=== Cabinet approval ===
The Venus Orbiter Mission (VOM), which is intended to insert a spacecraft in the orbit of planet Venus for a better understanding of its surface, subsurface, atmospheric processes, and influence of Sun on its atmosphere, was approved by the Union Cabinet on September 18, 2024, under the direction of Prime Minister Narendra Modi. Understanding the fundamental processes that have transformed Venus—which is thought to have once been habitable and very comparable to Earth—will be crucial to comprehending the development of Earth and Venus, the sister planets. A total of ₹1,236 crore (equivalent to ₹13 billion or US$140 million in 2026) has been sanctioned for the Venus Orbiter Mission, of which ₹824 crore (equivalent to ₹878 crore or US$94 million in 2026) would go towards the spacecraft.

On 1 October 2024, ISRO announced the dates of the mission. The launch date was set to 29 March 2028. The spacecraft will journey towards Venus for 112 days, thus reaching the Venusian orbit on 19 July 2028. The Venusian atmospheric insertion date is yet to be announced. ISRO issued a further call for potential research using the instruments to be conducted by the spacecraft in late-September 2025. A National Level Science meet was held in Delhi the following october to debate on the research strategies for the mission.

=== Spacecraft development ===
The preliminary design report was conducted for the VOM mission was completed for the spacecraft by April 2026. As of November 2026, ISRO had finished the spacecraft's design evaluations and had started hardware realization, which entails creating, producing, and assembling the spacecraft's actual parts, its scientific instruments and auxiliary systems.

== Science payload ==
The 100 kg (220 lb) science payload would consist of instruments from India and other countries. As of 1 October 2024, 16 Indian payloads, 2 collaborative payloads and an international payload had been manifested for the spacecraft. Renders of the probe by URSC have also included an atmospheric probe/aerobot balloon.

=== Indian instruments ===
- VSAR (Venus S-Band Synthetic Aperture Radar): It aims to search for active volcanism and map Venus with high resolution, providing insights into the planet's topography and surface properties. It is targeted to study geological features on the surface of Venus such as topography, volcanism, and impact craters, updating databases created by Magellan. Royal Holloway has also supported the development of this instrument by providing certain software on signal data processing from the Instrument.
- VSEAM (Venus Surface Emissivity and Atmospheric Mapper): This hyperspectral spectrometer will study Venus's surface and atmosphere, focusing on volcanic hotspots, cloud structure, and water vapor mapping.
- VTC (Venus Thermal Camera): Designed to map thermal emissions from Venusian clouds, it will provide critical data on atmospheric dynamics and planetary-scale features.
- VCMC (Venus Cloud Monitoring Camera): This UV and visible wavelength camera will capture atmospheric circulation dynamics and study wave phenomena and lightning.
- LIVE (Lightning Instrument for Venus): LIVE will detect electrical activity in Venus’s atmosphere, analyzing lightning and plasma emissions.
- VASP (Venus Atmospheric Spectropolarimeter): This instrument will investigate cloud properties.
- SPAV (Solar occultation photometry): SPAV will measure the vertical distribution of aerosols and haze in Venus’s mesosphere.
- Narrow band oxygen Airglow detection in Venusian Atmosphere (NAVA): The NAVA payload employs a novel photometric technique which has been successfully augmented into a CCD based instrument to measure Venusian airglow emissions.
- VEnus THermosphere Ionosphere composition Analyser (VETHICA) : The VETHICA is a quadrupole mass spectrometer that will study the altitude-latitude distribution of neutral and ion composition in the Thermosphere-ionosphere-exosphere region of Venus and to investigate the dynamics of Venusian plasma environment.
- Venus Advanced Radar for Topside Ionosphere and Subsurface Sounding (VARTISS): VARTISS is a low frequency radar sounder that operates in two modes; ionospheric mode and subsurface mode. VARTISS will study the structure of the Venusian ionosphere and help to Investigate the vertical structure and stratigraphy of geological units. VARTISS has two receivers: one to probe the atmosphere and surface, and another to probe the subsurface upto a depth of 1 kilometre, each routed through different antennae.
- Venusian Electron temperature and Density Analyser (VEDA): The scientific objectives of VEDA instrument are to understand the variability of ionopause altitude and its effects on local air pressure .
- Retarding Potential Analyser (RPA) is a plasma diagnostic tool which uses a series of electrostatic grids to measure the ion energy distribution.
- Venus Ionospheric Plasma wave detectoR (VIPER): The science objectives of the VIPER instrument are to sample the plasma and magnetic environment around Venus and to characterize plasma waves surrounding the planet.
- Venus Radiation environment monitor (VeRad): The objective of the VeRad instrument are to study the impact of Supra-thermal and high energy solar energetic particles (SEPs) on the Venus atmosphere and investigate their role in the sustenance of ionosphere on the nightside.
- Solar Soft X-ray Spectrometer (SSXS) for Venus Orbiter: The primary scientific objective of Solar Soft X-ray Spectrometer (S3) onboard Venus orbiter is to measure the solar irradiance in the soft X-ray region entering in to the Venus atmosphere.
- Venus Orbit Dust Experiment (VODEX): VODEX is an impact ionization dust detector made of thin sheet or foil of gold plate. The major scientific objectives of VODEX is to study abundance, flux and distribution of Interplanetary Dust Particles (IDPs) at Venus.

=== International Collaboration Instruments ===
- Venus Ionospheric and Solar Wind particle AnalySer (VISWAS): VISWAS has two components namely Plasma Analyser (PA) which will be developed by SPL, VSSC and the Venusian Neutrals Analyzer (VNA), contributed by the Swedish Institute of Space Physics. The instrument will study the interaction between charged particles from the Sun and Venus's atmosphere.
- Radio Anatomy of Venus Ionosphere (RAVI): Designed and developed in collaboration with a German team, RAVI will study the thermal structure in the Venus atmosphere above and below the clouds, Variation of ionosphere under quiet and disturbed solar conditions and to estimate the contribution of Sulphuric Acid in the energetics of the Venus atmosphere.

=== International Instruments ===
Two Russian payloads by the Russian Space Research Institute and Moscow Institute of Physics and Technology, namely VIRAL and IVOLGA were shortlisted to study the atmosphere. Of them, VIRAL has been selected for launch.

- VIRAL (Venus InfraRed Atmospheric Gases Linker) by Space Research Institute, Moscow (after their collaboration with LATMOS, France ended).

=== Proposed instruments ===
- Terahertz devices to generate powerful radar pulses. Proposed by NASA.
- IVOLGA: A laser heterodyne NIR spectrometer for studying the structure and dynamics of the Venusian mesosphere.

== See also ==
- List of missions to Venus
  - DAVINCI: planned NASA mission as a part of the Discovery program, will launch in 2031
  - VERITAS: planned NASA mission as a part of the Discovery program, will launch in 2031.
  - EnVision: planned ESA mission as a part of the Cosmic Vision program, will launch in 2031.
- Observations and explorations of Venus
- Chandrayaan programme
- Mars Orbiter Mission
- Aditya-L1
