= Suzanne Smrekar =

American astronomer

Suzanne Elizabeth Smrekar
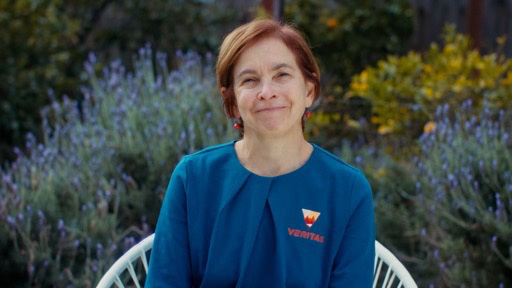
- Education: Brown University, Southern Methodist University
- Known for: Mars InSight lander, Mars Reconnaissance Orbiter

Suzanne E. Smrekar is an American geophysicist and Deputy Principal Investigator for the Mars InSight lander and the principal investigator for the planned VERITAS space probe to Venus.

== Background ==
Smrekar obtained her B.S. degree in geophysics and mathematics from Brown University in 1984, and her doctorate in geophysics from Southern Methodist University in 1990. She was a postdoctoral researcher at MIT before joining the Jet Propulsion Laboratory (JPL) in 1992.

== Career ==
=== Published works ===
Smrekar and colleague Ellen Stofan reported in Science in 1997 that Venus' heat loss was caused by volcanic activity and formations specific to Venus. As Venus has no plate tectonics like Earth, she and others are attempting to study its volcanalogy to draw better conclusions about the formation of Earth. Smrekar and an international team of researchers presented the Venus Emissivity Mapper (VEM) at a conference in 2018; this device scans the planet's surface at specific wavelengths to record the mineral composition, and uses other channels to determine cloud cover, weather, interference, and volcanic activity.

Smrekar remains a team member of the joint Brown – MIT NASA Lunar Science Institute. She has jointly written several articles for the Encyclopedia of the Solar System.

=== NASA Missions ===
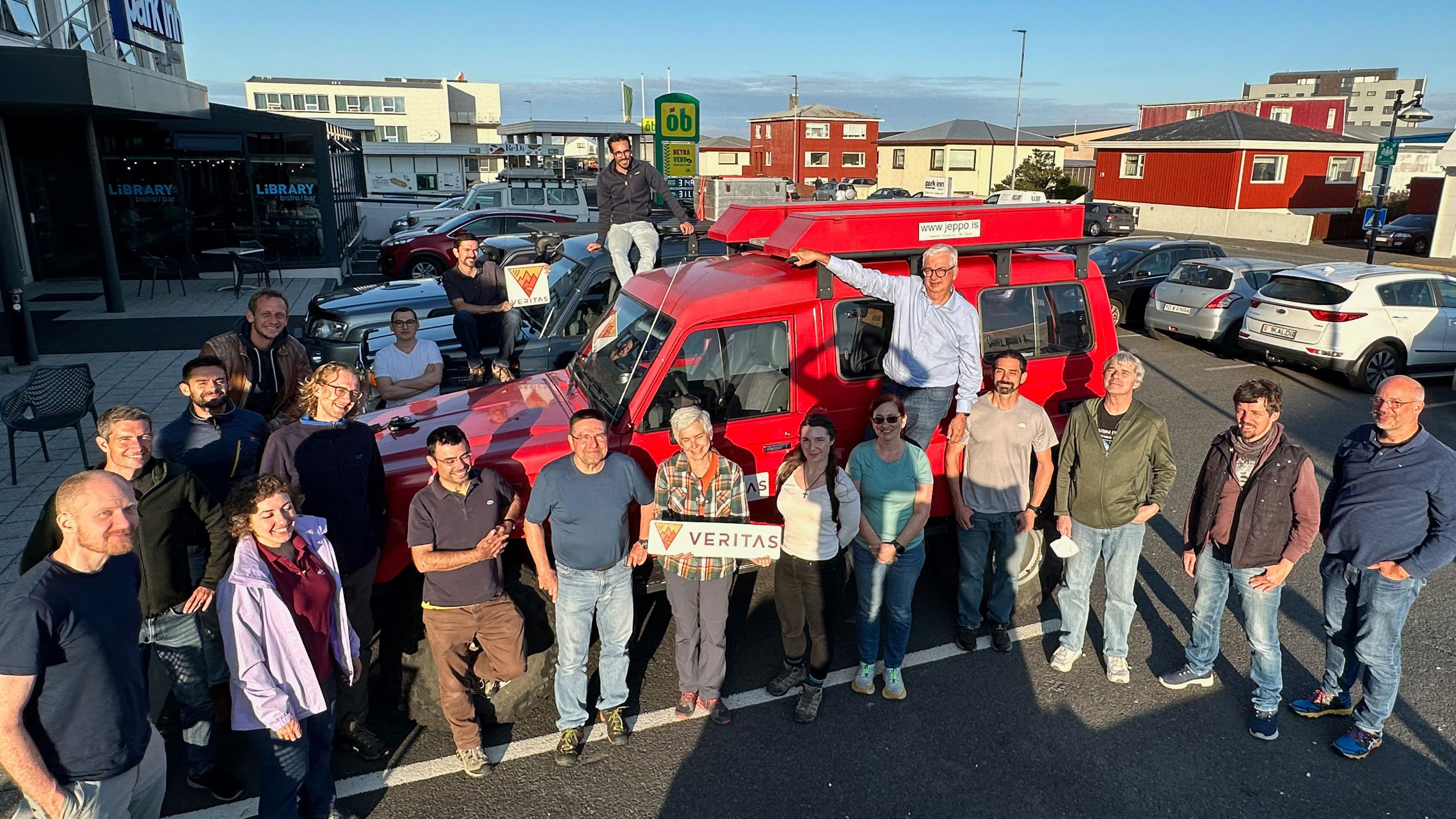
Members of NASA’s VERITAS science team. Principal Investigator Smrekar is holding the VERITAS logo.

Smrekar has formed part of multiple NASA teams dedicated to exploring the Solar System. In 1999, she was involved with the design of the ground-penetrant micro-laboratories Deep Space 2 that "hitchhiked" on the Mars Polar Lander. She was Deputy Project Leader for the Mars Reconnaissance Orbiter (MRO), which, in addition to monitoring the eventual descent for multiple Martian instrument landings, used its shallow- and deep-penetration radar to uncover a pool of solid carbon dioxide at Mars' South Pole – "equivalent to Lake Superior." Direct observation of the Martian lithosphere led to some of the first accurate measurements of the interior temperature of the planet. Her Magellan probe uncovered newly-active geology on the planet. She designed the HP3 and GEMS instrument packages for the InSight mission, which commenced in 2016. Smrekar served as Deputy Principal Investigator in addition to constructing much of the ground-penetrant instrumentation for InSight. She lightly referred to needing to obtain sub-surface results of Martian geography and geology as understanding "...the whole enchilada" of non-Earth planets.

=== Minor planet discoverer ===
On 14 June 1983, Smrekar discovered asteroid 6819 McGarvey at Palomar Observatory. She named it after her mother, Flora McGarvey Smrekar (1924–1977).

== Recognition ==
- 2026 – Explorers Club 50 (EC50) Awardee
- 2016 – Winner, NASA small robotics funding for VERITAS
- 2015 – Elected to International Academy of Astronautics
- 2012 – NASA Exceptional Scientific Achievement Medal
- 2012 – Keck Institute for Space Studies (KISS) lecture
- 1996 – Presidential Early Career Award for Scientists and Engineers, nominee
- 1993 – NASA Group Science Award, Magellan Science Group
- 1984 – Department of Geological Sciences Senior Thesis Award, Brown University

== See also ==
- List of minor planet discoverers § S. Smrekar
