= EnVision =

Planned ESA mission to Venus

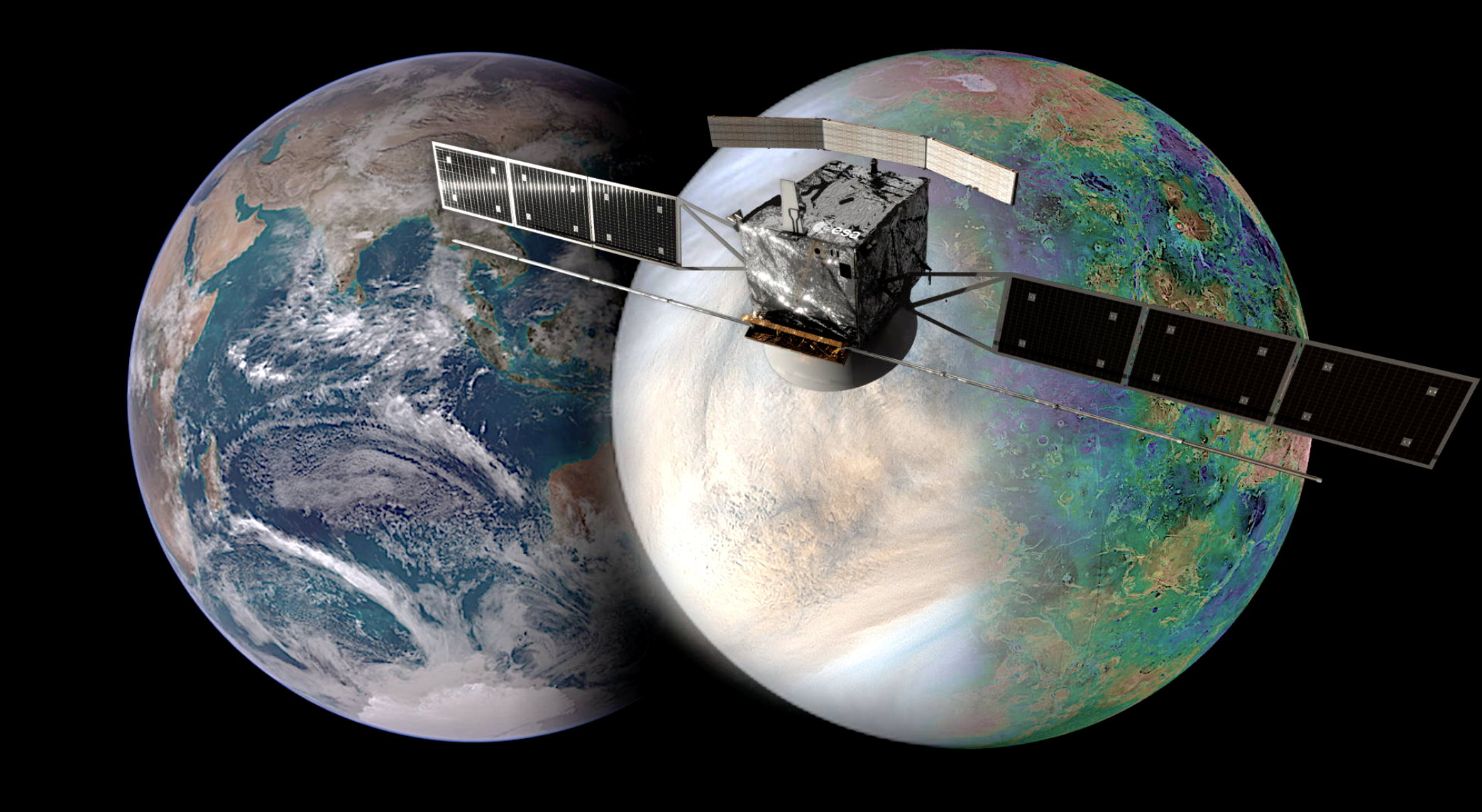
- Mission type: Venus orbiter
- Operator: European Space Agency
- Website: esa.int/.../Envision
- Mission duration: 4.5 years (planned)

Spacecraft properties
- Manufacturer: Thales Alenia Space
- Launch mass: 2,607 kg (5,747 lb)
- Dry mass: 1,277 kg (2,815 lb)
- Payload mass: 255 kg (562 lb)
- Power: 2.35 kW

Start of mission
- Launch date: 2032 (planned)
- Rocket: Ariane 64
- Launch site: Kourou ELA-4
- Contractor: Arianespace

Venus orbiter
- Orbital insertion: 2035

Orbital parameters
- Pericytherion altitude: 220 km (140 mi)
- Apocytherion altitude: 470 km (290 mi)

Transponders
- Band: X-band, Ka-band
Instruments
- VenSAR: Venus Synthetic Aperture Radar
- SRS: Venus Subsurface Radar Sounder
- VenSpec: Venus Spectroscopy Suite
- RSE: Radio Science Experiment
- Provisional ESA insignia Cosmic Vision (Science Programme)

EnVision is an orbital mission to Venus being developed by the European Space Agency (ESA) that is planned to perform high-resolution radar mapping and atmospheric studies. EnVision is designed to help scientists understand the relationships between its geological activity and the atmosphere, and it will investigate why Venus and Earth took different evolutionary paths. The probe was selected as the fifth medium mission (M5) of ESA's Cosmic Vision programme in June 2021. The launch is planned for 2032.

Animation of EnVision's proposed trajectory from 15 June 2032 to 1 March 2034 EnVision · Earth · Venus · Sun

Animation of EnVision's proposed trajectory during the aerobraking phase around Venus

== History ==
=== Background ===
In the early 2020s, a new fleet of Venus missions was announced by NASA and ESA. Missions under development include ESA's EnVision orbiter mission, NASA's VERITAS orbiter mission, and NASA's DAVINCI entry probe/flyby mission. The data acquired with these missions from the end of the decade are expected to fundamentally improve the understanding of the planet's history, activity, and evolution.

The scientists who submitted the EnVision proposal in response to the call for proposals for the M5 mission of ESA's Cosmic Vision program are Richard Ghail of Royal Holloway, University of London, UK, Colin Wilson, Department of Physics, University of Oxford, UK, Thomas Widemann, LESIA, Observatoire de Paris and Université de Versailles-Saint-Quentin, France, and others.

=== Development ===
On 10 June 2021, the mission was selected by ESA's Science Programme Committee as the fifth M-class mission in the Cosmic Vision programme. It was selected over THESEUS (Transient High-Energy Sky and Early Universe Surveyor), an astrophysics mission proposal that would monitor transient events, especially gamma-ray bursts, across the whole sky.

Technical preparatory work on EnVision was being conducted even before the mission's official adoption by ESA. For example, in July 2022, the Low Earth Orbit Facility (LEOX) facility at ESTEC was testing materials and coatings from the spacecraft to simulate the condition during aerobraking at Venus.

EnVision was officially adopted by ESA's Science Programme Committee in January 2024 and in January 2025, ESA awarded a contract to Thales Alenia Space to build the spacecraft as the mission's prime contractor. On 15 May 2026, OHB Space UK signed an agreement with Thales Alenia Space for the assembly, integration, and testing of EnVision.

=== Cooperation with NASA ended ===
In 2025, NASA's participation in EnVision came into question after the Republican administration released a budget request for NASA for the fiscal year 2026, which included drastic cuts to the agency's science programmes. ESA's Director of Science Carole Mundell announced that EnVision was among three ESA missions (together with LISA and NewAthena) most impacted by this potential budget reduction on the US side and that "recovery actions" would be required. This proposed budget reduction was declined by Congress in January 2026, with JPL's work on the VenSAR instrument continuing as planned.

In September 2026, ESA's EnVision project scientist Anne Grete Straume-Lindner said about NASA's participation: "it is looking like they are not able to provide the radar". At that time, two teams in the UK and Italy were working on European radar designs for EnVision under contracts with ESA. Because of this, the launch was delayed by one year to 2032. In October 2026, NASA program scientist Nick Lang confirmed that NASA decided to end its participation in the mission.

== Science goals ==
EnVision will deliver new insights into geological history through complementary imagery, polarimetry, radiometry and spectroscopy of the surface coupled with subsurface sounding and gravity mapping; it will search for thermal, morphological, and gaseous signs of volcanic and other geological activity; and it will trace the fate of key volatile species from their sources and sinks at the surface through the clouds up to the mesosphere. Core science measurements include: high-resolution mapping of specific targets, surface change, geomorphology, topography, subsurface, thermal emission, SO_{2}, H_{2}O, D/H ratio, gravity, spin rate, and spin axis.

The specific mission goals are:

- Determine the level and nature of current activity
- Determine the sequence of geological events that generated its range of surface features
- Assess whether Venus once had oceans or was hospitable for life
- Understand the organising geodynamic framework that controls the release of internal heat over the history of the planet

In 2025, ESA formulated the mission goals as "top five questions" that EnVision aims to solve:

- How geologically active is Venus today?
- How are Venus's thick clouds sustained?
- How does Venus lose its heat?
- Where did Venus's water go?
- How does the planet's surface change over time?

== Spacecraft ==
The EnVision orbiter will be a rectangular, 3-axis stabilised spacecraft of 2 m × 2 m × 3 m in stowed configuration. Energy will be provided by two deployable solar arrays. Communication with Earth will be provided by a fixed 2.54 m diameter High Gain Antenna. The high thrust required by EnVision's mission profile will be provided by a bi-propellant ~1 kN main engine LEROS 4 with specific impulse of ~320s.

== Instruments ==
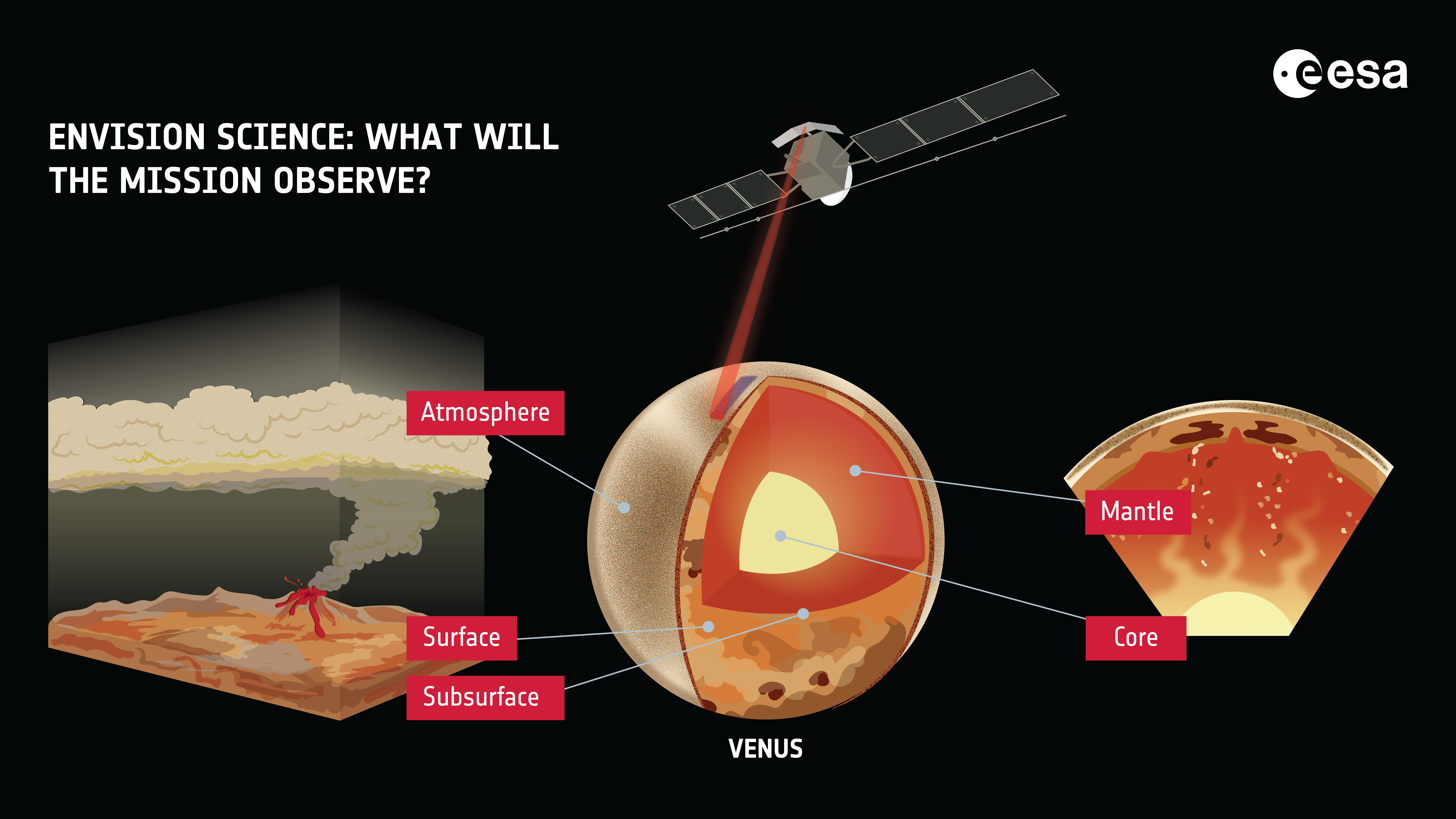
EnVision will observe Venus from its inner core up to its upper atmosphere, to further reveal the planet's history, activity and climate

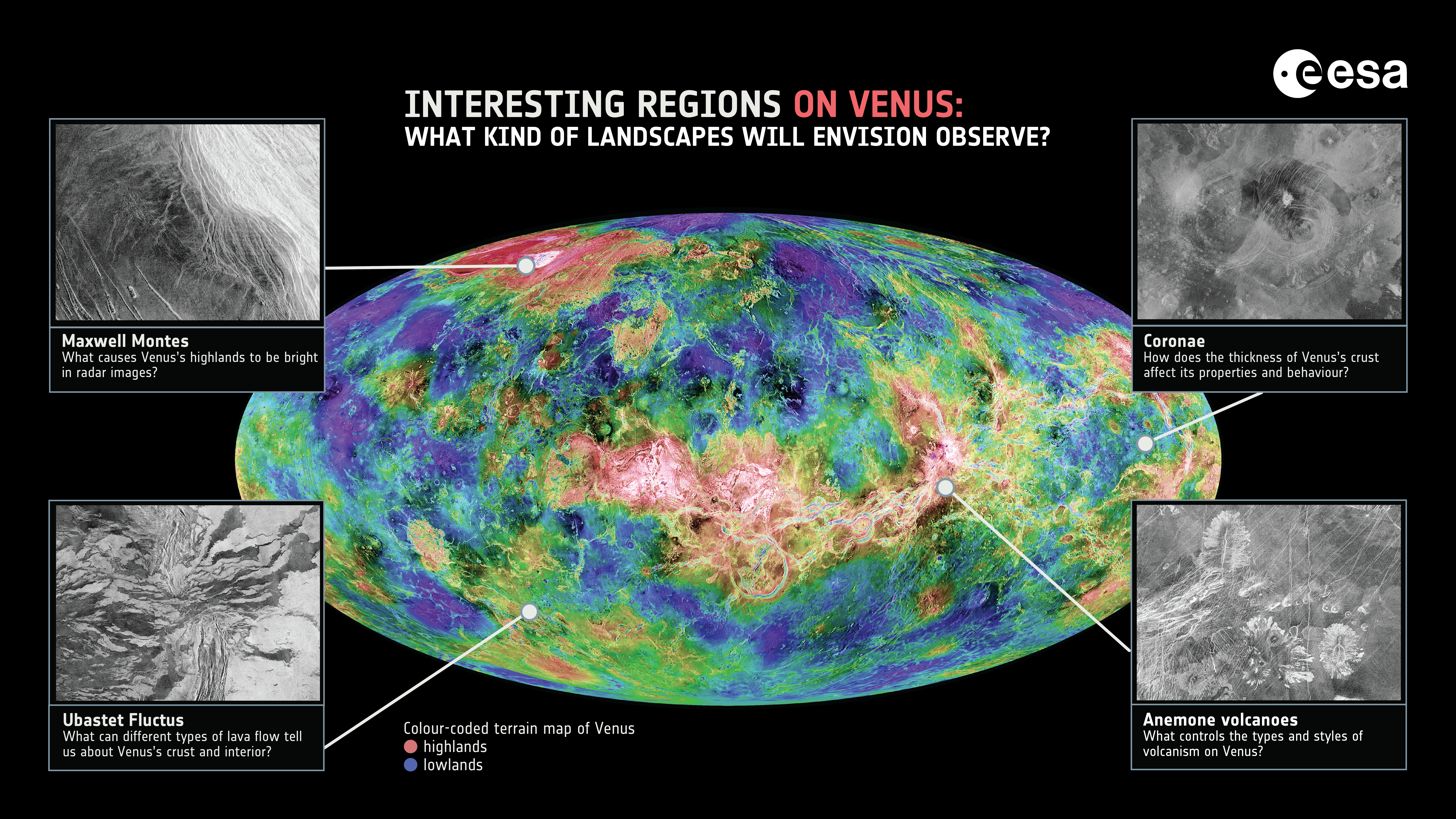
EnVision mission will study Venus's surface with a selection of science instruments to understand why our closest neighbour in space is so different

The payload instruments are contributed by ESA member states, with ASI, DLR, BelSPO, and CNES leading the procurement of SRS, VenSpec-M, VenSpec-H, and VenSpec-U instruments respectively.

=== Venus Subsurface Radar Sounder (SRS) ===
SRS will be a fixed dipole antenna operating in the range 9–30 MHz. SRS will search for subsurface material boundaries in various geological terrains that include impact craters and their infilling, buried craters, tesserae and their edges, plains, lava flows and their edges, and tectonic features to provide stratigraphic relationships at various depth ranges and horizontal scales. The principal investigator of the SRS is Lorenzo Bruzzone, Università di Trento, Italy.

=== Venus Spectroscopy Suite (VenSpec) ===
VenSpec will consist of three channels with a joint science and engineering team: VenSpec-M, VenSpec-H, and VenSpec-U, and a Central Control Unit (CCU). VenSpec-M will provide compositional data on rock types, VenSpec-H will perform high resolution atmospheric measurements, and VenSpec-U will monitor sulfured minor species (mainly SO and SO_{2}), as well as the mysterious UV absorber in the Venusian upper clouds. This suite of instruments will search for temporal variations in surface temperatures, tropospheric concentrations of volcanic gases and clouds, indicative of atmospheric processes and/or surface processes including volcanic eruptions.

The coordinator of the Venus Spectroscopy suite and Instrument Lead Scientist (ILS) of VenSpec-M is Giulia Alemanno (taking over from Jörn Helbert in 2023), DLR Institute of Space Research, Berlin, Germany. The ILS of VenSpec-H is Séverine Robert (taking over from Ann Carine Vandaele in 2023), Royal Belgian Institute for Space Aeronomy (BIRA-IASB), Belgium. The ILS of VenSpec-U is Emmanuel Marcq, LATMOS, IPSL, France.

In March 2025, the company Xenics announced an agreement with DLR to provide short-wave infrared sensors for EnVision's VenSpec-M instrument, as well as for NASA's Venus mission VERITAS. The DLR Institute for Space Research is delivering a similar instrument for both missions (VenSpec-M on EnVision and VEM on VERITAS). The optical subsystem is contributed by CNES and LIRA. The design and assembly integration and verification (AIV) of the optical assembly (VEMO) is subcontracted and under the responsibility of LIRA. The filter assembly within VEMO is managed by CNES, with contributions by Bertin Winlight and CILAS.

VenSpec-H itself is being developed and built by an international consortium of institutes and industrial companies, with OIP in Belgium leading as Prime since 2024 and with oversight by PRODEX and BIRA-IASB. The countries contributing include Belgium, Switzerland, Czech Republic, Spain, Portugal, the Netherlands, Germany, and Finland. The instrument will carry a silhouette of Venus of Vestonice, an Upper Paleolithic ceramic Venus figurine discovered in 1925 in South Moravia and on display at the Moravian Museum in Brno, Czech Republic.

VenSpec-U is mainly developed by a consortium of French public space laboratories (IRAP, LIRA, LATMOS) led by LATMOS, with contributions from Open University in United Kingdom and IAA in Spain[newref6].

The VenSpec Suite's Central Control Unit (CCU) provide shared power, data handling, and command interfaces for the three VenSpec instruments. The CCU is being developed under the responsibility of DLR with significant hardware contributions from MPS, IAA and IDA. The Mauà Institute of Technology will develop the EGSE used to enable efficient interface verification.

=== Radio Science Experiment (VeRSE) ===
Any orbiting spacecraft is sensitive to the local gravity field, plus the gravity field of the Sun and, to a minor extent, other planets. These gravitational perturbations generate spacecraft orbital velocity perturbations, from which the gravity field of a planet can be determined. EnVision's low-eccentricity, near-polar, and relatively low altitude orbit offers the opportunity to obtain a high-resolution gravity field at each longitude and latitude of the Venusian globe.

The analysis of the gravity field together with the topography gives insights on the lithospheric and crustal structure, allowing to better understand Venus's geological evolution. In the absence of seismic data, the measurements of the tidal deformation and proper motion of the planet provide the way to probe its deep internal structure (size and state of the core). The tidal deformation can be measured in the EnVision orbital velocity perturbations through the gravitational potential variations it generates (k2 tidal Love number).

The co-Principal Investigators of EnVision Radio Science and Gravity experiment are Caroline Dumoulin, LPG, Université de Nantes, France, and Pascal Rosenblatt, LPG, Université de Nantes, France.

=== Venus Synthetic Aperture Radar (VenSAR) – cancelled ===
The synthetic aperture radar VenSAR, originally expected to be provided by NASA, would characterise structural and geomorphic evidence of multi-scale processes that shaped the geological history of Venus, as well as characterise current volcanic, tectonic, and sedimentary activity. The instrument would operate at 3.2 GHz in the S-band (9.4 cm wavelength). VenSAR would provide several imaging and ranging techniques from a polar orbit: (1) regional and targeted surface mapping, (2) global topography and altimetry, (3) stereo imaging, (4) surface radiometry and scatterometry, (5) surface polarimetry, (6) repeat pass interferometry opportunities. The principal investigator of the VenSAR was Scott Hensley, JPL.

== See also ==
- Observations and explorations of Venus
- List of missions to Venus
  - Akatsuki, a Japanese Venus orbiter
  - DAVINCI, a NASA orbiter and atmospheric probe
  - Magellan, a NASA Venus orbiter
  - Venus Express, an ESA Venus orbiter
  - VERITAS, a NASA Venus orbiter
  - Venus Orbiter Mission, an ISRO Venus Orbiter.
- Mapping of Venus
- Volcanism on Venus
- List of European Space Agency programmes and missions
