= Long Lived In-situ Solar System Explorer =

NASA payload on the Russian Venera-D mission to Venus

Long Lived In-situ Solar System Explorer (LLISSE) was a possible NASA payload on the Russian Venera-D mission to Venus.

LLISSE was dropped from the Venera-D payload, when following Russia's invasion of Ukraine and the resulting sanctions, Roscosmos chief Dmitry Rogozin announced that continued US participation in Venera-D was “inappropriate", as such, cooperation was cancelled.

== Overview ==
LLISSE uses new materials and heat-resistant electronics that would enable independent operation for about 90 Earth days. This endurance may allow it to obtain periodic measurements of weather data to update global circulation models and quantify near surface atmospheric chemistry variability.

Its anticipated instruments include wind speed/direction sensors, temperature sensors, pressure sensors, and a chemical multi-sensor array. LLISSE is a small 20 cm (7.9 in) cube of about 10 kg (22 lb). The Venera-D lander may carry two LLISSE units; one would be battery-powered (3,000 h), and the other would be wind-powered.
