= Venus Emissivity Mapper =

Spectrometer for mapping the surface composition of Venus

VEM
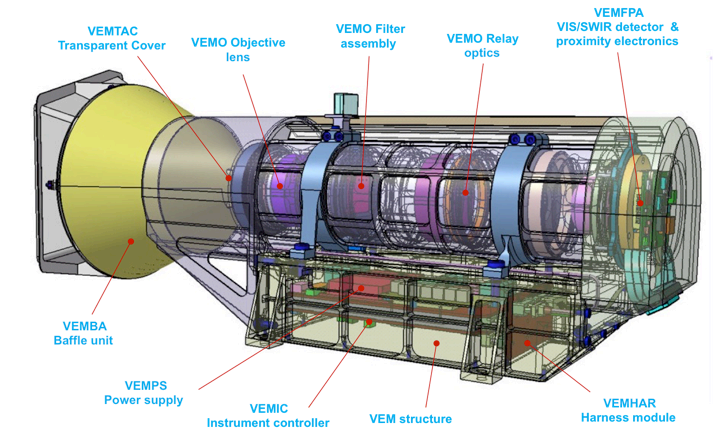
- Detailed design of the Venus Emissivity Mapper
- Operator: DLR
- Manufacturer: DLR
- Instrument type: VIS/NIR spectrometer
- Function: Mapper

Properties
- Resolution: 10 km
- Spectral band: 6 bands between 0.86 and 1.18 μm

Host spacecraft
- Spacecraft: VERITAS and EnVision
- Operator: NASA and ESA
- Launch date: 2028 (planned) and 2031 (planned)

The Venus Emissivity Mapper (VEM) is a spectrometer for mapping the surface composition of Venus through a distinct number of atmospheric spectral windows. It will be one of the two payloads on board the VERITAS mission, and will also be the VenSpec-M channel of the EnVision mission's spectrometer suite.

== Overview ==
While Earth and Venus are similar in many aspects, they evolved very differently and currently have distinct surface and atmospheric environments. Where Earth's surface has liquid water and supports life, Venus experiences a mean surface temperature of over 400 °C, and a carbon dioxide rich atmosphere with a surface pressure of about 92 times that of Earth at sea-level.

Little is known about Venus' surface composition. The dense atmosphere and its cloud layers are mostly opaque to visible and infrared radiation, making remote sensing a challenge. As light travels through the atmosphere, it is attenuated by absorption and scattering, and it is blurred by the emissions of the atmosphere itself. Observations of Venus have shown that the surface can be observed through a number of narrow infrared bands. Using this technique Venus Express was able to observe fresh basalt, pointing towards recent volcanic activity on the surface.

The spectral windows were at the edge of Venus Express' VIRTIS instrument's sensitive spectral range. VIRTIS also experienced thermal drifts and had issues with stray-light. This was because VIRTIS was not designed for ground mapping, yet it allowed for a proof-of-concept leading to VEM's design. VEM will be the first instrument in orbit around Venus focussed solely on these spectral bands, allowing for a complete mapping of the surface composition and surface redox states.

VEM was selected for NASA's VERITAS mission and for ESA's EnVision mission in June 2021. The principal investigator is Jörn Helbert, and the instrument is built by the DLR in Berlin.

== Goal ==
The goal of this instrument is to obtain a full mapping of the rock types, their iron content, and their redox states from orbit. Laboratory measurements have shown that a 4% difference in relative emissivity is sufficient to distinguish between the different rock types, and potentially identify their weathering states. This is thus the design driver for the instrument. An identification of the ground composition based on measured spectra is only possible once a spectral library representing the surface conditions of Venus is available, which has been in the works at the Planetary Spectroscopy Laboratory at DLR. By continuously monitoring the surface, it will be possible to further constrain the current volcanic activity. In addition to that, any surface information will contribute towards understanding the past evolution of Venus leading up to its current state.

== Description ==
=== History and heritage ===
Spectral windows have been used by several space-based (Venus Express, Galileo and Cassini) and ground-based missions to study Venus. While these mostly represented proof of concepts, they gave rise to the idea for the Venus Emissivity Mapper, which is building on the flight heritage of all the aforementioned missions, especially so on VIRTIS and VMC aboard Venus Express. VEM was first put forward as part of the EnVision mission proposal in 2010. At the same time, the first Venus-analogue measurements began surfacing, making it possible to derive surface compositions from the measured Venus emissivities. EnVision's initial proposal was not accepted, and so the design was iterated upon so that a new proposal could be made in 2014 and again in 2016. ESA selected it for an in-depth design study in 2018 and three years later, ESA declared EnVision — with VEM (VenSpec-M) aboard — the fifth M-class Cosmic Vision mission.

The Venus Emissivity Mapper was also submitted to the NASA Discovery Program as part of the VERITAS proposal in 2014. It was initially selected for Phase A funding but not chosen for flight. In 2019, an updated proposal was submitted to the Discovery Program, once more receiving Phase A funding. Two years later, in June 2021, the announcement about VERITAS' official selection was made public.

Building onto the heritage of previous missions, all subsystems have a TRL level of at least 6, thereby giving VEM an overall TRL of 6.

=== Science ===
Observations will be made at night measuring the emissivity signal from the surface.

Typically, igneous rocks are identified by their sodium, potassium, and silicon content. However these elements lack observable features in the 1 μm spectral band. Instead, transition metals (primarily Fe), and their spectral features in the relevant windows, will be used to characterise the surface composition. This map of iron content will then, with topological data, be used to generate a map of inferred rock types.

In order for these measurements to be absolute rather than relative, the measurements are to be calibrated using the data gathered by the Venera landers when overflying their landings zones.

=== Design ===
VEM is a multispectral imaging instrument, operating as a pushbroom scanner. It consists of the following subsystems: The optical sub-system (VEMO), the Instrument Controller (VEMIC), the power supply (VEMPS), and the two-stage baffle (VEMBA). The development approach is analogue to what was successfully done when designing MERTIS. This means that one starts with a breadboard, moves on to a lab prototype, follows that up by an engineering prototype, and finally reaches the full qualification model. Along the way, risks are constantly identified and mitigated.

==== Optics (VEMO) ====
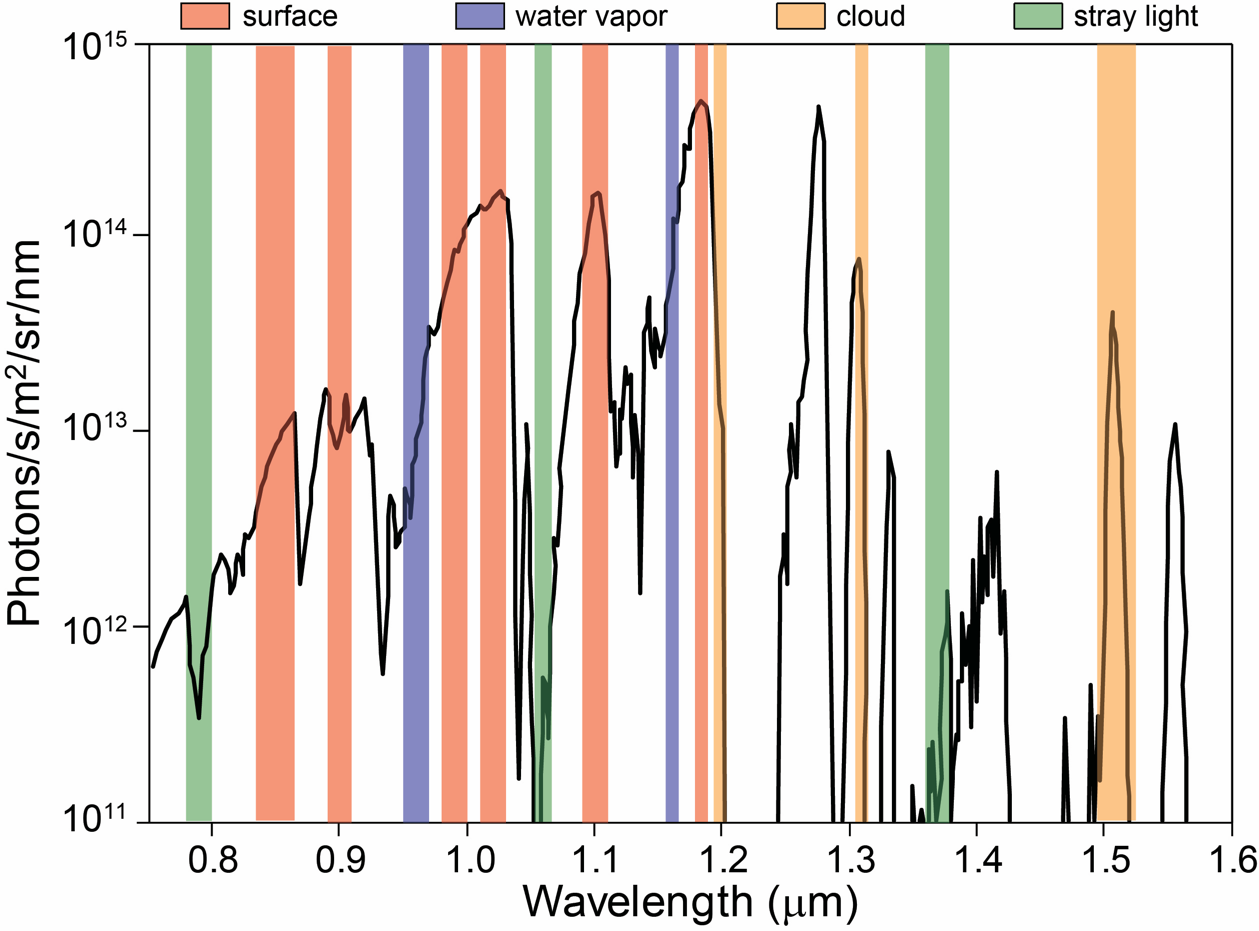
The measurement bands used for the Venus Emissivity Mapper to take advantage of the gaps in the CO₂ atmosphere of Venus.

The optics sub-system is a three lens system, provided by LESIA, Observatoire de Paris, France. First, a telescope with an aperture of 8 mm and a focal length of 40.5 mm projects the scene on the filter array. From there, it is then imaged on the focal plane through two more lenses with a combined magnification factor of 0.4. The optics have a total transmittance of 0.88, not taking into account the filters. The focal plane array (VEMFPA) consists of a Xenics XSW-640 InGaAs detector, which has a resolution of 640x512 pixel, a FOV of 30°×45°, a pixel pitch of 20 μm, and a pixel FOV of 0.07°×0.07°. The imaging electronics unit used is LM98640QML-SP from Texas Instruments. InGaAs detectors have been used in deep space successfully over many years, making it a safe choice. This specific unit is currently in use on the ExoMars Trace Gas Orbiter.

The filter array is provided by CNES Toulouse, France. Narrow-band filters takes care of only transmitting the spectral region of interest. Based on the 4% relative emissivity that is needed to differentiate between the different rock types, the signal-to-noise ratio (SNR) for each band is derived by running the respective radiative transfer model. The bands and their required SNRs are found in the following table:

Spectral bands and their required SNRs to fulfill the 4% requirement
Purpose	Mineralogy						Clouds			Water		Stray Light		
Center Wavelength nm	860	910	990	1020	1110	1180	1195	1310	1510	960	1150	790	1060	1370
Width	40	60	30	15	20	12	12	30	30	40	30	?	?	?
Target SNR dB	53	53	44	43	145	125	134	134	134	100	100	0	0	0

==== Instrument controller (VEMIC) ====
The instrument controller is the interface between the internal units and the spacecraft. It handles and processes all the data, and controls the subsystem. The system used in VEM is taken from MERTIS, with only the interfaces needing adaptation to comply with VEM.

==== Power system (VEMPS) ====
The main power draw is coming from the focal plane array and the instrument controller. This sub-system is heavily based upon the MERTIS PSU, as the latter is already flight-proven. The main part of the PS is a DC/DC converter from the Interpoint SMRT series, which is supplemented by external LC-filters and some additional specialised circuitry.

==== Baffle (VEMBA) ====
To keep stray- and sunlight out, a two-stage baffle is employed. The front part is mainly a screen to protect the spacecraft, while the back part is the one taking care of the stray-light. The baffle aims to reduce stray light to a factor of at least 10^{−5}.

=== Signal optimisations ===
==== Atmospheric effects ====
When looking at the spectral bands presented earlier, one can see that next to the six bands used for mineralogical measurements, eight more are present. Those additional bands are used to correct for the various effects altering the signal between the surface of Venus and the measuring spacecraft. By measuring the atmosphere on its own, the effects of it and the varying conditions it introduces can be considered. The same is done for stray-light, for which three dedicated channels are used.

==== Signal-to-noise ratio ====
As the integration time for a satellite in orbit can hardly be optimised, a few other techniques are applied to get the highest possible signal-to-noise performance. Those improvements are:

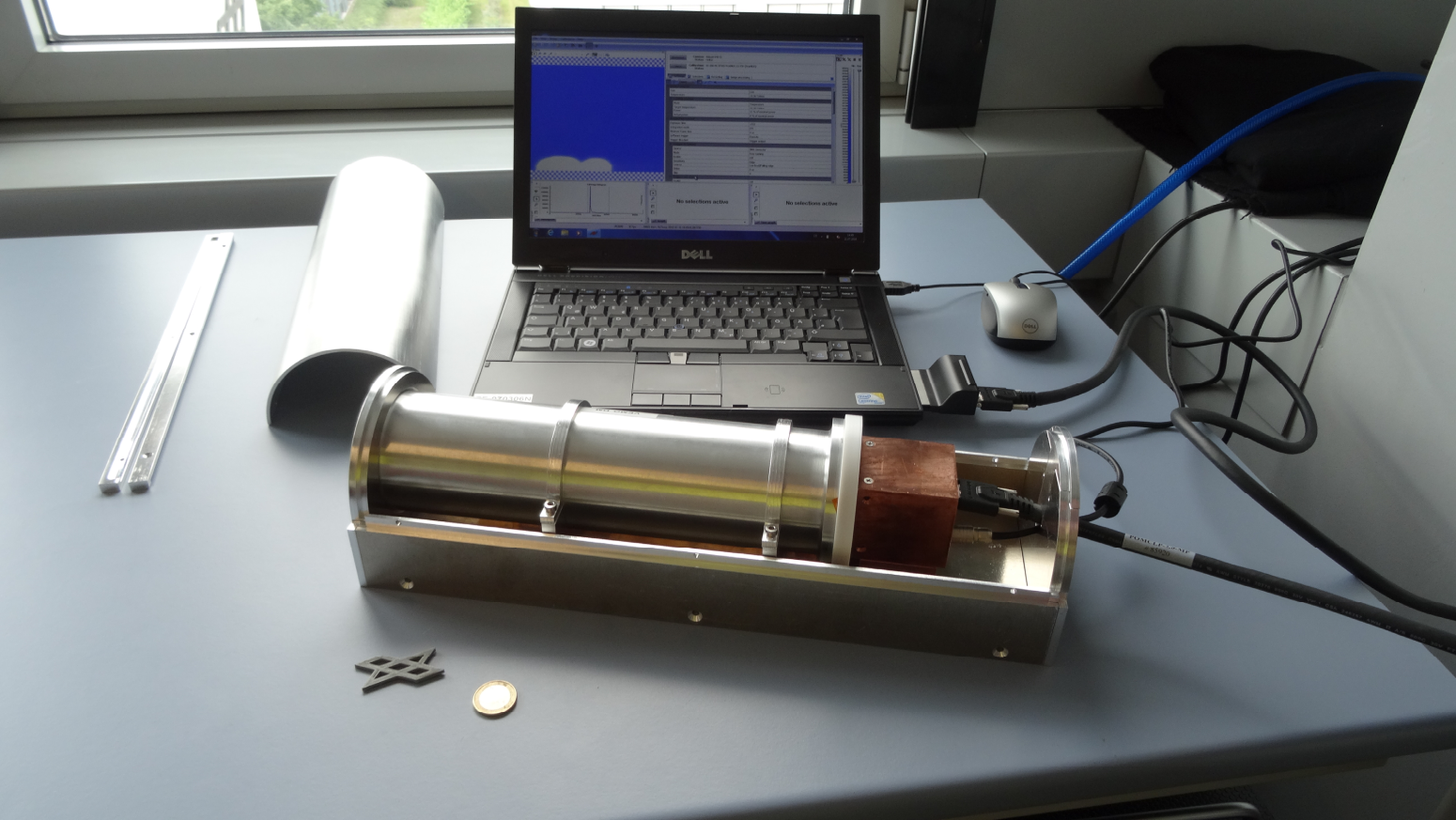
The laboratory prototype of the Venus Emissivity Mapper instrument.

- Oversampling during one dwell time (for slow orbits)
- Discrete Time-Delayed Integration (TDI)
- Spatial binning (macro-pixels)

Once applied, even for an orbit altitude of 8000 km, the SNR required to reach the necessary accuracy is theoretically attained with margins of more than 100% for all bands. For orbit altitudes around 250 km, the SNR is close to 10 times better than the one obtained at 8000 km. A laboratory prototype showed potential for a later SNR performance of well over 1000.

==== Reducing uncertainties ====
By optimising the detector for the relevant wavelengths, and by making use of the additional spectral ranges, the effects of atmosphere and stray-light are accounted for, thereby significantly lowering the uncertainty in the measurements — as described above. The uncertainties are further reduced by having an overlapping ground coverage (to take care of short-term atmospheric variability), and repeated measurements (to reduce error due to uncertainty in water vapour content, cloud opacity, and surface window radiance).
