= VERITAS (spacecraft) =

Planned NASA orbiter mission to Venus

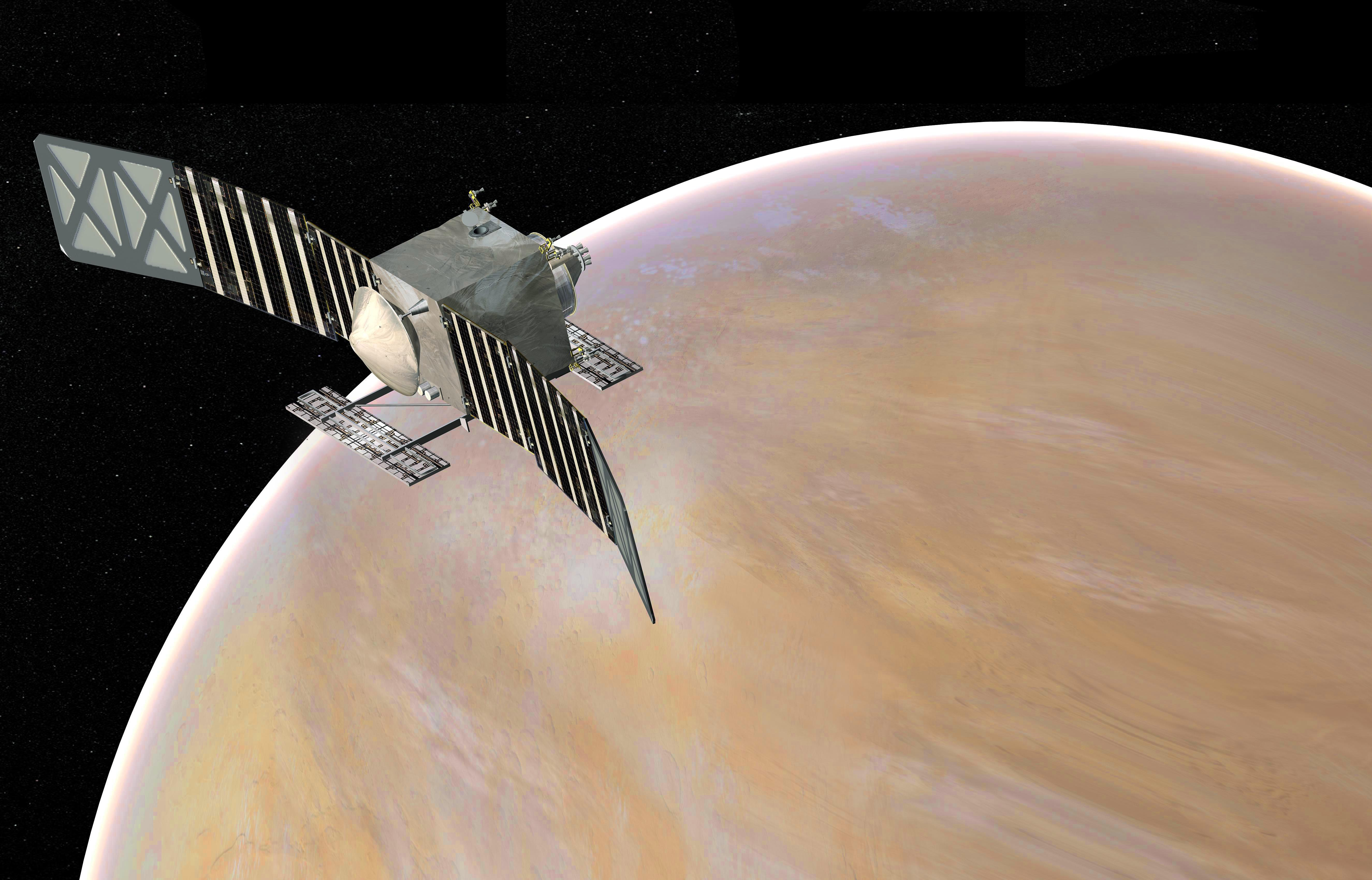
- Illustration of the VERITAS spacecraft in orbit around Venus
- Mission type: Venus orbiter
- Operator: NASA / JPL
- Website: science.nasa.gov
- Mission duration: Planned: 3 years

Spacecraft properties
- Manufacturer: Lockheed Martin
- Power: 5,900 watts

Start of mission
- Launch date: November 2032 (planned)

Orbital parameters
- Reference system: Cytherocentric
- Pericytherion altitude: 400 km (250 mi)
- Period: 1.6 hours
Instruments
- VEM: Venus Emissivity Mapper
- VISAR: Venus Interferometric Synthetic Aperture Radar
- DSAC-2: Deep Space Atomic Clock-2

VERITAS (Venus Emissivity, Radio Science, InSAR, Topography, and Spectroscopy) is an upcoming mission from NASA's Jet Propulsion Laboratory (JPL) to map the surface of the planet Venus in high resolution. The combination of topography, near-infrared spectroscopy, and radar image data will provide knowledge of Venus's tectonic and impact history, gravity, geochemistry, the timing and mechanisms of volcanic resurfacing, and the mantle processes responsible for them.

On 4 November 2022, NASA announced the postponement of the mission launch from 2027 to 2031, citing institutional problems at JPL delaying the launch of Psyche. The mission's Principal Investigator Suzanne Smrekar counterproposed a November 2029 launch date, which she argued would require only modest "bridge" funding and compared to the 2031 option would offer lower overall cost and fewer conflicts with DAVINCI and EnVision; this position obtained endorsement by a Congressional committee in October 2023. In November 2024, Smrekar stated that the mission was aiming to launch in June 2031. By 2026, the planned launch date was November 2032.

== Proposal history ==
VERITAS was one of dozens of proposals submitted in 2015 to potentially become the 13th mission of NASA’s Discovery Program. Suzanne Smrekar of NASA's Jet Propulsion Laboratory (JPL) would serve as the principal investigator, and JPL would be the managing agency. On 30 September 2015, VERITAS was selected as one of five finalists. On 4 January 2017, two other proposals to study small bodies, Lucy and Psyche, were selected as the 13th and 14th Discovery missions, respectively.

VERITAS was again proposed for the Discovery Program in 2019, and was selected for Phase A funding on 13 February 2020. On 2 June 2021, it was selected, along with DAVINCI+, to fly as one of the next Discovery missions. Each mission will get approximately US$500 million in funding. VERITAS was originally planned to be launched between the years 2028 and 2030. However, work on the mission was put on hold in November 2022, and the launch was delayed by at least three years (to no earlier than 2031), after an independent review of the Psyche mission found significant institutional issues at NASA and JPL. The FY2024 budget request for VERITAS at $1.5M, released in March 2023, represented a near-complete freeze of the mission attested to be "functionally a soft cancellation". This has been reverted in the FY24 bill released March 3, requesting NASA seek sufficient funding for the VERITAS Venus mission to enable a launch by the end of the decade.

== Mission ==
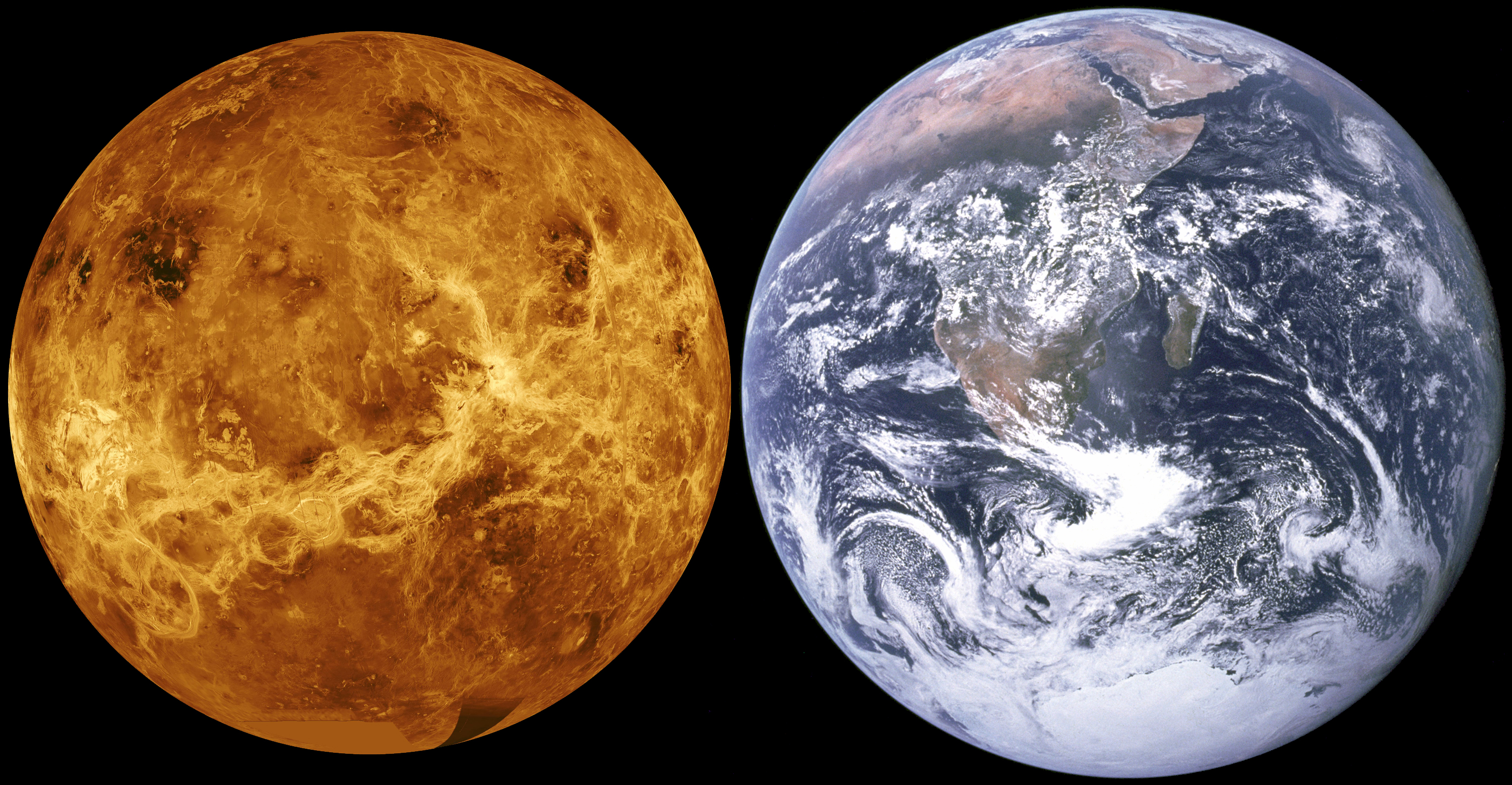
Venus is roughly the same size as Earth, but has a drastically different climate and surface

VERITAS will gather data to help scientists to answer three primary questions about Venus:

1. How has its geology evolved over time?
2. What geologic processes are currently operating on it?
3. Has water been present on or near its surface?

Understanding Venus's geology is of significant scientific interest because of its similarities to Earth. Venus's size, age, and composition are all broadly similar to Earth's, but its environment is significantly different and less hospitable to life. Understanding Venus's geologic evolution therefore will help answer questions about the formation of planets hospitable to life. A key step in developing an understanding of this evolution is an investigation of Venus's current geology. Current data is highly suggestive of recent and active volcanism on Venus, but the extent of this volcanic activity is not completely known. Moreover, it is unknown to what degree surface water was historically present on Venus and what role subsurface water plays in Venus's modern geology.

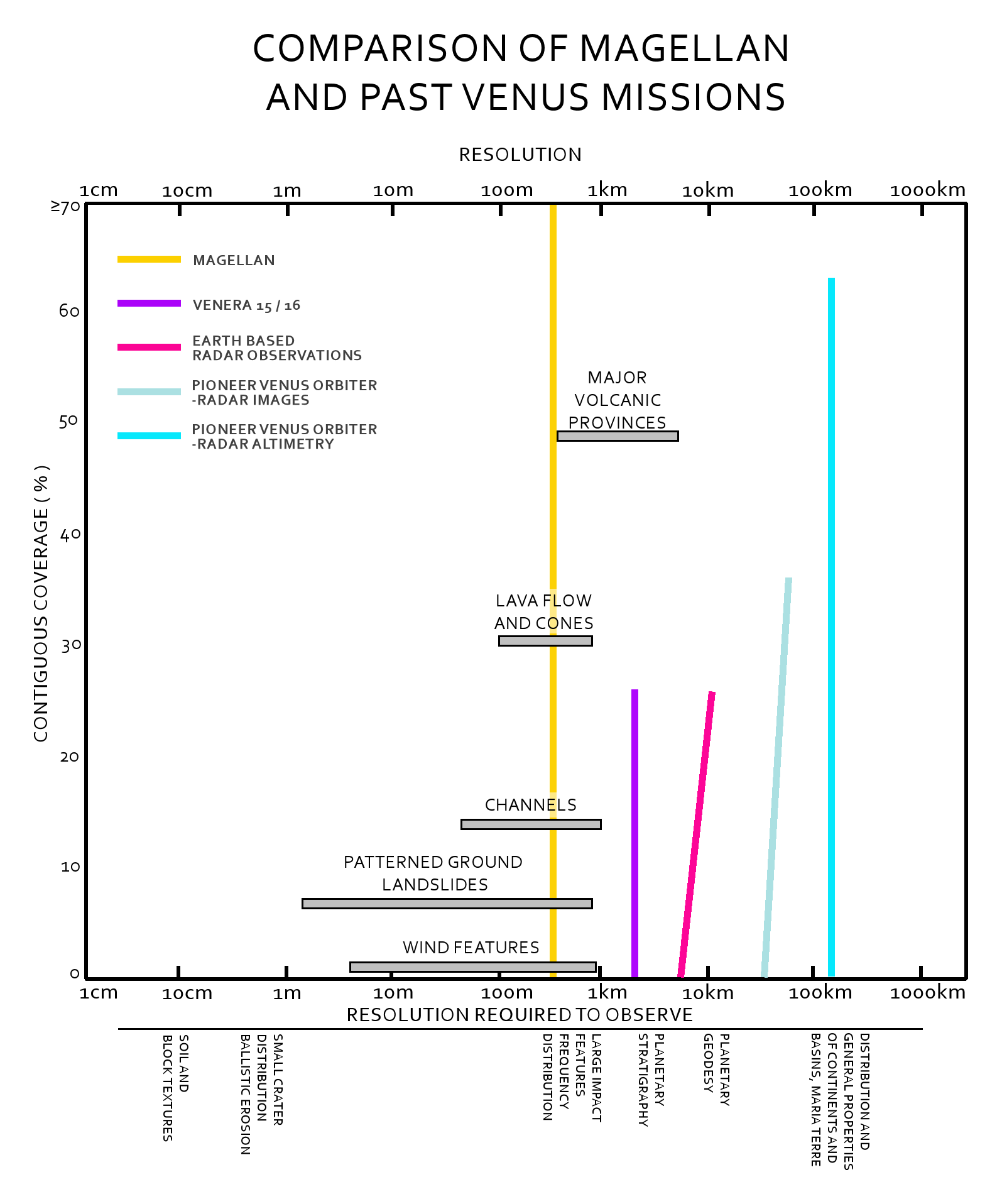
A comparison of past surface-imaging missions to Venus, of which Magellan is the most recent

VERITAS will collect data to help answer these questions in several ways. High-resolution imagery will be obtained using an X-band radar configured as a single pass interferometric synthetic aperture radar (InSAR). This radar data will be coupled with a multispectral near-infrared (NIR) emissivity mapping capability. VERITAS will map surface topography with a spatial resolution of 250m and 5m vertical accuracy, and generate radar imagery with 30m spatial resolution. This high-resolution imaging data will allow scientists to locate active volcanic eruptions, to understand the age and composition of features on the planet's surface, and better understand the planet's overall geology. The spacecraft's communication system will also be used to perform a gravity science experiment to investigate variations in Venus's gravitational field. The spacecraft's telecom system will be used to map gravity strength at Venus's surface, providing a uniform resolution of better than 160 km. The data will provide an estimate of Venus's core size and information about topographic features that lie underneath the planet's surface.

== Instruments ==
VERITAS is designed to produce global, high-resolution topography and imaging of Venus's surface and produce the first maps of deformation and global surface composition, thermal emissivity, and gravity fields. Onboard the spacecraft will be two scientific instruments, the Venus Emissivity Mapper (VEM) and Venus Interferometric Synthetic Aperture Radar (VISAR).

- VEM (Venus Emissivity Mapper) is designed to map the surface emissivity using six spectral bands in five atmospheric windows that see through the clouds. It will be built by the German Aerospace Center (DLR). VEM also carries eight atmospheric bands for calibration and detection of near-surface water vapor.
- VISAR (Venus Interferometric Synthetic Aperture Radar) is designed to generate global data sets for topography (250 m horizontal by 5 m vertical accuracy – compare to Magellan which had 50 km spatial and 100 m vertical resolution) and SAR imaging at 30 m resolution with targeted resolution at 15 m. VERITAS will create the first planetary active surface deformation map (1.5 cm vertical).

In addition to these two instruments, the spacecraft will also carry the Deep Space Atomic Clock-2 as a secondary payload. The Deep Space Atomic Clock-2 is the successor to the Deep Space Atomic Clock payload flown on the STP-2 mission in June 2019, and is intended to provide highly precise timing for deep space missions.

== See also ==
- List of missions to Venus
  - Magellan, the most recent previous NASA mission dedicated to Venus (1989-1993)
  - DAVINCI, a Venus atmospheric probe, selected alongside VERITAS for the Discovery program
  - EnVision, an ESA mission to Venus with NASA participation in the same timeframe
  - Venus Orbiter Mission, an ISRO mission to Venus in the same timeframe.
