= Laboratoire atmosphères, milieux, observations spatiales =

French research laboratory

- Type: research laboratory
- Website: http://www.latmos.ipsl.fr

The Laboratoire atmosphères, milieux, observations spatiales (LATMOS) is a French research laboratory of the University of Versailles - Paris-Saclay University and Sorbonne University specialized in the study of the physical and chemical processes of the Earth's atmosphere, the study of planets and small bodies of the Solar System (atmospheres, surfaces, sub-surfaces) as well as the physics of the heliosphere, the exosphere of the planets and the plasmas of the Solar System. It employs 230 people.

On January 24, 2021, Latmos launches its first nano-satellite: UVSQ-SAT.
