= DAVINCI =

Planned Venus atmospheric probe

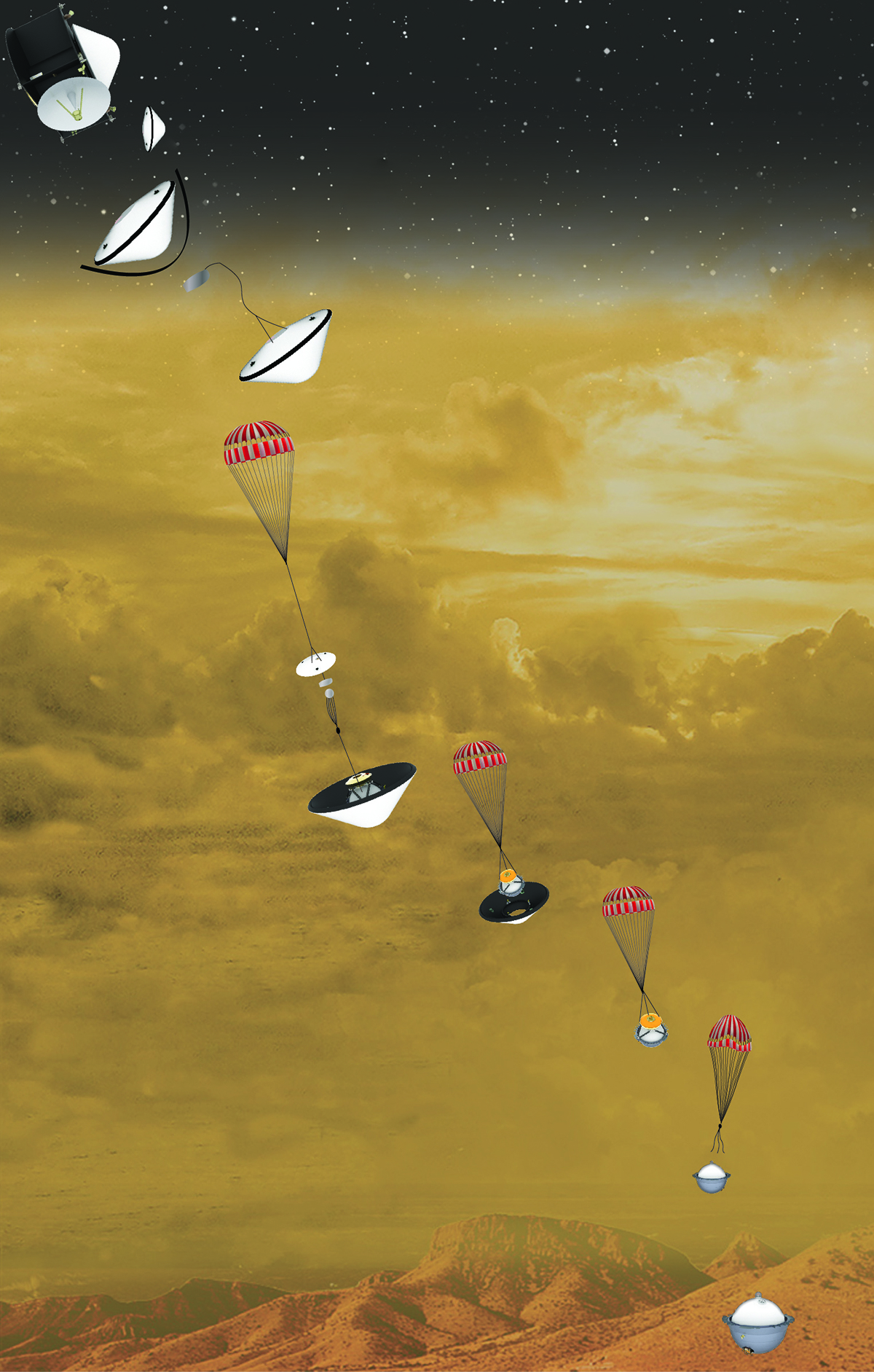
- Artist's concept of DAVINCI's descent stages
- Names: DAVINCI (2015–2019); DAVINCI+ (2019–2021); DAVINCI (2021–)
- Mission type: Orbiter and Atmospheric probe
- Operator: NASA / Goddard
- Website: ssed.gsfc.nasa.gov

Spacecraft properties
- Spacecraft: Orbiter; Probe
- Manufacturer: Lockheed Martin / Goddard Space Flight Center

Start of mission
- Launch date: December 2030

End of mission
- Landing date: 2033
- Landing site: Alpha Regio

Venus orbiter
- Spacecraft component: Orbiter
- Orbital insertion: 2034–2035

Venus atmospheric probe
- Spacecraft component: Probe
- Atmospheric entry: 2034–2035
Instruments
- VASI: Venus Atmospheric Structure Investigation
- VenDI: Venus Descent Imager
- VISOR: Venus Imaging System for Observational Reconnaissance
- VMS: Venus Mass Spectrometer
- VTLS: Venus Tunable Laser Spectrometer
- VfOx: Venus Oxygen Fugacity
- CUVIS: Compact Ultraviolet to Visible Imaging Spectrometer

DAVINCI (Deep Atmosphere Venus Investigation of Noble gases, Chemistry, and Imaging) is a planned mission for an orbiter and atmospheric probe to the planet Venus. Together with the separate VERITAS mission, which will also study Venus, it was selected by NASA on June 2, 2021, to be part of their Discovery Program. Its acronym is inspired by Leonardo da Vinci in honor of his scientific innovations, aerial sketches and constructions.

DAVINCI will send both an orbiter and a descent probe to Venus. The orbiter will image Venus in multiple wavelengths from above, while the descent probe will study the chemical composition of Venus's atmosphere and take photographs during descent. The DAVINCI probe will travel through the Venusian atmosphere, sampling the atmosphere, and returning measurements down to the surface. These measurements are important to understanding the origin of the atmosphere, how it has evolved, and how and why it is different from the atmosphere of Earth and Mars. The measurements taken by DAVINCI will investigate the possible history of water on Venus and the chemical processes at work in the unexplored lower atmosphere. Before it reaches the surface, the DAVINCI probe will capture high-resolution images of the planet's ridged terrain ("tesserae"), returning the first images of the planet's surface since the Soviet Venera 14 lander in 1982. It will also collect data for studying the planet's origin and its tectonic and weathering history.

== Proposal development ==
DAVINCI was one of the dozens of proposals submitted in 2015 to potentially become Mission #13 of NASA's Discovery Program. NASA's planned budget for Discovery Mission #13 was US$450 million. On September 30, 2015, DAVINCI was selected as one of five finalists. On January 4, 2017, two competing proposals, Lucy and Psyche, defeated DAVINCI to be selected as the 13th and 14th Discovery missions, respectively.

The DAVINCI proposal was revised and resubmitted under the name "DAVINCI+" for the Discovery Program in 2019, and selected for Phase A funding on February 13, 2020. Its Concept Study Report was submitted in November 2020. In June 2021, NASA selected DAVINCI+ as one of the next Discovery class missions. The mission's name was reverted to DAVINCI after selection.

The DAVINCI Principal Investigator is James B. Garvin of NASA's Goddard Space Flight Center (GSFC) and the Deputy Principal Investigators are Stephanie Getty and Giada Arney, both also of GSFC.

A separate Venus orbiter mission, VERITAS, was selected at the same time, with the objective of mapping the surface features of Venus with radar to shed light on its history, evaluate the possibility of plate tectonics and volcanism, and understand how the planet developed so differently from Earth.

== Objectives ==
Following five orbital missions to Venus (Venera 15, Venera 16, Magellan, Venus Express, and Akatsuki) focused on remote sensing observations, DAVINCI will be the first probe to enter the atmosphere of Venus since the Soviet Vega probes in 1985, and the first atmospheric probe by NASA since the Pioneer Venus Multiprobe mission in 1978. DAVINCI will make direct measurements in the lower two-thirds of the atmospheric mass.

DAVINCI scientists will explore how Venus's atmosphere formed and then changed over time, including what happened to the water that is thought to have once existed on the planet. The findings will help scientists understand why Venus and Earth took such different paths as they matured, and provide another point of comparison for studies of rocky exoplanets.

DAVINCI's in situ measurements of the atmosphere will answer multiple questions regarding Venus's atmospheric composition as currently formulated for the National Research Council Planetary Science Decadal Survey's Venus In Situ Explorer (VISE).

The descent probe is not intended to operate once it touches down on the surface of Venus. However, there is a chance it might survive the impact at around 25 miles per hour (12 meters per second). In that case its instruments could continue operation for up to 18 minutes under ideal conditions.

=== Goals ===
- Understand the origin of the Venusian atmosphere, how it has evolved, and how and why it is different from the atmospheres of Earth and Mars.
- Investigate the possibility of an ocean in Venus's past and the chemical processes at work in the lower Venusian atmosphere.
- Obtain high-resolution pictures of the geological features (tesserae) of Venus, which will help to assess whether Venus has plate tectonics, and better understand how terrestrial planets are formed.

== Scientific payload ==
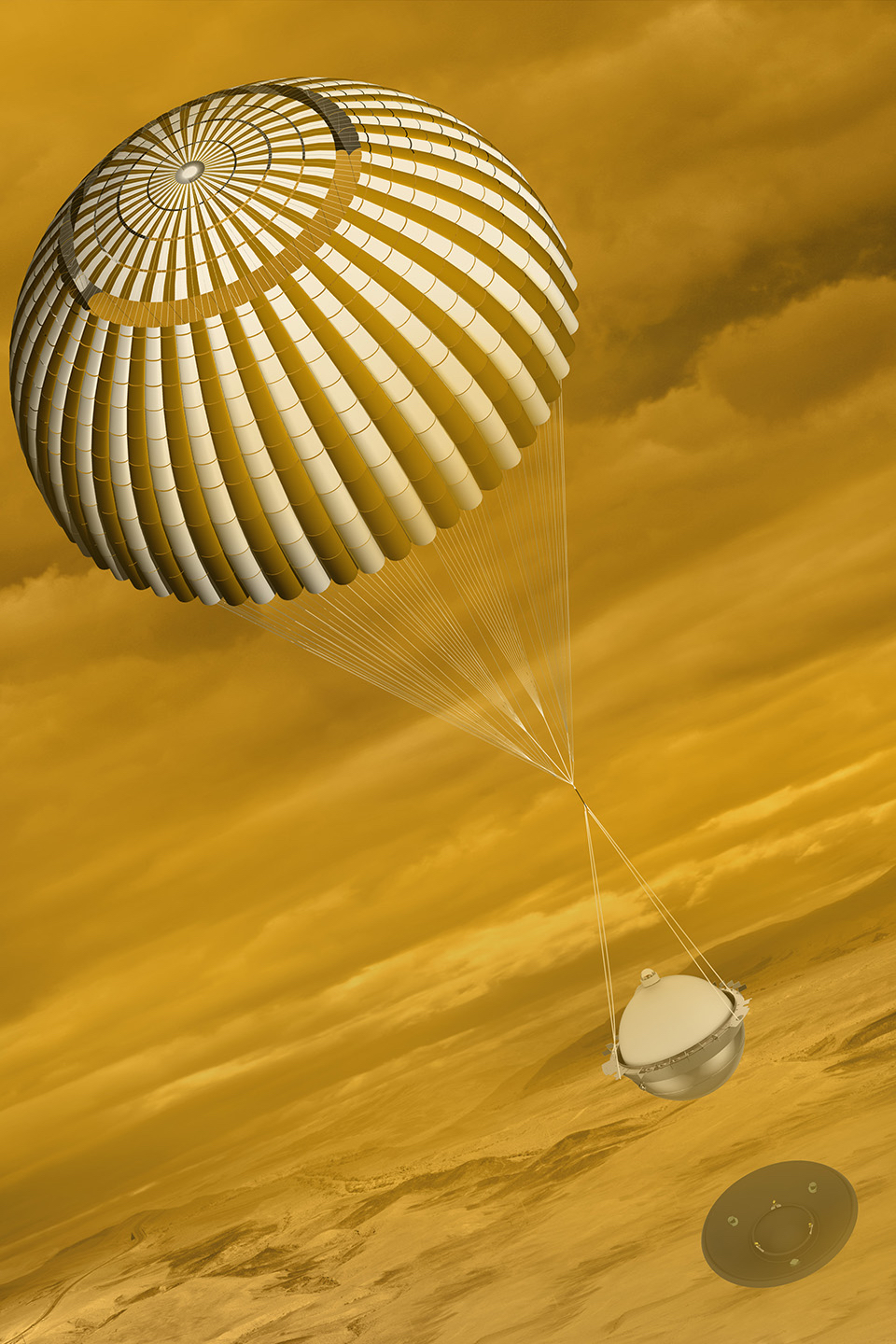
During its 63-minute descent, DAVINCI will collect and return measurements of Venus's atmospheric composition.

DAVINCI is designed to address high-priority NASA decadal science by targeting noble gases, trace gases, and their isotopes, as well as temperature, pressure, winds, and imaging at Venus.

=== Descent probe instruments ===
An engineering model of the descent probe

On the descent probe, DAVINCI's Venus Analytic Laboratory (VAL) instruments will provide high-fidelity synergistic measurements throughout the probe's descent, particularly in the upper clouds and the unexplored near-surface environment. VAL design is based on the Sample Analysis at Mars (SAM) instrument on the Curiosity rover, which measured the chemical and isotopic composition of the Martian atmosphere and found the first definitive evidence of organics on Mars. DAVINCI's four science instruments are:

==== Venus Mass Spectrometer (VMS) ====
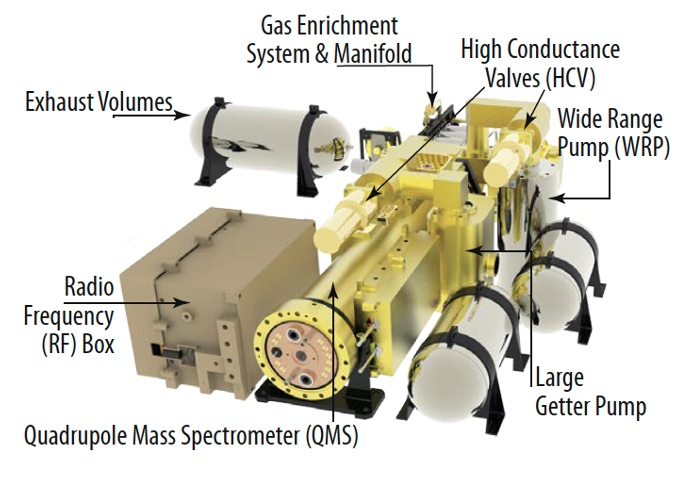
Components of the Venus Mass Spectrometer (VMS) instrument to be installed in the atmospheric probe. The job of VMS is to sample gas during the probe's descent, analyze it, and provide us with information about the chemical composition of the Venusian atmosphere and possible connections to surface mineralogies.

Proposed to be built by NASA's Goddard Space Flight Center (GSFC), VMS will provide the first comprehensive in situ surveys of noble and trace gases at Venus, and has the capability to discover new gas species in the Venusian atmosphere. VMS is similar to Curiosity's quadrupole mass spectrometer (QMS).

==== Venus Tunable Laser Spectrometer (VTLS) ====
Proposed to be built by NASA's Jet Propulsion Laboratory (JPL), VTLS will provide the first highly sensitive in situ measurements of targeted trace gases and associated isotope ratios at Venus, addressing key science questions about chemical processes in the upper clouds and the near-surface environment. VTLS is similar to Curiosity's tunable laser spectrometer (TLS).

==== Venus Atmospheric Structure Investigation (VASI) ====
Proposed to be built by GSFC using flight-proven sensors, and led by Ralph Lorenz and Dave Atkinson of the Applied Physics Laboratory and JPL respectively, VASI will provide measurements of the structure and dynamics of the Venusian atmosphere during entry and descent, providing context for chemistry measurements and enabling reconstruction of the probe's descent.

==== Venus Descent Imager (VenDI) ====
To be built by Malin Space Science Systems (MSSS), VenDI will provide high-contrast images of the tessera terrain at the descent location. VenDI is similar to Curiosity's Mast Camera (Mastcam), Mars Descent Imager (MarDI), and Mars Hand Lens Imager (MAHLI).

=== Orbiter instruments ===
On the orbiter, a multi-spectral camera with narrow- and wide-angle modes will image the planet in the UV and the 1-micron near-infrared band. The imaging will be done during two Venus flybys before the probe deployment, followed by an orbital remote sensing phase to complement the descent probe.

== See also ==
- EnVision, a Venus orbiter selected by ESA with NASA participation
- Galileo orbiter's Jupiter atmospheric probe
- Venera, a series of Soviet probes and landers
- Pioneer Venus Multiprobe
