= Condor (disambiguation) =

Condor is the common name for two species of birds.

Condor, CONDOR, El Condor, or The Condor may also refer to:

== Arts, entertainment and media ==
=== Fictional entities ===
- Condor (comics), in Marvel Comics
- Condor, a starship in The Invincible by Stanislaw Lem, 1964
- The Condors, villains of El Eternauta: tercera parte
- Captain Condor, British comic character

=== Film and television ===
- El Condor (film), a 1970 Western
- The Condor (film), a 2007 animated superhero film
- Condor (TV series)

=== Literature ===
- Condor, a 1984 novel by Graham Masterton
- Cóndor (newspaper), a German-language newspaper in Chile
- The Condor journal, now Ornithological Applications

=== Other uses in arts, entertainment and media ===
- Condor (ride), an amusement ride
- El Condor (roller coaster), at Walibi Holland
- The Condor, 1986 album by Steve Lacy

== Businesses and organisations ==
See also § Transportation

- Condor SA, a Swiss manufacturer of bicycles and motorcycles
- Condor Club, an early strip club in San Francisco, California, US
- Condor Cycles, a British bicycle manufacturer
- Condor Electronics, an Algerian consumer electronics manufacturer
- Condor Films, a Swiss film and TV production company
- Condor Tecnologias Não-Letais, a Brazilian defence company

== People ==
- Condor of Cornwall (fl. 1066), legendary Cornish nobleman
- Condor Laucke (1914–1993), Australian politician
- Frank Cóndor (born 1984), Spanish tennis player
- Javier Cóndor (born 1960), Costa Rican judoka
- Lana Condor (born 1997), American actress
- Sam Condor (born 1949), politician of Saint Kitts and Nevis
- Mat Hoffman (born 1972), American BMX rider nicknamed "The Condor"
- Kevin Mitnick (1963-2023), American hacker turned computer security consultant nicknamed "The Condor"
- Carlos Manuel Hoo Ramírez (born 1978), Mexican drug trafficker, alias "El Cóndor"

== Places ==
- Condor, Rio Grande do Sul, Brazil, a municipality
- Condor, Alberta, Canada, a hamlet
- Condor Peninsula, Palmer Land, Antarctica
- El Cóndor, Jujuy, Argentina, a town
- Condor (mountain), in the Andes in Peru
- Cerro El Cóndor, a stratovolcano in Argentina
- Condor Peak, a mountain in California, US
- Condor Seamount, a submarine mountain
- Cordillera del Cóndor, a mountain range in the Andes

== Science and technology ==
- CONDOR secure cell phone
- Condor, a pan–tilt–zoom camera manufactured by Flock Safety
- HTCondor, a computing software framework
- IBM Condor, a 2023 computer quantum processor
- Moto E (1st generation), an Android smartphone code-named Condor

== Military ==
=== Aviation ===
- Condor (Argentine missile)
- AGM-53 Condor, a US Navy missile project
- Antonov An-124 Ruslan, a Ukrainian/Soviet aircraft, NATO reporting name "Condor"
- Boeing Condor, a test unmanned aerial vehicle
- Curtiss B-2 Condor, a 1920s American bomber
- Curtiss T-32 Condor II, a 1930s American biplane
- Focke-Wulf Fw 200 Condor, a German World War II bomber
- HMH-464, a US Marine Corps helicopter squadron known as "Condors"
- Schweizer RU-38 Twin Condor, an American reconnaissance aircraft
- Condor, a US Coast Guard version of the BQM-147 Dragon unmanned aerial vehicle
- Condor Field, an airbase in California in World War II and the Korean War

=== Ships ===
- Condor-class gunvessel, Royal Navy, 1876–87
- Condor-class sloop, Royal Navy, 1898–1900
- HMS Condor, the name of several Royal Navy ships and shore establishments
- SMS Condor, an Imperial German Navy cruiser
- SMS Condor, an 1886 Schichau-class torpedo boat
- USS Condor, the name of several US Navy minesweepers

=== Other military uses ===
- Condor (APC), a German armoured personnel carrier
- Condor A350, a Swiss military motorcycle
- Condor Legion, a Nazi unit in the Spanish Civil War
- Operation Condor (disambiguation), several uses
- RM Condor, a Royal Marines base in Scotland

== Sports ==
- Condor (golf), a score of four under par
- Condor BC, a Cameroonian basketball club
- SC Condor Hamburg, a German football club
- Club El Condor, later Bogotá F.C., a Colombian football club
- Bakersfield Condors, in the American Hockey League
  - Bakersfield Condors (1998–2015), in the East Coast Hockey League
- Jonquière Condors, Canadian former ice hockey team
- Pittsburgh Condors, a former US basketball team

== Transportation ==
=== Air ===
- Condor (airline), Germany
- Condor Group, the aviation unit of the Mexico City Police
- Condor Syndikat, a German trade company that operated airline services in Brazil
- ADI Condor, an American motor glider
- Aero Cóndor, a Peruvian airline
- Castel C.34 Condor, a 1934 French sailplane
- Curtiss Model 53 Condor, a 1929 civil passenger version of the Model 52 Condor bomber
- Davis-Costin Condor, a British sailplane, 1953
- Druine Condor, a French 1950s light aircraft
- FMA IA 36 Cóndor, a 1950s projected Argentine jet airliner
- Schleicher Condor, a German glider
- Seahawk Condor, an American ultralight aircraft
- Southern Condor, an American powered parachute
- Teichfuss Condor II, a 1924 Italian racing glider
- TL Ultralight Condor, a Czech ultralight aircraft
- Wills Wing Condor, an American hang glider
- Rolls-Royce Condor, an aircraft piston engine
- El Condor Airport, a former airstrip near El Condor, Tarija, Bolivia

=== Land ===
- Condor (train), between London and Glasgow 1959–1965
- Cóndor station, in Bolivia
- Dennis Dragon or Condor, a double-decker bus 1982–1999
- UD Condor, a line of commercial vehicles introduced in 1975
- Toyota Kijang, pickup trucks and minivans sold as the Toyota Condor in South Africa

=== Sea ===
- Condor (yacht), 1981
- Condor of Bermuda, a yacht, 1977
- MV Empire MacKendrick, renamed Condor in 1949
- Condor Ferries, a Channel Islands shipping company
- SS Condor, the name of several steamships

== Other uses ==
- Comet Nucleus Dust and Organics Return (CONDOR), a space mission concept
- Condor (options), a trading strategy
- Stoeger Condor, a type of shotgun

== See also ==
- Kunturi (disambiguation), or Condori
- Condor League, an American secondary school athletic conference
- Black Condor, a character in DC Comics
- Black Condor, a character in Chōjin Sentai Jetman
- Silver Condor, a series of awards by the Argentine Film Critics Association
- Steel Condor, a character in the film Up, Up and Away
