= 6P/d'Arrest =

Periodic comet

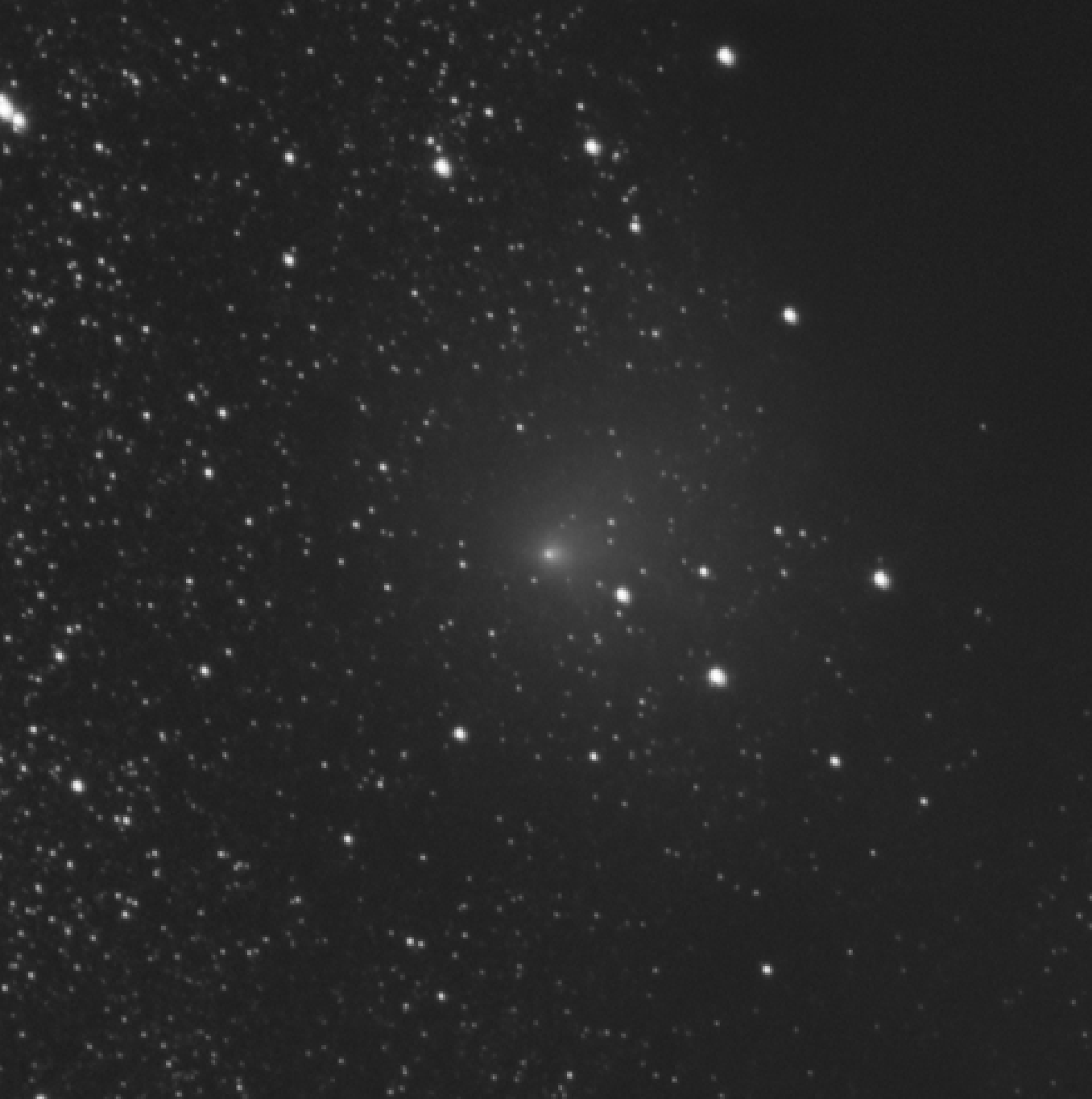
- Comet d'Arrest photographed by the Zwicky Transient Facility on 21 September 2021

Discovery
- Discovered by: Heinrich Louis d'Arrest
- Discovery site: Leipzig, Germany
- Discovery date: June 28, 1851

Designations
- MPC designation: C/1678 R1, P/1851 M1; P/1857 X1
- Alternative designations: 1910c, 1923b, 1950a; 1963f, 1970d, 1976e; 1982e, 1987k

Orbital characteristics
- Epoch: 25 February 2023 (JD 2460000.5)
- Observation arc: 343.47 years (Note: Observation arc from the Minor Planet Center database only covered dates from 21 September 1870 until 1 March 2022 (151.44 years). This figure includes its entire arc up to 11 September 1678.)
- Earliest precovery date: September 11, 1678
- Number of observations: 3,732
- Aphelion: 5.639 AU
- Perihelion: 1.353 AU
- Semi-major axis: 3.497 AU
- Eccentricity: 0.61247
- Orbital period: 6.539 years
- Inclination: 19.511°
- Longitude of ascending node: 138.94°
- Argument of periapsis: 178.09°
- Mean anomaly: 79.175°
- Last perihelion: September 17, 2021
- Next perihelion: March 31, 2028
- T_{Jupiter}: 2.709
- Earth MOID: 0.343 AU
- Jupiter MOID: 0.208 AU

Physical characteristics
- Mean diameter: 3.2 km (2.0 mi)
- Mean density: 570±80 kg/m^{3}
- Synodic rotation period: 6.67±0.03 hours
- Comet total magnitude (M1): 15.9

6P/d'Arrest (also known as d'Arrest's Comet or Comet d'Arrest) is a periodic comet orbiting between Mars and Jupiter once every 6.54 years. It is the second of three comets discovered by German astronomer, Heinrich Ludwig d'Arrest. (Note: In addition to 6P, Heinrich d'Arrest also discovered the comets C/1844 Y2 and C/1857 D1) It next comes to perihelion 1.35 AU from the Sun on March 31, 2028, when it is expected to brighten to around apparent magnitude 11.

== Observational history ==
It was first observed by Heinrich Ludwig d'Arrest, in Leipzig, Germany, between June 28–30, 1851. In 1991, a study conducted by Andrea Carusi and Giovanni B. Valsecchi (Istituto Astrofisica Spaziale, Rome), alongside Ľubor Kresák and Margita Kresáková (Slovak Astronomical Institute, Bratislava) independently suggested that this comet is the same as the comet previously observed by Philippe de La Hire in 1678.

The comet passed within 0.151 AU (22.6 million km; 14.0 million mi) from Earth on August 12, 1976. Its apparition in 2015 was unfavorable as it had a solar elongation of less than 30 degrees from October 2014 until May 2015. The most recent perihelion passage took place on September 17, 2021, when the comet had a solar elongation of 95 degrees at approximately apparent magnitude of 10.

== Physical characteristics ==
During its 2008 apparition, infrared spectroscopy conducted at the Keck Observatory has detected emissions of H_{2}O, CH_{3}OH, C_{2}H_{6}, H_{2}CO and NH_{3} from its coma, where the latter three gases were found to be relatively depleted compared to other comets.

The comet nucleus is estimated at 3.2 km (2.0 mi) in diameter. Photometric measurements in 1976 revealed a rotation period of around 5.17±0.01 hours, however this was revised after a periodogram analysis of its lightcurve in 2003 suggests that the comet has a longer rotation period, around 6.67±0.03 hours.

== Exploration ==
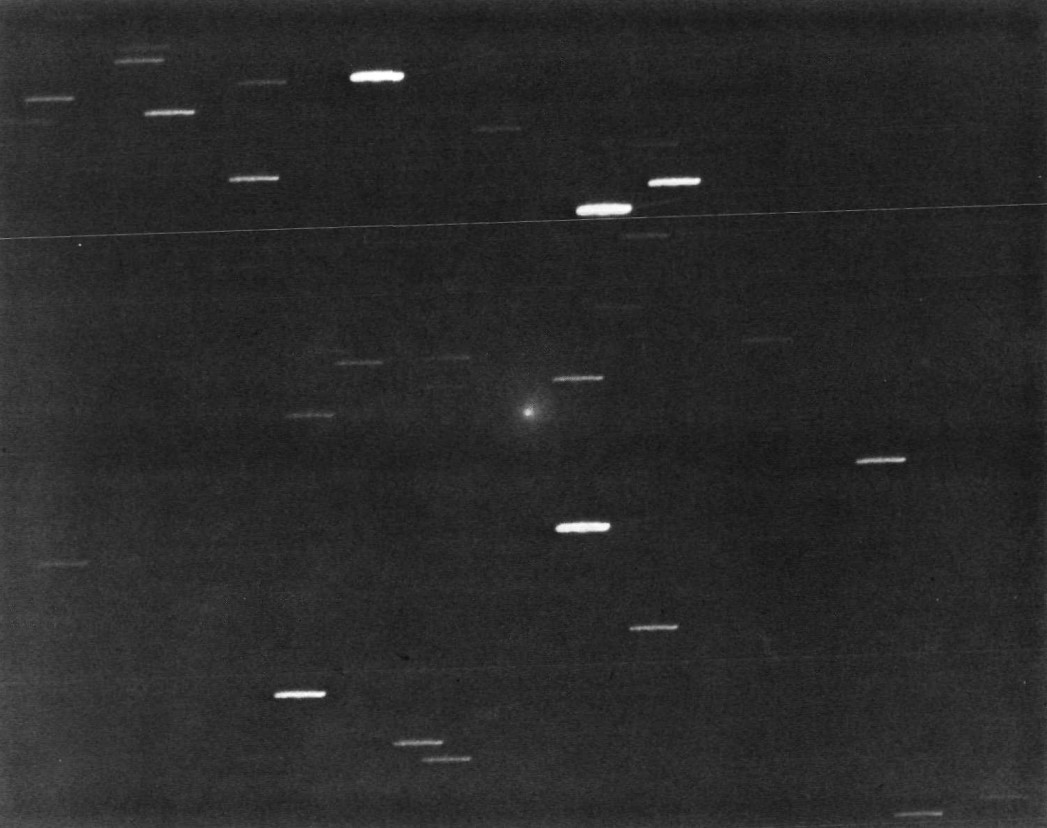
Long-exposure image of Comet d'Arrest taken by Elizabeth Roemer on 7 May 1970

A study in 1966 proposed a Mariner-type mission to 6P/d'Arrest planned to be launched from an Atlas-Centaur by April 1976, arriving at the comet at a distance of 100,000 km (62,000 mi) about 115–145 days after launch, however this did not come to fruition.

6P/d'Arrest was one of a trio of comets alongside 2P/Encke and 73P/Schwassmann–Wachmann targeted by the ill-fated CONTOUR mission, which was launched but lost contact soon after reaching orbit in 2002. Had it been functional, the planned date for CONTOUR's flyby of d'Arrest would have been 2008, after visiting two other comets.

Around 2007, 6P/d'Arrest was one of nine comets examined for a preliminary comet sample return mission study. By the 2010s, three comet surface sample return missions (CONDOR, CORSAIR, and CAESAR) were selected as finalists for the New Frontiers Program, but the recently studied 67P/Churyumov–Gerasimenko and 88P/Howell were chosen as the selected targets. These proposals were ultimately not selected in favor of the Dragonfly mission to Titan.

== See also ==
- List of missions to comets

== Notes ==
Numbered comets
Previous; 5D/Brorsen	6P/d'Arrest	Next; 7P/Pons–Winnecke
