= C34 =

C34 or C-34 may refer to:

== Vehicles ==
Aircraft

- Castel C.34 Condor, a French sailplane
- Cessna C-34, an American civil utility aircraft
- Douglas C-34, an American military transport aircraft

Automobiles

- Nissan Laurel C34, a Japanese sedan
- Sauber C34, a Swiss Formula One car

Locomotives

- New South Wales C34 class locomotive, an Australian steam locomotive

Ships

- HMS C34, a C-class submarine of the Royal Navy
- HMS Lion (C34), a Tiger-class light cruiser of the Royal Navy

== Other uses ==
- C-34 Mosquito Impoundment Project, a pest-control project in Florida
- C34 road (Namibia)
- Caldwell 34, a supernova remnant in the constellation Cygnus
- King's Knight's Gambit, a chess opening
- Lung cancer
- Special Committee on Peacekeeping Operations of the United Nations
