= O&W =

O&W may refer to:

- New York, Ontario and Western Railway, a U.S. railroad from 1880 to 1957
- Oneida and Western Railroad, a U.S. railroad from 1913 to 1954, and later the namesake for a unit train operated by the Shamrock Coal Company in the 1980s
- Ollech & Wajs, a Swiss watchmaker
