= CONTOUR =

Failed NASA cometary flyby mission (2002)

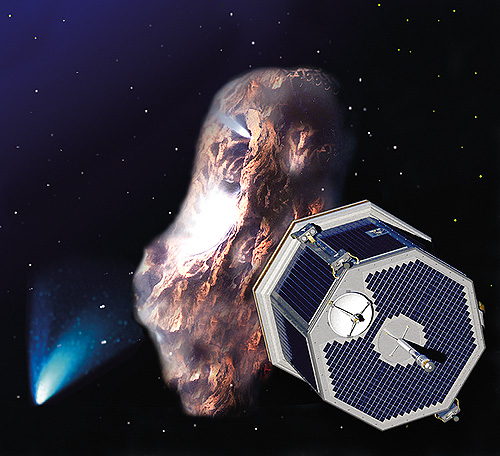
- Artist impression of CONTOUR approaching a comet.
- Names: Comet Nucleus Tour
- Mission type: Cometary flyby
- Operator: NASA / APL
- COSPAR ID: 2002-034A
- SATCAT no.: 27457
- Website: science.nasa.gov
- Mission duration: 1 month, 12 days

Spacecraft properties
- Manufacturer: Applied Physics Laboratory
- Launch mass: 398 kg (877 lb)
- Dimensions: 2.1 × 1.8 × 1.8 m (6.9 × 5.9 × 5.9 ft)
- Power: 670 watts

Start of mission
- Launch date: 3 July 2002, 06:47:41 UTC
- Rocket: Delta II 7425–9.5; D-292
- Launch site: Cape Canaveral SLC-17
- Contractor: Boeing

End of mission
- Disposal: Destroyed
- Last contact: 15 August 2002
Instruments
- CIDA: Comet Impact Dust Analyzer
- CRISP: CONTOUR Remote Imager/Spectrograph
- CAI: CONTOUR Aft Imager
- NGIMS: Neutral Gas Ion Mass Spectrometer

The Comet Nucleus Tour (CONTOUR) was a NASA Discovery-class space probe that failed shortly after its July 2002 launch. It was the only Discovery mission to fail.

The two comets scheduled to be visited were Encke and Schwassmann-Wachmann-3, and the third target was d'Arrest. It was hoped that a new comet would have been discovered in the inner Solar System between 2006 and 2008, in which case the spacecraft trajectory would have been changed if possible to rendezvous with the new comet. Scientific objectives included imaging the nuclei at resolutions of up to 4 meters (13 ft), performing spectral mapping of the nuclei at resolutions of up to 100 meters (330 ft), and obtaining detailed compositional data on gas and dust in the near-nucleus environment, with the goal of improving knowledge of the characteristics of comet nuclei.

After the solid rocket motor intended to inject the spacecraft into solar orbit was ignited on August 15, 2002, contact with the probe could not be re-established. Ground-based telescopes later found three objects along the course of the satellite, leading to the speculation that it had disintegrated. Attempts to contact the probe were ended on December 20, 2002. The probe thus accomplished none of its primary scientific objectives, but did prove some spaceflight technologies, such as the APL-developed non-coherent Doppler tracking spacecraft navigation technique, which was later used on the New Horizons spacecraft.

== Spacecraft ==
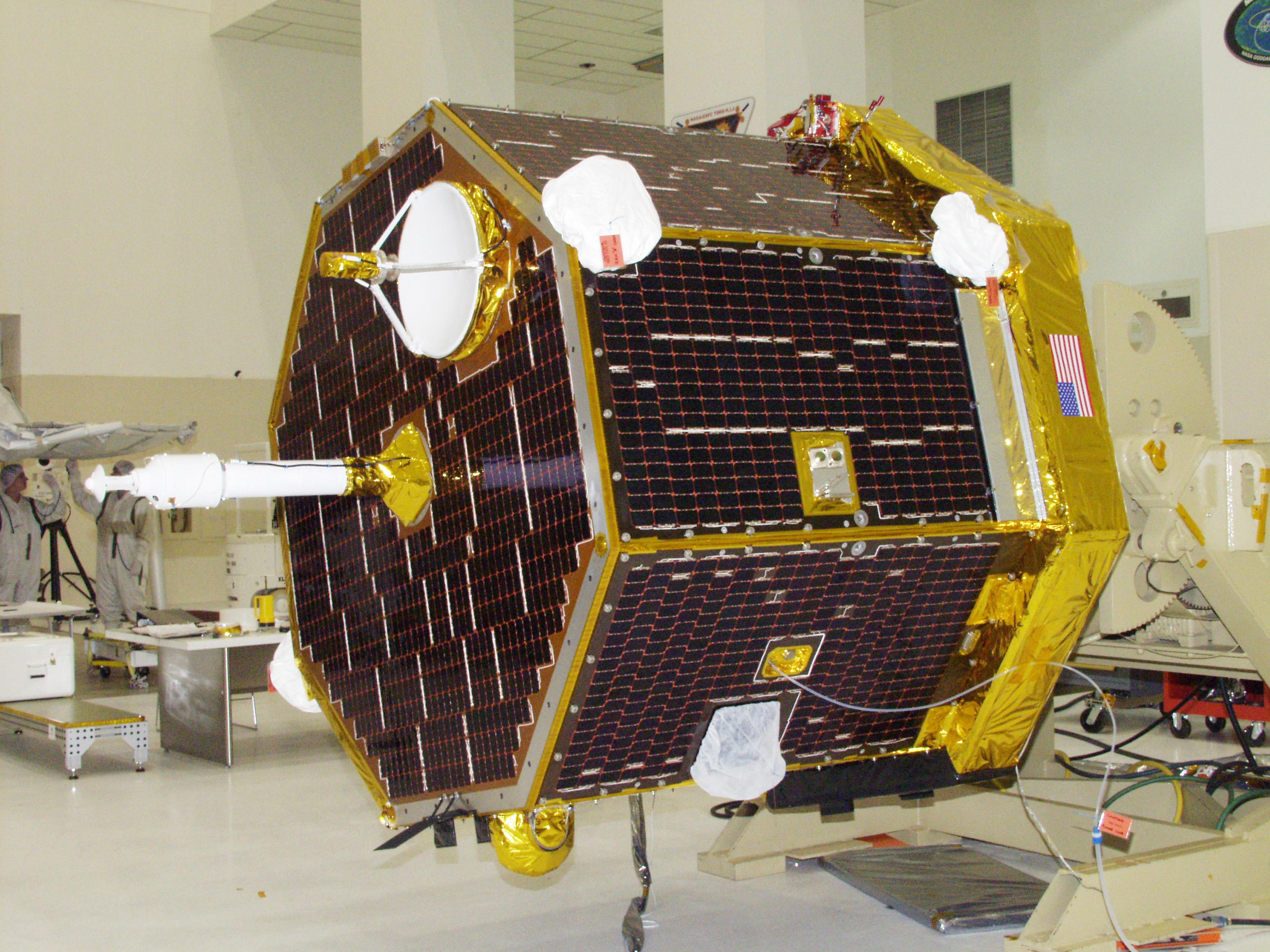
The CONTOUR spacecraft at the Kennedy Space Center in May 2002, being prepared for launch.

=== Design and construction ===
The CONTOUR spacecraft was constructed in-house at the Johns Hopkins University Applied Physics Laboratory. CONTOUR was shaped as an octagonal prism, measuring at 2.1 metres (6.9 ft) tall and 1.8 metres (5.9 ft) long, had a total fueled mass of 398 kg (877 lb) at launch, not including the 377 kg (831 lb) mass of the Star 30 booster it was attached to, during the launch phase of the mission. The spacecraft was fitted with a 25 cm (9.8 in) whipple shield, similar to the one used on Stardust, on its leading face, designed with four layers of nextel fabric and seven layers of kevlar. The shield was built to allow the spacecraft to withstand the respective 28.2 and 14 kilometres per second (17.5 and 8.7 mi/s) velocity flybys of comets Encke and Schwassmann-Wachmann-3, where the spacecraft would be subjected to numerous particles ejecting from the nuclei of the comets. Although mission scientists predicted that the spacecraft would take no significant damage during the Encke and Schwassmann-Wachmann-3 encounters, the shield and its prototypes were tested vigorously during the construction of the spacecraft, including one where a shield prototype was shot at with surrogate nylon particles from a two stage light-gas gun. The results of the earlier tests allowed mission planners to determine a safe distance from which the CONTOUR would pass by comets targeted on the mission. Three of the four scientific instruments aboard the spacecraft were embedded within this shield.

=== Spacecraft subsystems ===
==== Power ====
Power for CONTOUR derives from solar cells, which are mounted onto the spacecraft, decorating the sides and rear and generating up to 670 watts of power. A nickel–cadmium battery designed to last up to nine ampere hours was also installed aboard the spacecraft in the event that the solar cell system fails, or does not provide enough power for the spacecraft or its instruments to function.

==== Propulsion and guidance ====
Unlike many interplanetary missions, CONTOUR was not designed to be propelled beyond Earth orbit by the rocket that launched it, instead it exited Earth orbit using a STAR-30 solid rocket booster built into the spacecraft. This STAR-30 engine provided 1,922 metres per second (6,310 ft/s) of delta-v. The firing of this engine is the reason the CONTOUR spacecraft was destroyed. In addition, there were 16 hydrazine thrusters for normal propulsion and course corrections. These thrusters were divided into four clusters of four.

=== Scientific payload ===
- CIDA

The Comet Impact Dust Analyzer (CIDA)

- CRISP

The CONTOUR Remote Imager/Spectrograph (CRISP)

- CAI

The CONTOUR Aft Imager (CAI), also known as the CONTOUR Forward Imager (CFI)

- NGIMS

Neutral Gas Ion Mass Spectrometer (NGIMS)

== Mission ==
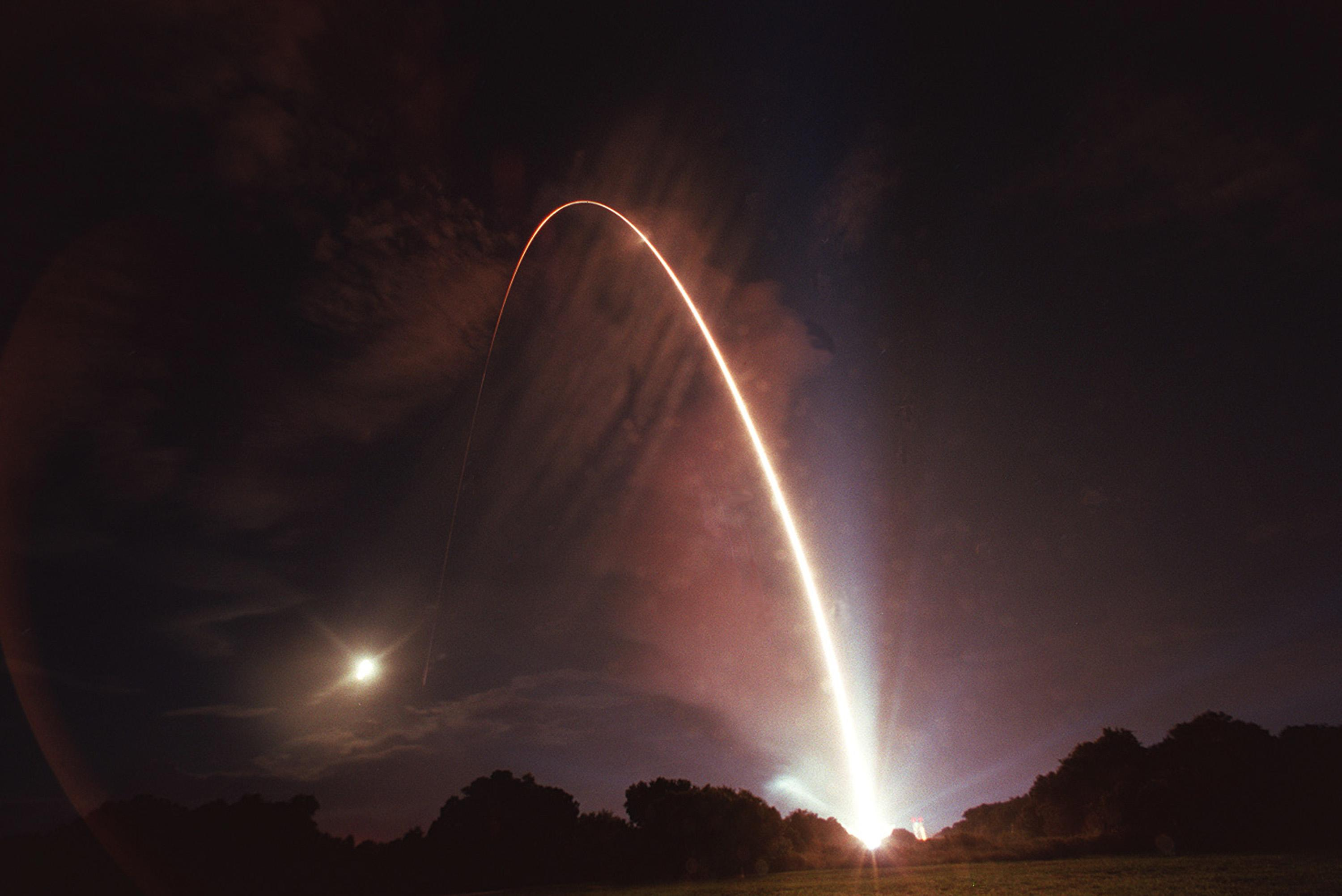
Long-exposure photograph of the launch of CONTOUR from Cape Canaveral on July 3, 2002.

CONTOUR launched on a Delta 7425 (a Delta II Lite launch vehicle with four strap-on solid-rocket boosters and a Star 27 third stage) on July 3, 2002, at 6:47:41 UT (2:47:41 a.m. EDT) from Cape Canaveral Air Force Station. It was launched into a high-apogee Earth orbit with a period of 5.5 days. Following a series of phasing orbits, the Star 30 solid rocket motor was used to perform an injection maneuver on August 15, 2002, to put CONTOUR in the proper trajectory for an Earth flyby on August 15, 2003, followed by an encounter with comet Encke on November 12, 2003, at a distance of 100 to 160 kilometres (62 to 99 mi) and a flyby speed of 28.2 kilometres per second (17.5 mi/s), 1.07 AU from the Sun and 0.27 AU from Earth. During the August 2002 injection maneuver, the probe was lost.

Three more Earth flybys would have followed, on August 14, 2004, February 10, 2005, and February 10, 2006. On June 18, 2006, CONTOUR would have encountered comet Schwassmann-Wachmann-3 at 14 kilometres per second (8.7 mi/s), 0.95 AU from the Sun and 0.33 AU from Earth. Two more Earth flybys were scheduled in February 2007 and 2008, and a flyby of comet d'Arrest might have occurred on 16 August 2008 at a relative velocity of 11.8 kilometres per second (7.3 mi/s), 1.35 AU from the Sun and 0.36 AU from Earth. All flybys would have had a closest encounter distance of about 100 kilometres (62 mi) and would have occurred near the period of maximum activity for each comet. After the comet Encke encounter, CONTOUR might have been retargeted towards a new comet if one was discovered with the desired characteristics (e.g. active, brighter than absolute magnitude 10, perihelion within 1.5 AU).

== Investigation into failure ==
According to NASA: "An investigation board concluded that the most likely cause of the mishap was structural failure of the spacecraft due to plume heating during the solid-rocket motor burn. Alternate possible but less likely causes determined were catastrophic failure of the solid rocket motor, collision with space debris, and loss of dynamic control of the spacecraft."

== Proposed reflight ==
After the loss of CONTOUR, a replacement spacecraft – CONTOUR 2 – was proposed, scheduled for launch in 2006. However, the replacement did not ultimately materialize.

== See also ==
- List of missions to comets
