= 87P/Bus =

Periodic comet

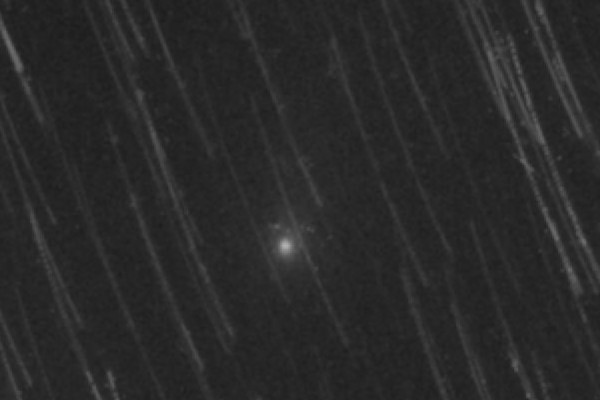
- Comet 87P/Bus photographed by the Hubble Space Telescope on 7 June 2001

Discovery
- Discovered by: Schelte J. Bus
- Discovery site: Siding Spring Observatory (UK Schmidt Telescope)
- Discovery date: 2 March 1981

Designations
- MPC designation: P/1981 E1, P/1987 B4
- Alternative designations: 1981 XI, 1987 XXXIV; 1994 XVI; 1981b, 1987f, 1993b

Orbital characteristics
- Epoch: 31 May 2025 (JD 2459000.5)
- Observation arc: 39.57 years
- Earliest precovery date: 9 February 1981
- Number of observations: 801
- Aphelion: 4.776 AU
- Perihelion: 2.099 AU
- Semi-major axis: 3.438 AU
- Eccentricity: 0.38918
- Orbital period: 6.374 years
- Inclination: 2.603°
- Longitude of ascending node: 181.87°
- Argument of periapsis: 24.932°
- Mean anomaly: 3.356°
- Last perihelion: 9 May 2020
- Next perihelion: 7 June 2029
- T_{Jupiter}: 3.009
- Earth MOID: 1.098 AU
- Jupiter MOID: 0.181 AU

Physical characteristics
- Mean radius: 0.27±0.01 km
- Synodic rotation period: 32.0±9.0 hours
- Spectral type: (V–R) = 0.545±0.02
- Comet total magnitude (M1): 12.7
- Comet nuclear magnitude (M2): 16.1

87P/Bus is an Encke-type comet with a current orbital period of 6.37 years around the Sun. It is the only comet discovered by American astronomer, Schelte J. Bus.

== Observational history ==
It was discovered by Schelte J. Bus on the night of 2 March 1981 from a photographic plate taken with the 1.2m UK Schmidt telescope at the Siding Spring Observatory. Additional observations by Kenneth S. Russell noticed a faint tail about 20 arcseconds in length to the northwest, estimated to be 17.5 in apparent magnitude. Preliminary orbital calculations in 9 March 1981 had Brian G. Marsden to conclude that the comet may be a short-periodic one, which was later confirmed after Bus was able to find precovery images as early as 9–13 February 1981.

It has been observed on each of its subsequent apparitions, most recently in 2020.

== Physical characteristics ==
Preliminary CCD photometry from the La Palma Observatory in December 1998 obtained an upper limit value of around 0.6–0.8 km (0.37–0.50 mi) for the comet's nuclear radius. Later observations from the Hubble Space Telescope in 2009 revised the size of its nucleus, which is now estimated to be 0.27±0.01 km in radius. Hubble data also showed the comet to be elongated in shape, with an a/b ratio greater than 2.2. Its rotational period is estimated to be around 32.0±9.0 hours in length.

== Orbit ==
Perihelion distance at different epochs
| Epoch | Perihelion (AU) |
| 1942 | 4.43 |
| 1955 | 2.13 |
| 2029 | 3.69 |

A close approach to Jupiter on 13 May 1952, at a distance of 0.0668 AU (9.99 million km), lowered the orbital period from 12.46 years and the perihelion distance from 4.43 AU to 6.43 years and 2.13 AU respectively. Another close approach to Jupiter on 24 February 2023, at a distance of 0.182 AU (27.2 million km), raised the perihelion to 3.62 AU and the orbital period to 9.58 years.

== Bibliography ==
- Kronk, Gary W.; Meyer, Maik; Seargent, David A. J. (2010). Cometography: A Catalog of Comets. Vol. 5: 1960–1982. Cambridge University Press. ISBN 978-0-521-87226-3.
- Kronk, Gary W.; Meyer, Maik; Seargent, David A. J. (2017). Cometography: A Catalog of Comets. Vol. 6: 1983–1993. Cambridge University Press. ISBN 978-0-521-87216-4.

Numbered comets
| Previous; 86P/Wild | 87P/Bus | Next; 88P/Howell |
