= Ellen Howell =

American astronomer and planetary scientist

Ellen Susanna Howell (born 1961; also published as Ellen S. Bus) is an American astronomer and planetary scientist who studies the composition and structure of asteroids and comets within the Solar System. She is a research professor at the Lunar and Planetary Laboratory of the University of Arizona, and a team member for the OSIRIS-REx sample-and-return space mission.

== Education and career ==
Howell majored in geophysics at the California Institute of Technology, graduating in 1981. Returning to graduate study, she completed a Ph.D. in planetary sciences at the University of Arizona in 1995.

After postdoctoral research at the Arecibo Observatory from 1995 to 1999, and continuing as a research associate at Arecibo until 2015, she returned to the University of Arizona in 2015 as a senior research scientist.

== Research ==
In 1977, Howell discovered asteroid 3598 Saucier using the Palomar Observatory. She named it after her grandmother, Agnes Elizabeth Saucier. In the same year, Schelte J. Bus, whom she later married, discovered asteroid 2735 Ellen; he named it after her. Howell discovered comet 88P/Howell at Palomar in 1981.

At Arecibo, Howell's research included radar observations of asteroids including triple asteroid (136617) 1994 CC and near-Earth asteroid 2014 HQ124. After her undergraduate discovery of comet 88P/Howell, Howell has also maintained her interests in the observation of comets, including making radar observations of comet 46P/Wirtanen in 2018 using the Arecibo Observatory, one of the last observations from Arecibo before its 2020 collapse.

Her work with OSIRIS-REx has included the discovery of water-related chemical compounds on asteroid 101955 Bennu, the target of the OSIRIS-REx mission. Howell also contributed to radar observations of the asteroid Bennu helping to determine different aspects of the asteroid such as shape and size.

Howell's current research is funded by the following grants: Combining thermal and radar observations of near-Earth asteroids, Water and OH on Primitive Bodies: Expanding the Frontier, Volatiles, Regolith and Thermal Investigations Consortium for Exploration and Science (VORTICES), and In the Eye of the Storm: Inner coma remote sensing of three Jupiter Family Comets.
