= Comet Rendezvous, Sample Acquisition, Investigation, and Return =

NASA concept mission

COmet Rendezvous, Sample Acquisition, Investigation, and Return (CORSAIR) is a concept mission to return comet nucleus samples to Earth for detailed analysis. The mission concept was submitted in May 2017 by a team from NASA's Goddard Space Flight Center in response to the New Frontiers program call for mission 4, but did not pass the initial down selection. As a comet sample return mission was not ultimately selected for mission 4 (Dragonfly, a Titan probe was selected), the CORSAIR team may re-submit the concept to a future New Frontiers program call.

== Objectives ==
The CORSAIR goal is understanding the role of comets as ingredients for planets and life. If selected for development, CORSAIR would rendezvous with comet 88P/Howell for approximately 140 days to perform detailed physical and chemical characterization and return to Earth with comet samples of the nucleus and its coma.

If selected for development, the mission would have launched in 2024, cruise to the comet would take 7 years, including two Earth gravity assists. Rendezvous with the 88P/Howell would happen in May 2031 and the interactions would last up to 294 days. The return trip to Earth would take about 4.3 years.

== Scientific payload ==
CORSAIR's conceptual scientific payload include:

- CORSAIR Dual Imaging System (CorDIS), for near and wide angle imaging of the nucleus surface
- Coma Dust Sampler (CDS) a Japanese-contributed coma dust flux monitoring and coma dust sampling system
- CORSAIR Altimetric Laser (CorAL), a copy of the OSIRIS-REx/OLA instrument for sample site topography and near-comet navigation
- CORSAIR THermal EMission Imaging System (C-THEMIS): a Mars Odyssey-heritage instrument for characterization of thermal inertia and mineralogical variability on the nucleus surface
- CORSAIR Mass Spectrometer (C-MaSt), a Swiss contribution from Rosetta/ROSINA heritage for coma and volatile measurements
- Proximity Cameras (ProxCams), are replicas of the OSIRIS-REx TagCams for near comet navigation and imaging of the sampling events
- Radio Science (RS), and onboard communications system to determine comet nucleus mass

Surface samples would be obtained with the use of a harpoon-like penetrator.

== See also ==
- Abiogenesis
- Comet Nucleus Dust and Organics Return (CONDOR), a competing concept for mission #4
- List of missions to comets
- List of interstellar and circumstellar molecules
