= SS Condor =

A number of steamships have been named Condor, including two Grace Line ships

- SS Condor (1893), captured and sunk by Germany in 1914
- SS Condor (1920), in service 1927–1940

== See also ==
- SS Empire Condor
- MV Condor
