= Thousand Islands (Cocoa Beach) =

Islands in Florida, United States

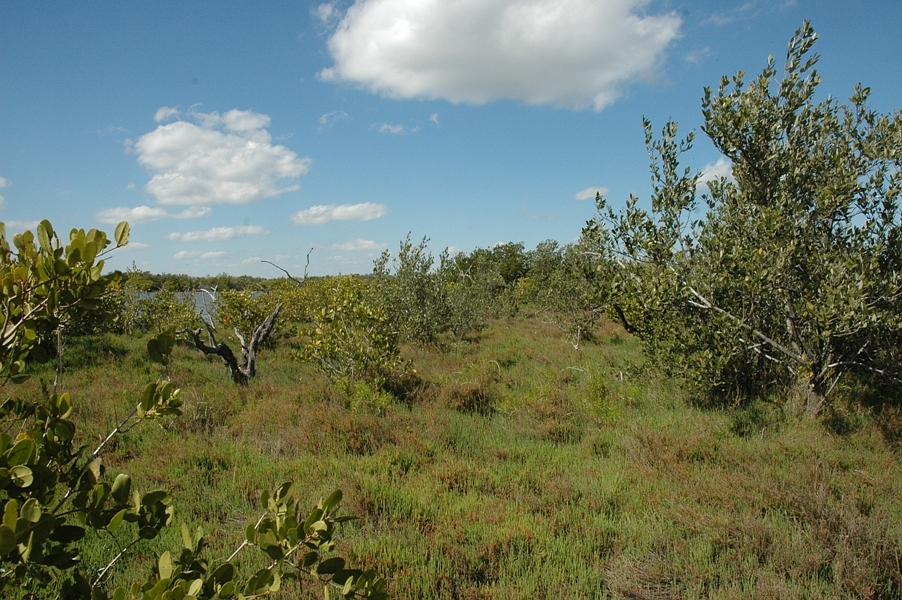
- Native salt marsh mangrove plant growth.

- Thousand Islands Thousand Islands (Cocoa Beach) (North Atlantic)

Geography
- Location: North Atlantic
- Coordinates: 28.3227845°N 80.6281073°W
- Total islands: ~100

Administration
- United States
- County: Brevard County

The Thousand Islands are a group of natural, modified, and spoil islands in the Banana River Lagoon, Cocoa Beach, in Brevard County, Florida. From the late 1950s to the early 1970s the islands were reshaped by development and efforts to control mosquitoes as the population of Brevard grew during the initial period of the space program at Cape Canaveral and Kennedy Space Center.

== History ==
The State of Florida bought the Thousand Islands in 1988. It leased them back to the City of Cocoa Beach in 1991, providing that the islands be used for recreation and conservational efforts. The total price was $3,230,950. The city contributed $1,615,475, Brevard County contributed $700,000, and the State of Florida contributed $915,475.

== Geomorphology ==
Sediment cores reveal that the Thousand Islands were formed when a storm-driven sea broke through the barrier island, leaving behind an approximately 900-acre (360 ha) flood tide delta deposit. The date of this event is unknown. Charts from the mid 19th century and older do not depict the Thousand Islands. However, this might be due to lack of detail. The Cocoa Beach area was surveyed in 1876-1877 and appears identical to the 1951 aerial photographs.

The stratigraphic characteristics of a flood tide delta deposit include the existence of a layer of plain sand (often containing terrestrial vegetation debris) sandwiched between sediments containing numerous small bivalve mollusc shells that are indicative of deposition in a normal lagoon environment. This uneven sand layer lacking shells suggests an interruption in the normal accretion of benthic sediments by a rapid deposition of dune material being washed in by severe wave action.

There are about 100 islands in the Thousand Islands, The actual number of islands is meaningless due to the inundation of many areas during seasonal high water during summer. The relatively low topography and rising water levels can turn one island into many as rains begin.

The Thousand Islands are divided roughly in half by the Minutemen Causeway. The formation comprises approximately 900 acres (360 ha) of salt marsh, mangroves, spoil sites containing upland vegetation, and maritime hammocks on shell middens. Beginning in the late 1950s, small ditches were dug through the islands to allow water movement and fish access to inner areas of the succulent marsh for mosquito control.

At approximately the same time, dredge and fill activities were begun in Cocoa Beach for housing development. Developers dredged canals and used the spoil to provide fill material for houses. Several areas of the Thousand Islands were filled but not fully developed, leaving large areas of uplands. During the late 1960s Brevard County Mosquito Control began dredging the Thousand Islands south of Minutemen Causeway, resulting in conversion of salt marsh to upland dredge spoil with the state-owned C-34 impoundment.

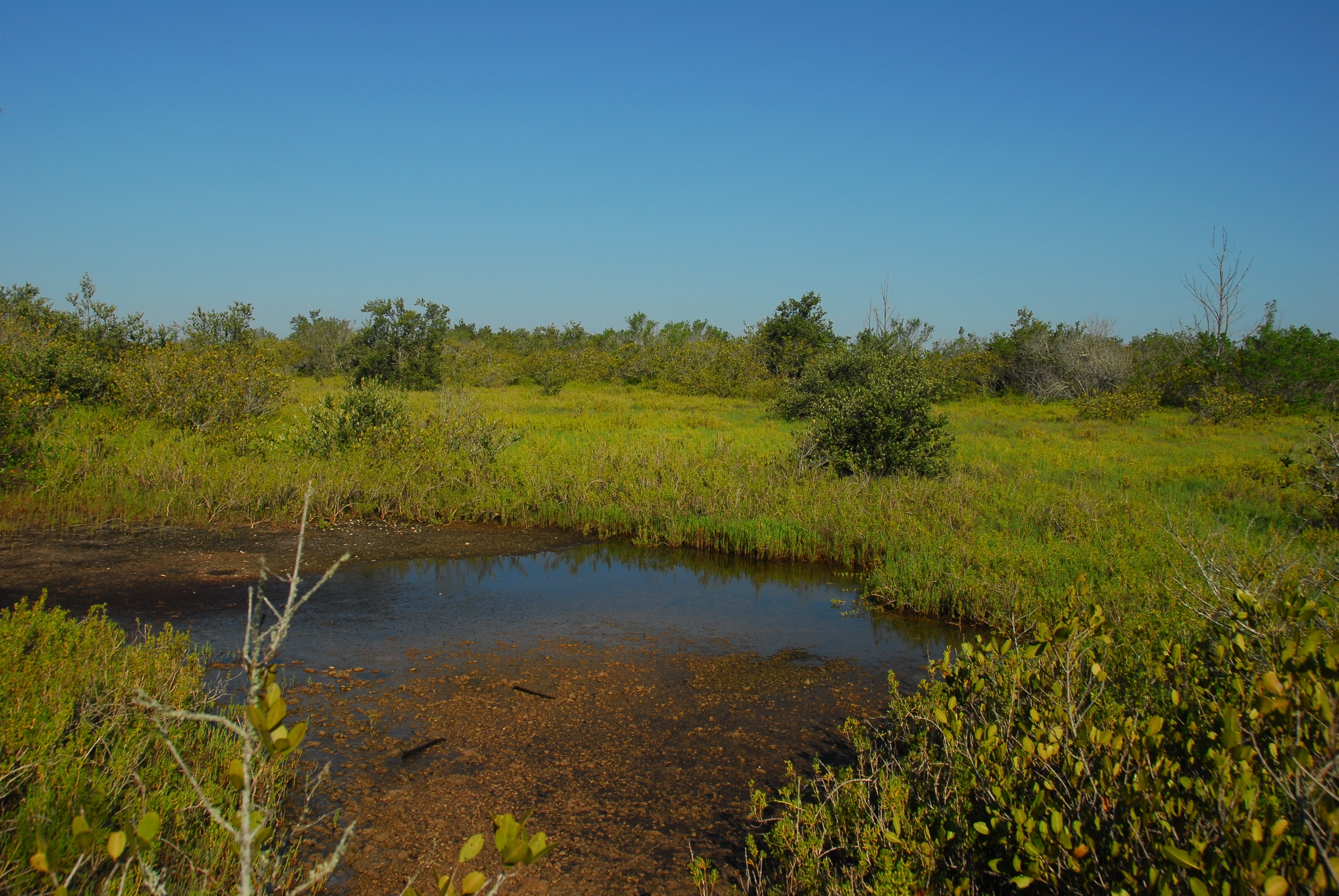
Photograph of flooded ephemeral pond, prime breeding habitat for saltmarsh mosquitoes.

Mosquito ditches. Effects on vegetation are minimal, simply allowing mangroves to colonize the ditch edges due to increased propagule dispersal.

Mosquito canals and dikes. Wetland vegetation is nearly eliminated, reduced to a fringe of mangroves along island edges.

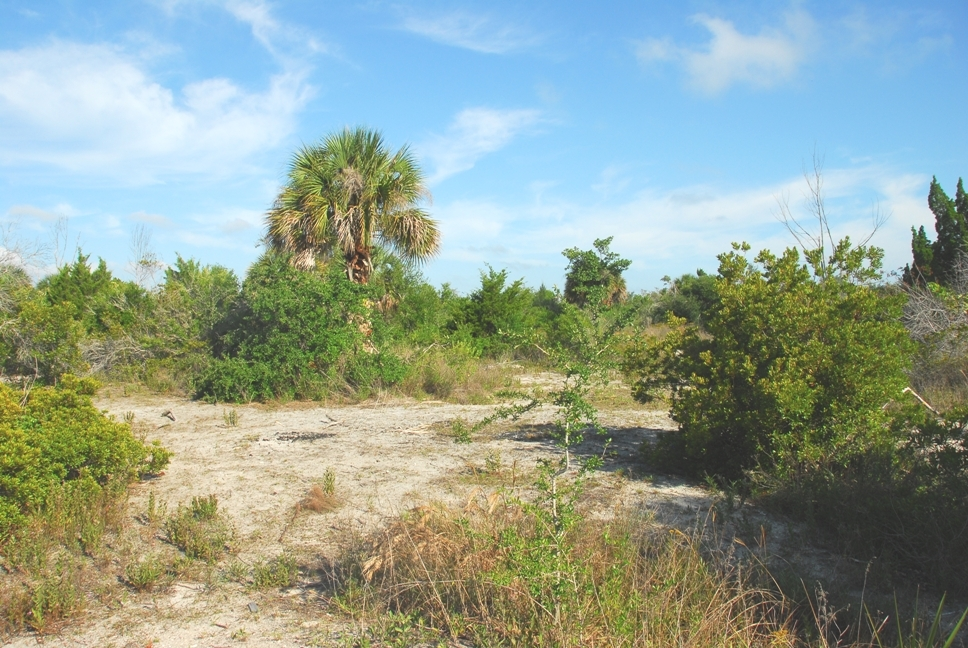
Dredge spoil plant community.

== Flora ==
Native wetlands are dominated by red, black, and white mangroves. Succulent marsh contains saltwort, annual glasswort, perennial glasswort, sea blight, and shoreline seapurslane.

The transition zone between salt marsh and upland is dominated by bushy seaside oxeye (Borrichia frutescens (L.) DC.) and buttonwood (Conocarpus erectus L.). Transition areas dominated by graminoid vegetation contain saltgrass (Distichlis spicata (L.) Greene) and seashore paspalum (Paspalum vaginatum Sw.).

Uplands have been colonized by several native plant species, including Florida swamp privet (Forestiera segregata (Jacq.) Krug & Urb.), salt bush (Baccharis halimifolia L.), cabbage palm (Sabal palmetto (Walter) Lodd. ex Shult. & Schult. f.), wax myrtle (Myrica cerifera L.), and strangler fig (Ficus aurea Nutt.).

Principal invasive non-native plants include Brazilian pepper (Schinus terebinthifolius Raddi), Australian pines (Casuarina equisetifolia L., Casuarina glauca Sieber ex Spreng.), and carrotwood (Cupaniopsis anacardioides (A. Rich.) Radlk.). All are Category I invasives, "...altering native plant communities by displacing native species, changing community structures or ecological functions..."

Pre-Columbian shell middens are present in four main areas of the Thousand Islands.

== Acquisition, Restoration ==
The state of Florida and Cocoa Beach purchased the islands north of Minutemen Causeway in 1988. Acquisition of the remaining south islands was completed by 2007. These islands are managed as the Thousand Islands Conservation Area by Brevard County Environmentally Endangered Lands Program. Efforts to acquire the remaining privately held islands began in 2006 with acquisition of the Reynolds tract, and were completed in 2007 with acquisition of the Crawford Homes tract by the Brevard County Environmentally Endangered Lands Program (EEL).

Restoration efforts involve removal of Brazilian pepper and Australian pine. Despite the Category I status of Australian pine, removal of trees in ecological restoration can be controversial among the lay public. In the EEL-managed Thousand Islands Conservation Area, replanting has been used following removal of Australian pine, but the effects are modest, with native recruitment out-pacing planted species. The management plan for the north Thousand Islands is currently (April 2013) under revision.

== External references ==
Plant nomenclature follows Wunderlin, R. P. & B. F. Hansen. (2011). Guide to the Vascular Plants of Florida, 3rd Edition. University Press of Florida, Gainesville.
