= Operation Condor (disambiguation) =

Operation Condor was a campaign of assassination and intelligence-gathering conducted by several Latin American countries in the mid-1970s.

Operation Condor may also refer to:

== Military operations ==
- Operation Condor (1954), a French intelligence service operation during the Battle of Dien Bien Phu in Vietnam
- Operation Condor (Afghanistan), a 2002 British-led operation in southeastern Afghanistan
- Operation CONDOR, a 1942 military operation also known as Operation Salam
- Operation Condor, a never-mounted World War II mission in 1943, proposed in conjunction with Operation Constellation, among others
- Operativo Cóndor, the 1966 operation name for the hijacking of Aerolíneas Argentinas Flight 648

== Film ==
- Operation Condor (2022 film), a Peruvian political thriller film
- Armour of God II: Operation Condor, a 1991 film starring Jackie Chan, also known as Operation Condor 2

== See also ==
- Condor (disambiguation)
