= 86P/Wild =

Periodic comet with 6 year orbit

Discovery
- Discovered by: Paul Wild at Zimmerwald Observatory, Switzerland
- Discovery date: April 1980

Orbital characteristics
- Epoch: 27 June 2015
- Aphelion: 4.942 AU
- Perihelion: 2.2635 AU
- Semi-major axis: 3.6043 AU
- Eccentricity: 0.3719
- Orbital period: 6.84 yr
- Inclination: 15.47°
- Last perihelion: 7 February 2022; 3 April 2015
- Next perihelion: 2029-Jan-23

Physical characteristics
- Mean density: 490±70 kg/m^{3}

86P/Wild (pronounced 86P/Vilt) is a periodic comet in the Solar System with a current orbital period of 6.84 years. Its nucleus is estimated to have an effective radius of 0.37 ± 0.02 kilometers.

It was discovered on photographic plates exposed on 11/12 April 1980 by Paul Wild of the Astronomical Institute of University of Bern, Switzerland at the nearby Zimmerwald Observatory. He reported the brightness at a magnitude of 15.5 and that the comet was diffuse. He rediscovered it on 7 May 1980 and calculations by Brian G. Marsden estimated that perihelion would take place on 6 October 1980.

Syuichi Nakano calculated the next perihelion would be 31 August 1987 and the comet was duly observed by Tom Gehrels and J. V. Scotti on the Spacewatch telescope at Kitt Peak Observatory, Arizona, USA. Perihelion was 1 September.

The same team re-observed it in 1994 with a faint brightness of magnitude 21. It has since been observed in 2001, 2008 and 2015.

== See also ==
- List of numbered comets

Numbered comets
Previous; 85D/Boethin	86P/Wild	Next; 87P/Bus
