= Ollech & Wajs =

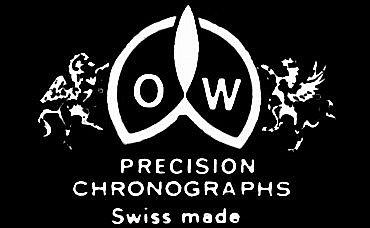

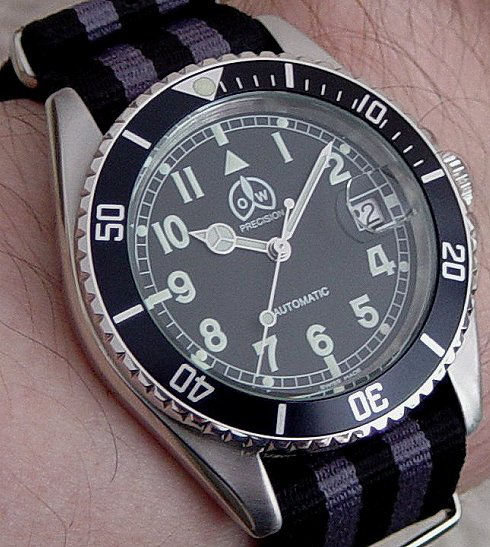
- O&W M1 diver model
- Industry: Watch manufacturing
- Founded: 1956
- Founder: Albert J. Wajs; Joseph Ollech
- Headquarters: Zurich, Switzerland
- Area served: Worldwide
- Website: ow-watch.ch

Ollech & Wajs (O&W) is a watch company based in Zurich, Switzerland.

== History ==
In the 1950s, Albert J. Wajs founded the company as a supplier of stainless steel bracelets. He partnered with Joseph Ollech in 1956 and expanded into the manufacture of wristwatches from retail space in Zurich. Watches were offered by mail order from Switzerland through magazine ads to customers in the United States and UK.

The company specialized in automatic and manual-wind mechanical military and dive watches. They were sold in PX's on US military bases during the 1960s. The company's M 65 military watch was popular with US soldiers. The Vietnam War era marked an all-time high in sales. Breitling Navitimer stock was used to produce Ollech & Wajs chronometer-style watches, called "Aviation". During the first season of the 1970s British television series The Professionals, actors Martin Shaw and Lewis Collins wore what appear to be Ollech & Wajs Caribbean 1000 wristwatches, which is 1,000m water-resistant.

O&W finally ended production of OW models in the early 1980s, although business continued with the Aviation chronographs. In the 1990s, the company resumed under the name A.I. Wajs. and subsequently OW. New models were successfully introduced, such as the M4 diving watch and the Mirage Valjoux 7750 chronograph.

In 2006 a collector of OW became the distributor of the brand for the French market, and in 2017, Albert J. Wajs passed the company over to him.

In 2019, the brand was revived with the launch of the OW P-101 and OW P-104 pilot models. In 2021, the company released the OW 350CI which was created to fit the design of the Condor A350 motorbikes.

== See also ==
- Automatic watch
- Mechanical watch
