= C-34 Mosquito Impoundment Project =

Project in Florida, US

Coordinates: 28.307044°N 80.629813°W

The C-34 Mosquito Impoundment Project was a collaboration in the Thousand Islands during the 1970s between Brevard County Mosquito Control, The Florida Medical Entomological Laboratory, and NASA. This project was conducted to test the ability of remote sensing to detect flooding stress in mangroves during flooding for mosquito control.

Mosquito control in the Cocoa Beach area was initially provided by application of various pesticides, including DDT. Cocoa Beach was the site of initial field tests for DDT, and one of the first locations where resistance was noted. This led to use of source reduction in addition to pesticides.

Source reduction is a mechanical modification of habitat to decrease mosquito production. The saltmarsh mosquito will not lay its eggs in standing water, preferring seasonally-flooded sand or mud instead. The concept behind source reduction is to convert seasonally-flooded marsh to either upland or submerged land.

Source reduction began to be used in the late 1950s in Cocoa Beach. In this beginning phase small ditches were dug through the islands to allow water movement and fish access to inner areas of the succulent marsh. This approach had limited success. During the late 1960s Brevard County Mosquito Control began dredging the Thousand Islands south of Minutemen Causeway to eliminate ephemeral ponds necessary for saltmarsh mosquito breeding. This destruction of wetlands set the stage for an approach that would retain wetlands but still reduce the production of saltmarsh mosquitoes. This approach is known as impoundment, in which an area of salt marsh is surrounded by a dike with a means to flood and empty the marsh, generally by pump.

== Construction ==
Construction plan for C-34 Impoundment.

Construction plans called for completion of a perimeter dike around the subject section of islands, with the dike carried inside of a shell midden to avoid flooding tropical vegetation found there. A pump house allowed flooding of the impoundment during the summer rainy season when mosquito breeding is most intense. Flapper valve gates at the north and south ends of the impoundment were installed to allow closure during flooding and opening during the dry season to allow water exchange with the lagoon.

Perimeter dike of C-34 impoundment.

A test cell was constructed so as to be flooded separately from the main impoundment. This area was to be flooded sufficiently to inundate black mangrove (Avicennia germinans) pneumatophores, in hopes that stress could be detected by false infrared aerial photography. Several flights were flown but stress could not be detected by remote sensing before it was evident on the ground. This is thought to have been due to the propensity for black mangroves to drop their leaves all at once rather than slowly enough for color changes to be picked up in the photographs.

Remains of C-34 impoundment pump house.

Active management of the impoundment ended in the early 1980s.

== Notes ==
This area is also known as Gumbo Limbo Island and "The Ring" by locals.
