= 88P/Howell =

Jupiter-family comet

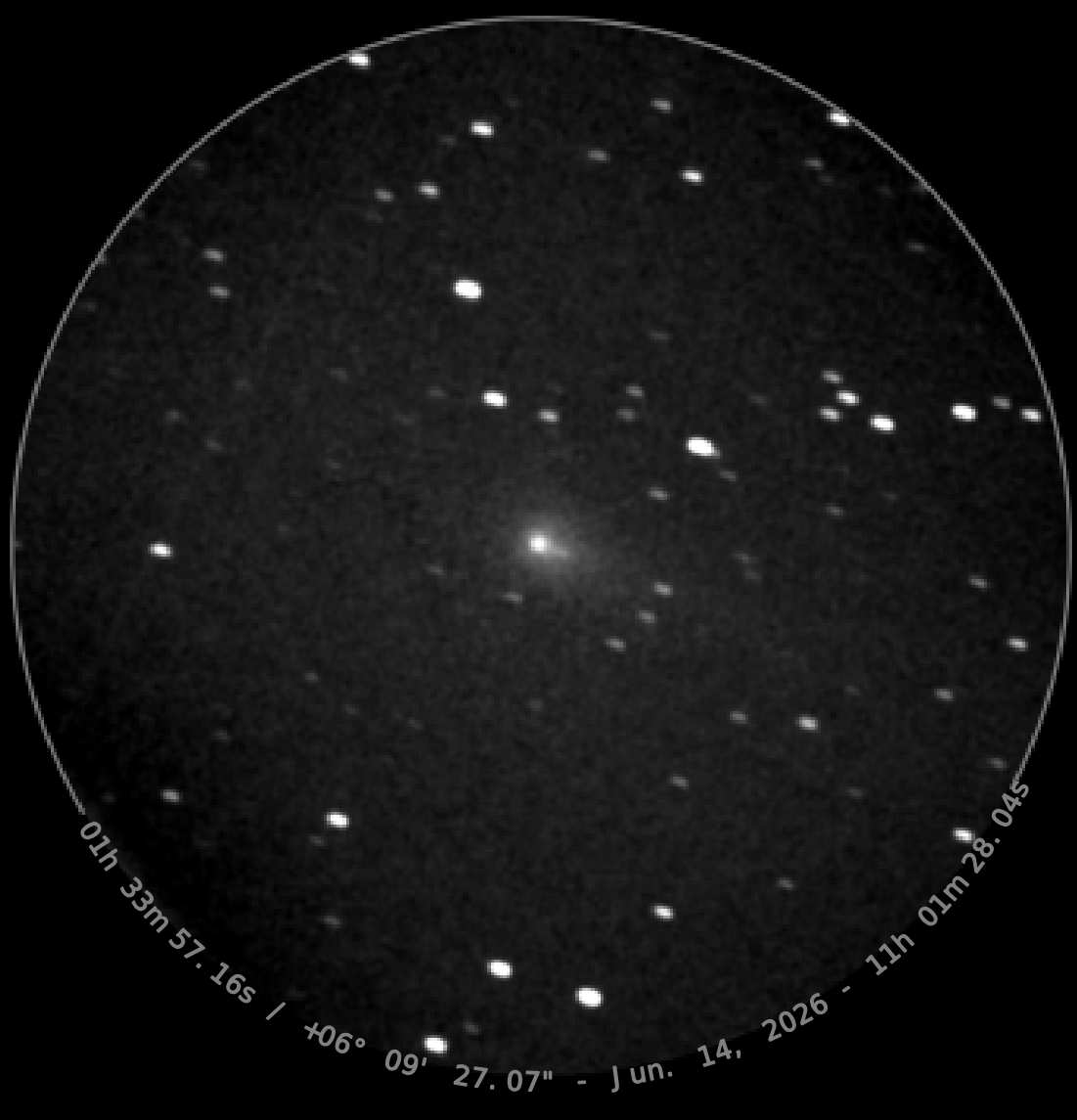
- 88P/Howell on 14 June 2026 at 11:01 UT imaged with a Unistellar 114mm smart telescope.

Discovery
- Discovered by: Ellen S. Howell
- Discovery site: Palomar Observatory
- Discovery date: 29 August 1981

Designations
- MPC designation: P/1981 Q1, P/1987 E1
- Alternative designations: 1981 X, 1987 VI, 1993 II; 1981k, 1987h, 1992c

Orbital characteristics
- Epoch: 9 June 2026 (JD 2461200.5)
- Observation arc: 71.26 years (Note: Observation arc from the Minor Planet Center database covering dates from 22 May 1955 until 25 August 2026.)
- Earliest precovery date: 22 May 1955
- Number of observations: 5,478
- Aphelion: 4.860 AU
- Perihelion: 1.358 AU
- Semi-major axis: 3.109 AU
- Eccentricity: 0.56327
- Orbital period: 5.482 years
- Inclination: 4.3819°
- Longitude of ascending node: 56.667°
- Argument of periapsis: 235.86°
- Mean anomaly: 14.788°
- Last perihelion: 18 March 2026
- Next perihelion: 8 September 2031
- T_{Jupiter}: 2.947
- Earth MOID: 0.344 AU
- Jupiter MOID: 0.475 AU

Physical characteristics
- Mean radius: 0.96 km (0.60 mi)
- Comet total magnitude (M1): 11.4
- Comet nuclear magnitude (M2): 13.9

88P/Howell is a Jupiter-family comet with a 5.5 year orbital period around the Sun. It is the only comet independently discovered by American astronomer, Ellen Howell.

== Observational history ==
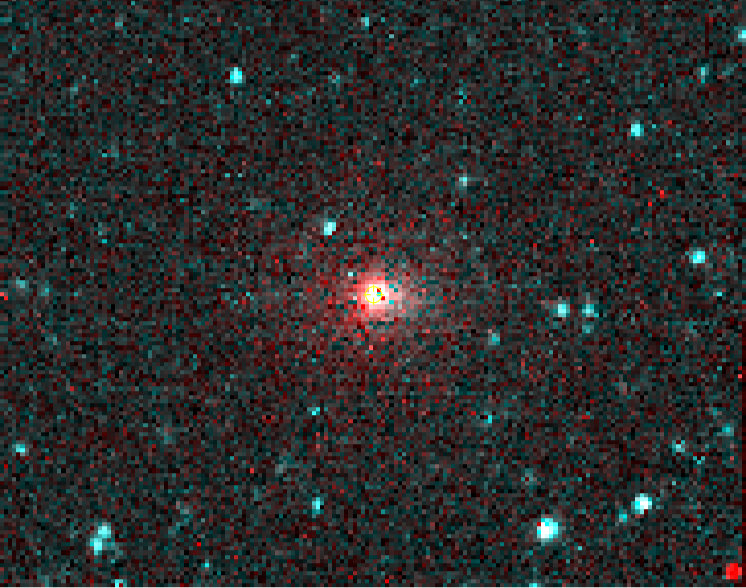
Infrared image of 88P/Howell taken by NEOWISE on 9 June 2020

It was discovered on 29 August 1981 by Ellen Howell. Alan C. Gilmore and Pamela M. Kilmartin recovered the comet ahead of its next apparition on 6 March 1987 as a diffuse 18th-magnitude object in the night sky. During the 2009 apparition the comet became as bright as apparent magnitude 8.

The comet most recently came to perihelion on 18 March 2026. It will next come to perihelion on 8 September 2031 and on 14 September 2031 it will pass 0.074 AU (11.1 million km; 6.9 million mi) from Mars. Between 2000–2050 the closest the comet will come to Earth is 0.76 AU (114 million km; 71 million mi) in June 2042.

During the 2020 apparition the comet reached about magnitude 9.

During the 2026 apparition 88P/Howell reached about magnitude 10. It crossed the Celestial equator on 19 May 2026 becoming more visible from the Northern hemisphere at magnitude 11.

== Orbit ==
As of 2026, 88P/Howell currently has an orbit that takes it between 1.36–4.86 AU (203–727 million km) from the Sun. Brian G. Marsden was the first to compute two orbital solutions for the comet in 8 September 1981, where he determined that the comet follows a periodic orbit around the Sun once every 5.94 years. Prior to discovery, 88P/Howell had a larger orbit until a close encounter with Jupiter reduced it after passing at a distance of 0.58 AU (87 million km) from the giant planet.

On 14 September 2031, it will pass 0.073 AU (10.9 million km) from Mars. (Note: For comparison, 3I/ATLAS passed about 0.194 AU (29.0 million km) from Mars on 3 October 2025, while C/2013 A1 (Siding Spring) flew by the Red Planet at a distance of 138,700 km (0.000927 AU) on 19 October 2014.)

== Physical characteristics ==
Initial estimates of the size of its nucleus place it roughly about 4.4 km (2.7 mi) in diameter. However, infrared observations from the Spitzer Space Telescope in 2006 reveal a smaller nucleus of only about 1.92 km (1.19 mi) in diameter.

== Proposed exploration ==
In response to the New Frontiers program call for Mission 4, a team from Applied Physics Laboratory (APL) submitted a mission concept proposal called the Comet Rendezvous, Sample Acquisition, Investigation, and Return (CORSAIR) that would perform a sample return from comet 88P/Howell. The mission proposed using a harpoon-based sample acquisition system while the spacecraft itself hovers a few meters above the comet's surface. In 2019, CORSAIR was ultimately not selected in favor of the Dragonfly mission to Titan.

In 2026, 88P/Howell is selected as a backup target for another proposed NASA/JPL sample-return mission called Gelato, which could launch and rendezvous to the comet by 2030 and 2038 respectively in case its primary target, 67P/Churyumov–Gerasimenko, is unreachable.

== Notes ==
Numbered comets
Previous; 87P/Bus	88P/Howell	Next; 89P/Russell
