= SS Empire Condor =

Two ships of the Ministry of War Transport carried the name Empire Condor.

- SS Empire Condor (1926)
- SS Empire Condor (1940)
