= Condor, Rio Grande do Sul =

Municipality in Brazil

Coordinates: 28°12′S 53°29′W

- Municipality
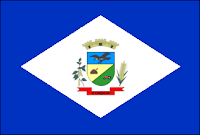
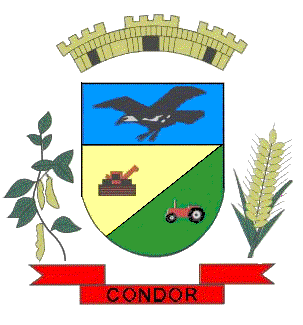
- Flag Coat of arms
- Interactive map of Condor, Rio Grande do Sul
- Country: Brazil
- Time zone: UTC−3 (BRT)

Condor is a municipality in the state of Rio Grande do Sul, Brazil. As of 2020, the estimated population was 6,759.

== See also ==
- List of municipalities in Rio Grande do Sul
