= Doppler tracking =

Doppler tracking. The Doppler effect allows the measurement of the distance between a transmitter from space and a receiver on the ground by observing how the frequency received from the transmitter changes as it approaches the transmitter, is overhead, and moves away.

When approaching, the frequency of the transmission appears to be higher and as the transmitter moves away, the frequency appears to be lower. When overhead, the transmitted frequency and the received frequency are the same.
