= El Cóndor, Jujuy =

Coordinates: 22°23′S 65°20′W

El Cóndor (Jujuy)
- Municipality and town
- Interactive map of El Cóndor (Jujuy)
- Country: Argentina
- Province: Jujuy Province
- Time zone: UTC−3 (ART)

El Cóndor (Jujuy) is a town and municipality in Jujuy Province in Argentina.
