= USS Condor =

USS Condor is a name used more than once by the U.S. Navy:

- USS Condor (AM-11), a Lapwing-class minesweeper, but construction of this ship was cancelled 4 December 1918
- USS Condor (AMc-14), built at Tacoma, Washington, in 1937
- USS Condor (AMS-5), laid down on 30 September 1942 by the Greenport Basin and Construction Company in Greenport, New York
