= Comet Nucleus Dust and Organics Return =

NASA sample-return mission concept to a comet

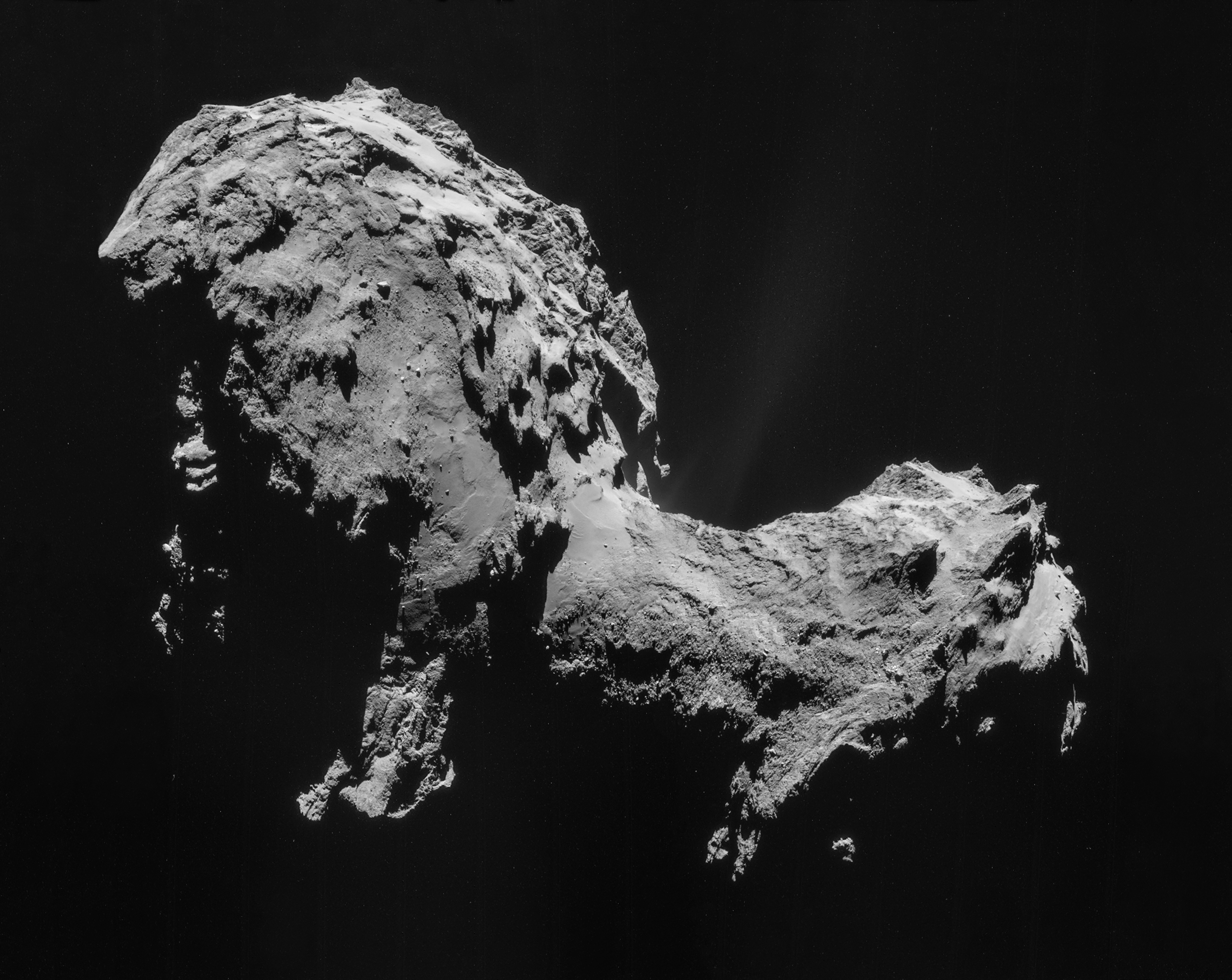
Greyscale photograph of Comet Churyumov–Gerasimenko taken by the Rosetta mission

Comet Nucleus Dust and Organics Return (CONDOR) is a mission concept to retrieve a sample from comet 67P/Churyumov–Gerasimenko to test ideas regarding Solar System formation, and accretion of rocky planets with habitable surface environments.

CONDOR is a concept by a NASA Jet Propulsion Laboratory team led by Christopher Guethe and M. Choukroun.

== Overview ==
The concept was proposed in 2017 to NASA's New Frontiers program to compete for their Mission 4, but it was not selected. Had it been developed and launched, CONDOR would collect and return a ≥ 50 g sample from the surface of comet 67P/Churyumov-Gerasimenko (also called simply 67P) for detailed analysis in terrestrial laboratories. This comet was previously investigated by the Rosetta mission between 2014 and 2016. The CONDOR concept calls for a Lockheed-Martin A2100 bus with a solar electric propulsion system.

OSIRIS-REx Sample Return Capsule in Utah as seen by the recovery team

In addition of performing a sample return down to 15 cm depth, it would carry a small payload comprising a narrow angle camera and a millimeter-wave radiometer to select a sampling site, and perform a gravity science investigation to compare changes of 67P since Rosetta. Following a survey for site selection, the sample retrieval would be a fast touch-and-go event. The sample would be stored at ≤ -20 °C and sent to Earth on a Stardust-based capsule for extensive analyses not yet possible by robotic spacecraft. The return trip is estimated to take 12.4 years.

Event	Proposed time table
Launch	16 June 2024
67P Arrival	25 April 2029
Reconnaissance	25 April 2029 – 31 March 2030
Sample acquisition	31 March 2030 – 9 September 2030
Departure to Earth	10 December 2033
Arrival to Earth	8 November 2036

== Science ==
The elements, except for hydrogen and helium, ultimately derive from stellar nucleosynthesis. The very basic chemical ingredients of life—the carbon-hydrogen molecule (CH, or methylidyne radical), the carbon-hydrogen positive ion (CH+) and the carbon ion (C+)—are the result, in large part, of ultraviolet light from stars. Complex molecules, including organic molecules, form naturally both in space and on planets. Links between these materials and Earth's prebiotic organic matter are unknown, and can only be probed on samples that contain pristine organic compounds. This mission would provide the first well-preserved sample from the outer Solar System to test ideas regarding Solar System formation, and accretion of rocky planets with habitable surface environments.

== See also ==
- Abiogenesis – Life arising from non-living matter
- Comet Rendezvous, Sample Acquisition, Investigation, and Return (CORSAIR) — A competing concept for New Frontiers 4
- List of missions to comets
- List of interstellar and circumstellar molecules
