= Condor Seamount =

Submarine mountain west-southwest of Faial Island in the Azores

The Condor Seamount is a submarine mountain located at 17 kilometres (11 mi) west-southwest of Faial Island in the Azores. It is approximately 1,800 metres (5,900 ft) high, 39 kilometres (24 mi) long and 23 kilometres (14 mi) wide, stretching from a depth of 185 metres (607 ft) up to 2,003 metres (6,572 ft). It is an elongated shaped volcano, oriented east-west, with the top relatively flat with smooth sedimentary flanks. Most seamounts lie in deep sea and/or open ocean, and thus are inaccessible and difficult to study. The Condor bank, constitutes an interesting case study due to its accessibility, located close to Faial island.

== History ==
Despite being relatively close to the shore of Faial Island, this seamount was only named in 1962. According to written statements, it was the crew of the tuna fishing boat "Condor", commanded by the captain Jaime Medeiros, from Pico Island, who found it, it following indications from an old French nautical chart, which indicated in this area depths with 230 m. The fishermen of that time remember exceptional abundances of fish, wreckfish and blackspot seabreams, especially at the beginning of the exploitation of the bank: "thousands of tones of fish that they got there ... there was so may wreckfish and seabreams… ... the blackspot seabreams would not let the bait hit the bottom...".

== Location ==
The Condor Seamount is located in the following geographic coordinates: latitude - 38°24′–38°38′N, longitude: 29°16′–28°51′W, having a surface area of 447 square kilometres (173 sq mi). On the west ridge, the shallowest zone of the Bank, the occurrence of rounded rocks indicate that this area was exposed to surface waves, when the sea level was approximately 120 metres (390 ft) below current levels.

== Scientific campaigns ==
The Condor Seamount was chosen as a study model, for several reasons: is representative of these sub aquatic Azorean ecosystems; their depths cover a good range of different biological communities; its relatively small size allows a thorough sampling of the different habitats; its accessibility facilitates periodic biological sampling campaigns. Since 2008, the Condor Seamount became the target of several scientific campaigns in order to increase the knowledge of their ecosystems and human activities that concern, with a view to their sustainable management, in order to serve as a model for other seamounts. It was an underwater observatory for monitoring and experimental multidisciplinary studies that involve a considerable number of researchers of Portuguese and international institutions. Demersal fishing is prohibited in the Condor Bank since June 2010 in order to allow the monitoring campaigns to continue to be made with reduced human influence. Thus, the Condor will be a reference area, which allows comparison with other areas where fishing occurs regularly, allowing, thus, increase the knowledge of the effects of protection on the exploitation of fish that inhabit the deep waters, particularly for species with commercial interest.

== Oceanography ==
The most important feature of the hydrodynamics of the Condor seamount is the presence of a mainstream coming from North, and a pattern of movement with rotation to the right (clockwise) over its Western Ridge. This pattern of movement can capture and retain nutrients and organisms from the outside of the Bank, in the area of 50–60 m above its top. This model can be interrupted by sporadic events of default elimination of movement, which can last up to a few months, encouraging the entry of new materials of the surrounding areas. Thus, the biological productivity of the area may change depending on oceanographic conditions.

== Biodiversity ==
The knowledge of the diversity of organisms that inhabit an area is a key requirement for the implementation of management and conservation measures. A list of species that live or visit the Condor Seamount is in preparation, using various sources of information, including field sampling, underwater observations and data provided by the users of the Condor. The number of animals identified in the Condor Seamount is around 900. Despite the identification work is still in progress there are species new to Science, others await description, and scientific name, particularly the species that live in the sediment.

=== Habitats ===
There are various habitats and biological communities in the Condor Seamount.

==== Coral gardens ====
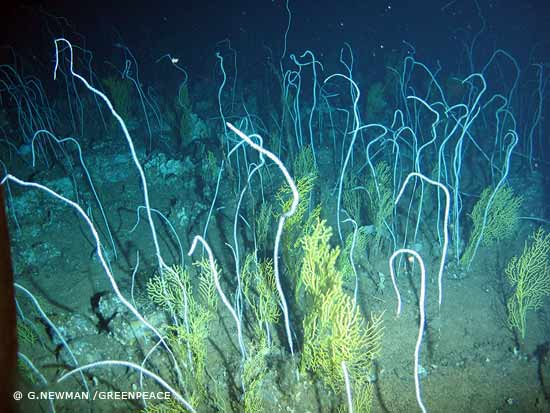
Condor Seamount Coral

The "coral" gardens of the Condor Seamount were discovered in 2006 during the Greenpeace campaign "Defending our Oceans". The underwater pictures recorded on the top of the seamount showed large and dense aggregations of gorgonians, dominated by coral-whip (Viminella flagellum) and yellow spiral gorgonian (Dentomuricea sp.), accompanied by several species of abundant coral that varied with its associated fauna. The Condor Seamount hosts dense "coral gardens," especially on the top, up to 300 m depth. The "gardens" are a habitat for many species, and are recognized internationally as habitats of importance to conservation. The gorgonians are an important part of by-catch of demersal longline fishing, due to the large size and complex structure of the colonies.

==== Aggregations of sponges ====
Between 700 and 900 m depth there are large aggregations of sponges in the Condor seamount. These aggregations are dominated by the presence of glass sponge (Pheronema carpenteri) and are also considered as habitats of conservation importance.

==== Sedimentary areas ====
The Condor seamount has sediment of various types, including those of volcanic origin, as well as sediments composed of organic matter derived from living organisms, that, in some areas, form thick plates, sometimes with 15 cm. These sediments can contain several species, including gorgonians, sponges and other organisms.

== Uses and activities ==
=== Fisheries ===
The Condor Bank fishing involves the bottom (demersal) and also pelagic fish species.

==== Bottom fishery ====
Fishing was the first activity practised in the Condor Bank, for demersal species, fishing with line and hooks (longlines and handlines). The available data for fisheries in the Condor cover the period between 1993 and 2009, and show that, over the years, the vessels using fishing longlines decreased the level of fishing effort, unlike using handline, that are increasing the effort. The vast majority of vessels that fished traditionally in the Condor are of Faial, and in lesser number from Pico island.

==== Tuna fishery ====
Fishing for tuna with rod and live bait addressed to various species of tuna, such as bigeye tuna (Thunnus obesus), and bonito (Katsowonus pelamis), is also practised at the Condor Bank, seasonally, between spring and autumn.

=== Maritime tourism ===
There are several tourist activities that are practised in the Condor seamount and surrounding areas

==== Big game fishing ====
Big game fishing is an activity practiced in the Azores essentially during the summer, aboard vessels properly equipped for this type of fishing with pole-and-line. The target species are the large pelagic fish such as blue marlin (Makaira nigricans), swordfish (Xiphias gladius) and various tuna. The occurrence of these species in the vicinity of the Condor Bank has been considered a preferred location for this type of fishing, since the 1980s, when it became more popular in the Azores.

==== Shark diving ====
The observation of sharks in their natural environment is an activity that has a growing economic importance, being generally made by scuba. This activity began experimentally around the Condor in 2009-2010, targeting species such as the blue shark (Prionace glauca) and the Shortfin Mako (Isurus oxyrinchus) and as having gained a remarkable importance in the region. The diving trips are made with boats that carry 6-8 divers and sharks are attracted with baits, but without being provided food. Data collected indicate that the Condor seamount is a very important area for this activity.

==== Whale watching ====
Despite the importance of the whale and dolphin watching in the Azores, this activity is not very popular near the Condor Bank, probably because of the distance from the islands and the fact that whales and dolphins can be observed near the coast of the islands without requiring a longer trips on open sea.

==== Research ====
The first scientific campaigns in Condor seamount were performed in the 1980s, but only since 2008 has research in this area greatly intensified. The development of the scientific Observatory, accompanied by the demersal fishing restrictions benefited greatly the scientific activities, favoring the emergence of several projects funded by various regional and international organizations.
