= List of missions to comets =

Missions to comets includes list of spacecraft that were launched to study comets. As of 2026, there have been twelve missions from United States, the Soviet Union, Japan, the European Space Agency and China.

== List of missions ==
Mission		Spacecraft	Launch date	Carrier rocket	Operator	Destination	Mission type	Outcome
1	Explorer 59	ICE (ISEE-3)	12 August 1978	Delta 2914	(United States) NASA / ESA	21P/Giacobini–Zinner	Flyby	Success
1	Explorer 59	Extended mission; Closest approach of 7,862 kilometres (4,885 mi) at 11:02 UTC on 11 September 1985. Also made distant observations of 1P/Halley in May 1986.						
2	Vega 1	5VK No.901	15 December 1984	Proton-K / D-1	Soviet Union	1P/Halley	Flyby	Success
2	Vega 1	Flew past Halley after visiting Venus; closest approach 8,889 kilometres (5,523 mi) at 07:20:06 UTC on 6 March 1986.						
3	Vega 2	5VK No.902	21 December 1984	Proton-K / D-1	Soviet Union	1P/Halley	Flyby	Success
3	Vega 2	Flew past Halley after visiting Venus; closest approach at 07:20 UTC on 9 March 1986.						
4	Sakigake	MS-T5	7 January 1985	Mu-3S-II	(Japan) ISAS	1P/Halley	Flyby	Success
4	Sakigake	Closest approach of 6.99 million kilometres (4.34 million miles) at 04:18 UTC on 11 March 1986.						
5	Giotto	Giotto	2 July 1985	Ariane 1	ESA	1P/Halley	Flyby	Success
5	Giotto	Giotto	2 July 1985	Ariane 1	ESA	26P/Grigg–Skjellerup	Flyby	Success
5	Giotto	Closest approach of 605 kilometres (376 mi) at 00:03:02 UTC on 14 March 1986. Extended mission to 26P/Grigg–Skjellerup. Closest approach of 200 kilometres (120 mi) at 15:30 UTC on 10 July 1992.						
6	Suisei	Suisei (PLANET-A)	19 August 1985	Mu-3S-II	(Japan) ISAS	1P/Halley	Flyby	Success
6	Suisei	Suisei (PLANET-A)	19 August 1985	Mu-3S-II	(Japan) ISAS	21P/Giacobini–Zinner	Flyby	Failure
6	Suisei	Closest approach of 152,400 kilometres (94,700 mi) at 13:06 UTC on 8 March 1986 Extended mission to 21P/Giacobini–Zinner, spacecraft ran out of fuel en route; flyby had been scheduled for 24 November 1998.						
7	Deep Space 1	Deep Space 1	24 October 1998	Delta II 7326	(United States) NASA	107P/Wilson–Harrington (Note: Wilson-Harrington is catalogued as both a comet and an asteroid.)	Flyby	Failure
7	Deep Space 1	Deep Space 1	24 October 1998	Delta II 7326	(United States) NASA	19P/Borrelly	Flyby	Success
7	Deep Space 1	Spacecraft was unable to reach Wilson–Harrington due to ion engine operation being suspended while a problem with the probe's star tracker was investigated. Extended mission to 19P/Borrelly was successful.						
8	Discovery 4	Stardust	7 February 1999	Delta II 7426	(United States) NASA	81P/Wild	Flyby	Success
8	Discovery 4	Stardust	7 February 1999	Delta II 7426	(United States) NASA	81P/Wild	Sample return	Success
8	Discovery 4	Stardust	7 February 1999	Delta II 7426	(United States) NASA	9P/Tempel	Flyby	Success
8	Discovery 4	Extended mission to 9P/Tempel, Stardust-NExT, to survey crater caused by Deep Impact.						
9	Discovery 6	CONTOUR	3 July 2002	Delta II 7425	(United States) NASA	2P/Encke	Flyby	Spacecraft failure
9	Discovery 6	CONTOUR	3 July 2002	Delta II 7425	(United States) NASA	73P/Schwassmann–Wachmann	Flyby	Spacecraft failure
9	Discovery 6	CONTOUR	3 July 2002	Delta II 7425	(United States) NASA	6P/d'Arrest	Flyby	Spacecraft failure
9	Discovery 6	Flyby to 6P/d'Arrest was provisionally scheduled at time of spacecraft's failure.						
10	Cornerstone 3	Rosetta	2 March 2004	Ariane 5G+	ESA / (Germany) DLE	67P/Churyumov–Gerasimenko	Orbiter	Success
10	Cornerstone 3	Philae	2 March 2004	Ariane 5G+	ESA / (Germany) DLE	67P/Churyumov–Gerasimenko	Lander	Success
10	Cornerstone 3	Rosetta entered orbit around 67P at 09:06 UTC on 6 August 2014. On 30 September 2016 mission ended in an attempt to slow land on the comet's surface near a 130 m (425 ft) wide pit called Deir el-Medina. Philae Came to rest on the surface of 67P at 17:32 UTC on 12 November 2014. Communications ceased with the loss of battery power at 00:36 UTC on 15 November 2014 and the lander began hibernating. Reactivated on solar power and briefly established contact with ground control again at 20:28 UTC on 13 June 2015, and sporadically until 9 July 2015 when the last communication was received.						
11	Discovery 7	Deep Impact	12 January 2005	Delta II 7925	(United States) NASA	9P/Tempel	Flyby	Success
11	Discovery 7	Deep Impact	12 January 2005	Delta II 7925	(United States) NASA	9P/Tempel	Impactor	Success
11	Discovery 7	Deep Impact	12 January 2005	Delta II 7925	(United States) NASA	103P/Hartley	Flyby	Success
11	Discovery 7	Impact occurred at 05:52 UTC on 4 July 2005. Extended mission (EPOXI).						
12	Tianwen-2	Tianwen-2	28 May 2025	Long March 3B	(China) CNSA	311P/PanSTARRS	Orbiter	Enroute
12	Tianwen-2	Scheduled for arrival in 2035.						

== Statistics ==
† First to achieve ‡ Joint first to achieve

Asteroid belt
Country/Agency	Flyby	Orbit	Impact	Lander	Sample return
United States	ICE, (21P/Giacobini–Zinner) 1978 ‡	—	Deep Impact, (Tempel 1) 2005 †	—	Stardust, (81P/Wild) 2006 †
ESA	ICE, (21P/Giacobini–Zinner) 1978 ‡	Rosetta, (67P/Churyumov–Gerasimenko) 2014 †	—	Philae, (67P/Churyumov–Gerasimenko) 2014 †	—
Soviet Union	Vega 1, (1P/Halley) 1986	—	—	—	—
Japan	Sakigake, (1P/Halley) 1986	—	—	—	—

== See also ==
- List of missions to minor planets (includes asteroids)
- List of minor planets and comets visited by spacecraft
- Timeline of Solar System exploration
  - List of missions to Venus
  - List of missions to the Moon
  - List of missions to Mars
  - List of missions to minor planets
- List of extraterrestrial orbiters
