= Condor Peak =

Mountain in California, United States

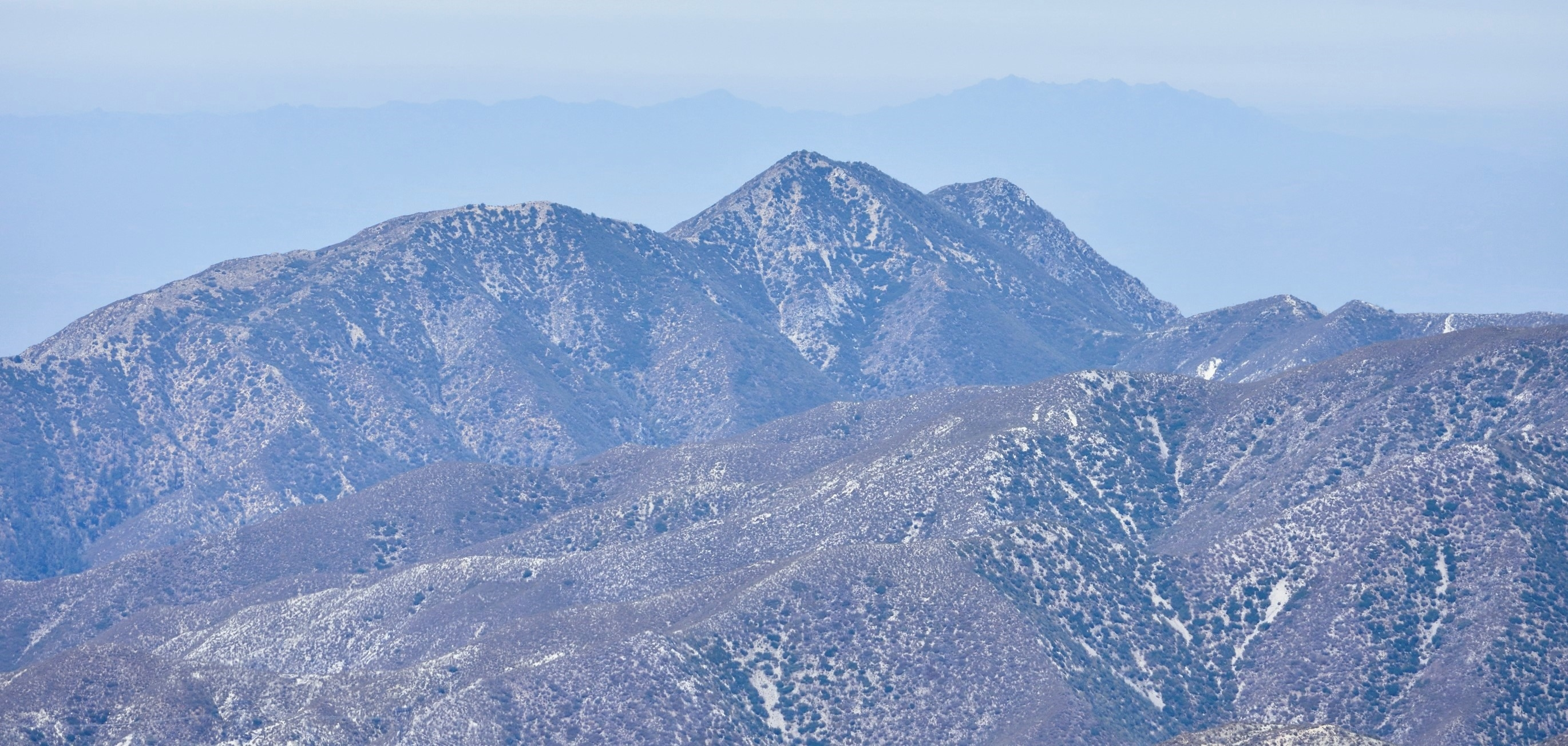
- East-northeast aspect

Highest point
- Elevation: 5,442 ft (1,659 m)
- Prominence: 670 ft (204 m)
- Parent peak: Iron Mountain (5,635 ft)
- Isolation: 1.70 mi (2.74 km)
- Listing: Hundred Peaks Section
- Coordinates: 34°19′32″N 118°13′08″W

Naming
- Etymology: California condor

Geography
- Location within California Location within the United States
- Country: United States
- State: California
- County: Los Angeles
- Protected area: San Gabriel Mountains National Monument
- Parent range: San Gabriel Mountains
- Topo map: USGS Condor Peak

Geology
- Mountain type: Fault block

Condor Peak is a 5,442-foot-elevation (1,659-meter) mountain summit located in the San Gabriel Mountains, in Los Angeles County, California, United States.

== Description ==
Condor Peak is set within San Gabriel Mountains National Monument, approximately 20 miles (32 km) north of downtown Los Angeles. The May 2, 2024, expansion of the San Gabriel Mountains National Monument by President Biden brought Condor Peak within the boundary of the monument. Topographic relief is significant as the summit rises over 2,200 feet (671 meters) above Ybarra Canyon in approximately one mile (1.6 km). Reaching the summit involves 14 miles of hiking with 4,260 feet of elevation gain. The mountain is named for the California condor which was common here in the early 1900s. This landform's toponym has been officially adopted by the U.S. Board on Geographic Names.

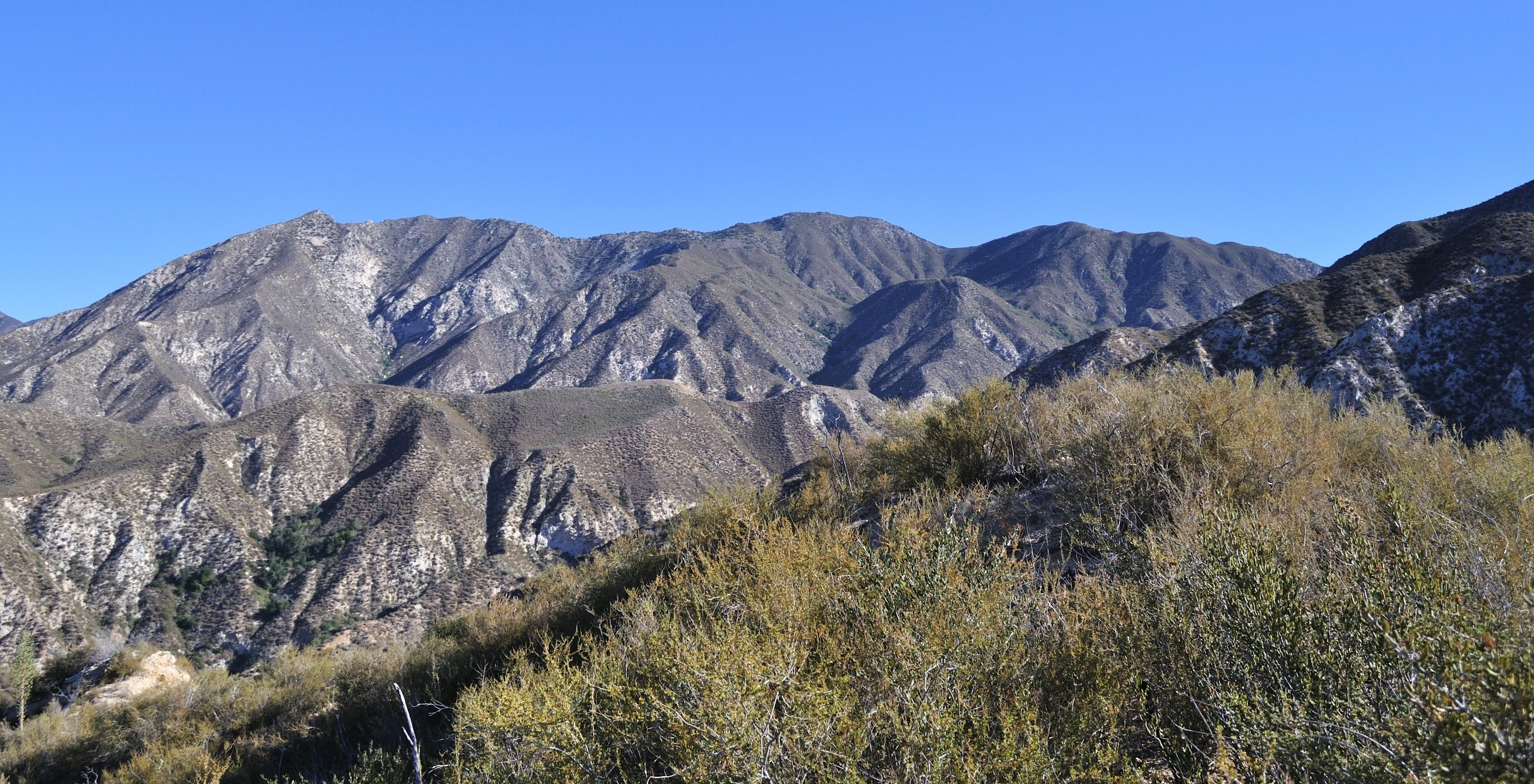
South aspect, summit centered

== Climate ==
According to the Köppen climate classification system, Condor Peak is located in a continental climate zone (Dsa) with mostly dry summers (except for scattered summer thunderstorms) and cold, wet winters. Most weather fronts originating in the Pacific Ocean travel east toward the San Gabriel Mountains. As fronts approach, they are forced upward by the peaks (orographic lift), causing them to drop their moisture onto the range. Precipitation runoff from this mountain's chaparral-covered slopes drains to Big Tujunga Creek.
