= Comet Encke =

Periodic comet

2P/Encke
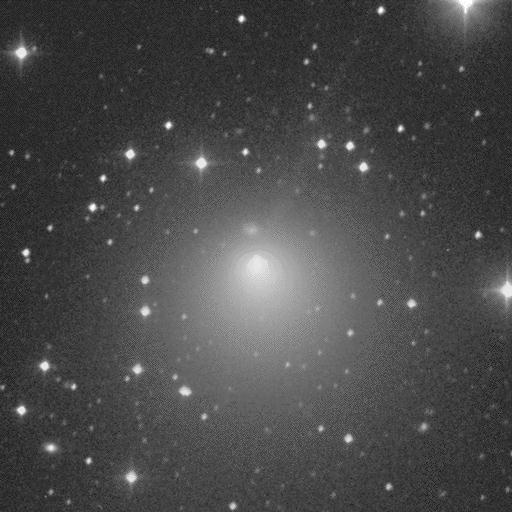
- Comet Encke photographed from the Kitt Peak Observatory on 5 January 1994

Discovery
- Discovered by: Pierre Méchain; Johann Franz Encke; (recognition of periodicity)
- Discovery date: 17 January 1786

Designations
- MPC designation: P/1786 B1, P/1795 V1; P/1805 U1, P/1818 W1; P/1822 L1
- Pronunciation: /ˈɛŋki/
- Alternative designations: 1786 I, 1795, 1805; 1819 I, 1822 II, 1825 III; 1829, 1832 I, 1835 II; 1838, 1842 I, 1845 IV

Orbital characteristics
- Epoch: 5 May 2025 (JD 2460800.5)
- Observation arc: 240.60 years (Note: Observation arc from the Minor Planet Center database only covered dates from 15 January 1852 until 24 August 2026 (174.61 years). This figure included its entire arc up to 17 January 1786.)
- Number of observations: 6,124
- Aphelion: 4.097 AU
- Perihelion: 0.339 AU
- Semi-major axis: 2.218 AU
- Eccentricity: 0.84711
- Orbital period: 3.304 years
- Max. orbital speed: 69.5 km/s (250,000 km/h)
- Inclination: 11.344°
- Longitude of ascending node: 334.01°
- Argument of periapsis: 187.28°
- Mean anomaly: 167.19°
- Last perihelion: 22 October 2023
- Next perihelion: 10 February 2027
- T_{Jupiter}: 3.023
- Earth MOID: 0.167 AU (25.0 million km)
- Jupiter MOID: 0.909 AU (136.0 million km)

Physical characteristics
- Mean diameter: 4.86 km (3.02 mi)
- Synodic rotation period: 11.083±0.003 hours
- Geometric albedo: 0.046
- Spectral type: (V–R) = 0.44±0.06
- Comet total magnitude (M1): 15.6

Comet Encke /ˈɛŋki/, or Encke's Comet (official designation: 2P/Encke), is a periodic comet that completes an orbit of the Sun once every 3.3 years. (Note: This is the shortest period for a reasonably bright comet; the faint main-belt comet 311P/PanSTARRS has a period of 3.2 years.) Encke was first recorded by Pierre Méchain on 17 January 1786, but it was not recognized as a periodic comet until 1819 when its orbit was computed by Johann Franz Encke. Like Halley's Comet, it is unusual in its being named after the calculator of its orbit rather than its discoverer. Like most comets, it has a very low albedo, reflecting only 4.6% of the light its nucleus receives, although comets generate a large coma and tail that can make them much more visible during their perihelion (closest approach to the Sun). The diameter of the nucleus of Encke's Comet is 4.86 km (3.02 mi).

It reached opposition on 8 October 2026 when it was about magnitude 15. It comes to perihelion on 10 February 2027 when it will have a solar elongation of 10 degrees.

== Discovery ==
As its official designation implies, Encke's Comet was the first periodic comet discovered after Halley's Comet (designated 1P/Halley). It was independently observed by several astronomers, the first two being Pierre Méchain and Charles Messier in 1786. It was next observed by Caroline Herschel in 1795 and was "discovered" for a third time by Jean-Louis Pons in 1818. Its orbit was calculated by Johann Franz Encke, who through laborious calculations was able to link observations of comets in 1786 (designated 2P/1786 B1), 1795 (2P/1795 V1), 1805 (2P/1805 U1) and 1818 (2P/1818 W1) to the same object. In 1819 he published his conclusions in the journal Correspondance astronomique, and predicted correctly its return in 1822 (2P/1822 L1). It was recovered by Carl Ludwig Christian Rümker at Parramatta Observatory on 2 June 1822.

Although named after Johann Encke, he himself insisted that the comet should be referred to as Pons's Comet instead, however this was not widely adopted.

== Orbit ==
Comets are in unstable orbits that evolve over time due to perturbations and outgassing. Given Encke's low orbital inclination near the ecliptic and brief orbital period of 3 years, the orbit of Encke is frequently perturbed by the inner planets. Encke is currently close to a 7:2 mean motion resonance with Jupiter, and it is possible that some of the larger fragments shed by the comet, or released by a larger progenitor of the comet, are trapped in this resonance.

Encke's orbit gets as close as 0.167 AU (25.0 million km; 15.5 million mi) to Earth (minimum orbit intersection distance). On 4 July 1997, Encke passed 0.19 AU (28 million km; 18 million mi) from Earth, and on 30 June 2172, it will make a close approach of roughly 0.17 AU (25 million km; 16 million mi). On 18 November 2013, it passed 0.02496 AU (3.734 million km; 2.320 million mi) from Mercury. Close approaches to Earth usually occur every 33 years.

2P/Encke closest Earth approach around 2172-Jun-30
Date of closest approach	Earth distance (AU)	Sun distance (AU)	Velocity wrt Earth (km/s)	Velocity wrt Sun (km/s)	Uncertainty region (3-sigma)	Reference
2172-Jun-30 ± 1 day	0.165 AU (24.7 million km; 15.3 million mi)	1.04 AU (156 million km; 97 million mi)	26.6	36.1	± 2 million km	Horizons

Comet Encke has a perihelion (closest approach to the Sun) of 0.34 AU (51 million km; 32 million mi), and at perihelion Comet Encke passes the Sun at 69.5 km/s (250,000 km/h). Between 1769 and 2103, Comet Encke's perihelion distance only varies from 0.330 AU (in 2050) and 0.347 AU (in 1782). Of the numbered comets less than 321P, only 96P/Machholz gets closer to the Sun.

== Observations ==
The comet has been observed at every perihelion since 1818 except 1944.

An attempt to photograph the comet close to aphelion was made on 2 July 1913 using the Mount Wilson 60-inch telescope but the resulting photographic plate was lost in the mail. A second attempt using the same telescope was made on 1 September 1913 and this showed an object in about the right position (1.5 arcminutes from its then predicted position) but orbital uncertainties made it impossible to be sure of its identity. A recalculation of Encke's orbit in the 1970s resulted in a calculated position only a few arcseconds (2.0 in ascension and 4.6 in declination) from the imaged object meaning the object probably was Encke.

In March 1918 the Greenwich 28-inch aperture telescope took observations of Encke (1917c).

An observer of Encke's in March 1918 had this to say of the comet on March 12, comparing to the early March 9 observation, "The comet much shaper, brighter, smaller; its diameter was 1 1/2', magnitude 7^{.}7 (B.D. scale). Its magnitude in the 6-inch Corbett was almost stellar, but in the 28 inch no definitive nucleus could be seen."

A number of attempts were made to image the comet around the aphelion of 3 September 1972. Elizabeth Roemer and G. McCorkle photographed the comet on 15 August. R.E. McCrosky and C.-Y. Shao photographed it on 5 September and Elizabeth Roemer this time with M.R. Gonzales photographed the comet on 13 September.

In 1980, Encke became the first comet to be detected by radar, which was conducted from the Arecibo Observatory to measure the size of its nucleus.

In April 1984 the Pioneer Venus Orbiter observed the comet in ultra-violet and made measurements of its rate of water loss.

Encke's Comet loses its tail

On 20 April 2007, STEREO-A observed the tail of Comet Encke to be temporarily torn off by magnetic field disturbances caused by a coronal mass ejection (a blast of solar particles from the Sun). The tail grew back due to the continuous shedding of dust and gas by the comet.

== Exploration ==
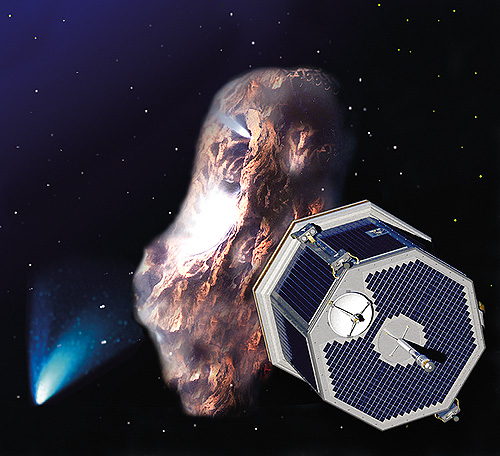
Artist's impression of the CONTOUR spacecraft making a flyby of a comet.

NASA’s failed Comet Nucleus Tour (CONTOUR) mission was planned to perform a flyby of Encke in November 2003, however it was destroyed shortly after sending itself into an interplanetary trajectory in August 2002.

=== Proposed missions ===
In the 1970s, the Goddard Space Flight Centre and Jet Propulsion Laboratory proposed to NASA probes that would fly past the comet in 1980. The Goddard Space Flight Centre's proposal was for a pair of probes launched directly towards the comet while the Jet Propulsion Laboratory plan was to use solar electric propulsion, or a Pioneer-class spacecraft. NASA did not attempt either mission.

Across the globe, the German DLR also proposed a mission towards Encke using a spacecraft derived from the Helios probes. However, like the NASA proposals, this mission was also not attempted.

== Meteor showers ==
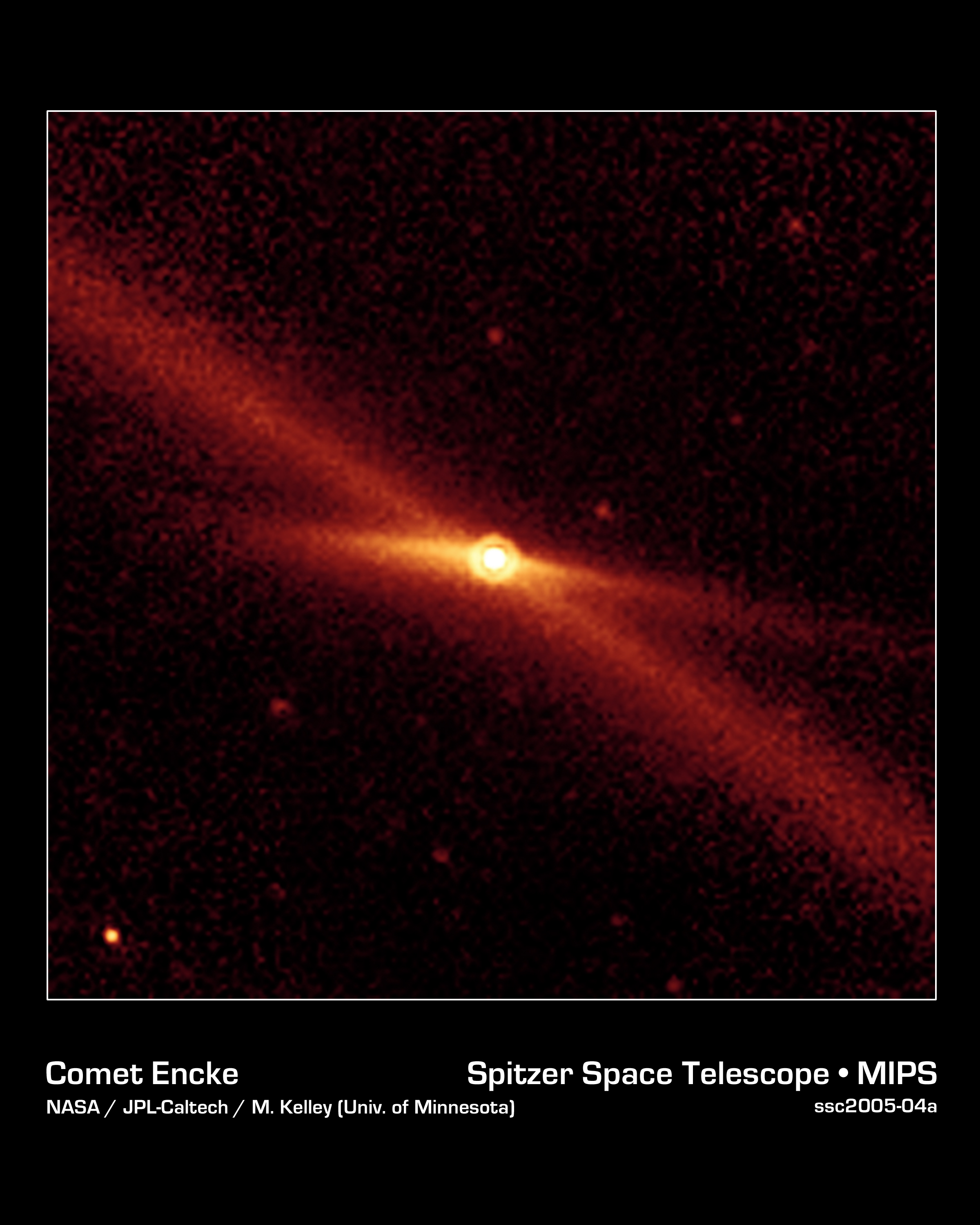
A Spitzer image of Encke and its debris trail in infrared light

Comet Encke is believed to be the originator of several related meteor showers known as the Taurids (which are encountered as the Northern and Southern Taurids across November, and the Beta Taurids in late June and early July). A shower has similarly been reported affecting Mercury.

The near-Earth asteroid (828534) 2004 TG10 is likely an inactive fragment of Encke that broke off the comet about 4,000–4,500 years ago.

=== Mercury ===
Measurements on board the NASA satellite MESSENGER have revealed Encke may contribute to seasonal meteor showers on Mercury. The Mercury Atmospheric and Surface Composition Spectrometer (MASCS) instrument discovered seasonal surges of calcium since the probe began orbiting the planet in March 2011. The spikes in calcium levels are thought to originate from small dust particles hitting the planet and knocking calcium-bearing molecules into the atmosphere in a process called impact vaporization. However, the general background of interplanetary dust in the inner Solar System cannot, by itself, account for the periodic spikes in calcium. This suggests a periodic source of additional dust, for example, a cometary debris field.

== Effects on Earth ==
More than one theory has associated Encke's Comet with impacts of cometary material on Earth, and with cultural significance.

The Tunguska event of 1908 may have been caused by the impact of a cometary body and has also been postulated by Slovak astronomer Ľubor Kresák as possibly caused by a fragment of Comet Encke.

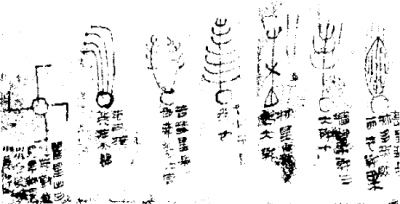
A Han Dynasty silk comet atlas, featuring drawings of comets believed by Victor Clube and Bill Napier to be related to the breakup of Encke's Comet in the past

A theory holds that the ancient symbol of the swastika appeared in a variety of cultures across the world at a similar time, and could have been inspired by the appearance of a comet from head on, as the curved jets would be reminiscent of the swastika shape (see Comets and the swastika motif). Comet Encke has sometimes been identified as the comet in question. In their 1982 book Cosmic Serpent (page 155) Victor Clube and Bill Napier reproduce an ancient Chinese catalogue of cometary shapes from the Mawangdui Silk Texts, which includes a swastika-shaped comet, and suggest that some comet drawings were related to the breakup of the progenitor of Encke and the Taurid meteoroid stream. Fred Whipple in his The Mystery of Comets (1985, page 163) points out that Comet Encke's polar axis is only 5 degrees from its orbital plane: such an orientation is ideal to have presented a pinwheel like aspect to our ancestors when Encke was more active.

Astronomers planned a 2019 search campaign for fragments of comet Encke which would have been visible from Earth as the Taurid swarm passed between July 5–11, and July 21 – August 10. There were no reports of discoveries of any such objects.

== Importance in the scientific history of luminiferous aether ==
Comet Encke (and Biela's Comet) had a role in scientific history in the generally discredited concept of luminiferous aether. As its orbit was perturbed and shortened, the shortening could only be ascribed to the drag of an "ether" through which it orbited in outer space. A 1860 school manual for example reads:

Astronomy furnishes evidence of the presence in space of a medium resisting the motion of the heavenly bodies. Encke's comet is found to lose about two days in each successive period of 1,200 days. Biela's comet, with twice that length of period, loses about one day. That is, the successive returns of these bodies is found to be accelerated by this amount. No other cause for this irregularity has been found but the agency of the supposed ether.

Encke's pole tumbles in an 81-year period, therefore it will accelerate for half that time, and decelerate for the other half of the time (since the orientation of the comets rotation to solar heating determines how its orbit changes due to outgassing forward or aft of the comet's course). The authors of this 1860 textbook of course could not know that the pole of the comet would tumble as it does over such a long period of time, or that outgassing would induce a thrust to change its course.

The supposed shortening of the orbit of Encke's Comet demonstrating the existence of ether was mentioned in Edgar Alen Poe's story, "The Unparalleled Adventures Of One Hans Pfaall".

== Gallery ==
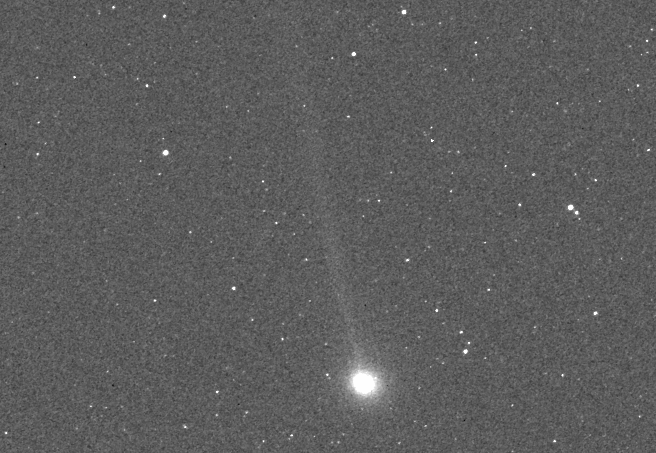
A MESSENGER image of Comet Encke at its closest approach to Mercury, 17/11/2013 (NASA/JHUAPL/Carnegie Institution of Washington)

== Bibliography ==
- Klačka, Jozef (1999). "Meteor Streams of Comet Encke. Taurid Meteor Complex". Abstract
- Whipple, F.L. (1940). "Photographic meteor studies. III. The Taurid shower." Proc. Amer. Phil. Soc., 83, 711–745.
- Master, S. and Woldai, T. (2004) The UMM Al Binni structure in the Mesopotamian marshlands of Southern Iraq, as a postulated late holocene meteorite impact crater : geological setting and new LANDSAT ETM + and Aster satellite imagery. Johannesburg, University of Witwatersrand, Economic Geology Research Institute (EGRI), 2004. EGRI - HALL : information circular 382, p. 21

http://www.itc.nl/library/Papers_2004/tech_rep/woldai_umm.pdf (1.56 MB)

- Master, S. and Woldai, T. (2004) Umm al Binni structure, southern Iraq, as a postulated late holocene meteorite impact crater : new satellite imagery and proposals for future research. Presented at the ICSU workshop : comet - asteroid impacts and human society, Santa Cruz de Tenerife, Canary Islands, Spain, November 27- December 2, 2004. p. 20
- Hamacher, D. W. (2005) "The Umm Al Binni Structure and Bronze Age Catastrophes", The Artifact: Publications of the El Paso Archaeological Society, Vol. 43
- Hamacher, D. W. (2006) "Umm al Binni lake: Effects of a possible Holocene bolide impact", Astronomical Society of Australia Meeting 40, #15

Numbered comets
Previous; 1P/Halley	2P/Encke	Next; 3D/Biela
