= Condor A350 =

Motorcycle model

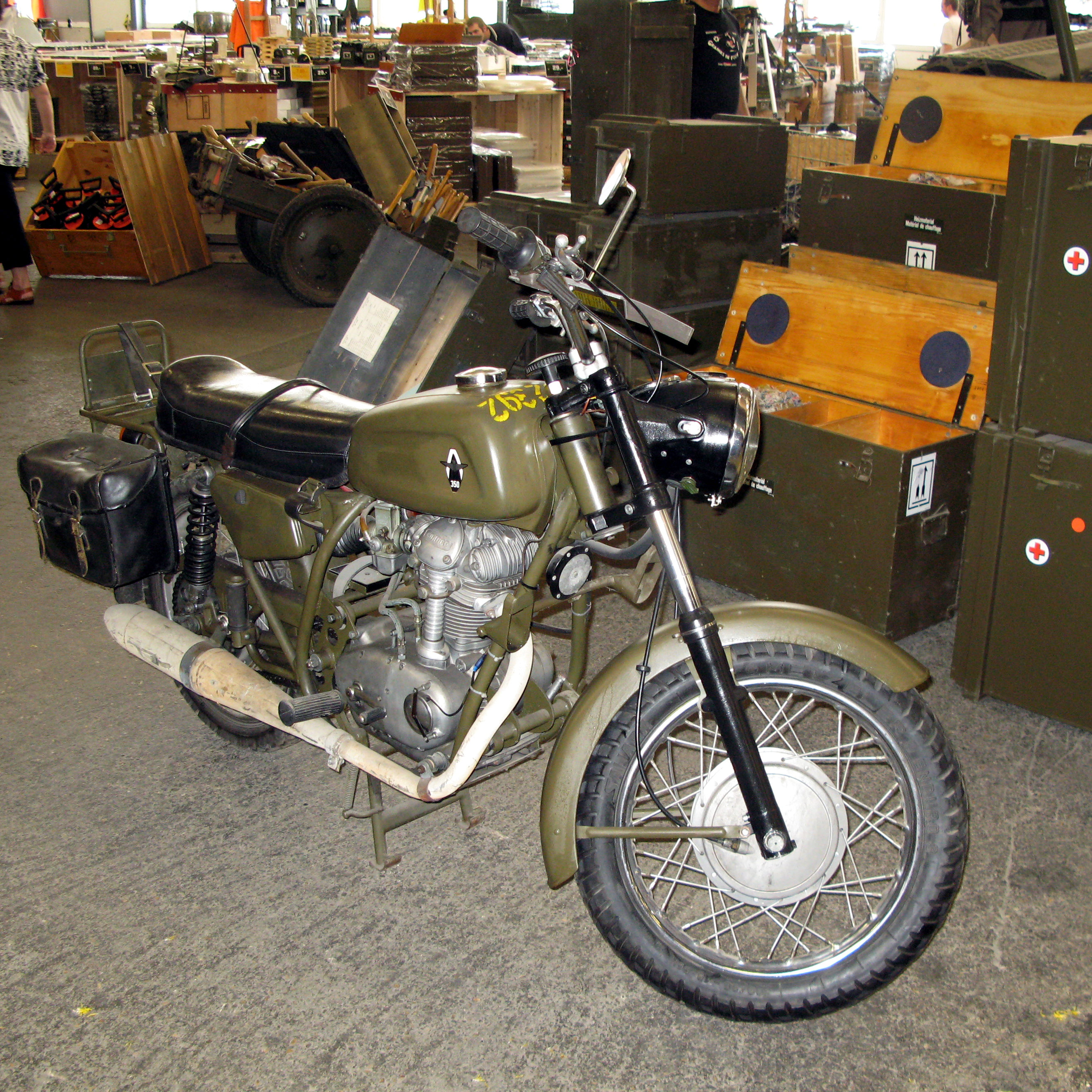
- Manufacturer: Condor-Werke AG
- Production: 1973–1978
- Assembly: Switzerland
- Brakes: Drum

Condor A350 was a Swiss military motorbike.

== Condor History ==
In 1893 Edouard Scheffer and Victor Donzelot made their first bike for the Swiss military in their new factory under the name Sheffer Freres. In 1899 the company picked a logo showing the large birds of the Andes, the Condor. Later the factory was renamed Condor-Werke AG. They produced civilian but more often government bikes until the 1990s. Some engines were built in house, but the last Swiss built engine was made in the early 1960s.

== The A350 engine ==
In 1967 Ducati's successful 350 scrambler engine was selected for use in the new Swiss military motorcycle. At first plans were to just import the engine block but later plans were changed to import the whole engine, although there was some Swiss tinkering. The exhaust port and assembly was made more robust. The steel exhaust pipe and muffler were built to run almost silently and the whole assembly is sprayed with aluminium. The oil filler cap changed to a longer tube to make filling easier. Compression was reduced to 8.2:1 so that the bike could run on poor quality fuel. The result is a reliable engine that made only 16.6 hp, and it will do about 70 miles per hour. The oil filter was mounted remotely.

== Frame and chassis ==
The forks were sourced from Marzocchi. Early models have Marzocchi rear shocks but later ones are fitted with Konis. Wheels and 200mm drum brakes from Grimeca, adequate for use on the Alps. Both rims are the same but the front tire is a 3.25x18” and the rear is a 3.50x18”. The headlight and a few other electrical components were supplied by Bosch. A major difference between the Swiss bike and the Italian was rubber mounting the engine – very different from the stressed member design. It was heavier but a lot smoother on the rider. One oddity is that the frame has a lug for a standard Ducati side stand, but one was never supplied by the factory.

== Accessories ==
The A350 comes with leather saddle bags and a few odd military accessories. One is the blackout light for night riding, and the other is mounts for two Stgw. 57 assault rifles. The side covers house a large air filter and spare bulbs and fuses in a foam block, and the other side contains a tool set, a lock, a cleaning brush, and goggles.

== Production ==
Condor made 500 A350s in 1973 and when the production run ended in 1978, 3000 had been made.
