= Castel C.34 Condor =

French glider, 1934

C.34 Condor

General information
- Type: High performance sailplane
- National origin: France
- Designer: R. Castello
- Number built: 2

History
- First flight: 1934

The Castel C.34 Condor was a French high performance sailplane. Two were built and one at least served French gliding clubs from 1935 to the outbreak of World War II in 1939.

== Design and development ==
The high performance Condor was financed by the Toulouse aero club Les Ailes (Wings) and designed by R. Castello for the use of J. Thomas, the director of the Black Mountain Regional Centre.

It had a one piece, cantilever high wing, which was straight-edged and strongly tapered (taper ratio 0.37) to roughly semi-elliptical tips. It had a single spar structure with a leading edge torsion box. Long, narrow ailerons, divided into two parts, filled the entire trailing edge; these could also act as camber-changing flaps for low speed flight.

The Condor's oval section fuselage was built around three longerons, two in the upper part and one, in the keel, which extended rearwards only as far as the rubber sprung landing skid, ending under the trailing edge. It was covered in stressed birch plywood. The forward fuselage was deep, with the wing on top and the single-seat cockpit ahead of the leading edge under a removable wooden cover with broad framed windows, limiting the pilot's view. Behind the wing the fuselage was slimmer and tapered to the tail, where a very small triangular fin carried a balanced rudder with an upright leading edge but which was full and rounded aft. The narrow tailplane, mounted forward of the rudder, carried balanced elevators.

== Operational history ==
The contemporary French journal Les Ailes first described the Condor in a June 1934 article that included images of the almost complete aircraft, suggesting it first flew about that time, though one modern source dates the aircraft from 1933. There is one modern report that the Condor crashed and was destroyed on its first flight, though contemporary sources do not mention this event. A second example was constructed by the Aéro-club de l'Est at Nancy over the winter of 1934–1935; they named it after one of their members, Jean Schmitt, who had died in a flying accident that spring. One improvement was a cockpit canopy with increased window area and better visibility. It remained active in the summer of 1937, flying from the nearby Plateau de Malzéville. In early 1939 it joined the L'Espoir Aeronautique at Sarreguemines, who renamed it in memory of a local (Lorraine) pilot, Albert Martin. It was active over the summer, but was seized by the German forces when they invaded France in 1940.

== Specifications ==
Data from Les Ailes June 1934

General characteristics

- Length: 7.00 m (23 ft 0 in)
- Wingspan: 13.30 m (43 ft 8 in)
- Height: 1.20 m (3 ft 11 in)
- Wing area: 13.60 m^{2} (146.4 sq ft)
- Aspect ratio: 13
- Airfoil: Göttingen 535 at root, modified at tips
- Empty weight: 85 kg (187 lb)
- Gross weight: 155 kg (342 lb)

Performance

- Maximum glide ratio: 1:24
- Wing loading: 11.5 kg/m^{2} (2.4 lb/sq ft)
