= List of craters on Venus =

- Lunar: 1,624 craters (31.2%)
- Venusian: 900 craters (17.3%)
- Mercurian: 397 craters (7.6%)
- Martian: 1,092 craters (21.0%)
- Others: 1,198 craters (23.0%)
Distribution of named craters in the Solar System as of 2017. (Note: The total number of named craters also includes names that have been dropped or not yet approved by IAU's Working Group for Planetary System Nomenclature (WGPSN))

This is a list of craters on Venus, named by the International Astronomical Union's (IAU) Working Group for Planetary System Nomenclature. All craters on Venus are named after famous women or female first names. (For features on Venus other than craters see, list of montes on Venus and List of coronae on Venus.)

As of 2017, there are 900 named craters on Venus, fewer than the lunar and Martian craters but more than on Mercury.

Other, non-planetary bodies with numerous named craters include Callisto (141), Ganymede (131), Rhea (128), Vesta (90), Ceres (90), Dione (73), Iapetus (58), Enceladus (53), Tethys (50) and Europa (41). For a full list, see List of craters in the Solar System.

== A ==
Crater	Coordinates	Diameter (km)	Approval Year	Eponym	Ref
Abigail	52.2°S 111.2°E	18.4	1994	Hebrew first name	WGPSN
Abika	52.5°S 104.4°E	14.5	1994	Mari first name	WGPSN
Abington	47.8°S 82.3°W	21.7	1994	Frances Abington, British actress	WGPSN
Abra	6.2°N 97.4°E	7.2	1997	Ewe first name	WGPSN
Adaiah	47.3°S 106.6°W	18	1994	Hebrew first name	WGPSN
Adamson	14.8°S 29.6°E	27.2	1994	Joy Adamson, Austrian naturalist	WGPSN
Addams	56.2°S 98.9°E	87	1994	Jane Addams, American social reformer	WGPSN
Adivar	8.9°N 76.2°E	30.3	1991	Halide Edib Adıvar, Turkish author	WGPSN
Adzoba	12.8°N 117°E	10	1997	Ewe first name	WGPSN
Aethelflaed	18.2°S 163.4°W	20	1994	Ethelfleda, Mercian queen	WGPSN
Afiba	47.1°S 102.7°E	9.5	1997	Ewe first name	WGPSN
Afiruwa	4.3°N 3.8°E	5.2	1997	Hausa first name	WGPSN
Aftenia	49.95°N 36°W	7	1997	Moldavian first name	WGPSN
Afua	15.5°N 124°E	10	1997	Akan first name	WGPSN
Aglaonice	26.4°S 20.1°W	63.7	1991	Aglaonice, Ancient Greek astronomer	WGPSN
Agnesi	39.4°S 37.7°E	42.4	1991	Maria Agnesi, Italian mathematician	WGPSN
Agoe	13.1°N 4.3°E	6.3	1997	Ewe first name	WGPSN
Agrippina	33.2°S 65.7°E	38.6	1991	Agrippina the Elder, Roman empress	WGPSN
Ahava	53.6°N 172.7°W	10.4	1997	Hebrew first name	WGPSN
Aigul	38.2°N 79.6°W	6	1997	Kalmykia first name	WGPSN
Ailar	15.8°S 68.4°E	8.2	1997	Turkman first name	WGPSN
Aimee	16.1°N 127.2°E	17	1994	French first name	WGPSN
Aisha	39.3°N 53.3°E	10.6	1997	Arabic first name	WGPSN
Aita	8.9°N 89.3°W	14	1994	Estonian first name	WGPSN
Akeley	8°N 115.5°W	23.4	1994	Delia Akeley, American explorer	WGPSN
Akhmatova	61.3°N 52.1°W	41.4	1985	Anna Akhmatova, Russian poet	WGPSN
Akiko	30.6°N 172.7°W	17.4	1994	Yosano Akiko, Japanese poet	WGPSN
Akosua	58.6°S 18.1°E	6.2	1997	Akan first name	WGPSN
Aksentyeva	42°S 88.1°W	42.5	1994	Zinaida Aksentyeva, Russian astronomer	WGPSN
Akuba	9.6°N 23°E	5.5	1997	Ewe first name	WGPSN
Al-Taymuriyya	32.9°N 23.9°W	19	1991	Ayesha Al-Taymuriyya, Egyptian author	WGPSN
Alcott	59.5°S 5.6°W	66	1991	Louisa May Alcott, American author	WGPSN
Alima	46°S 130.8°W	10.3	1994	Arabic first name	WGPSN
Alimat	29.5°S 154.1°W	13.5	1994	Osset first name	WGPSN
Alina	8.3°N 92.22°W	3.7	2009	Short form of French first name Adeline/Adelaide	WGPSN
Alison	4°S 165.6°E	14.4	1994	Irish first name	WGPSN
Alma	2.4°S 131.2°W	16.8	1994	Kazakh first name	WGPSN
Almeida	46.6°N 123.3°E	15.5	1985	Portuguese first name	WGPSN
Altana	1.4°N 69.9°E	6	1997	Kalmyk first name	WGPSN
Amalasuntha	11.5°S 17.6°W	15.4	1991	Amalasuntha, Ostrogoth queen	WGPSN
Amanda	29.2°S 94.5°E	12.5	1997	Latin first name	WGPSN
Amaya	11.3°N 89.4°E	34.5	1991	Carmen Amaya, Spanish dancer	WGPSN
Amelia	8.57°N 79.55°W	3.3	2009	Latin first name	WGPSN
Amenardes	15°N 54.3°E	27.9	1991	Amenardes, Egyptian princess	WGPSN
Aminata	6.6°N 25.2°E	9.7	1997	Mandinka first name	WGPSN
Anaxandra	44.2°N 162.3°E	20.4	1994	Anaxandra, Ancient Greek artist	WGPSN
Andami	17.5°S 26.5°E	28.9	1991	Azar Andami, Iranian physician and researcher	WGPSN
Andreianova	3°S 68.8°E	66.1	1994	Elena Andreianova, Russian ballerina	WGPSN
Anicia	26.3°S 31.3°E	38.2	1991	Anicia, Ancient Greek physician and poet (Note: The IAU cites Norma Olin Ireland's Index to the Women of the World as their source for the name "Anicia" as that of an ancient Greek poet; she gives it as an alternative name for Anyte of Tegea. Kate Campbell Hurd-Mead calls Anyte a physician on the basis of a story in Pausanias which tells of her curing a blind man after a visit from the god Asclepius.)	WGPSN
Annia Faustina	22.1°N 4.7°E	23.4	1991	Faustina the Younger, Roman empress	WGPSN
Antonina	28.1°N 106.8°E	13.8	1985	Russian first name	WGPSN
Anush	14.9°N 86.5°E	12.7	1994	Armenian and Persian first name	WGPSN
Anya	39.5°N 62.2°W	18.1	1985	Russian first name	WGPSN
Ariadne	43.9°N -0°E	23.6	1985	Greek first name	WGPSN
Asmik	3.9°N 166.4°E	19.5	1994	Armenian first name	WGPSN
Astrid	21.4°S 24.8°W	10.5	1991	Scandinavian first name	WGPSN
Audrey	23.8°N 11.9°W	15.2	1994	English first name	WGPSN
Aurelia	20.3°N 28.2°W	31.1	1991	Aurelia, mother of Julius Caesar	WGPSN
Austen	25°S 168.4°E	45.1	1994	Jane Austen, British novelist	WGPSN
Avene	40.4°N 149.4°E	10	1997	Akan first name	WGPSN
Avviyar	18°S 6.3°W	20.6	1991	Avviyar, ancient Tamil poet	WGPSN
Ayana	29.2°S 175.5°E	13.8	1994	Altay first name	WGPSN
Ayashe	22.7°N 31.4°E	6.7	1997	Hausa first name	WGPSN
Ayisatu	34.6°N 5.5°E	7	1997	Fula first name	WGPSN

back to top

== B ==
Crater	Coordinates	Diameter (km)	Approval Year	Eponym	Ref
Bachira	26.5°N 10°E	7.3	1997	Algerian first name	WGPSN
Badarzewska	22.6°S 137.2°E	29.6	1991	Tekla Bądarzewska-Baranowska, Polish composer	WGPSN
Bahriyat	50.3°N 2.5°W	5	1997	Kumyk first name	WGPSN
Baker	62.5°N 40.3°E	109	1994	Josephine Baker, American dancer	WGPSN
Bakisat	26°N 3.2°W	7.4	1997	Chechen first name	WGPSN
Balch	29.9°N 77.1°W	40	1994	Emily Balch, American economist	WGPSN
Ban Zhao	17.1°N 147°E	39	1991	Ban Zhao, Chinese historian	WGPSN
Baranamtarra	17.9°N 92.2°W	25.5	1994	Baranamtarra, Mesopotamian queen	WGPSN
Barauka	10.6°N 13.7°W	12.9	1997	Hausa first name	WGPSN
Barrera	16.6°N 109.4°E	27	1991	Oliva Sabuco, Spanish medical writer	WGPSN
Barrymore	52.3°S 164.3°W	56.6	1994	Ethel Barrymore, American actress	WGPSN
Barsova	61.3°N 137°W	76	1985	Valeria Barsova, Soviet singer	WGPSN
Barto	45.3°N 146.3°E	48	1985	Agniya Barto, Soviet poet	WGPSN
Barton	27.4°N 22.5°W	52.2	1991	Clara Barton, American Red Cross founder	WGPSN
Bascom	10.4°S 57.8°W	34.6	1994	Florence Bascom, American geologist	WGPSN
Bashkirtseff	14.7°N 166°W	36.2	1994	Marie Bashkirtseff, Russian painter and diarist	WGPSN
Bassi	19°S 64.6°E	31	1991	Laura Bassi, Italian physicist	WGPSN
Bathsheba	15.1°S 49.5°E	32.3	1994	Bathsheba, Hebrew queen	WGPSN
Batten	15.2°N 142.6°W	65	2000	Jean Batten, New Zealand aviator	WGPSN
Batya	72.7°N 124.6°W	9.3	1997	Hebrew first name	WGPSN
Beecher	13°N 106.6°W	40.4	1994	Catharine Beecher, American author	WGPSN
Behn	32.4°S 142°E	25.4	1991	Aphra Behn, British writer	WGPSN
Bender	13°S 32.6°W	39.8	1997	Heidi Julia Bender, American child author and artist (Note: Heidi Julia Bender was the author and illustrator of Cathy, Please Don't Move. Born in 1979, she lived in University Park, Maryland. (Heidi Bender, Cathy, Please Don't Move, Make a Wish Foundation, Winchester, Virginia (1989), p. 21 ). She died in 1991 of an inoperable tumor in her brain stem (Heidi Julia Bender (Obituary), The Washington Post, April 2, 1991).)	WGPSN
Berggolts	63.5°S 53°E	29.5	1994	Olga Berggolts, Russian poet	WGPSN
Bernadette	46.6°S 74.4°W	12.8	1994	French first name	WGPSN
Bernhardt	31.6°N 84.4°E	25.3	1985	Sarah Bernhardt, French actress	WGPSN
Bernice	40.7°S 14.8°E	12.6	1997	Greek first name	WGPSN
Berta	62°N 38°W	20	1985	Finnish first name	WGPSN
Bette	24.6°S 12.1°W	7.2	1994	German first name	WGPSN
Bickerdyke	82°S 171.3°E	36.3	1994	Mary Ann Bickerdyke, American nurse	WGPSN
Bineta	57.3°N 144.1°E	10.7	1997	Mandinka first name	WGPSN
Birute	36.1°N 32°E	22.3	1991	Lithuanian first name	WGPSN
Blackburne	11°N 176.1°W	30.5	1994	Anna Blackburne, British biologist	WGPSN
Blanche	9.3°S 157°E	12.3	2000	French first name	WGPSN
Blixen	60.1°S 145.7°E	20.8	1991	Karen Blixen, Danish writer	WGPSN
Bly	37.7°N 54.5°W	18.7	1994	Nellie Bly, American journalist	WGPSN
Boivin	4.3°N 60.5°W	20.4	1994	Marie Boivin, French medical researcher	WGPSN
Boleyn	24.4°N 139.9°W	70.4	1994	Anne Boleyn, English queen	WGPSN
Bonnevie	36.1°S 127°E	92.2	1991	Kristine Bonnevie, Norwegian biologist	WGPSN
Bonnin	6.3°S 117.6°E	28.5	1994	Gertrude Bonnin, aka Zitkala-Sa, Lakota social reformer	WGPSN
Boulanger	26.6°S 99.2°E	71.5	1991	Nadia Boulanger, French pianist	WGPSN
Bourke-White	21.2°N 147.9°E	33.6	1991	Margaret Bourke-White, American photo-journalist	WGPSN
Boyd	39.4°S 138.6°W	22	1994	Louise Arner Boyd, American explorer	WGPSN
Boye	9.6°S 67.7°W	28	1994	Karin Boye, Swedish writer	WGPSN
Bradstreet	16.5°N 47.7°E	36	1994	Anne Bradstreet, American poet	WGPSN
Bridgit	45.3°S 11.1°W	10	1991	Irish first name	WGPSN
Brooke	48.4°N 63.4°W	22.9	1985	Frances Brooke, English novelist	WGPSN
Browning	28.3°N 4.9°E	23.4	1985	Elizabeth Browning, British poet	WGPSN
Bryce	62.5°S 163°W	23.9	1994	Lucy Bryce, Australian medical pioneer	WGPSN
Buck	5.7°S 10.4°W	21.8	1991	Pearl S. Buck, American writer	WGPSN
Budevska	0.5°N 143.2°E	18	1991	Adriana Budevska, Bulgarian actress.	WGPSN
Bugoslavskaya	23°S 59.6°W	29.9	1994	Yevgenia Bugoslavskaya, Soviet astronomer.	WGPSN

back to top

== C ==
Crater	Coordinates	Diameter (km)	Approval Year	Eponym	Ref
Caccini	17.4°N 170.4°E	38.1	1994	Francesca Caccini, Italian composer	WGPSN
Caitlin	65.3°S 12°E	14.7	1994	Irish first name	WGPSN
Caiwenji	12.4°S 72.4°W	22.6	1994	Cai Wenji, Chinese poet	WGPSN
Caldwell	23.6°N 112.4°E	51	1994	Taylor Caldwell, American author	WGPSN
Callas	2.4°N 27°E	33.8	1991	Maria Callas, American singer	WGPSN
Callirhoe	21.2°N 140.7°E	33.8	1991	Callirhoe, Greek sculptor	WGPSN
Caroline	6.9°N 53.7°W	18	1994	French first name	WGPSN
Carr	24°S 64.3°W	31.9	1994	Emily Carr, Canadian artist	WGPSN
Carreno	3.9°S 16.1°E	57	1991	Teresa Carreño, Venezuelan pianist	WGPSN
Carson	24.2°S 15.9°W	38.8	1991	Rachel Carson, American biologist	WGPSN
Carter	5.3°N 67.3°E	17.5	1994	Maybelle Carter, American singer	WGPSN
Castro	3.4°N 126.1°W	22.9	1994	Rosalía de Castro, Galician poet	WGPSN
Cather	47.1°N 107°E	24.6	1985	Willa Cather, American novelist	WGPSN
Centlivre	19.1°N 69.6°W	28.8	1994	Susanna Centlivre, English actress	WGPSN
Chapelle	6.4°N 103.8°E	22	1991	Georgette Chapelle, American journalist	WGPSN
Chechek	2.6°S 87.7°W	7.2	1997	Tuvan first name	WGPSN
Chiyojo	47.8°S 95.7°E	40.2	1991	Chiyojo, Japanese poet	WGPSN
Chloe	7.4°S 98.6°E	18.6	1994	Greek first name	WGPSN
Cholpon	40°N 70°W	6.3	1997	Kyrgyz first name	WGPSN
Christie	28.3°N 72.7°E	23.3	1985	Agatha Christie, English author	WGPSN
Chubado	45.3°N 5.6°E	7	1997	Fulbe first name	WGPSN
Clara	37.5°S 124.7°W	3.2	2000	Latin first name	WGPSN
Clementina	35.9°N 151.4°W	4	2006	Portuguese form of Clementine, French first name	WGPSN
Cleopatra	65.8°N 7.1°E	105	1982	Cleopatra, Egyptian queen	WGPSN
Cline	21.8°S 42.9°W	38	1994	Patsy Cline, American singer	WGPSN
Clio	6.3°N 26.5°W	11.4	1997	Greek first name	WGPSN
Cochran	51.9°N 143.4°E	100	1985	Jacqueline Cochran, American aviator	WGPSN
Cohn	33.3°S 151.9°W	18.3	1994	Carola Cohn, Australian artist	WGPSN
Colleen	60.8°S 162.2°E	13.5	1994	Irish first name	WGPSN
Comnena	1.2°N 16.3°W	19.5	1994	Anna Comnena, Byzantine princess and writer	WGPSN
Conway	48.3°N 39°E	49.3	1994	Lady Anne Finch Conway, English natural scientist	WGPSN
Cori	25.4°N 72.9°E	56.1	1991	Gerty Cori, Czech biochemist	WGPSN
Corinna	22.9°N 40.6°E	19.2	1994	Corinna, Greek poet	WGPSN
Corpman	0.3°N 151.8°E	46	1994	Elisabeth Koopman Hevelius, Polish astronomer	WGPSN
Cortese	11.4°S 141.6°W	27.7	1994	Isabella Cortese, Italian physician	WGPSN
Cotton	70.8°N 59.8°W	48.1	1985	Eugénie Cotton, French physicist	WGPSN
Cunitz	14.5°N 9.1°W	48.6	1991	Maria Cunitz, Silesian astronomer	WGPSN
Cynthia	16.7°S 12.5°W	15.9	1991	Greek first name	WGPSN

back to top

== D ==
Crater	Coordinates	Diameter (km)	Approval Year	Eponym	Ref
d'Este	34.3°S 121.1°W	21.6	1994	Isabella d'Este, Italian noblewoman	WGPSN
Dado	13.9°S 87.6°E	11.2	1997	Fulbe first name	WGPSN
Dafina	28.6°N 115.9°W	5.5	1997	Albanian first name	WGPSN
Danilova	26.4°S 22.8°W	48.8	1991	Maria Danilova and Alexandra Danilova, Russian ballet dancers	WGPSN
Danute	63.5°S 56.5°E	12.3	1994	Lithuanian first name	WGPSN
Daphne	41.3°N 79.6°W	15.5	1994	Greek first name	WGPSN
Darline	19.3°S 127.4°W	13	1994	Anglo-Saxon first name	WGPSN
Dashkova	78.2°N 53.5°W	45.1	1985	Yekatrina Dashkova, Russian philologist	WGPSN
Datsolalee	38.3°N 171.8°E	17.5	1994	Datsolalee, Washoe artist	WGPSN
de Ayala	12.4°N 31.9°E	19	1994	Josefa de Ayala, Spanish painter	WGPSN
de Beausoleil	5°S 102.8°E	28.2	1994	Martine de Beausoleil, French earth science researcher	WGPSN
de Beauvoir	2°N 96.1°E	52.5	1991	Simone de Beauvoir, French writer	WGPSN
de Lalande	20.5°N 5°W	21.3	1991	Marie-Jeanne de Lalande, French astronomer	WGPSN
de Staël	37.4°N 35.7°W	25	1994	Anne de Staël, French writer	WGPSN
De Witt	6.5°S 84.4°W	20.7	1994	Lydia De Witt, American pathologist	WGPSN
Deborah	37.3°S 10.6°E	9.7	1997	Hebrew first name	WGPSN
Defa	32.2°N 11.3°E	8.5	1997	Fulbe first name	WGPSN
Degu	27.3°N 70.1°W	5.5	1997	Adygan first name	WGPSN
Deken	47.1°N 71.5°W	48	1985	Agatha Deken, Dutch novelist	WGPSN
Deledda	76°N 127.5°E	32	1985	Grazia Deledda, Italian novelist	WGPSN
Delilah	57.9°S 109.8°W	18.5	1994	Hebrew first name	WGPSN
Deloria	32°S 97.1°E	31.9	1991	Ella Deloria, Sioux Anthropologist	WGPSN
Dena	20.7°S 21.3°W	2.4	2000	Lithuanian first name	WGPSN
Denise	14.4°S 94.7°E	2	2006	Greek first name	WGPSN
Devorah	22.5°S 16.6°W	4.8	1994	Hebrew first name	WGPSN
Devorguilla	15.3°N 4°E	22.9	1991	Devorguilla Irish heroine	WGPSN
Dheepa	21.6°S 176.3°E	4.7	2000	Indian first name	WGPSN
Dickinson	74.6°N 177.2°E	67.5	1985	Emily Dickinson, American poet	WGPSN
Dinah	62.9°S 37.1°E	15.6	1994	Hebrew first name	WGPSN
Dix	37°S 31°W	63.3	1994	Dorothea Dix, American social activist	WGPSN
Dolores	51.4°N 158.4°W	12.6	1985	Spanish first name	WGPSN
Domnika	18.4°N 65.7°W	6.7	1997	Moldavian first name	WGPSN
Doris	2.3°N 90°E	14.5	1994	Greek first name	WGPSN
Dorothy	35.4°S 11.3°E	8.4	1997	Greek first name	WGPSN
du Chatelet	21.5°N 165°E	18.5	1994	Émilie du Châtelet, French mathematician, physicist	WGPSN
Duncan	68.1°N 68.3°W	40.3	1985	Isadora Duncan, American dancer	WGPSN
Dunghe	56.2°S 64.7°W	5.5	1997	Kalmyk first name	WGPSN
Durant	62.3°S 132.3°W	21.1	1994	Ariel Durant, American writer	WGPSN
Duse	82.5°S 2°W	30.4	1994	Eleonora Duse, Italian actress	WGPSN
Dyasya	5.1°N 62.4°W	7.8	1997	Nganasan (Samoyed) first name	WGPSN

back to top

== E ==
Crater	Coordinates	Diameter (km)	Approval Year	Eponym	Ref
Edgeworth	32.2°N 22.8°E	29	1985	Maria Edgeworth, Irish writer	WGPSN
Edinger	68.8°S 151.5°W	33.3	1994	Tilly Edinger, American geologist	WGPSN
Efimova	81°N 137°W	26.5	1985	Nina Simonovich-Efimova, Soviet painter	WGPSN
Eila	75°S 94.6°E	9.5	1997	Finnish first name	WGPSN
Eileen	22.8°S 127.3°W	16.1	1994	Irish first name	WGPSN
Eini	41.6°S 96.4°E	5.9	1997	Finnish first name	WGPSN
Elena	18.3°S 73.4°E	17.6	1994	Italian first name	WGPSN
Elenora	47.1°N 6.9°E	4.5	2003	German first name (variation of Eleanor)	WGPSN
Elizabeth	59.1°N 144.6°W	10.5	1997	Hebrew first name	WGPSN
Ellen	22.8°S 78.7°W	14.6	1997	German first name	WGPSN
Elma	10.1°S 91.1°E	10.2	1997	Finnish first name	WGPSN
Elza	34.4°S 84.1°W	18	1994	Latvian first name	WGPSN
Emilia	26.5°S 88.2°E	12.5	1997	Swedish first name	WGPSN
Emma	13.7°S 57.7°W	11.8	1997	German first name	WGPSN
Enid	16.4°N 7.9°W	9.2	1997	Celtic first name	WGPSN
Erika	72°N 175.4°E	10.5	1985	Hungarian, German first name	WGPSN
Erin	47°S 175.2°W	13.6	1994	Irish first name	WGPSN
Erinna	78°S 50.9°W	33.8	1994	Erinna, ancient Greek poet	WGPSN
Erkeley	43.9°N 103.3°E	8	1997	Altai first name	WGPSN
Ermolova	60.3°N 154.4°E	60.9	1985	Maria Yermolova, Russian actress	WGPSN
Erxleben	50.9°S 39.4°E	31.6	1991	Dorothea Christiane Erxleben, German physician	WGPSN
Escoda	18.2°N 149.5°E	19.6	1994	Josefa Llanes Escoda, Philippine social reformer	WGPSN
Esmeralda	64.4°N 104.5°E	9.8	1997	Roma first name	WGPSN
Estelle	1.1°N 93.7°E	18.8	1994	Latin first name	WGPSN
Esterica	36.8°N 3.6°E	3.6	2003	Romanian first name	WGPSN
Esther	19.4°N 21.8°E	17.6	1994	Persian first name	WGPSN
Eudocia	59.1°S 158°W	27.5	1994	Aelia Eudocia, ancient Roman noblewoman	WGPSN
Eugenia	80.6°N 105.4°E	6	1997	Greek first name	WGPSN
Evangeline	69.6°N 138.1°W	16	1994	Greek first name	WGPSN
Evelyn	61.2°S 147.7°W	18	1997	Celtic first name	WGPSN
Evika	5.1°S 31.4°E	20.3	1994	Tatar first name	WGPSN
Ezraela	57°N 173.2°W	7.8	1997	Hebrew first name	WGPSN

back to top

== F ==
Crater	Coordinates	Diameter (km)	Approval Year	Eponym	Ref
Faiga	4.9°N 170.9°E	9.6	1994	Anglo-Saxon first name	WGPSN
Faina	71.1°N 100.7°E	10	1997	Russian first name	WGPSN
Farida	4.8°N 39°E	18	1994	Muslim first name from Arabic	WGPSN
Fatima	17.8°S 31.9°E	14.5	1994	Arabic first name	WGPSN
Faufau	18.8°N 8.3°E	7.8	1997	Polynesian first name	WGPSN
Fava	0.7°S 87.4°E	9.7	1997	Dunghan (Kyrgyzstan) first name	WGPSN
Fazu	32.4°N 106°E	6.1	1997	Avarian (Daghestan) first name	WGPSN
Fedorets	59.7°N 65.6°E	57.6	1985	Valentina Aleksandrovna Fedorets, Soviet astronomer	WGPSN
Felicia	19.8°S 133.5°W	11.5	1994	Latin first name	WGPSN
Ferber	26.4°N 12.9°E	23.1	1991	Edna Ferber, American writer	WGPSN
Fernandez	76.2°N 17.2°E	23.7	1985	Maria Antonia Fernandez, Spanish actress	WGPSN
Ferrier	15.7°N 111.3°E	29.1	1991	Kathleen Ferrier, English contralto singer	WGPSN
Feruk	64°S 107.6°E	8.3	1997	Nivkhi (Sakhalin Isl.) first name	WGPSN
Festa	11.5°N 27.2°E	35.3	1991	Italian painter	WGPSN
Fiona	5°N 166.6°E	3.5	2003	Celtic first name	WGPSN
Firuza	51.8°N 108°E	6	1997	Persian first name	WGPSN
Flagstad	54.3°S 18.9°E	39.2	1991	Kirsten Flagstad, Norwegian opera singer	WGPSN
Florence	15.2°S 85°E	10.5	1997	English first name	WGPSN
Flutra	68.4°S 112°E	6	1997	Albanian first name	WGPSN
Fossey	2°N 171.3°W	30.4	1994	Dian Fossey, American primatologist	WGPSN
Fouquet	15.1°S 156.5°W	47.8	1994	Marie Fouquet, French medical writer and charity worker	WGPSN
Francesca	28°S 57.7°E	17	1994	Italian first name	WGPSN
Frank	13.1°S 12.9°E	22.7	1991	Anne Frank, German diarist	WGPSN
Fredegonde	50.5°S 93.3°E	25.2	1991	Fredegund, Frankish queen	WGPSN
Frida	68.2°N 55.6°E	21.6	1985	Swedish first name	WGPSN
Frosya	29.5°N 113.4°E	9.8	1997	Russian first name	WGPSN
Fukiko	23.1°S 105.8°E	13.9	1994	Japanese first name	WGPSN

back to top

== G ==
Crater	Coordinates	Diameter (km)	Approval Year	Eponym	Ref
Gabriela	17.8°S 119.6°W	17.5	1994	Hebrew first name	WGPSN
Gahano	80.2°S 77.4°E	4.5	1997	Seneca first name	WGPSN
Gail	16.1°S 97.5°E	10	2006	Hebrew first name	WGPSN
Galina	47.6°N 52.9°W	16.8	1985	Bulgarian first name	WGPSN
Galindo	23.3°S 101.2°W	23.8	1994	Beatrix Galindo, Spanish physician and educator	WGPSN
Gautier	26.3°N 42.8°E	59.3	1994	Judith Gautier, French poet and novelist	WGPSN
Gaze	17.9°N 119.8°W	33.3	1994	Vera Gaze, Soviet astronomer	WGPSN
Gentileschi	45.2°N 99.4°W	20.5	1994	Artemisia Gentileschi, Italian painter	WGPSN
Georgina	20.4°S 58.8°E	5.9	1997	Greek first name	WGPSN
Germain	37.9°S 63.7°E	35.5	1991	Sophie Germain, French mathematician, physicist, and philosopher	WGPSN
Giliani	72.9°S 142.1°E	19.9	1994	Alessandra Giliani, fictional Italian anatomist	WGPSN
Gillian	15.2°S 50.1°E	14.7	1994	Latin first name	WGPSN
Gilmore	6.7°S 132.8°E	21.3	1994	Mary Gilmore, Australian poet and journalist	WGPSN
Gina	78.1°N 76.5°E	14.6	1985	Italian first name	WGPSN
Giselle	11.8°S 62°W	10.4	1997	French first name	WGPSN
Glaspell	58.4°S 90.4°W	26.3	1994	Susan Glaspell, American writer	WGPSN
Gloria	68.5°N 94.2°E	20.7	1985	Portuguese first name	WGPSN
Godiva	56.1°S 108.4°W	30.7	1994	Lady Godiva Mercian noblewoman	WGPSN
Goeppert-Mayer	59.7°N 26.8°E	33.5	1991	Maria Goeppert-Mayer, German theoretical physicist	WGPSN
Golubkina	60.3°N 73.5°W	28.4	1985	Anna Golubkina, Soviet sculptor	WGPSN
Goncharova	63°S 97.7°E	30.3	1994	Natalia Goncharova, Russian avant-garde artist	WGPSN
Grace	13.8°S 91.1°W	19	1994	Greek first name	WGPSN
Gražina	72.4°N 22.5°W	16.5	1994	Lithuanian first name	WGPSN
Greenaway	22.9°N 145.1°E	93	1991	Kate Greenaway, English children's book illustrator and writer	WGPSN
Gregory	7.1°N 95.8°E	18	1994	Isabella Augusta Gregory, Irish dramatist	WGPSN
Gretchen	59.7°S 147.7°W	20.8	1994	German first name	WGPSN
Grey	52.4°S 30.6°W	50	1994	Lady Jane Grey, English noblewoman and de facto monarch of England for 9 days	WGPSN
Grimke	17.2°N 144.7°W	34.8	1994	Sarah Grimké, American social reformer	WGPSN
Guan Daosheng	61.1°S 178.2°W	43.6	1994	Guan Daosheng, Chinese painter and calligrapher	WGPSN
Gudrun	10.6°N 33.6°W	13.3	1994	Norse first name	WGPSN
Guilbert	58°S 13.6°E	25.5	1991	Yvette Guilbert, French cabaret singer and actress	WGPSN
Gulchatay	20.5°N 64.5°W	9	1997	Arabic first name	WGPSN
Gulnara	23.7°S 174°E	5	1997	Persian first name	WGPSN
Guzel	57.6°S 61.3°W	7.3	1997	Turkish first name	WGPSN
Gwynn	9.7°N 37.2°E	32	1994	Nell Gwyn, Long-time mistress of King Charles II of England	WGPSN

back to top

== H ==
Crater	Coordinates	Diameter (km)	Approval Year	Eponym	Ref
Hadisha	39°S 97.2°E	8.9	1997	Kazakh first name	WGPSN
Halima	28.5°N 14.6°E	8.9	1997	Hausa first name	WGPSN
Halle	19.8°S 145.5°E	21.5	1991	Wilhelmina Halle (Wilma Neruda), Austrian violinist	WGPSN
Hamuda	62.9°N 2.5°E	15.8	2000	Hebrew first name	WGPSN
Hanka	27.3°S 114.3°E	5	1997	Czech first name	WGPSN
Hannah	17.9°N 102.6°E	19.8	1994	Hebrew first name	WGPSN
Hansberry	22.7°S 35.9°W	26.6	1994	Lorraine Hansberry, American playwright	WGPSN
Hapei	66.1°N 178°E	4.2	1997	Cheyenne (Oklahoma) first name	WGPSN
Hayashi	53.8°N 116.1°W	43.1	1985	Hayashi Fumiko, Japanese writer	WGPSN
Heather	6.8°S 25.9°W	11.5	1994	English first name	WGPSN
Heidi	23.6°N 9.9°W	15.2	1994	First name, form of Hester.	WGPSN
Helga	10.4°S 116.7°E	8.8	1997	Norwegian first name.	WGPSN
Hellman	4.7°N 3.7°W	34.7	1991	Lillian Hellman, American playwright	WGPSN
Heloise	40°N 51.9°E	38	1994	Heloise, French physician	WGPSN
Helvi	12.4°N 82.7°E	12.2	1997	Estonian first name.	WGPSN
Henie	51.9°S 146°E	70.4	1991	Sonja Henie, Norwegian figure skater	WGPSN
Hepworth	5.1°N 94.7°E	62.6	1991	Barbara Hepworth, English sculptor (1903–1975).	WGPSN
Higgins	8.1°N 118.7°W	40	1994	Marguerite Higgins, American journalist (1920–1966).	WGPSN
Hilkka	69°S 72°E	10.3	1997	Finnish first name.	WGPSN
Himiko	19°N 124.3°E	36.6	1991	Himiko, Japanese queen (4th century).	WGPSN
Hiriata	15.3°N 23.5°E	5	1997	Polynesian first name.	WGPSN
Hiromi	35.2°N 72.7°W	6	1997	Japanese first name.	WGPSN
Holiday	46.7°S 12.8°E	27.7	1991	Billie Holiday, American singer (1915–1959).	WGPSN
Horner	23.4°N 97.7°E	25.2	1991	Mary Horner, English naturalist, geologist (19th century).	WGPSN
Howe	45.7°S 174.8°E	38.6	1994	Julia Howe, American biographer, poet (1819–1910).	WGPSN
Hsueh Tʻao	52.6°S 13.8°E	21	1994	Hsüeh Tʻao, Chinese poet, artist (c. AD 760).	WGPSN
Hua Mulan	86.8°N 22.3°W	24	1991	Hua Mulan, Chinese warrior (c. AD 590).	WGPSN
Huang Daopo	54.2°S 165.3°E	29.1	1991	Huang Daopo, Chinese engineer.	WGPSN
Huarei	15°N 32.3°E	8.5	1997	Polynesian first name.	WGPSN
Hull	59.4°N 96.4°W	47.3	1994	Peggy Hull, American war correspondent (1889–1967).	WGPSN
Hurston	77.6°S 94.7°E	52.4	1994	Zora Hurston, American writer, anthropologist (1891–1960).	WGPSN
Hwangcini	6.3°N 141.8°E	30.2	1991	Hwang Jini, Korean poet (16th century)	WGPSN

back to top

== I ==
Crater	Coordinates	Diameter (km)	Approval Year	Eponym	Ref
Icheko	6.6°N 97.9°E	5.9	1997	Evenk/Tungu first name	WGPSN
Ichikawa	61.6°S 156.3°E	31.4	1994	Fusae Ichikawa, Japanese feminist (1893–1981).	WGPSN
Ilga	12.4°S 52.7°W	10.8	1994	Latvian first name.	WGPSN
Imagmi	48.4°S 100.7°E	7.6	1997	Eskimo (Chukotka) first name.	WGPSN
Indira	64.1°N 70.2°W	16.6	1985	Hindu first name.	WGPSN
Ines	67.1°S 118.1°W	11.2	1997	First name, Galician-Portuguese and Spanish version of Agnes.	WGPSN
Inga	38.1°N 133.4°W	10	1997	Danish first name.	WGPSN
Ingrid	12.4°S 51.1°W	11.5	1994	Scandinavian first name.	WGPSN
Inira	43.1°S 120.6°W	16.5	1994	Eskimo first name.	WGPSN
Inkeri	28.3°S 136.1°W	10.1	1997	Finnish first name.	WGPSN
Iondra	10.5°N 73.5°W	7.9	1997	Selkup (Samoyed) first name.	WGPSN
Iraida	27.8°N 108.1°E	6.5	1997	Greek first name.	WGPSN
Irene	49.8°N 134°E	13.6	1994	Greek first name.	WGPSN
Irina	35°N 91.2°E	15.2	1985	Russian first name.	WGPSN
Irinuca	51.4°N 121.9°E	8	1997	Romanian first name.	WGPSN
Irma	50.9°S 122°E	9.5	1997	Finnish first name.	WGPSN
Isabella	29.8°S 155.8°W	175	1994	Isabella I of Castile, Spanish queen (1451–1504).	WGPSN
Isako	9°S 82°W	13.5	1994	Japanese first name.	WGPSN
Isolde	74.5°S 148.1°W	11.9	1997	English first name.	WGPSN
Istadoy	51.8°S 132.6°E	5.4	1997	Tajik/Persian first name.	WGPSN
Ivka	68.2°N 56.2°W	14.9	1985	Serbo-Croatian first name.	WGPSN
Ivne	27°S 132.8°E	9	1997	Koryak (Kamchatka) first name.	WGPSN
Izakay	12.3°S 149.2°W	10.2	1997	Mari first name.	WGPSN
Izudyr	53.9°S 135.2°E	6.6	1997	Mari (Volga Finn) first name.	WGPSN

back to top

== J ==
Crater	Coordinates	Diameter (km)	Approval Year	Eponym	Ref
Jaantje	46.5°N 123°E	7.8	1997	Dutch first name.	WGPSN
Jacqueline	70.1°S 123.6°E	16.5	1994	French first name.	WGPSN
Jadwiga	68.4°N 91°E	12.7	1985	Polish first name.	WGPSN
Jalgurik	42.3°S 125.1°E	7.5	1997	Evenk/Tungu first name.	WGPSN
Jamila	45.8°N 134.8°E	7.9	1997	Afghan first name.	WGPSN
Jane	60.5°S 55.2°W	10.2	1997	Hebrew first name.	WGPSN
Janice	87.3°N 98.1°W	10	1997	English first name.	WGPSN
Janina	2°S 135.7°E	9.3	1997	Polish first name.	WGPSN
Janyl	28°S 138.8°E	5.6	1997	Kyrgyz first name.	WGPSN
Jasmin	15.6°N 61.6°E	15.1	2000	Arabic first name.	WGPSN
Jeanne	40.1°N 28.5°W	19.4	1985	French first name.	WGPSN
Jennifer	4.6°S 99.8°E	9.6	1994	Greek first name.	WGPSN
Jerusha	22°S 17.3°W	17.2	1994	Hebrew first name.	WGPSN
Jex-Blake	65.4°N 169.3°E	31.6	1991	Sophia Jex-Blake, British pioneer woman physician (1840–1912).	WGPSN
Jhirad	16.8°S 105.6°E	50.2	1994	Jerusha Jhirad, Indian physician.	WGPSN
Jitka	61.9°S 70.9°E	13	1997	Czech first name.	WGPSN
Jocelyn	33.2°S 83.6°W	14	1994	German first name.	WGPSN
Jodi	35.7°S 68.7°E	10.2	1997	English first name.	WGPSN
Johanna	19.5°N 112.7°W	15.1	1994	Hebrew first name.	WGPSN
Johnson	51.8°N 105.4°W	24.5	1994	Amy Johnson, Australian aviator (1903–1941).	WGPSN
Joliot-Curie	1.6°S 62.4°E	91.1	1991	Irène Joliot-Curie, French physicist, Nobel laureate (1897–1956).	WGPSN
Joshee	5.5°N 71.3°W	37	1994	Anandibai Joshee, Indian pioneer physician (1865–1887).	WGPSN
Juanita	62.8°S 90°E	19.3	1994	Spanish first name.	WGPSN
Judith	29.1°S 104.5°E	16.6	1994	Hebrew first name.	WGPSN
Julie	51°N 117.4°W	13.5	1985	Czech, German first name.	WGPSN
Jumaisat	15.1°S 135.6°E	7.5	1997	Kumyk (Daghestan) first name.	WGPSN
Jutta	0°N 142.6°E	7	1997	Finnish first name.	WGPSN

back to top

== K ==
Crater	Coordinates	Diameter (km)	Approval Year	Eponym	Ref
Kafutchi	26.7°N 16.4°E	7.1	1997	Bantu first name.	WGPSN
Kahlo	59.9°S 178.9°E	35.6	1994	Frida Kahlo, Mexican artist (1910–1954).	WGPSN
Kaikilani	32.8°S 163.2°E	19.9	1994	Kaikilani, first female ruler of Hawaii, (c. 1555).	WGPSN
Kaisa	13.5°N 66.7°W	12	1997	Finnish first name.	WGPSN
Kala	1.5°N 45.6°W	17.4	1994	Koryak (Kamchatka) first name.	WGPSN
Kalombo	30.5°S 34°E	9.6	1997	Bantu first name.	WGPSN
Kanik	32.5°S 110.1°W	16.5	1994	Sakhalin first name.	WGPSN
Karen	12.4°S 17.7°E	10.5	1997	Greek first name.	WGPSN
Karo	21.9°N 37.2°E	7	1997	Maori first name.	WGPSN
Kartini	57.8°N 27°W	23.4	1991	Kartini, Javanese educator (1879–1904).	WGPSN
Kastusha	28.6°S 59.9°E	13	1997	Mordovian (Volga River Finn, Russia) first name.	WGPSN
Katrya	29.5°S 108.7°E	9.2	1997	Ukrainian first name.	WGPSN
Katya	57.8°N 74.3°W	10.5	1997	Russian first name.	WGPSN
Kauffman	49.4°N 27.1°E	25.5	1985	Angelica Kauffman, German painter (1741–1807).	WGPSN
Kavtora	59°N 23.3°E	9.8	1997	Afghan first name.	WGPSN
Kelea	8.9°N 25.6°E	24.5	1994	Chiefess of Maui, Keleanohoanaʻapiʻapi (c. 1450).	WGPSN
Kelila	52.6°N 168.2°W	5	1997	Hebrew first name.	WGPSN
Kelly	4.8°S 0.8°W	11.2	1994	Gaelic first name.	WGPSN
Kemble	47.7°N 14.9°E	23.6	1985	Fanny Kemble, English actress (1809–1893).	WGPSN
Kenny	44.4°S 88.9°W	52.7	1994	Elizabeth Kenny, Australian nurse, therapist (1880–1952).	WGPSN
Ketzia	3.9°N 59.5°W	14.6	1997	Hebrew first name.	WGPSN
Khadako	54.2°N 139.3°E	7.4	1997	Nenets (Samoyed) first name.	WGPSN
Khafiza	6°N 60.8°W	7	1997	Arabic first name.	WGPSN
Khatun	40.3°N 87.2°E	44.1	1985	Mihri Khatun, Turkish poet (1456–1514).	WGPSN
Khelifa	1.5°S 129.9°E	10.8	1994	Arabic first name.	WGPSN
Kimitonga	25.1°S 48.3°E	5	1997	Polynesian first name.	WGPSN
Kingsley	22.6°S 53.6°W	26.6	1994	Mary Kingsley, English explorer, writer (1862–1900).	WGPSN
Kiris	20.9°N 98.8°E	13.3	1994	Latvian first name.	WGPSN
Kitna	28.9°S 82.7°W	15.3	1994	Kamchatka first name.	WGPSN
Klafsky	20.7°S 171.9°W	25.5	1994	Katharina Klafsky, Hungarian opera singer (1855–1896).	WGPSN
Klenova	78.1°N 104.5°E	141	1985	Maria Klenova, Soviet marine geologist (c. 1910–1978).	WGPSN
Kodu	0.9°N 21.3°W	10.5	1997	Wolof (W. Africa, Senegal) first name.	WGPSN
Koidula	64.2°N 139.6°E	67	1985	Lydia Koidula, Estonian poet(1843–1886).	WGPSN
Koinyt	30.9°S 66.8°W	11.7	1997	Nivkh (E. Siberia) first name.	WGPSN
Kollado	61°S 53.4°E	5.5	1997	Fulbe first name.	WGPSN
Kollwitz	25.2°N 133.6°E	29.1	1991	Kathe, German artist (1867–1945).	WGPSN
Konopnicka	14.5°N 166.6°E	20.1	1994	Maria Konopnicka Polish poet (1842–1910).	WGPSN
Kosi	43.9°S 54.9°E	7.7	1997	Ewe first name.	WGPSN
Kristina	65.2°S 44.1°W	9.7	1997	Slavonic form of Christiana, Latin first name.	WGPSN
Kumba	26.3°N 27.3°W	11.4	1997	Fulbe (W. Africa, Guinea) first name.	WGPSN
Kumudu	61.3°N 154.1°E	4.4	1997	Singalese first name.	WGPSN
Kuro	7.8°N 57.6°E	8.8	1997	Fulbe first name.	WGPSN
Kyen	6.2°S 64.7°E	5.2	1997	Bantu first name.	WGPSN
Kylli	41.1°N 67°E	13.2	1997	Finnish first name.	WGPSN

back to top

== L ==
Crater	Coordinates	Diameter (km)	Approval Year	Eponym	Ref
La Fayette	70.2°N 107.6°E	39.6	1985	Marie la Fayette.	WGPSN
Lachappelle	26.7°N 23.3°W	36.8	1991	Marie Lachappelle, French medical researcher (1769–1821).	WGPSN
Lagerlöf	81.2°N 74.8°W	56	1985	Selma Lagerlöf, Swedish novelist (1858–1940).	WGPSN
Landowska	84.6°N 74.3°E	33	1985	Wanda Landowska, Polish harpsichordist (1877–1959).	WGPSN
Langtry	17°S 155°E	50.3	1994	Lillie Langtry, English actress (1853–1929).	WGPSN
Lara	4.2°S 2.9°E	3.4	1997	Latin first name.	WGPSN
Larisa	18.47°S 131.06°E	3.7	2007	Latin first name.	WGPSN
Laulani	68.2°S 121.2°E	12.4	1994	Hawaiian first name.	WGPSN
Laura	48.9°N 141.2°E	17.2	1985	Spanish, Italian first name.	WGPSN
Laurencin	15.4°S 46.5°E	29.8	1994	Marie Laurencin, French painter (1885–1956).	WGPSN
Lazarus	52.9°S 127.2°E	24.2	1994	Emma Lazarus, American poet (1849–1887).	WGPSN
Leah	34.2°S 172.2°W	12	1994	Hebrew first name.	WGPSN
Lebedeva	45.2°N 49.8°E	37.4	1994	Sarah Lebedeva, Soviet sculptor (1881–1968).	WGPSN
Lehmann	44.1°S 39.1°E	21.7	1991	Inge Lehmann, Danish geophysicist (1888–1993).	WGPSN
Leida	23.3°S 93.4°W	18.8	1994	Estonian first name.	WGPSN
Leila	44.2°S 86.8°E	18.8	1994	Arabic first name.	WGPSN
Lena	39.5°N 23°E	15.2	1985	Russian first name.	WGPSN
Lenore	38.7°N 67.8°W	15.5	1994	Greek first name (form of Helen).	WGPSN
Leona	3.1°S 169°E	3	2000	Greek first name.	WGPSN
Leonard	73.8°S 174.8°W	31.7	1994	Wrexie Leonard, American assistant to P. Lowell (1867–1937).	WGPSN
Leslie	11.2°S 13.5°E	7.2	1997	English first name.	WGPSN
Letitia	34.5°N 71.3°W	17.5	1994	Latin first name.	WGPSN
Leyster	1°N 100°W	45.8	1994	Judith Leyster, Dutch painter (1609–1660).	WGPSN
Lhagva	75.8°S 59.9°W	7.9	1997	Mongolian first name.	WGPSN
Li Qingzhao	23.7°N 94.6°E	22.8	1991	Li Qingzhao, Chinese essayist, scholar (1085–1151).	WGPSN
Lida	36.6°N 86.1°W	20.3	1991	Russian first name.	WGPSN
Lilian	25.6°N 24°W	13.5	1994	Hebrew first name.	WGPSN
Liliya	30.2°N 31.1°E	15	1985	Russian first name.	WGPSN
Lind	50.2°N 5°W	25.8	1985	Jenny Lind, Swedish singer (1820–1887).	WGPSN
Linda	12.4°S 2.8°E	7.1	1997	Latin first name.	WGPSN
Lineta	5°S 5.9°W	15.6	1994	Latvian first name.	WGPSN
Lisa	29°N 178°W	4.5	2006	Hebrew first name, short form of Elizabeth.	WGPSN
Liv	21.1°S 56.1°W	11.2	1997	Norwegian first name.	WGPSN
Loan	28.3°N 60°E	7.4	1997	Vietnamese first name.	WGPSN
Lockwood	32.9°S 51.6°E	22	1994	Belva Lockwood, American lawyer, feminist (1830–1917).	WGPSN
Lois	17.9°S 145.3°W	13.5	1994	Greek first name.	WGPSN
Lonsdale	55.6°N 137.6°W	43	1994	Kathleen Lonsdale, English physicist, crystallographer (1903–1971).	WGPSN
Loretta	19.7°S 157.4°W	13.5	1994	Latin first name.	WGPSN
Lotta	51.1°N 24.1°W	11.8	1985	Swedish first name.	WGPSN
Lu Zhi	42.6°S 56.6°W	8.3	1997	Chinese first name.	WGPSN
Lucia	62.1°S 67.8°E	16	1994	Latin first name.	WGPSN
Lullin	23°N 81.3°E	25.1	1991	Maria Lullin, (1751–1822) wife of the Swiss entomologist François Huber (1750–1831).	WGPSN
Lydia	10.7°N 19.3°W	15.2	1994	Greek first name.	WGPSN
Lyon	66.5°S 89.4°W	12.4	1994	Mary Lyon, American educator, college president (1797–1849).	WGPSN
Lyuba	1.6°N 76.1°W	12.4	1997	Russian first name.	WGPSN
Lyudmila	62.1°N 30.3°W	14.1	1985	Russian first name.	WGPSN

back to top

== M ==
Crater	Coordinates	Diameter (km)	Approval Year	Eponym	Ref
Ma Shouzhen	35.7°S 92.5°E	18.9	1994	Ma Shouzhen, Chinese poet, painter (1592–1628).	WGPSN
Maa-Ling	14.7°S 0.5°W	6	1994	Chinese first name.	WGPSN
MacDonald	30°N 120.7°E	17.6	1994	Flora MacDonald, Scottish Jacobite.	WGPSN
Madeleine	4.7°S 66.8°W	16	1994	French first name.	WGPSN
Madina	22.7°N 58°E	6.3	1997	Kabarda first name.	WGPSN
Mae	40.5°S 14.8°W	7.5	1997	Greek first name, form of Margaret. Possibly named for engineer, physicist, and NASA astronaut Mae Jemison, the first African American woman to travel into space.	WGPSN
Magda	67°N 30.3°W	10.1	1985	Danish first name.	WGPSN
Magdalena	11.2°S 48.7°E	11.5	1997	Spanish form of Hebrew first name.	WGPSN
Magnani	58.6°N 22.8°W	26.4	1985	Anna Magnani.	WGPSN
Mahina	2°S 177.8°W	15.4	1994	Hawaiian first name.	WGPSN
Makola	3.8°S 106.7°E	16.6	1994	Hawaiian first name.	WGPSN
Maltby	23.3°S 119.7°E	36.6	1994	Margaret Maltby, American physicist (1860–1944).	WGPSN
Mamajan	65.1°S 102.7°W	2	1997	Turkman first name from Persian.	WGPSN
Mansa	33.9°S 63.4°E	8.1	1997	Akan first name.	WGPSN
Manton	9.3°N 26.9°E	20.5	1994	Sidnie Manton, English zoologist (1902–1980); Irene Manton, botanist (1904–1988).	WGPSN
Manzolini	25.6°N 91.3°E	41.8	1991	Anna Morandi, Italian anatomist, teacher (1716–1774).	WGPSN
Maranda	4.9°N 169.7°E	16.8	1994	Latvian first name.	WGPSN
Marere	19.6°N 65.8°E	6.3	1997	Polynesian first name.	WGPSN
Maret	33.3°S 79.8°W	11.7	1997	Estonian first name.	WGPSN
Margarita	12.7°N 9.2°E	13	1994	Greek first name.	WGPSN
Margit	60.1°N 86.9°W	14	1985	Hungarian first name.	WGPSN
Maria Celeste	23.4°N 140.4°E	97.5	1991	Maria Celeste, daughter of Galileo (d. 1634).	WGPSN
Marianne	9.3°N 2°W	9	1997	Greek first name, from Mary.	WGPSN
Marie	21.7°S 127.6°W	14.2	1994	French first name. Possibly after Marie Curie.	WGPSN
Mariko	23.3°S 132.9°E	12.9	1997	Japanese first name.	WGPSN
Markham	4.1°S 155.6°E	71.8	1994	Beryl Markham.	WGPSN
Marsh	63.6°S 46.6°E	47.7	1991	Ngaio Marsh.	WGPSN
Martinez	11.7°S 174.7°E	23.5	1994	Maria Martinez.	WGPSN
Marysya	53.3°N 75.1°E	6.3	1997	Belarusian first name.	WGPSN
Marzhan	58.9°S 111.7°W	13.8	1994	Karakal first name.	WGPSN
Masako	30.2°S 53.2°E	23.8	1994	Hozyo Masako.	WGPSN
Masha	60.7°N 88.5°E	6.4	1997	Russian first name.	WGPSN
Matahina	72.3°S 65.9°E	8.5	1997	Polynesian first name.	WGPSN
Maurea	39.5°S 69.1°E	9.9	1997	Polynesian first name.	WGPSN
Mbul'di	23.8°N 74.7°E	6	1997	Fulbe/Wodabi first name.	WGPSN
Mead	12.5°N 57.2°E	270	1991	Margaret Mead.	WGPSN
Medhavi	19.4°S 40.6°E	30.4	1994	Pandita Ramabai Medhavi, East Indian author, humanitarian (1858–1922).	WGPSN
Megan	61.8°S 130.6°E	15.8	1994	Welsh first name.	WGPSN
Meitner	55.6°S 38.4°W	149	1979	Lise Meitner.	WGPSN
Melanie	62.8°S 144.3°E	12.3	1994	Greek first name.	WGPSN
Melanka	34.4°N 19.2°E	9	1997	Ukrainian first name.	WGPSN
Melba	4.7°N 166.5°W	21.8	1994	Nellie Melba.	WGPSN
Melina	69.9°S 40.5°W	12.7	1997	Greek first name.	WGPSN
Meredith	14.5°S 81.1°W	11.4	1997	English first name.	WGPSN
Merian	34.5°N 76.3°E	22.2	1991	Maria Sibylla Merian.	WGPSN
Merit Ptah	11.4°N 115.6°E	16.5	1994	Merit Ptah.	WGPSN
Michelle	19.6°S 40.5°E	15	1994	French first name.	WGPSN
Mildred	51.7°S 11.7°W	12	1997	English first name.	WGPSN
Millay	24.4°N 111.2°E	48	1991	Edna St. Vincent Millay, American poet (1892–1950).	WGPSN
Miovasu	72.1°N 99.9°E	4.5	1997	Cheyenne first name.	WGPSN
Mirabeau	1.1°N 75.7°W	23.8	1994	Sibylle Riqueti de Mirabeau, French writer (d. 1932).	WGPSN
Miriam	36.5°N 48.2°E	16.5	1994	Hebrew first name.	WGPSN
Mona Lisa	25.6°N 25.1°E	79.4	1991	Lisa Giacondo, the model for Leonardo da Vinci's painting Mona Lisa (b. c. 1474).	WGPSN
Monika	72.3°N 122.4°E	25.5	1985	German first name.	WGPSN
Montessori	59.4°N 80°W	42.1	1985	Maria Montessori.	WGPSN
Montez	17.9°N 93.5°W	21.1	1994	Lola Montez.	WGPSN
Moore	30.4°S 111.6°W	21.1	1994	Marianne Moore.	WGPSN
Morisot	61.2°S 148.7°W	48	1994	Berthe Morisot.	WGPSN
Mosaido	17.3°N 75.2°E	7.4	1997	Fulbe/Wodabi first name.	WGPSN
Moses	34.6°N 119.9°E	28	1985	Grandma Moses, American folk artist.	WGPSN
Mowatt	14.6°S 67.7°W	38.4	1994	Anna Cora Mowatt, American actress, playwright, author (1819–1870).	WGPSN
Mu Guiying	41.2°N 81°E	32.3	1991	Mu Guiying, Chinese warrior.	WGPSN
Mukhina	29.5°N 0.5°E	24.5	1985	Vera Mukhina.	WGPSN
Mumtaz-Mahal	30.3°N 131.6°W	38.2	1994	Mumtaz Mahal.	WGPSN
Munter	15.3°S 39.3°E	32.1	1994	Gabriele Münter.	WGPSN
Muriel	41.7°S 12.4°E	20.2	1994	Greek first name.	WGPSN

back to top

== N ==
Crater	Coordinates	Diameter (km)	Approval Year	Eponym	Ref
Nadeyka	54.8°S 54.7°W	9.3	1997	Belarusian first name.	WGPSN
Nadia	27.9°S 0.6°E	11.3	1997	Russian first name.	WGPSN
Nadine	7.8°N 0.9°W	18.6	1994	French first name.	WGPSN
Nadira	44.1°N 158.5°W	31.4	1985	Nodira Uzbek poet (1791–1842).	WGPSN
Nakai	61°S 73.8°W	4.5	1997	Cheyenne first name.	WGPSN
Nalkowska	28.1°N 70°W	22.2	1994	Zofia Nałkowska, Polish novelist, playwright (1884–1954).	WGPSN
Nalkuta	30.1°N 52.2°W	6.5	1997	Ossetian (N. Caucasus) first name.	WGPSN
Namiko	43.4°N 56.2°E	13	1997	Japanese first name.	WGPSN
Nana	49.8°N 75.4°E	8.8	1985	Serbo-Croatian first name.	WGPSN
Nancy	6.4°N 87.8°W	4.4	2010	Hebrew first name.	WGPSN
Nanichi	44.8°S 22.2°W	19	2000	Taíno (Puerto Rico) first name.	WGPSN
Naomi	6°N 70.3°E	17.5	1994	Hebrew first name.	WGPSN
Nastya	49°S 84.2°W	12.5	1997	From Anastasiya, Russian first name.	WGPSN
Natalia	67.1°N 87.1°W	10.8	1985	Romanian first name.	WGPSN
Ndella	15.9°S 60.7°E	5.9	1997	Wolof first name.	WGPSN
Neda	16.7°N 46.5°W	7.7	1997	Macedonian first name.	WGPSN
Nedko	8.8°S 42.4°W	8.5	1997	Nenets (Samoyed) first name.	WGPSN
Neeltje	12.4°N 124.4°E	10	1997	Dutch first name.	WGPSN
Nelike	26.8°S 30.8°W	6.3	1997	Nanay (E. Siberia) first name.	WGPSN
Němcová	5.9°N 125.1°E	22.9	1991	Božena Němcová, Czech novelist, poet (1820–1882).	WGPSN
Nevelson	35.3°S 52.2°W	69.8	1994	Louise Nevelson, American artist (1899–1988).	WGPSN
Ngaio	53.3°S 61.8°E	9.5	1997	Maori first name.	WGPSN
Ngone	6°N 28.1°W	12.2	1997	Wolof (W. Africa, Senegal) first name.	WGPSN
Nicole	48.4°N 100.7°W	6.4	1997	French first name.	WGPSN
Nijinskaya	25.8°N 122.5°E	36.2	1991	Bronislava Nijinskaya, Russian dancer (1891–1972).	WGPSN
Nilanti	38.2°S 28.6°W	9.2	1997	Singalese first name.	WGPSN
Nilsson	75.9°S 82.4°W	27.3	1994	Christina Nilsson, Swedish opera singer, violinist (1843–1921).	WGPSN
Nin	3.9°S 93.6°W	27.1	1994	Anaïs Nin, French novelist (1903–1977).	WGPSN
Nina	55.5°S 121.3°W	24.6	1994	Russian first name.	WGPSN
Ninzi	15.9°N 28.3°W	7.1	1997	Burma (Myanmar) first name.	WGPSN
Nofret	58.8°S 107.8°W	22.5	1994	Nofret, Egyptian queen (c. 1900 BC).	WGPSN
Nomeda	49.2°S 55.5°E	10.4	1997	Lithuanian first name.	WGPSN
Noreen	33.6°N 22.7°E	18.6	1994	Irish first name.	WGPSN
Noriko	5.3°S 1.7°W	7.5	1994	Japanese first name.	WGPSN
Nsele	6.7°N 64.2°E	5.1	1997	Mandingo first name.	WGPSN
Nuon	78.6°N 23.4°W	6.5	1997	Khmer first name.	WGPSN
Nuriet	20.6°N 114.4°W	17.9	2000	Adygan (N. Caucasus) first name.	WGPSN
Nutsa	27.5°N 18.8°W	8	1997	Abkhazian (Georgia) first name.	WGPSN
Nyal'ga	17°N 64.5°E	5.5	1997	Fulbe/Wodabi first name.	WGPSN
Nyele	22.7°S 41.6°W	11.9	1997	Mandingo (W. Africa, Mali) first name.	WGPSN
Nyogari	46.4°S 53.6°W	13	1997	Ewe (W. Africa, Ghana) first name.	WGPSN

back to top

== O ==
Crater	Coordinates	Diameter (km)	Approval Year	Eponym	Ref
O'Connor	26°S 143.9°E	30.4	1991	Flannery O'Connor.	WGPSN
O'Keeffe	24.5°N 131.2°W	76.9	1994	Georgia O'Keeffe, American artist (1887–1986).	WGPSN
Oakley	29.3°S 49.5°W	18.4	1994	Annie Oakley, American sharpshooter, entertainer (1860–1926).	WGPSN
Obukhova	70.7°N 70.3°W	46	1985	Nadezhda Obukhova, Soviet singer (1886–1961).	WGPSN
Odarka	40.8°N 138.2°E	7	1997	Ukrainian first name.	WGPSN
Odikha	41.6°S 121.9°W	10.6	1997	Uzbek first name.	WGPSN
Odilia	81.2°N 159.8°W	20.8	1985	Portuguese first name.	WGPSN
Ogulbek	2.4°N 145°E	6.5	1997	Turkman first name.	WGPSN
Oivit	73.9°S 164.5°W	4.8	1997	Cheyenne first name.	WGPSN
Oksana	11.9°N 8°W	7.7	1997	Ukrainian first name.	WGPSN
Oku	64.2°S 127.8°W	13.3	1997	Karelian first name.	WGPSN
Olena	10.9°N 149°E	7	1997	Ukrainian first name.	WGPSN
Olesnicka	18.3°N 149.1°W	33	1994	Zofia Oleśnicka, Polish poet (fl. c. 1550).	WGPSN
Olesya	5.6°N 86.7°W	12	1997	Ukrainian first name.	WGPSN
Olga	26.1°N 76.2°W	15.5	1994	Russian first name.	WGPSN
Olivia	37.2°N 152.1°W	10.2	1997	Latin first name.	WGPSN
Olya	51.4°N 68.2°W	13.4	1985	Russian first name.	WGPSN
Oma	42.7°S 30.9°W	7.6	2000	Sioux first name.	WGPSN
Onissya	25.6°S 150.2°E	8.2	1997	Komi-Permyak (Urals Finn) first name.	WGPSN
Opika	57.1°S 151.9°E	9.8	1997	Chuvash (Volga area) first name.	WGPSN
Orczy	3.7°N 52.3°E	26.9	1994	Emmuska Orczy, Hungarian novelist, playwright (1865–1947).	WGPSN
Orguk	23.5°S 161.8°W	11.7	1997	Nivkhi (Amur River area, E. Siberia) first name.	WGPSN
Orlette	68.1°S 166.7°W	12.5	1997	French first name.	WGPSN
Orlova	56.5°N 125°W	19.6	1985	Lyubov Orlova, Soviet actress (1902–1975).	WGPSN
Ortensia	7.6°N 155.7°E	7	1997	Italian first name.	WGPSN
Oshalche	29.7°N 155.5°E	8.3	1997	Mari (Volga Finn) first name.	WGPSN
Osipenko	71.2°N 39°W	30	1985	Polina Osipenko, Soviet aviator (1907–1939).	WGPSN
Ottavia	47.5°S 172.9°W	12.9	1997	Roman first name.	WGPSN
Outi	61.6°N 92.3°W	10.5	1997	Finnish first name.	WGPSN

back to top

== P ==
Crater	Coordinates	Diameter (km)	Approval Year	Eponym	Ref
Paige	1.2°S 24.6°E	6.8	1997	Italian first name.	WGPSN
Pamela	11°N 121.5°W	14.2	1994	English first name.	WGPSN
Parishan	0.2°S 146.5°E	6.8	1997	Persian first name.	WGPSN
Parra	20.5°N 78.5°E	42.4	1991	Violeta Parra, Chilean folklore artist (1917 - 1967).	WGPSN
Parvina	62.2°S 153°E	7	1997	Persian (Tajik) first name.	WGPSN
Pasha	42.7°N 156.3°E	7.2	1997	Russian first name from Persian.	WGPSN
Pat	2.9°N 97.4°W	10.1	1997	English first name.	WGPSN
Patimat	1.3°S 156.5°E	5.1	1997	Avarian (Daghestan) first name.	WGPSN
Patti	35°N 58.4°W	47	1985	Adelina Patti, Italian singer (1843–1919).	WGPSN
Pavlinka	25.5°S 158.7°E	7.5	1997	Belarusian first name.	WGPSN
Peck	28.9°S 65.7°W	30.4	1994	Annie Smith Peck, American mountaineer, educator (1850–1935).	WGPSN
Peggy	20.4°S 2.8°W	11.9	1994	English first name (form of Margaret).	WGPSN
Peña	23.6°S 169.4°W	29.6	1994	Tonita Peña (Quah Ah), Pueblo artist (1895–1949).	WGPSN
Phaedra	35.9°N 107.3°W	15.7	1994	Greek first name.	WGPSN
Philomena	40.7°S 151.9°E	14.8	1997	Greek first name.	WGPSN
Phryne	46.2°S 45.3°W	39.4	1994	Phryne, Greek model, courtesan (4th century BC).	WGPSN
Phyllis	12.3°N 132.4°E	11.4	1994	Greek first name.	WGPSN
Piaf	0.8°N 5.3°E	39.1	1991	Edith Piaf, French singer, songwriter (1915–1963).	WGPSN
Piret	37.8°N 41.7°E	27	1991	Estonian first name.	WGPSN
Pirkko	44.8°N 105.4°W	12.3	1997	Finnish first name.	WGPSN
Piscopia	1.5°N 169.1°W	26.2	1994	Elena Cornaro Piscopia, Italian mathematician, educator (1646–1684).	WGPSN
Polenova	45.5°S 24.5°W	41	2000	Elena Polenova, Russian painter, folk crafts trustee (1850–1898).	WGPSN
Polina	42.4°N 148.2°E	21.6	1985	Russian first name.	WGPSN
Ponselle	63°S 70.9°W	57.7	1994	Rosa Ponselle, American opera singer (1897–1981).	WGPSN
Potanina	31.6°N 53.1°E	94.2	1985	Aleksandra Potanina, Russian explorer (1843–1893).	WGPSN
Potter	7.2°N 50.9°W	46.9	1994	Beatrix Potter, English children's author (1866–1943).	WGPSN
Prichard	44°N 11.5°E	23.3	1985	Katharine Susannah Prichard, Australian writer (1884–1969).	WGPSN
Puhioia	20.6°N 69.4°E	5.5	1997	Maori first name.	WGPSN
Purev	31.1°S 46.4°E	11.6	1997	Mongolian first name.	WGPSN
Pychik	62.4°S 33.8°E	10.1	1997	Chukcha (NE Siberia) first name.	WGPSN

back to top

== Q ==
Crater	Coordinates	Diameter (km)	Approval Year	Eponym	Ref
Qarlygha	33°S 162.9°E	9.3	1997	Kazakh first name.	WGPSN
Quimby	5.7°S 76.7°E	23.2	1997	Harriet Quimby, American aviator (1884–1912).	WGPSN
Qulzhan	23.5°N 165.4°E	7.9	1997	Kazakh first name.	WGPSN
Quslu	6.2°N 166.8°E	8.7	1997	Kazakh first name.	WGPSN

back to top

== R ==
Crater	Coordinates	Diameter (km)	Approval Year	Eponym	Ref
Rachel	48.7°S 13.5°E	12.5	1994	Hebrew first name.	WGPSN
Radhika	30.3°S 166.4°E	7.9	1997	Hindu first name.	WGPSN
Radka	75.6°N 96.3°E	10.5	1985	Bulgarian first name.	WGPSN
Radmila	69.1°N 167°E	5.2	1997	Serbo-Croatian first name.	WGPSN
Rae	8.9°S 58.4°E	5.5	1997	From Rachel, Hebrew first name.	WGPSN
Rafiga	62.9°N 175.6°E	5.7	1997	Azeri first name from Arabic.	WGPSN
Raisa	27.5°N 79.7°W	13.5	1994	Russian first name.	WGPSN
Raki	49.4°S 70°E	7.5	1997	Fulbe first name.	WGPSN
Rampyari	50.6°N 179.3°E	7.7	1997	Hindu first name.	WGPSN
Rand	63.8°S 59.5°E	24.3	1994	Ayn Rand, American writer (1905–1982).	WGPSN
Rani	64.1°N 160.4°E	10.7	1985	Hindu first name.	WGPSN
Raymonde	48.4°N 168.5°W	5.3	1997	French first name.	WGPSN
Rebecca	12.1°S 5.4°E	9.5	1997	Hebrew first name.	WGPSN
Recamier	12.6°S 58.1°E	25.3	1991	Julie Récamier, French patriot, defied Napoleon (c. 1777-c. 1849).	WGPSN
Regina	30°N 147.3°E	24.9	1985	Latin first name.	WGPSN
Reiko	22.6°N 167.9°W	9.7	1997	Japanese first name.	WGPSN
Retno	52.9°S 167.7°W	7.2	1997	Indonesian first name.	WGPSN
Rhoda	11.4°N 12.3°W	12.2	1994	Greek first name.	WGPSN
Rhys	8.6°N 61.2°W	44	1994	Jean Rhys, Welsh writer (1894–1979).	WGPSN
Richards	2.5°N 163.9°W	25	1994	Ellen Richards, founder of science of ecology (1842–1911).	WGPSN
Riley	14.1°N 72.5°E	20.2	1991	Margaretta Riley, English botanist (1804–1899).	WGPSN
Rita	71°N 25.2°W	8.3	1985	Italian first name.	WGPSN
Romanskaya	23.2°N 178.4°E	30.4	1994	Sofia Romanskaya, Soviet astronomer (1886–1969).	WGPSN
Romola	9.3°N 54.2°E	17.5	2000	Italian first name.	WGPSN
Roptyna	62.2°N 28.9°E	11.5	1997	Chukcha (NE Siberia) first name.	WGPSN
Rosa Bonheur	9.7°N 71.2°W	104	1994	Rosa Bonheur, French painter (1822–1899).	WGPSN
Rose	35.2°S 111.8°W	15.5	1994	German first name.	WGPSN
Rossetti	57°N 6.4°E	23.4	1985	Christina Rossetti, English poet (1830–1894).	WGPSN
Rowena	10.4°N 171.4°E	19.5	1994	Celtic first name.	WGPSN
Roxanna	26.5°N 25.4°W	9.5	1991	Persian first name.	WGPSN
Royle	32.7°S 166.3°W	6.1	1997	Bashkir first name.	WGPSN
Rudneva	78.4°N 174.7°E	29.8	1985	Varvara Rudneva, Russian physician (1844–1899).	WGPSN
Rufina	74.6°S 164.9°W	5	1997	Greek first name.	WGPSN
Ruit	25.5°S 72.9°E	6.4	1997	Polynesian first name.	WGPSN
Runak	58.5°S 163.7°W	7.6	1997	Kurdian first name.	WGPSN
Ruslanova	83.9°N 16.6°E	44.3	1985	Lidiya Ruslanova, Soviet singer (1900–1973).	WGPSN
Ruth	43.3°N 19.9°E	18.5	1985	Hebrew first name.	WGPSN

back to top

== S ==
Crater	Coordinates	Diameter (km)	Approval Year	Eponym	Ref
Sabin	38.5°S 85.3°W	33.1	1994	Florence R. Sabin.	WGPSN
Sabira	5.8°S 120.1°W	15.7	1994	Tatar first name from Arabic.	WGPSN
Safarmo	10.8°S 161.4°E	7.4	1997	Tajik first name.	WGPSN
Saida	28.2°N 58°W	9.5	1997	Arabic first name.	WGPSN
Salika	5°S 97.7°E	12.5	1994	Mari first name.	WGPSN
Samantha	45.6°N 78.3°W	16.9	1994	Aramaic first name.	WGPSN
Samintang	39°S 80.7°E	25.9	1991	16th century Korean poet.	WGPSN
Sandel	45.7°S 148.3°W	17.9	1994	Cora Sandel, Norwegian author (1880–1974).	WGPSN
Sandi	68.1°S 44.9°W	12.6	1997	From Alexandra, Greek first name.	WGPSN
Sandugach	59.9°N 143.5°E	10	1997	Tartar first name.	WGPSN
Sanger	33.8°N 71.4°W	83.6	1994	Margaret Sanger, American birth control activist (1879–1966).	WGPSN
Sanija	33.1°N 109°W	18	1994	Tatar first name.	WGPSN
Saodat	2.9°S 15.4°W	3.7	2000	Uzbek first name from Arabic.	WGPSN
Sarah	42.4°S 1.8°E	18.5	1994	Hebrew first name.	WGPSN
Sartika	63.4°S 67°E	18.7	1994	Dewi Sartika, Indonesian educator (1884–1942).	WGPSN
Sasha	38.3°N 82.7°W	4.6	1997	Russian first name.	WGPSN
Saskia	28.6°S 22.9°W	37.1	1991	Saskia van Uylenburgh, Rembrandt's wife.	WGPSN
Sayers	67.5°S 130.2°W	98	1994	Dorothy L. Sayers, English novelist, playwright.(1893–1957).	WGPSN
Sayligul	73.6°N 172.9°E	4.3	1997	Persian (Tajik) first name.	WGPSN
Scarpellini	23.2°S 34.6°E	27.1	1991	Caterina Scarpellini, 19th century Italian astronomer.	WGPSN
Seiko	21°S 143.4°W	3.4	2003	Japanese first name.	WGPSN
Selma	68.5°N 155.9°E	11.4	1985	Celtic first name.	WGPSN
Seseg	36.3°S 47.4°W	9.8	1997	Buryat (Siberia) first name.	WGPSN
Sévigné	52.6°N 33.5°W	29.6	1985	Marie Sévigné, French writer (1626–1696).	WGPSN
Seymour	18.2°N 33.5°W	63	1994	Jane Seymour, English queen (c. 1509–1537).	WGPSN
Shakira	3°N 146.4°W	17.6	1994	Bashkir first name.	WGPSN
Shasenem	44°S 101.1°W	9	1997	Turkman first name from Persian and Arabic.	WGPSN
Sheila	19.9°N 50.2°E	5.6	1997	Irish/Celtic first name.	WGPSN
Shih Mai-Yu	18.4°N 41.1°W	22.3	1994	Chinese physician (1873–1954).	WGPSN
Shirley	31.5°N 55.4°E	18	2000	English first name.	WGPSN
Shushan	43.8°S 70.2°E	8.5	1997	Armenian first name.	WGPSN
Sidney	13.4°N 160.4°W	20.2	1994	Mary Sidney, Elizabethan dramatist (1561–1621).	WGPSN
Sigrid	63.6°N 45.6°W	16.2	1985	Scandinavian first name.	WGPSN
Simbya	74.4°S 130°E	4	1997	Nganasan (Samoyed) first name.	WGPSN
Simonenko	26.9°S 97.6°E	31.9	1991	Alla Nikolaevna Simonenko, Soviet astronomer.	WGPSN
Sirani	31.5°S 129.6°W	28.3	1994	Elisabetta Sirani, Italian painter, etcher, printmaker (1638–1665).	WGPSN
Sitwell	16.6°N 169.6°W	32.8	1994	Edith Sitwell, English poet, critic (1887–1964).	WGPSN
Solace	35.9°N 42.8°W	5.3	2000	Latin first name.	WGPSN
Sophia	28.6°S 18.8°E	17.6	1994	Greek first name.	WGPSN
Sovadi	44.8°S 134.5°W	12.4	2000	Khmer (Cambodian) first name.	WGPSN
Stanton	23.3°S 160.7°W	107	1994	Elizabeth C. Stanton, American suffragist (1815–1902).	WGPSN
Stefania	51.3°N 26.7°W	11.7	1985	Romanian first name.	WGPSN
Stein	30.1°S 14.5°W	13.3	1991	Gertrude Stein, American writer (1874–1946).	WGPSN
Steinbach	41.4°S 103.1°W	20.3	1994	Sabina von Steinbach, German sculptor (c. 1250).	WGPSN
Stina	37.4°N 22.8°E	10.4	1985	Swedish first name.	WGPSN
Storni	9.8°S 114.4°W	21.7	1994	Alfonsina Storni, Argentine poet (1892–1938).	WGPSN
Stowe	43.2°S 126.8°W	80	1994	Harriet Beecher Stowe, American novelist (1811–1896).	WGPSN
Stuart	30.8°S 20.2°E	68.6	1991	Mary Stuart, Queen of Scots (1542–1587).	WGPSN
Suliko	9.6°N 145.4°W	14.9	1994	Georgian first name.	WGPSN
Sullivan	1.4°S 110.9°E	32	1994	Anne Sullivan, American teacher of Helen Keller (1866–1936).	WGPSN
Surija	5.3°N 178.2°E	15.3	1994	Azeri first name.	WGPSN
Susanna	6°N 93.3°E	13.3	1994	Hebrew first name.	WGPSN
Sveta	82.5°N 86.8°W	21	1991	Russian first name	WGPSN

back to top

== T ==
Crater	Coordinates	Diameter (km)	Approval Year	Eponym	Ref
Taglioni	41.7°N 122.6°E	31	1985	Marie Taglioni	WGPSN
Tahia	44.3°N 73.7°E	6.1	1997	Polynesian first name.	WGPSN
Taira	1.6°S 63.2°W	19.6	1994	Osset first name.	WGPSN
Tako	25.1°N 74.7°W	10.7	1997	Fulbe first name.	WGPSN
Talvikki	41.9°N 22°E	12.6	1997	Finnish first name.	WGPSN
Tamara	61.6°N 42.8°W	11	1985	Georgian first name.	WGPSN
Tanya	19.3°S 77.3°W	14	1994	Russian first name.	WGPSN
Tatyana	85.4°N 147.6°W	19	1985	Russian first name.	WGPSN
Taussig	9.2°S 131°W	25.8	1994	Helen Taussig, American pediatrician, heart researcher (1898–1986).	WGPSN
Tehina	30.4°S 76.4°E	5.4	1997	Polynesian first name.	WGPSN
Tekarohi	21.2°N 76.4°E	9.3	1997	Polynesian first name.	WGPSN
Temou	10°S 83.4°E	9.3	1997	Polynesian first name.	WGPSN
Teresa	42.5°S 10°E	14.8	1994	First name from Greek.	WGPSN
Terhi	45.7°N 106.9°W	10.7	1997	Finnish first name.	WGPSN
Teroro	75.8°S 88.1°E	9.2	1997	Polynesian first name.	WGPSN
Teumere	38.3°S 88.1°E	5.4	1997	Polynesian first name.	WGPSN
Teura	12.3°S 90.2°E	9.3	1997	Polynesian first name.	WGPSN
Thomas	13°S 87.5°W	25.2	1994	Martha Thomas, American college president (1857–1935).	WGPSN
Tiffany	8.7°S 22.9°E	7	1997	Greek first name.	WGPSN
Tinyl	9.7°N 132.1°E	12.8	1997	Chukcha (NE Siberia) first name.	WGPSN
Toklas	0.7°N 86.9°W	17.5	1994	Alice B. Toklas, American writer, art patron (1877–1967).	WGPSN
Tolgonay	68.8°N 88.9°W	4.6	1997	Kyrgyz first name.	WGPSN
Trollope	54.8°S 113.6°W	27.2	1994	Frances Trollope, English novelist (1780–1863).	WGPSN
Truth	28.7°N 72.2°W	47.3	1994	Sojourner Truth, American abolitionist (1797–1883).	WGPSN
Tseraskaya	28.6°N 79.2°E	30.3	1985	Lidiya Tseraskaya, Soviet astronomer (1855–1931).	WGPSN
Tsetsa	31.3°N 42.3°W	9.9	1997	Mordovian (Volga Finn) first name.	WGPSN
Tsiala	2.9°N 100°E	16.5	1994	Georgian first name.	WGPSN
Tsvetayeva	64.6°N 147.4°E	42.9	1985	Marina Tsvetayeva, Soviet poet (1892–1941).	WGPSN
Tsyrma	14.1°S 41.5°W	7.8	1997	Buryat (Siberia) first name.	WGPSN
Tubman	23.6°N 155.4°W	42.9	1994	Harriet Tubman, American abolishionist (1820–1913).	WGPSN
Tünde	76.8°N 167°W	16.3	1985	Hungarian first name.	WGPSN
Tursunoy	80.9°N 130.7°W	4.7	1997	Uzbek first name.	WGPSN
Tussaud	21.7°N 139°W	16	1994	Marie Tussaud, Swiss wax artist (1760–1850).	WGPSN
Tuyara	62.9°S 15.5°E	13.2	1997	Yakut first name	WGPSN

back to top

== U ==
Crater	Coordinates	Diameter (km)	Approval Year	Eponym	Ref
Ualinka	13.2°N 168.6°E	8.1	1997	Ossetian (N. Caucasus) first name	WGPSN
Udagan	10.7°N 153.1°W	11.5	1997	Yakut first name.	WGPSN
Udaltsova	20.3°S 84.7°W	26.7	1994	Nadezhda Udaltsova, Russian artist (1885–1961).	WGPSN
Udyaka	30.9°N 172.9°E	7.7	1997	Orochi (Amur River) first name.	WGPSN
Ugne	34.9°N 154.2°W	10.3	1997	Lithuanian first name.	WGPSN
Ulʼyana	24.3°N 107°W	12.5	1997	Russian first name.	WGPSN
Uleken	33.7°N 174.9°W	10.9	1997	Nanay (Amur River area, E. Siberia) first name.	WGPSN
Ulla	51.5°S 175.5°W	10.4	1997	Swedish first name.	WGPSN
Ulpu	35.7°S 179°E	7	1997	Finnish first name.	WGPSN
Ulrique	75.9°N 55.6°E	19.6	1985	French first name.	WGPSN
Uluk	62.2°S 178.6°E	10.3	1997	Neghidalian (Amur River area, E. Siberia) first name.	WGPSN
Umaima	23.3°S 164.6°W	6.9	1997	Arabic first name.	WGPSN
Umkana	53.3°S 161.4°W	6.2	1997	Eskimo (Chukotka) first name.	WGPSN
Unay	53.5°N 172.7°E	11.4	1997	Mari first name.	WGPSN
Undset	51.7°N 60.8°E	20	1985	Sigrid Undset, Norwegian author (1882–1949).	WGPSN
Unitkak	40.8°N 160.5°W	8	1997	Eskimo (Chukotka) first name.	WGPSN
Urazbike	9°S 157.5°W	7	1997	Tartar first name.	WGPSN
Ustinya	41.2°S 108.4°W	11.8	1997	Russian first name.	WGPSN
Uvaysi	2.3°N 161.7°W	38.9	1994	Jahonotin Uvaysiy, Uzbek poet (c. 1780-c. 1850).	WGPSN
Uyengimi	76.9°S 155.1°W	8.9	1997	Khanty, Mansi (Ob River Finn) first name.	WGPSN

back to top

== V ==
Crater	Coordinates	Diameter (km)	Approval Year	Eponym	Ref
Văcărescu	63°S 160.2°W	31.5	1994	Elena Văcărescu.	WGPSN
Vaka	41.4°S 8.9°E	11.8	1997	Bulgarian first name.	WGPSN
Valadon	49°S 167.7°E	25.2	1994	Suzanne Valadon, French painter (1865–1940).	WGPSN
Valborg	75.5°N 87.9°W	20	1985	Danish first name.	WGPSN
Valentina	46.4°N 144.1°E	24.6	1985	Latin first name.	WGPSN
Valerie	6.4°S 30.9°E	13.6	1997	French first name.	WGPSN
Vallija	26.3°N 120°E	15.2	1994	Latvian first name.	WGPSN
Vanessa	6°S 1.9°E	10	1997	Greek first name.	WGPSN
Vard	17.5°N 45.5°W	6.1	1997	Armenian first name.	WGPSN
Varya	2.8°N 148.2°W	14.3	1997	Russian first name.	WGPSN
Vashti	6.8°S 43.7°E	17	1994	Persian first name.	WGPSN
Vasilutsa	16.5°N 25.6°W	5.7	1997	Moldavian first name.	WGPSN
Vassi	34.4°N 13.5°W	8.5	1997	Karelian first name.	WGPSN
Veriko	20.4°N 9.9°W	5.2	1997	Georgian first name.	WGPSN
Veronica	38.1°S 124.6°E	17.9	1994	Latin first name.	WGPSN
Vesna	60.3°S 139.5°W	14.9	1994	Slavic first name.	WGPSN
Veta	42.6°N 10.5°W	6.4	1997	Romanian first name.	WGPSN
Vigée-Lebrun	17.3°N 141.4°E	57.8	1991	Élisabeth-Louise Vigée-Le Brun, French painter (1755–1842). Spelling changed from Vigier Lebrun.	WGPSN
Viola	36.1°S 119.5°W	10	1997	English first name.	WGPSN
Virga	26.9°S 7.7°E	10.3	1997	Lithuanian first name.	WGPSN
Virginia	52.9°S 174.1°W	18.5	1994	Latin first name.	WGPSN
Virve	5.1°S 13.1°W	18	1994	Estonian first name.	WGPSN
Vlasta	28.4°N 109.9°W	10.7	1997	Czech first name.	WGPSN
Volkova	75.2°N 117.8°W	47.5	1985	Anna Volkova, Russian chemist (1800–1876).	WGPSN
Volyana	60.6°N 0.1°W	5.3	1997	Romani first name.	WGPSN
von Paradis	32.2°S 45.1°W	37.5	1994	Maria von Paradis, Austrian pianist (1759–1834).	WGPSN
von Schuurman	5°S 169°W	29.1	1994	Anna Maria van Schurman, Dutch linguist, writer, artist (1607–1678).	WGPSN
Von Siebold	52°S 36.6°E	32.4	1991	Regina von Siebold, German physician, educator (1771–1849).	WGPSN
von Suttner	10.6°S 125.1°W	24	1994	Bertha von Suttner, Austrian journalist, pacifist (1843–1914).	WGPSN
Voynich	35.4°N 56.1°E	48.7	1985	Ethel Lilian Voynich	WGPSN

back to top

== W ==
Crater	Coordinates	Diameter (km)	Approval Year	Eponym	Ref
Wanda	71.3°N 36.9°W	21.7	1985	Polish first name.	WGPSN
Wang Zhenyi	13.2°N 142.2°W	23.4	1994	Wang Zhenyi, Chinese astronomer, geophysicist (1768–1797).	WGPSN
Warren	11.7°S 176.5°E	50.9	1994	Mercy Warren, American colonial poet, playwright, historian (1728–1814).	WGPSN
Wazata	33.6°N 61.7°W	13.9	1997	Hausa (Nigeria) first name.	WGPSN
Weil	19.4°N 76.9°W	24.2	1994	Simone Weil, French author (1909–1943).	WGPSN
Wen Shu	5°S 56.3°W	31.5	1994	Wen Shu, Chinese painter (1595–1634).	WGPSN
Wendla	22.5°N 152.4°W	5.7	1997	Swedish first name.	WGPSN
West	26.1°N 57°W	28.8	1994	Rebecca West, Irish novelist, critic, actress (1892–1983).	WGPSN
Wharton	55.7°N 61.9°E	50.5	1985	Edith Wharton, American writer (1862–1937).	WGPSN
Wheatley	16.6°N 92°W	74.8	1994	Phillis Wheatley, first black writer of note in America (1753–1784).	WGPSN
Whiting	6.1°S 128°E	35.7	1994	Sarah Frances Whiting , American physicist, astronomer (1847–1927).	WGPSN
Whitney	30.2°S 151.3°E	42.5	1994	Mary Whitney, American astronomer (1847–1921).	WGPSN
Wieck	74.2°S 115.2°W	20.2	1994	Clara Wieck, German pianist, composer (1819–1896).	WGPSN
Wilder	17.4°N 122.6°E	35.1	1991	Laura Ingalls Wilder, American author (1867–1957).	WGPSN
Willard	24.6°S 63.9°W	48.4	1994	Emma Willard, American educator (1787–1870).	WGPSN
Wilma	36.7°N 1.7°E	12.5	1997	English first name.	WGPSN
Winema	3°N 168.6°E	21.7	1994	Winema, Modoc Indian heroine, peacemaker (c. 1848–1932).	WGPSN
Winnemucca	15.4°S 121.1°E	30.3	1994	Sarah Winnemucca, Piute interpreter, activist (c. 1844–1891).	WGPSN
Wiwi-yokpa	73.8°S 131.6°W	4.5	1997	Abenaki/Algonquin (Canada) first name.	WGPSN
Wollstonecraft	39.1°S 99.2°W	44.1	1994	Mary Wollstonecraft, English author (1759–1797).	WGPSN
Woolf	37.7°S 27.2°E	24.5	1991	Virginia Woolf, British writer (1882–1941).	WGPSN
Workman	12.9°S 60.1°W	17.4	1994	Fanny Workman, American mountaineer, author (1859–1925).	WGPSN
Wu Hou	25.5°S 42.6°W	27.5	1994	Wu Hou, Chinese empress (c. 624–705).	WGPSN
Wynne	55°N 53.6°E	10	1997	English first name	WGPSN

back to top

== X ==
Crater	Coordinates	Diameter (km)	Approval Year	Eponym	Ref
Xantippe	10.9°S 11.8°E	40.4	1991	Xanthippe, the wife of Socrates.	WGPSN
Xenia	30.3°S 110.6°W	13.5	1997	Greek first name	WGPSN
Xi Wang	14°N 152°W	7.7	1997	Chinese first name	WGPSN
Xiao Hong	43.5°S 101.7°E	38.7	1991	Xiao Hong, Chinese novelist (1911–1942)	WGPSN
Ximena	68.2°S 116.4°W	12.8	1997	Portuguese first name	WGPSN

back to top

== Y ==
Crater	Coordinates	Diameter (km)	Approval Year	Eponym	Ref
Yablochkina	48.3°N 164.7°W	64.3	1985	Aleksandra Yablochkina, Soviet actress (1866–1964)	WGPSN
Yakyt	2.1°N 170.2°E	13.8	1997	Karakalpak first name.	WGPSN
Yale	13.4°S 88.8°W	18.5	1994	Caroline Yale, American educator of the deaf (1848–1933).	WGPSN
Yambika	32.6°N 151.3°W	6.5	1997	Mari (Volga Finn) first name.	WGPSN
Yasuko	26.1°S 169°E	10.6	1997	Japanese first name.	WGPSN
Yazruk	21.2°N 160.2°E	10.5	1997	Nivkhi (Amur River area, E. Siberia) first name.	WGPSN
Yelya	47.5°S 148.3°W	8.6	1997	Nenets (Samoyed) first name.	WGPSN
Yemysh	11.9°N 145.3°W	6	1997	Mari (Volga Finn) first name.	WGPSN
Yenlik	16°S 134.6°W	8.6	1997	Kazakh first name.	WGPSN
Yerguk	42.7°N 133.2°W	6.3	1997	Neghidalian (Amur River) first name.	WGPSN
Yeska	27.4°N 129.9°W	9.1	1997	Selkup (Samoyed) first name.	WGPSN
Yetta	58.6°N 174.6°W	9	1997	From Henrietta, German first name.	WGPSN
Yokhtik	50.1°S 158.1°E	11.4	1997	Nivkhi (Amur River area, E. Siberia) first name.	WGPSN
Yoko	5.7°S 128°W	5	1997	Japanese first name.	WGPSN
Yolanda	7.8°N 152.7°E	11.4	1997	Greek first name.	WGPSN
Yomile	27.3°S 138.7°E	13.6	1997	Bashkir first name.	WGPSN
Yonge	14°S 115.1°E	42.8	1994	Charlotte Mary Yonge, English writer (1823–1901).	WGPSN
Yonok	65.1°S 125.9°W	9.5	1997	Korean first name.	WGPSN
Yonsuk	34°S 125.2°W	8.5	1997	Korean first name.	WGPSN
Yoshioka	32.4°S 59°E	16.6	1994	Yayoi, Japanese physician, college founder (c. 1871–1959).	WGPSN
Ytunde	49.9°N 81.1°E	6.1	1997	Yoruba first name.	WGPSN
Yvette	7.5°N 110.4°W	10.6	1997	French first name	WGPSN
Yvonne	56°S 61.6°W	14.5	1994	French first name	WGPSN

back to top

== Z ==
Crater	Coordinates	Diameter (km)	Approval Year	Eponym	Ref
Zakiya	66.5°S 125.9°W	7.5	1997	Arabic first name	WGPSN
Zamudio	9.6°N 170.7°W	19	1994	Adela Zamudio, Bolivian poet (1854–1928).	WGPSN
Zarema	16.8°N 124.8°W	5	1997	Avarian (Daghestan) first name.	WGPSN
Zdravka	65.1°N 61°W	12.5	1985	Bulgarian first name.	WGPSN
Zeinab	2.2°S 159.6°E	12.5	1997	Persian first name from Arabic	WGPSN
Zemfira	46.2°S 157.7°E	11.4	1997	Romani first name.	WGPSN
Zenobia	29.3°S 28.6°E	39.1	1994	Zenobia, Queen of Palmyra (Syria) (3rd century AD).	WGPSN
Zerine	29.6°S 101.4°W	6.5	1997	Persian first name.	WGPSN
Zhilova	66.3°N 125.7°E	53	1985	Maria Zhilova, Russian astronomer (1870–1934).	WGPSN
Zhu Shuzhen	26.5°S 3.5°W	29.4	1991	Zhu Shuzhen, Chinese poet (1126–1200).	WGPSN
Zija	3.5°S 95°W	16.8	1994	Arabic first name.	WGPSN
Zina	41.9°N 39.9°W	9	1985	Romanian first name.	WGPSN
Živile	48.8°N 113.1°E	13.5	1997	Lithuanian first name.	WGPSN
Zlata	64.6°N 26.1°W	7	1985	Serbo-Croatian first name.	WGPSN
Zosia	18.9°S 109.2°E	10.5	1997	Polish first name.	WGPSN
Zoya	69.1°N 123.8°W	20	1985	Russian first name.	WGPSN
Zuhrah	34.7°N 3°W	5.8	1997	Arabic first name.	WGPSN
Zula	7.3°N 78°W	5	1997	Chechen first name.	WGPSN
Zulfiya	18.4°N 101.9°E	12.9	1997	Uzbek first name.	WGPSN
Zulma	7.7°S 102°E	11	1997	Spanish first name.	WGPSN
Zumrad	32.1°N 94.8°E	12.9	1997	Uzbek first name.	WGPSN
Zurka	12.8°S 84.8°W	5.5	1997	Romani first name.	WGPSN
Zvereva	45.4°N 76.9°W	22.9	1985	Lydia Zvereva, Russian aviator (1890–1916), also see 3322 Lidiya	WGPSN

back to top

== Dropped and not approved names ==
Crater	Coordinates	Diameter (km)	Approval Year	Eponym	Ref
Josefina	–	26	1994	Portuguese first name	WGPSN
Lida	–	12.50	1994	First name from Greek. Name changed to Amanda.	WGPSN
Lorelei	–	243.9	1997	Dropped. German first name.	WGPSN
Simone	–	14	1994	French first name	WGPSN

back to top

== See also ==
- List of montes on Venus
- List of coronae on Venus
- List of geological features on Venus
