= Edgeworth =

Edgeworth may refer to:

== People ==
- Edgeworth (surname)

== Places ==
- Edgeworth, Gloucestershire, England
- Edgeworth, New South Wales, Australia
- Edgeworth, Pennsylvania, USA
- Edgworth, a village in Lancashire, England
- Edgeworth Island, Nunavut, Canada
- Edgeworthstown, County Longford, Ireland

== Other uses ==
- Edgeworth conjecture on the relation of the core and the Walrasian equilibria
- Edgeworth series of higher-order asymptotic expansions for probability densities.
- Edgeworth (crater), a crater on Venus
