= Xanthippe (disambiguation) =

Xanthippe or Xantippe (from Greek Ξανθίππη) was the wife of Socrates.

Xanthippe or Xantippe may also refer to:

- Xanthippe (mythology), three figures in Greek mythology
- Acts of Xanthippe, Polyxena, and Rebecca, New Testament apocrypha that dates from the third or fourth century
- 156 Xanthippe, an asteroid
- Xanthippe (mite), a genus of mites in the family Ascidae
- Xantippe (moth), a genus of moths in the family Pyralidae
- Xanthippe's shrew a mammal in the family Soricidae found in Kenya and Tanzania.
- Arta epicoenalis (synonyms Xantippe beatifica and Xantippe descansalis), a species of snout moth
- Heliades mulleolella (synonym Xantippe uranides) a species of moth of the family Pyralidae.
- Xantippe, Western Australia a village in Western Australia
- Xantippe Saunders, an American portrait painter and art teacher
- Xanthippe Voorhees, a character on the Netflix series Unbreakable Kimmy Schmidt
- Xantippe (crater), crater on Venus
