= Mariko =

Mariko may refer to:

== Places ==
- Mariko-juku (鞠子宿), a post station along the Tōkaidō
- Mariko, Mali
- Mariko (crater), an impact crater on Venus

== People ==
- MC Mariko (Mari Pajalahti, born 1979), Finnish music group Kwan
- Bourama Mariko (born 1979), a Malian judoka
- Oumar Mariko (born 1959), a Malian doctor and politician
- Mariko (given name)
