= Nanichi =

Crater on Venus named by Pedro Guanikeyu Torres

- Location: Venus
- Coordinates: 44.8°S 22.2°W
- Diameter: 19 km
- Eponym: Taino first name

Nanichi is a crater found the Magellian region on the planet Venus. It measures 19 km in diameter, and is located at +East, 0 - 360 using the planetocentric coordinate system.

Its name is derived from the original Taino language of the Greater Antilles and means "My Love or My Heart". The name, given in 2000 by the International Astronomical Union (IAU) was provided by the Taino leader, Chief Pedro Guanikeyu Torres of the Jatibonicu Taino of Puerto Rico.

== See also ==
- Geology of Venus
- List of craters on Venus
- Magellan probe
