= Caterina Scarpellini =

Italian astronomer

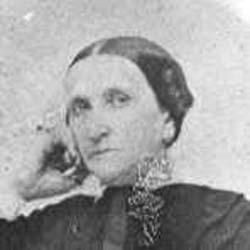
- Born: 29 October 1808; Foligno
- Died: 28 November 1873 (aged 65); Foligno
- Occupations: astronomer and meteorologist
- Known for: Discovering a comet

Caterina Scarpellini (29 October 1808 – 28 November 1873) was an Italian astronomer and meteorologist who discovered a comet and as a meteorologist she established a station in Rome in the 1850s. She published more than fifty notes and reports over twenty years, and was rewarded with a silver medal by the Italian government.

== Life ==
Scarpellini was born in Foligno in Perugia on 29 October 1808. Her family were prominent in the town, and her uncle and godfather was Abbé Feliciano Scarpellini (1762–1840), an astronomer. Feliciano had been appointed by Pope Pius VI as Chair of Sacred Physics at the Roman College of Campidoglio in 1816. He was also the director of the Roman Campidoglio Observatory. Scarpellini moved to Rome at the age of 18, and worked as an assistant to her uncle. She was a corresponding member of the Accademia dei Georgofili in Florence.

Scarpellini was not allowed to become a member of the Accademia dei Lincei, which her uncle had helped re-establish in 1801. She was excluded because she was a woman and also due to her political and philosophical view points. From 1847 Scarpellini edited the scientific bulletin Correspondenza Scientific in Roma. Between 1853 and 1873 she published more than fifty notes and reports based on her regular observations but also on electrical, magnetic and geological subjects.

Scarpellini discovered a comet on 1 April 1854. Along with her husband, Erasmo Fabri, she established a meteorological station in Rome in 1856. In 1872 she was honoured by the Italian government for her work with a silver medal; she died 28 November the following year following a stroke, aged 65.

== Legacy ==
A statue of Scarpellini was erected in the Campo Verano in Rome in 1874. One of the craters of Venus is named after her.
