= Aleksandra Potanina =

Russian explorer (1843–1893)

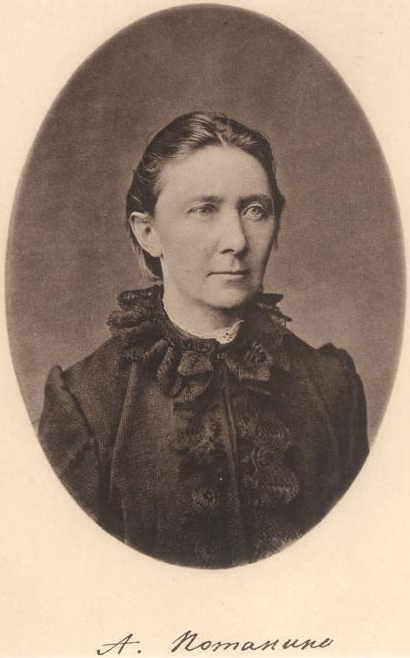
Aleksandra Potanina

Aleksandra Potanina (1843–1893), was a Russian explorer. She was married to Grigory Potanin.

One of the craters of Venus is named after her.

== Sources ==
- "Потанина, Александра Викторовна" . Brockhaus and Efron Encyclopedic Dictionary (in Russian). 1906.
- В. и Е. Зарины. Путешествия А. В. Потаниной. — Государственное издательство географической литературы, 1950. — 100 с. — 50 000 экз.
