= Mona Lisa (crater) =

Crater on Venus

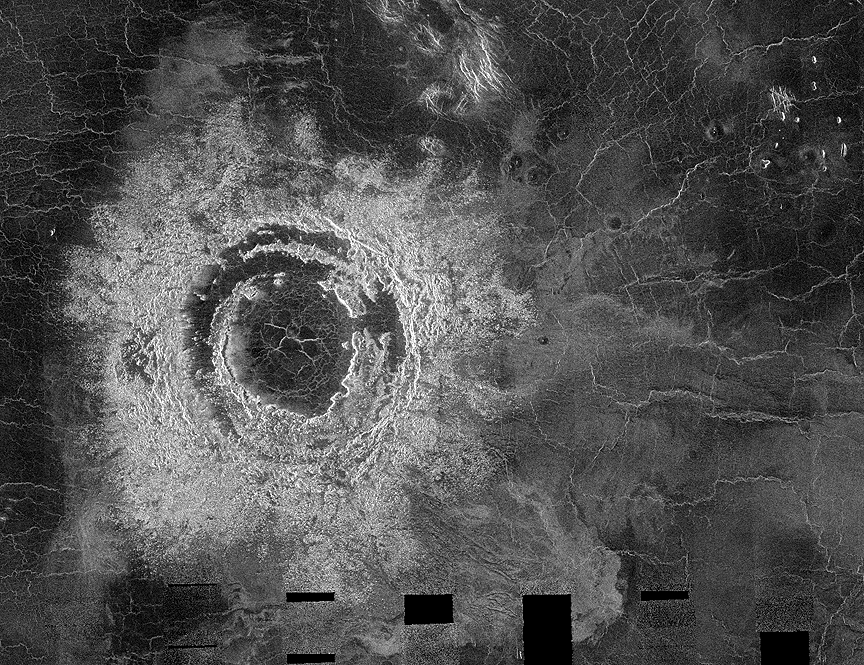
- Magellan radar image of Mona Lisa
- Location: Venus
- Coordinates: 25.6°N 25.1°E
- Diameter: 79.4 km (49.3 mi)
- Eponym: Lisa Giacondo

Mona Lisa is a crater on Venus at latitude 25.55, longitude 25.1. It was named in 1991 after Lisa Giacondo, Leonardo da Vinci's model for the painting Mona Lisa.

Mona Lisa is a peak ring crater. It lies within Bereghinya Planitia and is northeast of Asomama Corona.
