= Dorothy (Venusian crater) =

Crater in Venus

- Location: Venus
- Coordinates: 35.4°S 11.3°E
- Diameter: 8.4 km
- Eponym: Greek first name

Dorothy Crater is an impact crater on the surface of Venus.

The names for small craters on Venus (with a diameter less than 20 km) are chosen from common female names. Dorothy is an English form of a Greek first name, and the crater was officially designated by the IAU in 1997. The crater is east of Tamfana Corona, and south of Seoritsu Farra. It has a continuous ejecta radius of 12.5 km.

Like many impact craters on Venus, Dorothy has been flooded and buried by lava flows in the exterior of the crater.

== See also ==
- List of craters on Venus
