= Marie Fouquet =

Marie François Fouquet (French: [maʁi fukɛ]; 1590–1681), was a French medical writer and philanthropist.

She was born to Gilles de Maupeou, and married François IV Fouquet in 1610.

She was the manager of the hospital Dame de la Charité de l'Hôtel-Dieu in Paris (1634), director of the hospital l'Hôpital des Filles de la Providence in Paris (1658), and manager of the hospital des Dames de la Propagation de La Foi (1664).

In 1674 she published a medical recipe book, Recueil de receptes ou est expliquee la maniere de guerir a peu de frais toute sorte de maux.

In 1682 she published Recueil des remedes faciles et domestiques.

In 1685 she published Les remèdes charitables de Madame Fouquet, pour guérir à peu de frais toute forme de maux tant internes qu'externes, invéterez, et qui ont passé jusques à présent pour incurables, experimentez par la même dame : et augmentez de la méthode que l'on pratique à l'Hôtel des Invalides pour guérir les soldats de la vérole. This was a medical work which described medical experiments and treatments she herself had developed to cure various illnesses, among them syphilis.

She had 15 children, including Nicolas Fouquet, the Superintendent of Finances under Louis XIV, and Louis Fouquet, Bishop of Agde.

One of the craters of Venus is named after her.
