= Gregory (Venusian crater) =

Crater on Venus

- Location: Venus
- Coordinates: 7.1°N 95.8°E
- Diameter: 18 km
- Eponym: Isabella Augusta Gregory

Gregory is a crater on Venus named after Irish playwright Isabella Augusta Gregory by the IAU in 1994.

It lies in northern Ovada Regio.
