= Baranamtarra (crater) =

Crater on Venus

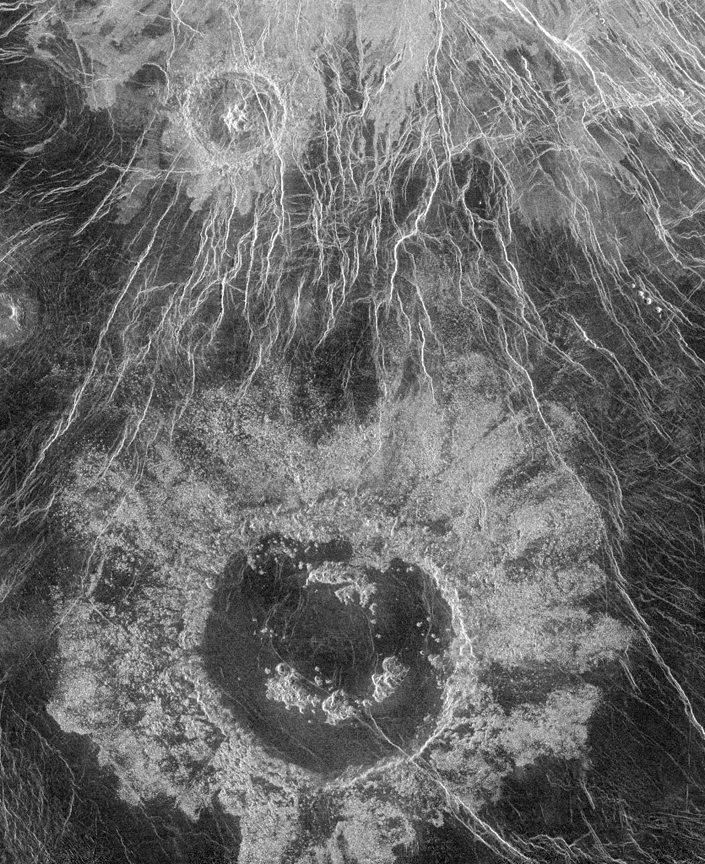
- Magellan radar image. Baranamtarra is visible on the north of the image.
- Location: Venus
- Coordinates: 16.6°N 268.0°E
- Diameter: 25.5 km (15.8 mi)
- Eponym: Mesopotamian queen (c. 2500 B.C.).

Baranamtarra is a 25.5 km diameter crater on the surface of Venus. The crater is proximate to the Zverine Chasma, along with Montez, Wheatley, and Kono Mons.

== Geology and characteristics ==
Baranamtarra has a diameter of 25.5 km, with a continuous ejecta radius of 14 km and a wall width of 2.2 km. The crater is highly embayed by the volcanic flows and is fractured, which is extremely rare for a crater since only 12% of craters are fractured, and approximately 2.5% of craters that are embayed by lava. The crater can be located at the coordinates 16.6°N 268.0°E.

== Naming ==
Baranamtarra's name derives from the Mesopotamian queen named Baranamtarra, which was approved by the IAU in the year 1994. On Venus, they are named after deceased women who have made outstanding or fundamental contributions to their field if the crater is over 20 km in diameter.
