= Jerusha Jhirad =

Indian physician (1891–1984)

Jerusha Jhirad MD, FRCOG, MBE
- Born: 21 March 1891; Mumbai, Bombay Presidency, India
- Died: 2 June 1984 (aged 93); India
- Occupation: Physician
- Awards: Padma Shri

Jerusha Jacob Jhirad FRCOG, MBE (21 March 1891 – 2 June 1984) was an Indian physician.

== Early life and education ==
Jhirad was born in Shivamogga, Karnataka. She was a member of the Bene Israel Jewish community. She attended high school in Pune, then Grant Medical College in Bombay, where she became a Licentiate in Medicine and Surgery with an L.M.S. diploma in 1912. She was the first woman to be granted a scholarship by the Indian government to study abroad. In England she studied at the London School of Medicine for Women (based at the Royal Free Hospital), re-qualified as a Bachelor of Medicine and Bachelor of Surgery (MB BS) of the University of London in 1917 and went on to a doctorate (M.D.) in 1919 in Midwifery and Diseases of Women. Specializing in obstetrics and gynaecology she worked as a House Surgeon at the Elizabeth Garrett Anderson Hospital in London in 1917 and at the Birmingham Maternity Hospital in 1918 before returning to India.

== Career ==
While she was studying in England during World War I, Jhirad was an obstetric assistant and house surgeon at the Elizabeth Garrett Anderson Hospital in London, and house surgeon at a maternity hospital in Birmingham. Back in India by 1920, she was briefly an obstetrician at the Lady Hardinge Hospital in Delhi. From 1920 to 1924, she was medical officer-in-charge at the maternity hospital in Bangalore. From 1925 to 1928 she was on the staff of the Cama Hospital in Mumbai, where she served as medical officer-in-charge in 1929 to 1947.

Jhirad was appointed a justice of the peace in 1931. In 1934 she provided medical assistance to survivors of an earthquake in Bihar. In 1937 and 1938 she made a statistical study of maternal mortality in Bombay. She was a founding member and president of the Bombay Obstetric and Gynaecological Society, and president of the Federation of Obstetric and Gynaecological Societies of India (FOGSI). and from 1947 to 1957 president of the Association of Medical Women in India (AMWI). She wrote in favor of sex education and healthy recreational options to limit unplanned pregnancies. In 1950 she presided at the 6th All India Obstetric and Gynaecological Congress, held in Madras.

Jhirad was also a pioneer of Progressive Judaism; after attending mixed-gender prayers at the Jewish Religious Union (JRU), she returned to Mumbai and founded a JRU-affiliated congregation among the Bene Israel with her sister Leah in 1925.

== Selected publications ==
- "Medico-social work" (1929)
- "Maternal Mortality" (1936)
- "Report on an investigation into the causes of maternal mortality in the city of Bombay." (1941)
- "Uterine Inversion" (1946)
- "Women in the Medical Profession" (1960)
- "Practical aspects of birth control" (1963)
- "Role of legalization of abortions in population control" (1964)
- "Careers for Medical Women in India" (1964)
- "Ante-natal diagnosis" (1966)
- "Obstetrics Then and Now" (1968)

== Honours ==
In 1945, Jhirad was awarded an MBE by the British government. In 1947, she was elected a Fellow of the Royal College of Obstetricians and Gynaecologists. In 1966, she was awarded the Padma Shri. The Venusian crater Jhirad was named after her.

== Personal life ==
Jhirad wrote a short autobiography in 1975, which informed her niece's biography of her, A Dream Realised: Biography of Dr Jerusha J. Jhirad (1990). She died in 1984, aged 93 years.
