= Ariadne (crater) =

Crater on Venus

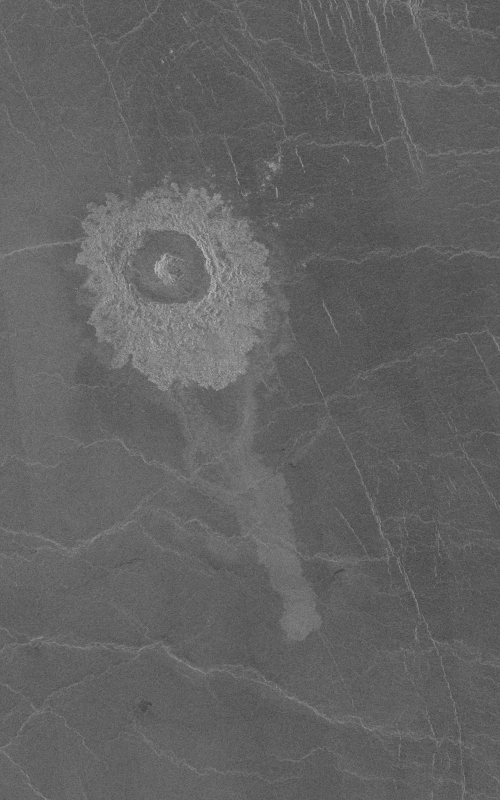
- Ariadne Crater viewed by Magellan.
- Feature type: Impact crater
- Location: Venus
- Coordinates: 43.9°N 0.0°E
- Diameter: 23.6 km
- Eponym: Ariadne

Ariadne is a crater on Venus. Its central peak serves as the prime meridian of the planet, a status formerly held by a crater known as Eve until relocated.
