= Azar Andami =

Iranian physician and bacteriologist

- Born: December 1926 (Note: One source claims her date of birth to be 8 December 1926, while another claims her date of birth to be 16 December 1926.); Rasht, Iran
- Died: August 1984, (Note: One source claims her date of death to be 19 August 1984, while another claims 28 August 1984.) Age 57; Tehran, Iran
- Resting place: Behesht-e Zahra Cemetery
- Education: University of Tehran
- Known for: First El Tor Vaccine
- Spouse: Mansour Khalatbari
- Children: 3
- Scientific career
- Fields: Microbiology
- Workplaces: Pasteur Institute of Iran

Azar Andami (Persian: آذر اندامی, December 1926 – August 1984) was an Iranian physician and bacteriologist noted for her development of a cholera vaccine.

== Early life and career ==
Azar Andami was born in 1926 in Saghrisazan neighborhood of Rasht. She was the fourth child and the only daughter of the family. She finished elementary school in Rasht women's primary school with one year of academic leap. After graduating from the ninth year of general education at Forough High School in Rasht, her father, despite being an intellectual, prevented her from continuing her education and sent her to the Rasht Preparatory University. she graduated from Daneshsara in 1946; In 1947, she was hired by the Ministry of Culture and became a teacher. In 1951, while working, she received a natural science diploma with various exams. In 1953, she participated in the entrance exam of the University of Tehran in the field of medicine of this university; where she attended and then graduated in 1958 as a Doctor of Medicine. At first, she specialised in gynaecology. She moved to the Pasteur Institute in Tehran, and then later to Paris to study bacteriology.

Andami published several scholarly papers and invented a vaccine against cholera, a bacterial disease primarily caused by drinking contaminated water.

== Development of EL Tor vaccine ==
From 1934 to 1967, a cholera-like disease (El Tor) spread in Iran and many other countries. El Tor is an acute diarrheal disease caused by the cholera bacterium. The symptoms of the disease originate from a toxin that is infected by germs in the small intestine of people. Therefore, germs are spread through human feces in the environment and contaminate water and food. In those circumstances, the only way to protect from infection with the toxin was through use of a cholera vaccine. At the time, the only vaccine preparation center in Iran was the Pasteur Institute in Iran. Andami developed an effective vaccine for El Tor which was produced by the Pasteur Institute for use in protecting Iranians and then converted to mass production for use in neighboring countries.

== Death and legacy ==
She died in Tehran on 19 August 1984 at the age of 57. A crater, named "Andami", on the planet Venus was named in her honour by the International Astronomical Union.

== See also ==
- List of craters on Venus
- List of Iranian women scientists and engineers
