= Zinaida Aksentyeva =

Ukrainian/Soviet astronomer

Zinaïda Aksentieva
- Born: Аксентьєва Зінаїда Миколаївна; July 25, 1900; Odessa, Russian Empire
- Died: April 8, 1969 (aged 68); Poltava, Ukrainian SSR, USSR
- Education: Odessa Institute of Public Education
- Occupations: Astronomer, Geophysicist

Zinaïda Mikolaïevna Aksentieva (Ukrainian: Зінаїда Миколаївна Аксентьєва; July 25, 1900 – April 8, 1969) was a Ukrainian/Soviet astronomer and geophysicist.

== Life ==
Aksentieva or Aksentyeva was born in Odessa in 1900. She graduated from Odessa Institute of Public Education in 1924. She worked on mapping gravity and her observatory was one of the first to be able to accurately find the centre of the earth. She worked in Poltava Observatory. She became the observatory director in 1951. Her areas of study were tidal deformation of the earth and gravimeter Earth profiles.

She has a crater on Venus that is named in her honour. The scientist was the first to organize a study of slope fluctuations at great depths in the mines of Kryvorizhye, Donbass, and Carpathians, and the first in the USSR to observe tidal changes in gravity using a gravimeter. Together with like-minded people, she prepared a general program of stars for latitudinal observations in Poltava and Irkutsk, information about which was sent to the central international time bureau. Aksentieva died in 1969 in Poltava where her observatory was.
