= Dickinson (crater) =

Crater on Venus

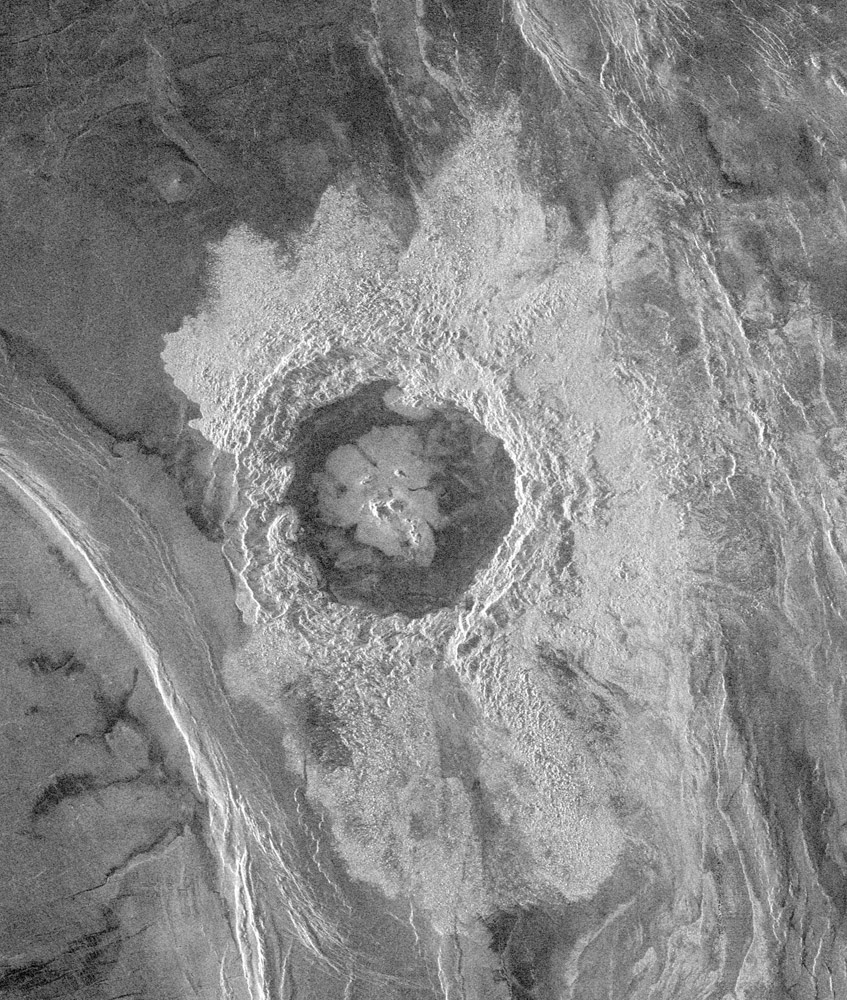
- Radar image of Dickinson crater
- Location: Venus
- Coordinates: 74.6°N 177.2°E
- Diameter: 69 km
- Eponym: Emily Dickinson

Dickinson crater is located at 74.6 degrees north latitude and 177.2 east longitude, in the northeastern Atalanta Region of Venus. It is 69 kilometers (43 mi) in diameter. The crater is complex, characterized by a partial central ring and a floor flooded by radar-dark and radar-bright materials. Hummocky, rough-textured ejecta extend all around the crater, except to the west. The lack of ejecta to the west may indicate that the impactor that produced the crater was an oblique impact from the west. Extensive radar-bright flows that emanate from the crater's eastern walls may represent large volumes of impact melt, or they may be the result of volcanic material released from the subsurface during the cratering event.

The crater was named after Emily Dickinson, an American poet.
