= Yevgenia Bugoslavskaya =

Soviet astronomer (1899-1960)

Professor Yevgenia Yakovlevna Bugoslavskaya
- Евгения Яковлевна Бугославская
- Born: December 21, 1899; Moscow
- Died: May 30, 1960 (aged 60)
- Citizenship: USSR
- Education: Moscow State University (1924)
- Awards: Venus crater named in her honour
- Scientific career
- Fields: Astronomy, Astrometry, Solar physics
- Institutions: Moscow State University

Yevgenia Yakovlevna Bugoslavskaya (21 December 1899 – 30 May 1960) was a Soviet astronomer. She had a lifelong career in astronomy and became professor of astronomy at Moscow University.

Alternative spelling of her name, Evgeniia Iakovlevna Bugoslavskaia.

== Life ==
Bugoslavskaya was born in Moscow. She grew up in the Moscow suburbs and had an early enthusiasm for astronomy. As teenagers she and her twin sister Natalia paid many visits to the observatory of the Moscow Society of Folk Universities located in the Lubjanca district which was open to the public as part of an educational programme. She was also a recreational pianist and singer.

In 1924 she graduated from Moscow State University . In 1925–1928 she undertook postgraduate studies at the Astronomical and Geodetic Institute at Moscow State University. In 1928–1932 she worked in the geodetic institute, and from 1932 at the Sternberg Astronomical Institute (SAI). Beginning in 1934 she taught at Moscow State University and from 1949 was professor there.

== Work ==
She did major works in the field of photographic astrometry and studies of the Sun . She determined (1936–1937) the proper motions of stars in the eastern branch of the dark nebulae of Perseus, Taurus and the Orion Nebula . She studied observations of double stars using a 38 cm astrograph . She was one of the leaders of the expedition which monitored the solar corona at various points of the USSR during the total solar eclipse on June 19, 1936. She was involved in the processing of observations made with a view to establishing the structure of the corona and the fact of its rotation.

She was one of the leaders of observations during total solar eclipses of 1941, 1945, 1952 and 1954 participating in the processing of observations.

She studied the fine structure of the solar corona and its inner movements based on eclipse data between 1887–1941 . She worked on equipping the SAI Observatory on the Lenin Hills with modern equipment.

She is the author of the Russian astronomy textbook "Photographic astrometry".

A crater on the planet Venus is named Bugoslavskaya in her honour.

== Sources ==
- Reports on Astronomy edited by Jacqueline Bergeron, Springer Science & Business Media, 2012 . Springer Science & Business Media, 2012. ISBN 9401111006
- Bronshten, Vitali A., and Mikhail M. Dagaev. Evgeniia Iakovlevna Bugoslavskaia. In Vsesoiuznoe astronomo-geodezicheskoe obshchestvo. Biulleten', no. 29 (36), 1961: 57–59. port. QB1.V752, no. 29 (36)
- Bugoslavskaia, Evgeniia Iakovlevna. In Kolchinskii, Il'ia G., Alla A. Korsun', and Modest G. Rodriges. Astronomy; biograficheskii spravochnik. Izd. 2, dop. i perer. Kiev, Naukova dumka, 1986. p. 58–59. port. QB35.K58 1986
- Evgeniia Iakovlevna Bugoslavskaia (1899–1960). In Astronomicheskii kalendar'. Peremennaia ch. vyp. 64; 1961. Moskva, Gos. izd-vo fiziko – matematicheskoi literatury, 1960. p. 317–318. port. QB9.A75, 1961
