= Valentina Fedorets =

Soviet astronomer

Valentina Aleksandrovna Fedorets (Russian: Валентина Александровна Федорец) was a Soviet astronomer.

== Life ==
Valentina Fedorets was born in 1923 and died in 1976. The Venusian crater Fedorets is named in her honor.
