= Quimby (crater) =

Crater on Venus

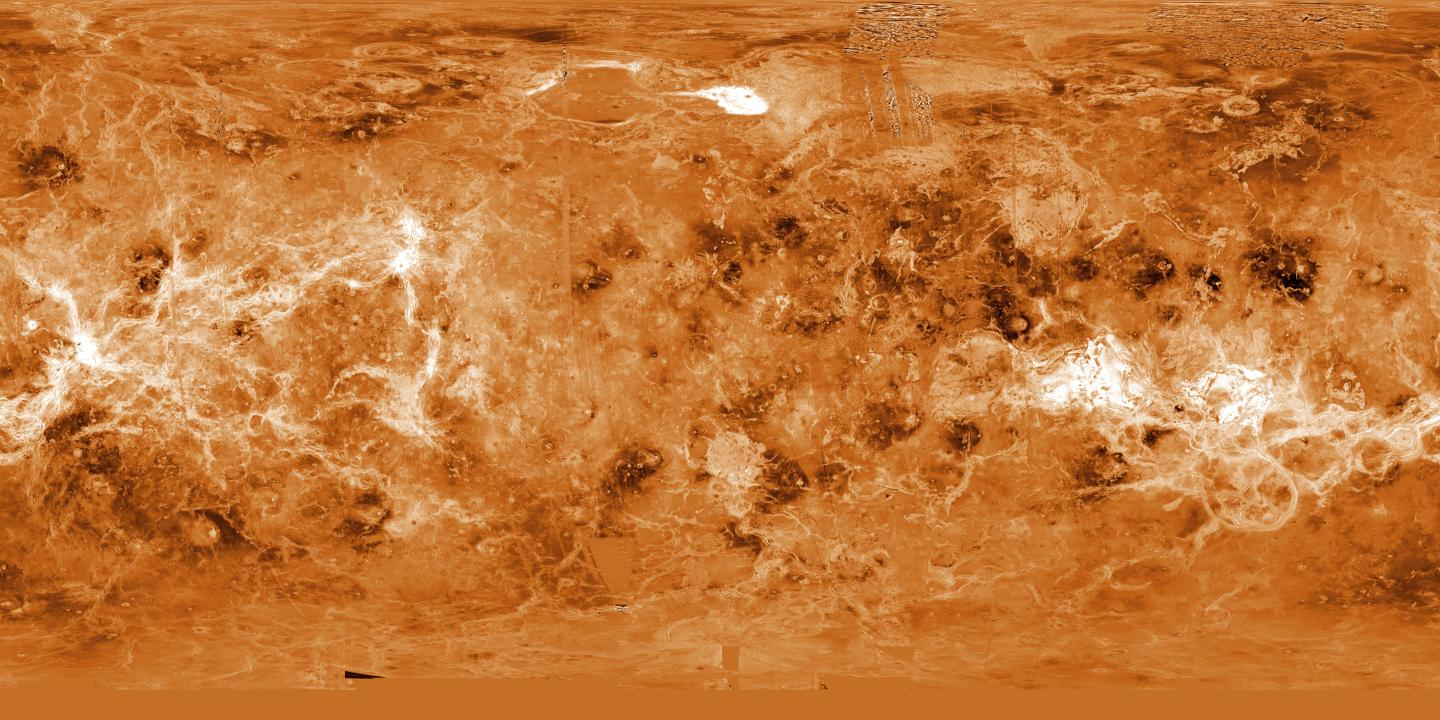
- Magellan radar image of Quimby. The black area indicates missing data. Location of the Quimby crater marked with a blue pin on the surface of Venus.
- Planet: Venus
- Coordinates: 5.7°S 76.7°E
- Quadrangle: Ix Chel Chasma
- Diameter: 23.2 km
- Depth: 6054.24 km
- Eponym: Harriet Quimby

Quimby is an impact crater on Venus. The crater, 23.2 km in diameter, is located in the Aphrodite Terra, which is the largest of the three continental regions on the planet.

== Discovery ==
The crater was discovered by the Magellan spacecraft, which was launched in 1989 to map the surface of Venus. The first three mapping cycles of the orbiter were undertaken primarily to form a map of the Venusian surface and determine the topographic relief of the planet. Most of the surface of Venus, including the Aphrodite Terra region wherein the crater is located, was mapped in the first cycle of the spacecraft's mission, which was done between September 1990 and May 1991.

== Naming ==
The crater was named after American aviatrix Harriet Quimby, in line with the theme of naming craters and paterae on Venus after female personalities or female first names (depending on their size). Among other achievements, Quimby was the first woman to fly solo across the English Channel.

The proposed nomenclature was approved by the International Astronomical Union in 1997.

== Location ==
The crater is located close to the equator of the planet, in the highland continental shelf of Aphrodite Terra. It is located south of the Ovda Regio plateau within the landmass. The land on which the crater lies is classified to be part of a tessera or mountain belt. The topography of the terrain contains many fractures, which indicates large compressive forces acting in the region.

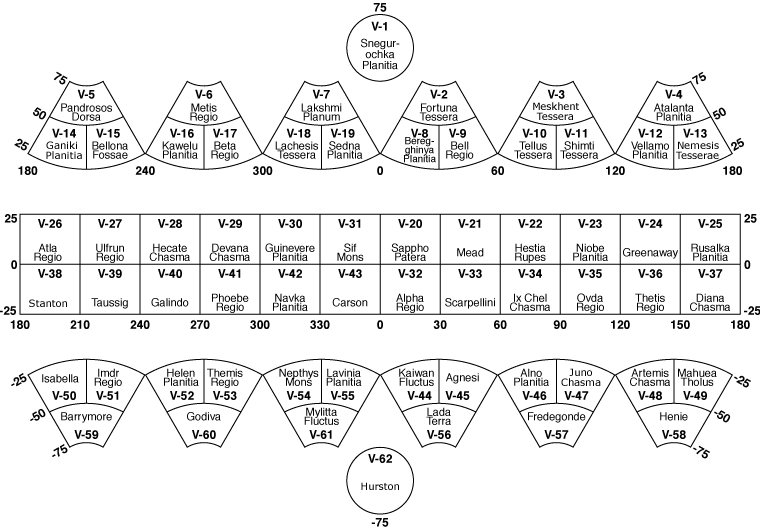
A diagram of Venus' quadrangles at a scale of 1:5,000,000. Quimby is located in the Ix Chel Chasma quadrangle, which is identified by the USGS code V-34. The quadrangles V-34 to V-37 anD V-46 to V-49 constitute Aphrodite Terra.

== Geological structure ==
The crater, having a diameter of 23.2 km, has a well-formed rim with a completeness score of 1 (the maximum score). Its planform is classified to be circular in shape. There is a central peak in the crater.

The floor of the crater exhibits high reflectivity and appears bright. The surrounding terrain lies at an elevation of 6054.24 km relative to the crater base.

== See also ==
- Aphrodite Terra
- List of craters on Venus
