= Balch (crater) =

Crater on Venus

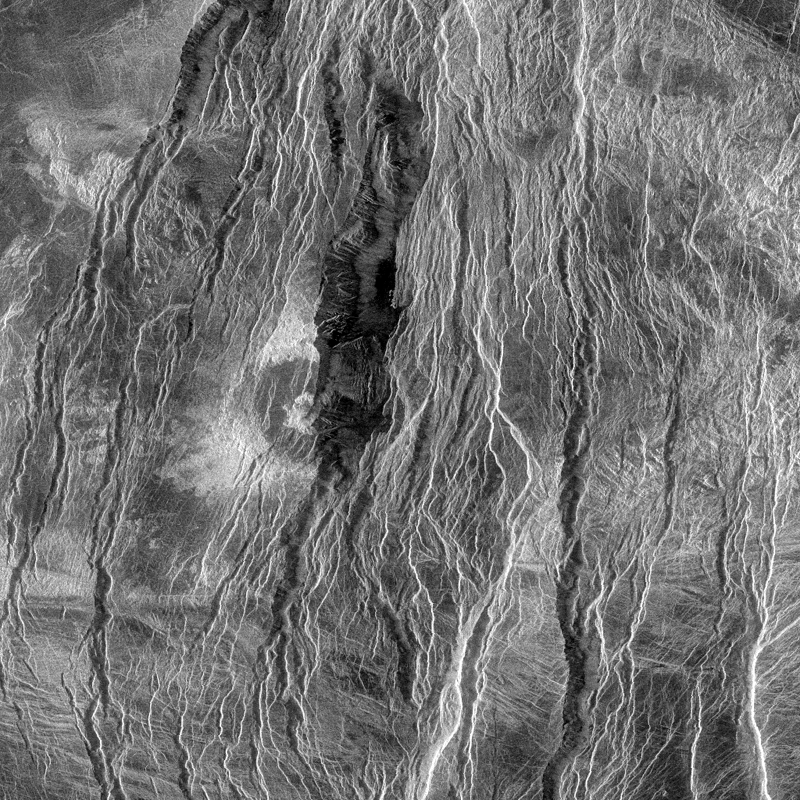
- Magellan radar map of Balch
- Location: Venus
- Coordinates: 29.9°N 282.9°E
- Diameter: 40 km
- Eponym: Emily Balch

Balch is a crater on Venus at latitude 29.9, longitude 282.9 in Devana Chasma, Central Beta Regio. It is 40 km in diameter and named after Emily Balch, though it was originally designated Somerville crater. This crater is one of the few examples of tectonically modified craters seen on Venus. Approximately half the crater was subsumed into a valley. The absence of such craters indicates a possible cessation of tectonic deformation on Venus at some point in history.
