= Grimke (crater) =

Crater on Venus

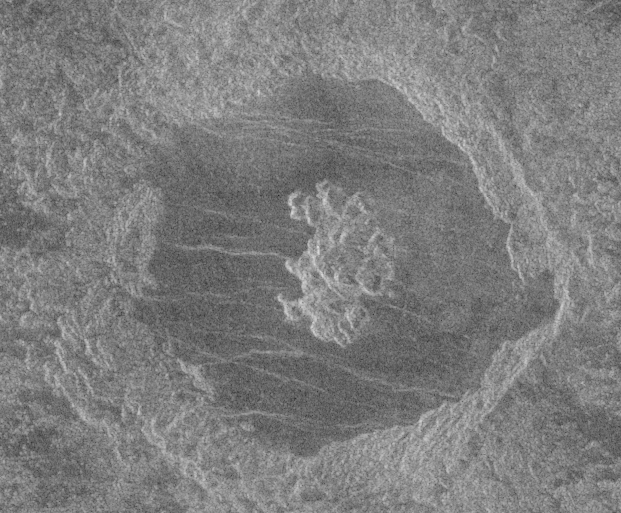
- Radar map of Grimke crater by the Magellan probe
- Location: Venus
- Coordinates: 17.2°N 215.3°E
- Diameter: 34.8 km
- Eponym: Sarah Grimké

Grimke is a crater on Venus, located at latitude 17.2, longitude 215.3. It is 34.8 km in diameter and is named after Sarah Grimké, an American abolitionist.
