= Edgeworth (surname) =

Edgeworth is an English toponymic surname. It probably derives from Edgeworth in Gloucestershire, but the name is long established in Ireland, where it is claimed that the family settled in County Longford in 1583.

Notable people with the surname include:

- Edward Edgeworth (died 1595), Anglican bishop
- Henry Essex Edgeworth (1745–1807), Irish Catholic priest and confessor of Louis XVI
- Kenneth Edgeworth (1880–1972), Irish astronomer, economist and engineer
- Rebecca Edgeworth, American politician
- Richard Lovell Edgeworth (1744–1817), Anglo-Irish scientist, inventor, writer and educator
  - His son Michael Pakenham Edgeworth (1812–1881), botanist
  - His daughter Maria Edgeworth (1767–1849), novelist
    - His grandson Francis Ysidro Edgeworth (1845–1926), statistician and economist
- Robert Edgeworth-Johnstone (1900–1994), British chemical engineer and inventor

Fictional characters:

- Miles Edgeworth, character from the Ace Attorney video game series
- Professor Edgeworth, character from the Doctor Who serial The Twin Dilemma
