= Ruth (Venusian crater) =

Crater on Venus

- Location: Venus
- Coordinates: 19.85°N 43.28°E
- Diameter: 18.5 km
- Depth: 6051.365 km

Ruth is an impact crater on Venus. The crater, based on data provided by the Magellan spacecraft, has an estimated diameter of 18.5 kilometres (11.5 mi) and an elevation (measured as local planetary radius in kilometers) of 6,051.365 kilometres (3,760.144 mi).
