= Sophia (crater) =

Crater on Venus

- Location: Venus
- Coordinates: 28.6°S 18.8°E
- Diameter: 11.7 km
- Eponym: Greek first name

Sophia is a crater on Venus with a diameter of 17.6 km. The crater is named for a Greek female first name Sophia. The name was approved in 1994. Geographic coordinates: 28.6° S, 18.8° E.
