= Moore (crater on Venus) =

Crater on Venus

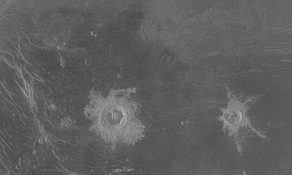
- Moore is the structure on the left side of the image
- Location: Venus
- Coordinates: 30.4°S 111.6°W
- Diameter: 21.1 km
- Eponym: Marianne Moore

Moore is a 21.1 km diameter crater on the surface of Venus. It has a continuous ejecta radius of 17.3 km, and a wall width of 4.6 km. It is beside to another crater named Xenia, and is in the Helen Planitia.

Its name derives after the American modernist, Marianne Moore. It was accepted by the IAU in the year 1994.
