= Edgeworth Island =

Island in Nunavut, Canada

- Location within Nunavut Location within Canada

Geography
- Location: Peel Sound
- Coordinates: 73°52′N 97°13′W
- Archipelago: Arctic Archipelago

Administration
- Canada
- Nunavut: Nunavut
- Region: Qikiqtaaluk

Demographics
- Population: Uninhabited

Edgeworth Island is a member of the Arctic Archipelago in the territory of Nunavut. The uninhabited island lies north of Lyons Point, Prince of Wales Island in Peel Sound, outside the entrance of the Baring Channel. Russell Island is to the northwest.
