= Abington (crater) =

- Planet: Venus
- Coordinates: 47.48°S 277.42°W
- Quadrangle: Helen Planitia and Themis Regio
- Diameter: 21.7 km
- Eponym: Frances Abington

Abington is a crater on Venus, with a diameter of 21.7 km. It has a continuous ejecta radius of 15.1.

== Naming ==
Its name was adopted by the International Astronomical Union (IAU) on October 1, 2006. Abington is named for English actress Frances Abington.
