= Zakiya (crater) =

Crater on Venus

- Location: Venus
- Coordinates: 20°18′N 331°48′E
- Diameter: 7.50 km (4.66 mi)
- Eponym: Arabic first name

Zakiya is a 7.50 km diameter crater on the surface of Venus. It has a continuous ejecta radius of 13.1 km. It lies on the undistinguished plains, and it neighbors the Sayers crater, and the Vejas-mate Dorsa.

Its name derives after the Arabic first name. It was accepted by the IAU in the year 1997.
