= Stefania (crater) =

Crater on Venus

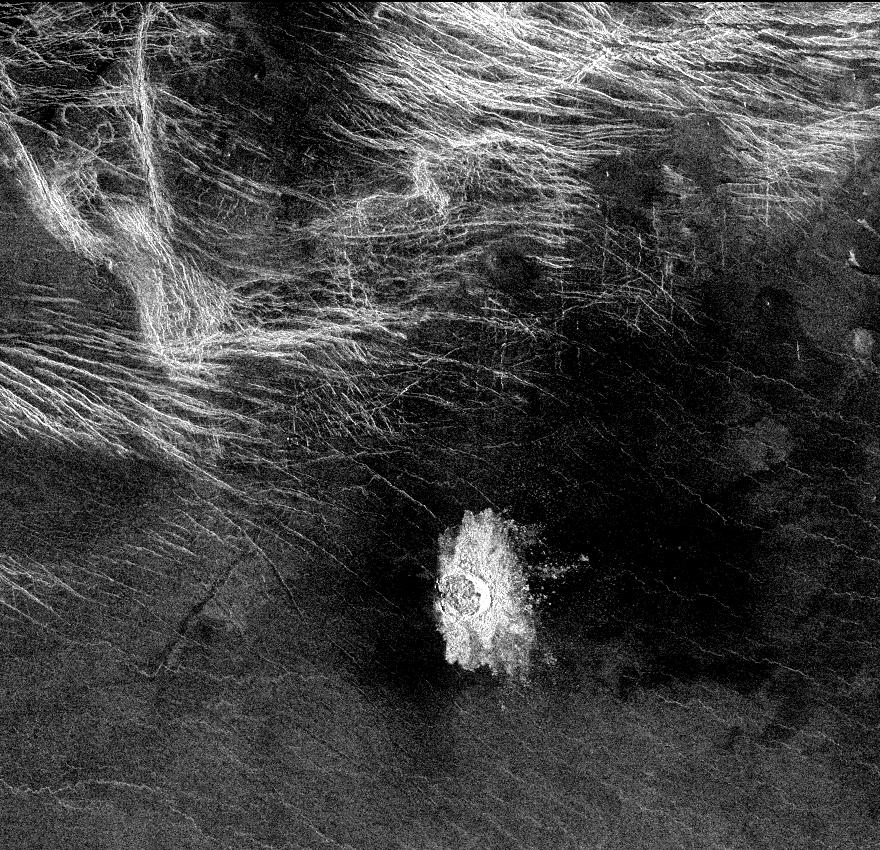
- Location: Venus
- Coordinates: 51.3°N 333.3°E
- Diameter: 11.7 km
- Eponym: Romanian first name

Stefania is a crater on Venus in the northern Sedna Planitia. With a diameter of 11 kilometers (6.8 mi) it is one of the smaller craters on Venus. Because many small meteoroids disintegrate during their passage through the dense atmosphere, there is an absence of craters smaller than 3 kilometers (1.9 mi) in diameter, and even craters smaller than 25 kilometers (16 mi) are relatively scarce. The apron of ejected material suggests that the impacting body made contact with the surface from an oblique angle. Upon closer observation it is possible to delineate secondary craters, impact scars from blocks ejected from the primary crater. A feature associated with this and many other Venusian craters is a radar-dark halo. Since dark radar return signifies a smooth surface, it has been hypothesized that an intense shock wave removed or pulverized previously rough surface material or that a blanket of fine material was deposited during or after the impact.
