= Xiao Hong (crater) =

Crater on Venus

- Location: Venus
- Coordinates: 43.5°S 101.7°E
- Diameter: 38.70 km
- Eponym: Xiao Hong, Chinese novelist (1911–1942)

Xiao Hong is a 38.70 km diameter impact crater located on the surface of Venus.

Its name derives, and is named after a Chinese novelist named Xiao Hong. It was accepted by the International Astronomical Union in the year 1991.

== Description ==
Xiao Hong is an impact structure with a continuous ejecta radius of 33.2 km, and a wall width of 5.8 km. A somewhat brighter diffuse area in the south west direction at ∼100 km from the flow crater Xiao Hong is darker in the second cycle by 1.0–1.8 decibels compared to the first cycle of observation. This surficial deposit is large and is stacked on several boundaries between volcanic plains.
