= Qarlygha (crater) =

Crater on Venus

- Feature type: Crater
- Location: Southern Venus
- Diameter: 9.30 km
- Naming: Kazakh first name

Qarlygha is an impact crater on Venus. The crater, based on data provided by the Magellan spacecraft, has an estimated diameter of 9.3 kilometres (5.8 mi) and an elevation of 6,051.66 kilometres (3,760.33 mi).
