= Wheatley (crater) =

Crater on Venus

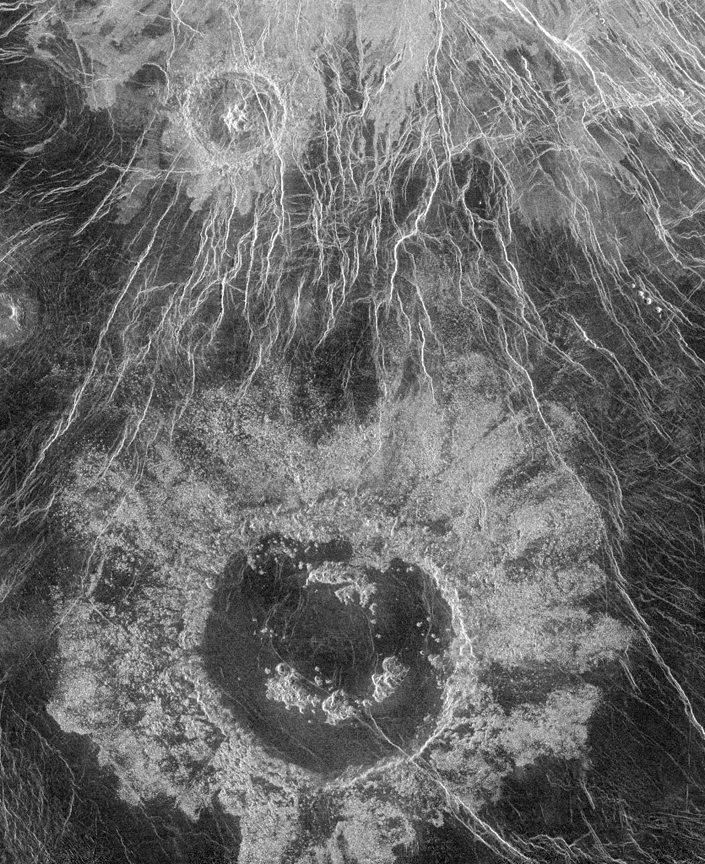
- Magellan radar image
- Location: Venus
- Coordinates: 16.6°N 268.0°E
- Diameter: 74.8 km (46.5 mi)
- Eponym: Phillis Wheatley

Wheatley is a crater on Venus at latitude 16.6, longitude 268 in Asteria Regio. It was named in 1994 after Phillis Wheatley, the first black writer of note in America (1753–1784).

== Description ==
Wheatley is a 74.8 km diameter impact crater located on Venus. Wheatley is a peak ring crater, a slightly fractured crater, and a singular crater. Its structure shows a radar bright ejecta pattern and a flat floor with some raised areas and faulting.
