= Xenia (crater) =

Crater on Venus

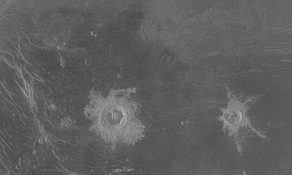
- Xenia is the structure on the right side of the image
- Location: Venus
- Diameter: 13.50 km
- Eponym: Greek first name

Xenia is a crater on the surface of Venus. It got its name after a first name from Greek, Xenia. and has a continuous ejecta radius of 23.7 km.

Xenia Is neighboring the crater Moore and is in the Helen Planitia.
