= Markham (crater) =

Crater on Venus

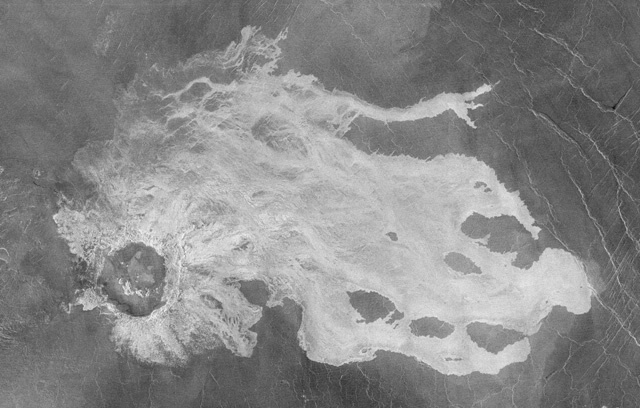
- Location: Venus
- Coordinates: 4.2°S 155.6°E
- Diameter: 71.8 km (44.6 mi)
- Eponym: Beryl Markham

Markham is a 71.8 km diameter impact crater on the surface of Venus.

== Geology and characteristics ==
Markham has a diameter of 71.8 km, with a continuous ejecta radius of 80.9 km, and a wall width of 5.9 km. Markham is most notable for its large outflow of highly fluid materials of a catastrophic style, including multiple branches which flows over depressions in its surroundings topography. The flow materials required to form the outflow were probably supplied at a more higher rate than 10^{10} m^{3}/s and the durations of material supply were less than 100 seconds. The depressions are roughly circular and are visible in the topography data, but not visible in the radar imagery. Such outflows are thought to consists of mixture of melted and fractured rock, and studies of the lobate margins and surface roughnesses suggest that they behave like crosses between lava flows and debris flows on Earth. The outflow from this crater's ejecta traversed a slope of extremely low gradient less than 0.1 degree for 450 km, leaving an extremely rough, radar-bright surface. The nature of the flow is indicated by its being diverted by the foreground hill, which is less than 200 meters high. (Note: One or more of the preceding sentences incorporates text from these sources, which are in the public domain: "Magellan's View of Crater Markham, 0° N, 163° E". NASA. Jet Propulsion Labatory.)

== Naming ==
In Venus, craters are named after deceased women who made fundamental contributions to their field.

Before the crater was known as Markham, It was briefly known unofficially as Franklin; the earlier name wasn't approved by the International Astronomical Union. It then got its official name in the year 1994, where they named the crater in honor of the English aviator, Beryl Markham.
