= Xi Wang (crater) =

Crater on Venus

- Location: Venus
- Coordinates: 14°N 208°E
- Diameter: 7.70 km
- Eponym: Chinese first name

Xi Wang is a crater on the surface of Venus. It lies in Atla Regio, east of Tkashi-mapa Chasma. It has a continuous ejecta radius of 16.4 km.

It is named after a Chinese given name. It was accepted by the IAU in the year 1997.
