= Ximena (crater) =

Crater on Venus

- Location: Venus
- Coordinates: 68.2°S 243.6°E
- Diameter: 12.8 km (8.0 mi)
- Eponym: Portuguese first name.

Ximena is a 12.8 km diameter crater in Nuptadi Planitia on Venus. It has a continuous ejecta radius of 10.8 km.

It is named after a Portuguese given name. It was accepted by the IAU in the year 1997. On Venus, craters smaller than 20 km in diameter are named after common female given names.
