= Irina (crater) =

Crater on Venus

- Location: Venus
- Coordinates: 35.0°N 91.2°E
- Diameter: 15.2 km
- Eponym: Russian first name

Irina is a crater on Venus with a diameter of 15.2 km. The crater is named for a Russian female first name Irina. The name was approved in 1994. Geographic coordinates: 35.0° N, 91.2° E.
