= Mariko (crater) =

Crater on Venus

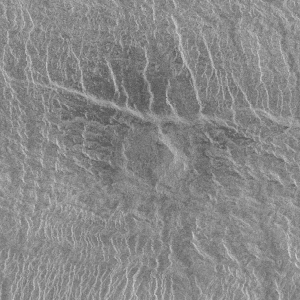
- Radar image of Venus Crater Mariko
- Location: Venus
- Coordinates: 23.3°S 132.9°E
- Diameter: 11.2 km

Mariko is an impact crater on Venus. In 1997 it was named for a common female Japanese first name, in accordance with planetary nomenclature rules for Venusian craters under 20 km in diameter.

The crater is located in the V-36 quadrangle of Venus.
