= Xantippe (crater) =

Crater on Venus

- Location: Venus
- Coordinates: 10.9°S 11.8°E
- Diameter: 40.4 km
- Eponym: Xanthippe, the wife of Socrates

Xantippe is a 40.4 km diameter impact crater on the surface of Venus. It has a continuous ejecta radius of 42.1 km.

Its name derives, and is named after an ancient Athenian woman named Xanthippe, the wife of Socrates.
