= Edgeworth (crater) =

Crater on Venus

- Location: Venus
- Coordinates: 32.2°N 22.8°E
- Diameter: 29 km
- Eponym: Maria Edgeworth, Irish writer

Edgeworth is a 29 km diameter crater on the surface of Venus. It has a continuous ejecta radius of 30.7 km, and a wall width of 5.3 km. A distinctive feature about the crater is that it has a well‑preserved central structure diameter of 7.5 km. The crater lies on an undistinguished plain near the Modron Corona and in the Bereghinya Planitia.

Its name derives after the Irish writer, Maria Edgeworth. It was accepted by the IAU in the year 1985.
