= Venus Orbiting Imaging Radar =

Cancelled 1983 U.S. mission to Venus

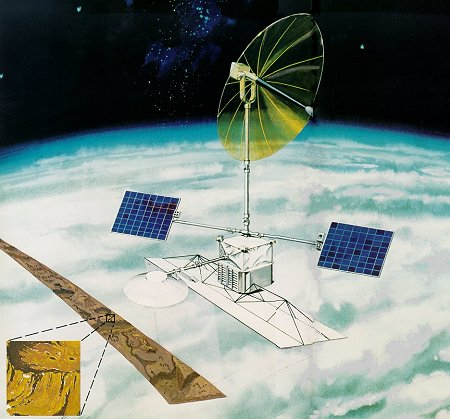
- Venus Orbiting Imaging Radar (VOIR) illustration
- Mission type: Venus orbiter
- Operator: NASA
- Mission duration: 126 days (planned)

Spacecraft properties
- Manufacturer: NASA

Start of mission
- Launch date: 1987
- Rocket: Space Shuttle with IUS

Transponders
- Bandwidth: 1 Mbit per second

Venus Orbiting Imaging Radar (VOIR; also called Venus Orbital Imaging Radar) was a planned 1983 U.S. spacecraft mission to Venus that was primarily intended to use a microwave imaging radar to perform mapping of the Venusian surface. The goal was to map up to 50% of the planet's surface down to a resolution of 2 km with the eventual goal of targeting landers and atmospheric probes.

== History ==
A 1978 study evaluated the potential use of synthetic aperture radar to achieve 200 meter resolution. The spacecraft was to be launched from the Space Shuttle using a twin stage IUS in December 1984, and arrive in orbit May 1985. The mission was expected to last until November 1985.

By 1981, the plan was for the spacecraft to launch in 1987 and to use aerobraking to circularize its orbit, whereupon it would be able to generate radar coverage of the entire planet over a period of 126 days. Data transmission rates were 1 Mbit per second, matching the imaging and recording speed. It would have two resolutions: mapping mode of 600 m per line-pair, then a high-resolution mode at 150 m per line-pair.

The mission was cancelled in 1982 when it exceeded its budget limit. In 1983, it was replaced by a less ambitious mission called the Venus Radar Mapper, which was later renamed Magellan.
