= Magellan (spacecraft) =

NASA orbiter mission to Venus (1989–1994)

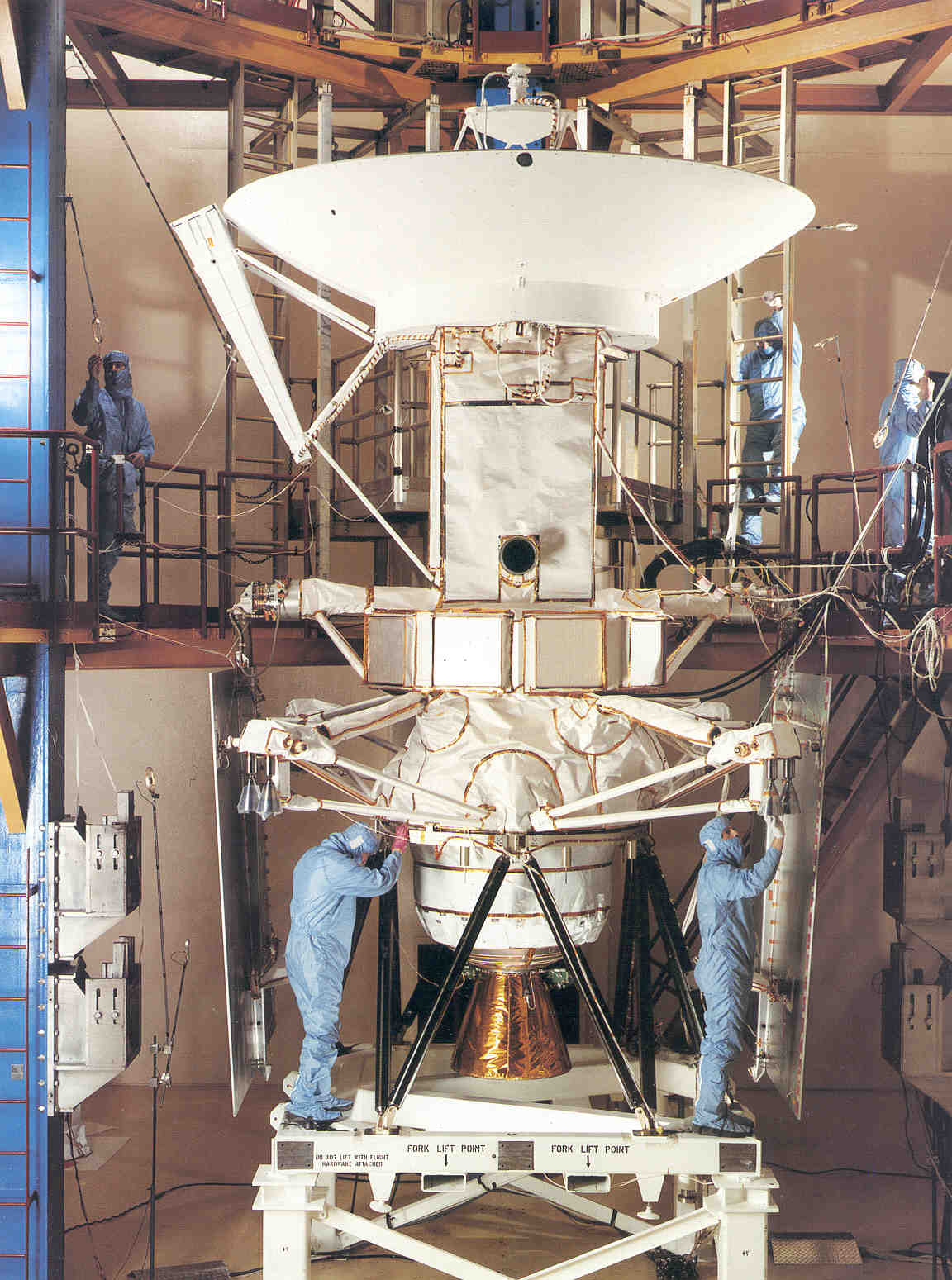
- Magellan with its Star 48B solid rocket motor undergoing final checks at the Kennedy Space Center
- Mission type: Venus orbiter
- Operator: NASA / JPL
- COSPAR ID: 1989-033B
- SATCAT no.: 19969
- Website: science.nasa.gov
- Mission duration: 5 years, 5 months and 9 days

Spacecraft properties
- Manufacturer: Martin Marietta; Hughes Aircraft
- Launch mass: 3,445 kg (7,595 lb)
- Dry mass: 1,035 kg (2,282 lb)
- Power: ~1,030 watts

Start of mission
- Launch date: May 4, 1989, 18:47:00 UTC
- Rocket: Space Shuttle Atlantis; STS-30 / IUS
- Launch site: Kennedy LC-39B

End of mission
- Disposal: Deorbited
- Decay date: October 13, 1994, 10:05:00 UTC

Orbital parameters
- Reference system: Cytherocentric
- Semi-major axis: 10,470 kilometers (6,510 mi)
- Eccentricity: 0.39177
- Pericytherion altitude: 295 kilometers (183 mi)
- Apocytherion altitude: 7,762 kilometers (4,823 mi)
- Inclination: 85.5°
- Period: 3.26 hours

Venus orbiter
- Orbital insertion: August 10, 1990, 17:00:00 UTC
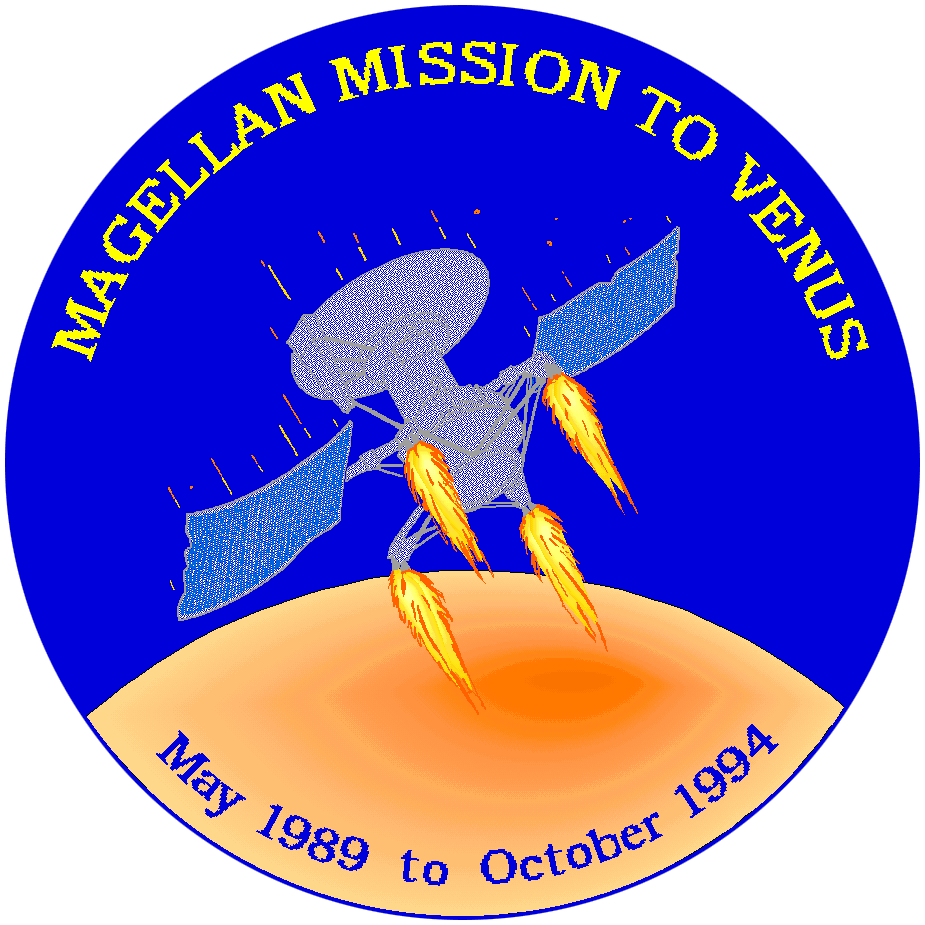
- Legacy insignia for the Magellan mission, commemorating the deorbit of the spacecraft in 1994.

The Magellan spacecraft was a 1,035-kilogram (2,282 lb) robotic space probe launched by NASA on May 4, 1989. Its mission objectives were to map the surface of Venus by using synthetic-aperture radar and to measure the planetary gravitational field.

The Magellan probe was the first interplanetary mission to be launched from the Space Shuttle, the first one to use the Inertial Upper Stage booster, and the first spacecraft to test aerobraking as a method for circularizing its orbit. Magellan was the fifth successful NASA mission to Venus, and it ended an eleven-year gap in U.S. interplanetary probe launches.

== History ==
Beginning in the late 1970s, scientists advocated for a radar mapping mission to Venus. They first sought to construct a spacecraft named the Venus Orbiting Imaging Radar (VOIR), but it became clear that the mission would be beyond the budget constraints during the ensuing years. The VOIR mission was canceled in 1982.

A simplified radar mission proposal was recommended by the Solar System Exploration Committee, and this one was submitted and accepted as the Venus Radar Mapper program in 1983. The proposal included a limited focus and a single primary scientific instrument. In 1985, the mission was renamed Magellan, in honor of the sixteenth-century Portuguese explorer Ferdinand Magellan, known for his exploration, mapping, and circumnavigation of the Earth.

The objectives of the mission included:

- Obtain near-global radar images of the Venusian surface with a resolution equivalent to optical imaging of 1.0 kilometre (0.62 mi) per line pair. (primary)
- Obtain a near-global topographic map with 50 kilometres (31 mi) spatial and 100 metres (330 ft) vertical resolution.
- Obtain near-global gravity field data with 700 kilometres (430 mi) resolution and two to three milligals of accuracy.
- Develop an understanding of the geological structure of the planet, including its density distribution and dynamics.

== Spacecraft design ==
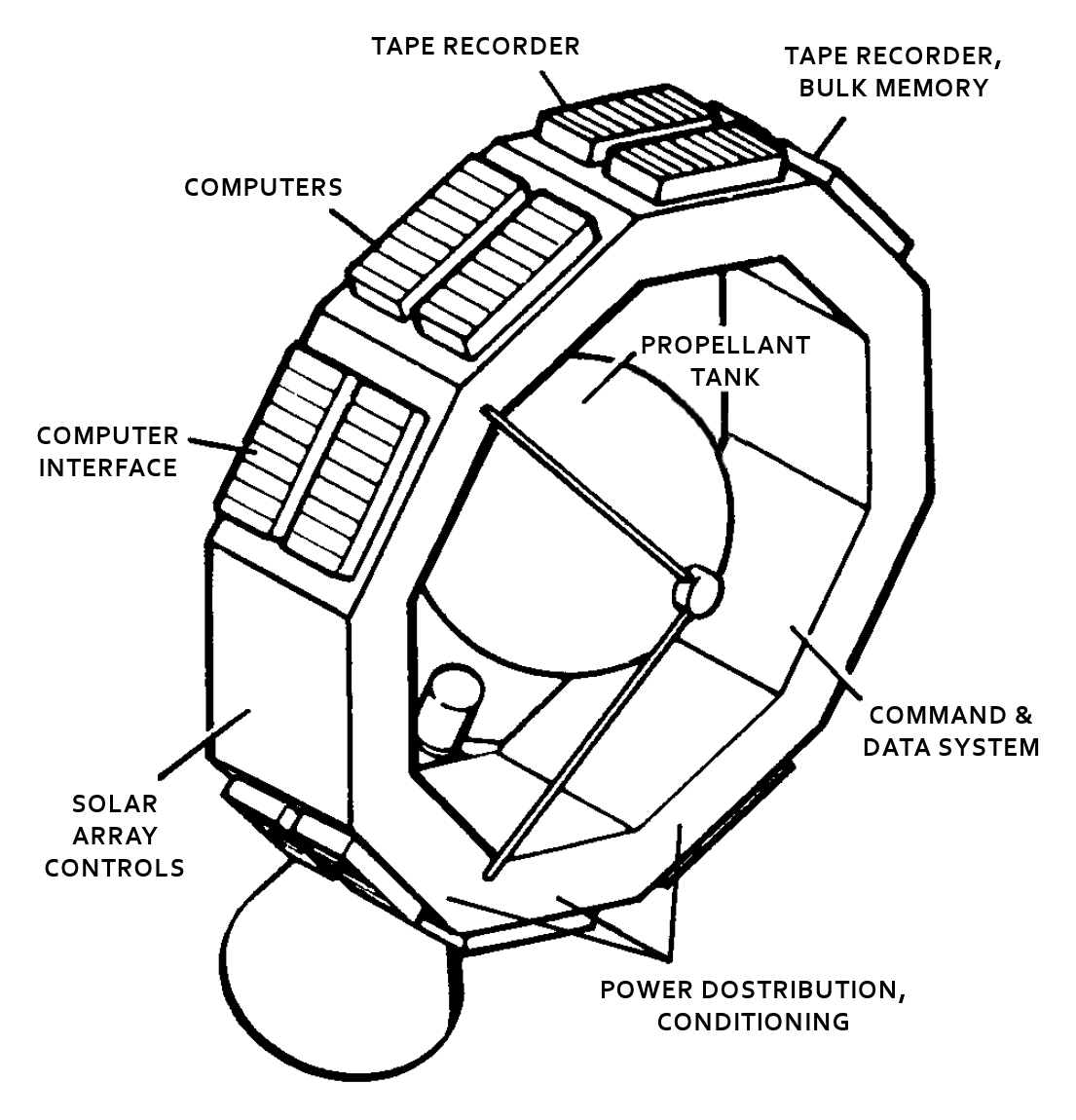
The Voyager probe spacecraft bus that formed the main body of Magellan

The spacecraft was designed and built by the Martin Marietta Company, and the Jet Propulsion Laboratory (JPL) managed the mission for NASA. Elizabeth Beyer served as the program manager and Joseph Boyce served as the lead program scientist for the NASA headquarters. For JPL, Douglas Griffith served as the Magellan project manager and R. Stephen Saunders served as the lead project scientist. Hughes Aircraft Company's Space and Communications Group designed and built the spacecraft's synthetic aperture radar.

To save costs, most of the Magellan probe was made up of flight spare parts and reused design elements from other spacecraft:

Reuse Type Legend
Flight spare
Design reuse

Component	Origin
Attitude control computer	Galileo
Bus	Voyager program
Command and data subsystem	Galileo
High- and low-gain antenna	Voyager program
Medium-gain antenna	Mariner 9
Power distribution unit	Galileo
Propellant tank	Space Shuttle auxiliary power unit
Pyrotechnic control	Galileo
Radio-frequency traveling-wave tube assemblies	Ulysses
Solid rocket motor	Space Shuttle Payload Assist Module
Star scanner	Inertial Upper Stage
Thrusters	Voyager program

The main body of the spacecraft, a spare one from the Voyager missions, was a 10-sided aluminum bus, containing the computers, data recorders, and other subsystems. The spacecraft measured 6.4 meters tall and 4.6 meters in diameter. Overall, the spacecraft weighed 3,445 kilograms.

=== Attitude control and propulsion ===
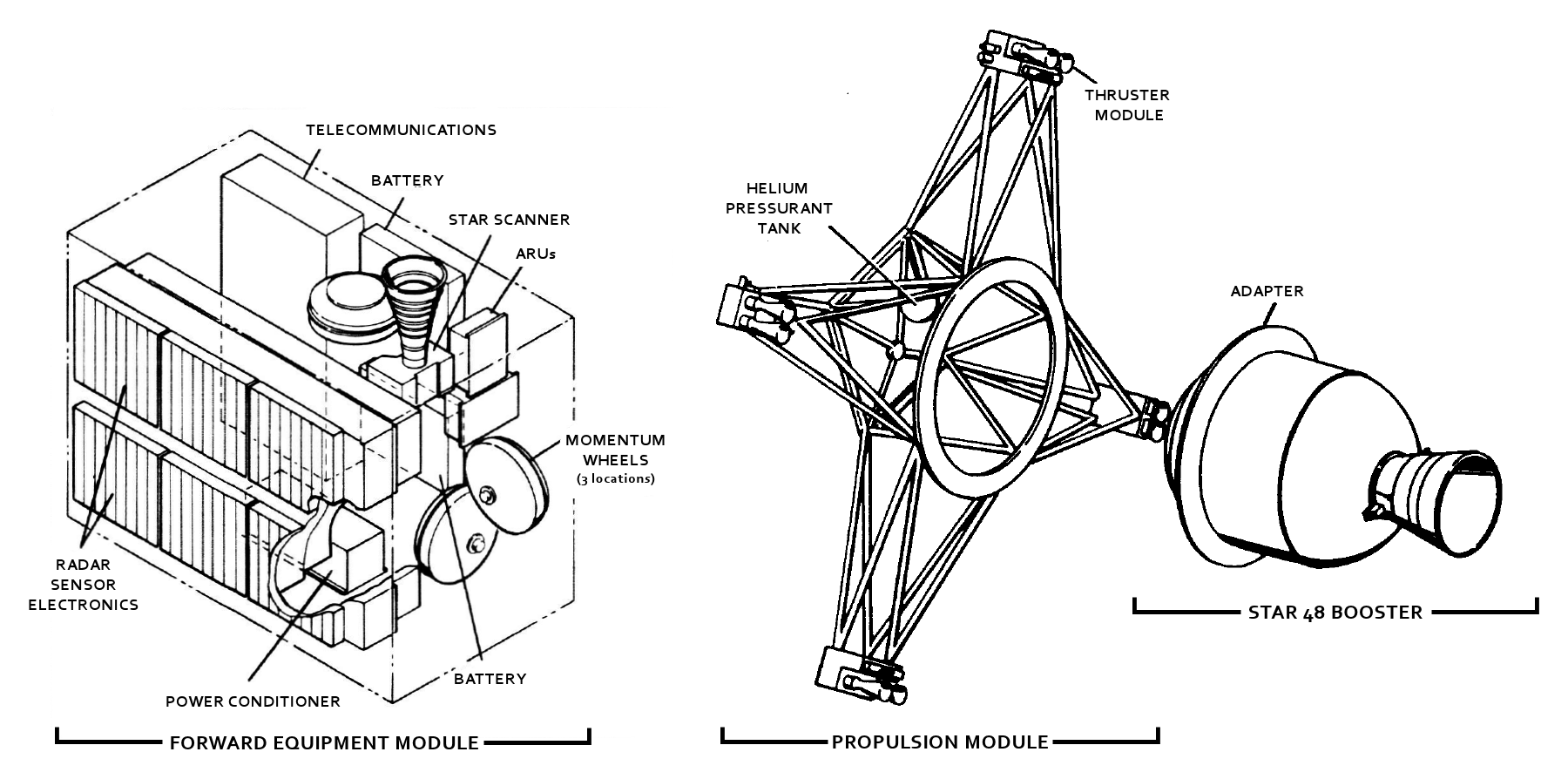
Thrusters, Star 48 booster and the internal components of the Forward Equipment Module

The spacecraft's attitude control (orientation) was designed to be three-axis stabilized, including during the firing of the Star 48B solid rocket motor (SRM) used to place it into orbit around Venus. Prior to Magellan, all spacecraft SRM firings had involved spinning spacecraft, which made control of the SRM a much easier task. In a typical spin mode, any unwanted forces related to SRM or nozzle mis-alignments are cancelled out. In the case of Magellan, the spacecraft design did not lend itself to spinning, so the resulting propulsion system design had to accommodate the challenging control issues with the large Star 48B SRM. The Star 48B, containing 2,014 kg of solid propellant, developed a thrust of ~89 kN (20,000 lbf) shortly after firing; therefore, even a 0.5% SRM alignment error could generate side forces of 445 N (100 lbf). Final conservative estimates of worst-case side forces resulted in the need for eight 445 N thrusters, two in each quadrant, located out on booms at the maximum radius that the Space Shuttle Orbiter Payload Bay would accommodate (4.4-m or 14.5-ft diameter).

The actual propulsion system design consisted of a total of 24 monopropellant hydrazine thrusters fed from a single 71cm (28 in) diameter titanium tank. The tank contained 133 kg (293 lb) of purified hydrazine. The design also included a pyrotechnically-isolated external high pressure tank with additional helium that could be connected to the main tank prior to the critical Venus orbit insertion burn to ensure maximum thrust from the 445 N thrusters during the SRM firing. Other hardware regarding orientation of the spacecraft consists of a set of gyroscopes and a star scanner.

=== Communications ===
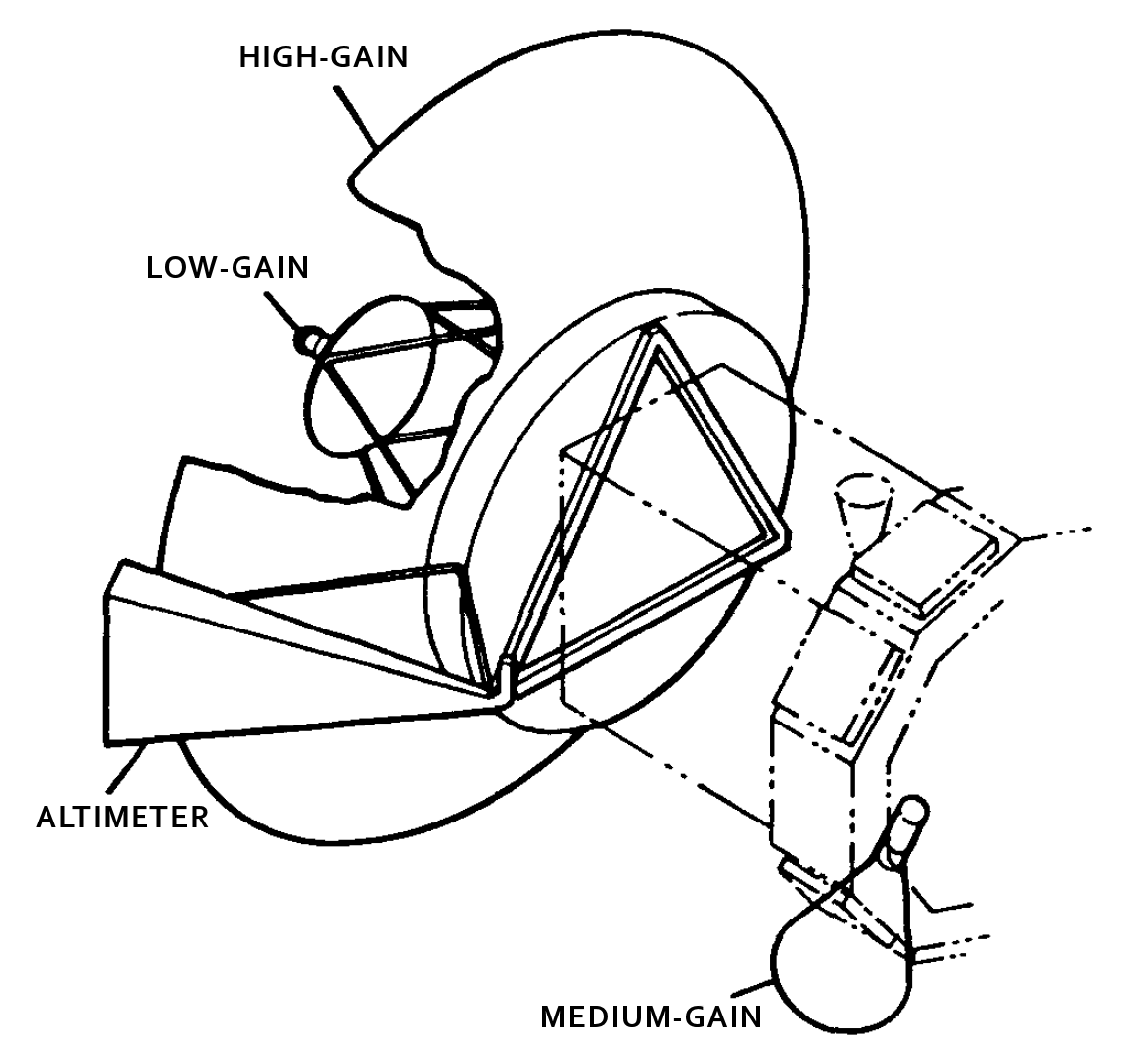
Positions of the three antennas

For communications, the spacecraft included a lightweight graphite/aluminum, 3.7-meter high-gain antenna left over from the Voyager Program and a medium-gain antenna spare from the Mariner 9 mission. A low-gain antenna attached to the high-gain antenna was also included for contingencies. When communicating with the Deep Space Network, the spacecraft was able to simultaneously receive commands at 1.2 kilobits/second in the S-band and transmit data at 268.8 kilobits/second in the X-band.

=== Power ===
Magellan was powered by two square solar arrays, each measuring 2.5 meters across. Together, the arrays supplied 1,200 watts of power at the beginning of the mission. However, over the course of the mission the solar arrays gradually degraded due to frequent, extreme temperature changes. To power the spacecraft while occulted from the Sun, twin 30 amp-hour, 26-cell, nickel-cadmium batteries were included. The batteries recharged as the spacecraft received direct sunlight.

=== Computers and data processing ===
The computing system on the spacecraft was partially modified equipment from the Galileo. There were two ATAC-16 computers forming one redundant system, located in the attitude-control subsystem, and four RCA 1802 microprocessors, as two redundant systems, to control the command and data subsystem (CDS). The CDS was able to store commands for up to three days, and also to autonomously control the spacecraft if problems were to arise while mission operators were not in contact with the spacecraft.

For storing the commands and recorded data, the spacecraft also included two multitrack digital tape recorders, able to store up to 225 megabytes of data until contact with the Earth was restored and the tapes were played back.

=== Scientific instruments ===
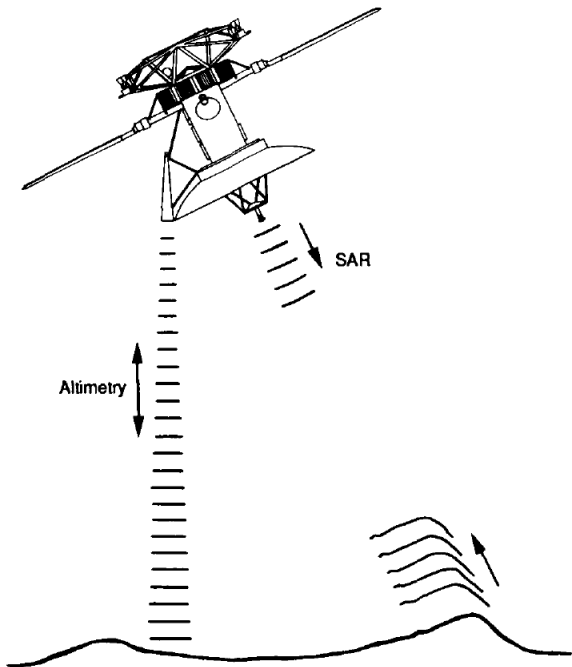
Orientation while collecting data

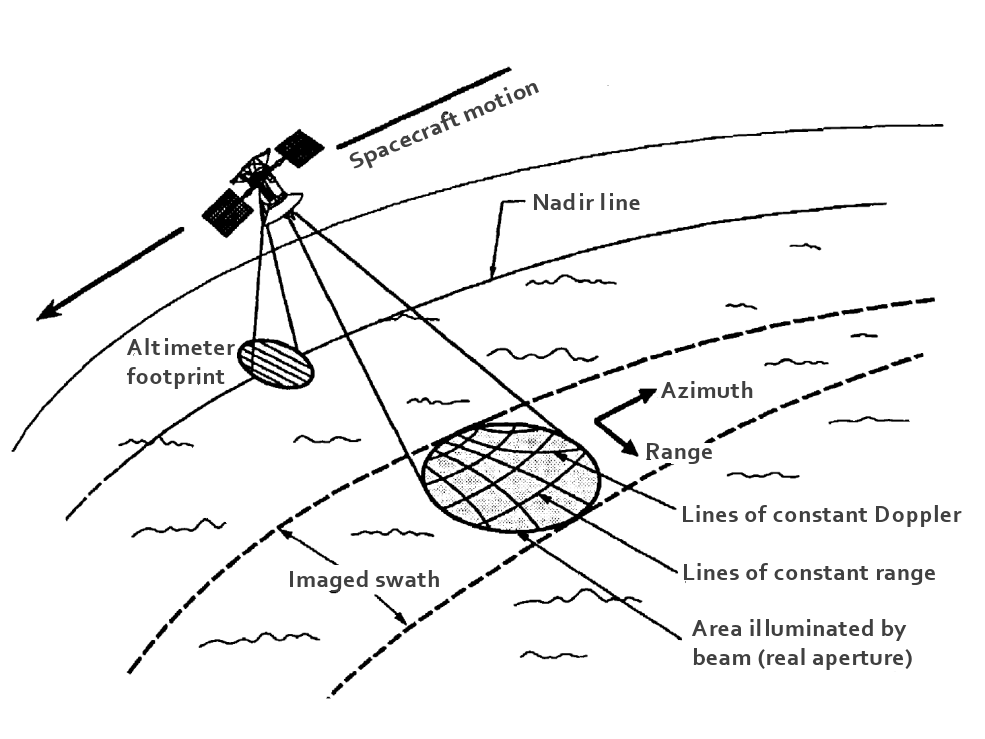
Orbital path for collecting RDRS data

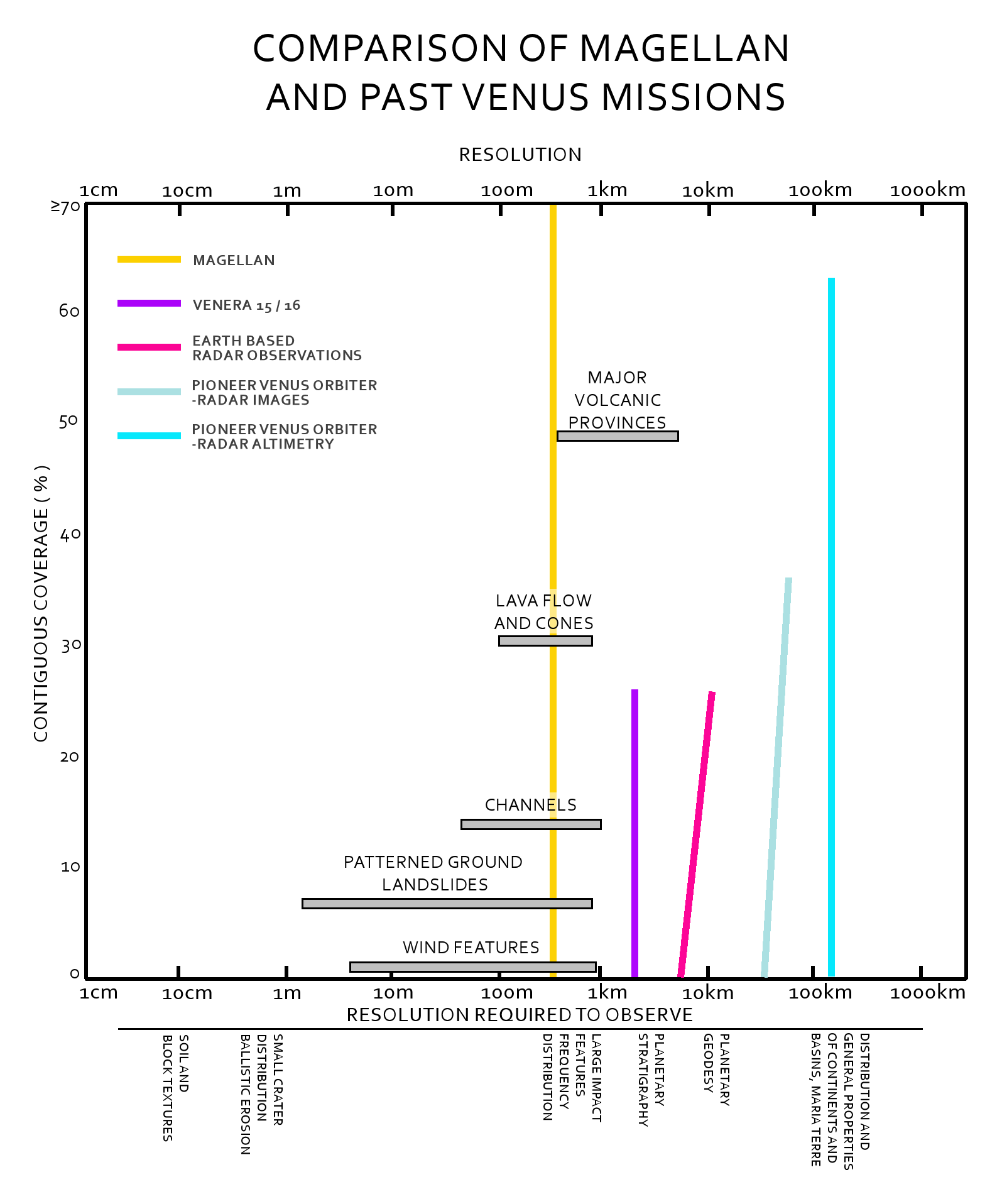
Comparison to previous missions

RDRS was a much more capable instrument compared to previous missions

Thick and opaque, the atmosphere of Venus required a method beyond optical survey, to map the surface of the planet. The resolution of conventional radar depends entirely on the size of the antenna, which is greatly restricted by costs, physical constraints by launch vehicles and the complexity of maneuvering a large apparatus to provide high resolution data. Magellan addressed this problem by using a method known as synthetic aperture, where a large antenna is imitated by processing the information gathered by ground computers.

The Magellan high-gain parabolic antenna, oriented 28°–78° to the right or left of nadir, emitted thousands of microwave pulses per second that passed through the clouds and to the surface of Venus, illuminating a swath of land. The Radar System then recorded the brightness of each pulse as it reflected back off the side surfaces of rocks, cliffs, volcanoes and other geologic features, as a form of backscatter. To increase the imaging resolution, Magellan recorded a series of data bursts for a particular location during multiple instances called, "looks". Each "look" slightly overlapped the previous, returning slightly different information for the same location, as the spacecraft moved in orbit. After transmitting the data back to Earth, Doppler modeling was used to take the overlapping "looks" and combine them into a continuous, high resolution image of the surface.

==== Radar System (RDRS) ====
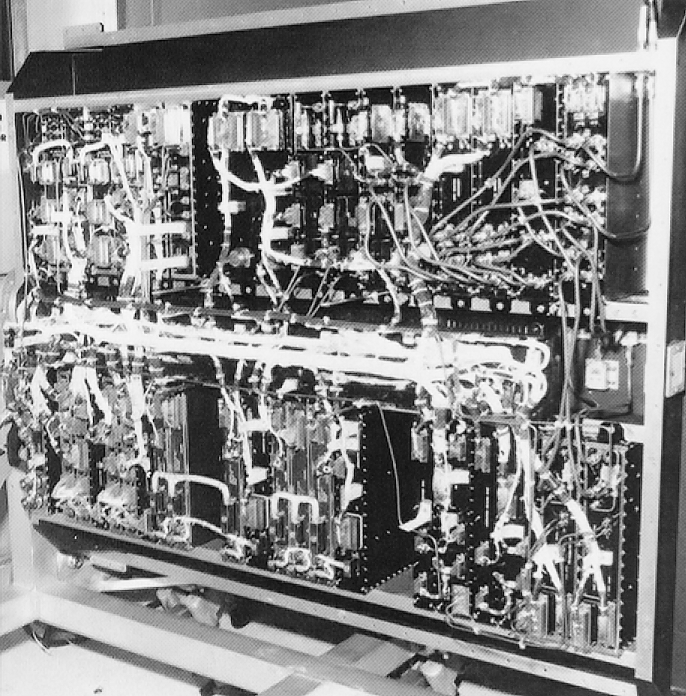

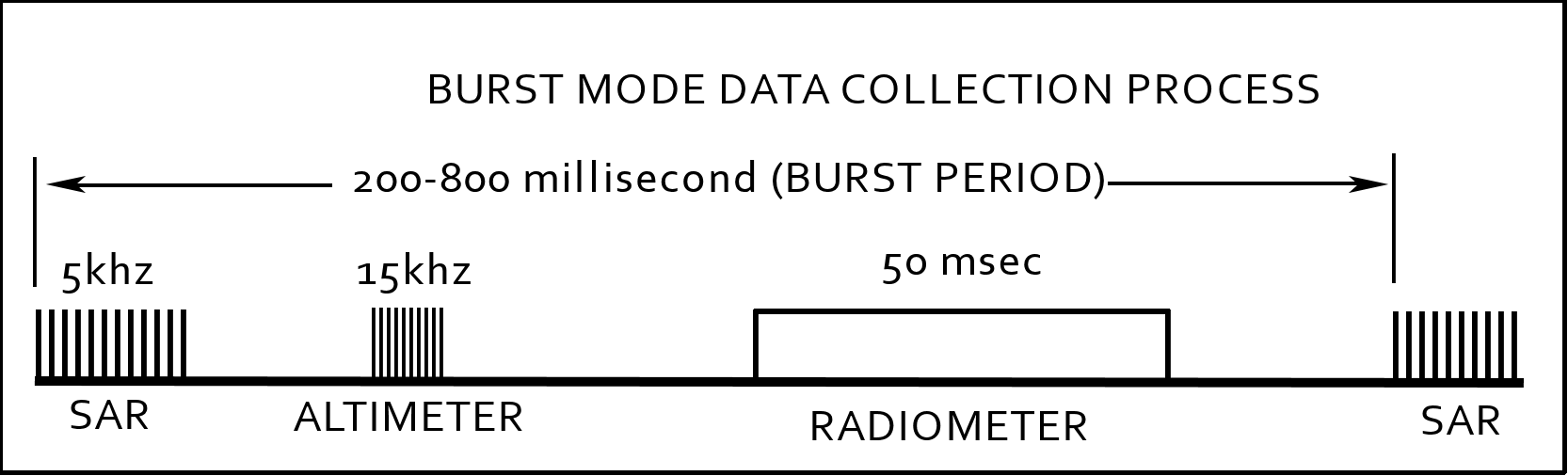

The Radar System (RDRS) functioned in three modes: synthetic aperture radar (SAR), altimetry (ALT), and radiometry (RAD). The instrument cycled through the three modes while observing the surface geology, topography, and temperature of Venus using the 3.7-meter parabolic, high-gain antenna and a small fan-beam antenna, located just to the side.

– In the Synthetic Aperture Radar mode, the instrument transmitted several thousand long-wave, 12.6-centimeter microwave pulses every second through the high-gain antenna, while measuring the doppler shift of each hitting the surface. – In Altimetry mode, the instrument interleaved pulses with SAR, and operating similarly with the altimetric antenna, recording information regarding the elevation of the surface on Venus. – In Radiometry mode, the high-gain antenna was used to record microwave radiothermal emissions from Venus. This data was used to characterize the surface temperature.

The data was collected at 750 kilobits/second to the tape recorder and later transmitted to Earth (10 Bit per second * 365 *4 * 24 * 60 = 21 Mbit (maximum) = 85 Foto (maximum) ) to be processed into usable images, by the Radar Data Processing Subsystem (RDPS), a collection of ground computers operated by JPL. The principal investigator for this instrument was Gordon Pettengill from MIT.

=== Experiments ===
Magellan returned data to perform three so called experiments:

- Synthetic Aperture Radar (SAR), already covered above while discussion the RDRS instrument;
- Gravimetry, consisting on detailed measurements of the Venus gravitational field, with the principal investigator being Georges Balmino from Centre National d'Etudes Spatiales;
- Magellan Radio Science Occultation Experiment (ROCC), consisting on measurements of the atmospheric density and radio occultation data on the atmospheric profile. The principal investigator was Jon M. Jenkins from NASA Ames Research Center.

=== Gallery ===
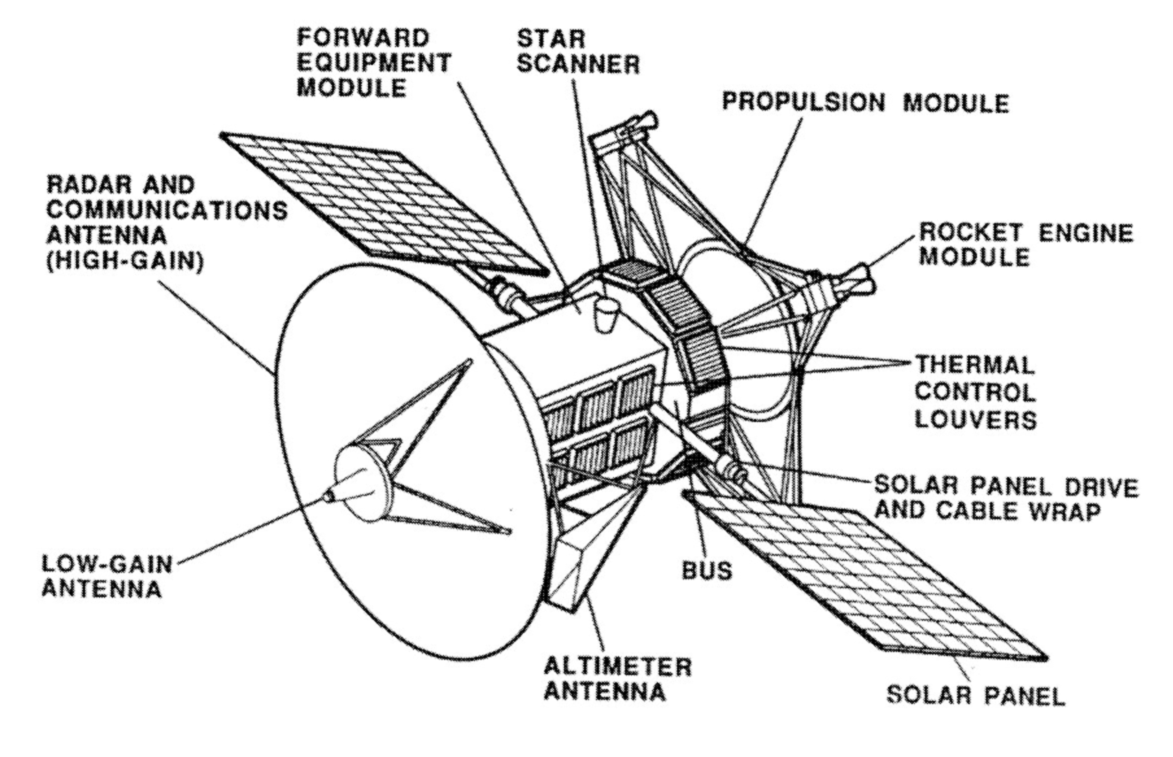
Annotated diagram of Magellan

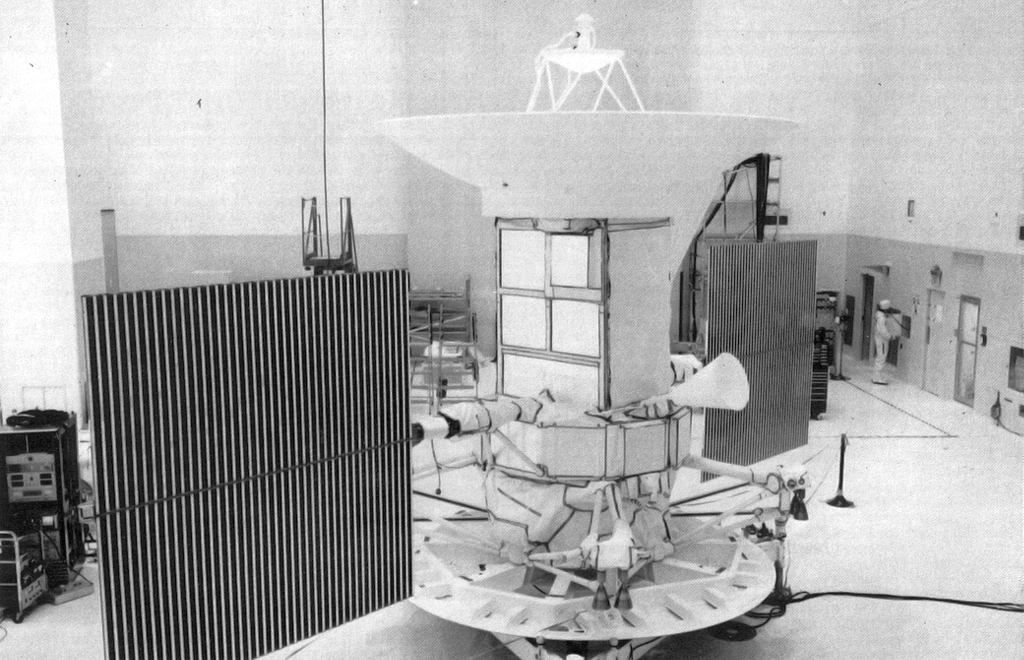
Magellan during pre-flight checkout

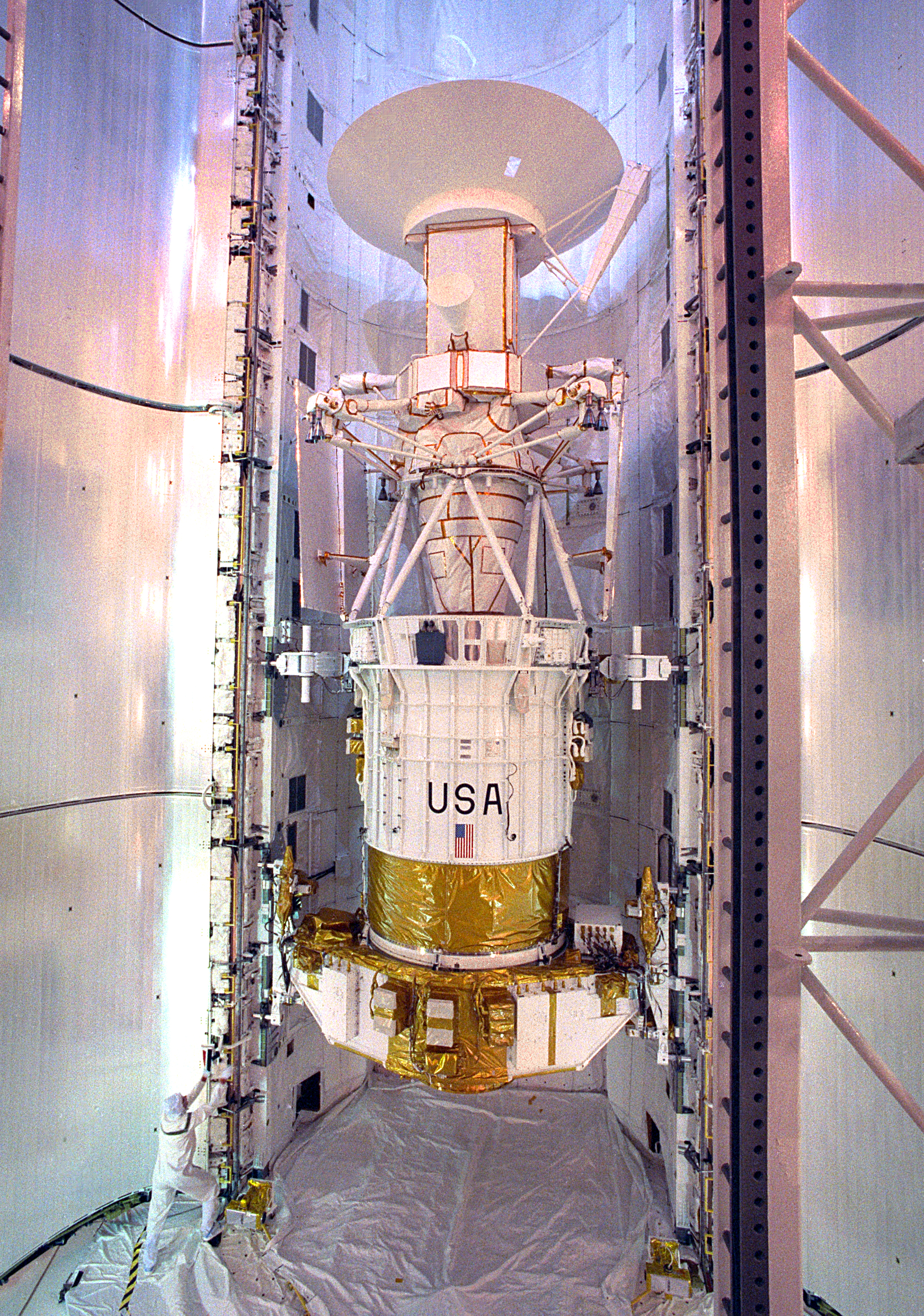
Magellan being fixed into position inside the payload bay of Atlantis prior to launch

== Mission profile ==
Date	Event
1989-05-04	Space Shuttle vehicle launched at 18:46:59 UTC.
1989-05-05	Spacecraft deployed from Atlantis at 01:06:00 UTC.
1990-08-10	Begin Venus primary mission operations
1990-08-10	Venus orbital insertion maneuver
1990-09-15	Begin mapping cycle 1
1991-05-15	Phase stop
1991-05-16	Begin Venus extended mission operations
1991-05-16	Begin mapping cycle 2
1992-01-24	Begin mapping cycle 3
1992-09-14	Begin mapping cycle 4
1993-05-26	Begin testing aerobraking maneuver to place Magellan into an almost circular orbit.
1993-08-16	Begin mapping cycle 5
1994-04-16	Begin mapping cycle 6
1994-04-16	Begin "Windmill" experiment
1994-10-12	Phase stop
1994-10-13	End of mission. Deorbited into Venusian atmosphere. Loss of contact at 10:05:00 UTC.

=== Launch and trajectory ===
Magellan was launched on May 4, 1989, at 18:46:59 UTC by the National Aeronautics and Space Administration from KSC Launch Complex 39B at the Kennedy Space Center in Florida, aboard Space Shuttle Atlantis during mission STS-30. Once in orbit, the Magellan and its attached Inertial Upper Stage booster were deployed from Atlantis and launched on May 5, 1989 01:06:00 UTC, sending the spacecraft into a Type IV heliocentric orbit where it would circle the Sun 1.5 times, before reaching Venus 15 months later on August 10, 1990.

Originally, the Magellan had been scheduled for launch in 1988 with a trajectory lasting six months. However, due to the Space Shuttle Challenger disaster in 1986, several missions, including Galileo and Magellan, were deferred until shuttle flights resumed in September 1988. Magellan was planned to be launched with a liquid-fueled, Centaur G upper-stage booster, carried in the cargo bay of the Space Shuttle. However, the entire Centaur G program was canceled after the Challenger disaster, and the Magellan probe had to be modified to be attached to the less-powerful Inertial Upper Stage. The next best opportunity for launching occurred in October 1989.

Further complicating the launch however, was the launching of the Galileo mission to Jupiter, one that included a fly-by of Venus. Intended for launch in 1986, the pressures to ensure a launch for Galileo in 1989, mixed with a short launch-window necessitating a mid-October launch, resulted in replanning the Magellan mission. Wary of rapid shuttle launches, the decision was made to launch Magellan in May, and into an orbit that would require one year, three months, before encountering Venus.

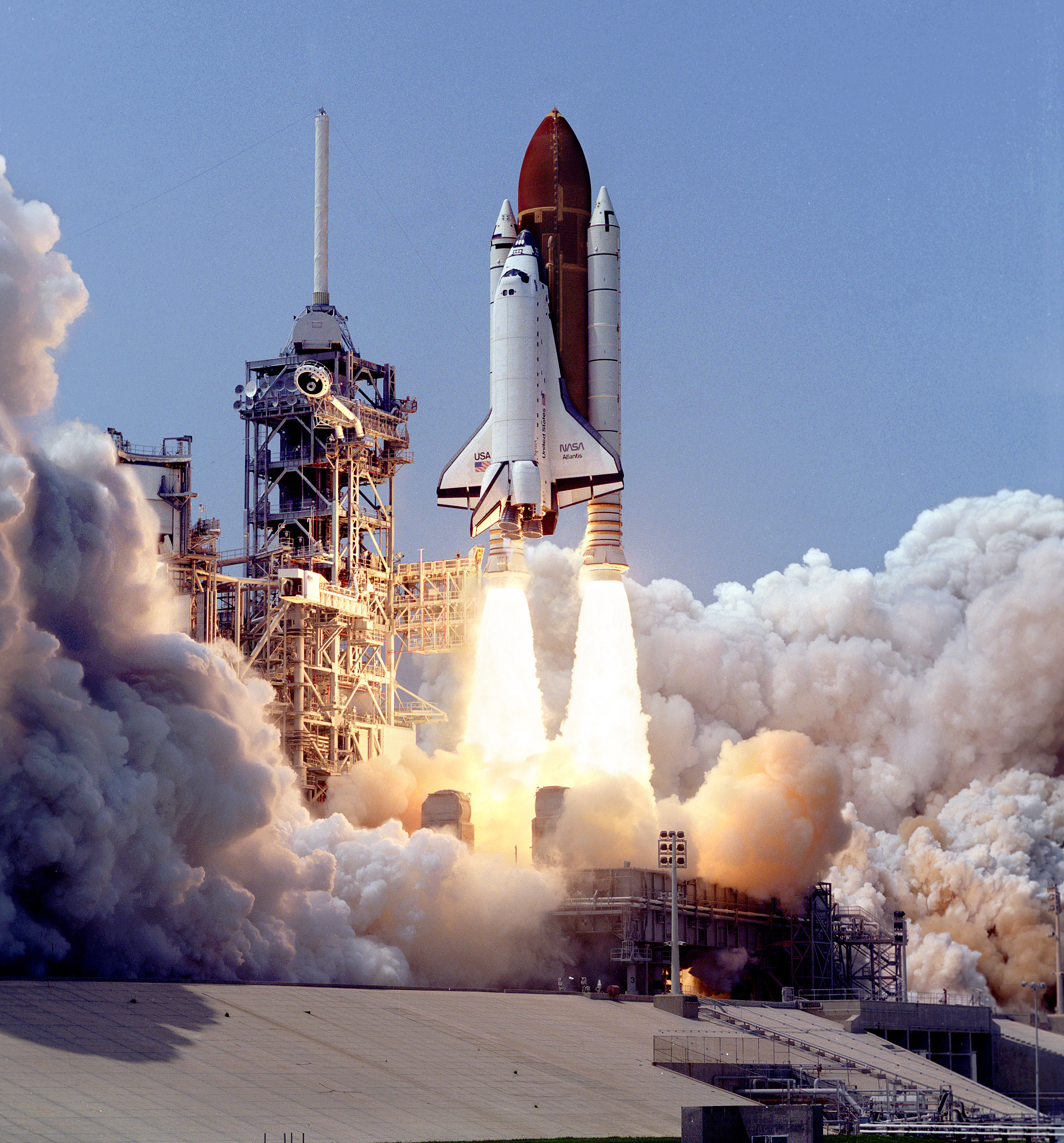
Launch of STS-30 on May 4, 1989

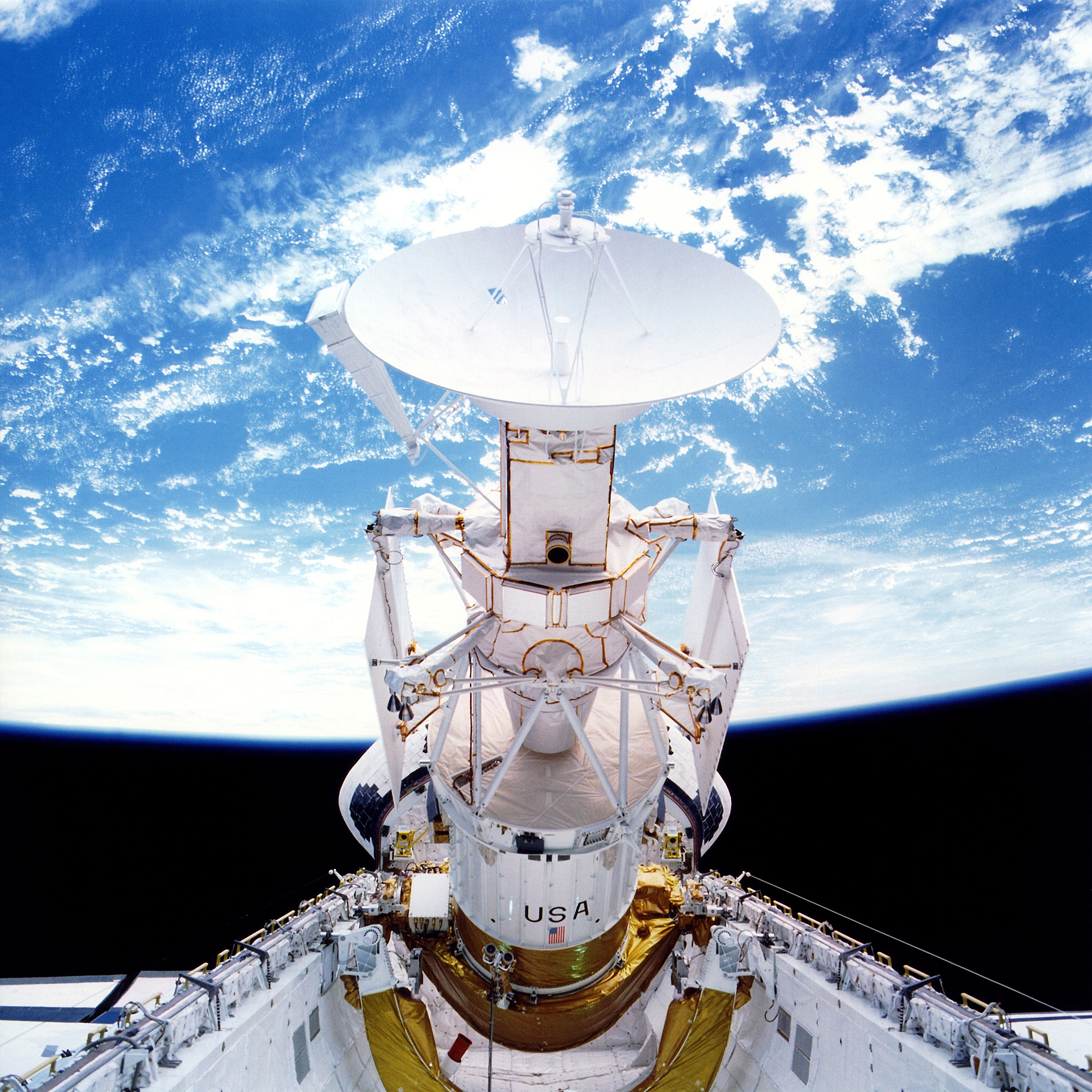
The spacecraft in a deployment position in Atlantis' payload bay

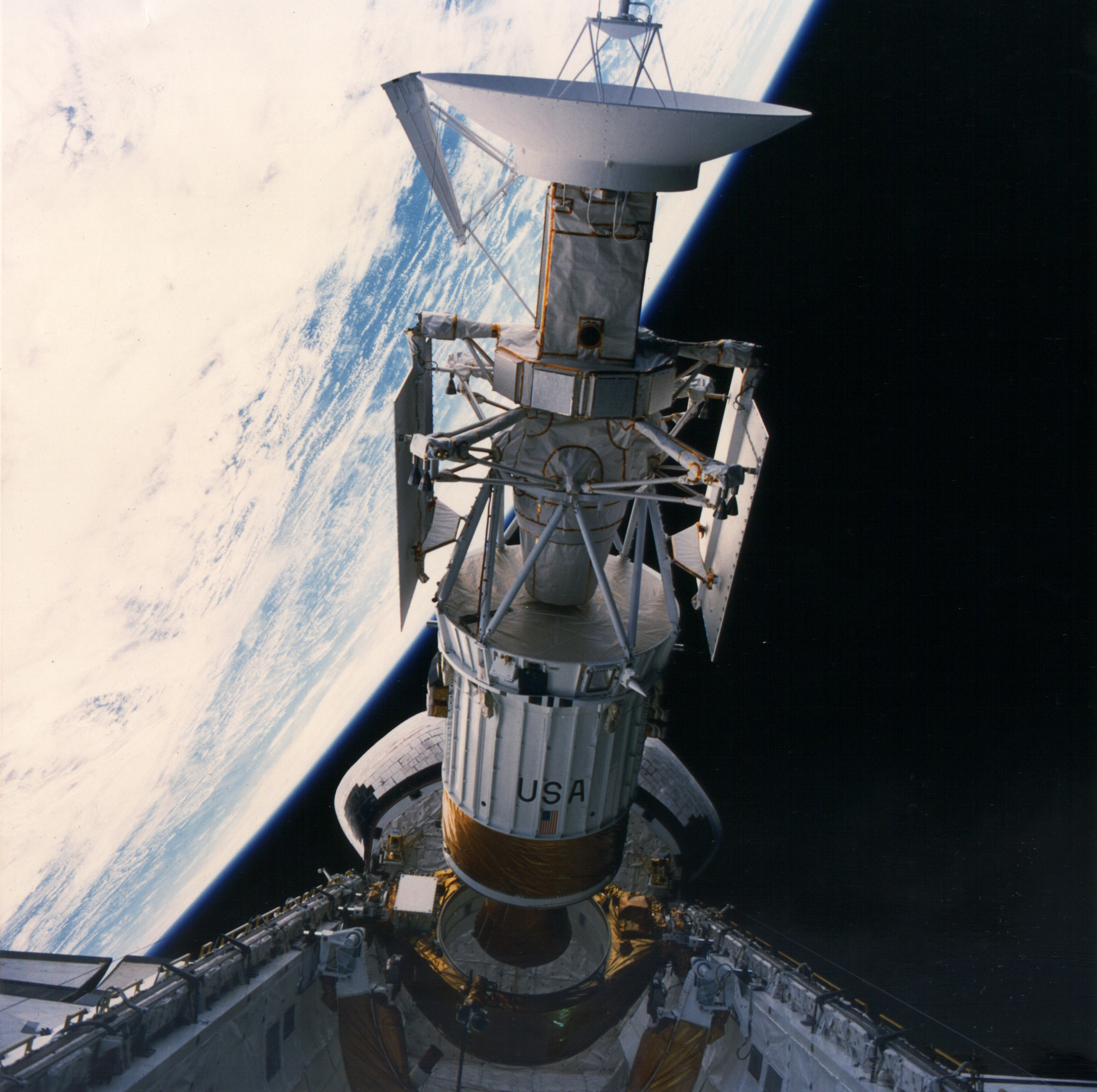
Deployment of Magellan with Inertial Upper Stage booster

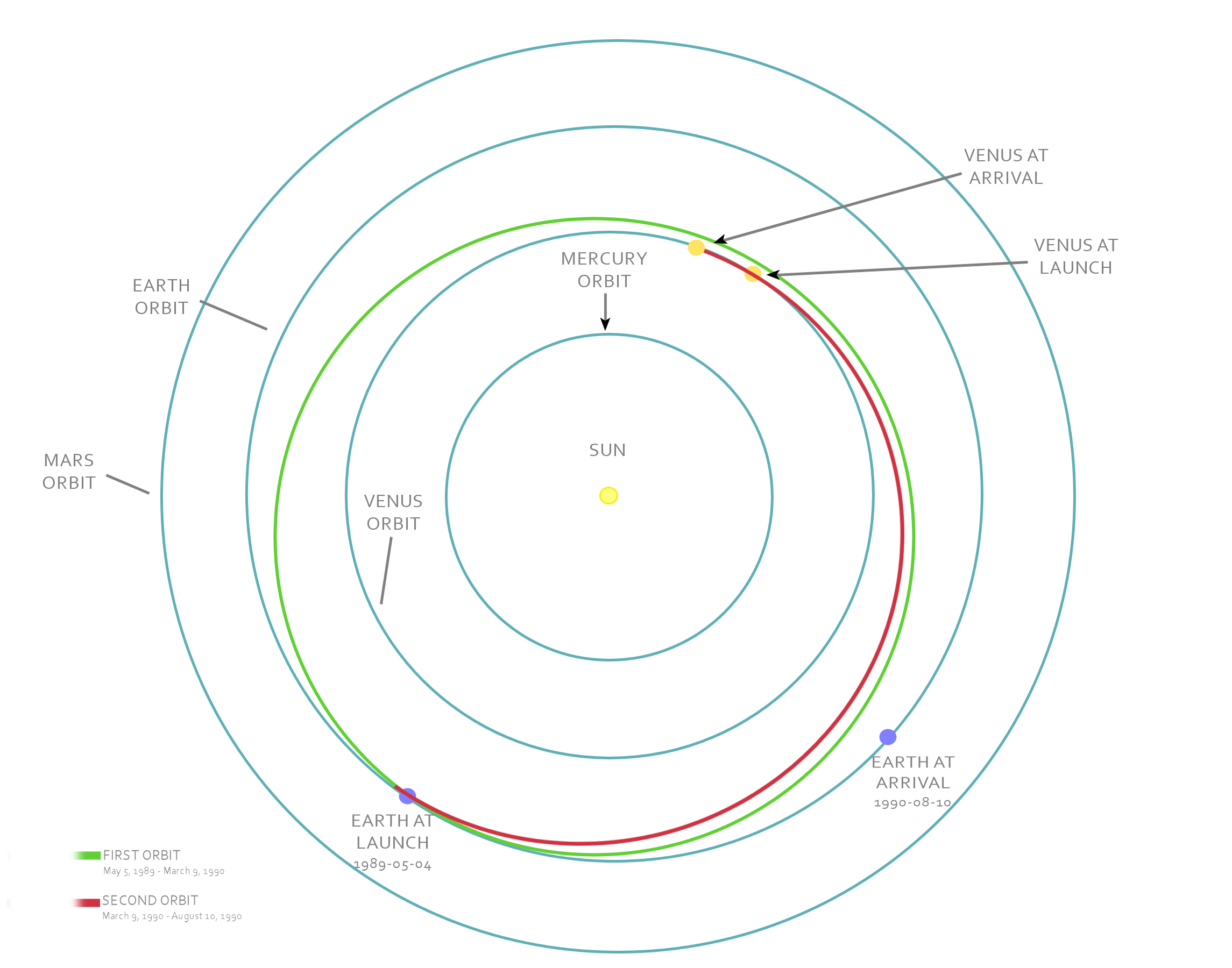
Trajectory of Magellan to Venus

=== Orbital encounter of Venus ===
Magellan to Venus

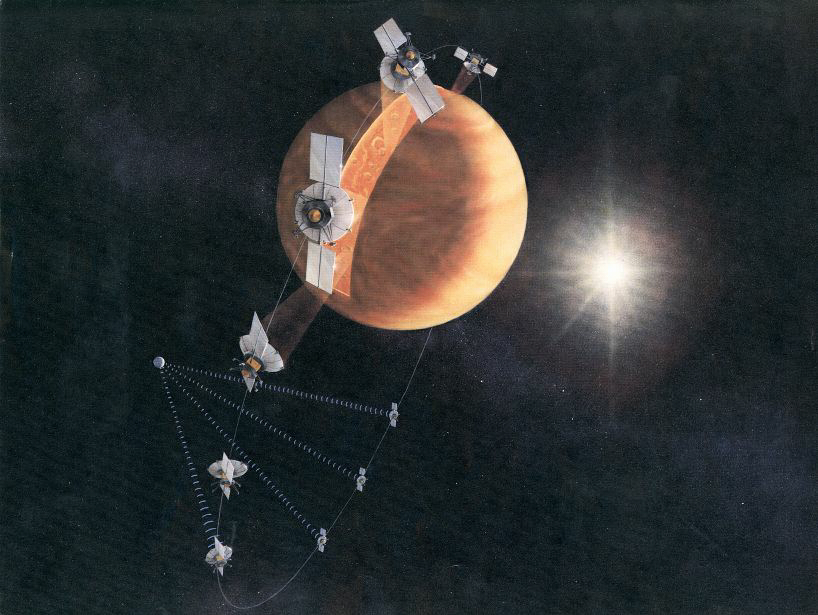
Artistic depiction of the orbiter cycle

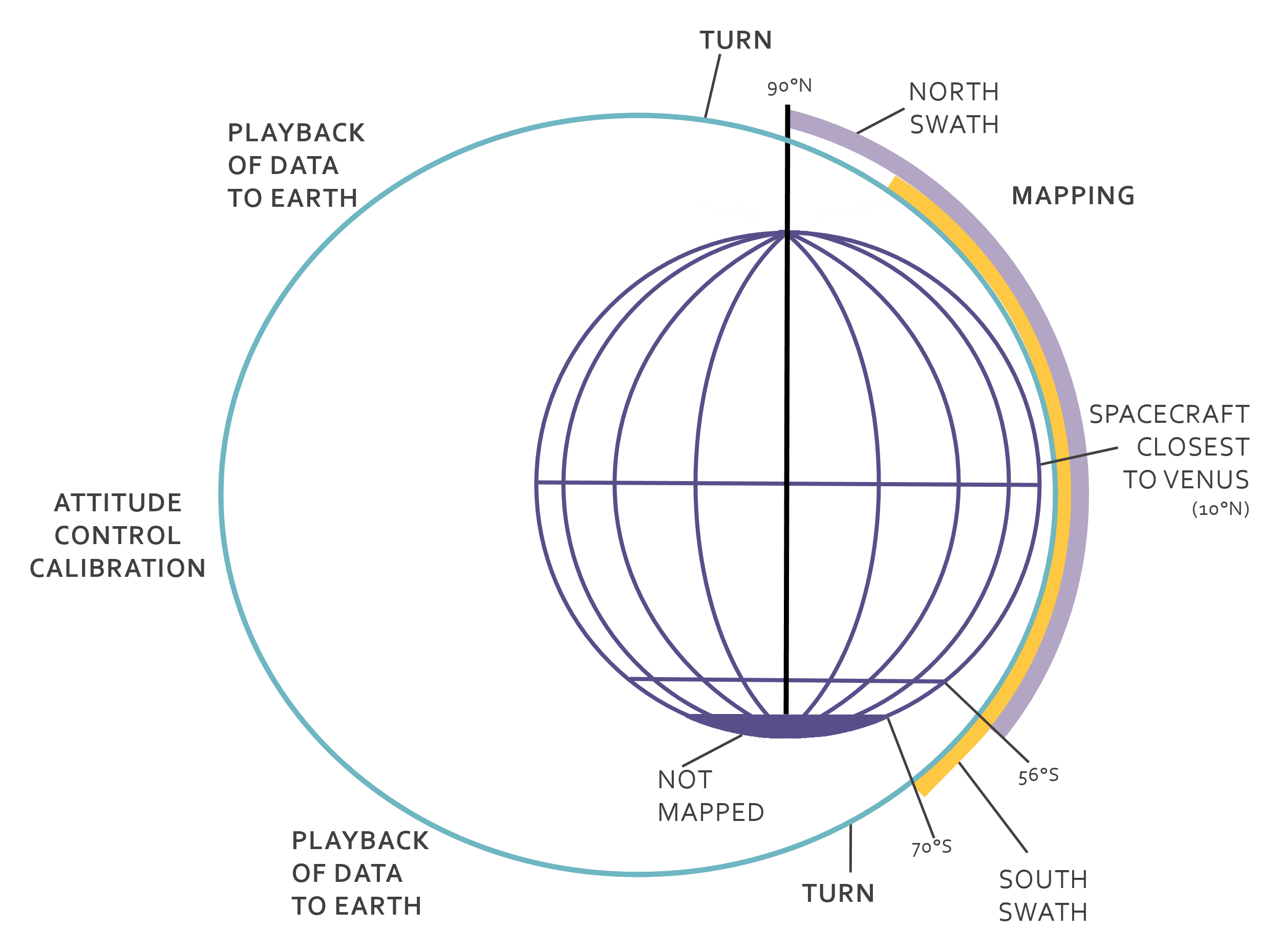
Diagram of the mapping cycle

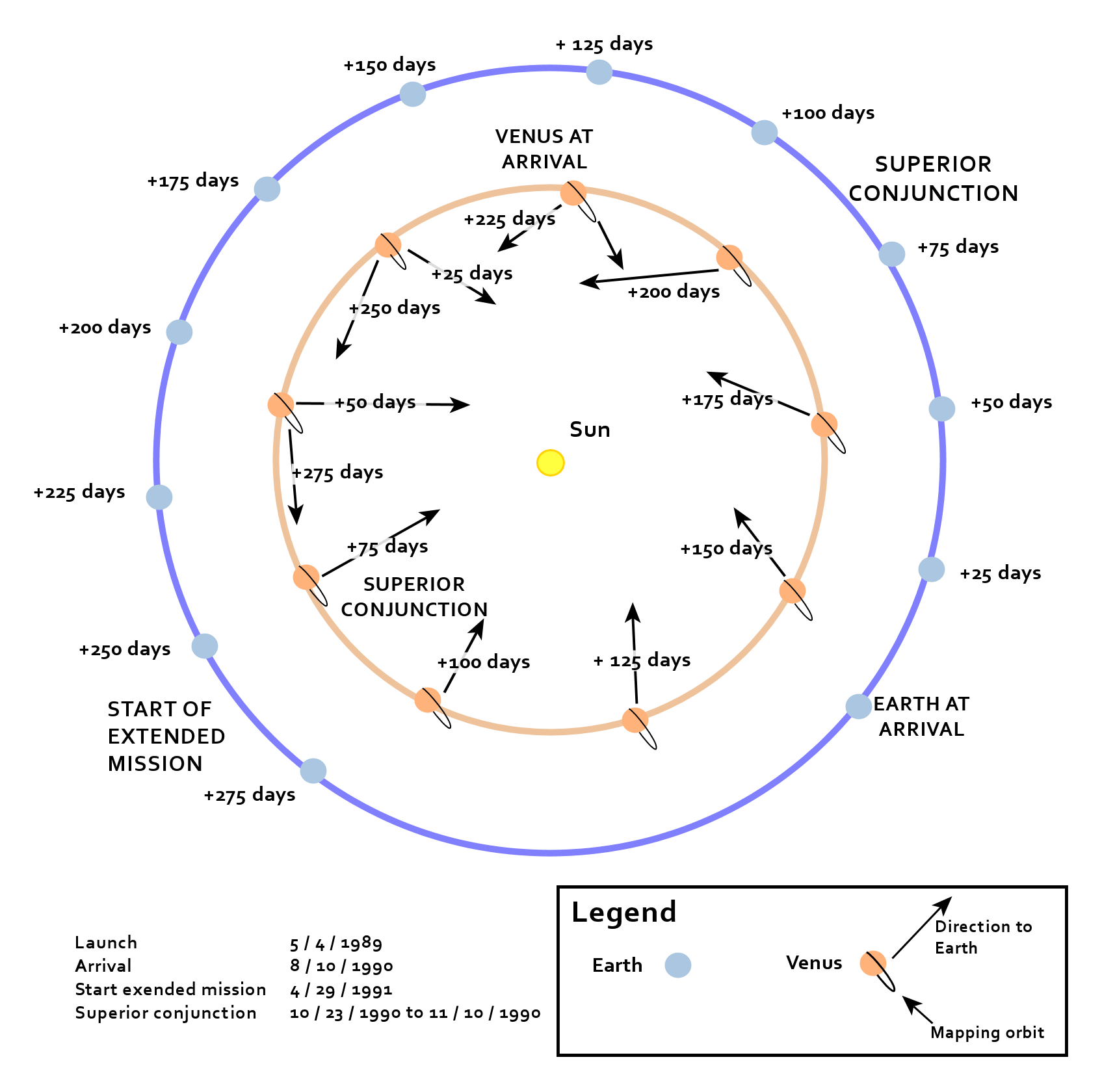
Mapping cycles

The highly elliptical orbit of Magellan allowed the high-gain antenna to be used for radar data and communicating with Earth

On August 10, 1990, Magellan encountered Venus and began the orbital insertion maneuver which placed the spacecraft into a three-hour, nine minute, elliptical orbit that brought the spacecraft 295-kilometers from the surface at about 10 degrees North during the periapsis and out to 7762-kilometers during apoapsis.

During each orbit, the space probe captured radar data while the spacecraft was closest to the surface, and then transmitted it back to Earth as it moved away from Venus. This maneuver required extensive use of the reaction wheels to rotate the spacecraft as it imaged the surface for 37-minutes and as it pointed toward Earth for two hours. The primary mission intended for the spacecraft to return images of at least 70 percent of the surface during one Venusian day, which lasts 243 Earth days as the planet slowly spins. To avoid overly-redundant data at the highest and lowest latitudes, the Magellan probe alternated between a Northern-swath, a region designated as 90 degrees north latitude to 54 degrees south latitude, and a Southern-swath, designated as 76 degrees north latitude to 68 degrees south latitude. However, due to periapsis being 10 degrees north of the equatorial line, imaging the South Pole region was unlikely.

==== Mapping cycle 1 ====
- Goal: Complete primary objective.
- September 15, 1990 – May 15, 1991

The primary mission began on September 15, 1990, with the intention to provide a "left-looking" map of 70% of the Venusian surface at a minimum resolution of 1-kilometer/pixel. During cycle 1, the altitude of the spacecraft varied from 2000-kilometers at the north pole, to 290-kilometers near periapsis. Upon completion during May 15, 1991, having made 1,792 orbits, Magellan had mapped approximately 83.7% of the surface with a resolution between 101 and 250-meters/pixel.

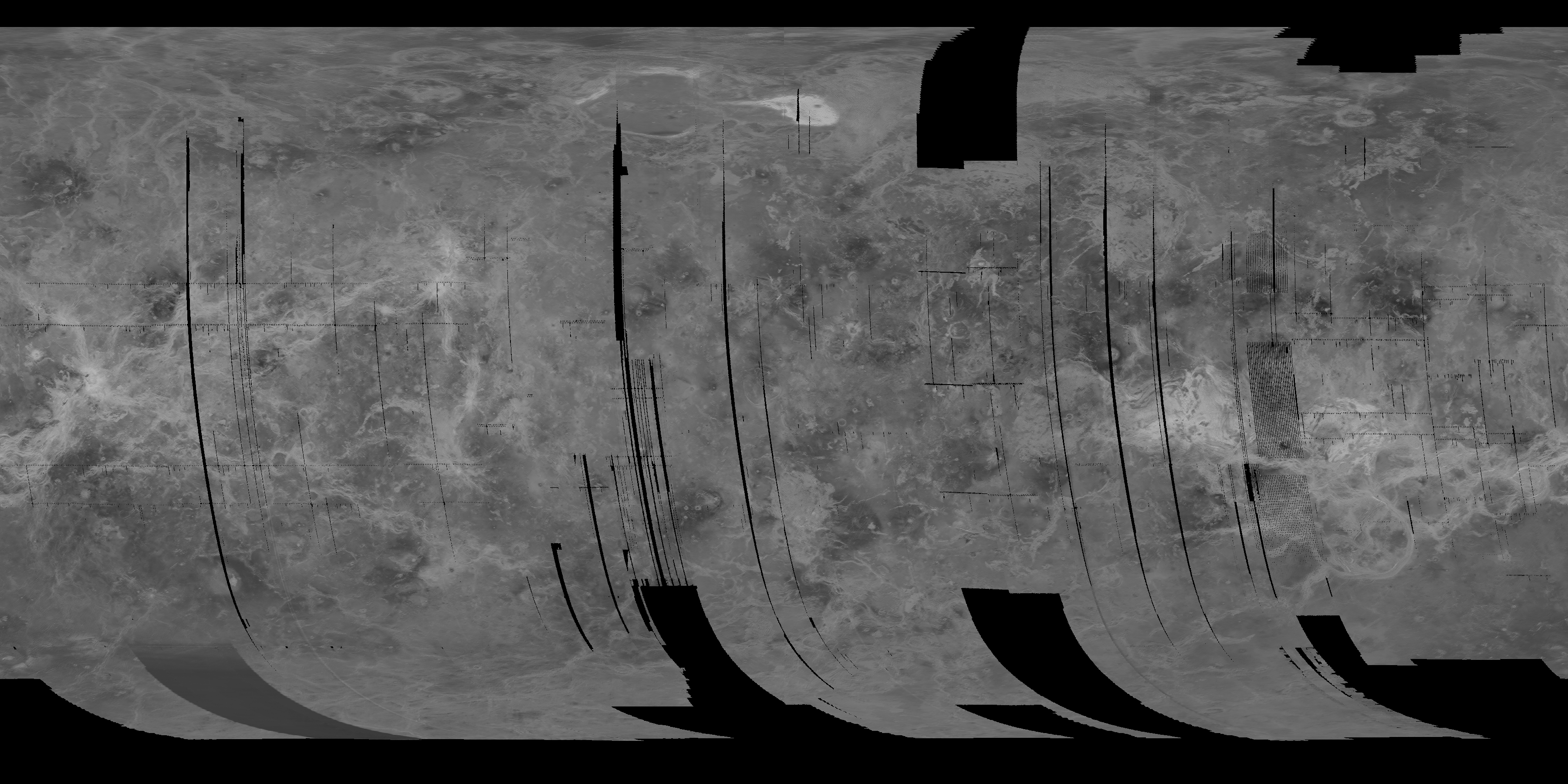
Mosaic of the "left-looking" data collected during cycle 1

=== Mission extension ===
==== Mapping cycle 2 ====
- Goal: Image the south pole region and gaps from Cycle 1.
- May 15, 1991 – January 14, 1992

Beginning immediately after the end of cycle 1, cycle 2 was intended to provide data for the existing gaps in the map collected during first cycle, including a large portion of the southern hemisphere. To do this, Magellan had to be reoriented, changing the gathering method to "right-looking". Upon completion during mid-January 1992, cycle 2 provided data for 54.5% of the surface, and combined with the previous cycle, a map containing 96% of the surface could be constructed.

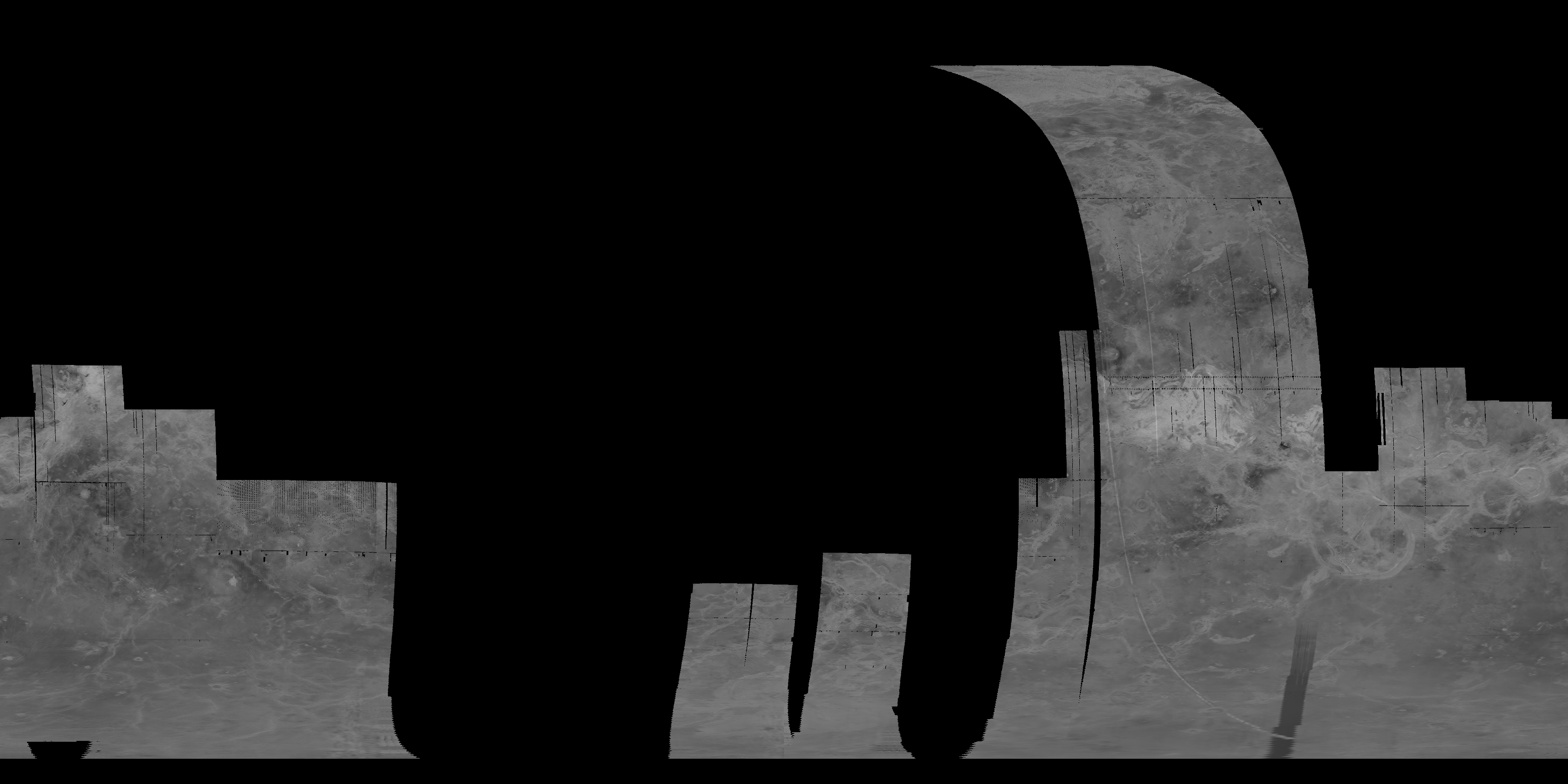
Mosaic of the "right-looking" data collected during cycle 2

==== Mapping cycle 3 ====
- Goal: Fill remaining gaps and collect stereo imagery.
- January 15, 1992 – September 13, 1992

Immediately after cycle 2, cycle 3 began collecting data for stereo imagery on the surface that would later allow the ground team to construct, clear, three-dimensional renderings of the surface. Approximately 21.3% of the surface was imaged in stereo by the end of the cycle on September 13, 1992, increasing the overall coverage of the surface to 98%.

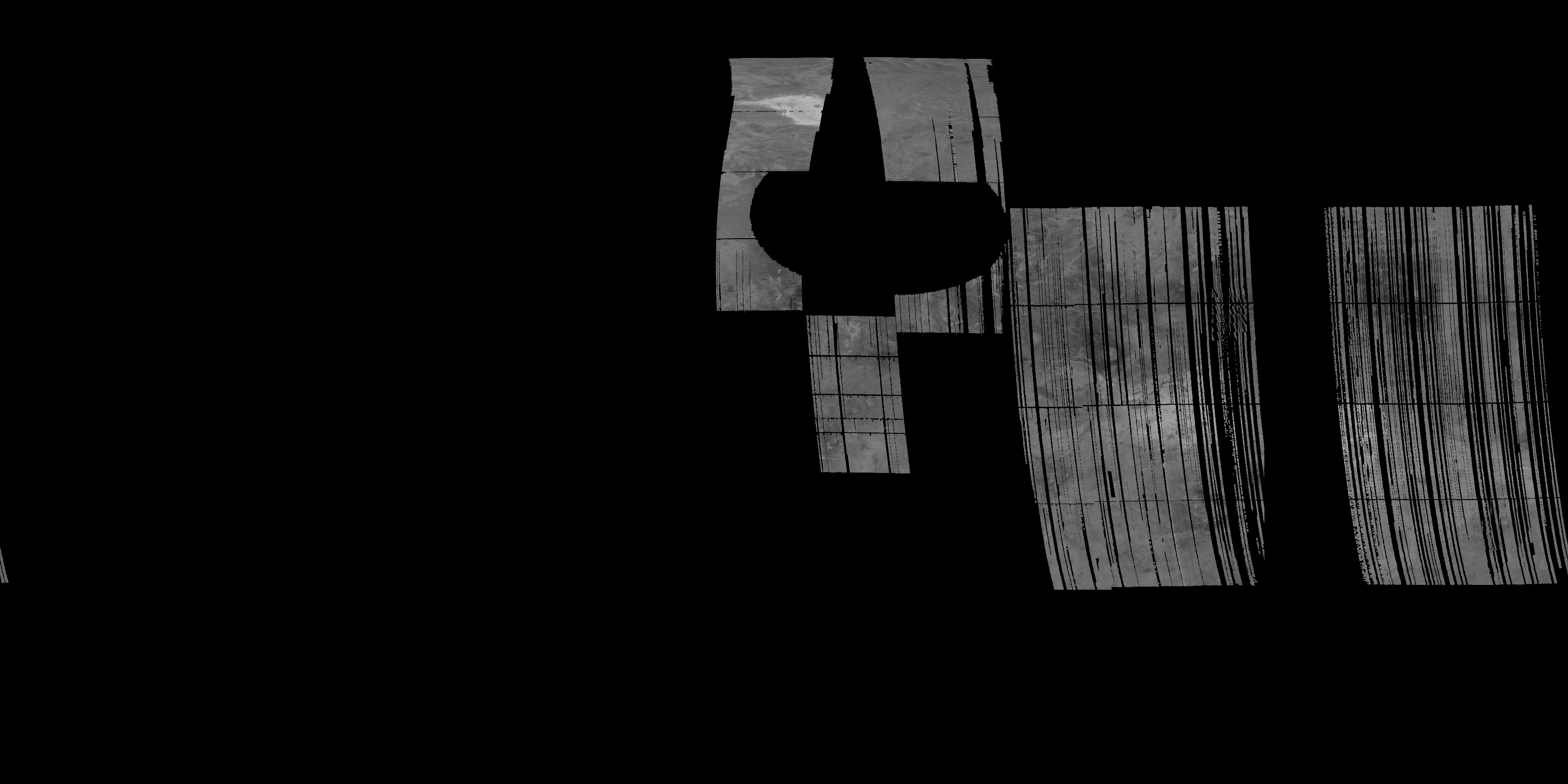
Map of the stereo imaging collected by Magellan during cycle 3

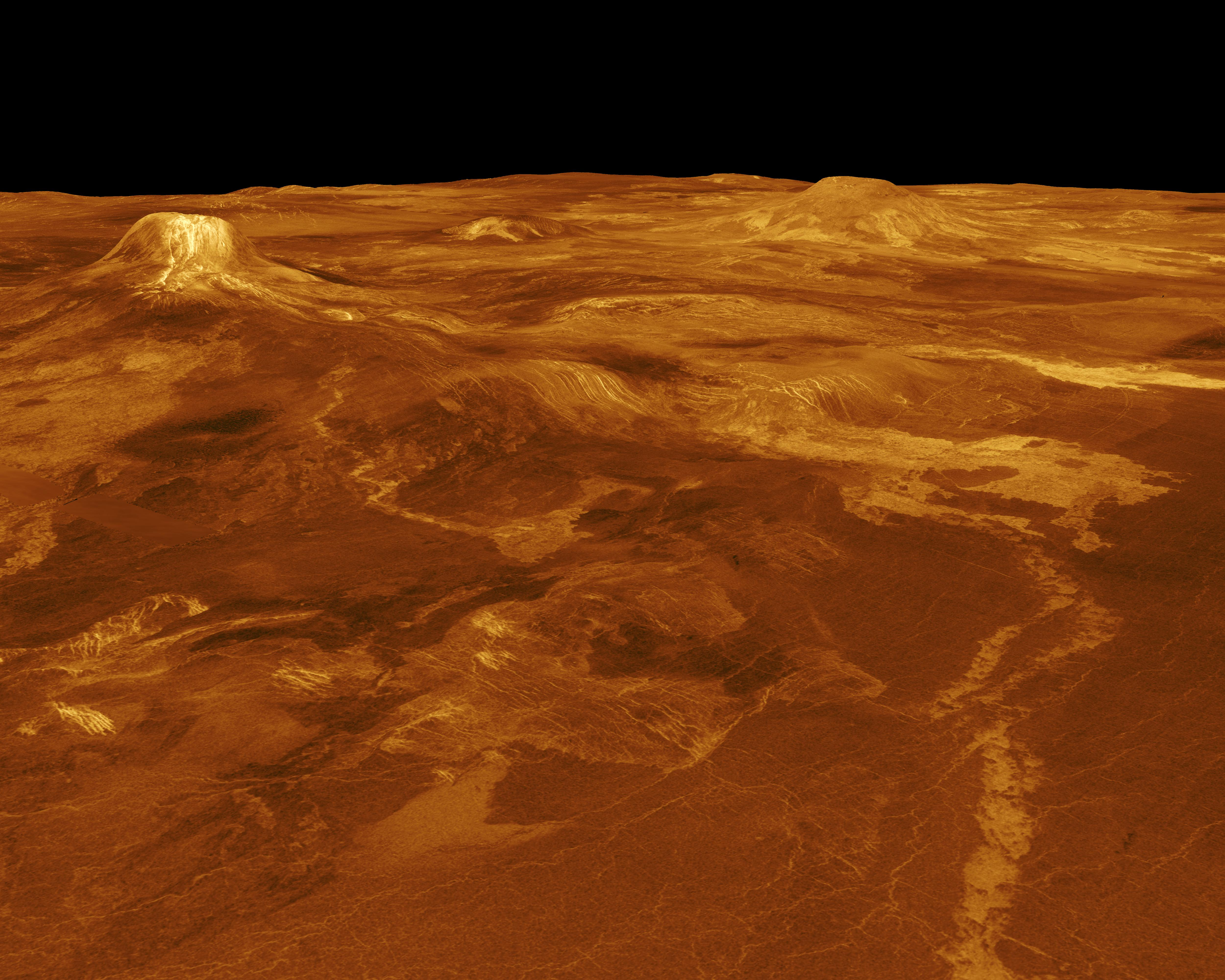
Eistla Regio featuring Gula Mons reprojected in 3D from stereo data

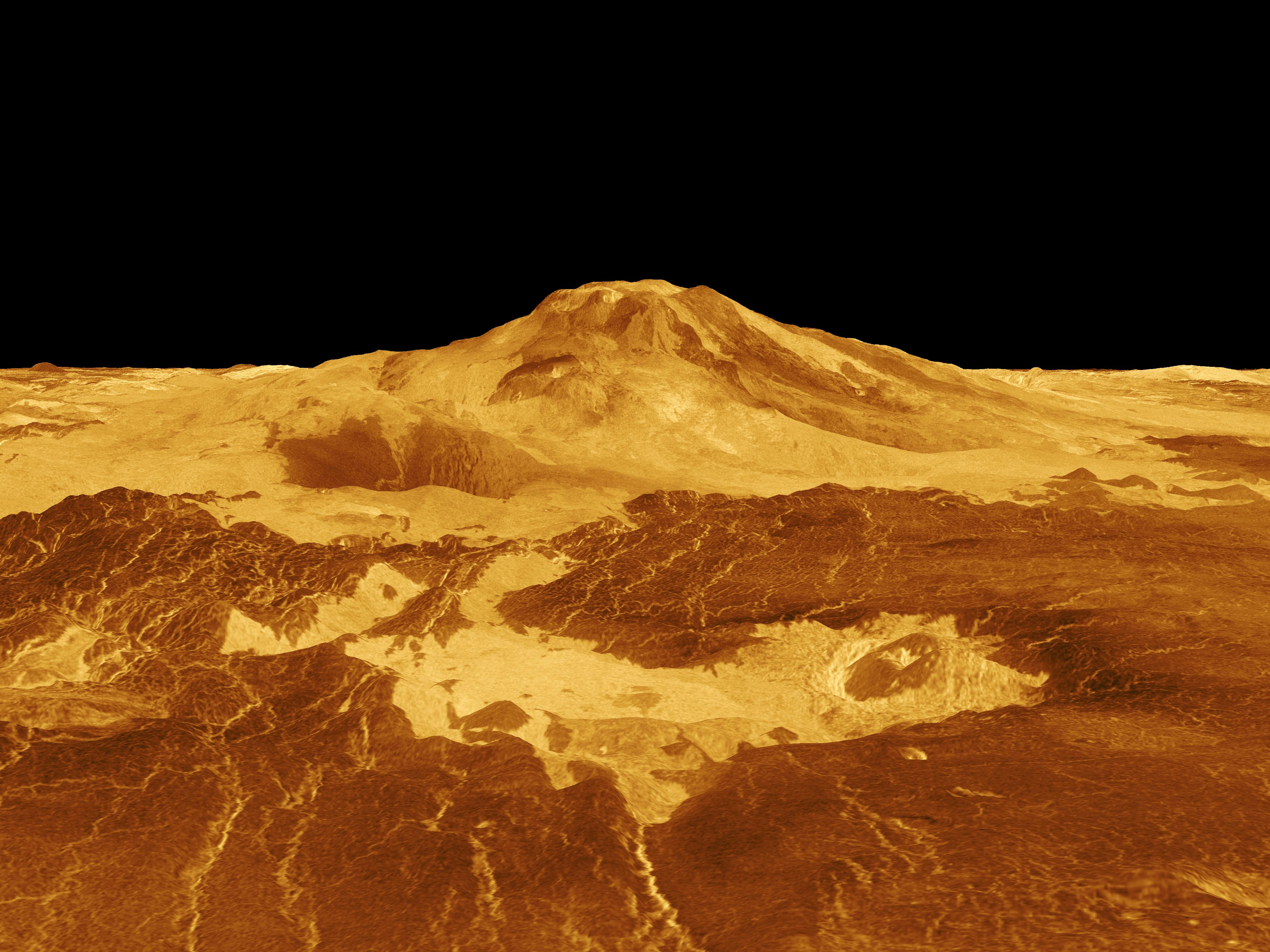
Reprojection of Maat Mons, with vertical exaggeration

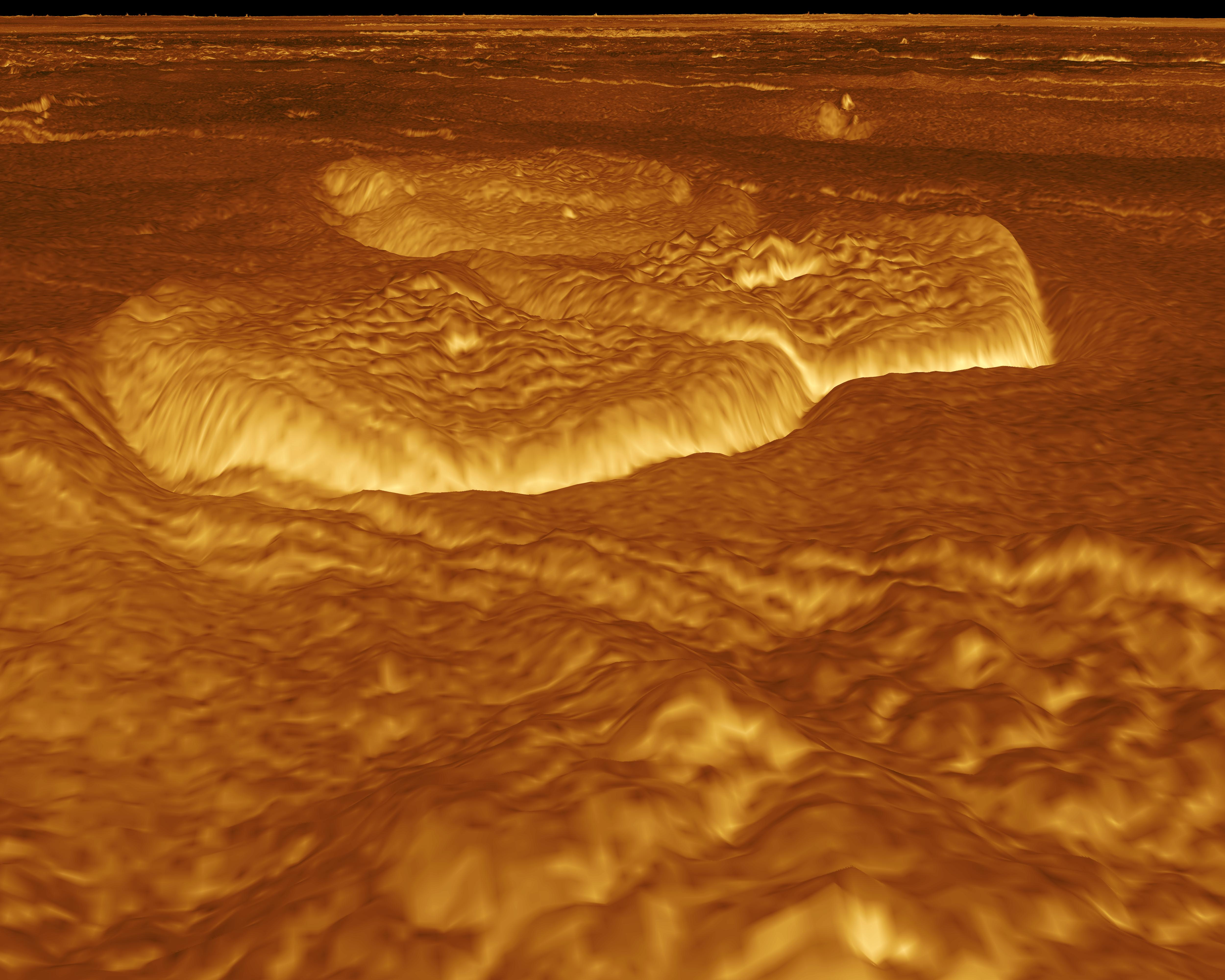
Volcanic dome in Alpha Regio observed from reprojecting stereo data

==== Mapping cycle 4 ====
- Goal: Measure Venus' gravitational field.
- September 14, 1992 – May 23, 1993

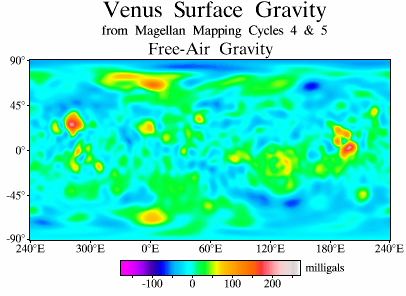
A map of the gravity anomaly constructed from data received during cycles 4 and 5.

Upon completing cycle 3, Magellan ceased imaging the surface. Instead, beginning mid-September 1992, the Magellan maintained pointing of the high-gain antenna toward Earth where the Deep Space Network began recording a constant stream of telemetry. This constant signal allowed the DSN to collect information on the gravitational field of Venus by monitoring the velocity of the spacecraft. Areas of higher gravitation would slightly increase the velocity of the spacecraft, registering as a Doppler shift in the signal. The space craft completed 1,878 orbits until completion of the cycle on May 23, 1993; a loss of data at the beginning of the cycle necessitated an additional 10 days of gravitational study.

==== Mapping cycle 5 ====
- Goal: Aerobraking to circular orbit and global gravity measurements.
- May 24, 1993 – August 29, 1994

At the end of the fourth cycle in May 1993, the orbit of Magellan was circularized using a technique known as aerobraking. The circularized orbit allowed a much higher resolution of gravimetric data to be acquired when cycle 5 began on August 3, 1993. The spacecraft performed 2,855 orbits and provided high-resolution gravimetric data for 94% of the planet, before the end of the cycle on August 29, 1994.

===== Aerobraking =====
- Goal: To enter a circular orbit
- May 24, 1993 – August 2, 1993

Aerobraking had long been sought as a method for slowing the orbit of interplanetary spacecraft. Previous suggestions included the need for aeroshells that proved too complicated and expensive for most missions. Testing a new approach to the method, a plan was devised to drop the orbit of Magellan into the outermost region of the Venusian atmosphere. Slight friction on the spacecraft slowed the velocity over a period, slightly longer than two months, bringing the spacecraft into an approximately circular orbit with periapse altitude at 180 km and apoapse altitude at 540 km, down from an apoapse altitude at 8467 km. The method has since been used extensively on later interplanetary missions.

==== Mapping cycle 6 ====
- Goal: Collect high-resolution gravity data and conduct radio science experiments.
- April 16, 1994 – October 13, 1994

The sixth and final orbiting cycle was another extension to the two previous gravimetric studies. Toward the end of the cycle, a final experiment was conducted, known as the "Windmill" experiment to provide data on the composition of the upper atmosphere of Venus. Magellan performed 1,783 orbits before the end of the cycle on October 13, 1994, when the spacecraft entered the atmosphere and disintegrated.

===== Windmill experiment =====
- Goal: Collect data on atmospheric dynamics.
- September 6, 1994 – September 14, 1994

In September 1994, the orbit of Magellan was lowered to begin the "Windmill experiment". During the experiment, the spacecraft was oriented with the solar arrays broadly perpendicular to the orbital path, where they could act as paddles as they impacted molecules of the upper-Venusian atmosphere. Countering this force, the thrusters fired to keep the spacecraft from spinning. This provided data on the basic oxygen gas-surface interaction. This was useful for understanding the impact of upper-atmospheric forces which aided in designing future Earth-orbiting satellites, and methods for aerobraking during future planetary spacecraft missions.

=== Results ===
Rendered animation of Venus rotating using data gathered by Magellan

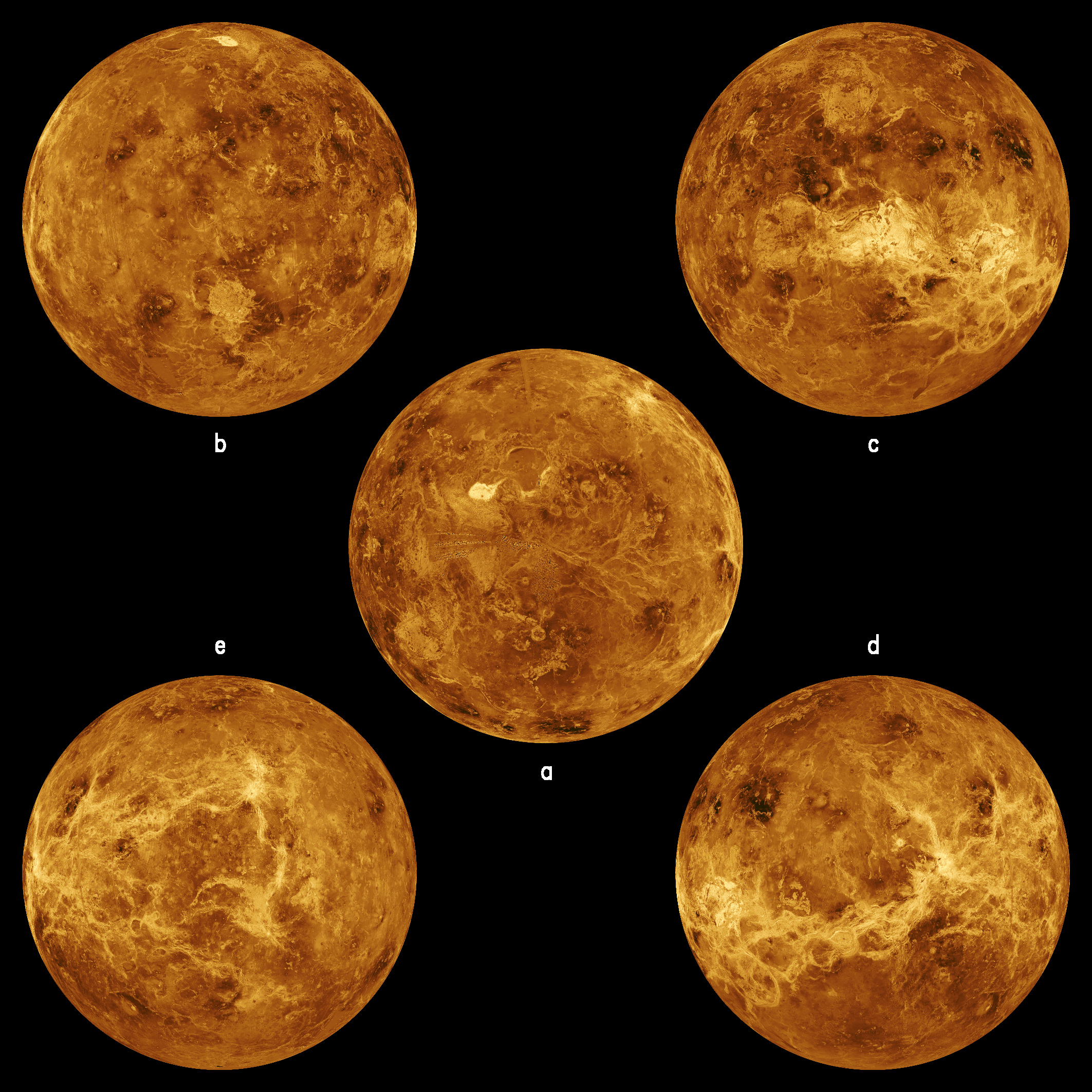
Five global views of Venus by Magellan

- Study of the Magellan high-resolution global images is providing evidence to better understand Venusian geology and the role of impacts, volcanism, and tectonics in the formation of Venusian surface structures.
- The surface of Venus is mostly covered by volcanic materials. Volcanic surface features, such as vast lava plains, fields of small lava domes, and large shield volcanoes are common.
- There are few impact craters on Venus, suggesting that the surface is, in general, geologically young – less than 800 million years old.
- The presence of lava channels over 6,000 kilometers long suggests river-like flows of extremely low-viscosity lava that probably erupted at a high rate.
- Large pancake-shaped volcanic domes suggest the presence of a type of lava produced by extensive evolution of crustal rocks.
- The typical signs of terrestrial plate tectonics - continental drift and basin floor spreading - are not evident on Venus. The planet's tectonics is dominated by a system of global rift zones and numerous broad, low domical structures called coronae, produced by the upwelling and subsidence of magma from the mantle.
- Although Venus has a dense atmosphere, the surface reveals no evidence of substantial wind erosion, and only evidence of limited wind transport of dust and sand. This contrasts with Mars, where there is a thin atmosphere, but substantial evidence of wind erosion and transport of dust and sand.

Magellan created the first (and currently the best) near-photographic quality, high resolution radar mapping of the planet's surface features. Prior Venus missions had created low resolution radar globes of general, continent-sized formations. Magellan, however, finally allowed detailed imaging and analysis of craters, hills, ridges, and other geologic formations, to a degree comparable to the visible-light photographic mapping of other planets.

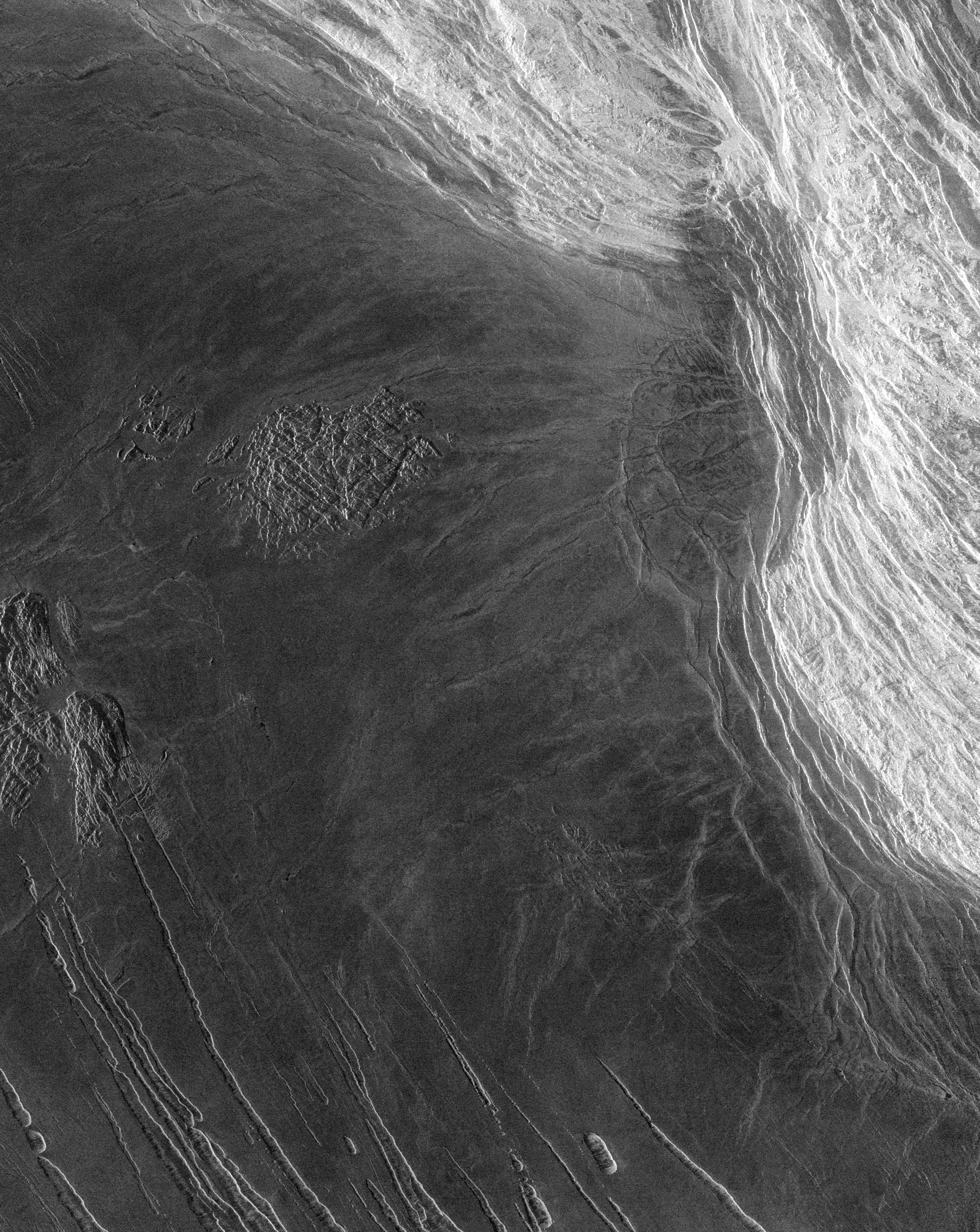
Maxwell Montes, highest point on Venus

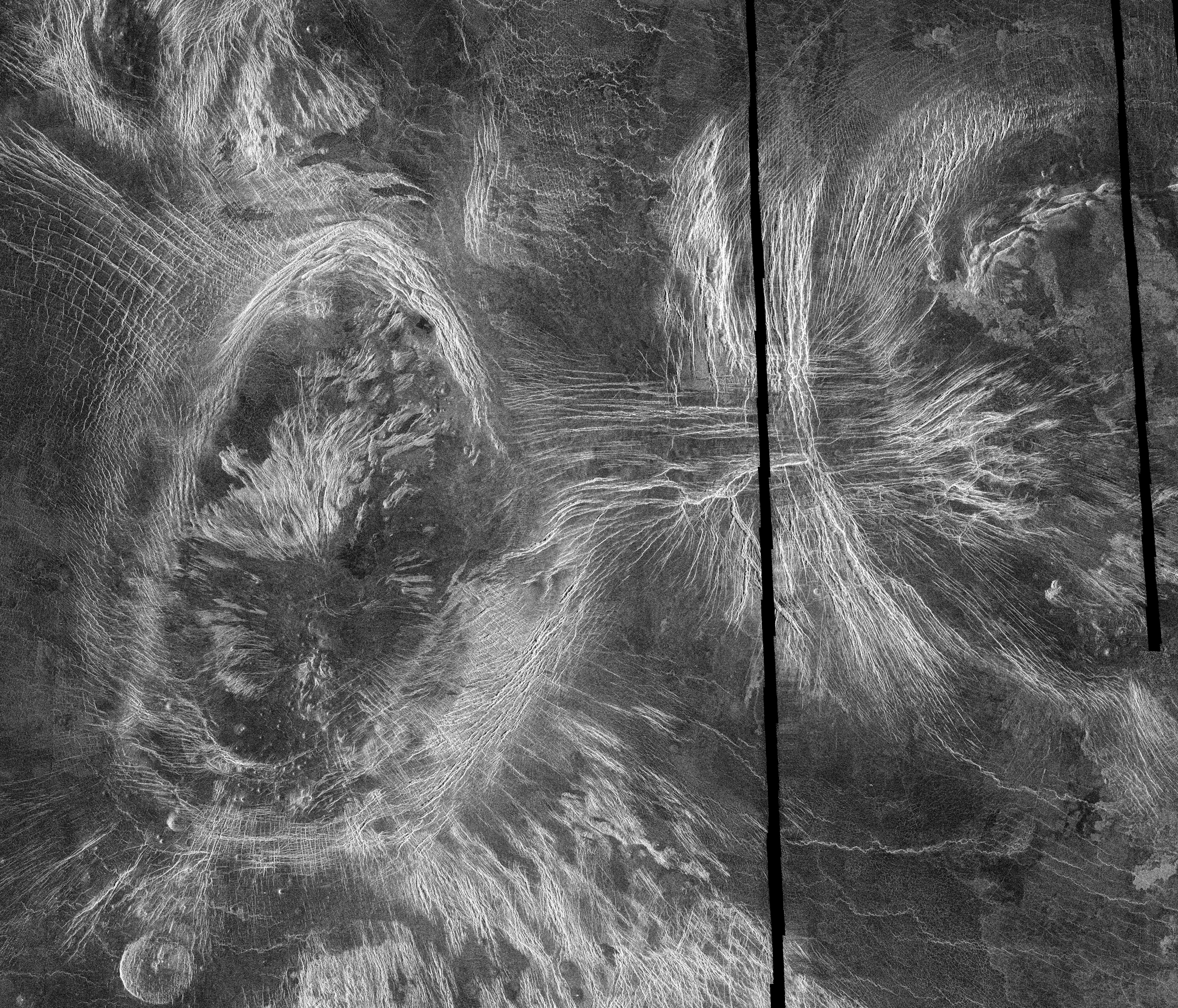
Volcanoes as seen in the Fortuna region of Venus

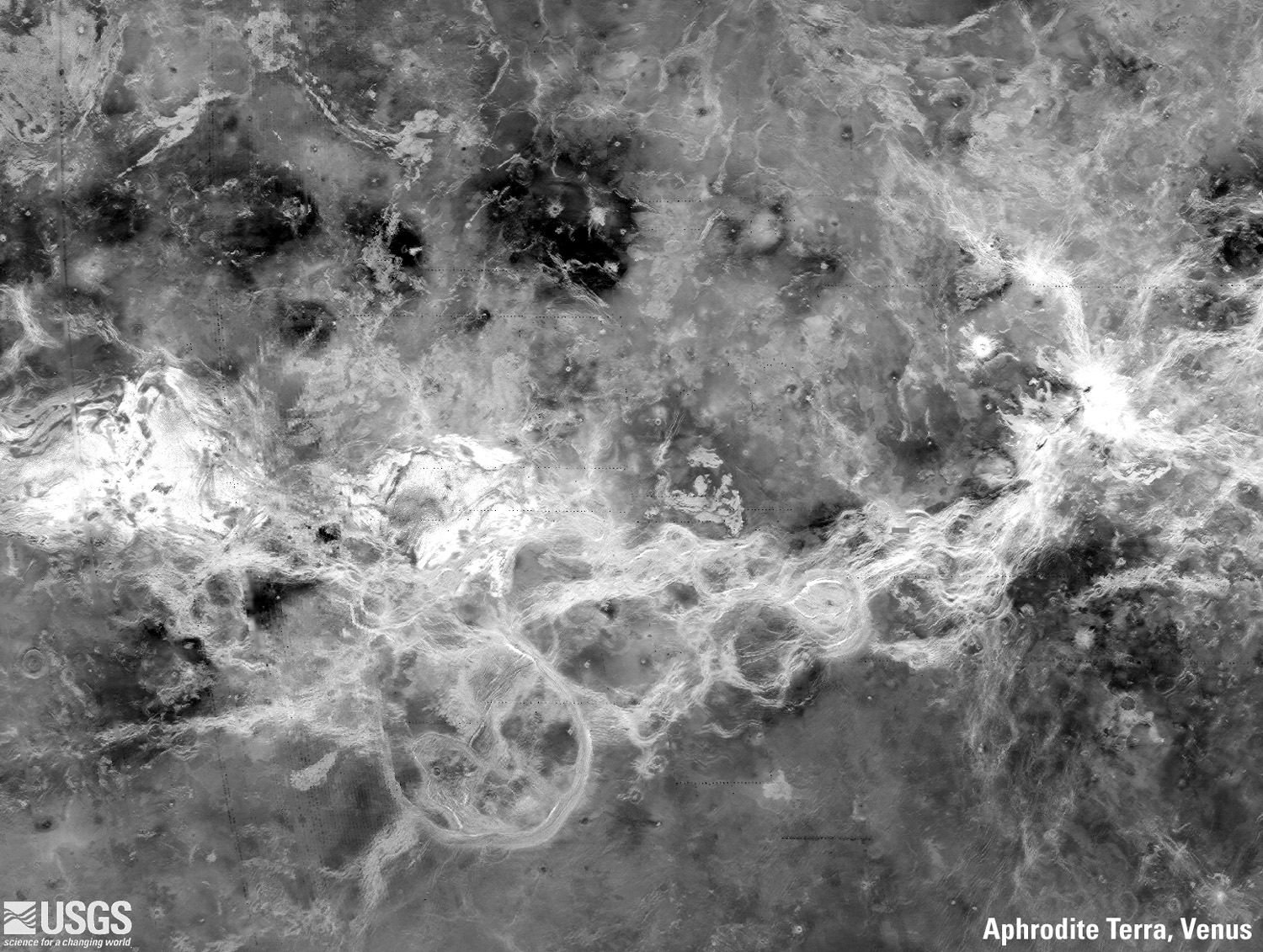
Aphrodite Terra, a rugged landscape

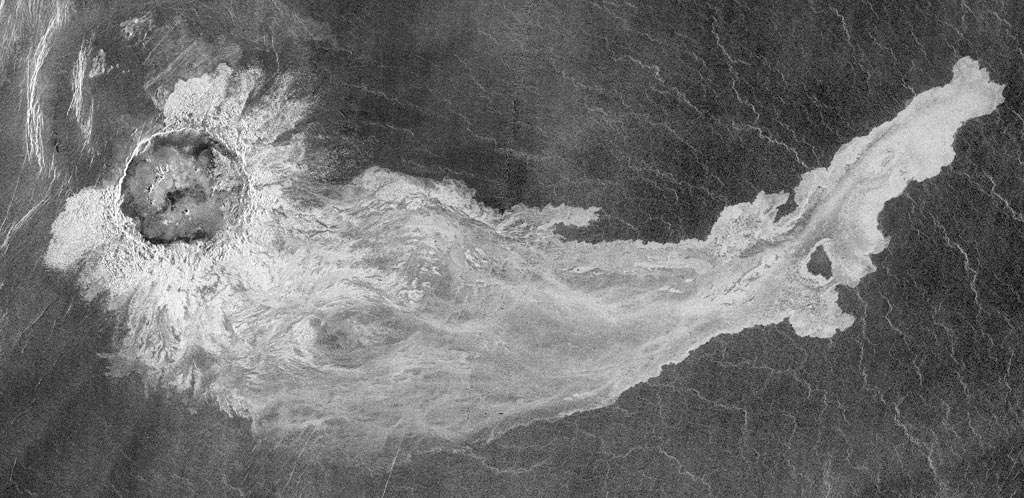
Addams crater

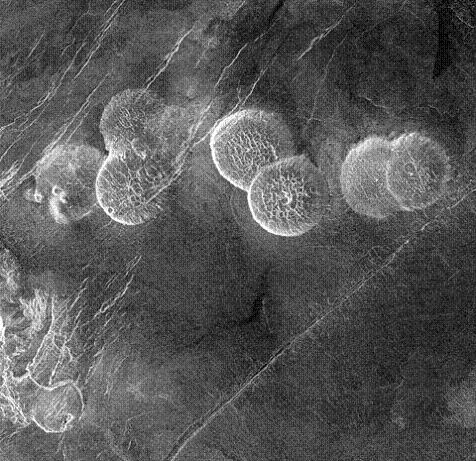
Pancake domes visible in Alpha Regio

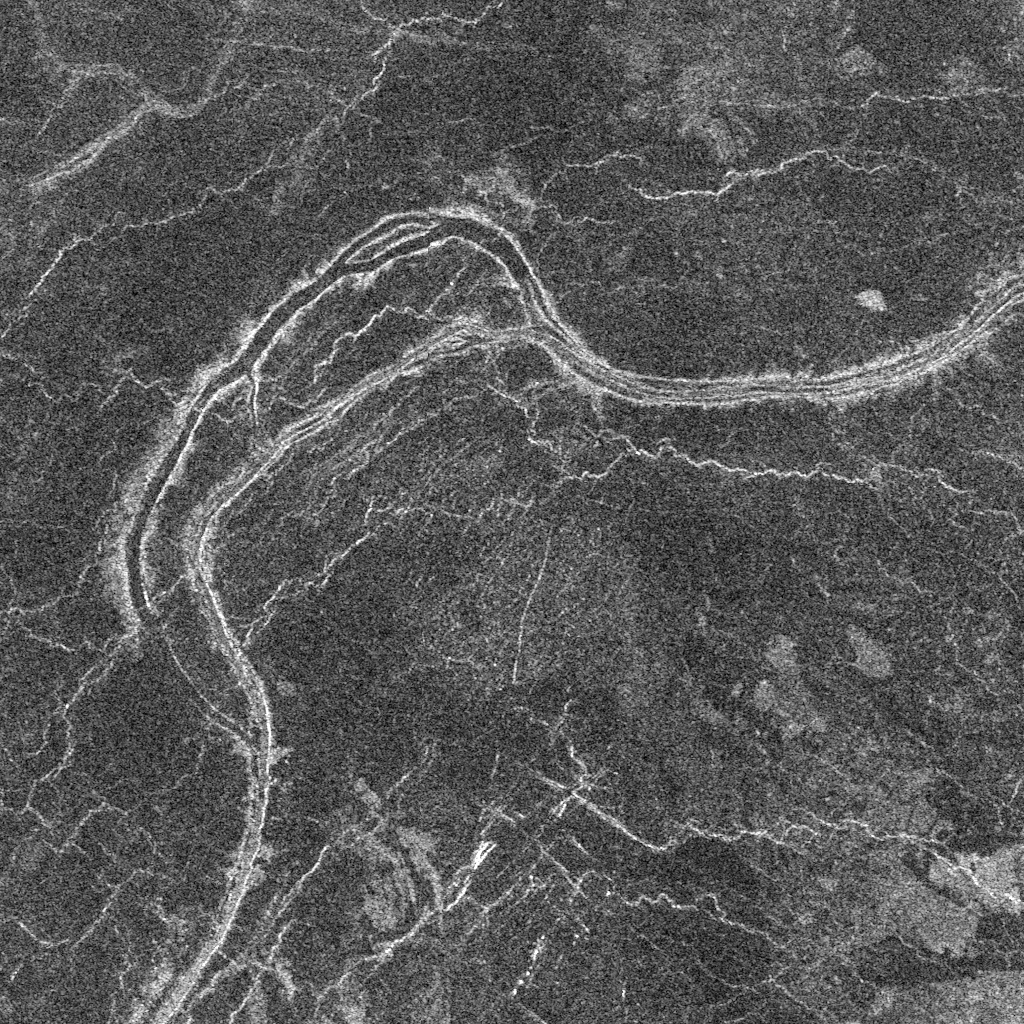
A meandering lava channel from Fortuna Tessera to Sedna Planitia

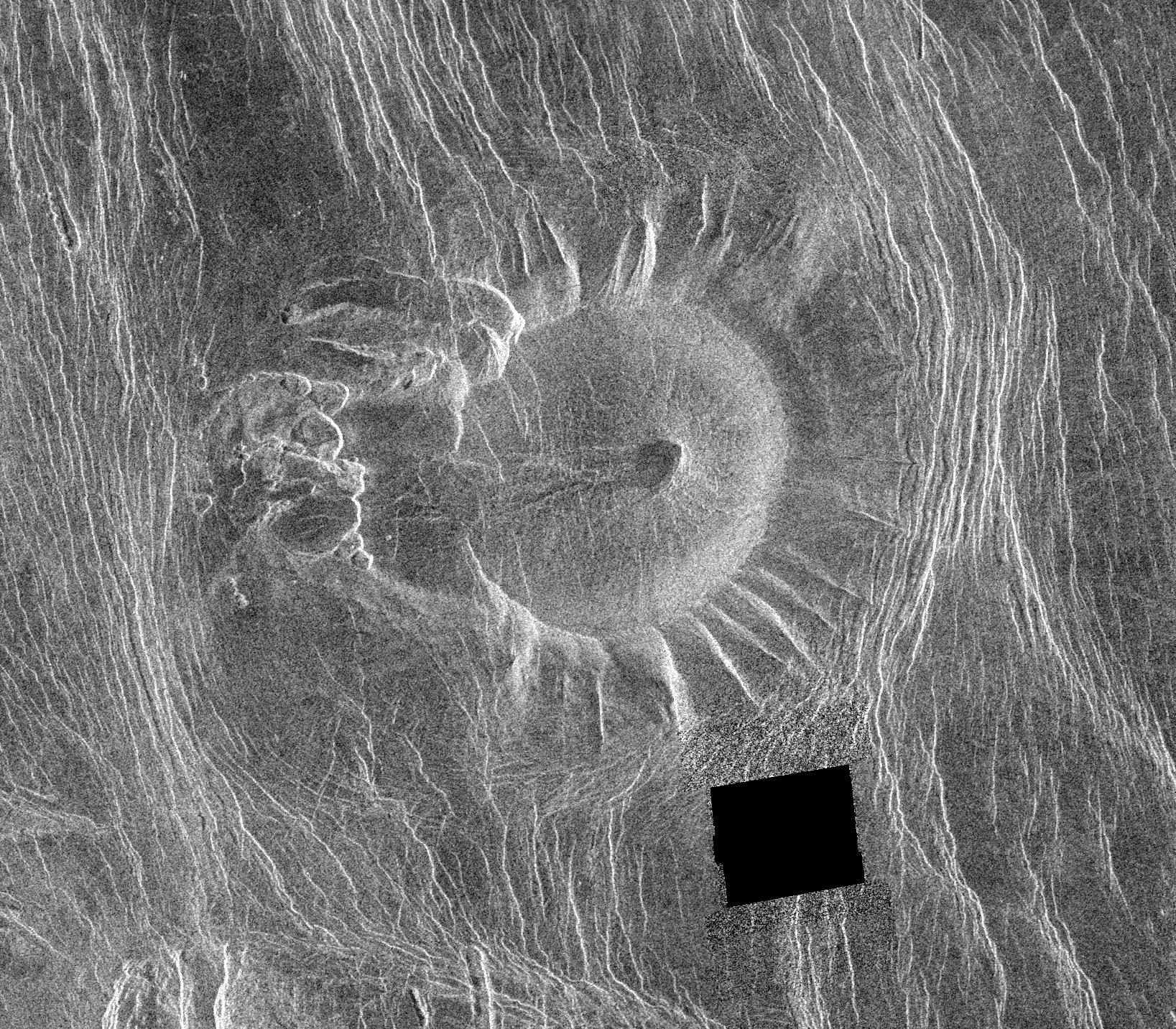
An unusual volcanic edifice in the Eistla region

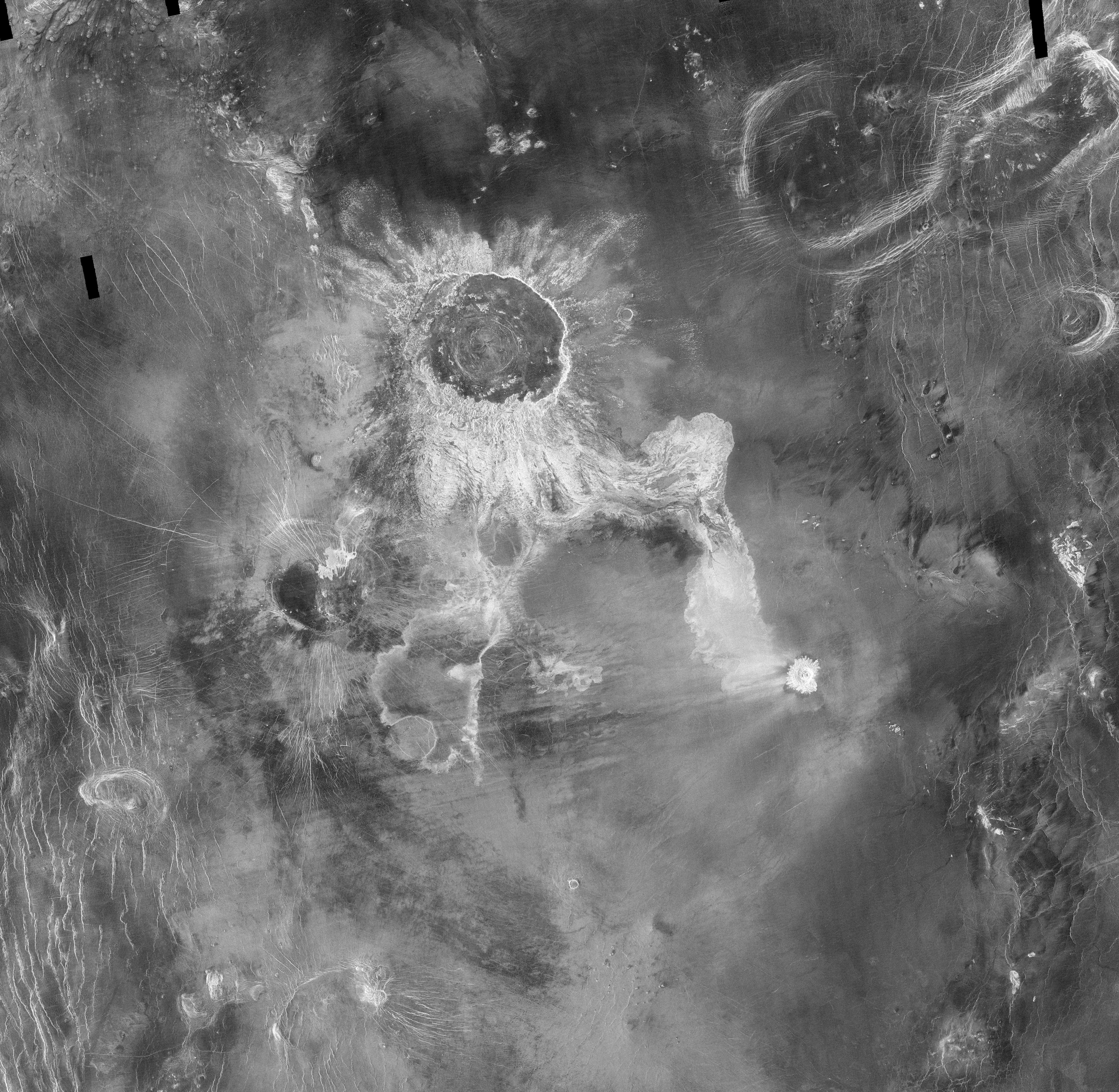
175-kilometer Isabella crater
Media related to Magellan radar imagery at Wikimedia Commons

== Scientists ==
The Magellan project was set up so that the initial images and data from the Magellan probe were only for use and study by a team of principal investigators from a variety of universities and institutions, and by the Magellan Project Science Team. These scientists were responsible for validating the data, contributing input for spacecraft acquisition of data, and interpreting the data results for their release to the public. Data was shared with three visiting Soviet scientists (Alexander Basilevsky, Effaim Akim and Alexander Zacharov), a first, and sensitive issue, for NASA at the time considering the Cold War was just coming to a close.

The Magellan Project Science room became notorious for its hanging of long thermal print strips of image data (FBIDRs) along the walls of a spacious room. This was the first form in which the imagery of the surface of Venus was seen due to the long, narrow swathes acquired by the spacecraft. Significant guests during the mission's operation included Margaret Thatcher.

After the initial investigation stage Magellan's full data set was released for public consumption.

=== Project Science Team ===
The Magellan Project Science Team consisted of Dr. R. Stephen Saunders, the Project Scientist; Dr. Ellen Stofan, the Deputy Project Scientist; research assistants Tim Parker, Dr. Jeff Plaut, and Annette deCharon; and Project Science Aide, Gregory Michaels.

Other Magellan scientists were involved with the mission's science including principal investigators and three visiting Soviet scientists.

== End of mission ==
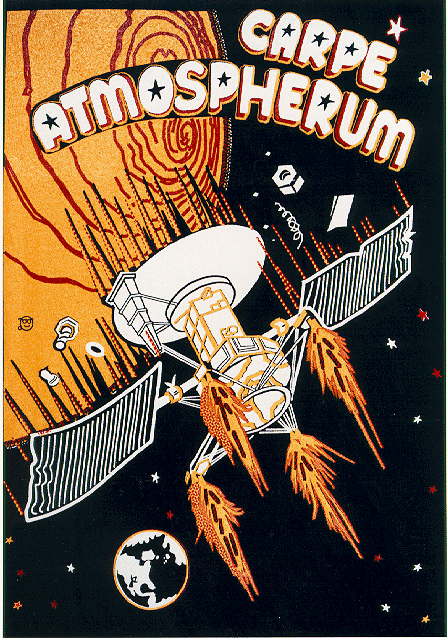
A poster designed for the Magellan end of mission

On September 9, 1994, a press release outlined the termination of the Magellan mission. Due to the degradation of the power output from the solar arrays and onboard components, and having completed all objectives successfully, the mission was to end in mid-October. The termination sequence began in late August 1994, with a series of orbital trim maneuvers which lowered the spacecraft into the outermost layers of the Venusian atmosphere to allow the Windmill experiment to begin on September 6, 1994. The experiment lasted for two weeks and was followed by subsequent orbital trim maneuvers, further lowering the altitude of the spacecraft for the final termination phase.

On October 11, 1994, moving at a velocity of 7 kilometers/second, the final orbital trim maneuver was performed, placing the spacecraft 139.7 kilometers above the surface, well within the atmosphere. At this altitude the spacecraft encountered sufficient ram pressure to raise temperatures on the solar arrays to 126 °C.

On October 13, 1994 at 10:05:00 UTC, communication was lost when the spacecraft entered radio occultation behind Venus. The team continued to listen for another signal from the spacecraft until 18:00:00 UTC, when the mission was determined to have concluded. Although much of Magellan was expected to vaporize due to atmospheric stresses, some amount of wreckage is thought have hit the surface by 20:00:00 UTC.

Quoted from Status Report - October 13, 1994

Communication with the Magellan spacecraft was lost early Wednesday morning, following an aggressive series of five Orbit Trim Maneuvers (OTMs) on Tuesday, October 11, which took the orbit down into the upper atmosphere of Venus. The Termination experiment (extension of September "Windmill" experiment) design was expected to result in final loss of the spacecraft due to a negative power margin. This was not a problem since spacecraft power would have been too low to sustain operations in the next few weeks due to continuing solar cell loss.

Thus, a final controlled experiment was designed to maximize mission return. This final, low altitude was necessary to study the effects of a carbon dioxide atmosphere.

The final OTM took the periapsis to 139.7 km (86.8 mi) where the sensible drag on the spacecraft was very evident. The solar panel temperatures rose to 126 deg. C. and the attitude control system fired all available Y-axis thrusters to counteract the torques. However, altitude control was maintained to the end.

The main bus voltage dropped to 24.7 volts after five orbits, and it was predicted that attitude control would be lost if the power dropped below 24 volts. It was decided to enhance the Windmill experiment by changing the panel angles for the remaining orbits. This was also a preplanned experiment option.

At this point, the spacecraft was expected to survive only two orbits.

Magellan continued to maintain communication for three more orbits, even though the power continued to drop below 23 volts and eventually reached 20.4 volts. At this time, one battery went off-line, and the spacecraft was defined as power starved.

Communication was lost at 3:02 am PDT just as Magellan was about to enter an Earth occultation on orbit 15032. Contact was not re-established. Tracking operations were continued to 11:00 am but no signal was seen, and none was expected. The spacecraft should land on Venus by 1:00 pm PDT Thursday, October 13, 1994.

== See also ==
- List of missions to Venus
- Venus Express
- Venera 15
- Venera 16
