= Izquierdo (crater) =

Crater on Mercury

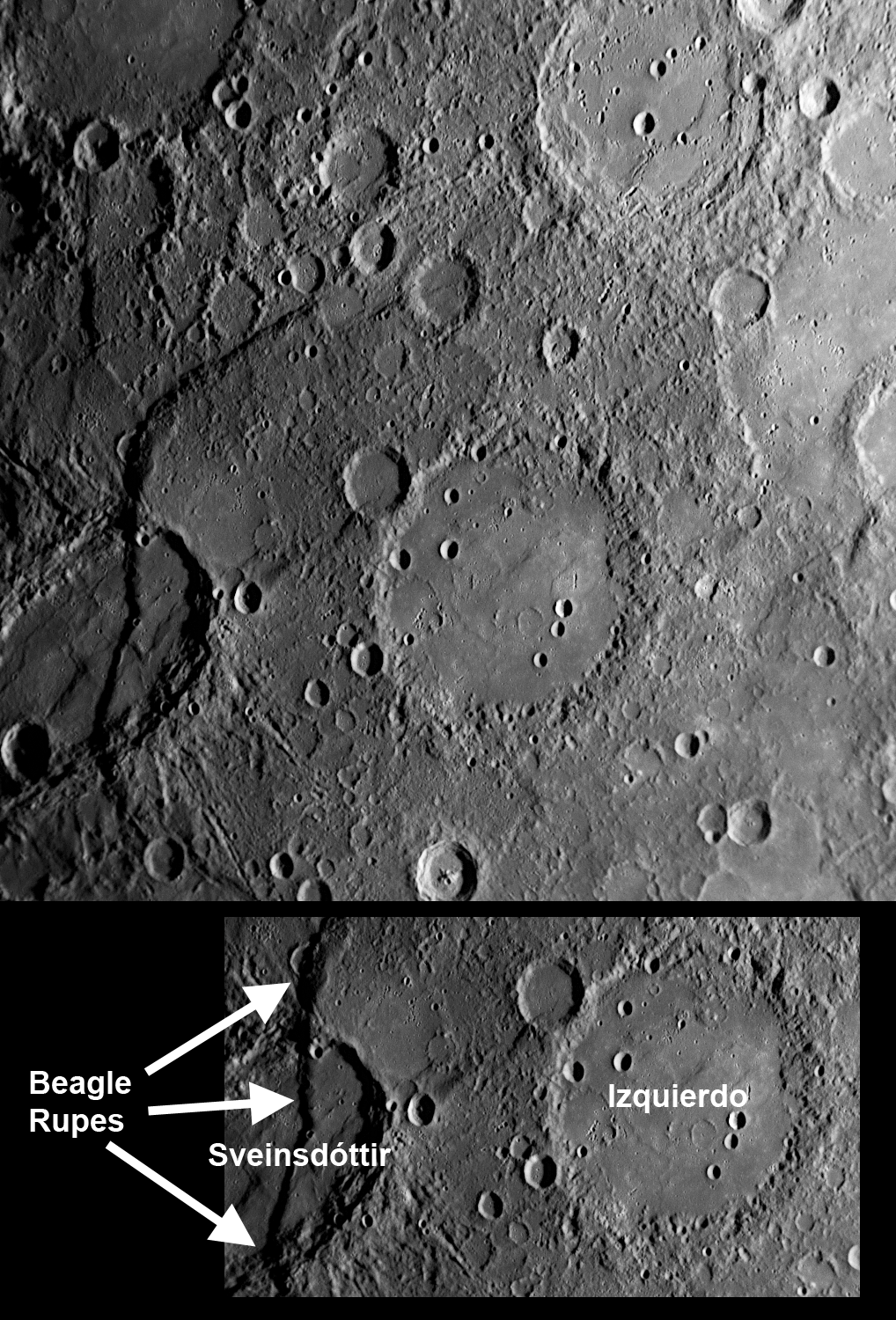
- MESSENGER image of Izquierdo, with Izquierdo and neighboring Sveinsdóttir and Beagle Rupes labelled in the bottom inset
- Feature type: Impact crater
- Location: Eminescu quadrangle, Mercury
- Coordinates: 1.66°S 252.96°W
- Diameter: 174 km (108 mi)
- Eponym: María Izquierdo

Izquierdo is a crater on Mercury. Its name was adopted by the International Astronomical Union (IAU) in 2009, for the Mexican painter María Izquierdo. The floor of Izquierdo is smooth, the result of having been partially filled with volcanic lava. Circular outlines of the rims of “ghost craters” – smaller, older craters that have been largely buried by the lavas that infilled the basin – are visible in a few places on Izquierdo's floor. The remnants of a buried inner ring are also barely discernible in spots, and it is one of 110 peak ring basins on Mercury. There have been more recent impacts into the floor of Izquierdo, resulting in some small, sharply defined craters.

Izquierdo is located to the east of Beagle Rupes and Sveinsdóttir crater. To the south is the crater Manley.

== Views ==
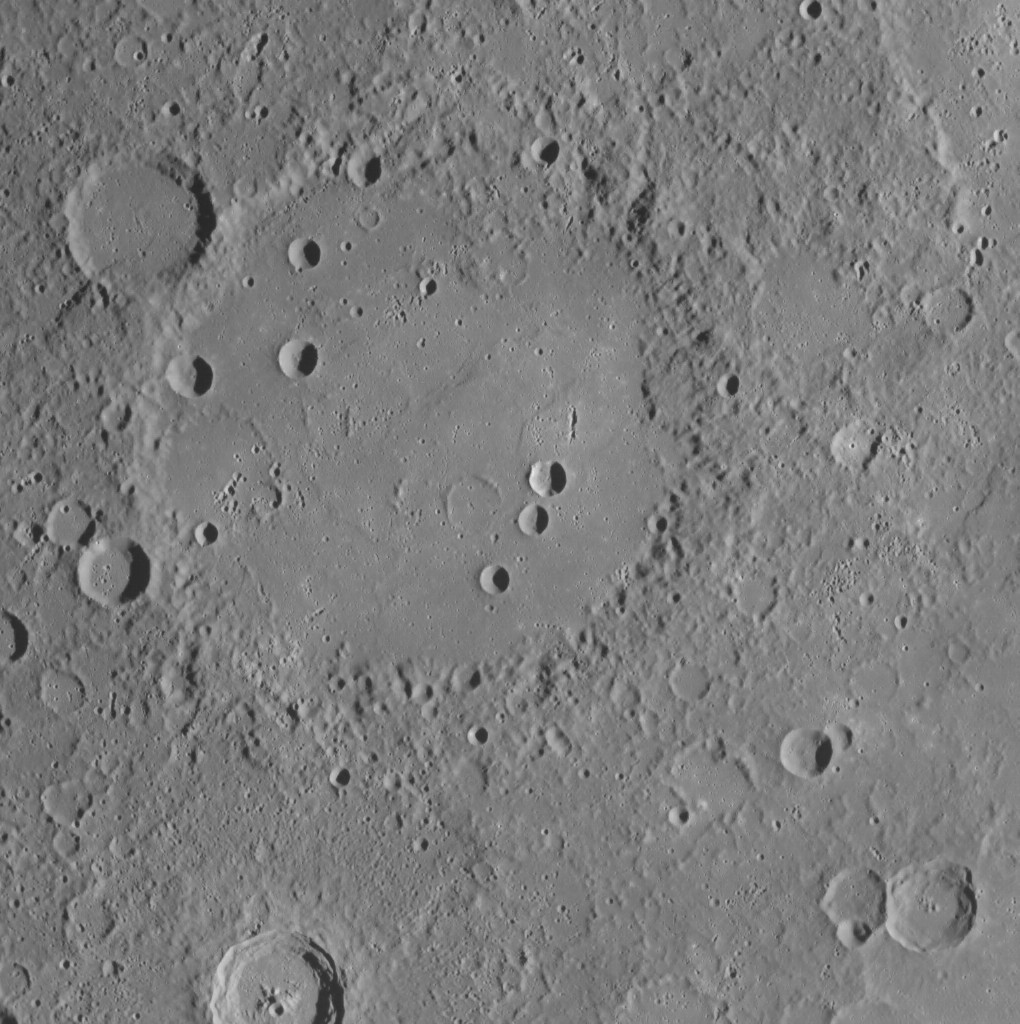
Another MESSENGER image

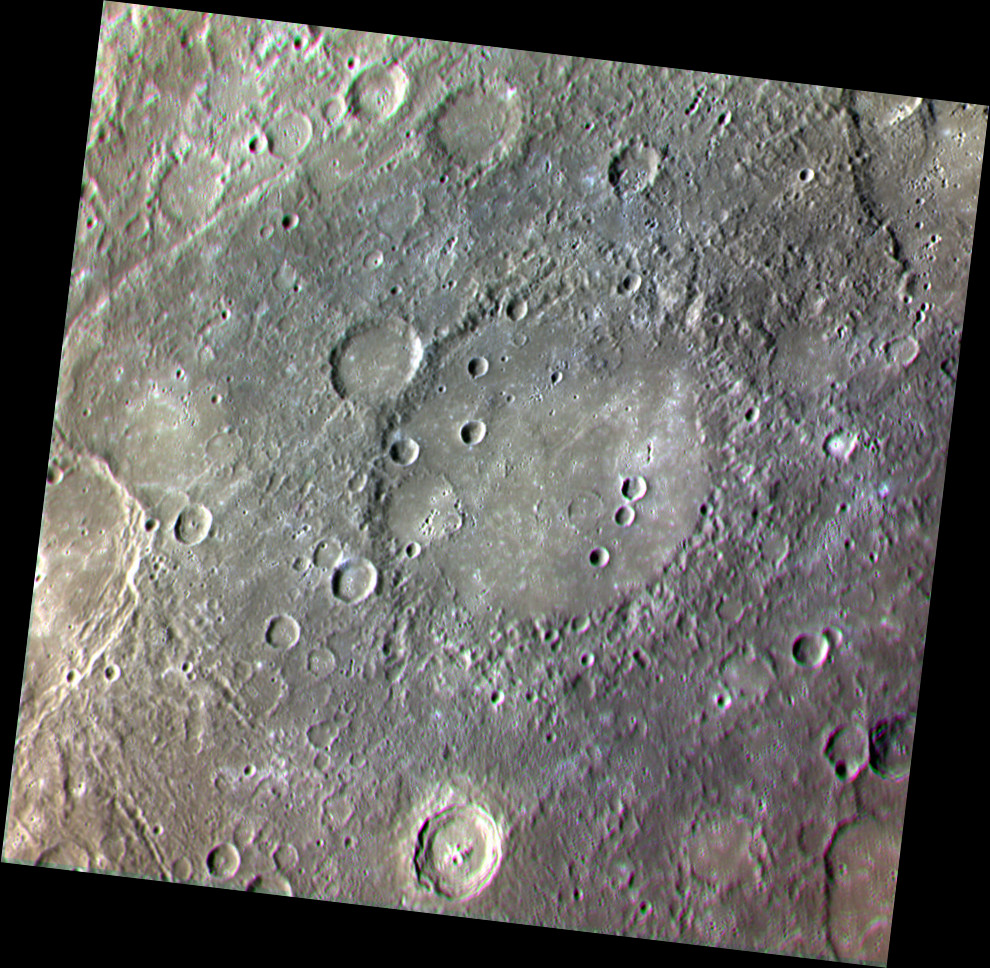
Approximate color image
