= Faulkner (crater) =

Crater on Mercury

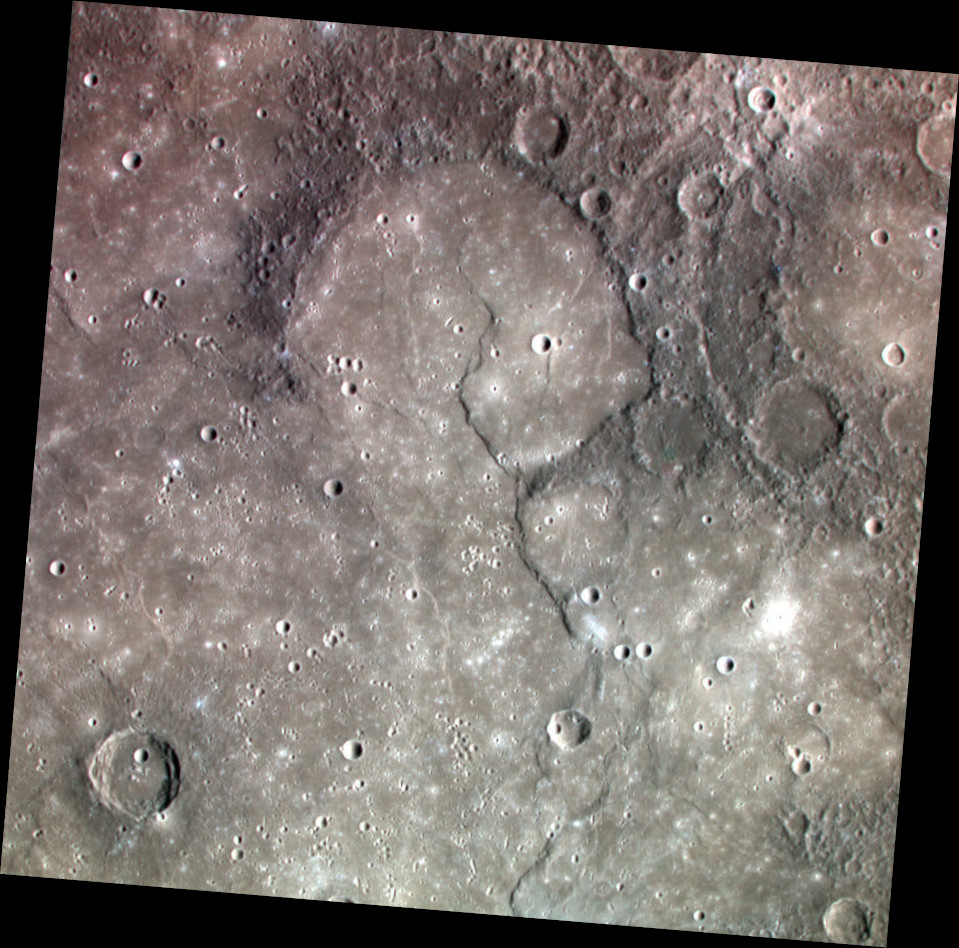
- Exaggerated color image by MESSENGER
- Feature type: Impact crater
- Location: Eminescu quadrangle, Mercury
- Coordinates: 8.08°N 76.97°E
- Diameter: 168 km (104 mi)
- Eponym: William Faulkner

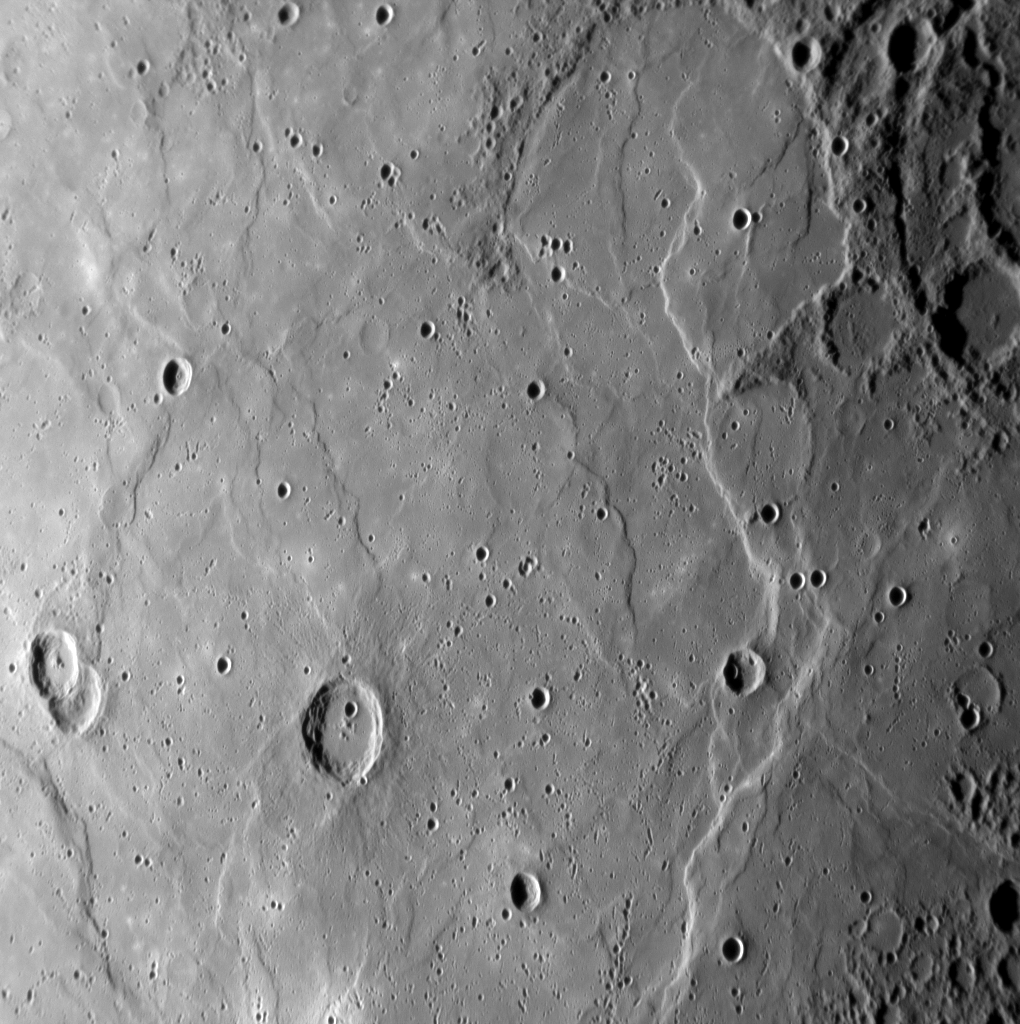
Part of Apārangi Planitia with Faulkner in upper right

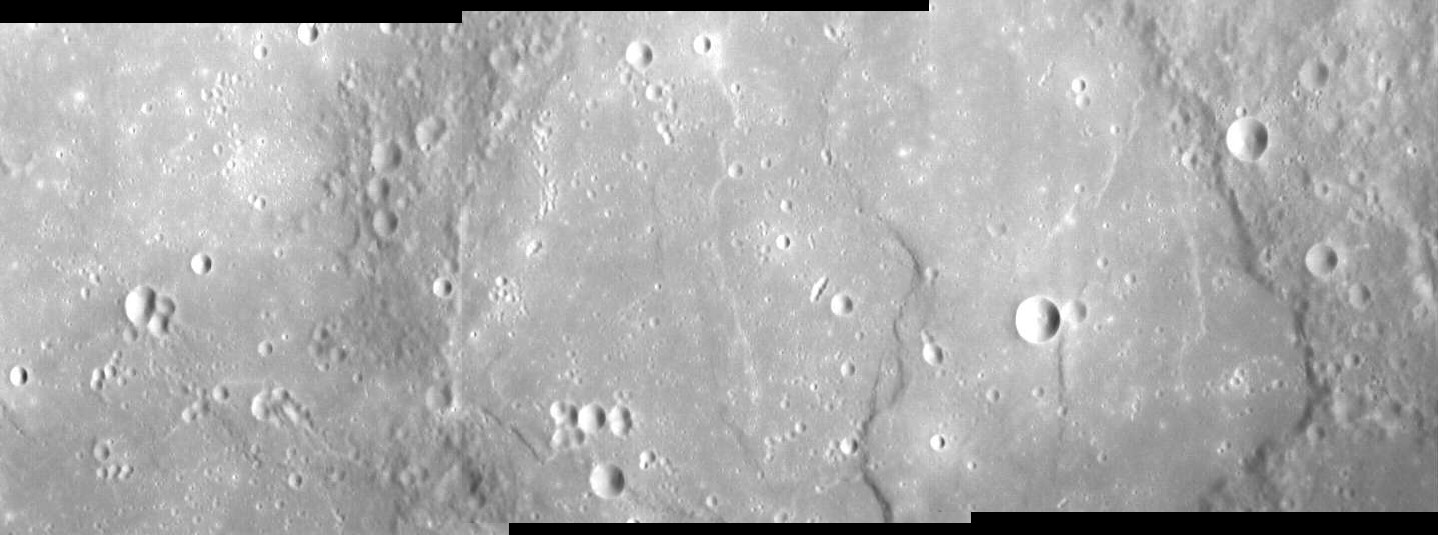
Central Faulkner crater

Faulkner is a crater on Mercury. It has a diameter of 168 kilometres (104 miles). Its name was adopted by the International Astronomical Union (IAU) on April 24, 2012. Faulkner is named for the American author William Faulkner.

Faulkner is part of Apārangi Planitia, a flat plain extending to the south and west of the crater. Immediately to the east of Faulkner is an unnamed peak ring basin, one of 110 on Mercury. Further to the southeast is another peak ring crater, Caravaggio.
