= Savage (crater) =

Crater on Mercury

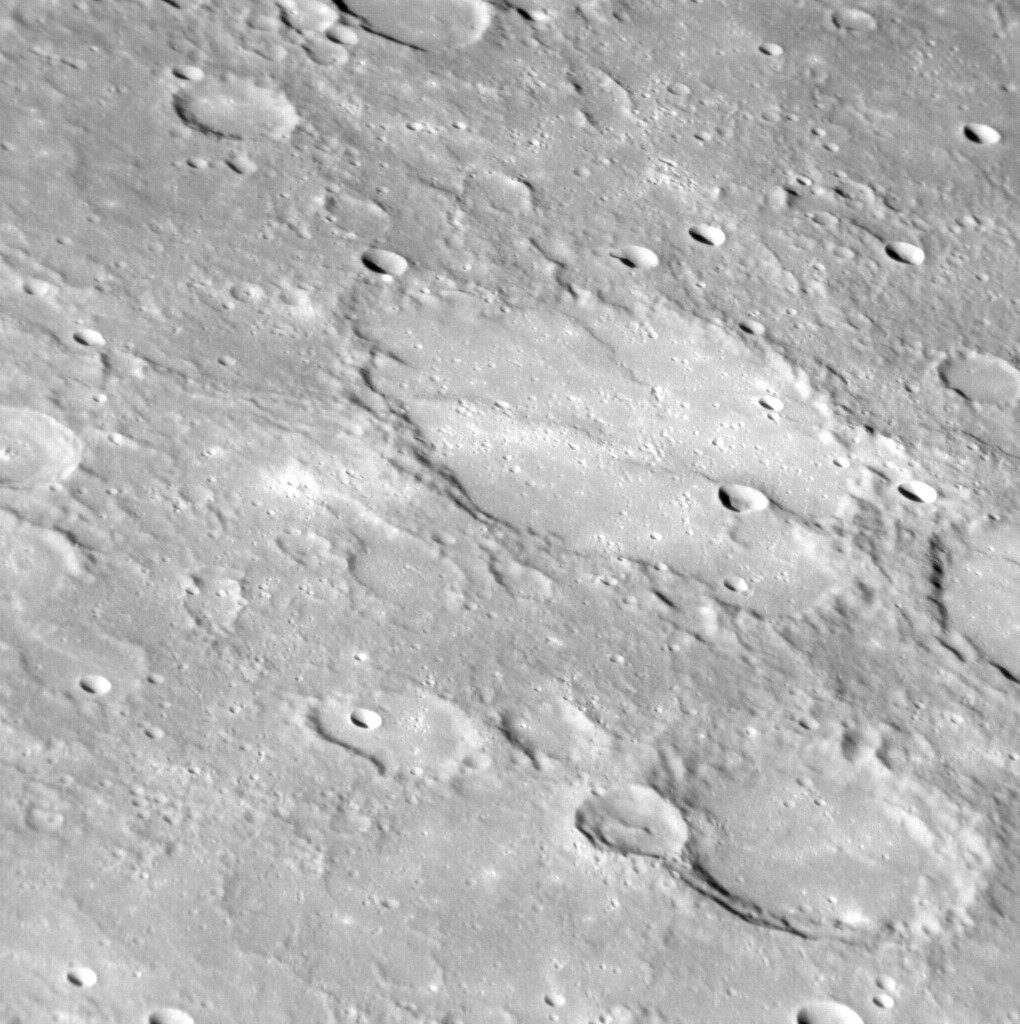
- Oblique MESSENGER NAC image
- Feature type: Impact crater
- Location: Eminescu quadrangle, Mercury
- Coordinates: 8.59°S 266.59°W
- Diameter: 93 km
- Eponym: Augusta Savage

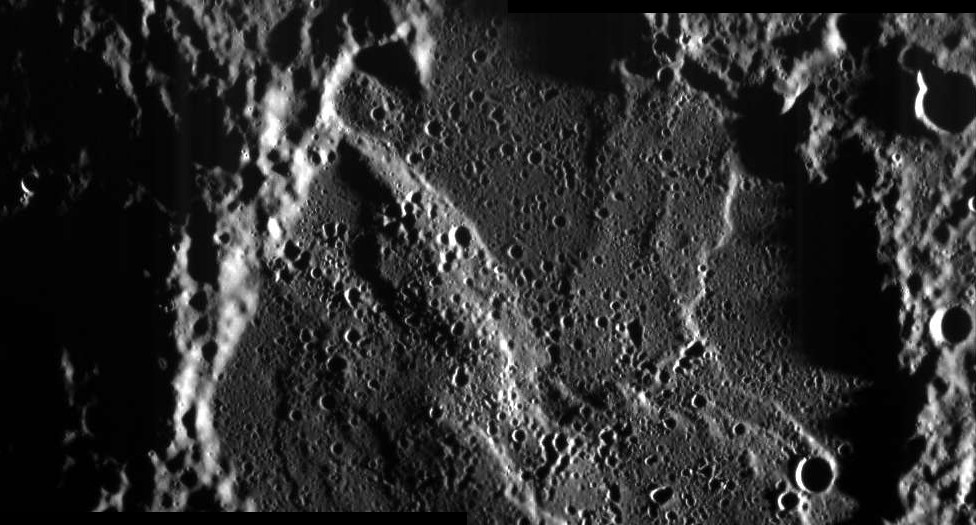
Savage crater at a low sun angle

Savage is a crater on Mercury. Its name was adopted by the International Astronomical Union (IAU) in 2013, and is named for the American sculptor Augusta Savage.

The scarps Blossom Rupes extend from Savage to the southern rim of Caravaggio crater.

Savage is northwest of the smaller but similar Ruysch crater.
