= Ruysch (crater) =

Crater on Mercury

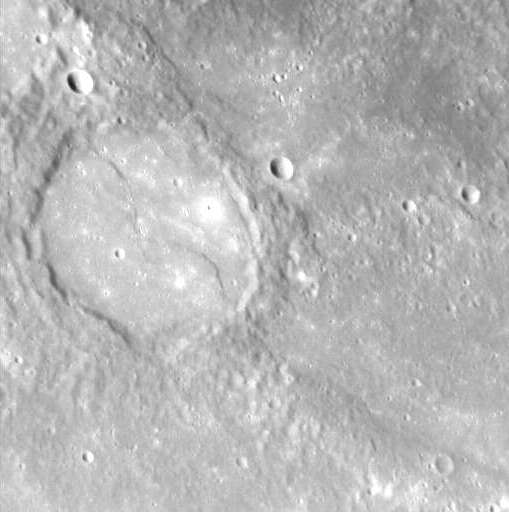
- MESSENGER NAC image
- Feature type: Impact crater
- Location: Eminescu quadrangle, Mercury
- Coordinates: 10.7°S 265.88°W
- Diameter: 64 km
- Eponym: Rachel Ruysch

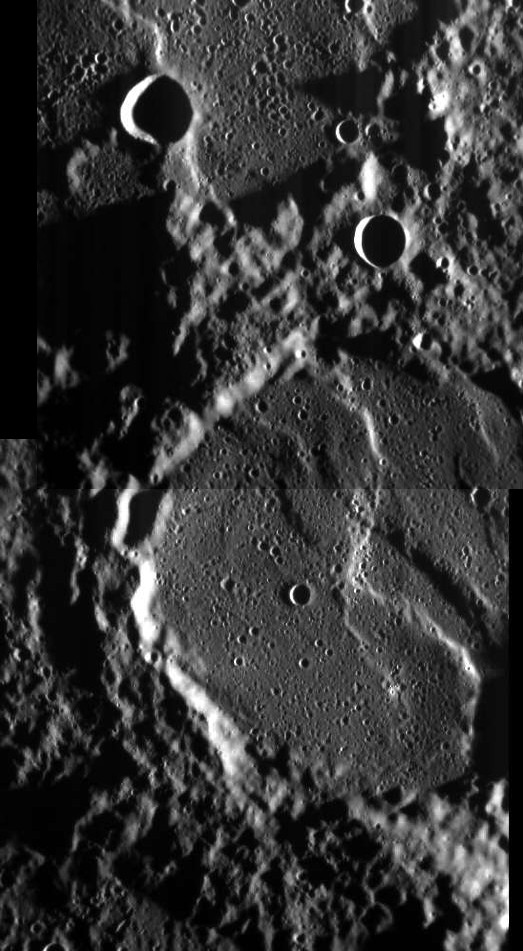
Ruysch at a low sun angle

Ruysch is a crater on Mercury. Its name was adopted by the International Astronomical Union (IAU) in 2013, and is named for the Netherland painter Rachel Ruysch.

Ruysch is southeast of the larger but similar Savage crater.
