= Apārangi Planitia =

Geologic basin on Mercury

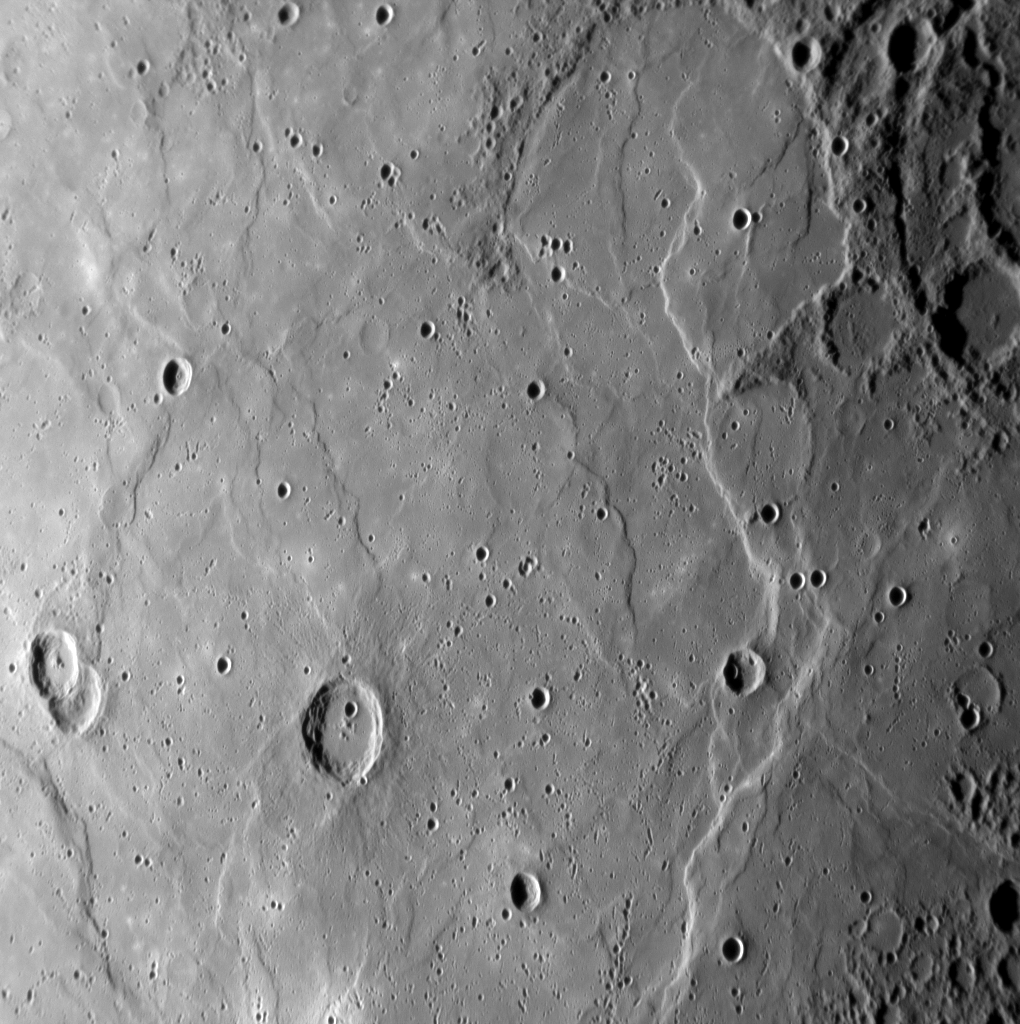
- MESSENGER image
- Feature type: Planitia
- Location: Eminescu quadrangle, Mercury
- Coordinates: 6.70°S 289.38°W
- Eponym: Māori word for the planet Mercury

Apārangi Planitia is a large plain on Mercury, approximately 1077 km across. It was named in 2017 by the IAU.

The crater Faulkner forms the northeastern part of the Planitia. Firdousi crater lies on the western margin, and Bagryana lies on the southeastern margin.

Eastern Apārangi Planitia is within the Eminescu quadrangle, and the western part is within the Derain quadrangle.
