= Bagryana (crater) =

Crater on Mercury

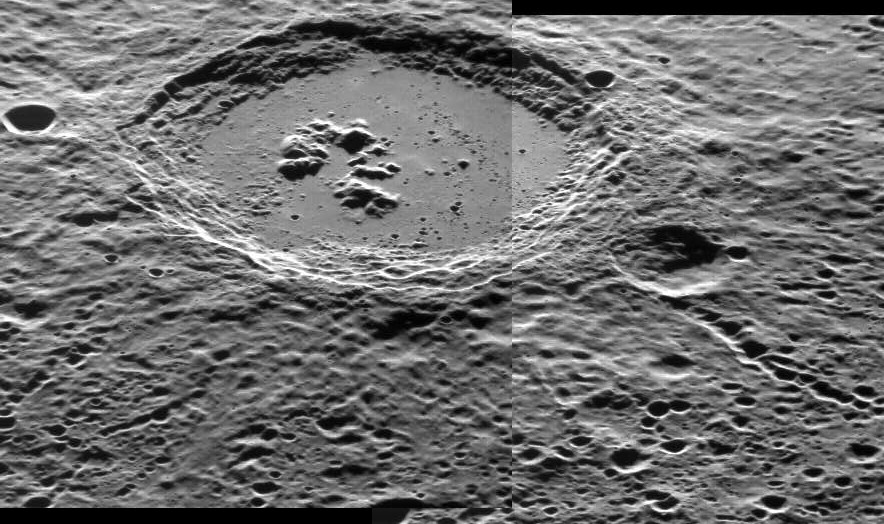
- Oblique view of Bagryana from the MESSENGER NAC instrument
- Feature type: Central-peak impact crater
- Location: Eminescu quadrangle, Mercury
- Coordinates: 3.89°S 283.73°W
- Diameter: 101 km (63 mi)
- Eponym: Elisaveta Bagryana

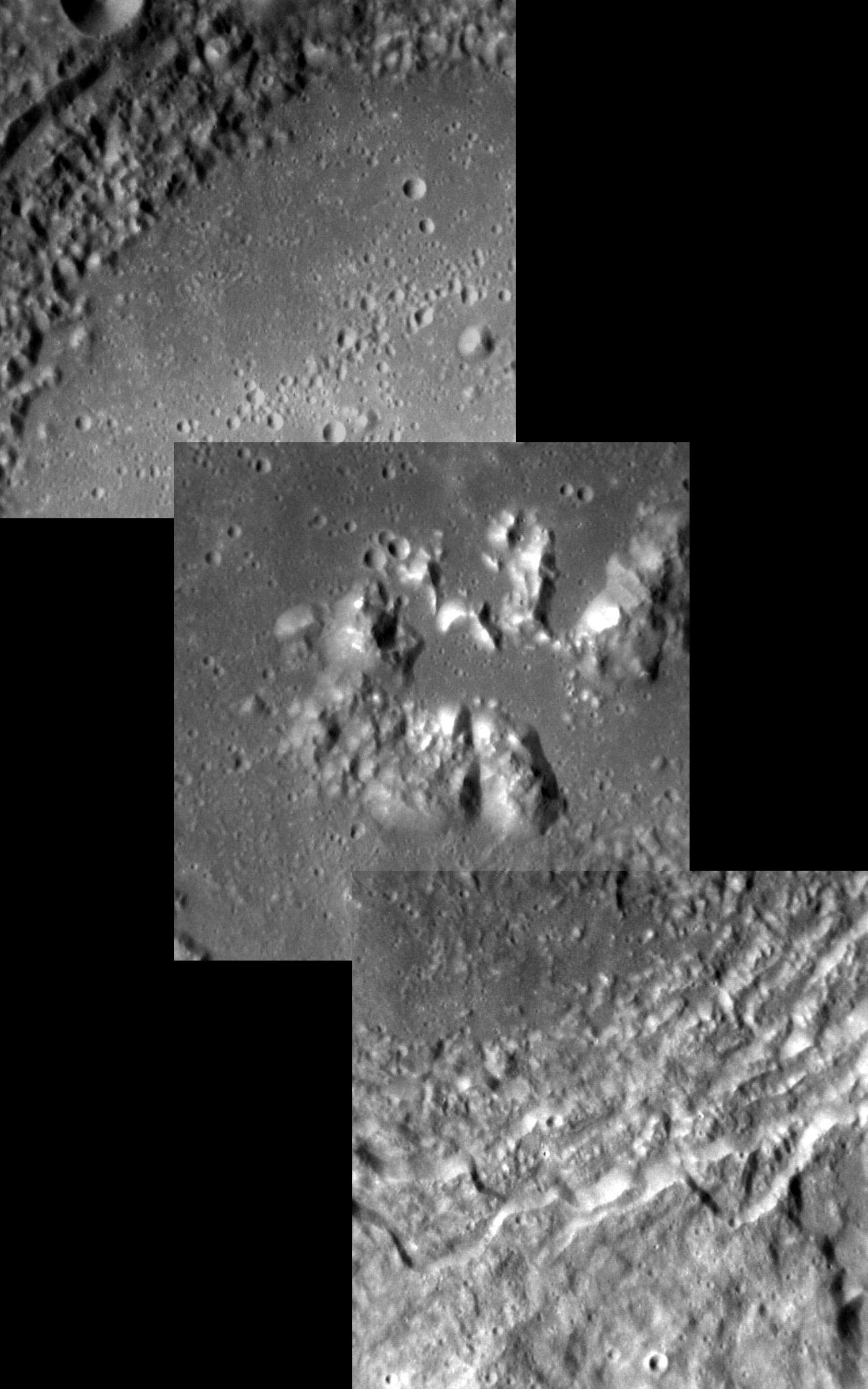
Another MESSENGER NAC mosaic

Bagryana is a crater on Mercury. Its name was adopted by the International Astronomical Union (IAU) in 2017, after Bulgarian poet Elisaveta Bagryana.

Bagryana lies on the southern margin of Apārangi Planitia.
