= Sveinsdóttir (crater) =

Elongated crater on Mercury

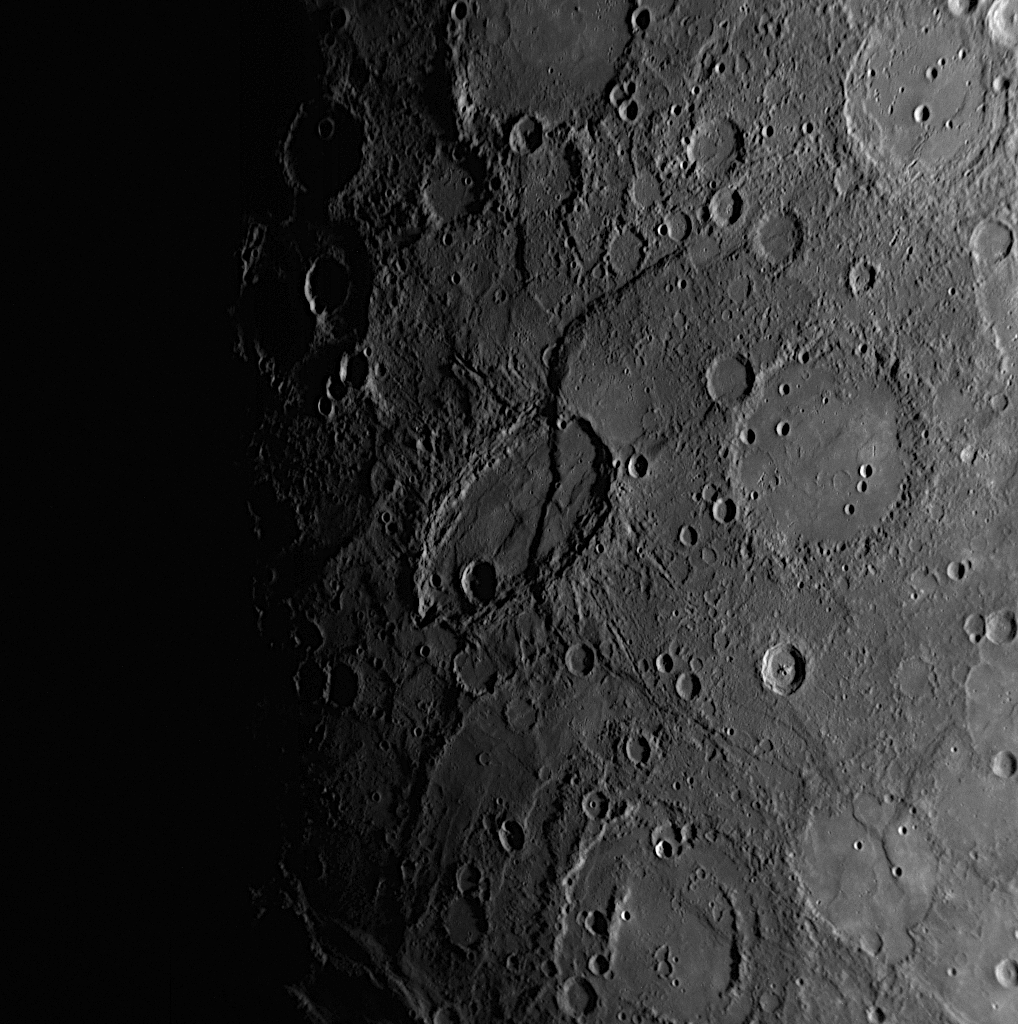
- Feature type: Impact crater
- Location: Eminescu quadrangle, Mercury
- Coordinates: 2.83°S 259.68°W
- Diameter: 212.79 km (132.22 mi)
- Eponym: Júlíana Sveinsdóttir

Sveinsdóttir is a large, elongated impact crater on Mercury. Its dimensions are 220 × 120 km.

Sveinsdóttir crater is a distinctive feature on Mercury's landscape. Unusually elliptical in shape, the crater was produced by the impact of an object that hit Mercury's surface obliquely. The floor of Sveinsdóttir was later covered by the smooth plains material and deformed by wrinkle-ridges before the scarp called Beagle Rupes appeared.

More than 600 kilometers (370 mi) long and one of the largest fault scarps on the planet, Beagle Rupes marks the surface expression of a large thrust fault believed to have formed as Mercury cooled and the entire planet shrank. Beagle Rupes crosscuts Sveinsdóttir crater and has uplifted the easternmost portion of the crater floor by almost a kilometer, indicating that most of the fault activity at Beagle Rupes occurred after the impact that created Sveinsdóttir. Crosscutting relationships such as this are used to understand the sequence in time of the different processes that have affected Mercury's evolution.

The crater is named after Júlíana Sveinsdóttir, an Icelandic painter and textile artist.

To the east of Sveinsdóttir is the crater Izquierdo, and to the south is the peak ring crater Manley.
