= Hafiz (crater) =

Crater on Mercury

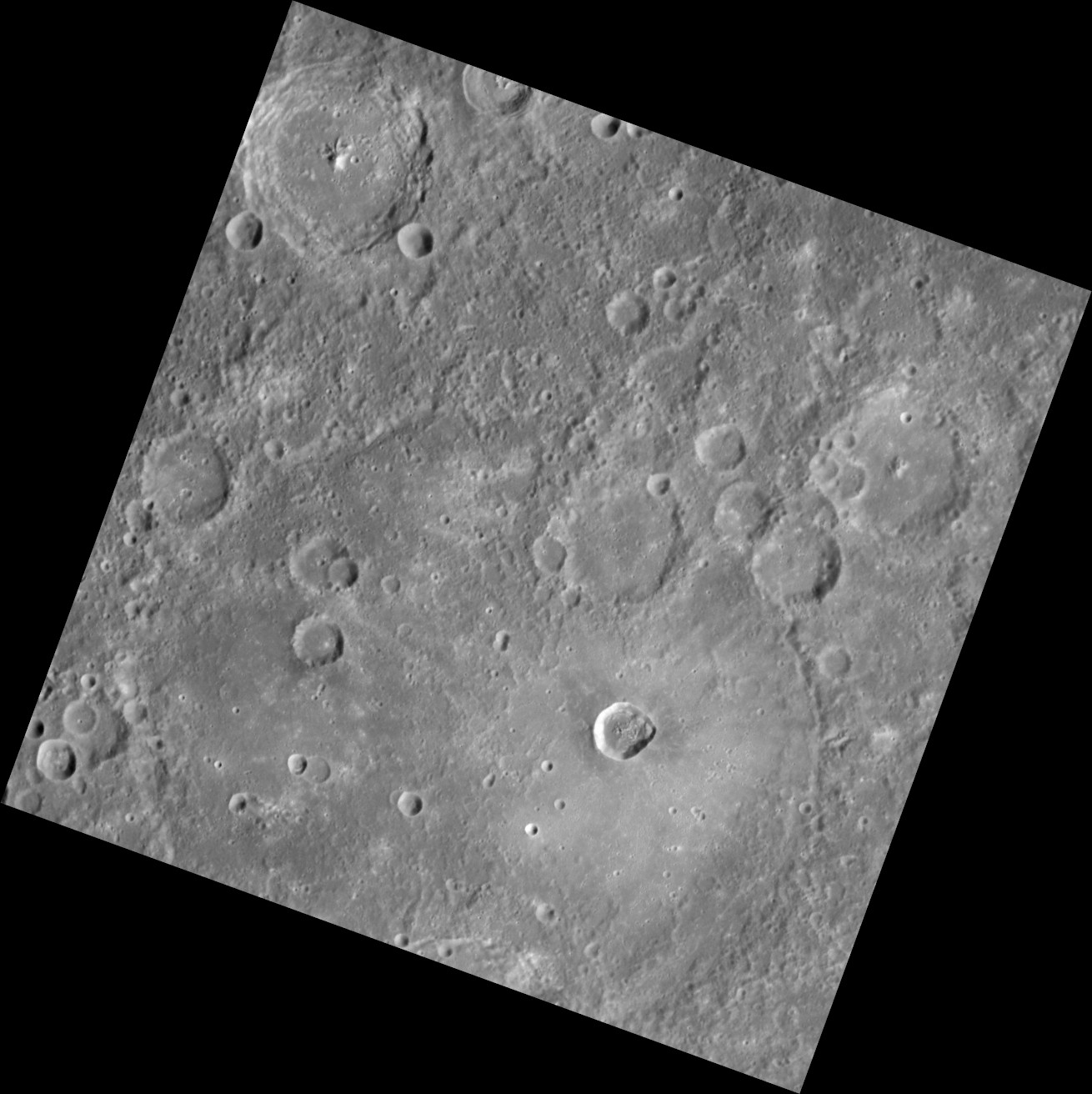
- MESSENGER WAC
- Planet: Mercury
- Coordinates: 19.5°N 79.56°E
- Quadrangle: Eminescu
- Diameter: 280 km (170 mi)
- Eponym: Hafez

Hafiz is a crater on Mercury. It has a diameter of 280 kilometres (170 miles). Its name was adopted by the International Astronomical Union (IAU) on June 23, 2014. Hafiz is named for the Persian poet Hafez.

Within Hafiz is a crater that is a dark spot of low reflectance material (LRM). The dark spot is associated with hollows. The small crater has landslides.

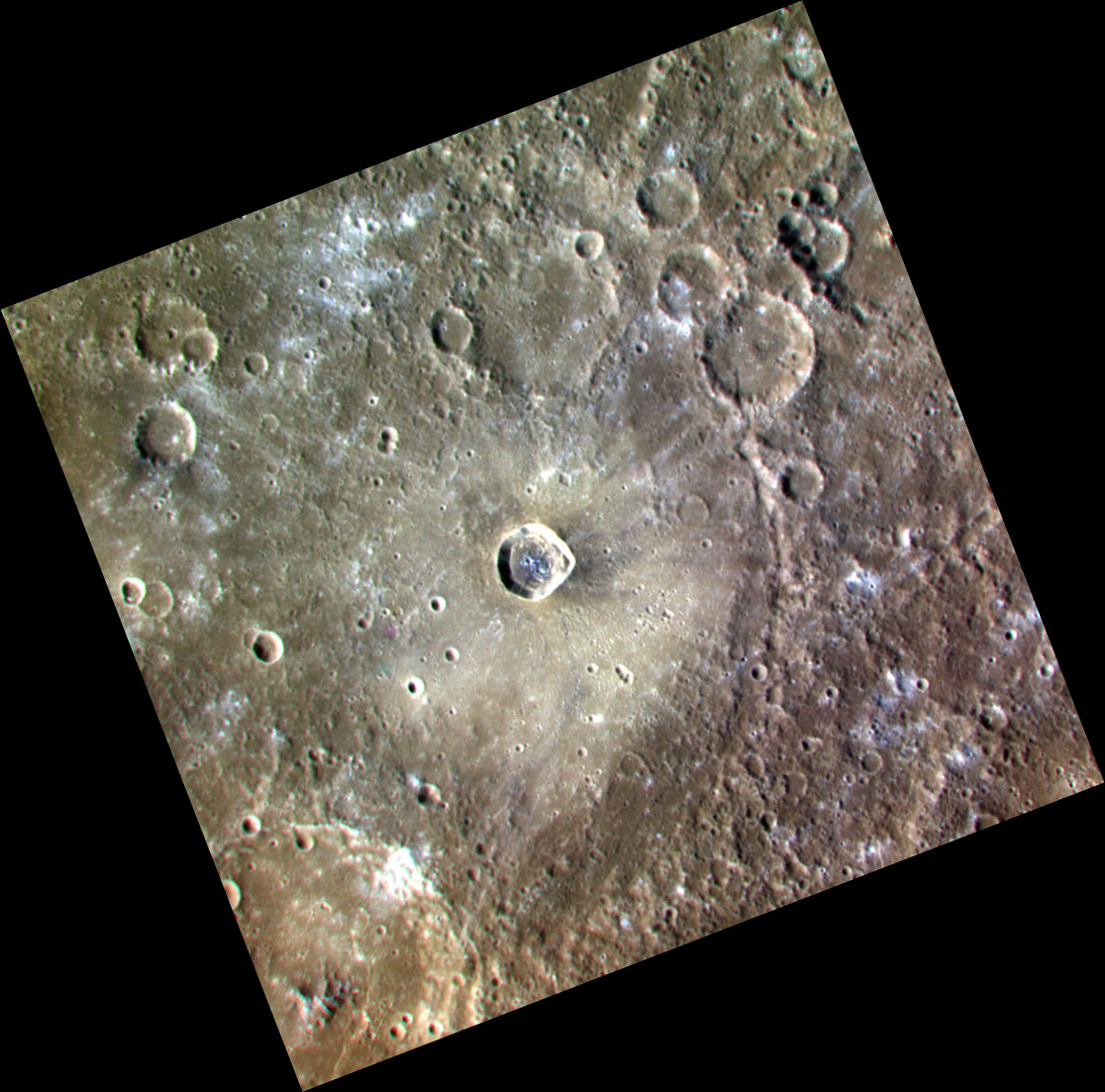
Approximate color image of part of Hafiz

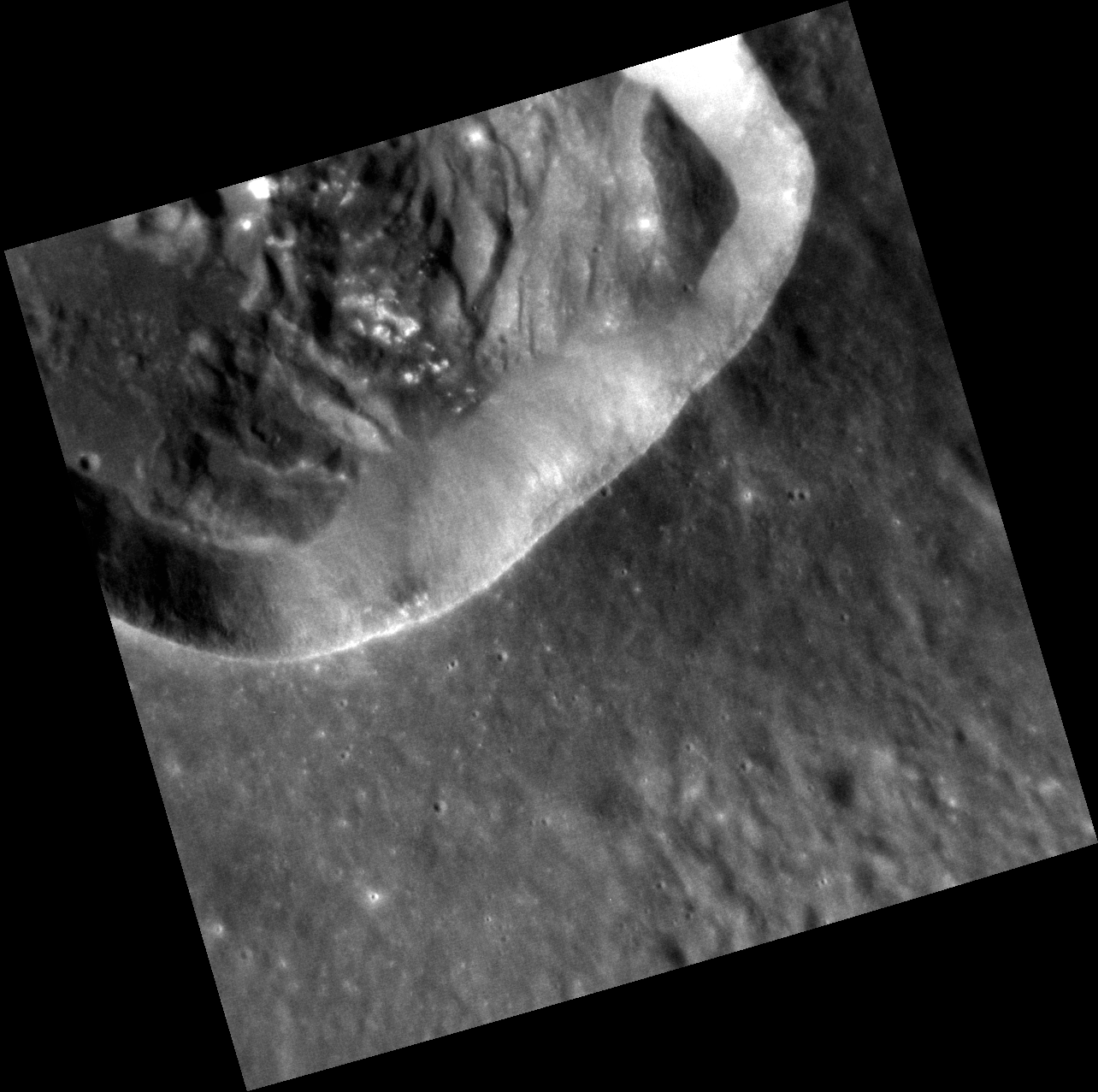
Part of the small, prominent crater within Hafiz crater that is a dark spot with hollows
