= Júlíana Sveinsdóttir =

Icelandic painter (1889–1966)

- Born: 31 July 1889; Vestmannaeyjar, Iceland
- Died: 17 April 1966; Denmark
- Known for: Painting; Textile arts mosaic
- Notable work: From the Westman Islands (1947)

Júlíana Sveinsdóttir (31 July 1889 – 17 April 1966) was one of Iceland's first female painters and textile artists. Taught initially by prominent Icelandic artist Þórarinn B. Þorláksson, Júlíana settled in Denmark and returned to Iceland in the summers, the visits inspiring her landscape paintings, one of which won the Eckersberg Medal in 1947.

Júlíana was an active supporter of artists and the arts. She was an early member of the Danish Female Artists' Society, and sat on the boards of the Charlottenborg Exhibition and the Royal Danish Academy of Fine Arts. Though best known for her painting, Júlíana Sveinsdóttir was also a significant artist working in textiles, her commissions including a rug that decorated the court chamber of the Supreme Court in Copenhagen.

== Learning to paint; leaving Iceland ==
Júlíana was born in Vestmannaeyjar (the Westman Islands), off the southern coast of Iceland, on 31 July 1889.

Júlíana's interest in art was sparked at school, and by the time she was twenty she had received lessons from one of Iceland's most famous twentieth century artists Þórarinn B. Þorláksson, and travelled to Copenhagen to study in several private drawing schools, and finally the Royal Danish Academy of Art. Apart from a brief period in the late nineteen twenties, Júlíana would make her home in Denmark, and though she always entertained the idea of returning to Iceland to live, she never did so. However, while she spent much of her working life in Denmark, her summers were spent in Iceland, and the country's landscapes were the principal subject of her paintings. She was intensely conscious of her heritage, writing "I have always wanted to bring my works back home and defend myself. Yes, defend my absence from the country, show people what I've done, remind them that I'm woven from a more Icelandic thread than anyone else".

== Júlíana Sveinsdóttir and the role of women as artists ==
The recognition of Júlíana's work, and the slow movement toward supporting herself through her art, coincided with the organisation and gradual acceptance of women in the European artistic community. She was an early (though not founding) member of the Danish Female Artists' Society (KKS), serving on its board from 1935 to 1949 and participating in its exhibitions. The goals of the KKS included increasing female representation on decision-making bodies, improving access for women to grants, as well as providing a social and artist network. From all of these things Júlíana benefitted. From 1941 to 1949 she was on the board of the Charlottenborg Exhibition, and in 1955 she was elected to the board of the Danish Royal Academy of Art: neither of these had had any female board members when the KKS had been founded. She also benefited from access to grants, including the Tagea Brandt travel stipend in 1946.

== Textile art ==
Working in Copenhagen Júlíana created abstract rug designs of note, including a piece which won the Gold Medal at the Italian Triennial in Milan, in 1951, the first design award won by an Icelander in an international exhibition. Júlíana Sveinsdóttir was later commissioned by the Danish State Artwork Fund to create a rug that decorated the court chamber of the Supreme Court in Copenhagen. Although her textile works were remarkable and attracted international acclaim, they went largely ignored in her home country for some decades, where only her paintings drew attention and reviews. It was not until the 1950s, and following the Triennial win, that there was finally in her own country a recognition of their importance and artistic merit.

== Legacy ==
Throughout her career, while she did paint still lives and portraits, it was Júlíana Sveinsdóttir's landscapes that aroused critical admiration and won awards, including the prestigious Eckersberg Medal in 1947. She is regarded as having been a significant innovator from the 1930s to the 1950s through her approach to the landscape subject and her colour palette.

Júlíana Sveinsdóttir was one of a number of Icelandic artists the impersonation of whose work was the subject of a 2005 court case.

The craters of Mercury are named after artists. Following the first Mercury fly-by of NASA spacecraft MESSENGER, one of the newly discovered craters was named after Júlíana Sveinsdóttir.

== Awards ==
- 1946: Tagea Brandt travel stipend
- 1947: Eckersberg Medal
- 1951: Gold Medal, Italian Triennial, Milan
