= Manley (crater) =

Crater on Mercury

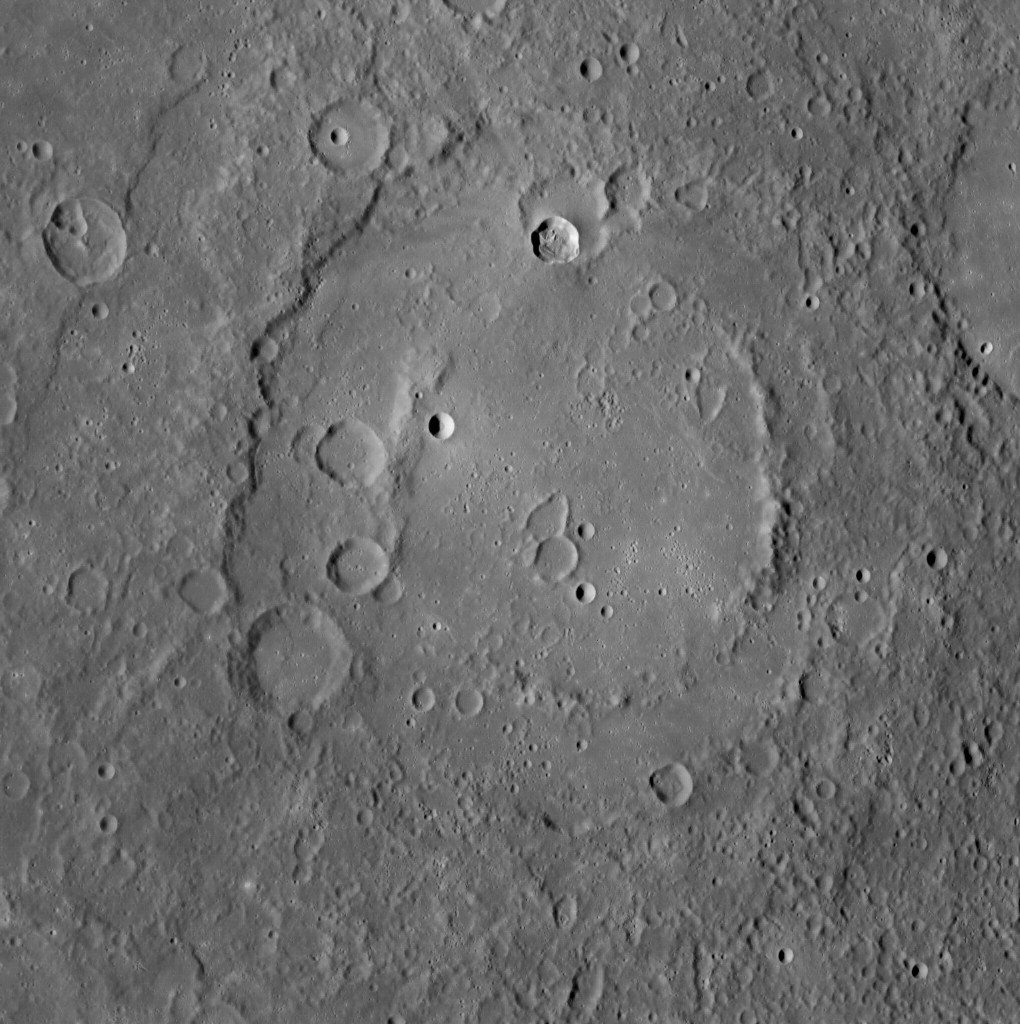
- MESSENGER WAC
- Planet: Mercury
- Coordinates: 10.53°S 256.61°W
- Quadrangle: Eminescu
- Diameter: 218 km (135 mi)
- Eponym: Edna Manley

Manley is a crater on Mercury. Its name was adopted by the International Astronomical Union (IAU) in 2023, for the Jamaican sculptor, painter, and printmaker Edna Manley, who lived from 1900 to 1987. A name for this crater was allocated at the request of the BepiColombo MCAM team, who realized that it would be prominent in images from BepiColombo's 3rd fly-by of Mercury, but had not yet been named.

Manley is one of 110 peak ring basins on Mercury.

Manley is located just west of Catuilla Planum and to the south of the craters Sveinsdóttir and Izquierdo.

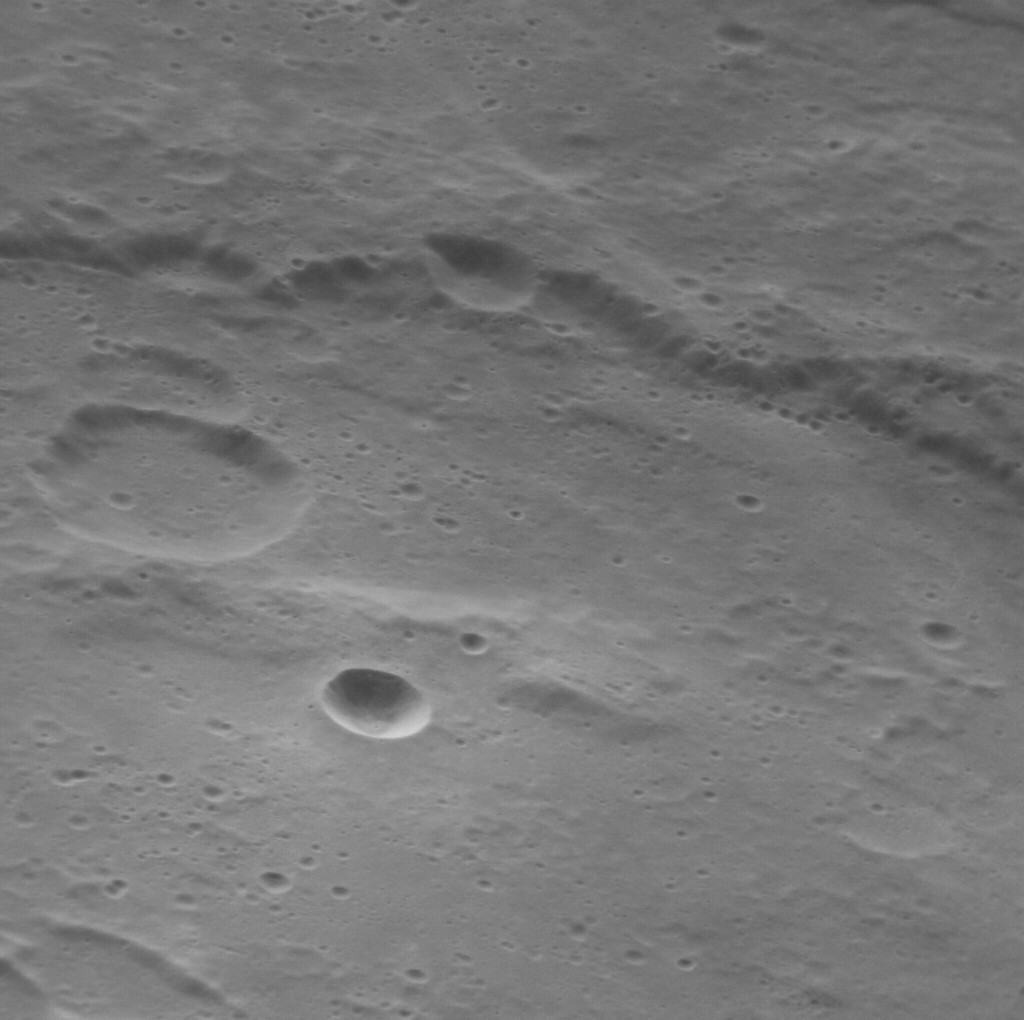
Oblique view of circular bright crater within Manley

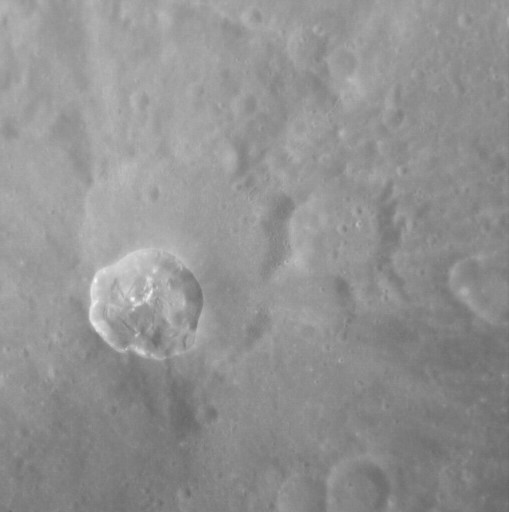
Bright crater within northern Manley crater. The crater has a ray system and the bright areas within it may be hollows.

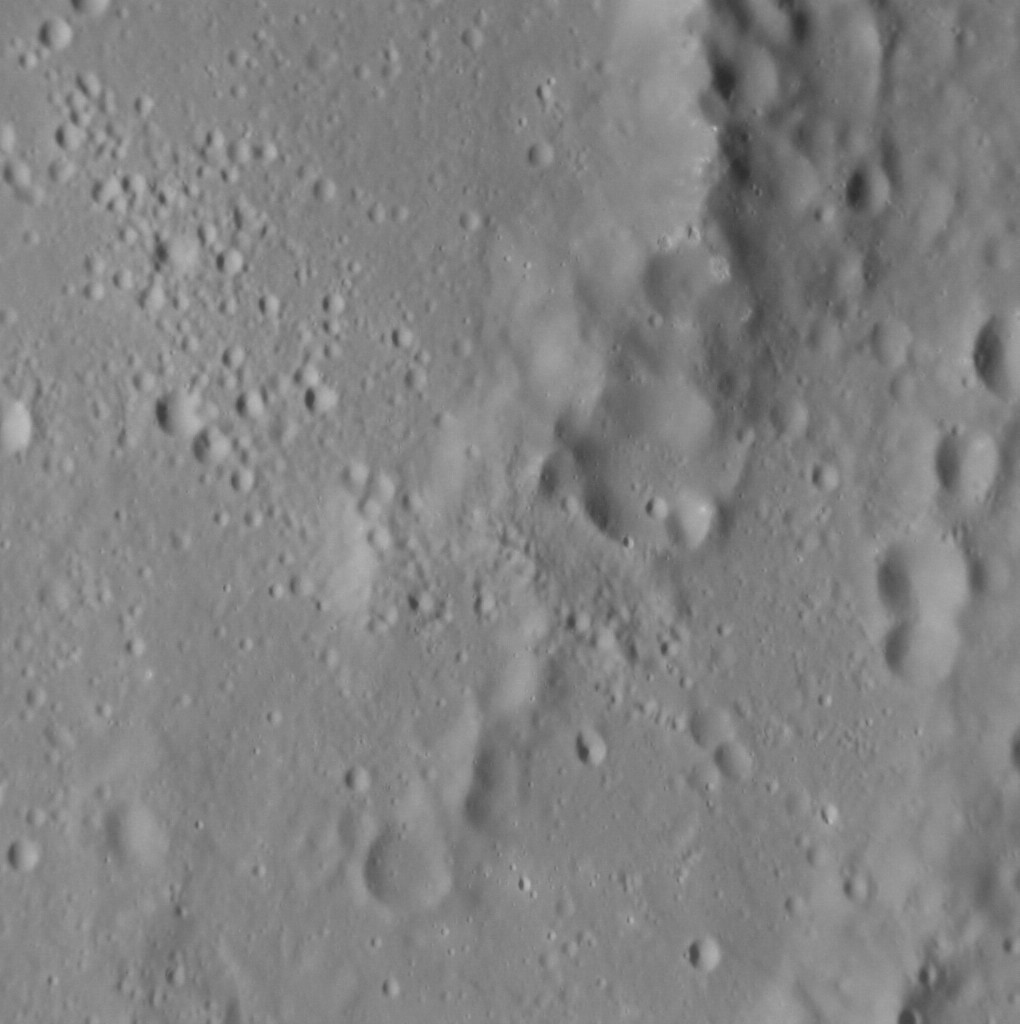
The southeastern peak ring has a lower albedo than the rest of the crater, and there are possible hollows on the peaks.
