= Eminescu (crater) =

Crater on Mercury

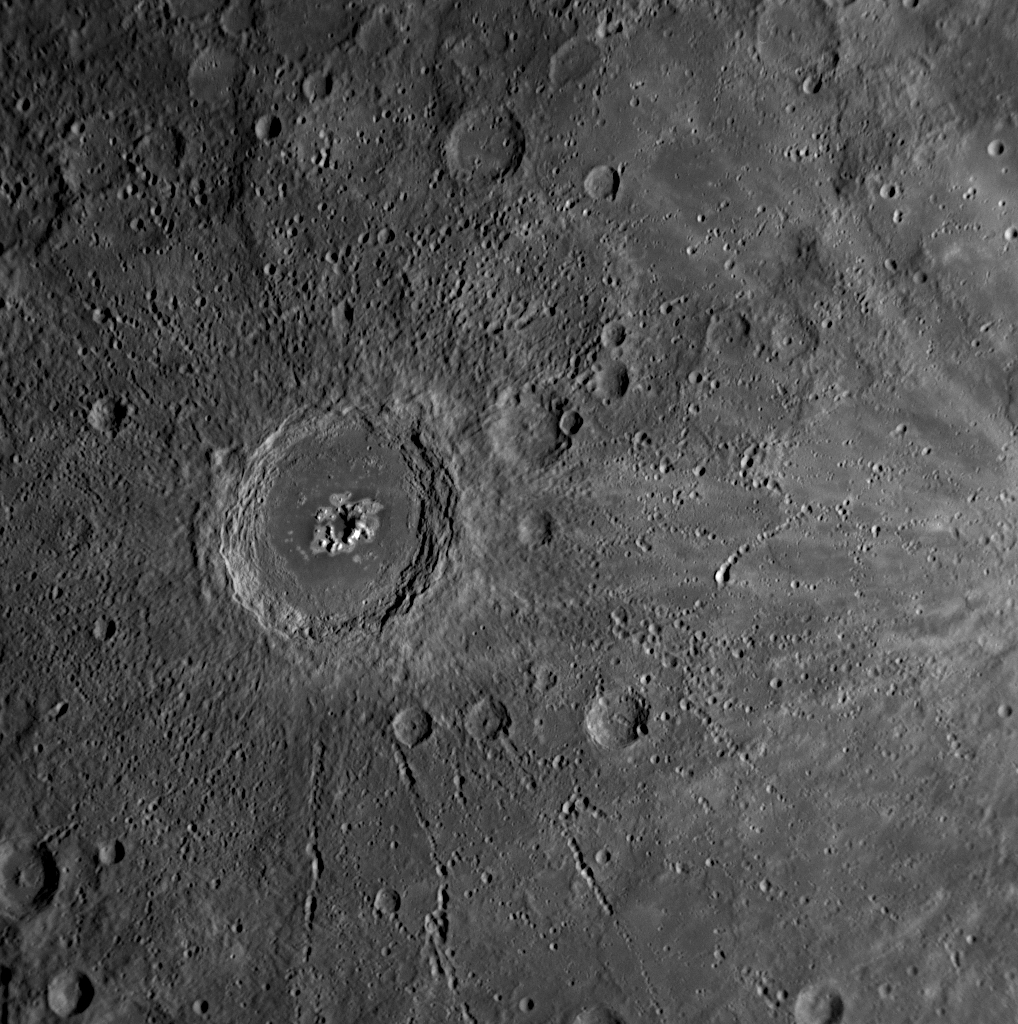
- Eminescu is the prominent crater near the center of this image.
- Feature type: Central-peak impact crater
- Location: Eminescu quadrangle Mercury
- Coordinates: 10.66°N 245.79°W
- Diameter: 129 km (80 mi)
- Eponym: Mihai Eminescu

Eminescu is a peak ring crater on Mercury 125 kilometers (78 mi) in diameter. Since there are very few later craters superposed on it, Eminescu appears to be a young crater formed around one billion years ago. It has a transitional morphology between larger more complex impact basins like Raditladi and smaller simpler central peak craters.

The impact ejecta and chains of secondary craters extend as far as one radius from the rim. There are no bright or dark crater rays, with the crater rim itself being higher in altitude than the surrounding cratered plains. The crater walls are degraded by slumping, forming distinct blocks of material. The crater floor consists of complex structures, including ejecta deposits, impact melts and possibly units placed by effusive volcanism.

The bright bluish central peaks within the crater are arranged in a circular pattern forming a peak ring. The peaks exhibit unusual color characteristics similar to the bright crater floor deposits (BCFD) seen in other craters on Mercury. The crater floor both inside and outside the peak ring is covered by dark smooth plains, which appear to surround it. These plains are probably volcanic in origin. Further from the peak ring near the crater walls, there are areas covered by a bright material. They are subdivided into bright smooth plains in the north-east corner of Eminescu, and mottled and rough terrain elsewhere. The bright units were originally thought to be impact melts, but exhibit the characteristics of landforms known as hollows. A confirmed dark spot is present in Eminescu, at the southwestern peak ring. This dark spot is associated with the hollows.

The crater is named after Mihai Eminescu, a Romanian poet (1850–1889).

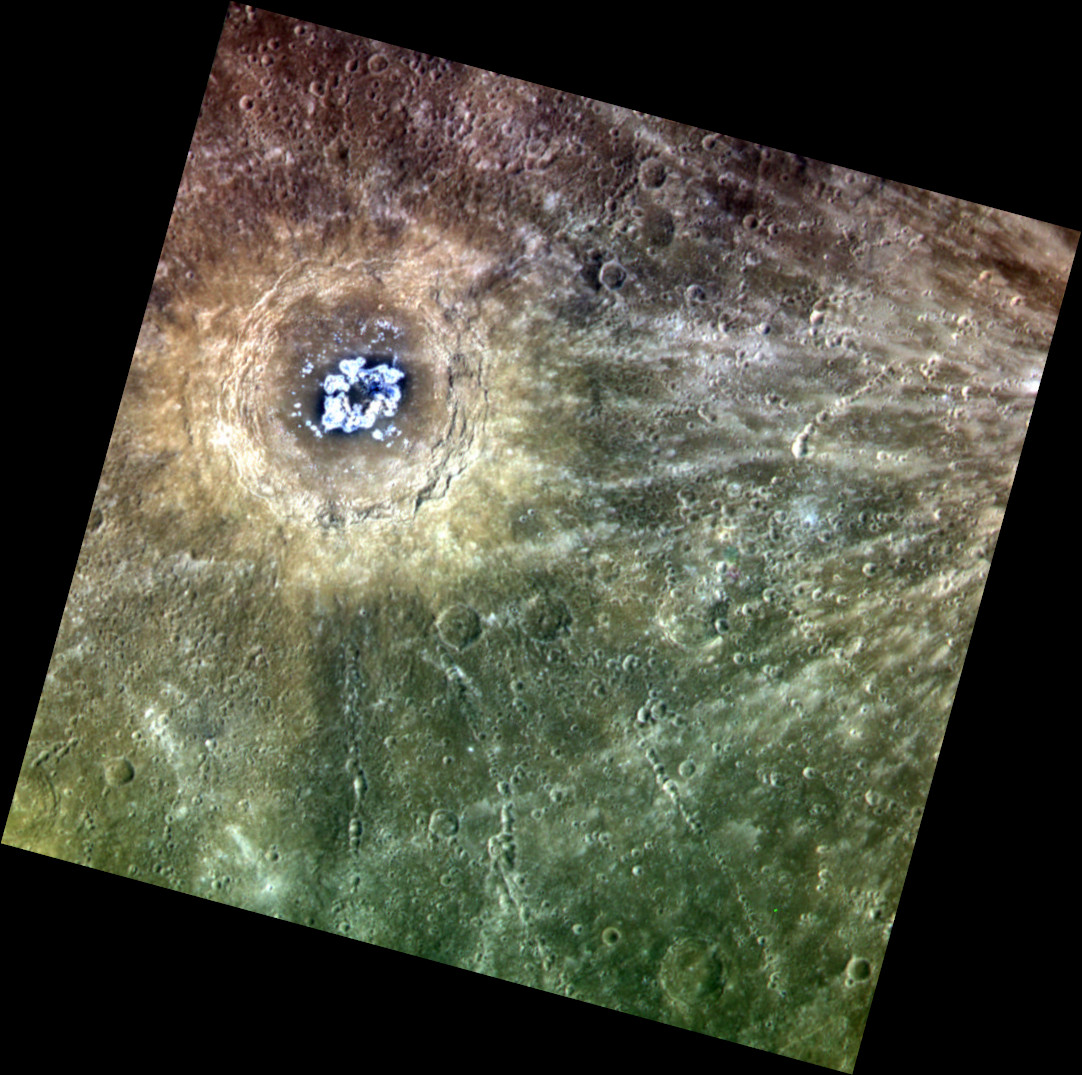
Exaggerated color view of Eminescu

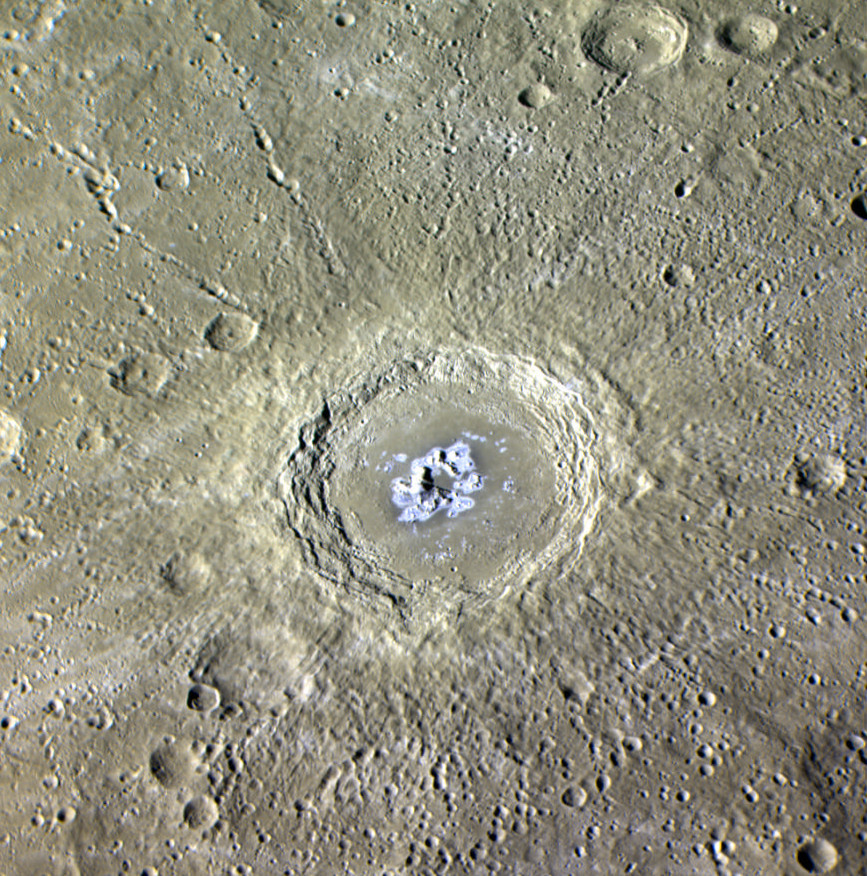
Oblique color view

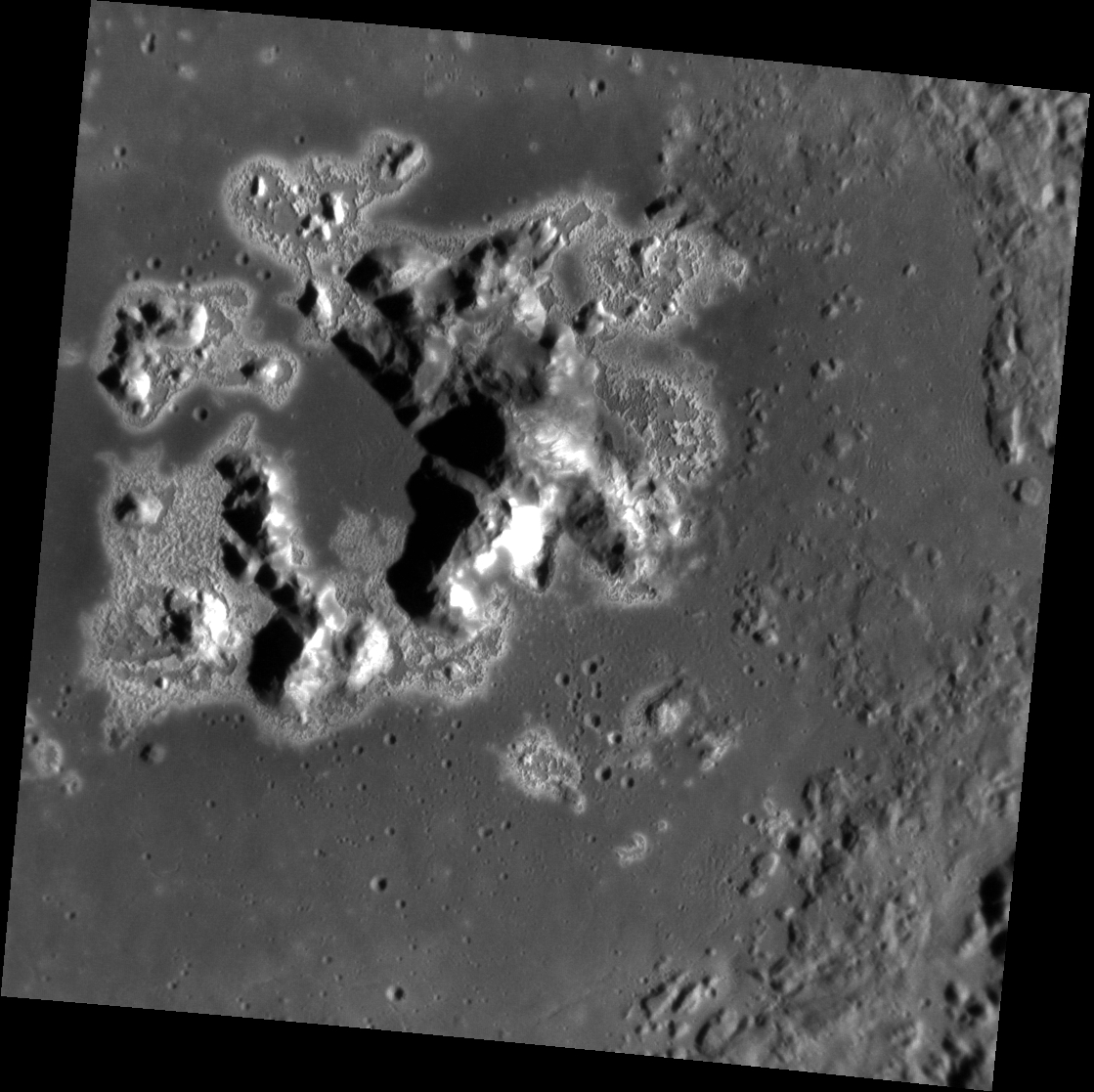
The central peak complex of Eminescu is surrounded by hollows
