= Beagle Rupes =

Long, high cliff on Mercury

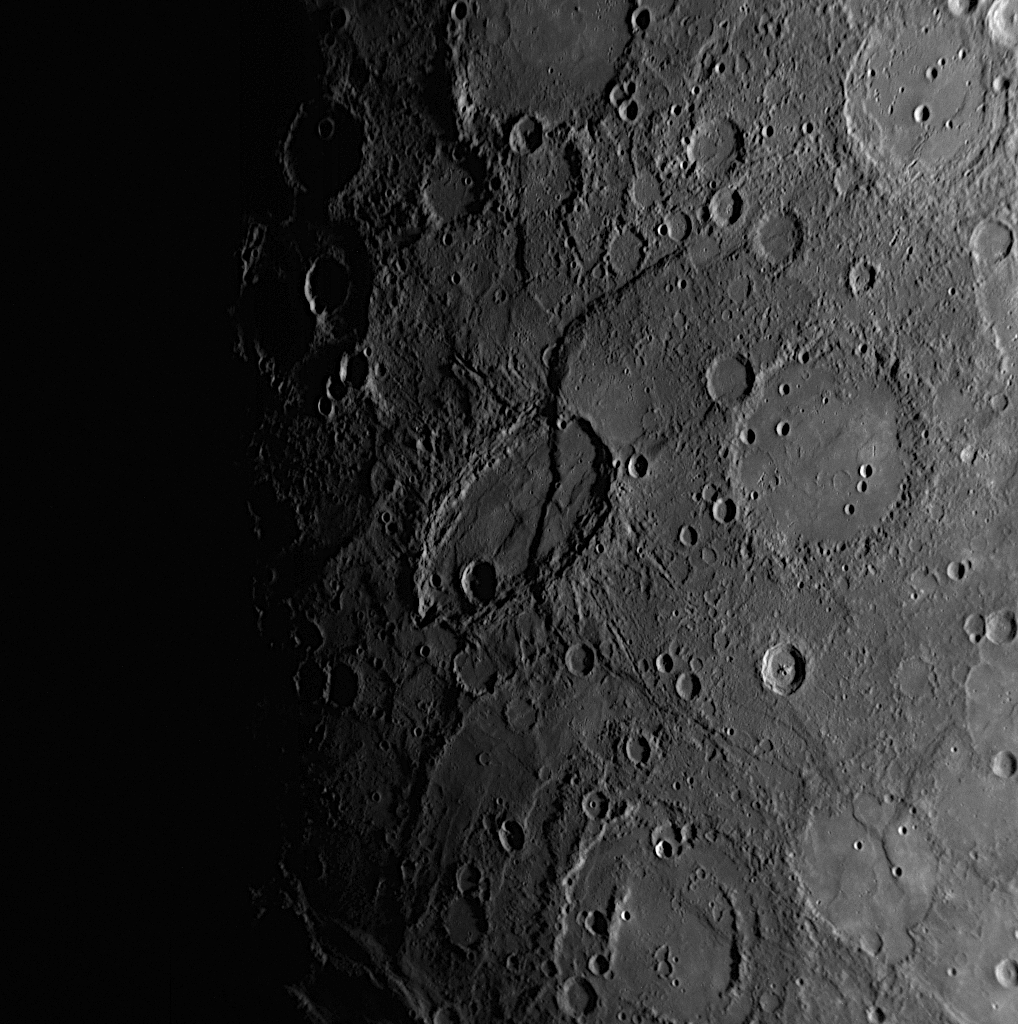
- Feature type: Rupes
- Coordinates: 3.22°S 259.24°W
- Length: 600 km
- Eponym: HMS Beagle

Beagle Rupes is an escarpment on Mercury, one of the highest and longest yet seen. It was discovered in 2008 when MESSENGER made its first flyby of the planet. It has an arcuate shape and is about 600 kilometres (370 mi) long. The scarp is a surface manifestation of a thrust fault, which formed when the planet contracted as its interior cooled.

Beagle Rupes consists of three segments. The central segment trends in the north–south direction and crosscuts the elliptically shaped Sveinsdóttir crater. The dimensions of the latter are 220 km × 120 km (137 mi × 75 mi). The floor of Sveinsdóttir was flooded by the smooth plains material and deformed by wrinkle-ridges before the appearance of Beagle Rupes. The maximum relief within the crater is about 0.8 km (0.5 mi). To the south of Sveinsdóttir the scarp turns to the southeast. A 27 km-diameter (17 mi) crater is superposed on this segment. To the north of Sveinsdóttir the scarp turns to northeast completing a large arc. This segment of Beagle Rupes crosscuts and deforms a small 17 km-diameter (11 mi) crater. The relief in this places reaches 1.5 km (0.9 mi). The scarp appears to be a young feature, which postdates the emplacement of the smooth plans and formation of the majority of impact craters.

Beagle Rupes is named after HMS Beagle, a ship made famous through association with Charles Darwin. The name was adopted by the International Astronomical Union on 8 April 2008.

== See also ==
- List of escarpments
