= Firdousi (crater) =

Crater on Mercury

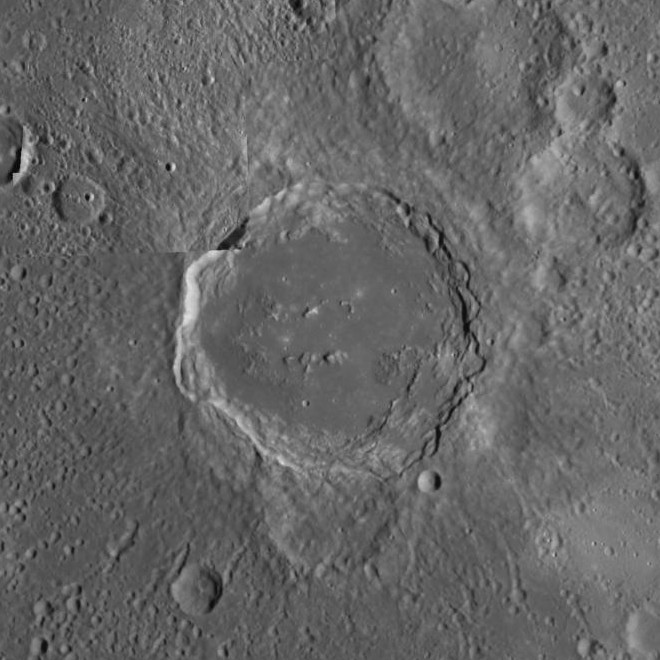
- MESSENGER WAC mosaic
- Feature type: Impact crater
- Location: Derain quadrangle, Mercury
- Coordinates: 3.47°N 294.68°W
- Diameter: 98 km (61 mi)
- Eponym: Hakim Ferdowsi

Firdousi is a crater on Mercury. It has a diameter of 98 km (61 mi). Its name was adopted by the International Astronomical Union (IAU) in 2010. Firdousi is named for the Persian poet Ferdowsi, who lived from 940 to 1020.

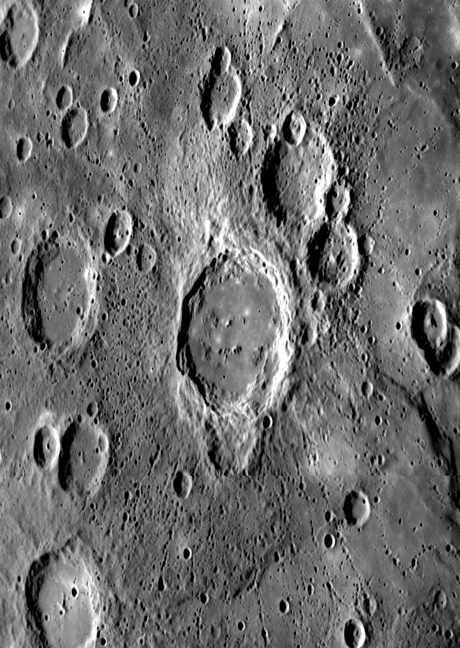
Firdousi from MESSENGER's third flyby in September 2009

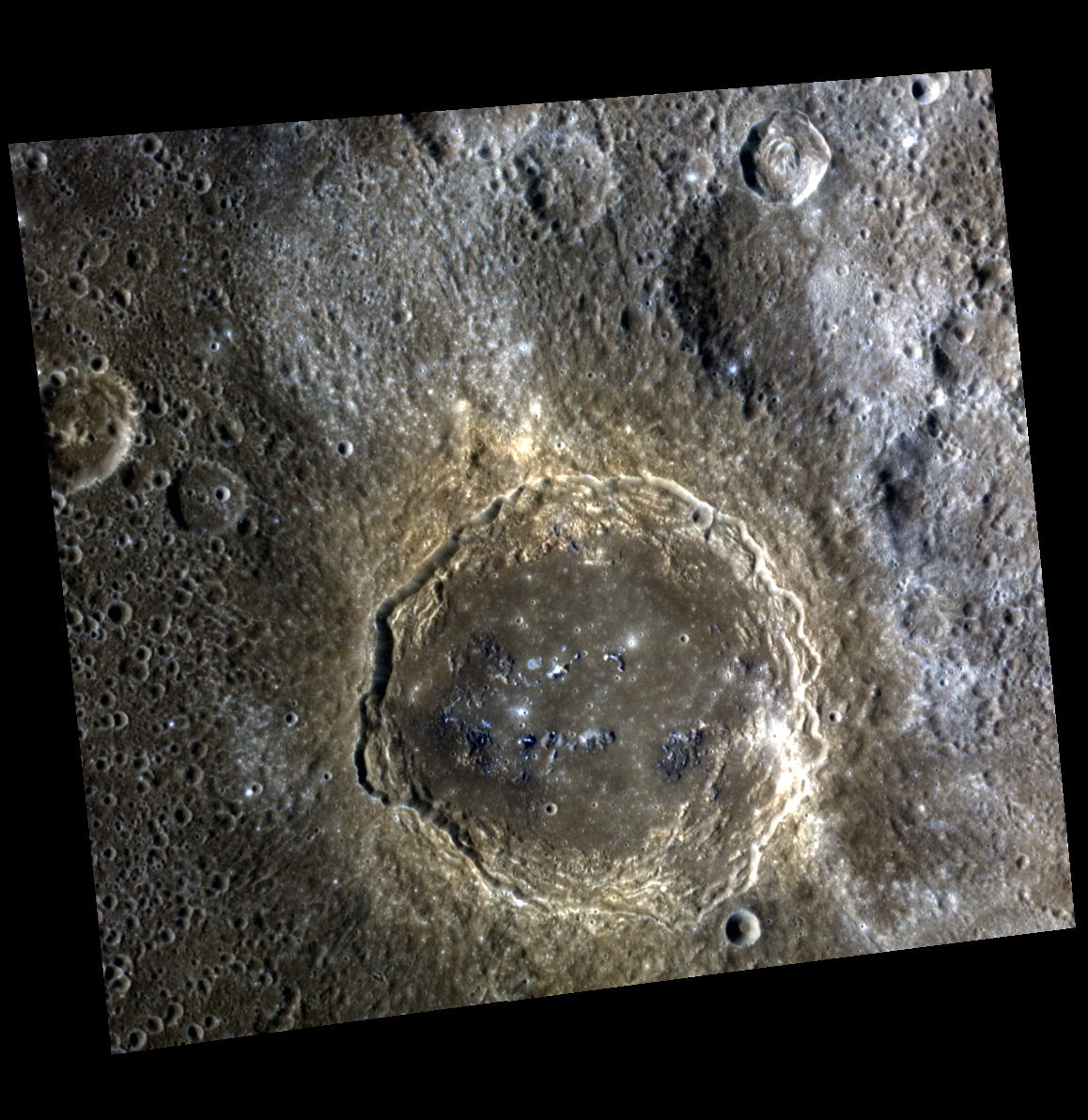
Approximate color image (map projected)

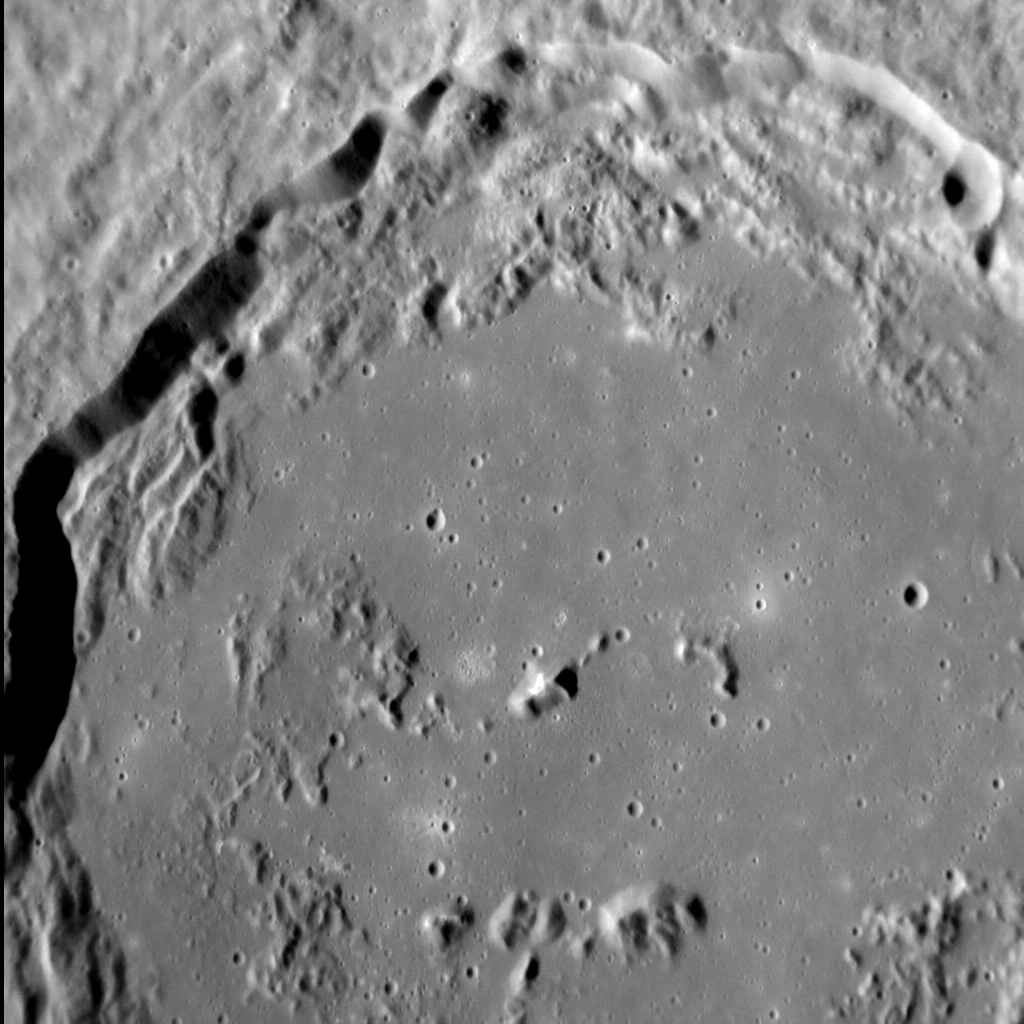
Firdousi crater, showing hollows in the interior
