= Caravaggio (crater) =

Crater on Mercury

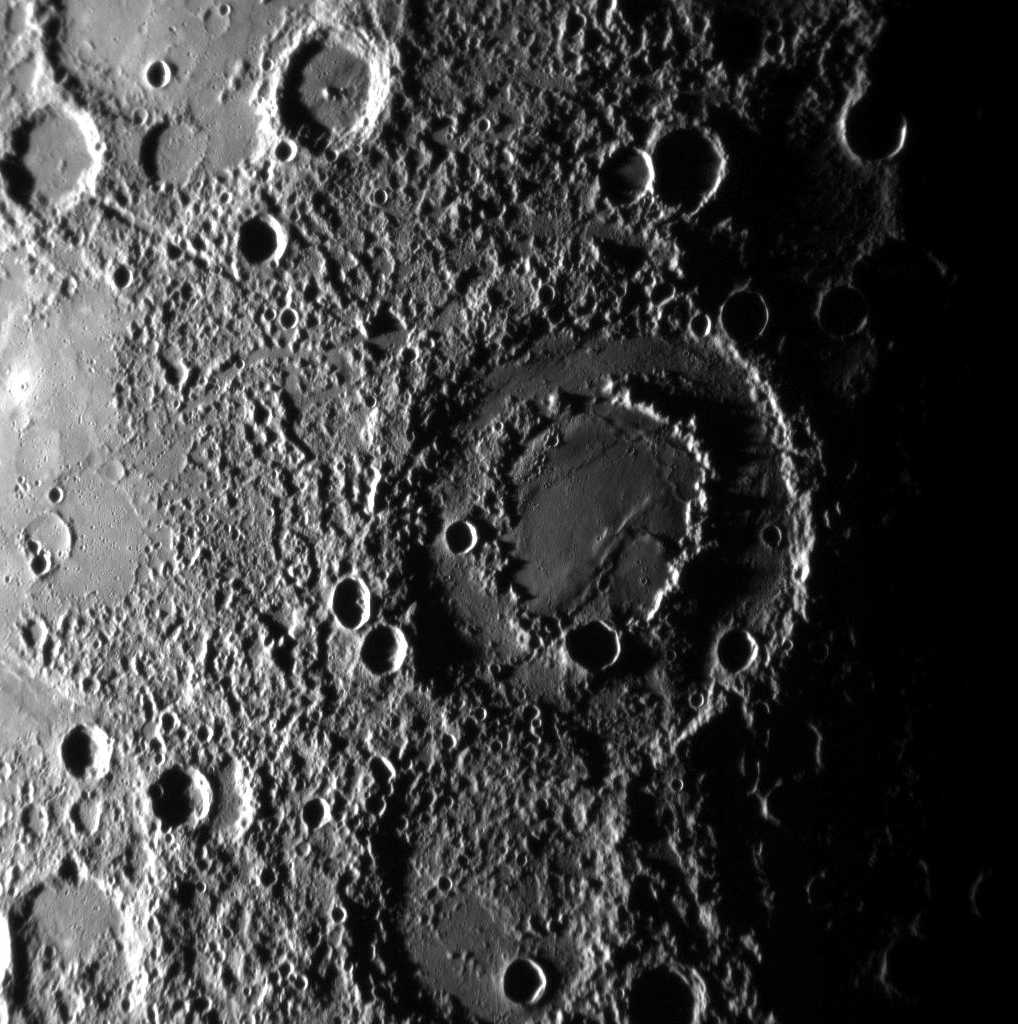
- MESSENGER NAC image, acquired on third flyby in September 2009
- Feature type: Peak-ring impact basin
- Location: Eminescu quadrangle, Mercury
- Coordinates: 3.18°N 272.76°W
- Diameter: 185 km
- Eponym: Michelangelo Merisi Caravaggio

Caravaggio is a large crater on Mercury. The crater was named after the Italian painter Caravaggio by the IAU in 2013.

Caravaggio is one of 110 peak ring basins on Mercury.

The scarps Blossom Rupes cut across the southern rim of Caravaggio and extend to the southeast a further 400 km to the crater Savage.

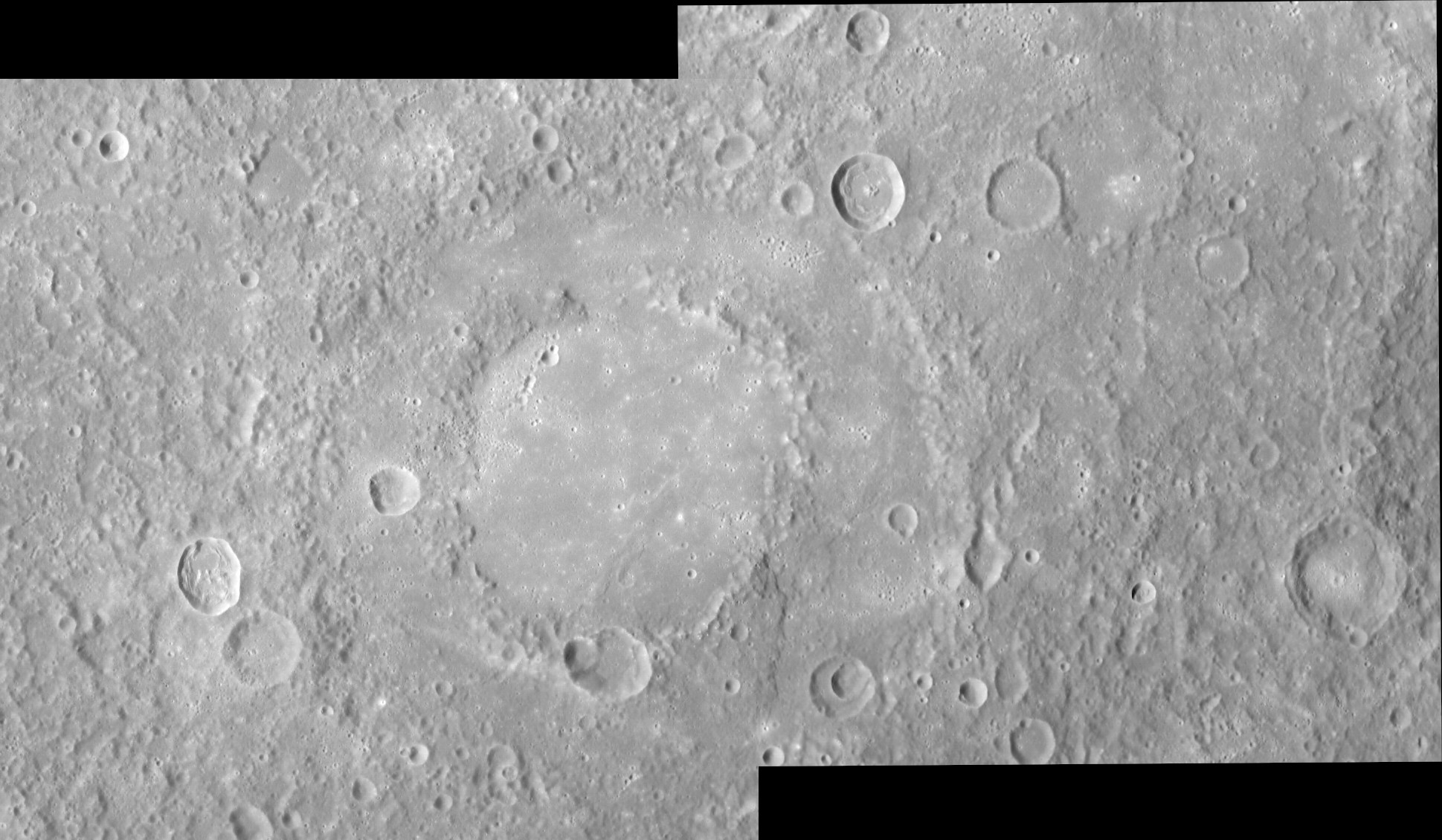
WAC mosaic

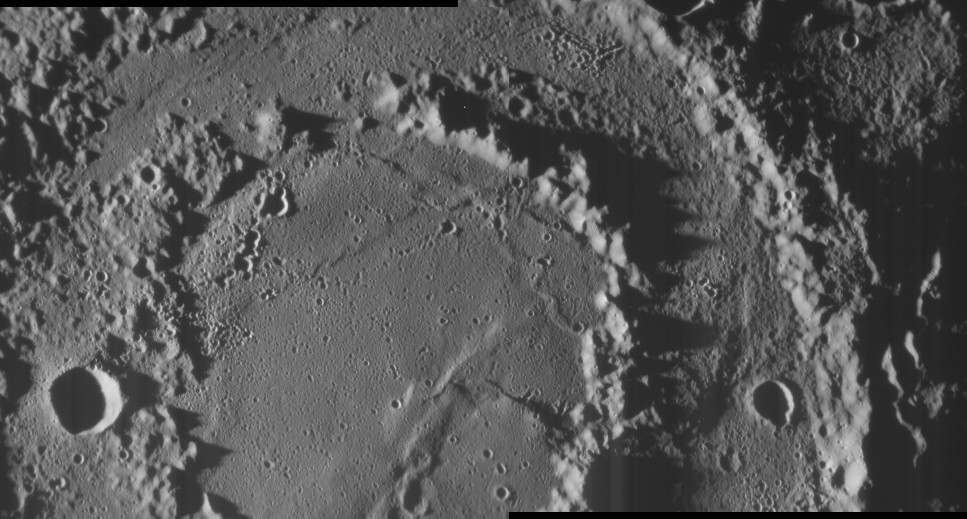
NAC mosaic at low sun angle

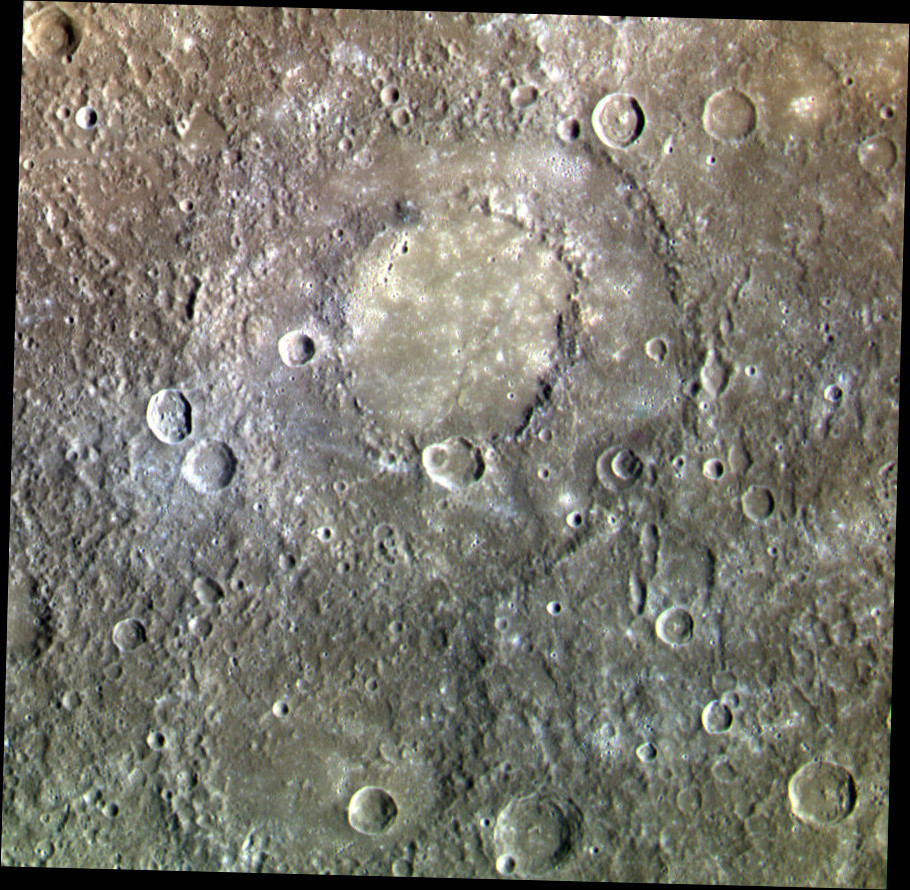
Approximate color image
