= Eminescu quadrangle =

Quadrangle on Mercury

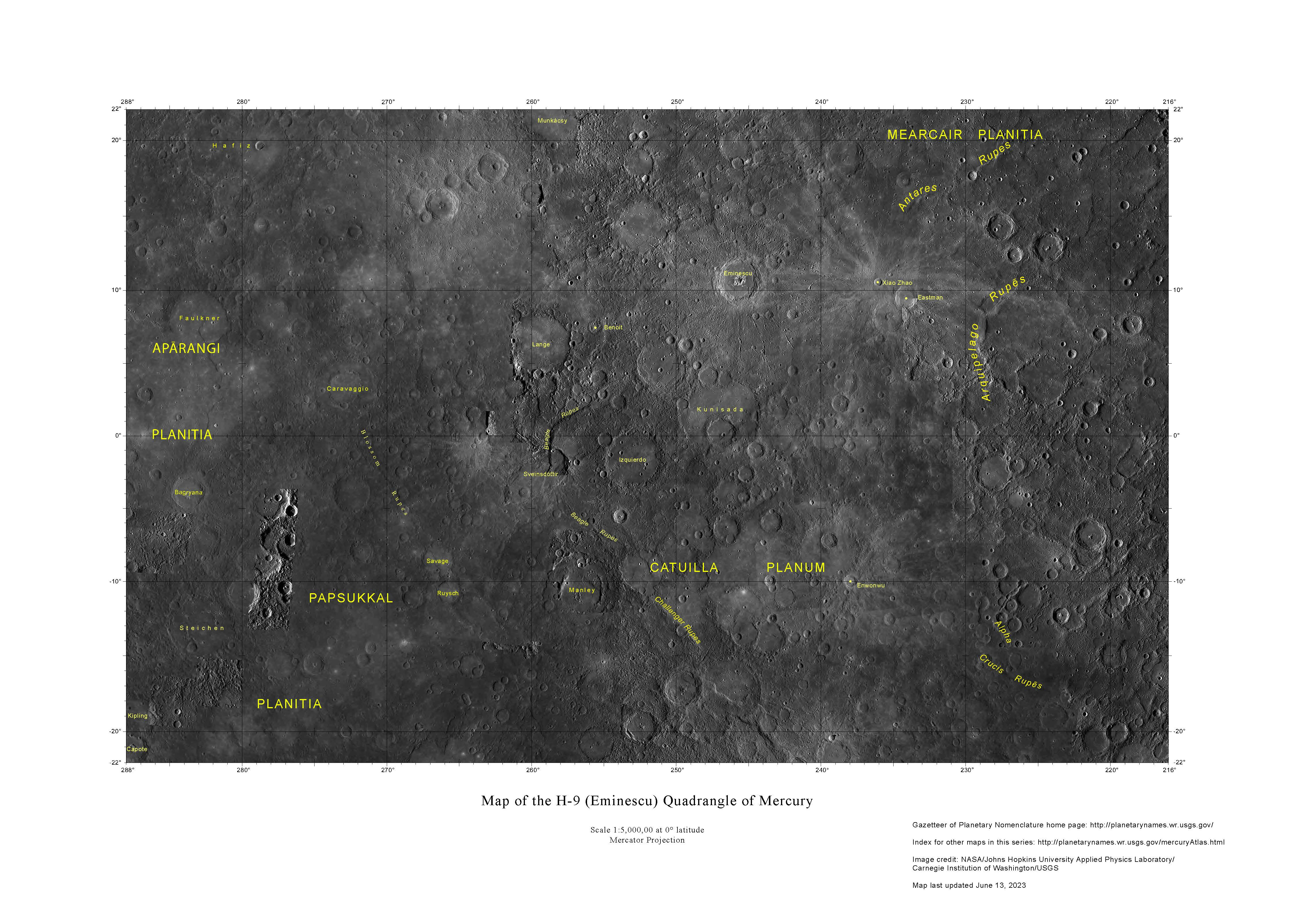
Eminescu quadrangle as mapped by the MESSENGER spacecraft

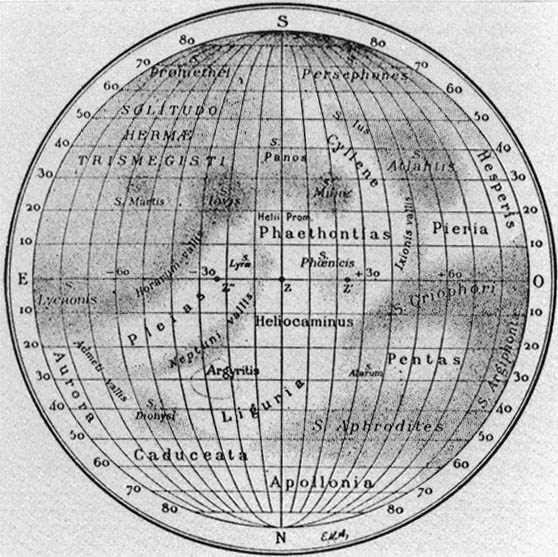
1934 map showing the Solitudo Criophori albedo feature

The Eminescu quadrangle (H-9) is one of fifteen quadrangles on Mercury. It runs from 216 to 288° longitude and from -25 to 25° latitude. Named after the Eminescu crater, it was mapped in detail for the first time after MESSENGER entered orbit around Mercury in 2011. It had not been mapped prior to that point because it was one of the six quadrangles that was not illuminated when Mariner 10 made its flybys in 1974 and 1975. These six quadrangles continued to be known by their albedo feature names, with this one known as the Solitudo Criophori quadrangle.

An unnamed, highly modified impact basin is thought to exist to the southwest of the Caloris basin (at 6.5° N, 134.8° E). The basin is referred to as b40 in scientific literature and it is primarily recognized on the basis of a ring-shaped set of wrinkle ridges with a diameter of 310 kilometers. The western rim of this basin is named Arquipelago Rupes.

Derain quadrangle is to the west of Eminescu quadrangle, and Tolstoj quadrangle is to the east. Hokusai quadrangle and Raditladi quadrangle are to the northwest and northeast, and Debussy quadrangle and Neruda quadrangle are to the southwest and southeast.

== Major Features ==
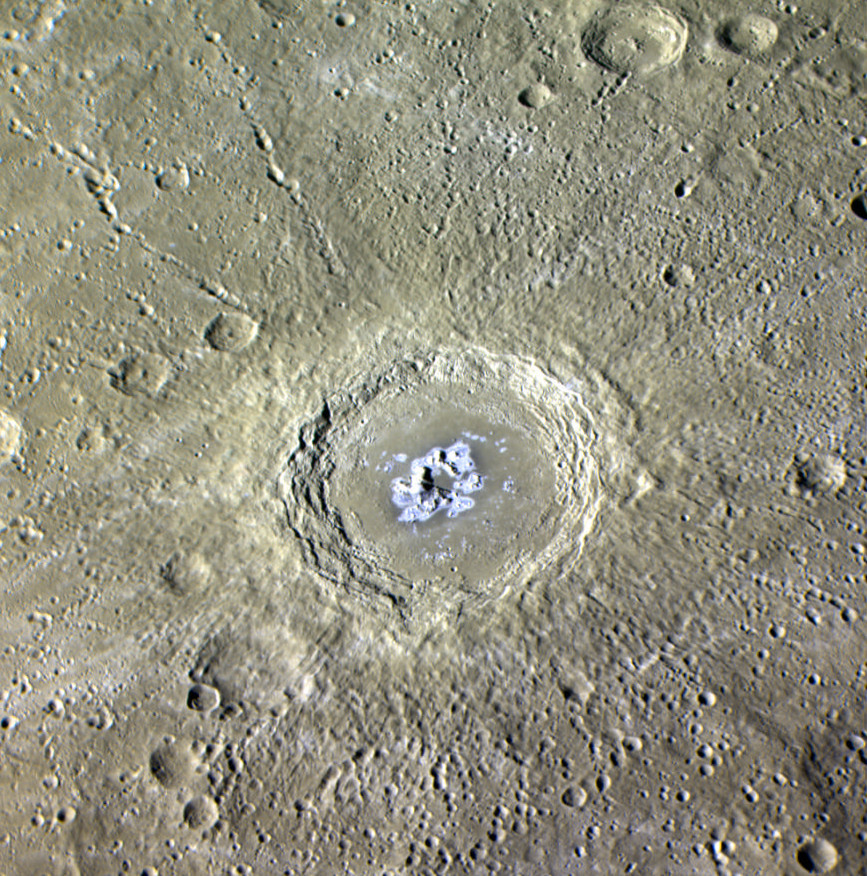
Exaggerated color view of Eminescu crater

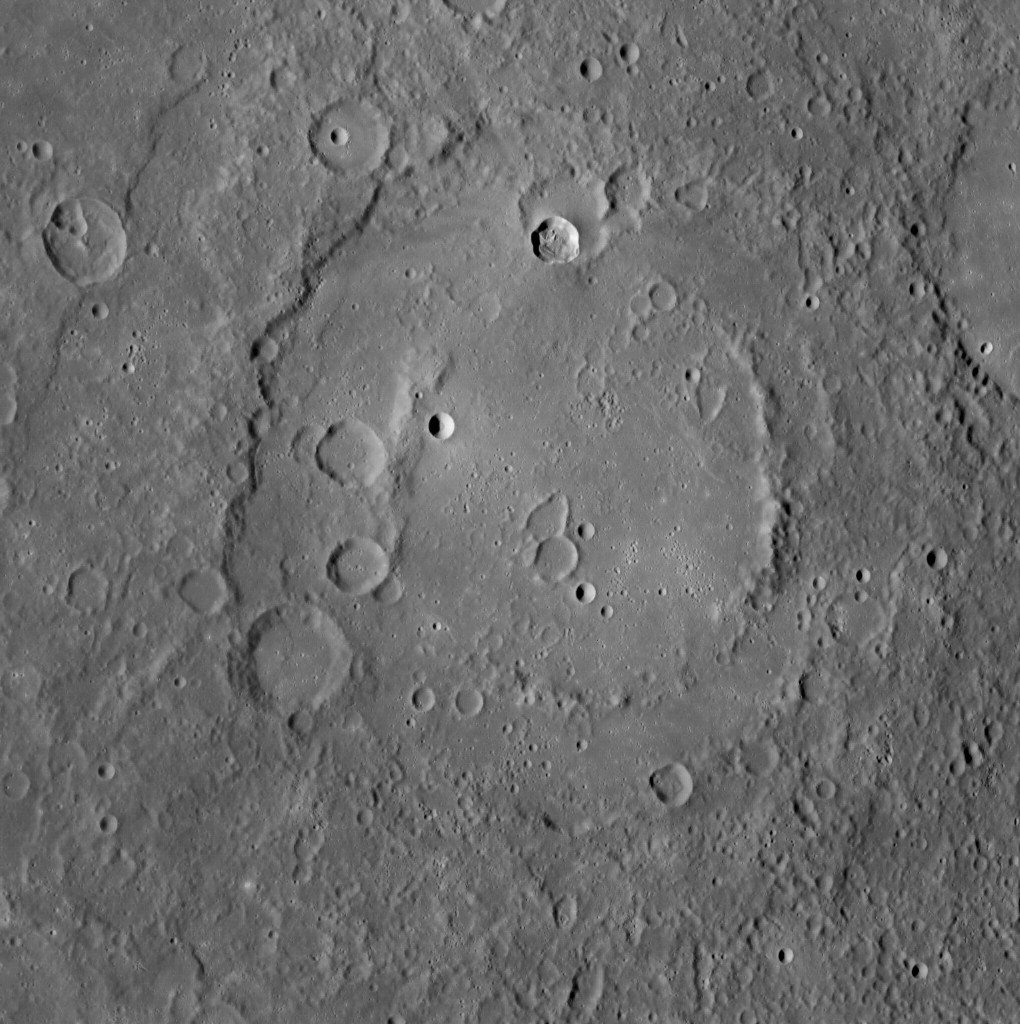
Manley crater

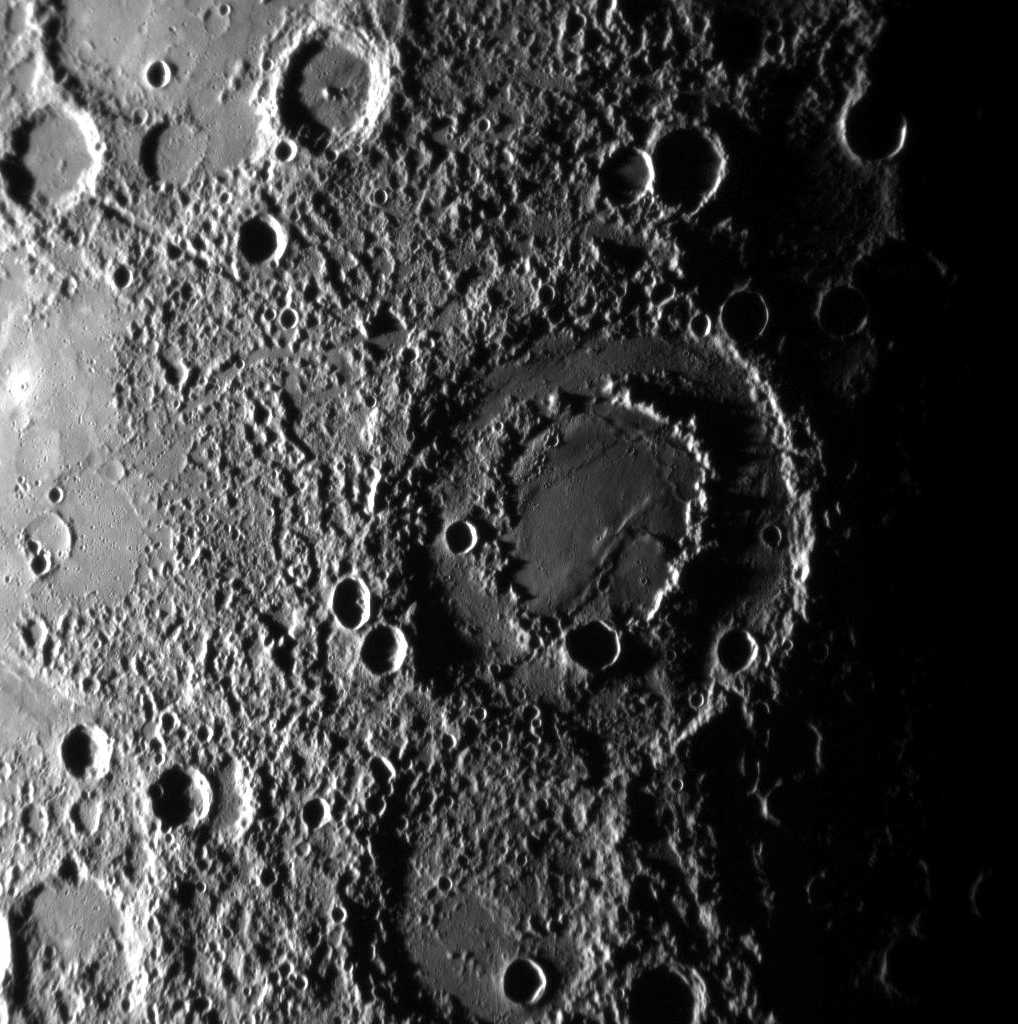
Caravaggio crater

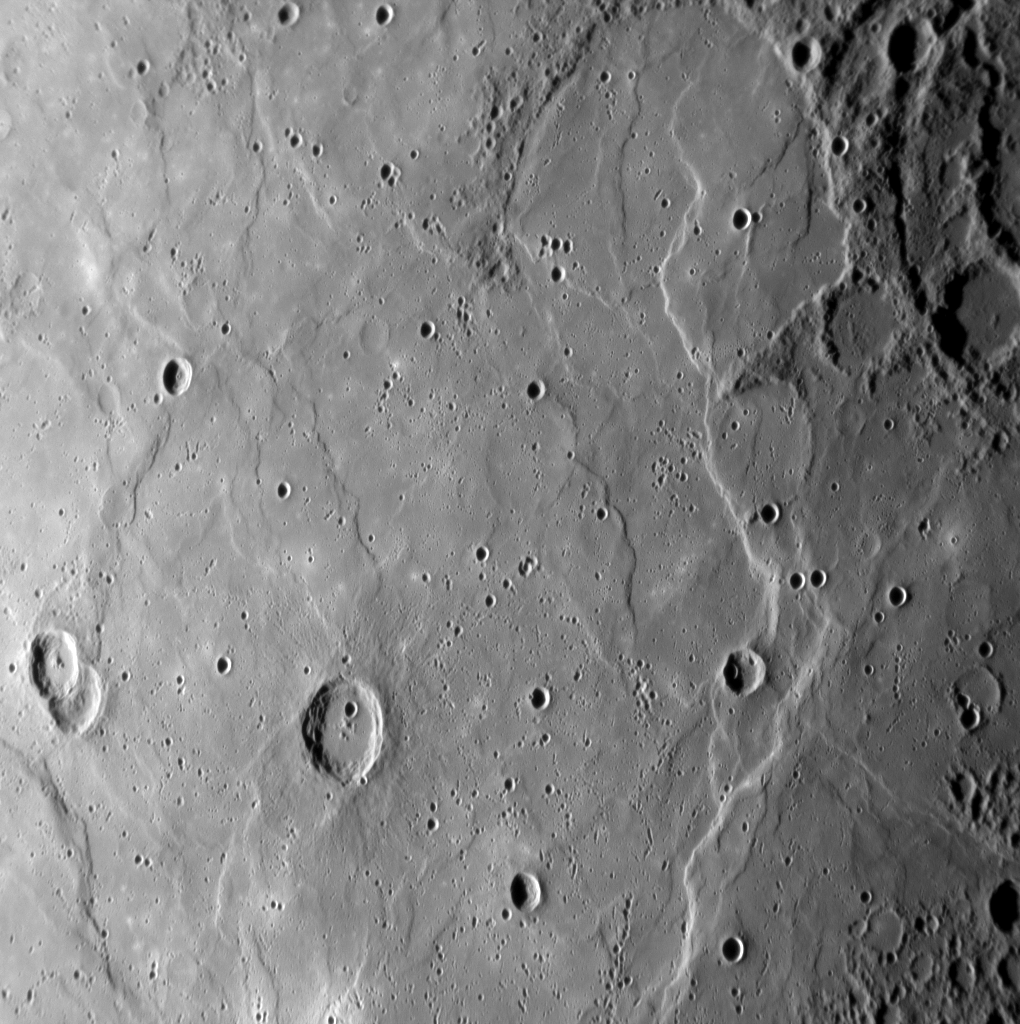
Apārangi Planitia and Faulkner crater

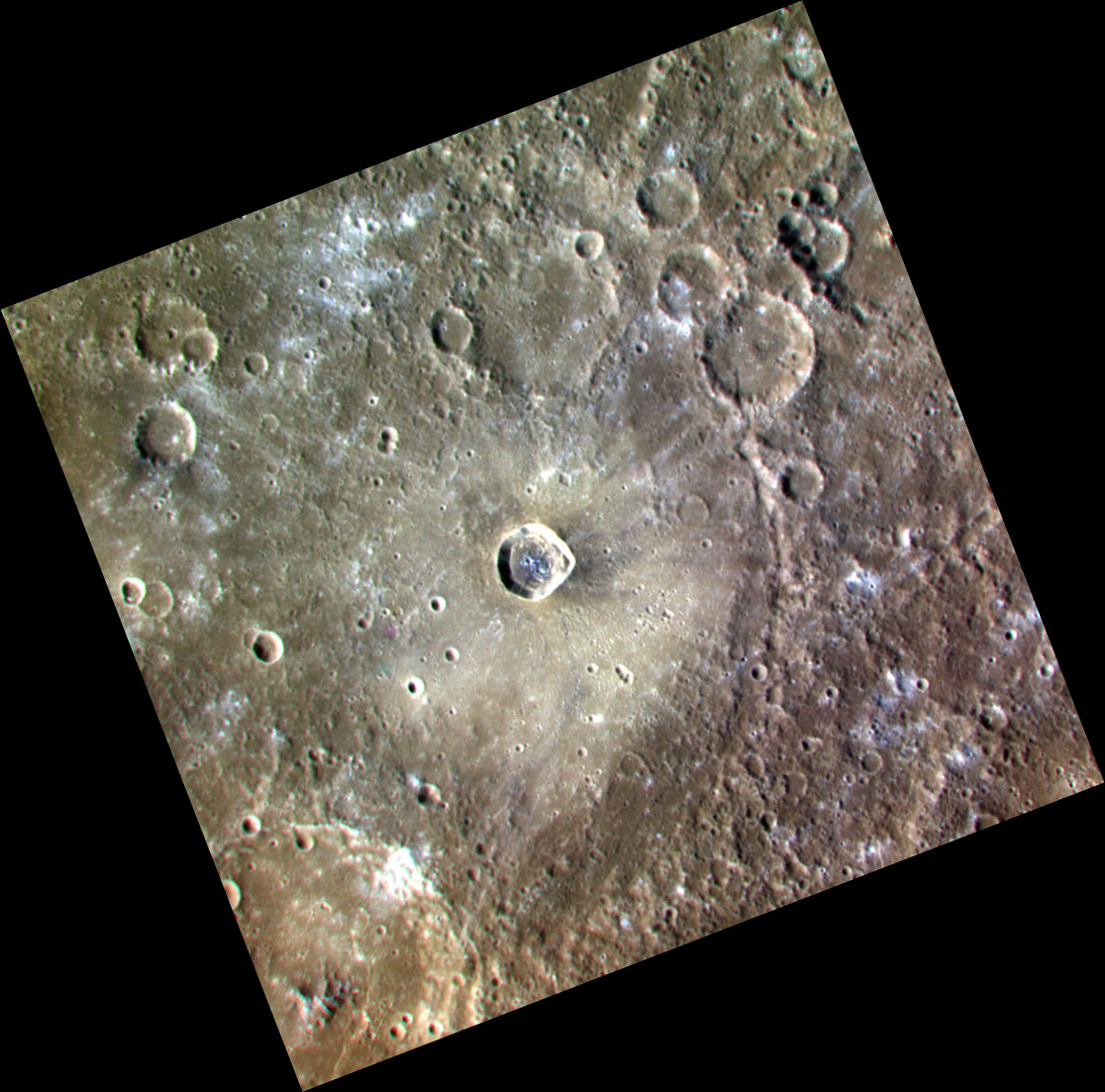
Exaggerated color view of Hafiz crater with unnamed dark crater near center

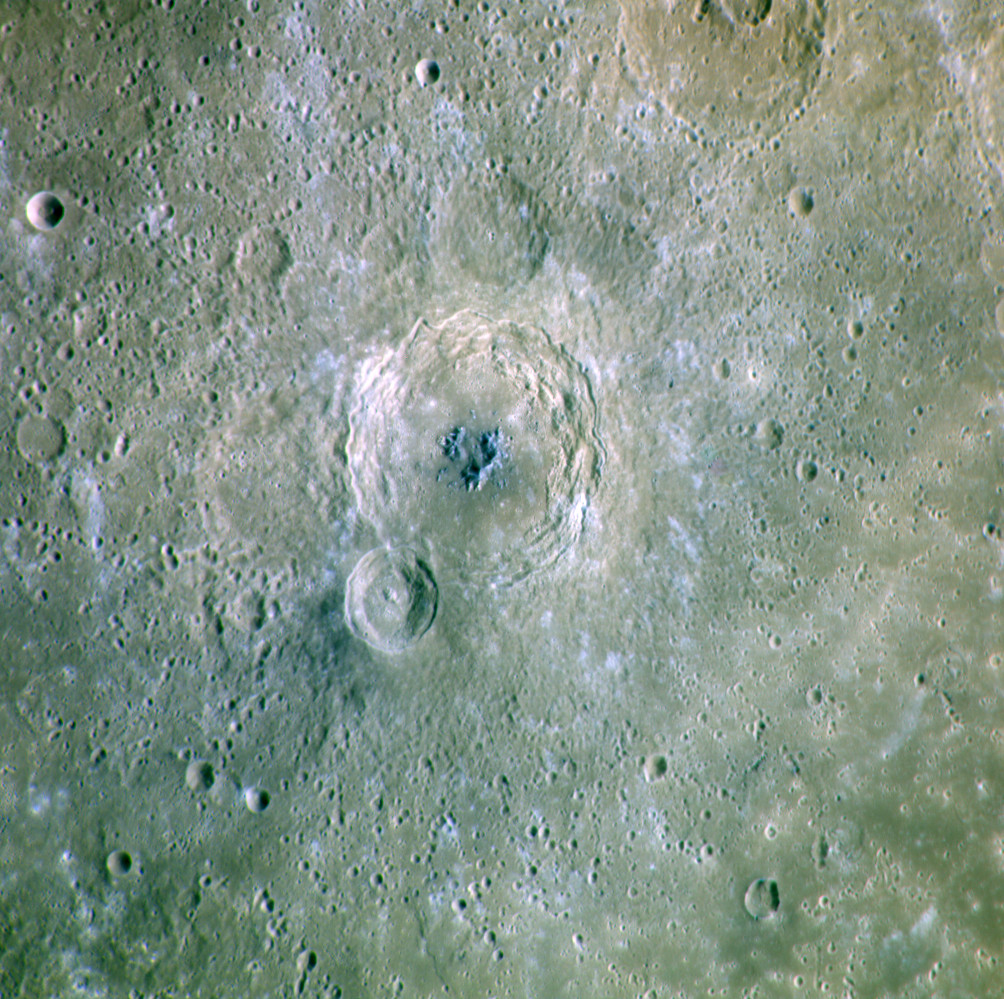
Guinness crater with prominent central peak that is a dark spot

H-1 Borealis (features)
H-5 Hokusai (features)	H-4 Raditladi (features)	H-3 Shakespeare (features)		H-2 Victoria (features)
H-10 Derain (features)	H-9 Eminescu (features)	H-8 Tolstoj (features)	H-7 Beethoven (features)	H-6 Kuiper (features)
H-14 Debussy (features)	H-13 Neruda (features)	H-12 Michelangelo (features)		H-11 Discovery (features)
H-15 Bach (features)
