= Nabokov (crater) =

Crater on Mercury

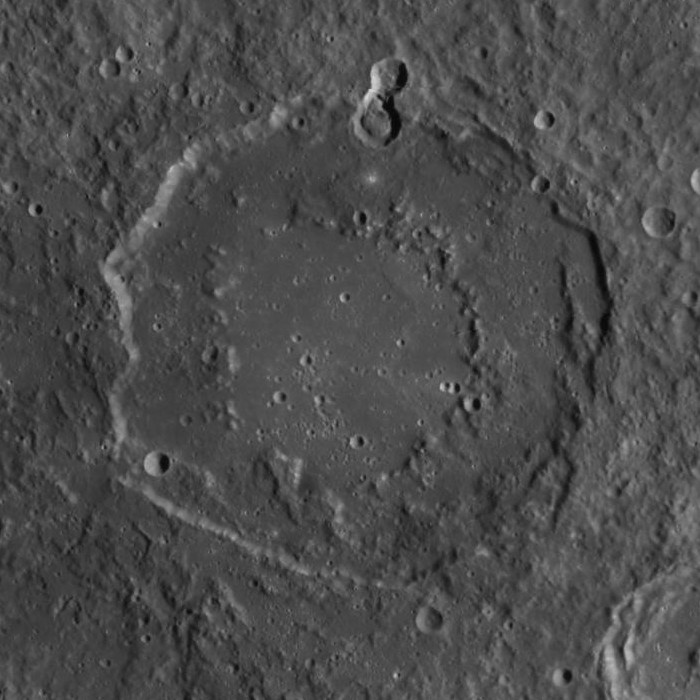
- MESSENGER WAC mosaic of Nabokov
- Feature type: Peak-ring impact basin
- Location: Derain quadrangle, Mercury
- Coordinates: 14.56°S 55.76°E
- Diameter: 166 km (103 mi)
- Eponym: Vladimir Nabokov

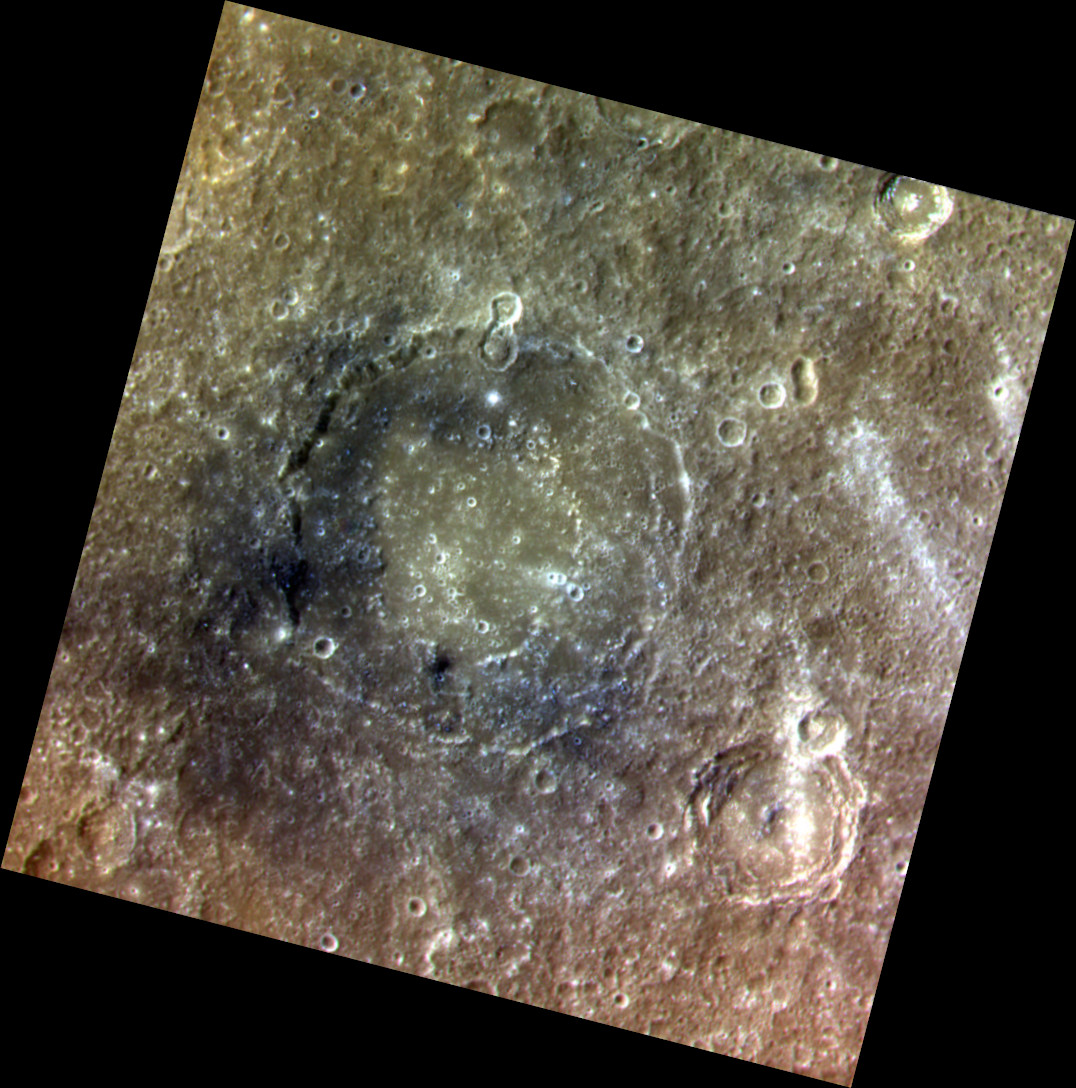
Enhanced color image of Nabokov

Nabokov is a crater on Mercury. Its name was adopted by the International Astronomical Union (IAU) on April 24, 2012. Nabokov is named for the Russian and American author Vladimir Nabokov.

Nabokov is one of 110 peak ring basins on Mercury. To the west is another peak-ring basin, Holst, of similar size. To the north of Nabokov is Martins crater, and to the northeast is Barney. Nabokov lies on the east side of the ancient Lennon-Picasso Basin. About 137 km to the northeast of Barney is the highest point on Mercury (over 4 km above the global average), the highest part of scarps that are remnants of the rim of the Lennon-Picasso Basin.
