= Barney (crater) =

Crater on Mercury

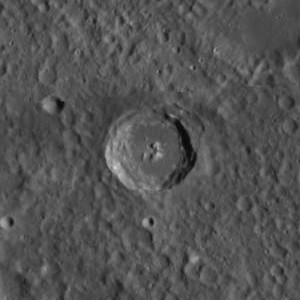
- MESSENGER WAC mosaic of Barney
- Feature type: Central-peak impact crater
- Location: Derain quadrangle, Mercury
- Coordinates: 11.69°S 300.29°W
- Diameter: 29 km (18 mi)
- Eponym: Natalie Clifford Barney

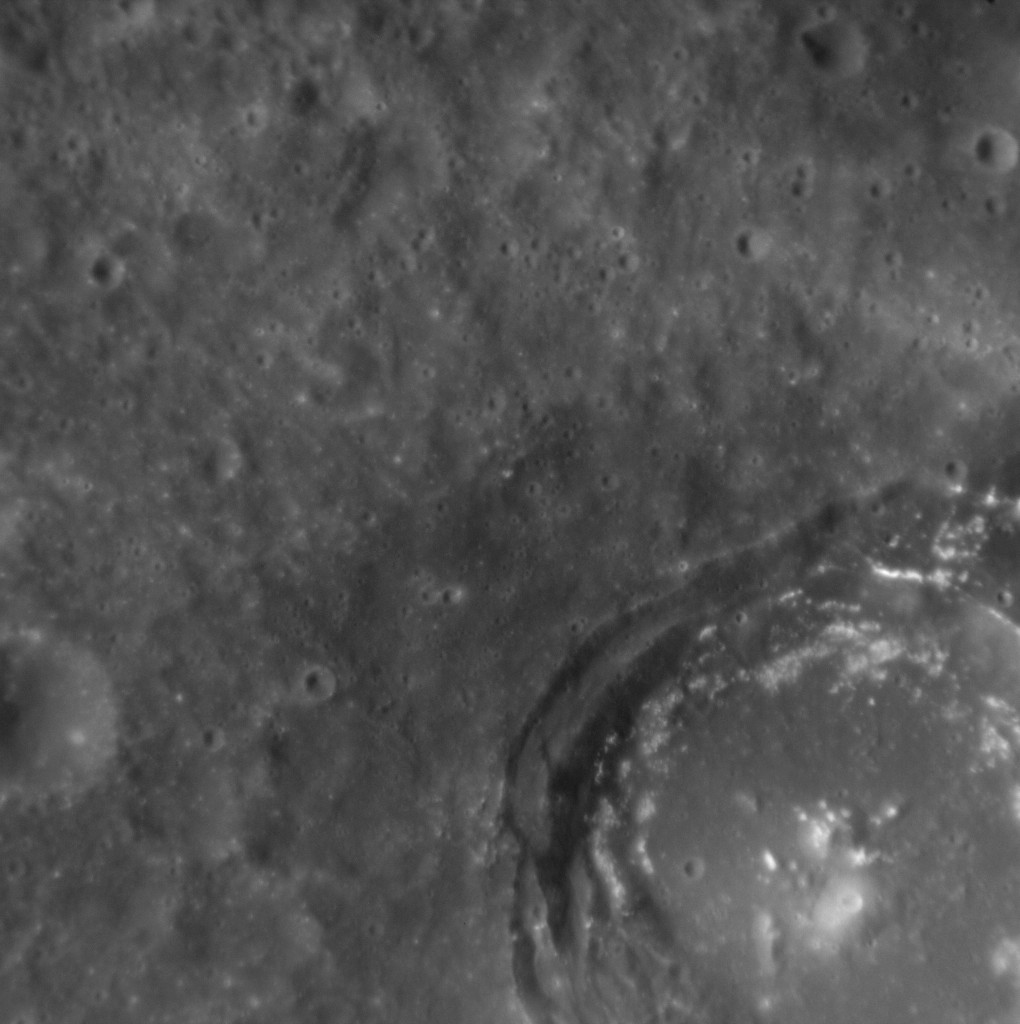
Barney crater in lower right, showing bright areas

Barney is a small crater on Mercury. Its name was adopted by the International Astronomical Union (IAU) in 2013. Barney is named for the American-French playwright, poet, and novelist Natalie Clifford Barney.

Barney lies on the east side of the ancient Lennon-Picasso Basin. About 137 km to the northeast of Barney is the highest point on Mercury (over 4 km above the global average), the highest part of scarps that are remnants of the rim of the Lennon-Picasso Basin.
