= Ellington (crater) =

Crater on Mercury

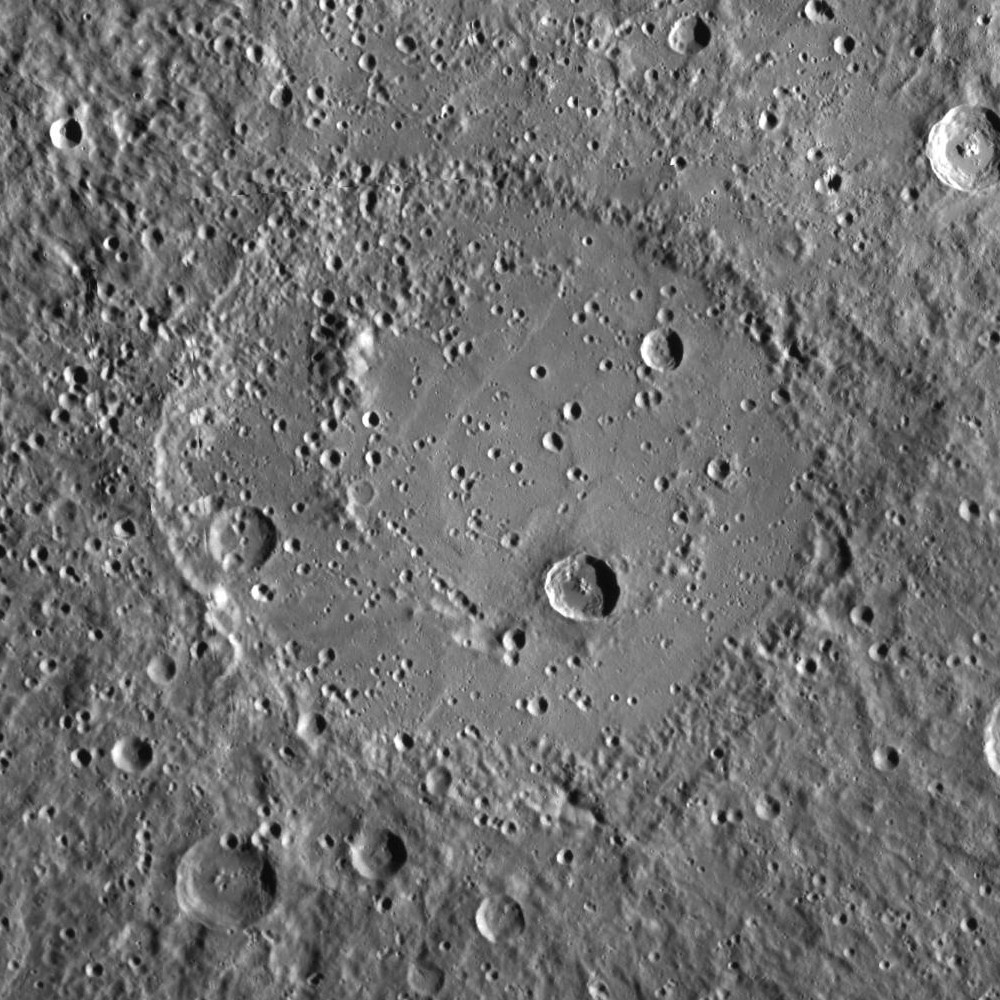
- MESSENGER WAC mosaic of Ellington
- Feature type: Peak-ring impact basin
- Location: Derain quadrangle, Mercury
- Coordinates: 12.88°S 333.9°W
- Diameter: 216 km
- Eponym: Duke Ellington

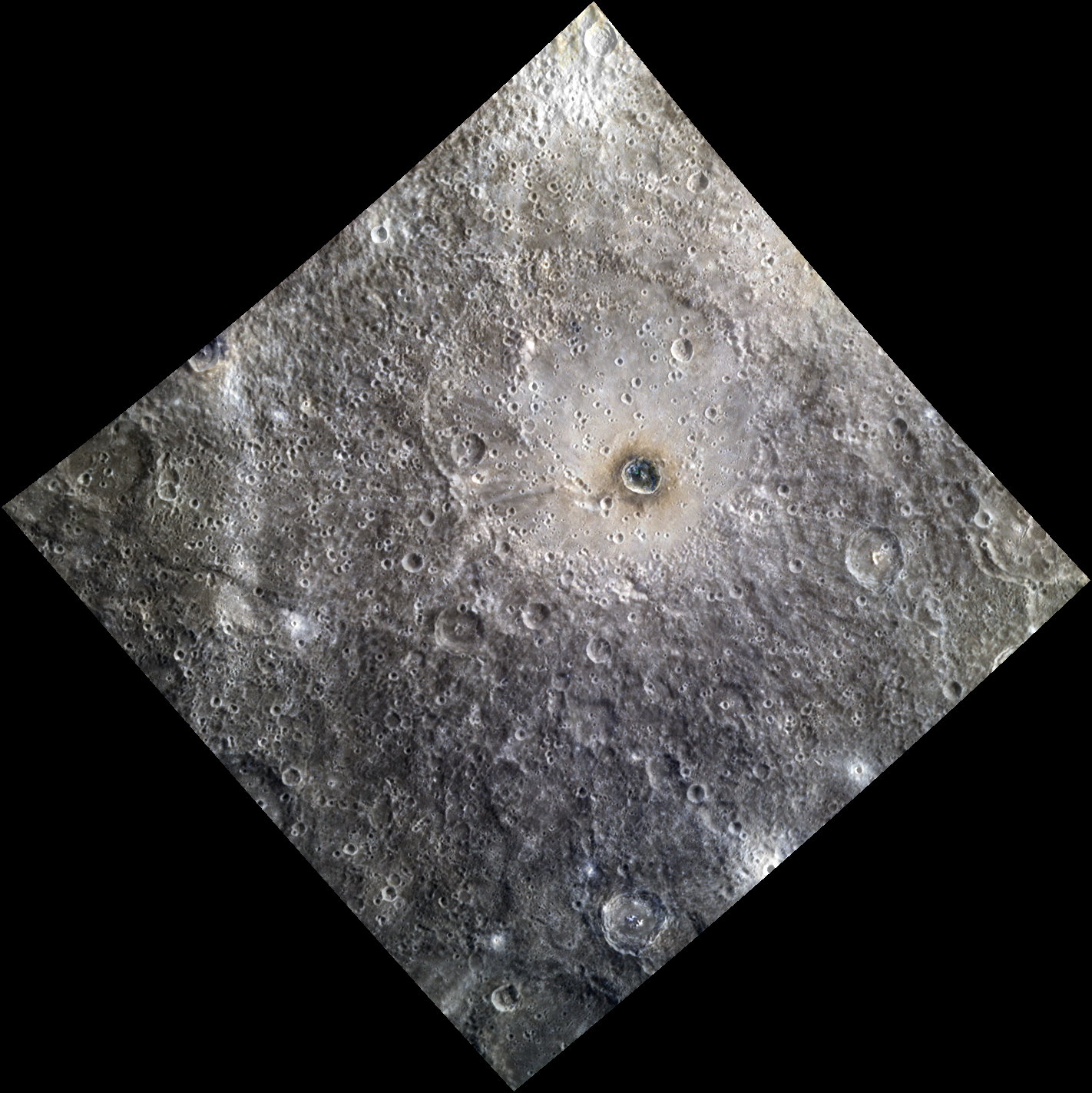
Approximate color image of Ellington and vicinity, with the prominent Berkel above center

Ellington is a crater on Mercury named after Duke Ellington, an American composer, pianist, and leader of a jazz orchestra. It was named by the IAU in 2012.

Ellington is one of 110 peak ring basins on Mercury.

Within Ellington is the smaller crater Berkel. The somewhat smaller crater Derain is to the northwest. Both Derain and Ellington lie within a much older, 730-km-diameter, unnamed crater (referred to as b36). The crater Nasir is to the south of Ellington.
