= Nasir (crater) =

Crater on Mercury

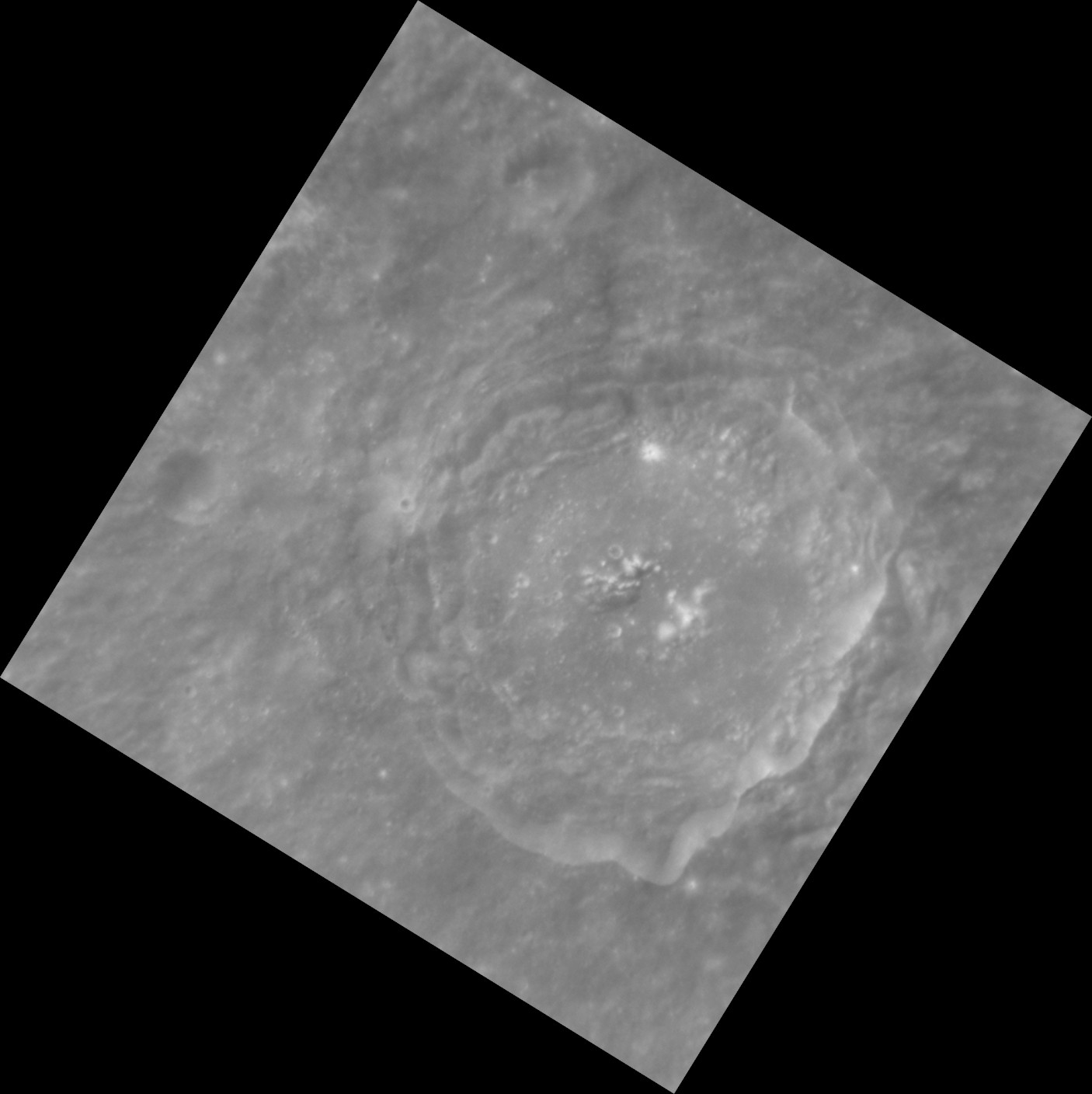
- MESSENGER NAC
- Planet: Mercury
- Coordinates: 20.33°S 333.30°W
- Quadrangle: Derain
- Diameter: 42 km (26 mi)
- Eponym: Sayyid Abdallah Bin Ali Bin Nasir

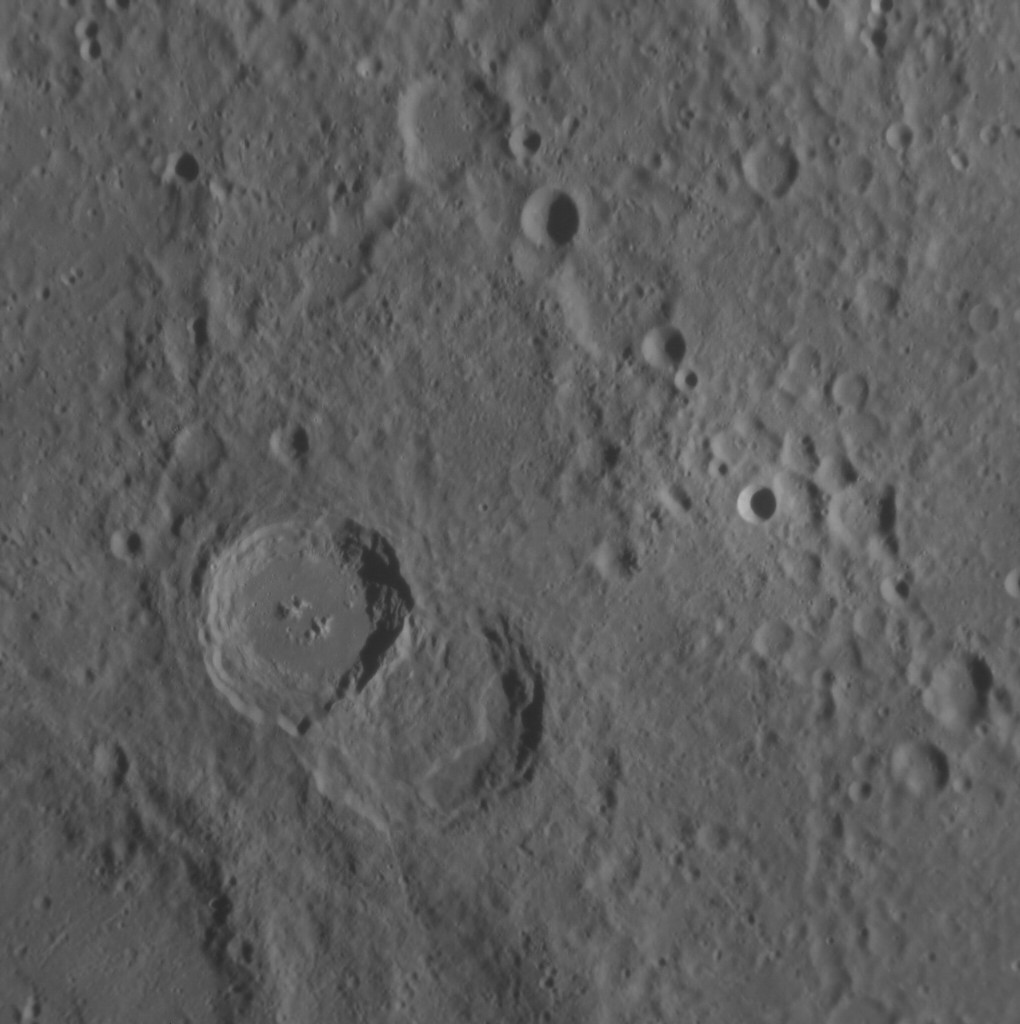
Nasir (below left of center) at a lower sun angle

Nasir is a crater on Mercury. Its name was adopted by the International Astronomical Union (IAU) on August 13, 2024, for the Swahili poet Sayyid Abdallah Bin Ali Bin Nasir, who lived from 1735 to 1810.

Nasir is to the south of the large crater Ellington.
