= Joplin (crater) =

Crater on Mercury

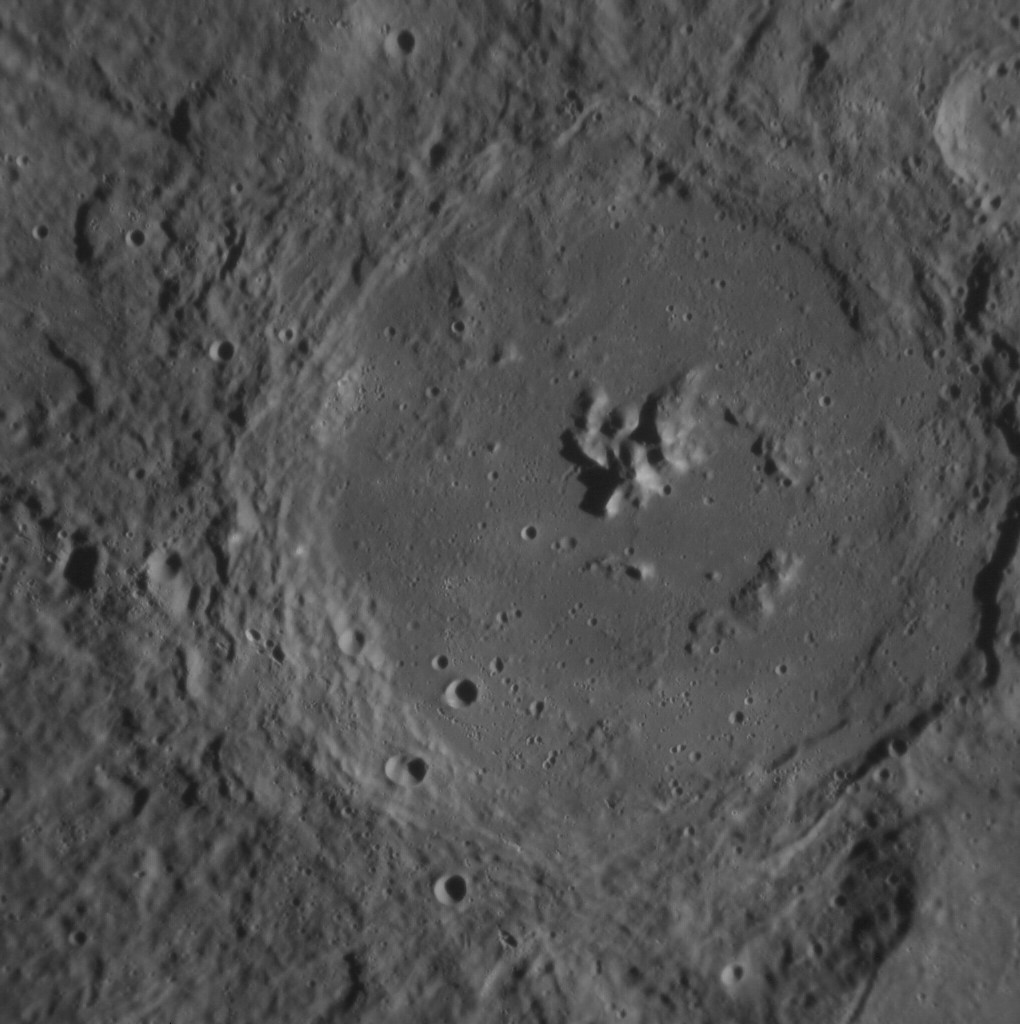
- MESSENGER NAC image
- Planet: Mercury
- Coordinates: 38.56°S 334.49°W
- Quadrangle: Debussy
- Diameter: 139 km (86 mi)
- Eponym: Scott Joplin

Joplin is a crater on Mercury. Its name was adopted by the International Astronomical Union (IAU) in 2012, after the American composer Scott Joplin.

Joplin's peak ring is relatively small compared to the crater diameter and it is offset from the center. It is one of 110 peak ring basins on Mercury.

Joplin is located about half-way between the prominent crater Debussy and the crater Lennon. It is south of the crater Travers. Together with crater Bulsara (named after Freddie Mercury), Lennon and Joplin form a line of nearly equally spaced craters.

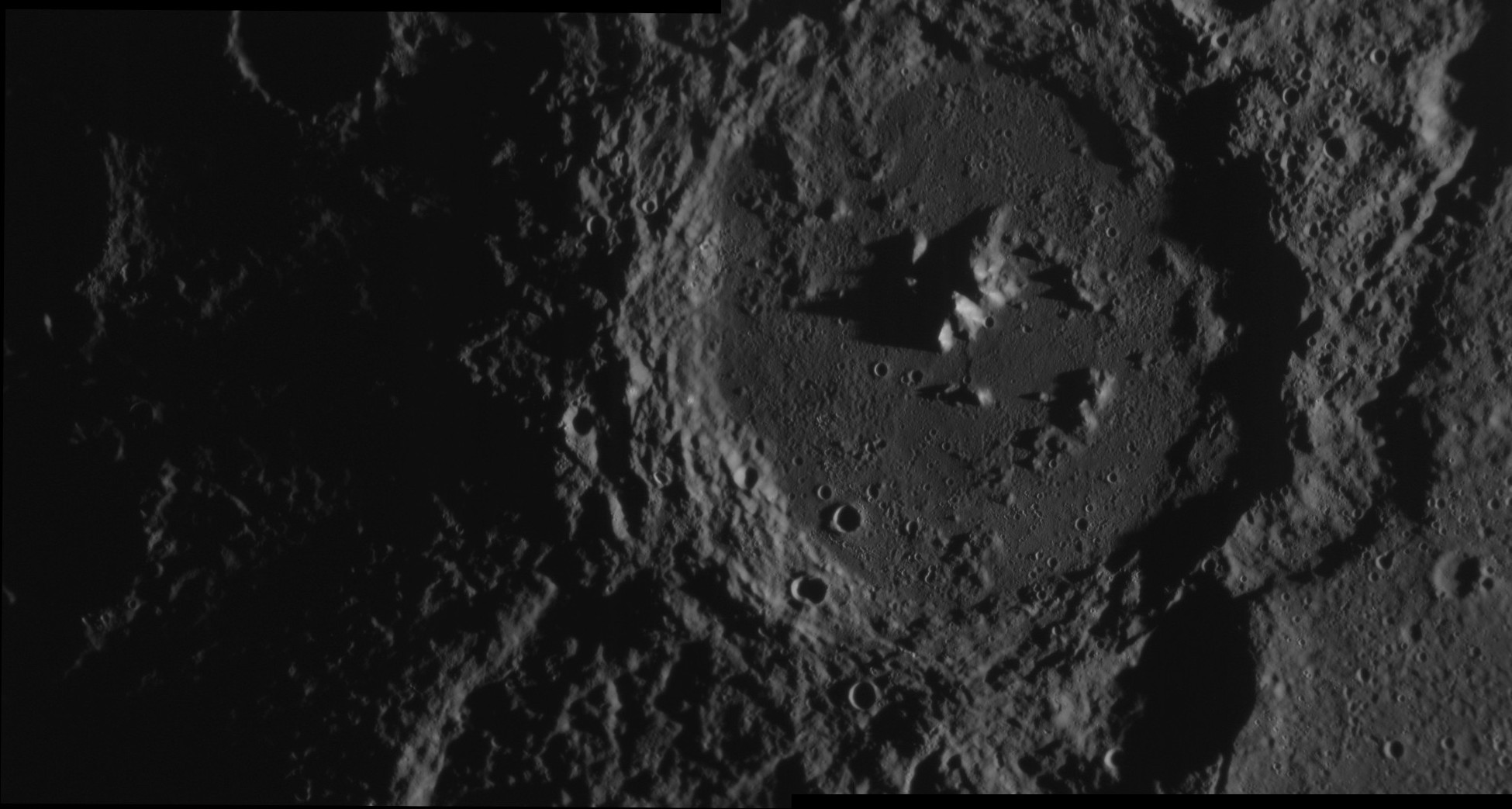
Joplin crater at the terminator
