= Berkel (crater) =

Crater on Mercury

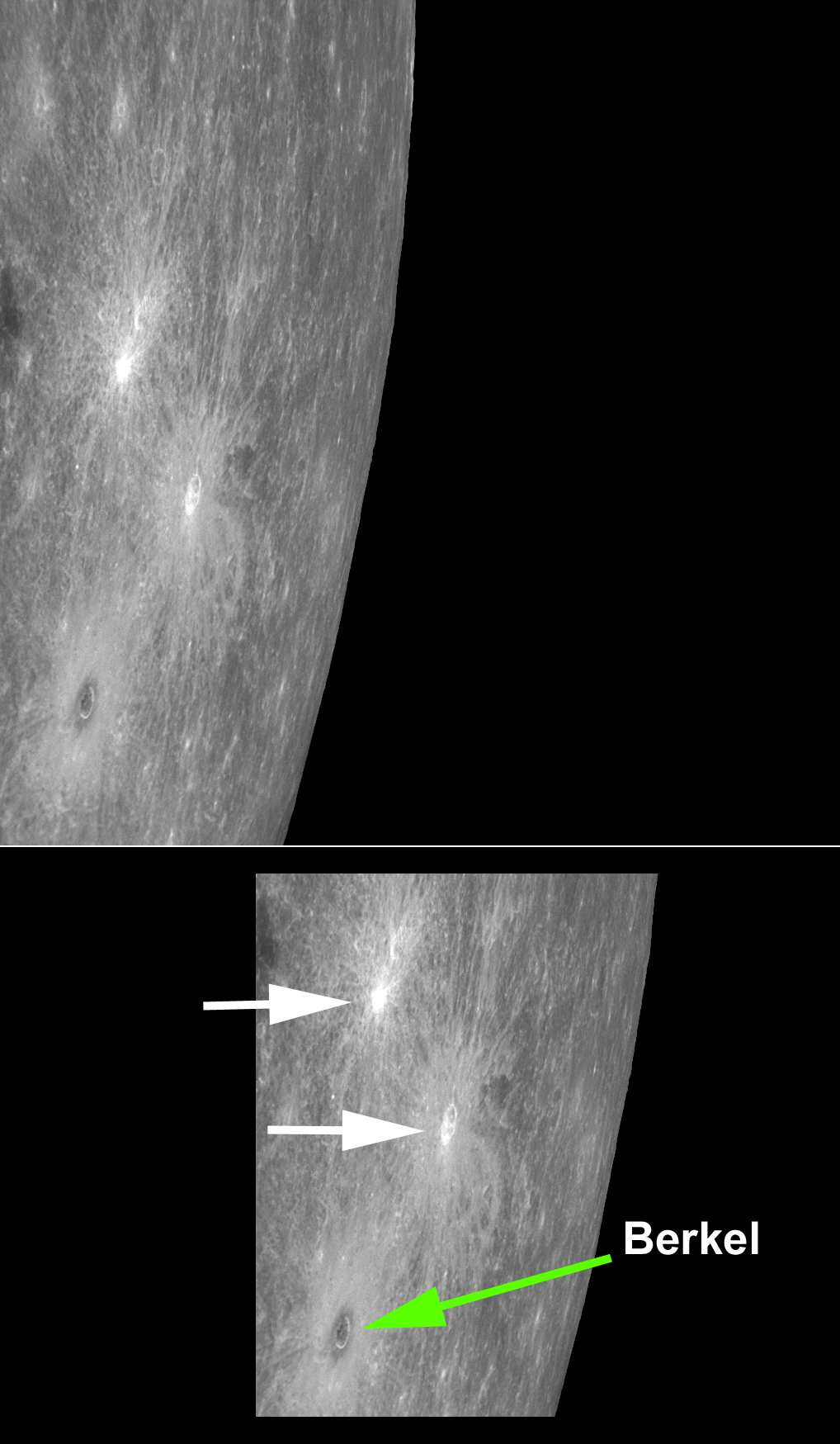
- The two white arrows indicate neighboring bright craters, in contrast to Berkel's dark halo.
- Feature type: Impact crater
- Location: Derain quadrangle, Mercury
- Coordinates: 13.6°S 333.5°W
- Diameter: 21 km (13 mi)
- Eponym: Sabri Berkel

Berkel is a crater on the planet Mercury. Its name was approved by the IAU on July 9, 2009. It was named after the modernist painter Sabri Berkel.

The crater contains dark material in its center and in a ring immediately surrounding it. Moreover, Berkel is surrounded by a blanket of bright ejecta and a system of bright rays. Other craters on Mercury's surface, such as Bashō, also exhibit both bright rays and dark halos. In contrast, two neighboring craters have bright rays but lack dark halos.

The floor of Berkel is a dark spot of low reflectance material (LRM), closely associated with hollows.

Berkel lies within the much larger and older crater Ellington, which is to the southeast of Derain. Both Derain and Ellington lie within a much older, 730-km-diameter, unnamed crater (referred to as b36).

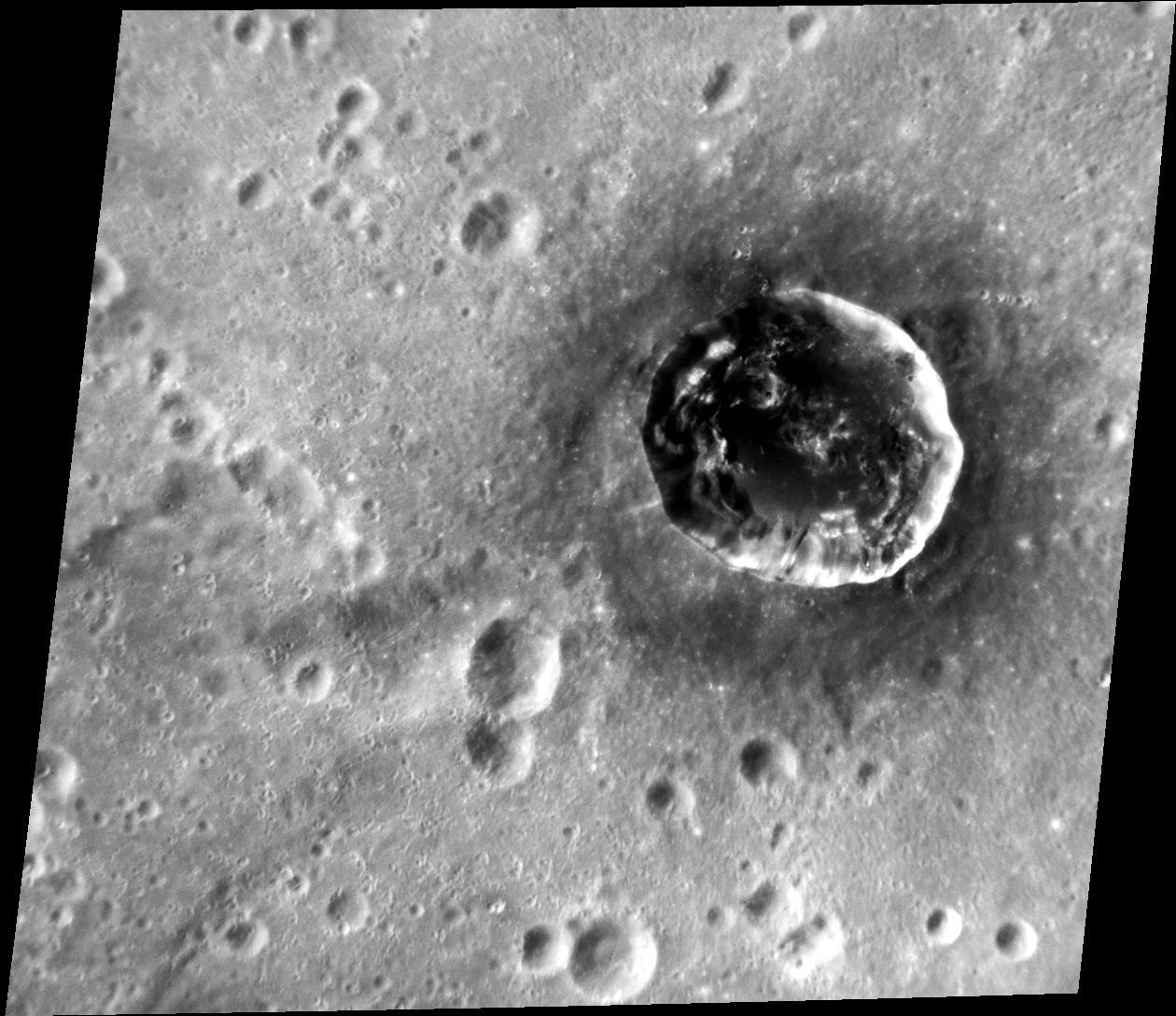
Map-projected image

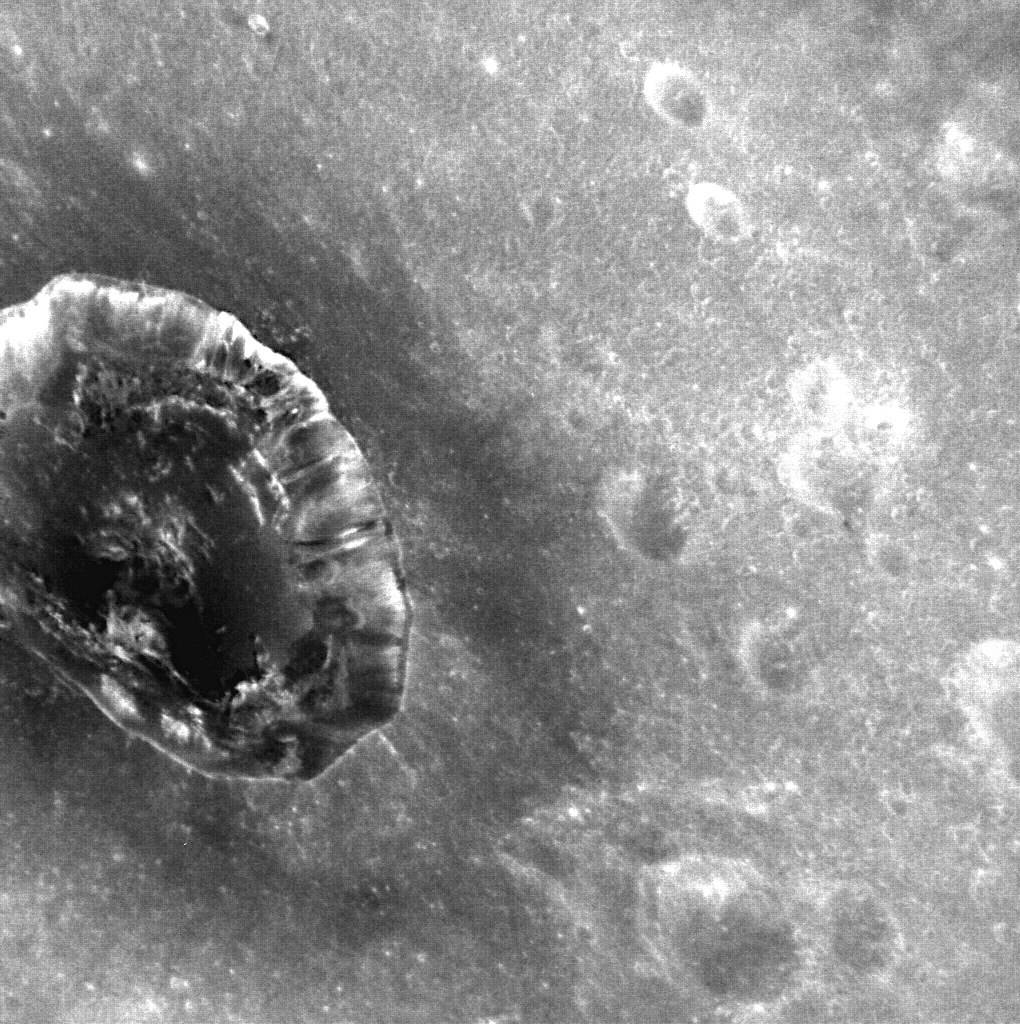
Oblique close-up
