= Barton (crater) =

Crater on Venus

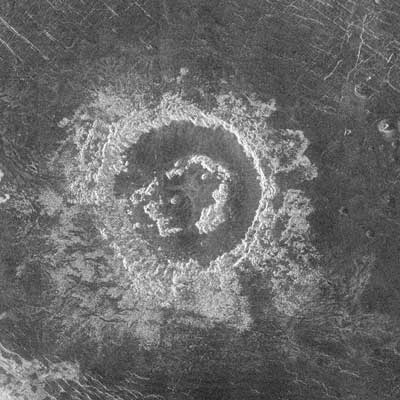
- Magellan radar image of Barton crater
- Location: Venus
- Coordinates: 27.4°N 337.5°E
- Diameter: 54 km (34 mi)
- Eponym: Clara Barton

Barton crater is a 54-km (32-mi) diameter crater on Venus. It is the size at which craters on Venus begin to possess peak rings instead of a single central peak. The floor of Barton crater is flat and radar-dark, indicating possible infilling by lava flows sometime following the impact. Barton's central peak-ring is discontinuous and appears to have been disrupted or separated during or following the cratering process. The crater was named in 1991 after Clara Barton, the founder of the American Red Cross.

Barton lies within Guinevere Planitia and is northeast of the somewhat smaller crater Lachappelle.
