= Isabella (crater) =

Crater on Venus

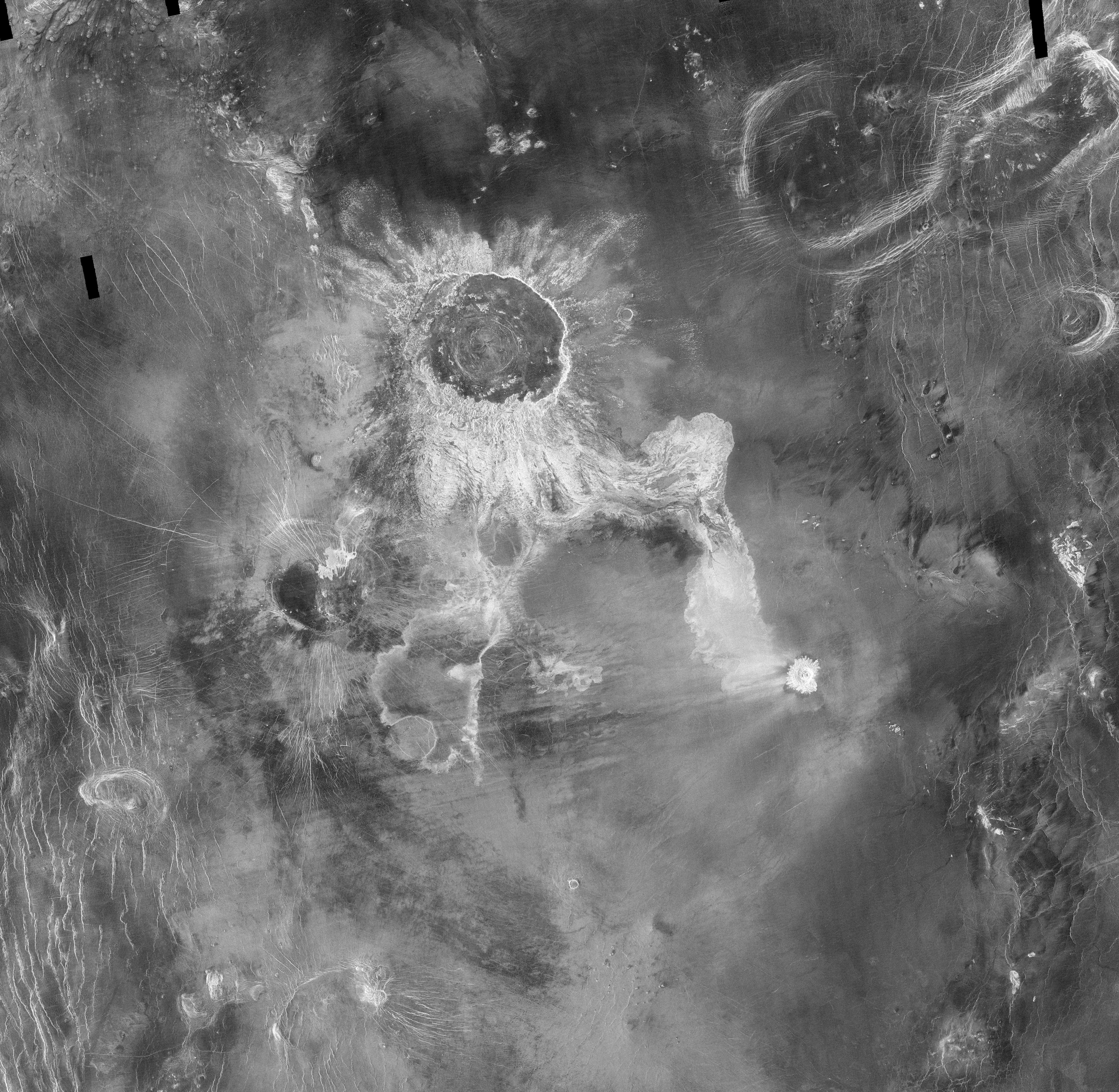
- Location: Venus
- Coordinates: 29.8°S 204.2°E
- Diameter: 175 km (109 mi)
- Eponym: Isabella I of Castile

Isabella is the second largest impact crater on Venus. The feature was named in 1994, in honor of the 15th Century queen of Spain, Isabella I of Castile. Located at 30 degrees south latitude, 204 degrees east longitude, the crater has two extensive flow-like structures extending to the south and to the southeast. The end of the southern flow partially surrounds a pre-existing 40-kilometer (25 mi) circular volcanic shield. The southeastern flow shows a complex pattern of channels and flow lobes, and is overlain at its southeastern tip by deposits from a later 20-kilometer (12 mi) diameter impact crater, Cohn.

The extensive flows, unique to Venusian impact craters, are a continuing subject of study for a number of planetary scientists. It is thought that the flows may consist of 'impact melt,' rock melted by the intense heat released in the impact explosion. An alternate hypothesis invokes 'debris flows,' which may consist of clouds of hot gases and both melted and solid rock fragments that race across the landscape during the impact event. That type of emplacement process is similar to that which occurs in violent eruptions on Earth, such as the 1991 Mount Pinatubo eruption in the Philippines.

Isabella is a peak ring crater.
