= Derain (crater) =

Crater on Mercury

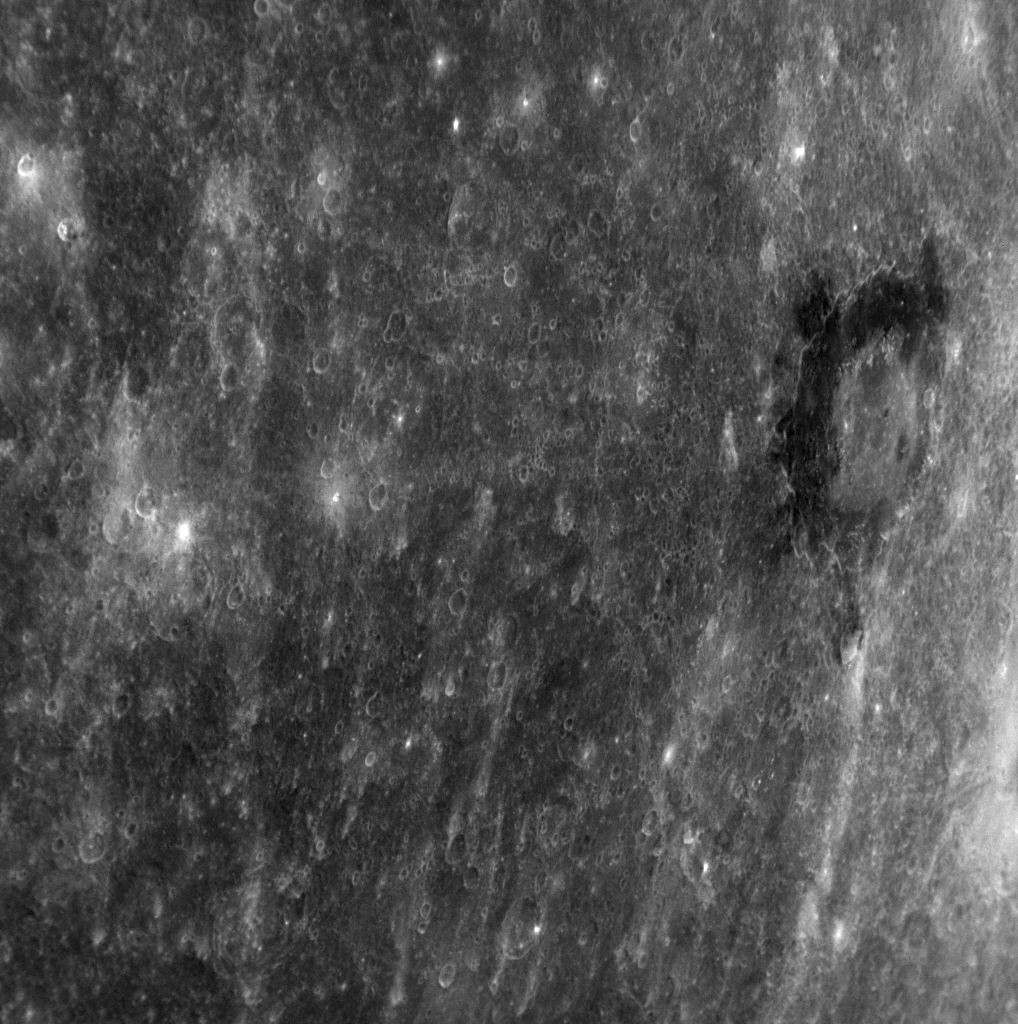
- Oblique view with Derain on the right edge, from MESSENGER's second flyby of Mercury in October 2008
- Feature type: Peak-ring impact basin
- Location: Derain quadrangle, Mercury
- Coordinates: 8.7°S 340.3°W
- Diameter: 167 km
- Eponym: André Derain

Derain is a crater on Mercury named after André Derain, a French artist, painter, sculptor and co-founder of Fauvism with Henri Matisse. It has uncommonly dark material within and surrounding the crater. The material is darker than the neighboring terrain such that this crater is easily identified even in a distant global image of Mercury. The dark halo may be material with a mineralogical composition different from the majority of Mercury's visible surface. Craters with similar dark material on or near their rims were seen on the floor of the Caloris basin during MESSENGER’s first flyby.

Derain is one of 110 peak ring basins on Mercury.

The larger and older crater Ellington is to the southeast of Derain. Both Derain and Ellington lie within a much older, 730-km-diameter, unnamed crater (referred to as b36).

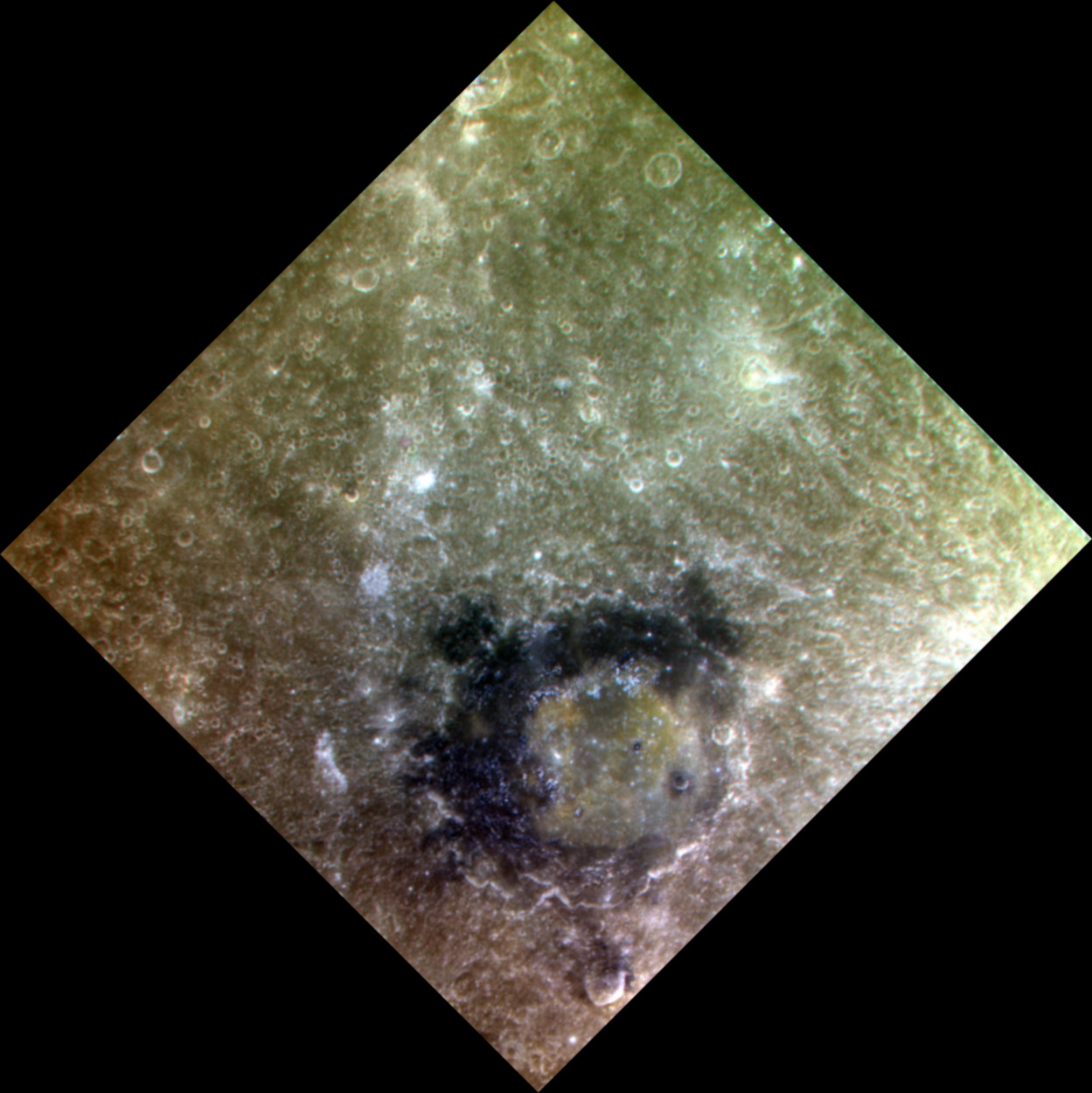
Approximate color image

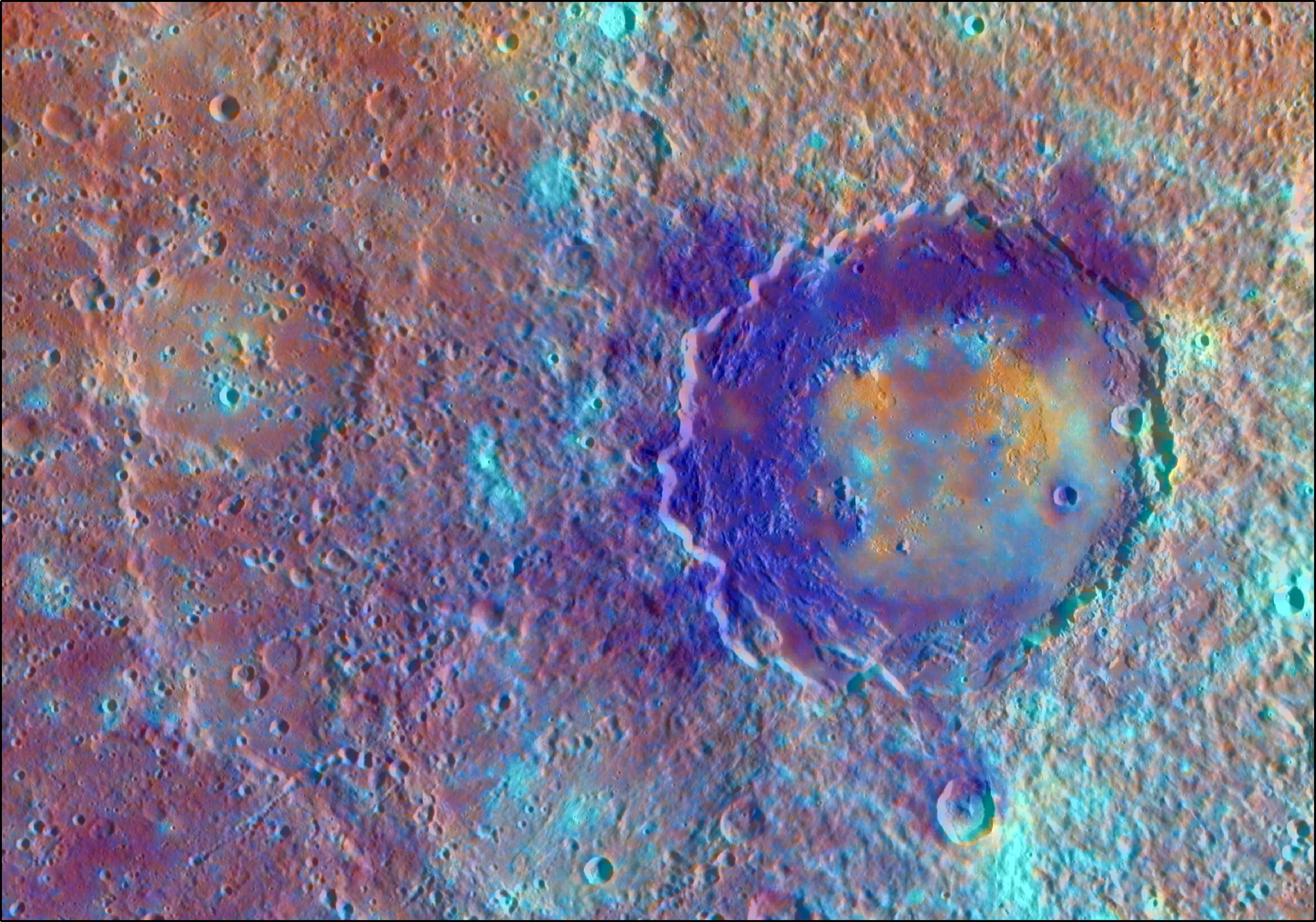
Enhanced-color image
