= Bulsara (crater) =

Crater on Mercury

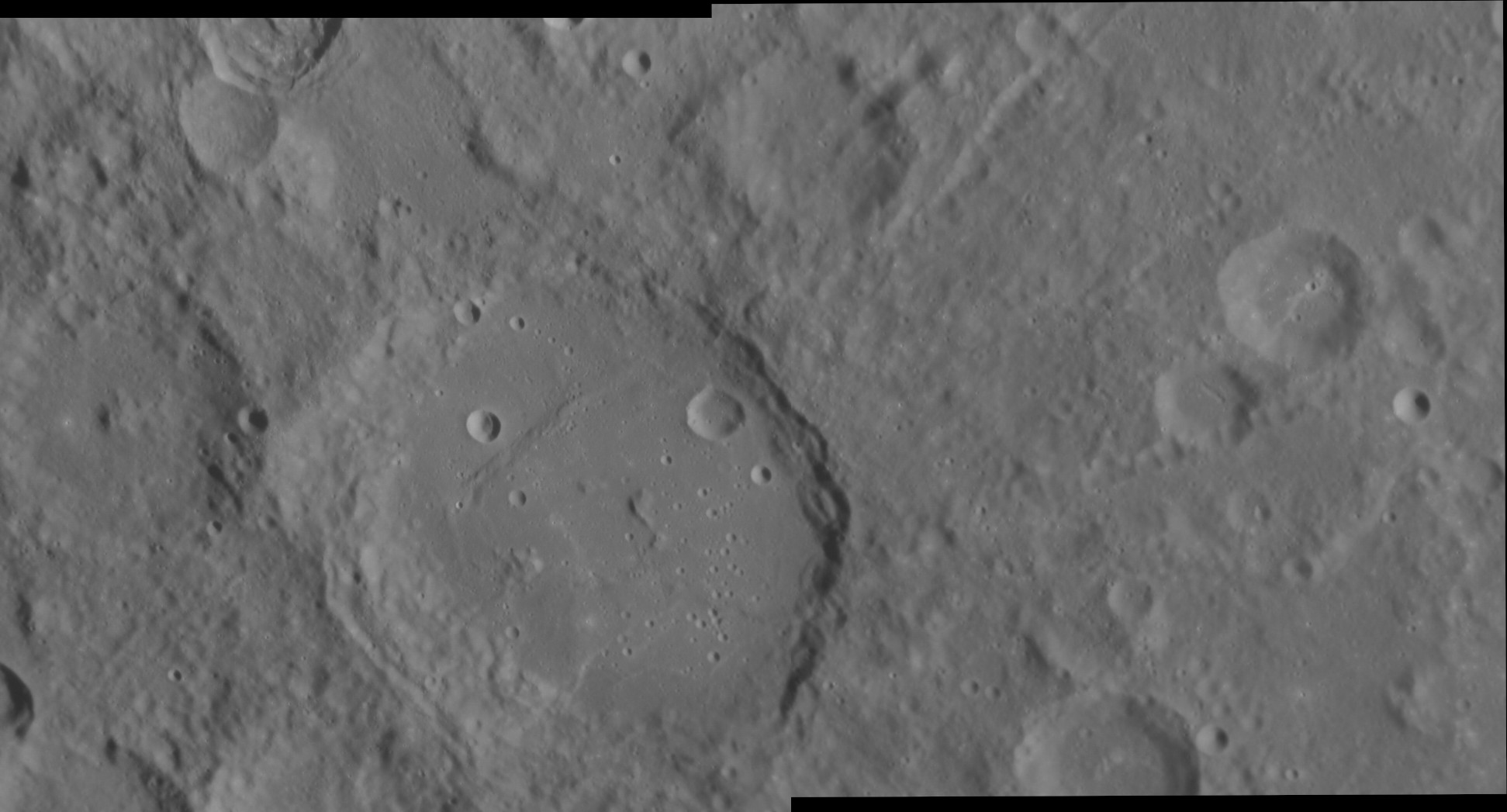
- MESSENGER NAC mosaic
- Planet: Mercury
- Coordinates: 34.16°S 300.00°W
- Quadrangle: Debussy
- Diameter: 110 km (68 mi)
- Eponym: Farrokh Bulsara (Freddie Mercury)

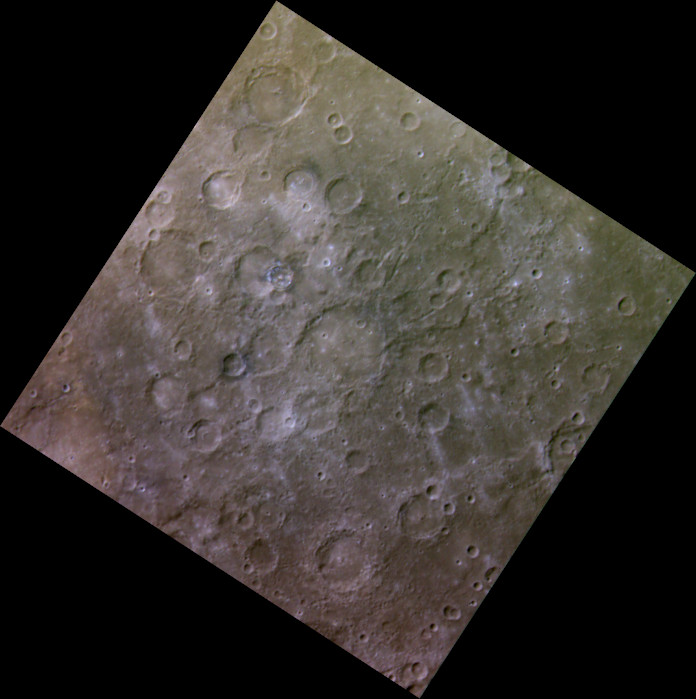
Bulsara crater region in exaggerated color

Bulsara is a crater on Mercury. Its name was adopted by the International Astronomical Union (IAU) in May 2024, for British musician Farrokh Bulsara, better known as Freddie Mercury, lead vocalist and pianist of the rock band Queen, who lived from 1946 to 1991.

Bulsara is located between Rembrandt to the east and Lennon to the west. Together with crater Joplin, Lennon and Bulsara form a line of nearly equally spaced craters.
