= Sabri Berkel =

Sabri Fetah Berkel (1907–1993) was a Turkish-Albanian modernist painter; he was one of the most important painters and academic personalities of the last century in Turkey.

Berkel was born in Skopje, where, in 1927, he completed high school at a French lyceum. From 1927 to 1928 he studied at an art school in Belgrade. From 1929–1935 he finished his studies at the Academy of Fine Arts, Florence.

Berkel visited his country Albania in 1982 where he met with his family and parents. Berkel died in Istanbul.

A crater on Mercury was named after Sabri Berkel.

== See also ==
- Modern Albanian art
