= Lennon (crater) =

Crater on Mercury

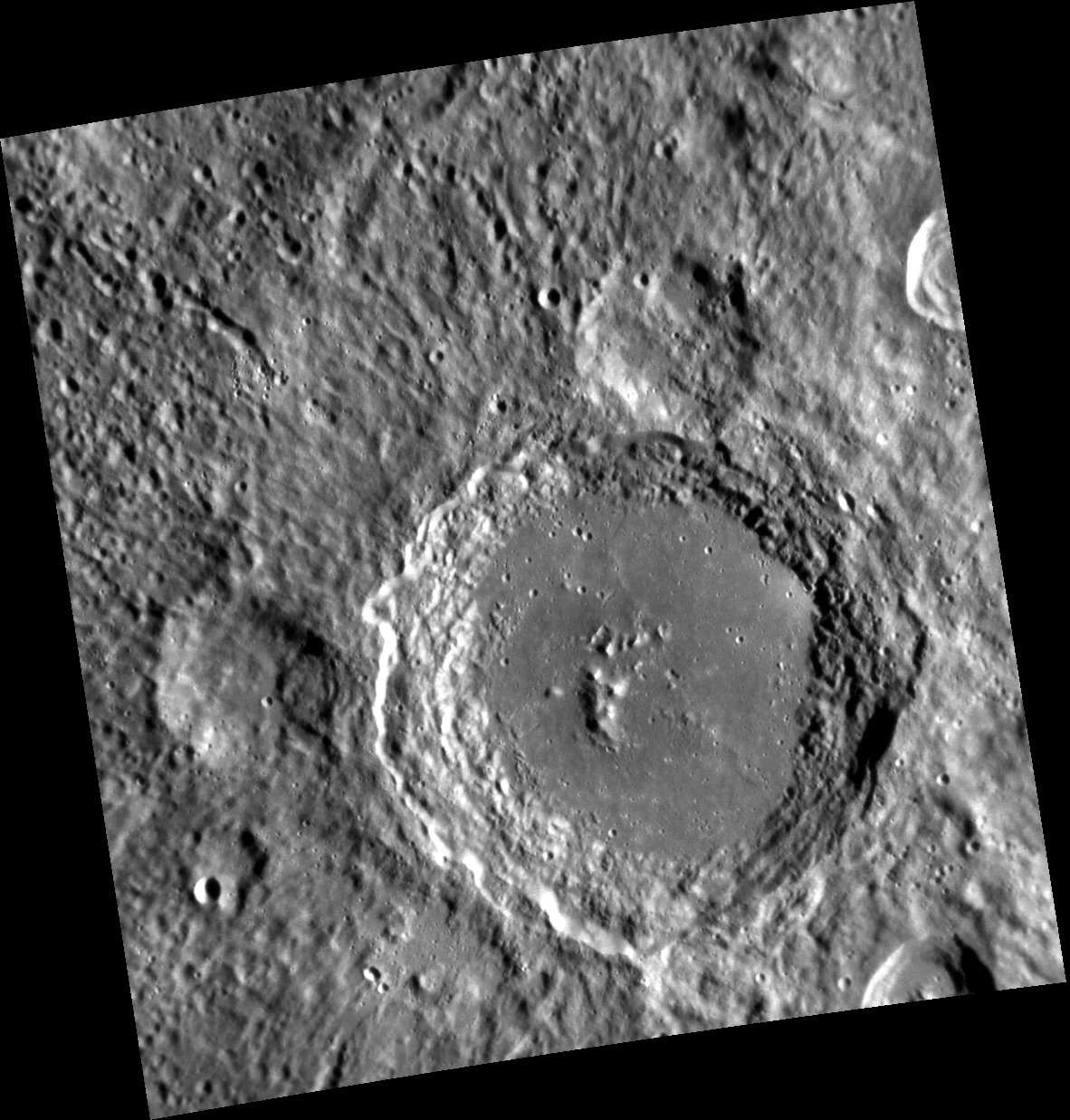
- MESSENGER image
- Planet: Mercury
- Coordinates: 36.41°S 318.82°W
- Quadrangle: Debussy
- Diameter: 95 km (59 mi)
- Eponym: John Lennon

Lennon is a crater on Mercury. Its name was adopted by the International Astronomical Union (IAU) in 2013. Lennon is named for the English singer and songwriter John Lennon (of The Beatles).

Lennon lies on the south rim of the ancient Lennon-Picasso Basin. To the east of Lennon is Bulsara, which is named after Freddie Mercury of Queen. Together with crater Joplin, Lennon and Bulsara form a line of nearly equally spaced craters.

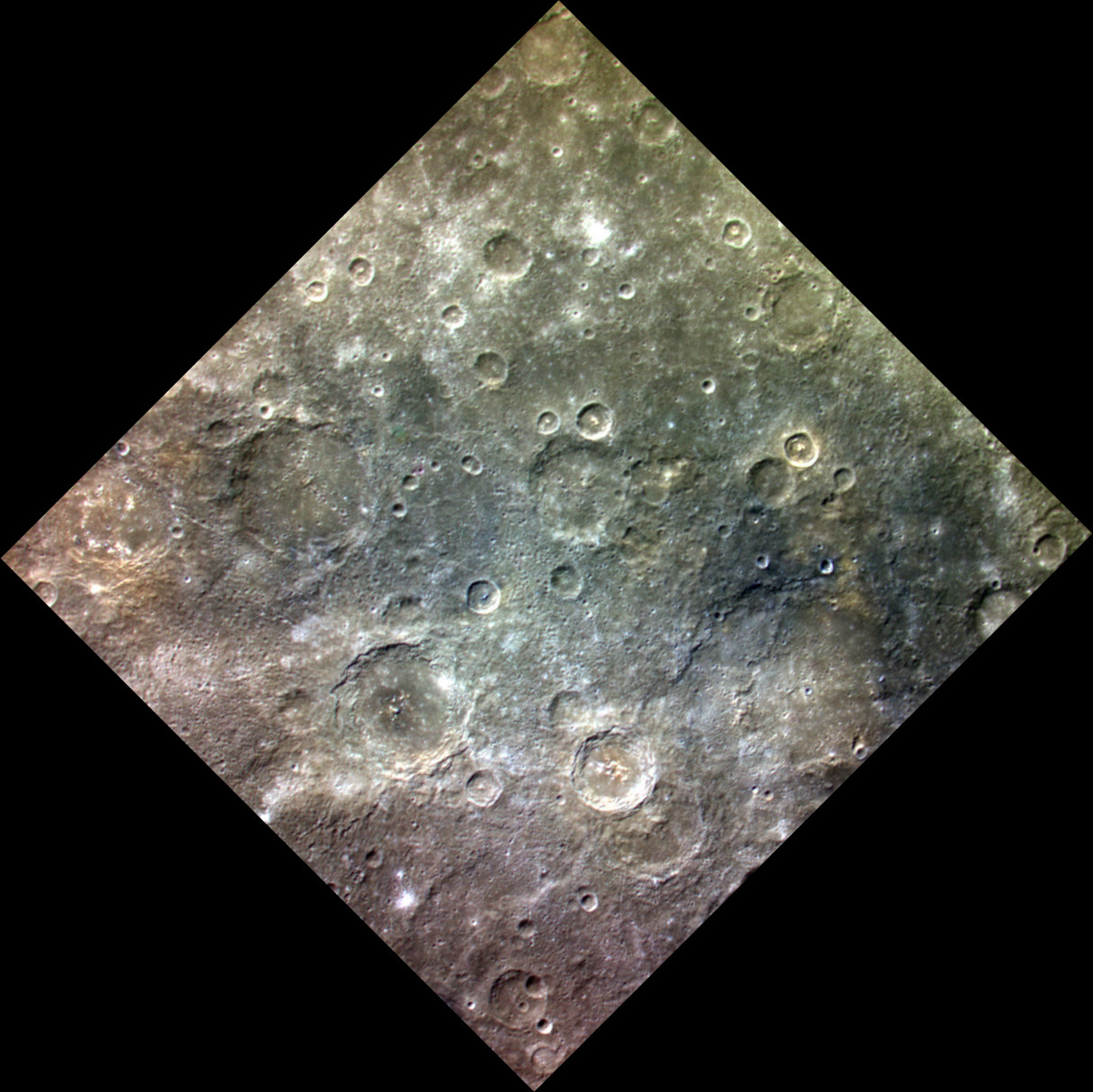
Lennon crater (lower left) and vicinity in approximate color
