= Martins (crater) =

Crater on Mercury

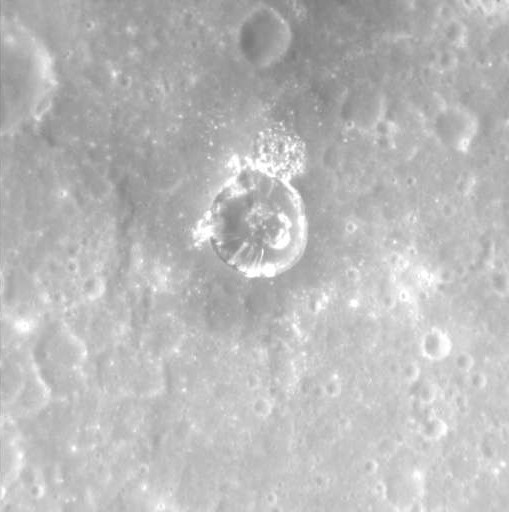
- MESSENGER NAC image
- Planet: Mercury
- Coordinates: 8.0°S 304.93°W
- Quadrangle: Derain
- Diameter: 12.4 km (7.7 mi)
- Eponym: Maria Martins

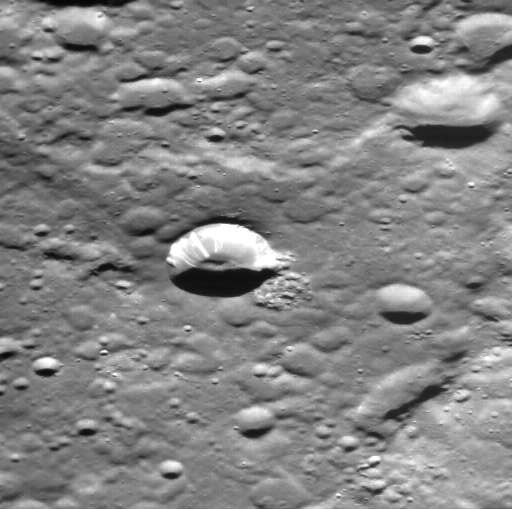
Oblique image with Martins at center

Martins is a small crater on Mercury. Its name was adopted by the International Astronomical Union (IAU) in 2019. Martins is named for the Brazilian sculptor Maria Martins.
