= Holst (crater) =

Crater on Mercury

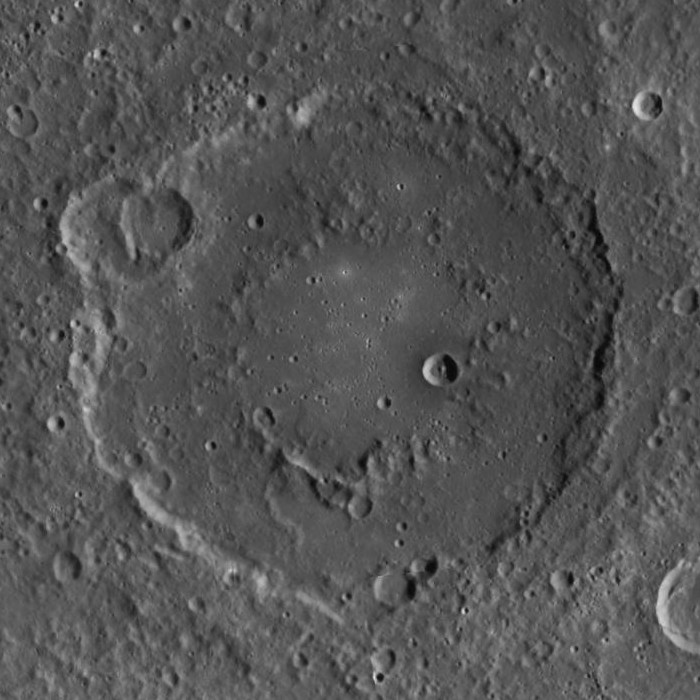
- MESSENGER WAC mosaic of Holst
- Feature type: Central-peak impact basin
- Location: Derain quadrangle, Mercury
- Coordinates: 17.42°S 315.04°W
- Diameter: 170 km (110 mi)
- Eponym: Gustav Holst

Holst is a crater on Mercury. Its name was adopted by the International Astronomical Union (IAU) on April 24, 2012.

Holst is one of 110 peak ring basins on Mercury. To the east is another peak-ring basin, Nabokov, of similar size. Holst lies in a topographic low near the center of the ancient Lennon-Picasso Basin.

The plains around Holst are classified as intracrater plains which have rough topography, as opposed to smooth plains (such as Apārangi Planitia or Borealis Planitia). The intracrater plains are saturated with secondary craters.

Holst is named for the British composer Gustav Theodore Holst. Holst composed a musical suite called The Planets, including its third movement Mercury, the Winged Messenger.

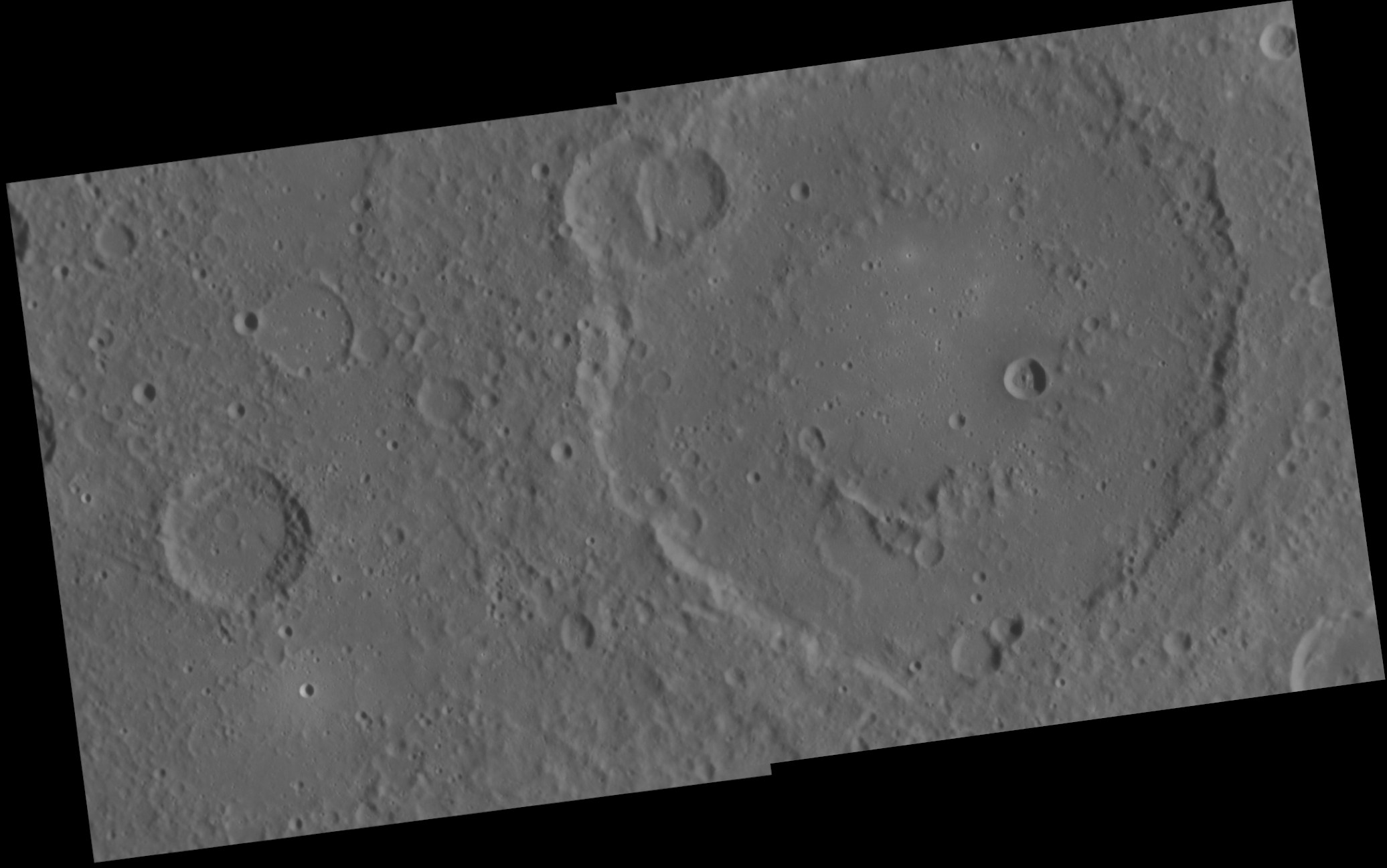
MESSENGER NAC mosaic

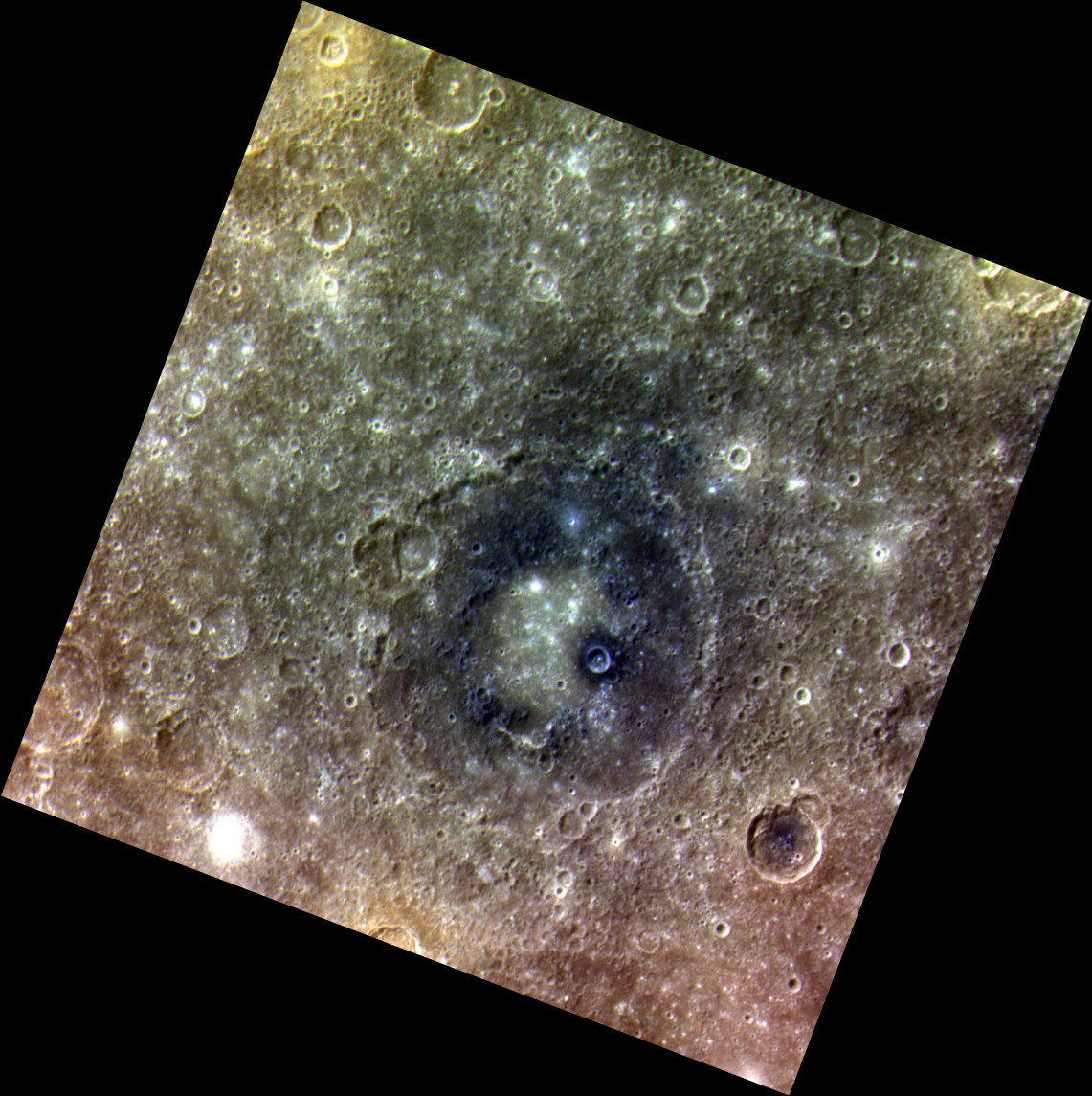
Exaggerated color image

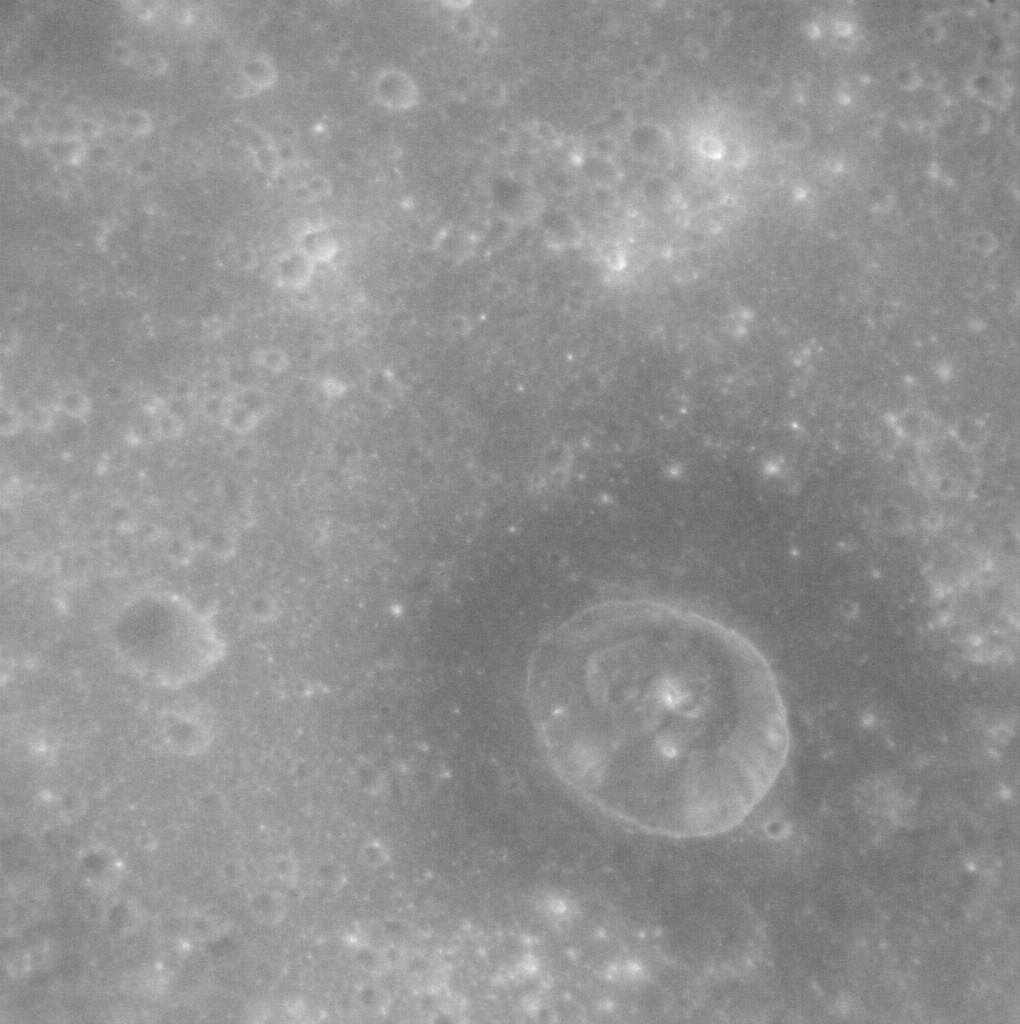
Closeup of crater with dark halo within the peak ring
