= Lennon-Picasso Basin =

Crater on Mercury

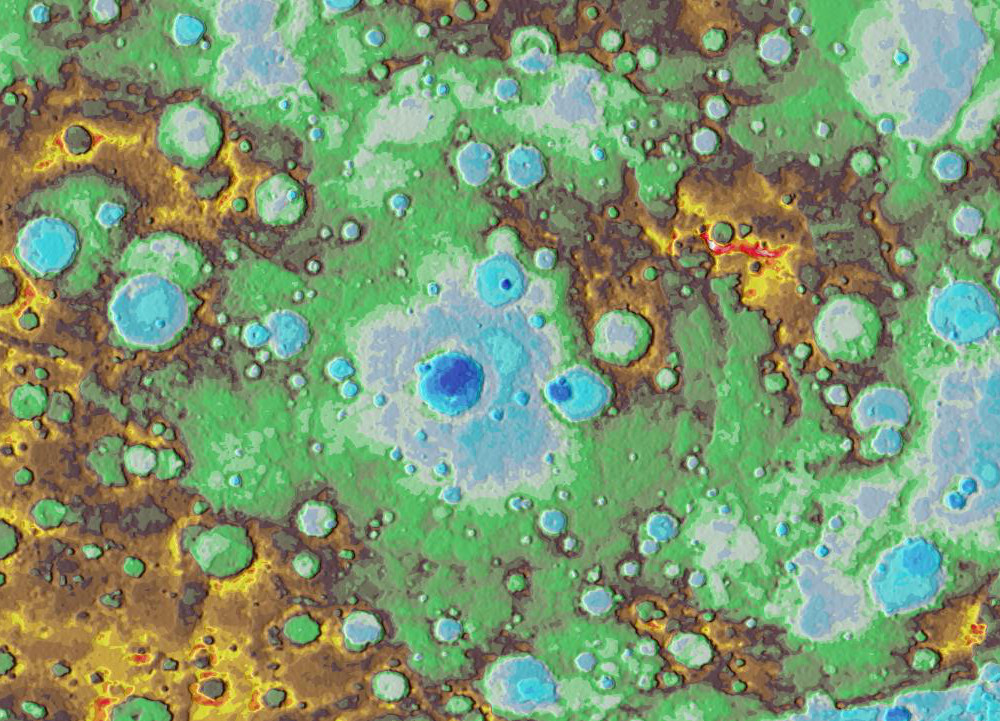
Topographic map of the Lennon-Picasso Basin

The Lennon-Picasso Basin is an ancient (Pre-Tolstojan) impact basin on Mercury, discovered from topographic mapping of the surface by the MESSENGER spacecraft, and was originally designated b56. It is approximately 1450 km in diameter and spans the region between Picasso crater on the north rim to Lennon crater on the south rim, and the crater Holst is near the center. The basin is heavily eroded by subsequent impacts and is not obvious on the surface. A topographic low (surrounding Holst) is present near the center, and scarps representing a remnant of the eastern basin rim are intact. The scarps include the highest point on the planet.

The northern part of the basin is within the Derain quadrangle and the southern part is within the Debussy quadrangle.

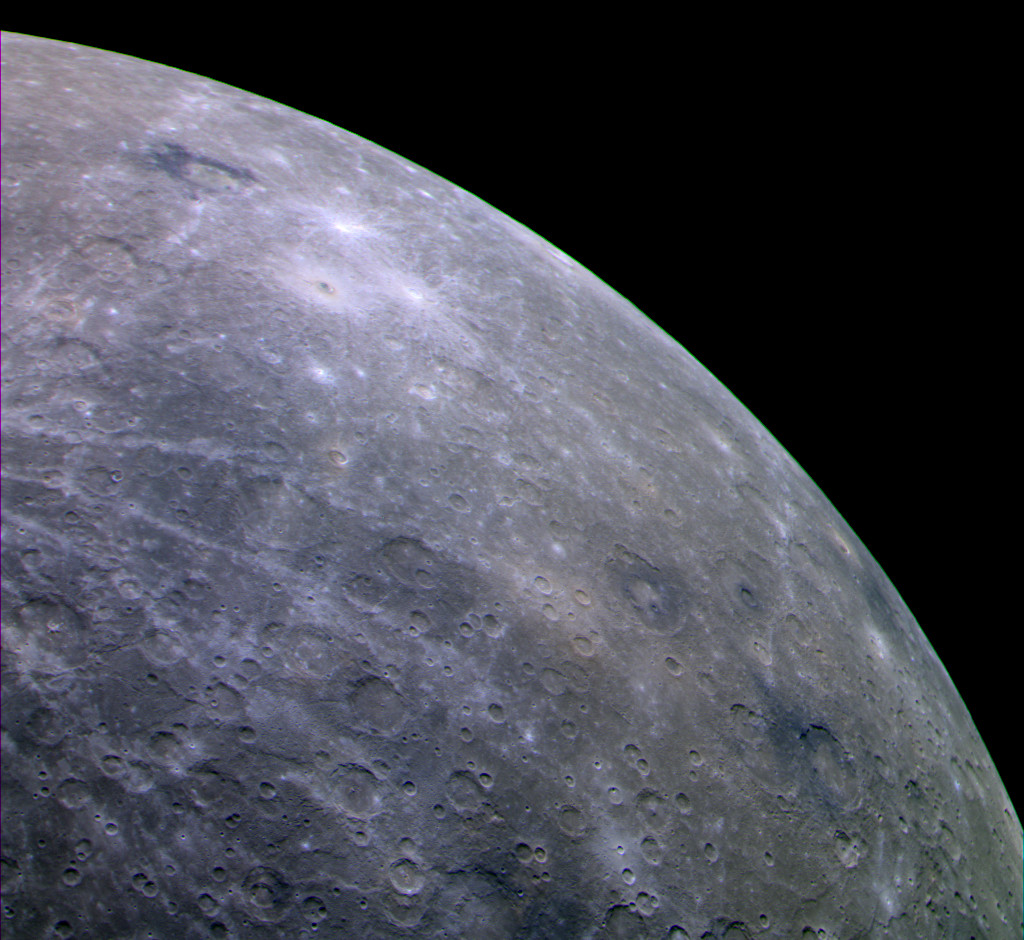
Most of the Lennon-Picasso basin is visible in this exaggerated-color image. Lennon is in the left-central foreground, and Picasso is near the limb at right.
