= Derain quadrangle =

Quadrangle on Mercury

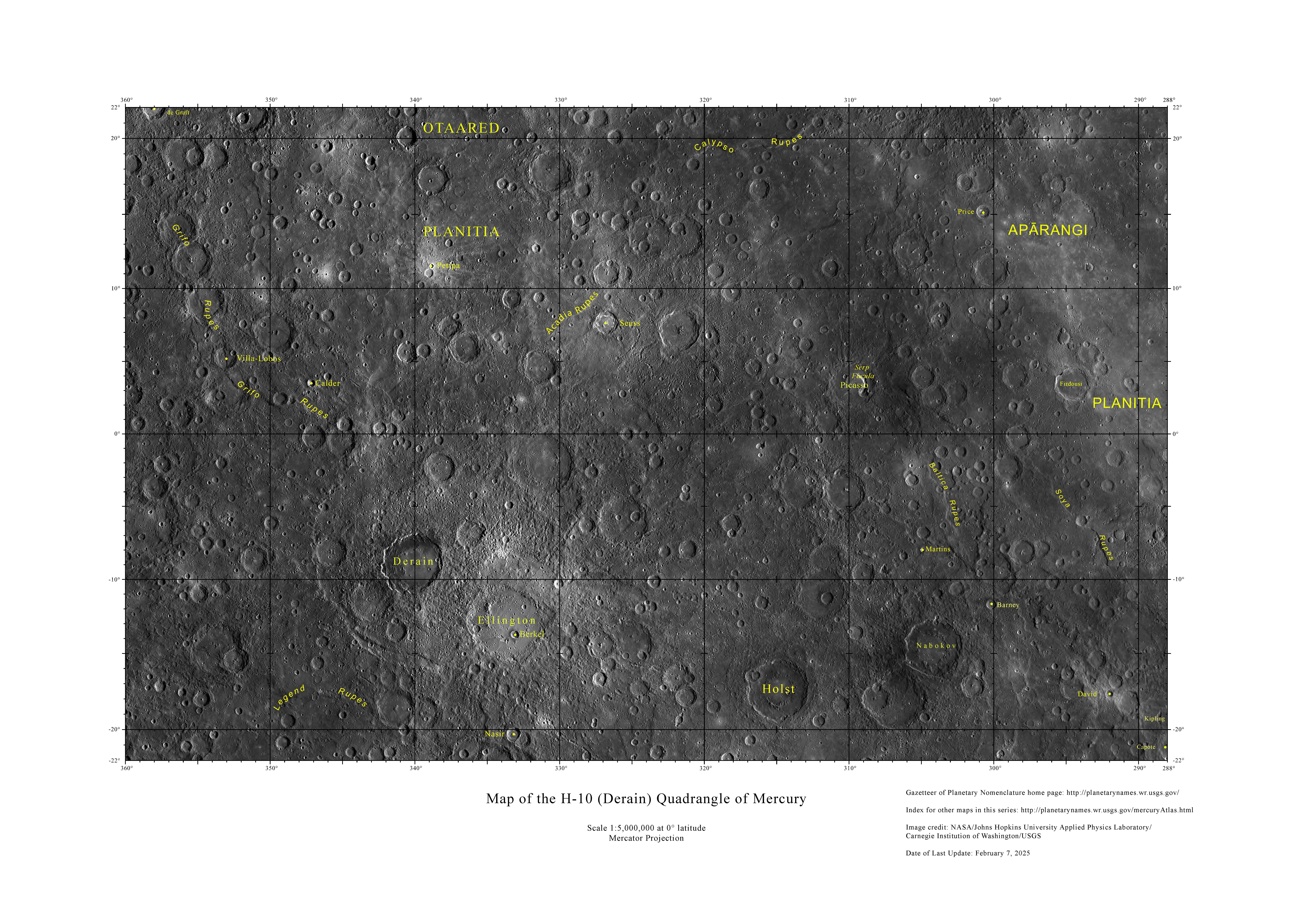
Derain quadrangle as mapped by the MESSENGER spacecraft

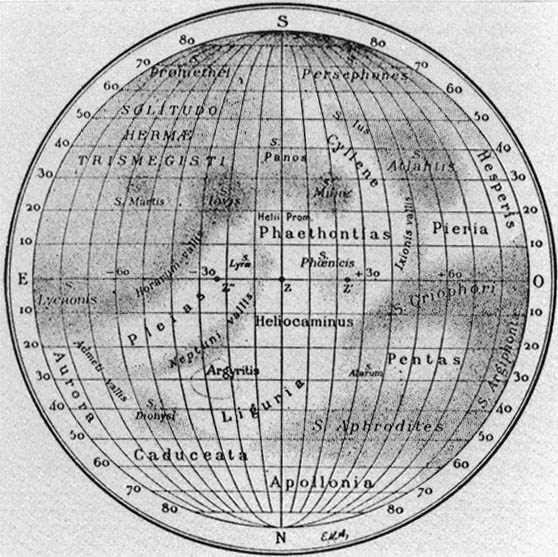
1934 map showing the Pieria albedo feature

The Derain quadrangle (H-10) is one of fifteen quadrangles on Mercury. It runs from 288° to 360° west longitude and from 22° S to 22° N latitude. Named after the Derain crater, it was mapped in detail for the first time after MESSENGER entered orbit around Mercury in 2011. It had not been mapped prior to that point because it was one of the six quadrangles that was not illuminated when Mariner 10 made its flybys in 1974 and 1975. These six quadrangles continued to be known by their albedo feature names, with this one known as the Pieria quadrangle.

The hypothetical Skinakas Basin was thought to exist on the west side of the quadrangle, but MESSENGER images did not confirm its existence. The large Lennon-Picasso Basin covers much of the eastern part of the quadrangle. An unnamed basin (b36) of 730 km diameter underlies the craters Derain and Ellington. The most prominent characteristic of the basin is the remant of the western and southern rim. A lobate scarp is present along the southern rim.

Kuiper quadrangle is to the west of Derain quadrangle, and Eminescu quadrangle is to the east. Hokusai quadrangle is to the north, and Debussy quadrangle is to the south.

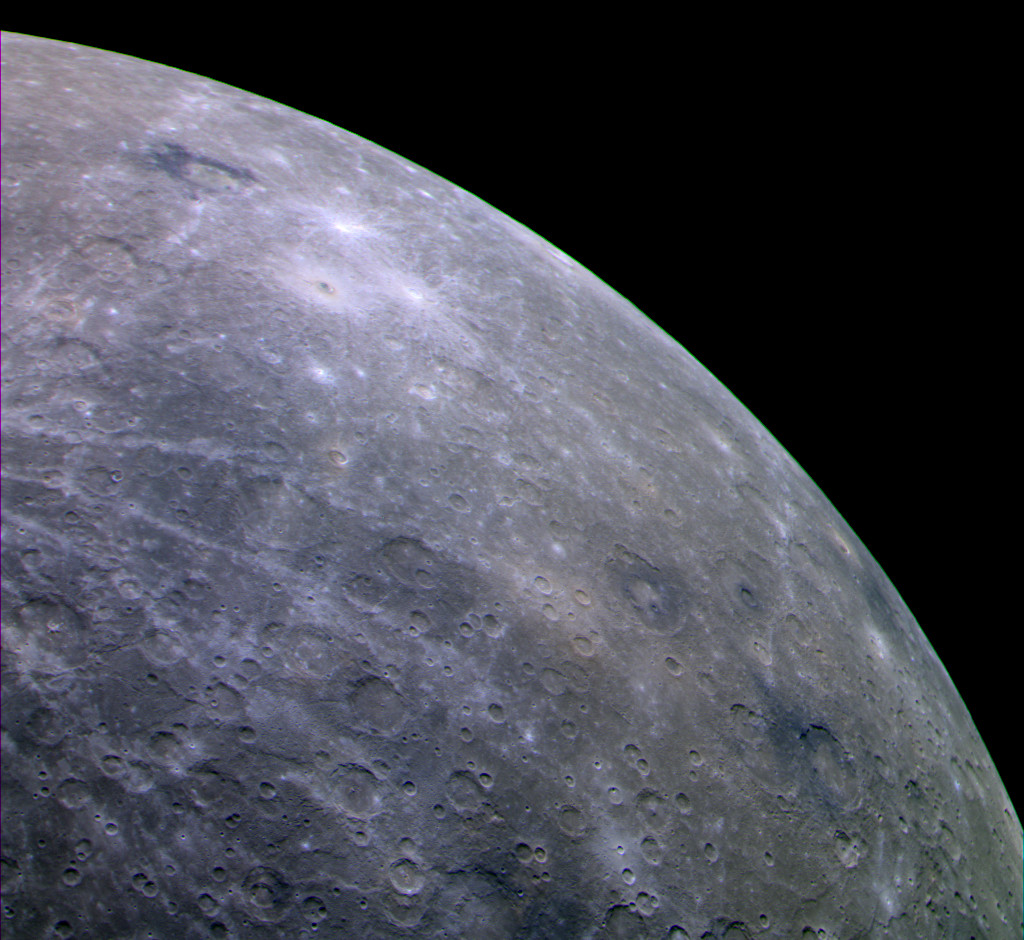
Derain quadrangle area, looking obliquely north. Derain crater and Berkel crater (within Ellington) are at upper left, and Holst and Nabokov craters are at lower right.

== Geological history ==
H-1 Borealis (features)
H-5 Hokusai (features)	H-4 Raditladi (features)	H-3 Shakespeare (features)		H-2 Victoria (features)
H-10 Derain (features)	H-9 Eminescu (features)	H-8 Tolstoj (features)	H-7 Beethoven (features)	H-6 Kuiper (features)
H-14 Debussy (features)	H-13 Neruda (features)	H-12 Michelangelo (features)		H-11 Discovery (features)
H-15 Bach (features)
