= Peak ring =

Roughly circular ring within an impact crater

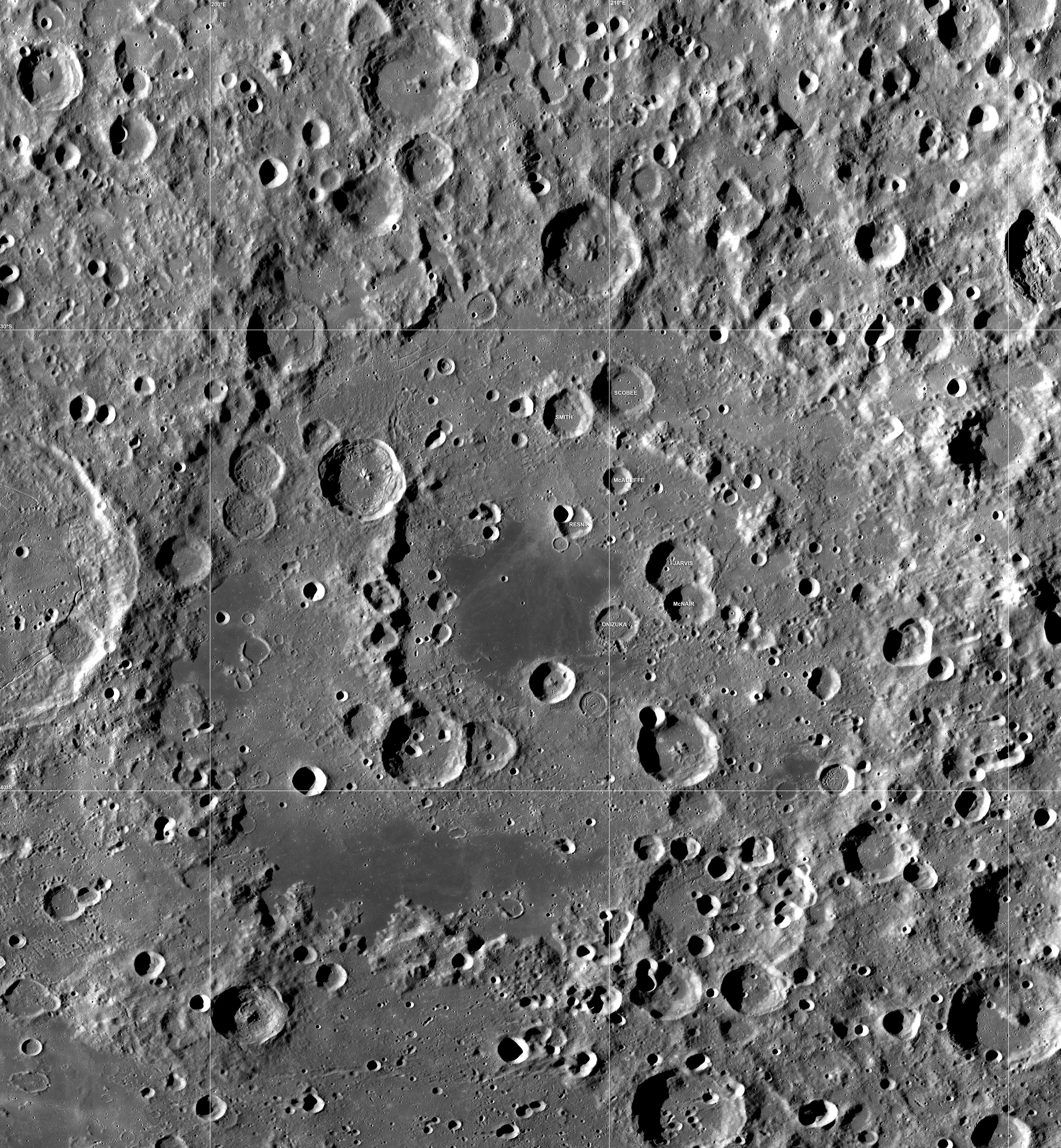
The Apollo basin is a peak ring crater

A peak ring crater is a type of complex crater, which is different from a multi-ringed basin or central-peak crater. A central peak is not seen; instead, a roughly circular ring or plateau, possibly discontinuous, surrounds the crater's center, with the crater rim still farther out from the center.

== Formation ==
The rings form by different processes, and inner rings may not be formed by the same processes as outer rings.

It has long been the view that peak rings are formed in the stage subsequent to central peak formation in craters, with the stage being dependent on the crater diameter and planetary gravity. The central peaks of craters are believed to originate from hydrodynamic flow of material lifted by inward-collapsing crater walls, while impact-shattered rock debris is briefly turned to fluid by strong vibrations that develop during crater formation. The peak-ring structure of Chicxulub crater was probably formed as inward-collapsing material struck the over-steepened central peak, to form a hydraulic jump at the location where the peak ring was located.

Other hypotheses have been formulated. Perhaps, in the case of Chicxulub crater, an over-high central peak collapsed into the peak ring.

Chicxulub is Earth's only crater to have an intact peak ring structure. The Carswell crater in Saskatchewan, Canada, may also be an eroded peak ring crater.

== Examples ==
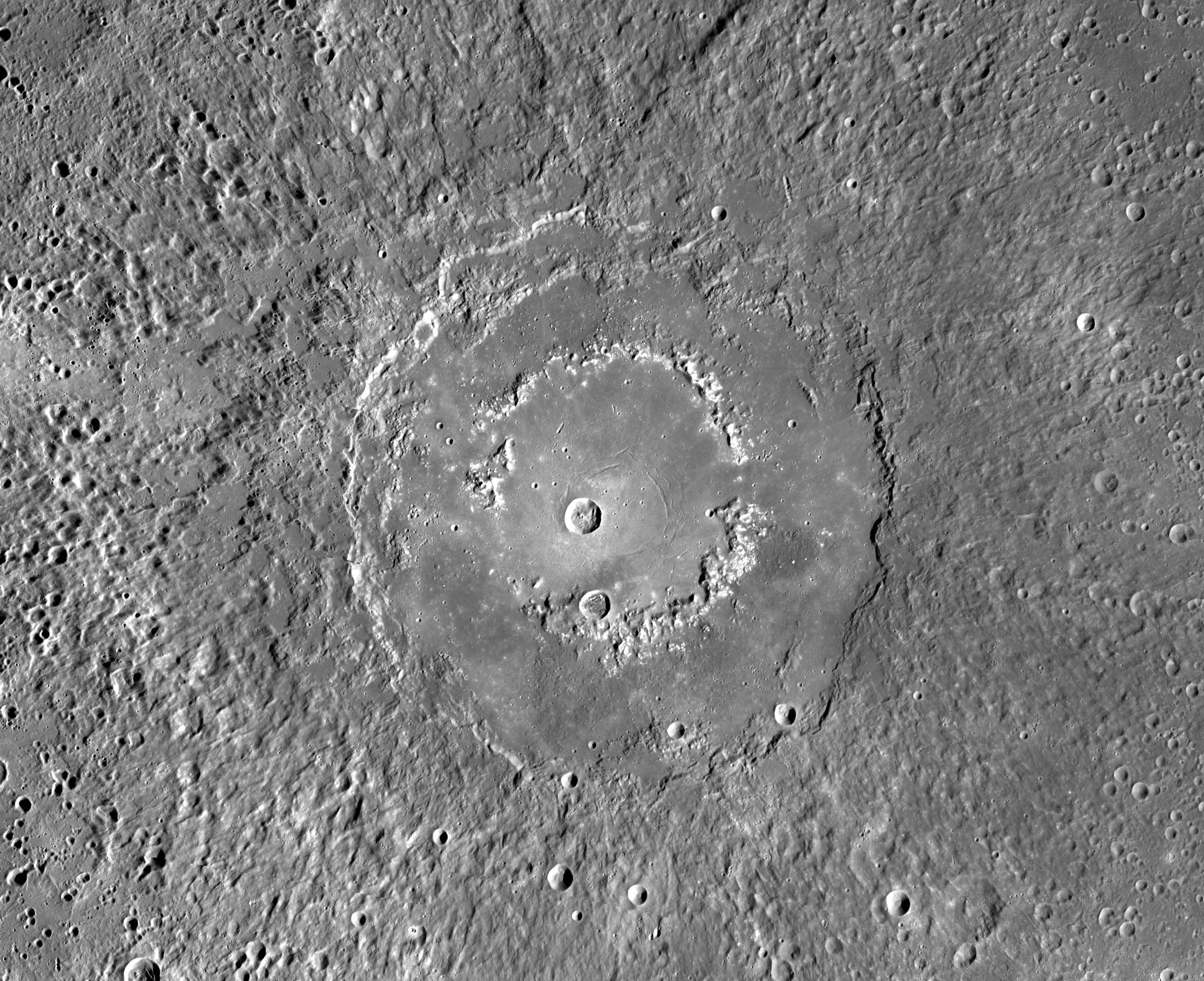
Raditladi, a relatively young peak-ring crater on Mercury

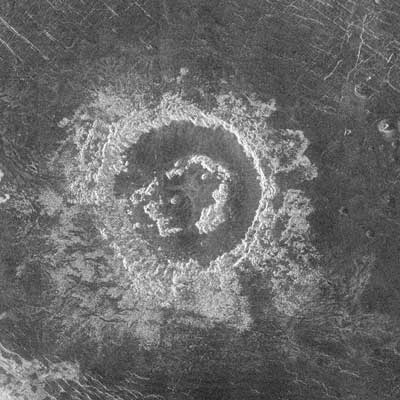
Barton, a peak-ring crater on Venus

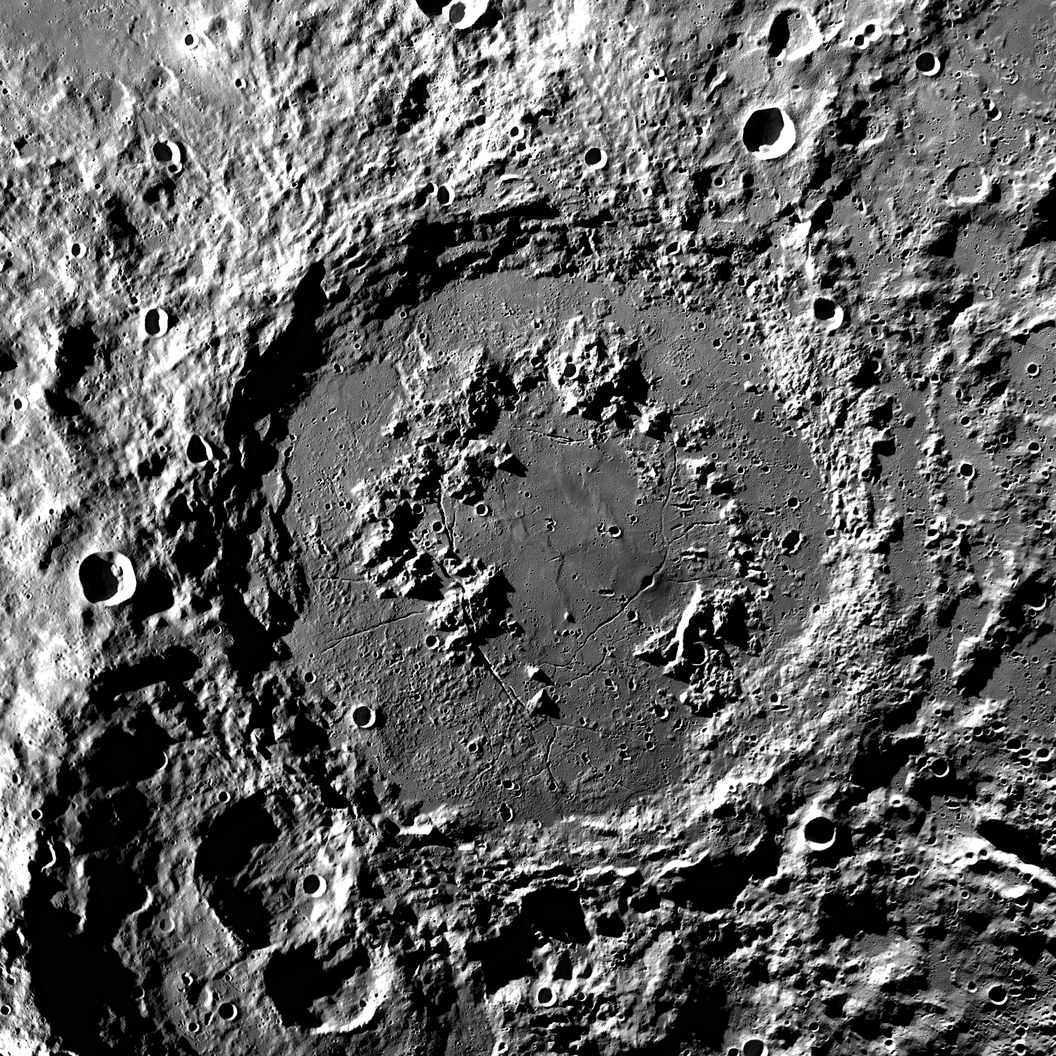
Schrödinger, a peak-ring crater on the Moon

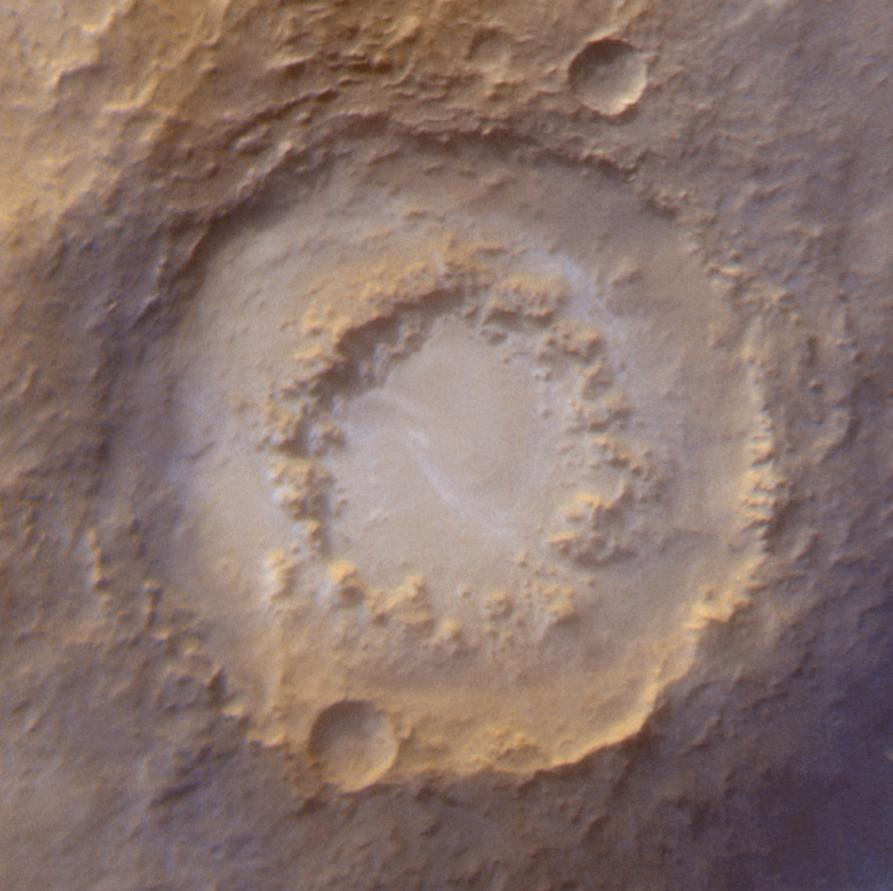
Lowell, a peak-ring crater on Mars

== See also ==
On Mercury:

- Ahmad Baba
- Caravaggio
- Chekhov
- Eminescu
- Holst
- Homer
- Michelangelo
- Mozart
- Nabokov
- Polygnotus
- Rachmaninoff
- Raditladi
- Renoir
- Vivaldi

On Venus:

- Barton
- Isabella
- Meitner
- Mona Lisa
- Wheatley
- Yablochkina

On Earth:

- Chesapeake Bay
- Chicxulub
- Ries
- West Clearwater Lake

On the Moon:

- Apollo
- Antoniadi
- Grimaldi
- Hertzsprung
- Korolev
- Milne
- Poincaré
- Schrödinger
- Schiller-Zucchius Basin
- Freundlich-Sharonov Basin

On Mars:

- Galle
- Herschel
- Kepler
- Lowell
- Lyot
- Schiaparelli

== External links and references ==
- Understanding the Impact Cratering Process: a Simple Approach
- Johnson, Scott K. (17 November 2016). "How the dino-killing asteroid put a ring on its crater". Ars Technica.
- Peak-Ring Structure, Encyclopedia of Planetary Landforms
- The formation of peak rings in large impact craters, Joanna V. Morgan et al., 2016, Science, 18 Nov 2016: Vol. 354, Issue 6314, pp. 878–882
