= List of montes on Venus =

This is a list of montes (mountains, singular mons) on the planet Venus. The largest peaks are clustered in the northern hemisphere of the planet. Four major mountain ranges of Venus are Akna Montes, Danu Montes, Freyja Montes, and Maxwell Montes. They are on the Ishtar Terra, surrounding the Lakshmi Planum.

There are 118 mons and montes currently recognized by the International Astronomical Union. Six features were formerly classified as mons but have since been reclassified or removed from nomenclature entirely. Notably, Skadi Mons, which was once believed to be the tallest peak on Venus, has since been labeled as a misidentified feature after it was determined in 2025 that it does not correspond to any summit or distinct topographic feature.

Venusian mountain belts are typically characterized by having many parallel ridges and troughs, similar to the mountain ranges on Earth. These mountain ranges appear to have been formed by the compressive tectonic folding and buckling of Venus's crust, similar to mountain formation on Earth. However, Venusian mountains have steep slopes due to a lack of erosion; there exist no rivers or glaciers to erode the mountains, and other causes of erosion found on Earth are also absent on Venus.

Venusian mountains are all named after goddesses in the mythologies of various cultures, except for the Maxwell Montes, which is named after the physicist James Clerk Maxwell.

== Montes ==
Name	Coordinates	Diam. (km)	AS	Origin
Abeona Mons	44.8°S 273.1°E	375	(1)	Abeona, Roman goddess of travelers
Akna Montes	68.9°N 318.2°E	830	(1)	Akna, Mayan goddess of birth
Aleksota Mons	9.0°S 308.5°E	250	(1)	Aleksota, Lithuanian goddess of love
Anala Mons	11.0°N 14.1°E	525	(1)	Anala (Hindu), Hindu fertility goddess. Name changed from Anala Corona.
Api Mons	38.9°N 54.7°E	190	(1)	Api, Scythian goddess of earth
Arasy Mons	40.26°S 209.74°E	69.0	(1)	Arasy, Guarani (Paraguay) moon goddess
Atai Mons	22.0°S 291.0°E	250	(1)	Atai, Efik (Ghana) wife of sky god Abassi
Atanua Mons	9.5°N 308.9°E	1000	(1)	Atanua, dawn goddess from Marquesas Islands
Atira Mons	52.2°N 267.6°E	152	(1)	Atira, Pawnee wife of Great Spirit Tirawa
Atsyrkhus Mons	78.5°S 227.0°E	170	(1)	Atsyrkhus (Ossetian people of central Asia), Ossetian, daughter of sun god Khur
Awenhai Mons	60.0°S 248.0°E	100	(1)	Awenhai, Mohawk/Iroquois fertility goddess
Bagbartu Mons	65.5°N 279.0°E	600	(1)	Bagbartu (Urartian), Urartu goddess, worshipped at Musasir
Bécuma Mons	34.0°N 21.9°E	0	(1)	Bécuma (Celtic), Irish dawn goddess
Bunzi Mons	45.8°N 354.9°E	36	(1)	Bunzi (Woyo people of Dem. Rep. Congo), Woyo (Zaire) rainbow goddess
Chloris Mons	45.4°S 294.6°E	180	(1)	Chloris, Greek flower goddess
Chuginadak Mons	38.0°S 246.0°E	450	(1)	Chuginadak (Aleut Inuit), Aleutian volcano goddess
Cipactli Mons	31.5°S 332.5°E	200	(1)	Cipactli, Aztec crocodile-like monster-goddess from which the earth was created
Ciuacoatl Mons	53.0°N 150.9°E	100	(1)	Ciuacoatl, Aztec earth goddess. Changed from Ciuacoatl Corona
Copacati Mons	34.8°N 276.8°E	80	(1)	Copacati, Incan lake goddess
Danu Montes	58.5°N 334.0°E	808	(1)	Danu (Celtic), Celtic mother of gods
Dzalarhons Mons	0.5°N 34.0°E	120	(1)	Dzalarhons (Haida people of North America), Haida (NW Coast) volcano goddess
Egle Mons	59.0°S 134.0°E	110	(1)	Eglė, Lithuanian underwater queen
Eostre Mons	45.1°N 329.1°E	26	(1)	Eostre (Germanic), Teutonic goddess of spring
Erzulie Mons	68.0°S 8.0°E	300	(1)	Erzulie (Haitian), Haitian voodoo goddess of love
Fand Mons	7.0°N 158.0°E	300	(1)	Fand (Celtic), Celtic goddess of healing and pleasure
Faravari Mons	43.5°S 309.0°E	500	(1)	Faravari (Malagasy), Malagasy (Madagascar) water goddess
Firtos Mons	47.35°S 220.09°E	143	(1)	Firtos, Hungarian diminished goddess, queen of the good fairies.
Freyja Montes	74.1°N 333.8°E	579	(1)	Freyja, Norse fertility goddess
Gauri Mons	20.2°S 102.2°E	75	(1)	Gauri (Hindu), Indian mountain goddess
Gula Mons	21.9°N 359.1°E	276	(1)	Gula (Babylonian), Mesopotamian medicine goddess
Gurshi Mons	47.5°S 58.5°E	210	(1)	Gurshi (Buryat), Buryatian fishing deity
Gwen Mons	21.4°S 238.7°E	200	(1)	Irish goddess of happiness and smiles
Hallgerda Mons	53.1°N 198.3°E	57	(1)	Hallgerda (Norse), Icelandic goddess of vanity
Hathor Mons	38.7°S 324.7°E	333	(1)	Hathor (Egyptian), Egyptian sky goddess
Idunn Mons	46.5°S 214.5°E	250	(1)	Idun, Norse goddess
Ilithyia Mons	13.5°S 315.5°E	90	(1)	Ilithyia, Greek goddess of childbirth
Innini Mons	34.6°S 328.5°E	339	(1)	Innini, Babylonian earth mother worshipped at Kish
Irnini Mons	14.6°N 16.0°E	475	(1)	Irnini, Assyro-Babylonian goddess of cedar-tree mountains
Iseghey Mons	9.0°N 171.0°E	500	(1)	Iseghey (Sakha people of Russia), Yakutian/Saha goddess of cows
Ixtab Mons	15.7°N 242.2°E	80	(1)	Ixtab, Mayan goddess of death
Jael Mons	51.2°N 120.8°E	36	(1)	Jael, Hebrew biblical heroine
Kali Mons	9.4°N 29.2°E	325	(1)	Kali (Hindu), Hindu goddess, mother of death
Katl-Imi Mons	69.0°S 126.0°E	120	(1)	Katl-Imi, Khanty sun goddess
Kokyanwuti Mons	35.5°N 212.0°E	400	(1)	Kokyanwuti (Hopi people of North America), Hopi earth goddess – "Spider Woman"
Kono Mons	19.5°N 268.0°E	350	(1)	Senufu (Mali, Cote d’Ivoire), goddess of wild birds
Kshumay Mons	54.9°S 58.0°E	250	(1)	Kshumay (Nurestan, Afghanistan), Nuristan (NE Afghanistan) vegetation goddess
Kunapipi Mons	33.9°S 86.0°E	220	(1)	Kunapipi (Australian aborigine), Australian mother earth goddess. Changed from Kunapipi Corona.
Kurukulla Mons	48.7°N 103.0°E	59	(1)	Kurukulla (Tibetan), Etan (Tibet) goddess of wealth
Lahar Mons	14.0°N 162.0°E	225	(1)	Lahar, Assyro-Babylonian goddess of domestic animals
Laka Mons	79.9°N 262.0°E	220	(1)	Laka (Hawaiian), Hawaiian uncultivated area goddess
Lamashtu Mons	2.8°N 172.7°E	260	(1)	Lamashtu (Sumerian), Sumerian goddess who inflicted children with diseases
Lanig Mons	68.5°S 91.0°E	400	(1)	Lanig (Semang people of the Malay Peninsula), Semang (Malay Peninsula) creator goddess
Loo-Wit Mons	59.5°S 56.0°E	150	(1)	Loowit (Multnomah and Klikitat people of North America), Multnomah and Klikitat (NW Coast) volcano goddess, embodied in Mt. St. Helens
Maat Mons	0.5°N 194.6°E	395	(1)	Ma'at (Egyptian), Ancient Egyptian goddess of truth and justice
Maxwell Montes	65.2°N 3.3°E	797	(1)	James Clerk Maxwell, British physicist (1831–1879)
Mbokomu Mons	15.1°S 215.2°E	460	(1)	Mbokomu, ancestor goddess of the Ngombe (Zaire)
Melia Mons	62.8°N 119.3°E	311	(1)	Greek nymph
Mem Loimis Mons	9.5°N 209.0°E	300	(1)	Wintun (California) goddess
Mertseger Mons	38.1°S 270.3°E	450	(1)	Mertseger，Snake goddess of the Theban Necropolis
Metis Mons	71.0°N 253.0°E	920	(1)	Greek Titaness
Mielikki Mons	27.8°S 280.5°E	450	(1)	Mielikki, Finnish forest goddess
Milda Mons	52.5°N 159.4°E	48	(1)	Milda, Lithuanian goddess of love
Mokosha Mons	57.7°N 255.0°E	270	(1)	East Slavic main goddess
Muhongo Mons	10.6°N 174.5°E	175	(1)	Mbundu (Angola) ancestor deity
Muta Mons	55.5°N 358.3°E	54	(1)	Roman goddess of silence
Nahas-tsan Mons	14.0°N 205.0°E	500	(1)	Navajo Mother Earth
Nayunuwi Montes	2.0°N 83.0°E	900	(1)	Cherokee stone-clad female monster
Nazit Mons	22.5°N 240.0°E	350	(1)	Nazit, Egyptian winged serpent goddess
Ne Ngam Mons	43.0°S 257.5°E	200	(1)	Lao world creator goddess
Nepthys Mons	33.0°S 317.5°E	350	(1)	Nepthys, Egyptian goddess of barren lands
Nijole Mons	45.0°N 185.0°E	150	(1)	Lithuanian underworld goddess. Spelling changed from Niola Mons.
Ninisinna Mons	25.7°N 197.5°E	110	(1)	Mesopotamian goddess of health and healing
Nokomis Montes	20.0°N 189.0°E	486	(1)	Algonquin (N. America) earth mother
Nyx Mons	30.0°N 48.5°E	875	(1)	Nyx, Greek goddess of night
Ongwuti Mons	2.0°S 194.5°E	500	(1)	Hopi salt-woman deity who predicts seasons
Ozza Mons	4.5°N 201.0°E	507	(1)	Persian goddess honored by the Qurayshies
Pahto Mons	64.5°S 114.5°E	300	(1)	Yakima/Klickitat (NW Coast) mountain deity
Polik-mana Mons	24.5°N 264.0°E	600	(1)	Polik-mana, Hopi butterfly maiden ('kachina')
Ptesanwi Mons	2.8°N 45.4°E	200	(1)	Ptesanwi, Lakota (Sioux) White Buffalo Woman
Rakapila Mons	43.7°S 321.5°E	130	(1)	Malagasy (Madagascar) sacred tree deity
Renpet Mons	76.0°N 236.2°E	300	(1)	Renpet, Egyptian goddess of springtime and youth
Rhea Mons	32.4°N 282.2°E	217	(1)	Greek Titaness
Rhpisunt Mons	2.5°N 301.5°E	250	(1)	Haida (NW Coast) Bear Mother deity
Sakwap-mana Mons	35.0°N 219.5°E	500	(1)	Hopi maiden of blue corn ('kachina')
Samodiva Mons	13.6°N 291.0°E	200	(1)	Bulgarian winged water deity
Sapas Mons	8.5°N 188.3°E	217	(1)	Canaanite sun goddess
Sarasvati Mons	75.7°N 354.5°E	200	(1)	Saraswati, Hindu river goddess
Sekmet Mons	44.5°N 240.5°E	285	(1)	Sekmet, Ancient Egyptian goddess of war and battle
Sephira Mons	43.0°S 28.0°E	275	(1)	Spanish goddess of intelligence and creativity
Shala Mons	39.4°N 208.0°E	90	(1)	Shala, Canaanite storm goddess
Siduri Mons	42.3°S 297.3°E	105	(1)	Siduri, Babylonian goddess of wine and wisdom
Sif Mons	22.0°N 352.4°E	200	(1)	Sif, Teutonic goddess; Thor's wife
Somagalags Montes	9.3°N 348.5°E	105	(1)	Bella Coola earth mother. Name changed from Somagalags Corona.
Spandarmat Mons	16.5°S 255.0°E	400	(1)	Iranian mother goddess
Talakin Mons	11.0°S 355.4°E	175	(1)	Navajo (USA) goddess
Tefnut Mons	38.6°S 304.0°E	182	(1)	Ancient Egyptian goddess of dew or rain
Tepev Mons	29.0°N 44.3°E	301	(1)	Quiche Mayan creator goddess
Thallo Mons	76.0°N 233.5°E	216	(1)	Thallo, Greek goddess of vegetation flowering (Spring Hora)
Theia Mons	22.7°N 281.0°E	226	(1)	Greek Titaness
Toma Mons	12.9°S 232.0°E	80	(1)	Tibetan goddess of intelligence and creativity
Tsʻan Nu Mons	27.2°S 272.9°E	310	(1)	Chinese goddess of silkworms
Tuli Mons	13.3°N 314.6°E	750	(1)	Samoan goddess of creation
Tuulikki Mons	10.3°N 274.7°E	520	(1)	Finnish wood goddess
Tuzandi Mons	42.5°S 41.5°E	200	(1)	Palaun (Mon-Khmer of Burma/Myanmar) ancestor deity
Ua-ogrere Mons	40.5°N 117.0°E	200	(1)	Kivai (New Guinea) ancestor deity, oldest woman who "ever existed"
Uretsete Mons	12.0°S 261.0°E	500	(1)	Keresan Pueblo ancestor goddess
Ushas Mons	24.3°S 324.6°E	413	(1)	Ushas, Hindu goddess of dawn
Uti Hiata Mons	16.0°N 69.0°E	500	(1)	Pawnee Mother Corn deity
Var Mons	1.2°N 316.2°E	1000	(1)	Scandinavian love goddess
Venilia Mons	32.7°N 238.8°E	320	(1)	Venilia, Roman divinity associated with the winds and sea
Vostrukha Mons	6.3°S 299.4°E	180	(1)	Belarusian deity of home
Waka Mons	26.3°N 207.7°E	60	(1)	Waka, Polynesian lizard goddess
Wyrd Mons	14.0°N 247.2°E	150	(1)	Wyrd, Anglo-Saxon weaving goddess
Xochiquetzal Mons	3.5°N 270.0°E	80	(1)	Xochiquetzal, Aztec goddess of flowers
Xtoh Mons	39.7°N 194.2°E	110	(1)	Quiche (Guatemala) goddess of weather and rain
Yolkai-Estsan Mons	17.0°N 194.0°E	600	(1)	Navajo myth female deity
Yunya-mana Mons	18.0°S 285.0°E	500	(1)	Hopi prickly pear cactus maiden
Zaltu Mons	18.0°N 163.5°E	220	(1)	Assyro-Babylonian goddess

Key

- DIAM — Longest dimension of feature in kilometres
- AS — Approval status
  - (1) — Adopted by the International Astronomical Union (IAU) General Assembly
  - (2) — Working Group for Planetary System Nomenclature (WGPSN) approval
  - (3) — Dropped, no longer in use

== See also ==
- Skadi Mons, formerly thought to be the tallest mountain on Venus
- Venusian geography
- Volcanism on Venus
- List of coronae on Venus
- List of craters on Venus
- List of tallest mountains in the Solar System
- List of mountains on Mars by height
