= Geology of Venus =

Geology of second planet from the Sun

Radar global map of the surface of Venus

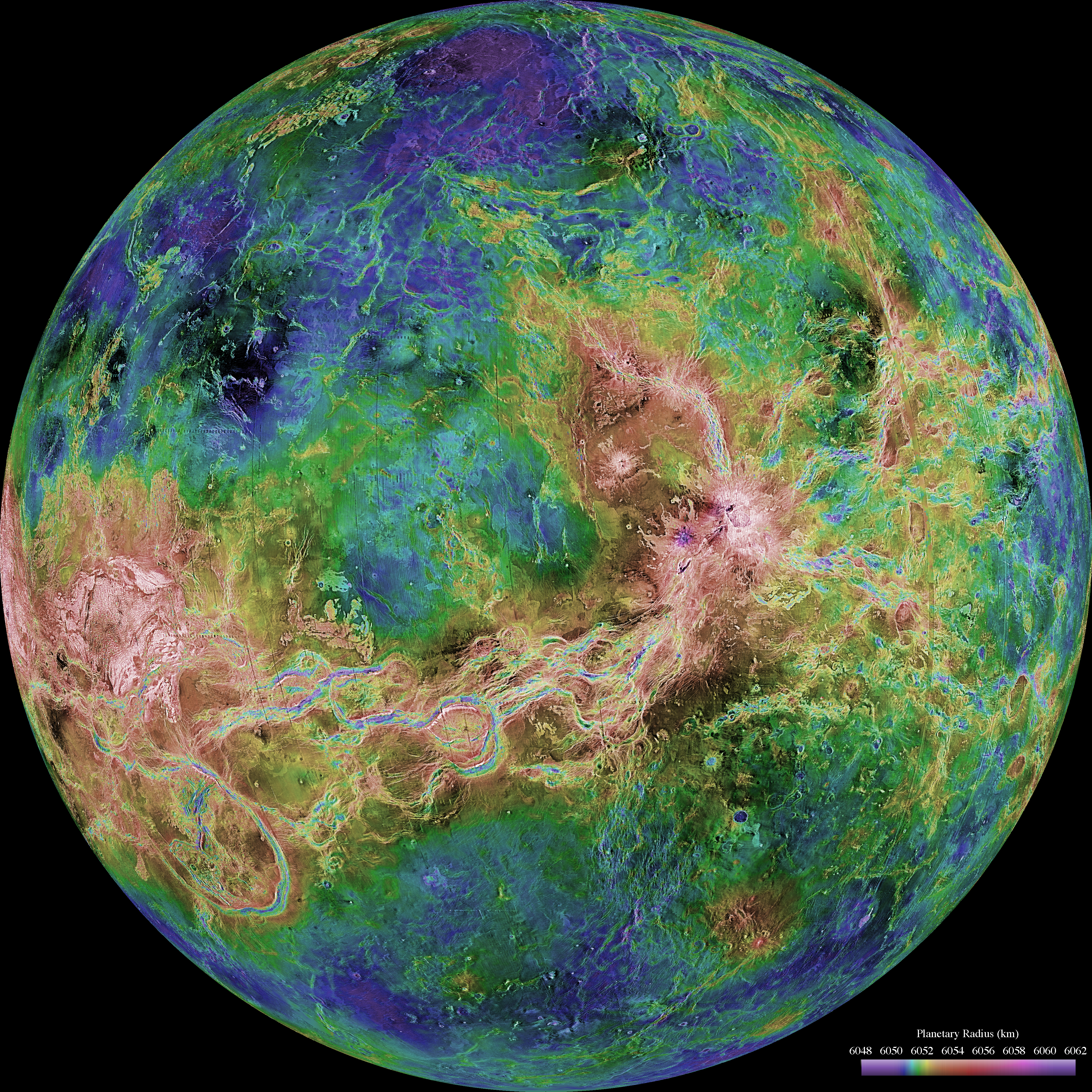
The hemispheric view of Venus, as revealed by more than a decade of radar investigations culminating in the 1990–1994 Magellan mission, is centered at 180 degrees east longitude.

The geology of Venus is the scientific study of the surface, crust, and interior of the planet Venus. Within the Solar System, it is the one nearest to Earth and most like it in terms of mass, but has no intrinsic magnetic field or recognizable plate tectonics. About 75% of the surface is composed of bare rock, predominantly volcanic bedrock, some with thin and patchy layers of regolith. This is in marked contrast with Earth, the Moon, and Mars. Some impact craters are present, but the vast majority of the surface is uncratered. This is due in part to the thickness of the Venusian atmosphere disrupting small impactors before they strike the ground, but the paucity of large craters may be due to volcanic re-surfacing, possibly of a catastrophic nature. Volcanism appears to be the dominant agent of geological change on Venus. Some of the volcanic landforms appear to be unique to the planet, such as arachnoids and pancake domes. There are shield and composite volcanoes similar to those found on Earth, although these volcanoes are significantly shorter than those found on Earth or Mars. Given that Venus has approximately the same size, density, and composition as Earth, it is plausible that volcanism may be continuing on the planet today, as demonstrated by recent studies.

Most of the Venusian surface is relatively flat; it is divided into three general topographic units: lowlands, highlands, and plains. In the early days of radar observation the highlands drew comparisons to the continents of Earth, but modern research has shown that this is superficial and the absence of plate tectonics makes this comparison misleading. Tectonic features are present to a limited extent, including linear "deformation belts" composed of folds and faults. These may be caused by mantle convection. Many of the tectonic features such as tesserae (large regions of highly deformed terrain, folded and fractured in two or three dimensions), and arachnoids (those features resembling a spider's web) are associated with volcanism.

Eolian landforms are not widespread on the planet's surface, but there is considerable evidence the planet's atmosphere causes the chemical weathering of rock, especially at high elevations. The planet is remarkably dry, with only a chemical trace of water vapor (20 ppm) in the Venusian atmosphere. No landforms indicative of past water or ice are visible in radar images of the surface. The atmosphere shows isotopic evidence of having been stripped of volatile elements by off-gassing and solar wind erosion over time, implying the possibility that Venus may have had liquid water at some point in the distant past; no direct evidence for this has been found. Much speculation about the geological history of Venus continues today.

The surface of Venus is not easily accessible because of the extreme conditions and permanent cloud cover, a thick atmosphere of over 90 bar and temperatures reaching 470 °C (878 °F) severely limit the lifespan of any probe to land on the surface. Much of what is known about it stems from orbital radar observations, because the surface is permanently obscured in visible wavelengths by cloud cover. In addition, a number of landers have returned data from the surface, including images from the Venera probes.

Studies reported in October 2023 suggest for the first time that Venus may have had plate tectonics during ancient times and, as a result, may have had a more habitable environment, possibly once capable of harboring life forms.

== Topography ==
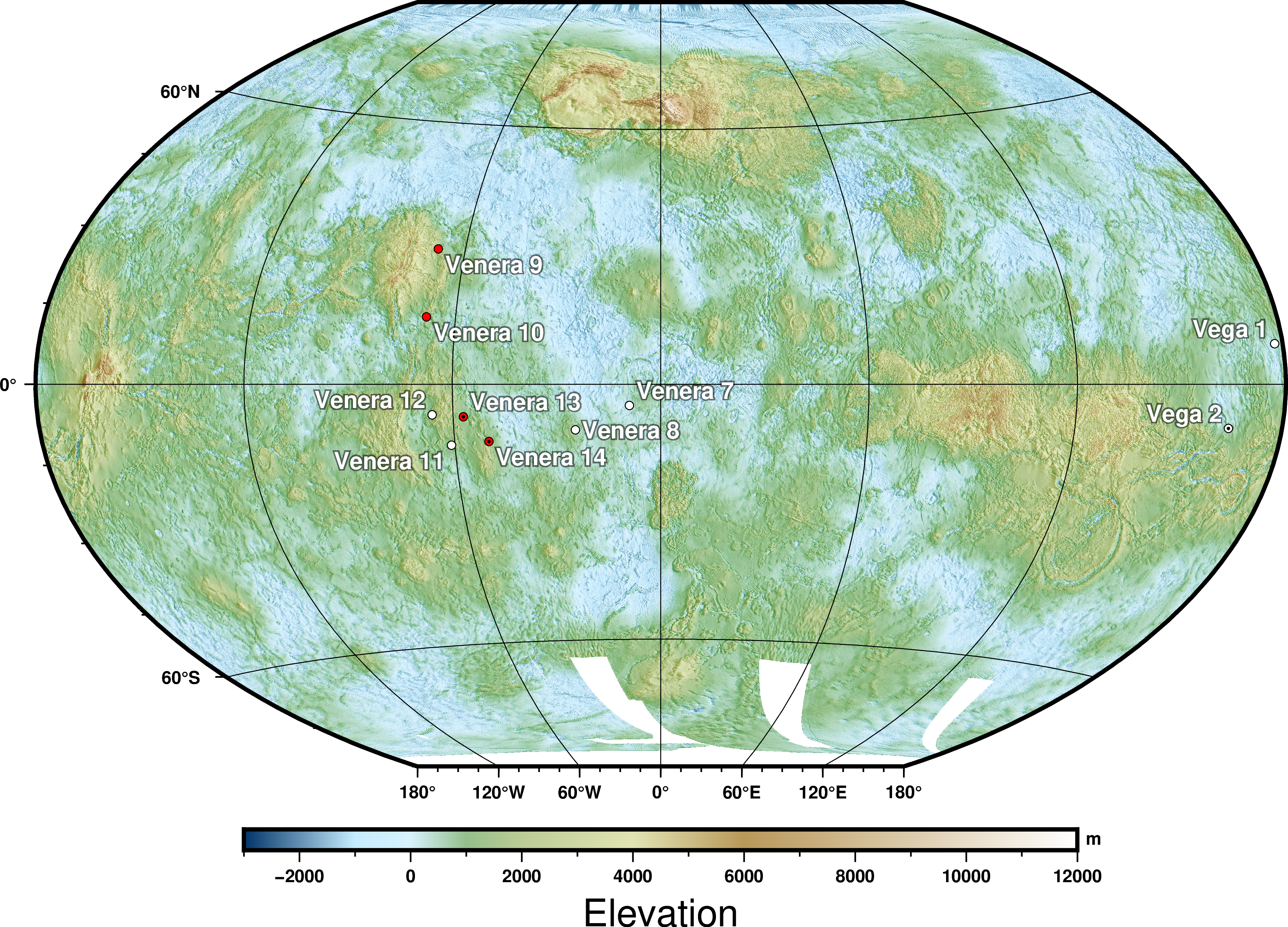
Venus topography

The surface of Venus is comparatively flat. When 93% of the topography was mapped by Pioneer Venus Orbiter, scientists found that the total distance from the lowest point to the highest point on the entire surface was about 13 kilometres (8.1 mi), about the same as the vertical distance between the Earth's ocean floor and the higher summits of the Himalayas. This similarity is to be expected as the maximum attainable elevation contrasts on a planet are largely dictated by the strength of the planet's gravity and the mechanical strength of its lithosphere, these are similar for Earth and Venus.

According to data from the Pioneer Venus Orbiter altimeters, nearly 51% of the surface is located within 500 meters (1,600 feet) of the median radius of 6,052 km (3,761 mi); only 2% of the surface is located at elevations greater than 2 kilometres (1.2 mi) from the median radius. This gives Venus a very sharp hypsometry.

The altimetry experiment of Magellan confirmed the general character of the landscape. According to the Magellan data, 80% of the topography is within 1 km (0.62 mi) of the median radius. The most important elevations are in the mountain chains that surround Lakshmi Planum: Maxwell Montes (11 km, 6.8 mi), Akna Montes (7 km, 4.3 mi) and Freya Montes (7 km, 4.3 mi). Despite the relatively flat landscape of Venus, the altimetry data also found large inclined plains. Such is the case on the southwest side of Maxwell Montes, which in some parts seems to be inclined some 45°. Inclinations of 30° were registered in Danu Montes and Themis Regio.

=== Highlands ===
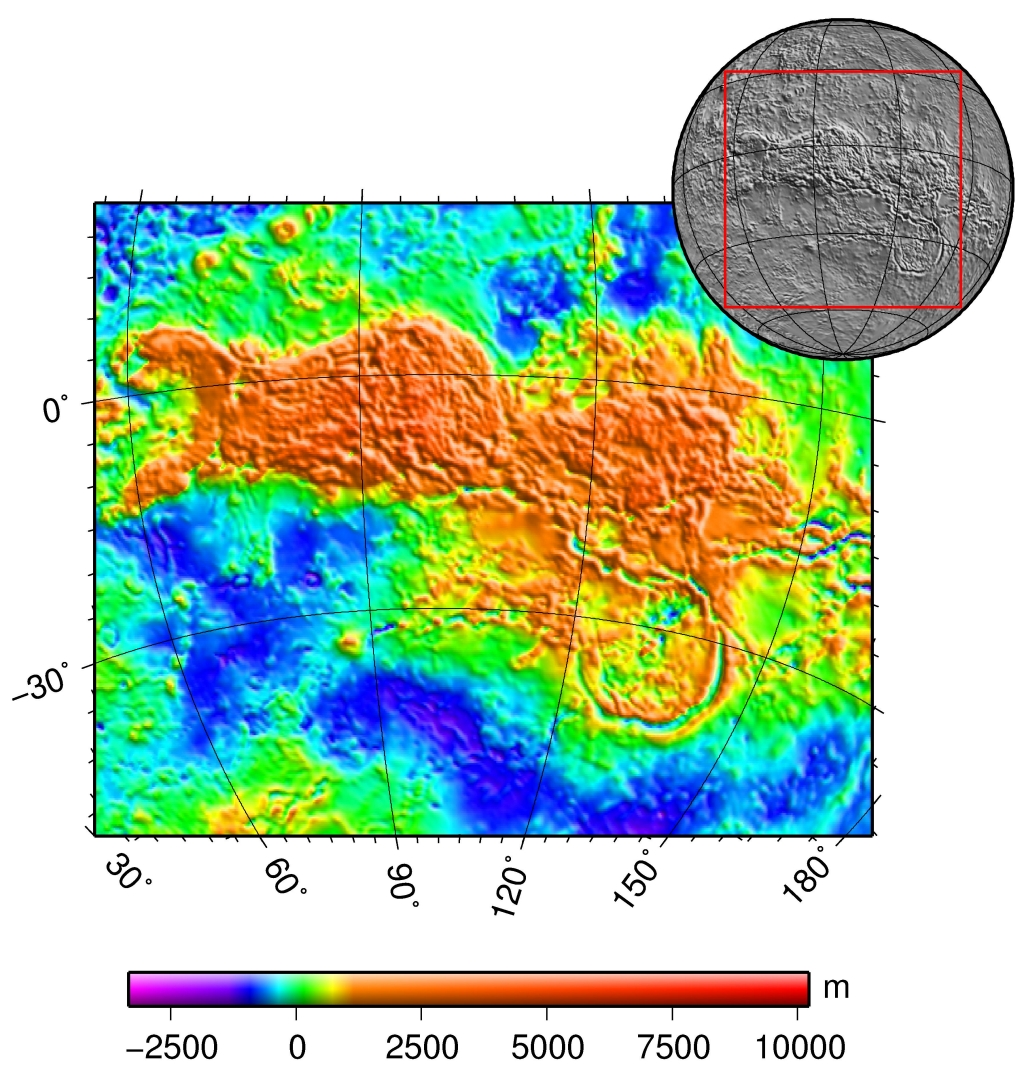
Aphrodite Terra topography

Highlands cover about 10% of the planet's surface, with highlands being defined as areas greater than 2 km (1.2 mi) in elevation. The largest provinces of highlands are Aphrodite Terra, Ishtar Terra, and Lada Terra, as well as the regions Beta Regio, Phoebe Regio and Themis Regio. The regions Alpha Regio, Bell Regio, Eistla Regio and Tholus Regio are smaller regions of highlands.

Some of the terrain in these areas is particularly efficient at reflecting radar signals, appearing bright in synthetic aperture radar imagery. This is possibly analogous to snow lines on Earth and is likely related to temperatures and pressures there being lower than in the other provinces due to the higher elevation, which allows for distinct mineralogy to occur. (Note: On Venus, for every kilometer of gain in elevation, the average temperature drops by about 8 K, so that the average temperature difference between the top of Maxwell Montes and the lowest basins is about 100 K. This dwarfs the average differences in temperature due to latitudes as well as the day-side and night-side temperature differences, both of which are hardly more than 2 K.) It is thought that high-elevation rock formations may contain or be coated by minerals that have high dielectric constants. The high dielectric minerals would be stable at the ambient temperatures in the highlands, but not on the plains that comprise the rest of the planet's surface. Pyrite, an iron sulfide, matches these criteria and is widely suspected as a possible cause; it would be produced by chemical weathering of the volcanic highlands after long-term exposure to the sulfur-bearing Venusian atmosphere. The presence of pyrite on Venus has been contested, with atmospheric modelling showing that it might not be stable under Venusian atmospheric conditions. Other hypotheses have been put forward to explain the higher radar reflectivity in the highlands, including the presence of a ferroelectric material whose dielectric constant changes with temperature (with Venus having a changing temperature gradient with elevation). It has been observed that the character of the radar-bright highlands is not consistent across the surface of Venus. For example, Maxwell Montes shows the sharp, snow line-like change in reflectivity that is consistent with a change in mineralogy, whereas Ovda Regio shows a more gradual brightening upwards trend. The brightening upwards trend on Ovda Regio is consistent with a ferroelectric signature, and has been suggested to indicate the presence of chlorapatite.

=== Deposition plains ===
Deposition plains have elevations averaging 0 to 2 km and cover more than half of the planet's surface.

=== Lowlands ===
The rest of the surface is lowlands and generally lies below zero elevation. Radar reflectivity data suggest that at a centimeter scale these areas are smooth, potentially as a result of sedimentary accumulation over longer timespans.

== Surface observations ==
Ten spacecraft have successfully landed on Venus and returned data; all were flown by the Soviet Union. Venera 9, 10, 13, and 14 had cameras and returned images of regolith and rock. Spectrophotometry results showed that these four missions kicked up dust clouds on landing, which means that some of the dust particles must be smaller than about 0.02 mm. The rocks at all four sites showed fine layers, some layers were more reflective than others. Experiments on rocks at the Venera 13 and 14 sites found that they were porous and easily crushed (bearing maximum loads of 0.3 to 1 MPa) (Note: 0.3 MPa is about the amount of pressure exerted by water flowing out of a typical garden hose. 1 MPa is just under the pressure of the average human bite.) these rocks may be weakly lithified sediments or volcanic tuff. Spectrometry found that the surface materials at the Venera 9, 10, 14 and Vega 1 and 2 landing had chemical compositions similar to tholeiitic basalts, while the Venera 8 and 13 sites chemically resembled alkaline basalts.

== Impact craters and age estimates of the surface ==
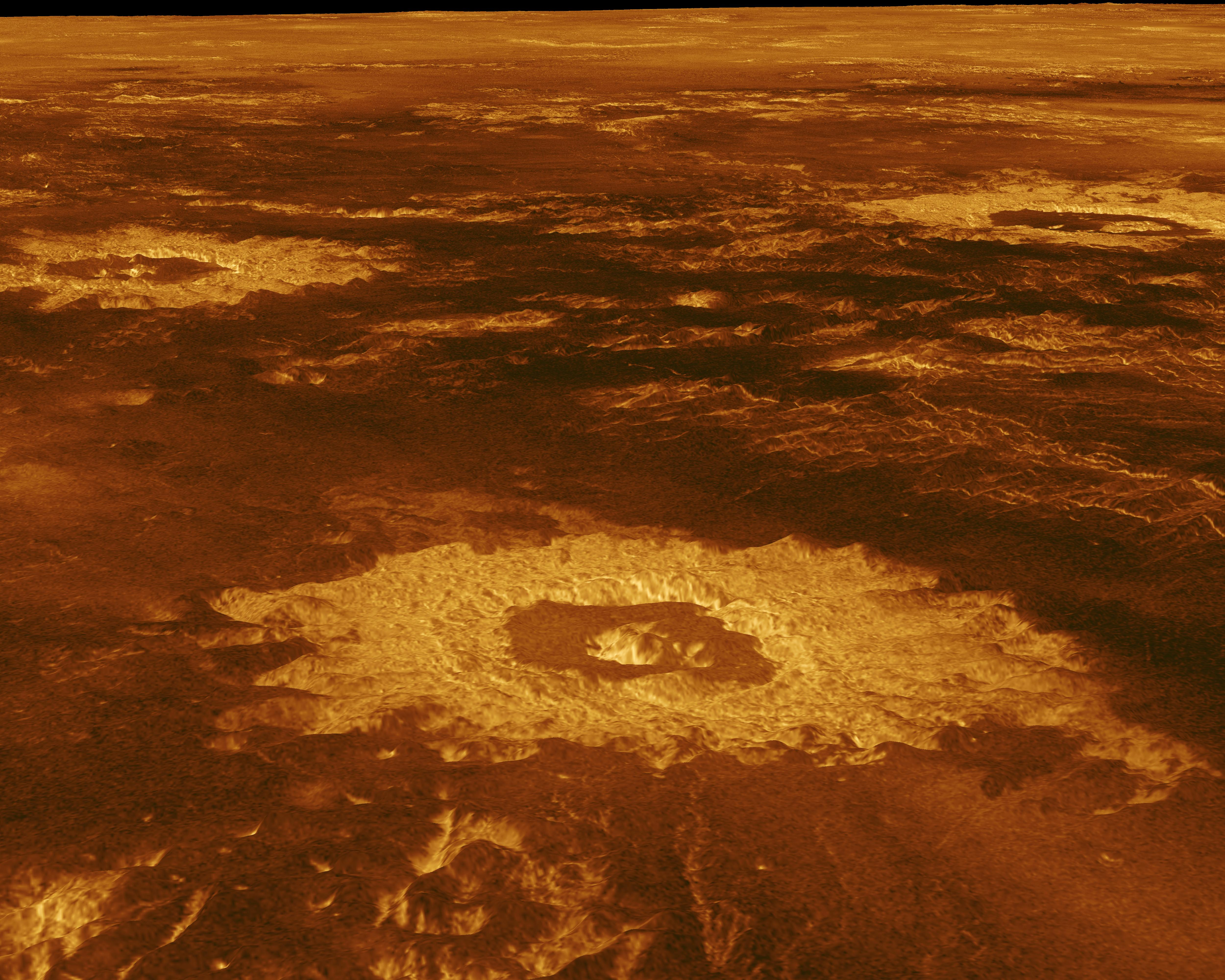
Radar image of Danilova crater in relief

Earth-based radar surveys made it possible to identify some topographic patterns related to craters, and the Venera 15 and Venera 16 probes identified almost 150 such features of probable impact origin. Global coverage from Magellan subsequently made it possible to identify nearly 900 impact craters.

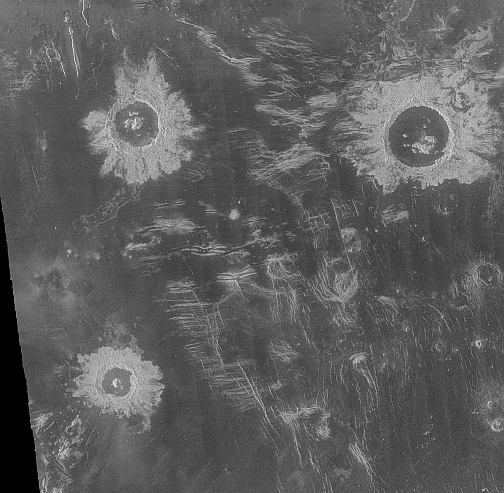
Danilova, Aglaonice and Saskja craters

Compared to Mercury, the Moon and other such bodies, Venus has very few craters. In part, this is because Venus's dense atmosphere burns up smaller meteorites before they hit the surface. The Venera and Magellan data are in agreement: there are very few impact craters with a diameter less than 30 kilometres (19 mi), and data from Magellan show an absence of any craters less than 2 kilometres (1.2 mi) in diameter. The small craters are irregular and appear in groups, thus pointing to the deceleration and the breakup of impactors. However, there are also fewer of the large craters, and those appear relatively young; they are rarely filled with lava, showing that they were formed after volcanic activity in the area ceased, and radar data indicates that they are rough and have not had time to be eroded down.

Compared to the situation on bodies such as the Moon, it is more difficult to determine the ages of different areas of the surface on Venus, on the basis of crater counts, due to the small number of craters at hand. However, the surface characteristics are consistent with a completely random distribution, implying that the surface of the entire planet is roughly the same age, or at least that very large areas are not very different in age from the average.

Taken together, this evidence suggests that the surface of Venus is geologically young. The impact crater distribution appears to be most consistent with models that call for a near-complete resurfacing of the planet. Subsequent to this period of extreme activity, process rates declined and impact craters began to accumulate, with only minor modification and resurfacing since.

== Global resurfacing event ==
Age estimates based on crater counts indicate a young surface, in contrast to the much older surfaces of Mars, Mercury, and the Moon. (Note: Dating geological formations by crater counting is a long established and relatively inexpensive mainstay of planetary science. No rock from Venus has ever been dated using laboratory methods, as no meteorites from Venus are known and no spacecraft have ever returned samples from the planet to the Earth. The planet's considerable gravity and thick atmosphere mean this is unlikely to change in the near future.) For this to be the case on a planet without crustal recycling by plate tectonics requires explanation. One hypothesis is that Venus underwent some sort of global resurfacing about 300–500 million years ago that erased the evidence of older craters.

One possible explanation for this event is that it is part of a cyclic process on Venus. On Earth, plate tectonics allows heat to escape from the mantle by advection, the transport of mantle material to the surface and the return of old crust to the mantle. But Venus has no evidence of plate tectonics, so this theory states that the interior of the planet heats up (due to the decay of radioactive elements) until material in the mantle is hot enough to force its way to the surface. The subsequent resurfacing event covers most or all of the planet with lava, until the mantle is cool enough for the process to start over.

There are several different hypotheses about a Venusian global resurfacing event. The catastrophic resurfacing hypothesis proposes that Venus underwent a planet-wide geologic event that replaced most of its surface over a short period of time. This hypothesis is motivated by the relatively uniform crater distribution and lack of regions with significantly older terrains, suggesting that Venus's surface was globally renewed in a synchronous episode. In this scenario, internal heat would accumulate beneath a stagnant lithosphere over hundreds of millions of years due to the absence of plate tectonics. Once a critical thermal threshold was reached, a large volume of magma would be released, causing extensive volcanic resurfacing and tectonic deformation.

To support this hypothesis, analyses of the craters as well as crater-counting has shown that the crater retention age of the surface is uniform across the planet. Since there is also near-random distribution of the almost 1,000 impact craters identified on Venus, this displays lack of clustering which is expected from a steady resurfacing process. These observations are consistent with a short-duration global event.

The equilibrium resurfacing hypothesis challenges the idea of a sudden global event and posits that Venus has experienced continuous or quasi-continuous volcanic and tectonic resurfacing throughout its history. This model states that craters are either gradually buried, deformed, or erased over long periods of time by volcanic activity, leading to an apparently homogeneous crater population.

Recognizing limitations in both models, there has been recent work that proposes hybrid resurfacing scenarios. These scenarios combine aspects of both catastrophic and equilibrium processes. In these models, resurfacing may occur in pulses: brief episodes of intense volcanic activity separated by longer periods of dormancy. These episodic events might be global in extent or regionally focused, and over geologic time could produce the observed crater distribution without requiring a single catastrophic resurfacing phase.

Recent radar data and modeling suggest that Venus may still be geologically active. Potential volcanic activity at sites like Maat Mons could point to ongoing resurfacing processes, favoring the equilibrium or hybrid resurfacing scenarios. Modeling of Venusian mantle dynamics under a stagnant-lid regime also displays periodic heat buildup and release that could naturally result in non-steady resurfacing behavior.

== Volcanoes ==
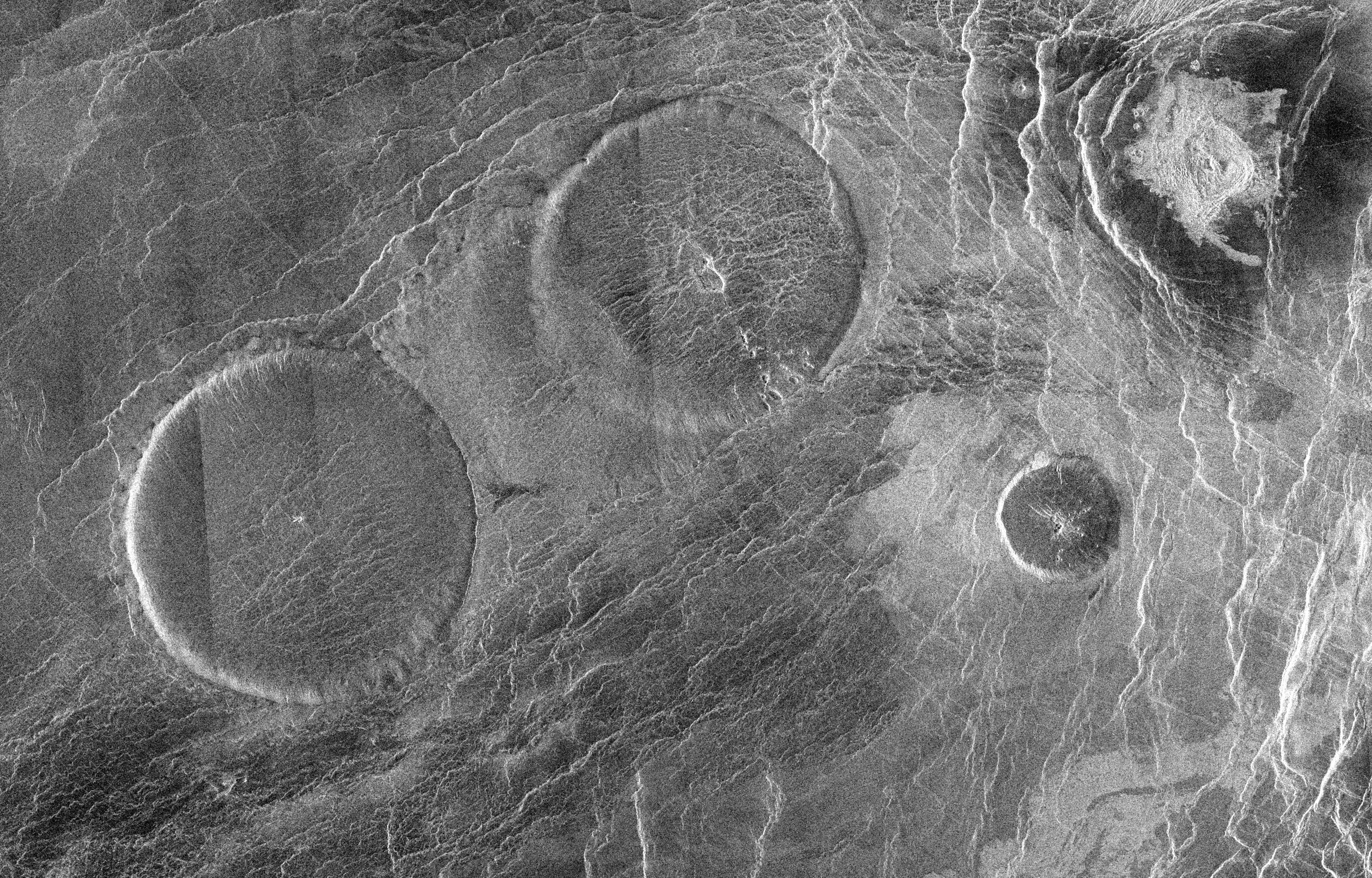
Radar image of pancake domes in Venus's Eistla region. The two larger ones are approximately 65 km (40 mi) wide and rise less than 1 km (0.62 mi) above the surrounding plain. These wide and fairly low, flat-topped volcanoes are a type of landform that is unique to Venus. They were probably formed by extrusions of highly viscous lava that was too sticky to flow very far down-slope from their vents.

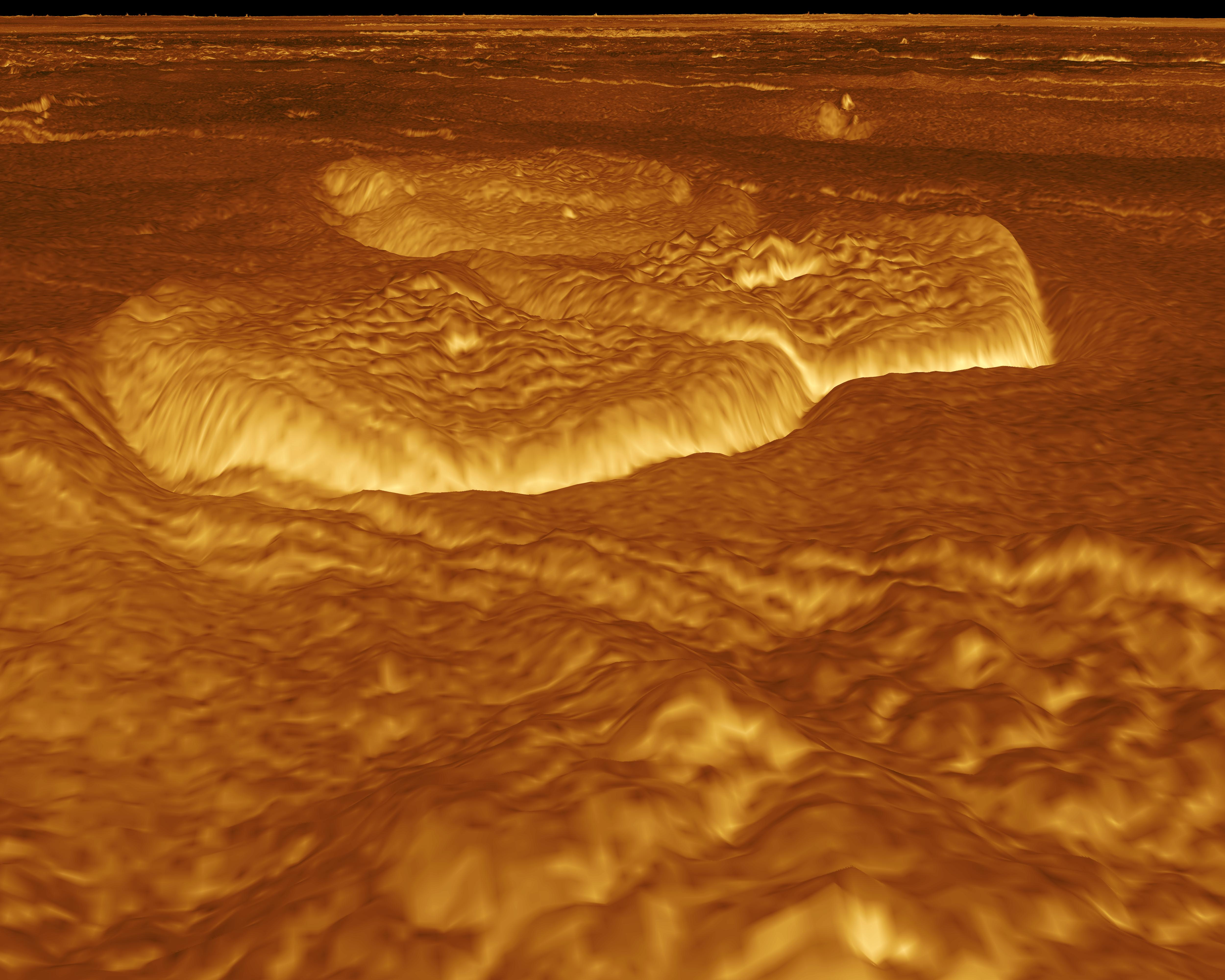
Computer generated perspective view of pancake domes in Venus's Alpha Regio. The domes in this image are up to 750 m high and average 25 km in diameter.

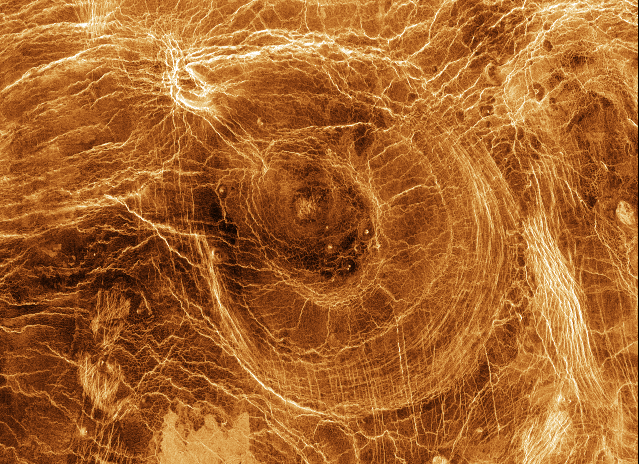
Arachnoid surface feature on Venus

The surface of Venus is dominated by volcanism. Although Venus is superficially similar to Earth, it seems that the tectonic plates so active in Earth's geology do not exist on Venus. About 80% of the planet consists of a mosaic of volcanic lava plains, dotted with more than a hundred large isolated shield volcanoes, and many hundreds of smaller volcanoes and volcanic constructs such as coronae. These are geological features believed to be almost unique to Venus: huge, ring-shaped structures 100–300 kilometers (62–186 miles) across and rising hundreds of meters above the surface. The only other place they have been discovered is on Uranus's moon Miranda. It is believed that they are formed when plumes of rising hot material in the mantle push the crust upwards into a dome shape, which then collapses in the centre as the molten lava cools and leaks out at the sides, leaving a crown-like structure: the corona.

Differences can be seen in volcanic deposits. In many cases, volcanic activity is localized to a fixed source, and deposits are found in the vicinity of this source. This kind of volcanism is called "centralized volcanism," in that volcanoes and other geographic features form distinct regions. The second type of volcanic activity is not radial or centralized; flood basalts cover wide expanses of the surface, similar to features such as the Deccan Traps on Earth. These eruptions result in "flow type" volcanoes.

Volcanoes less than 20 kilometres (12 mi) in diameter are very abundant on Venus and they may number hundreds of thousands or even millions. Many appear as flattened domes or 'pancakes', thought to be formed in a similar way to shield volcanoes on Earth. (Note: But note the contrast: shield volcanism on Earth is associated with low viscosity lava, whereas Venusian domes are caused by very high viscosity, gummy lavas.) These pancake dome volcanoes are fairly round features that are less than 1-kilometre (0.62 mi) in height and many times that in width. It is common to find groups of hundreds of these volcanoes in areas called shield fields. The domes of Venus are between 10 and 100 times larger than those formed on Earth. They are usually associated with "coronae" and tesserae. The pancakes are thought to be formed by highly viscous, silica-rich lava erupting under Venus's high atmospheric pressure. Domes called scalloped margin domes (commonly called ticks because they appear as domes with numerous legs), are thought to have undergone mass wasting events such as landslides on their margins. Sometimes deposits of debris can be seen scattered around them.

On Venus, volcanoes are mainly of the shield type. Nevertheless, the morphology of the shield volcanoes of Venus is different from shield volcanoes on Earth. On the Earth, shield volcanoes can be a few tens of kilometers wide and up to 10 kilometers high (6.2 mi) in the case of Mauna Kea, measured from the sea floor. On Venus, these volcanoes can cover hundreds of kilometers in area, but they are relatively flat, with an average height of 1.5 kilometres (0.93 mi).

Other unique features of Venus's surface are novae (radial networks of dikes or grabens) and arachnoids. A nova is formed when large quantities of magma are extruded onto the surface to form radiating ridges and trenches which are highly reflective to radar. These dikes form a symmetrical network around the central point where the lava emerged, where there may also be a depression caused by the collapse of the magma chamber.

Arachnoids are so named because they resemble a spider's web, featuring several concentric ovals surrounded by a complex network of radial fractures similar to those of a nova. It is not known whether the 250 or so features identified as arachnoids actually share a common origin, or are the result of different geological processes.

== Tectonic activity ==
Despite the fact that Venus appears to have no global plate tectonic system as such, the planet's surface shows various features associated with local tectonic activity. Features such as faults, folds, and volcanoes are present there and may be driven largely by processes in the mantle.

The active volcanism of Venus has generated chains of folded mountains, rift valleys, and terrain known as tesserae, a word meaning "floor tiles" in Greek. Tesserae exhibit the effects of eons of compression and tensional deformation.

Unlike those on Earth, the deformations on Venus are directly related to regional dynamic forces within the planet's mantle. Gravitational studies suggest that Venus differs from Earth in lacking an asthenosphere—a layer of lower viscosity and mechanical weakness that allows Earth's crustal tectonic plates to move. The apparent absence of this layer on Venus suggests that the deformation of the Venusian surface must be explained by convective movements within the planet's mantle.

The tectonic deformations on Venus occur on a variety of scales, the smallest of which are related to linear fractures or faults. In many areas these faults appear as networks of parallel lines. Small, discontinuous mountain crests are found which resemble those on the Moon and Mars. The effects of extensive tectonism are shown by the presence of normal faults, where the crust has sunk in one area relative to the surrounding rock, and superficial fractures. Radar imaging shows that these types of deformation are concentrated in belts located in the equatorial zones and at high southern latitudes. These belts are hundreds of kilometers wide and appear to interconnect across the whole of the planet, forming a global network associated with the distribution of volcanoes.

The rifts of Venus, formed by the expansion of the lithosphere, are groups of depressions tens to hundreds of meters wide and extending up to 1,000 km (620 mi) in length. The rifts are mostly associated with large volcanic elevations in the form of domes, such as those at Beta Regio, Atla Regio and the western part of Eistla Regio. These highlands seem to be the result of enormous mantle plumes (rising currents of magma) which have caused elevation, fracturing, faulting, and volcanism.

The highest mountain chain on Venus, Maxwell Montes in Ishtar Terra, was formed by processes of compression, expansion, and lateral movement. Another type of geographical feature, found in the lowlands, consists of ridge belts elevated several meters above the surface, hundreds of kilometers wide and thousands of kilometers long. Two major concentrations of these belts exist: one in Lavinia Planitia near the southern pole, and the second adjacent to Atalanta Planitia near the northern pole.

Tesserae are found mainly in Aphrodite Terra, Alpha Regio, Tellus Regio and the eastern part of Ishtar Terra (Fortuna Tessera). These regions contain the superimposition and intersection of grabens of different geological units, indicating that these are the oldest parts of the planet. It was once thought that the tesserae were continents associated with tectonic plates like those of the Earth; in reality they are probably the result of floods of basaltic lava forming large plains, which were then subjected to intense tectonic fracturing.

Nonetheless, studies reported on 26 October 2023 suggest that Venus, for the first time, may have had plate tectonics during ancient times. As a result, Venus may have had a more habitable environment, and possibly once capable of life forms.

== Magnetic field and internal structure ==
Cutaway diagram of possible internal structure

Venus's crust appears to be 20–25 kilometres (12–16 mi) thick on average, and composed of mafic silicate rocks. Venus's mantle is approximately 2,840 kilometres (1,760 mi) thick, its chemical composition is probably similar to that of chondrites. Since Venus is a terrestrial planet, it is presumed to have a core, made of semisolid iron and nickel with a radius of approximately 3,000 kilometres (1,900 mi).

The unavailability of seismic data from Venus severely limits what can be definitely known about the structure of the planet's mantle, but models of Earth's mantle have been modified to make predictions. It is expected that the uppermost mantle, from about 70 to 480 kilometres (43 to 298 mi) deep is mostly made of the mineral olivine. Descending through the mantle, the chemical composition remains largely the same but at somewhere between about 480 and 760 kilometres (300 and 470 mi), the increasing pressure causes the crystal structure of olivine to change to the more densely packed structure of spinel. Another transition occurs between 760 and 1,000 kilometres (470 and 620 mi) deep, where the material takes on the progressively more compact crystal structures of ilmenite and perovskite, and gradually becomes more like perovskite until the core boundary is reached.

Venus is similar to Earth in size and density, and so probably also in bulk composition, but it does not have a significant magnetic field. Earth's magnetic field is produced by what is known as the core dynamo, consisting of an electrically conducting liquid, the nickel-iron outer core that rotates and is convecting. Venus is expected to have an electrically conductive core of similar composition, and although its rotation period is very long (243.7 Earth days), simulations show that this is adequate to produce a dynamo. This implies that Venus lacks convection in its outer core. Convection occurs when there is a large difference in temperature between the inner and outer part of the core, but since Venus has no plate tectonics to let off heat from the mantle, it is possible that outer core convection is being suppressed by a warm mantle. It is also possible that Venus may lack a solid inner core for the same reason, if the core is either too hot or is not under enough pressure to allow molten nickel-iron to freeze there. (Note: If there is no gradually freezing inner core, then there is no release of the latent heat of crystallization there to steepen the temperature gradient and increase convection.)

== Lava flows and channels ==
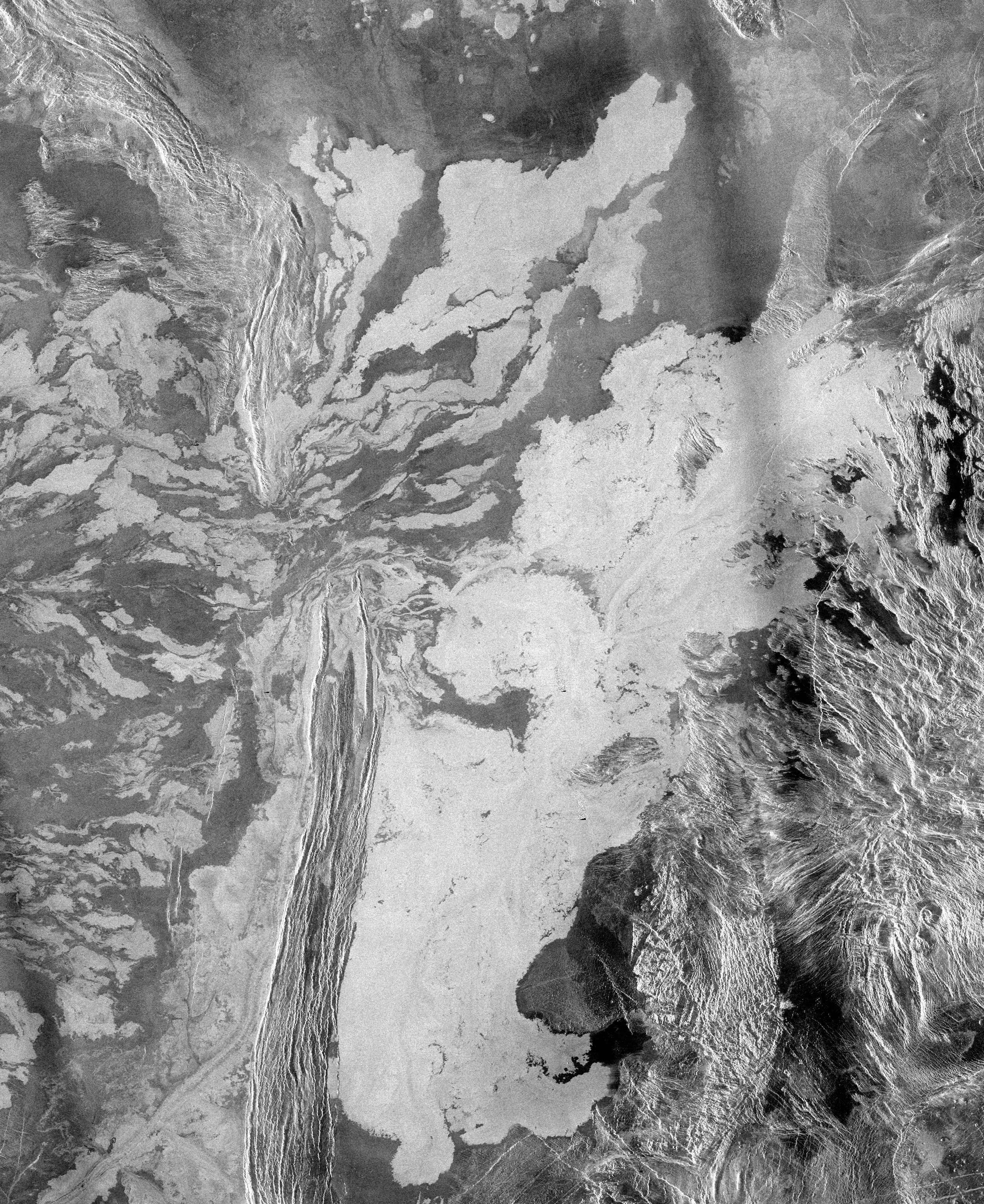
Lava originating from Ammavaru caldera (300 km outside the image) overflowed the ridge left of center and pooled to its right.

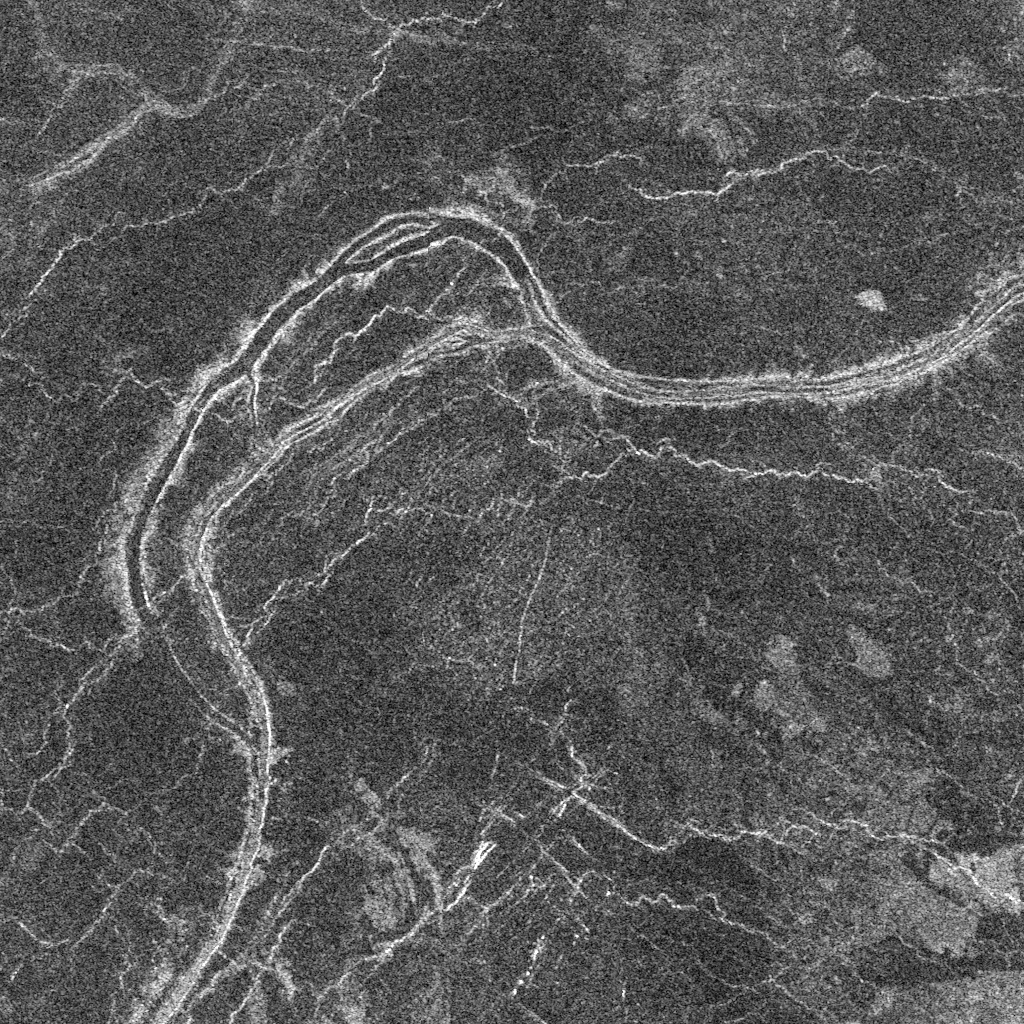
An anastomosing 2-km-wide lava channel in Sedna Planitia

Lava flows on Venus are often much larger than Earth's, up to several hundred kilometers long and tens of kilometers wide. It is still unknown why these lava fields or lobate flows reach such sizes, but it is suggested that they are the result of very large eruptions of basaltic, low-viscosity lava spreading out to form wide, flat plains.

On Earth, there are two known types of basaltic lava: ʻaʻa and pāhoehoe. ʻAʻa lava presents a rough texture in the shape of broken blocks (clinkers). Pāhoehoe lava is recognized by its pillowy or ropy appearance. Rough surfaces appear bright in radar images, which can be used to determine the differences between ʻaʻa and pāhoehoe lavas. These variations can also reflect differences in lava age and preservation. Channels and lava tubes (channels that have cooled down and over which a dome has formed) are very common on Venus. Two planetary astronomers from the University of Wollongong in Australia, Dr Graeme Melville and Prof. Bill Zealey, researched these lava tubes, using data supplied by NASA, over a number of years and concluded that they were widespread and up to ten times the size of those on the Earth. Melville and Zealey said that the gigantic size of the Venusian lava tubes (tens of meters wide and hundreds of kilometers long) may be explained by the very fluid lava flows together with the high temperatures on Venus, allowing the lava to cool slowly.

For the most part, lava flow fields are associated with volcanoes. The central volcanoes are surrounded by extensive flows that form the core of the volcano. They are also related to fissure craters, coronae, dense clusters of volcanic domes, cones, wells and channels.

Thanks to Magellan, more than 200 channels and valley complexes have been identified. The channels were classified as simple, complex, or compound. Simple channels are characterized by a single, long main channel. This category includes rills similar to those found on the Moon, and a new type, called canali, consisting of long, distinct channels which maintain their width throughout their entire course. The longest such channel identified (Baltis Vallis) has a length of more than 6,800 kilometres (4,200 mi), about one-sixth of the circumference of the planet.

Complex channels include anastomosed networks, in addition to distribution networks. This type of channel has been observed in association with several impact craters and important lava floods related to major lava flow fields. Compound channels are made of both simple and complex segments. The largest of these channels shows an anastomosed web and modified hills similar to those present on Mars.

Although the shape of these channels is highly suggestive of fluid erosion, there is no evidence that they were formed by water. In fact, there is no evidence of water anywhere on Venus in the last 600 million years. While the most popular theory for the channels' formation is that they are the result of thermal erosion by lava, there are other hypotheses, including that they were formed by heated fluids formed and ejected during impacts.

== Surface processes ==
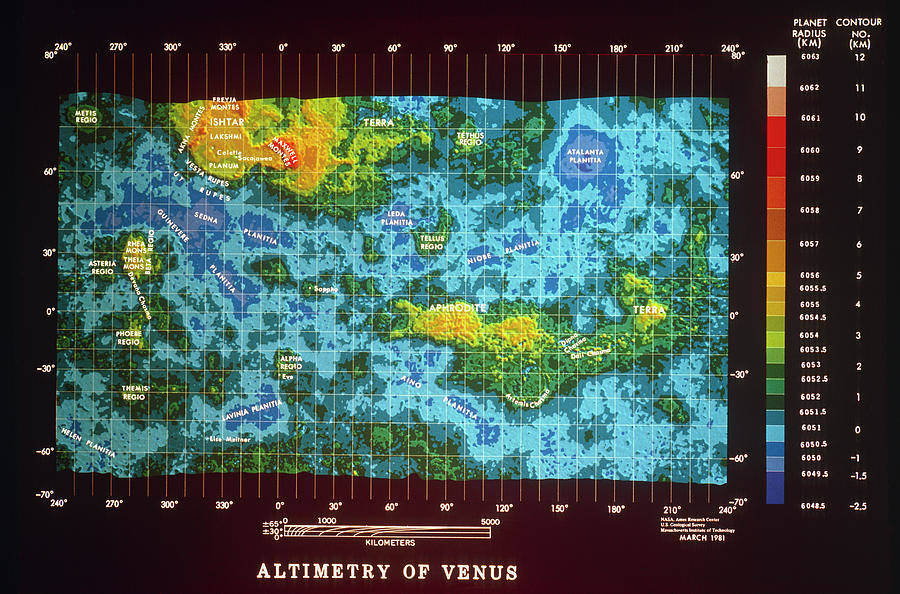
A map of Venus compiled from data recorded by NASA's Pioneer Venus Orbiter spacecraft beginning in 1978

=== Wind ===
Liquid water and ice are nonexistent on Venus, and thus the only agent of physical erosion to be found (apart from thermal erosion by lava flows) is wind. Wind tunnel experiments have shown that the density of the atmosphere allows the transport of sediments with even a small breeze. Therefore, the seeming rarity of eolian land forms must have some other cause. This implies that transportable sand-size particles are relatively scarce on the planet; which would be a result of very slow rates of mechanical erosion. The process that is most important for the production of sediment on Venus may be crater-forming impact events, which is bolstered by the seeming association between impact craters and downwind eolian land forms.

This process is manifest in the ejecta of impact craters expelled onto the surface of Venus. The material ejected during a meteorite impact is lifted to the atmosphere, where winds transport the material toward the west. As the material is deposited on the surface, it forms parabola-shaped patterns. This type of deposit can be established on top of various geologic features or lava flows. Therefore, these deposits are the youngest structures on the planet. Images from Magellan reveal the existence of more than 60 of these parabola-shaped deposits that are associated with crater impacts.

The ejection material, transported by the wind, is responsible for the process of renovation of the surface at speeds, according to the measurements of the Venera soundings, of approximately one metre per second. Given the density of the lower Venusian atmosphere, the winds are more than sufficient to provoke the erosion of the surface and the transportation of fine-grained material. In the regions covered by ejection deposits one may find wind lines, dunes, and yardangs. The wind lines are formed when the wind blows ejection material and volcanic ash, depositing it on top of topographic obstacles such as domes. As a consequence, the leeward sides of domes are exposed to the impact of small grains that remove the surface cap. Such processes expose the material beneath, which has a different roughness, and thus different characteristics under radar, compared to formed sediment.

The dunes are formed by the depositing of particulates that are the size of grains of sand and have wavy shapes. Yardangs are formed when the wind-transported material carves the fragile deposits and produces deep furrows.

The line-shaped patterns of wind associated with impact craters follow a trajectory in the direction of the equator. This tendency suggests the presence of a system of circulation of Hadley cells between medium latitudes and the equator. Magellan radar data confirm the existence of strong winds that blow toward the east in the upper surface of Venus, and meridional winds on the surface.

=== Chemical erosion ===
Chemical and mechanical erosion of the old lava flows is caused by reactions of the surface with the atmosphere in the presence of carbon dioxide and sulfur dioxide (see carbonate–silicate cycle for details). These two gases are the planet's first and third most abundant gases, respectively; the second most abundant gas is inert nitrogen. The reactions probably include the deterioration of silicates by carbon dioxide to produce carbonates and quartz, as well as the deterioration of silicates by sulfur dioxide to produce anhydrate calcium sulfate and quartz.

== Ancient liquid water ==
NASA's Goddard Institute for Space Studies and others have postulated that Venus may have had a shallow ocean in the past for up to 2 billion years, with as much water as Earth. Depending on the parameters used in their theoretical model, the last liquid water could have evaporated as recently as 715 million years ago. However, recent studies of Venus's atmosphere and interior suggest that Venusian surface water evaporated prior to 3 billion years ago or never existed. Currently, the only known water on Venus is in the form of a tiny amount of atmospheric vapor (20 ppm). Hydrogen, a component of water, is still being lost to space today as detected by ESA's Venus Express spacecraft.

== See also ==
- Geodynamics of Venus
- Venus snow
- Magellan
- Venera program
- Vega program
- Pioneer Venus Orbiter
- Venus Express
- List of craters on Venus
- List of extraterrestrial dune fields
- List of mountains on Venus
- List of geological features on Venus
