= Way 2 Real =

American rap group

Way 2 Real is a rap group who were signed to Solo Jam records in the 1990s. Their debut album 38th Street was released in 1995, their only charting single "Tha Butterfly" peaked at number fifteen on the US Rap chart. The lyrics describe the butterfly dance.

== Discography ==
=== Albums ===
Album information
38th Street
- Released: 1995
- Chart Peak: n/a
- Last RIAA Description: n/a
- Singles: "Tha Butterfly"
- Worldwide sales: n/a

=== Singles ===
Year	Title	Album	US	US Rap
1994	"Tha Butterfly"	38th Street	76	15
