= Irnini Mons =

Mountain on Venus

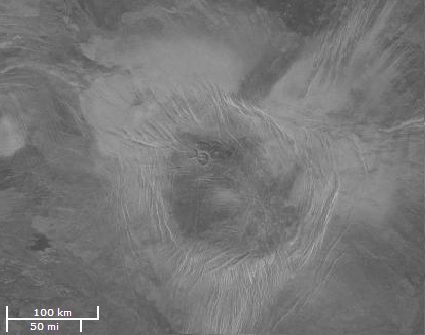
- Magellan image of Irnini Mons
- Feature type: Shield Volcano
- Coordinates: 14°N 16°E
- Diameter: 475 km
- Eponym: Irnina

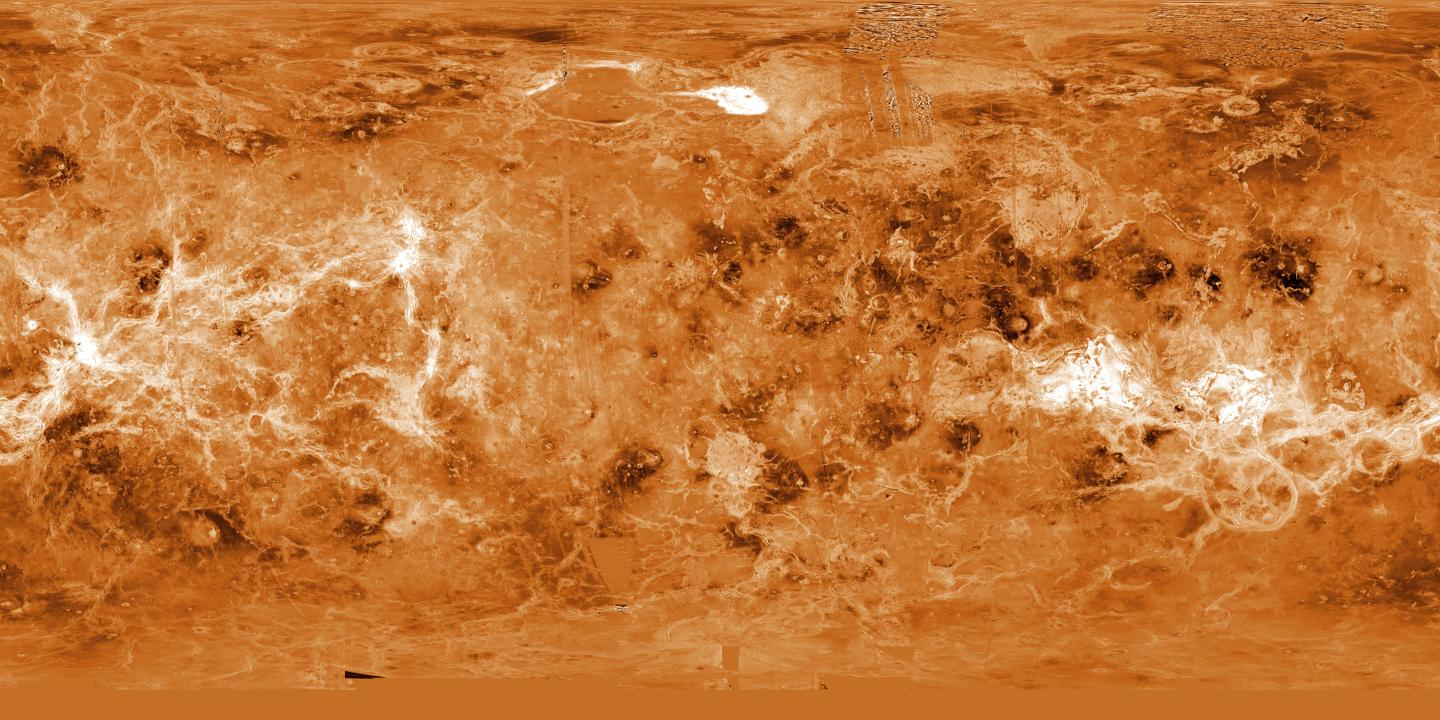
Irnini Mons location on Venusian surface.

Irnini Mons is a volcanic structure on the planet Venus, and is named after the Assyro-Babylonian goddess of cedar-tree mountains. It has a diameter of 475 km (295 mi), a height of 1.75 km (1.09 mi), and is located in Venus' northern hemisphere. More specifically, it is located in the central Eistla Regio region at (14°0′N 16°0′E) in the V-20 quadrangle. Sappho Patera, a 225 km (140 mi) diameter wide, caldera-like, depression tops the summit of Irnini Mons. The primary structural features surrounding Irnini Mons are graben, seen as linear depressed sections of rock, radiating from the central magma chamber. Also, concentric, circular ridges and graben outline the Sappho Patera depression at the summit. The volcano is crossed by various rift zones, including the north–south trending Badb Linea rift, the Guor Linea rift extending to the northwest, and the Virtus Linea rift continuing to the southeast.

The combination of volcanic-tectonic structures around Irnini Mons supports varying intensities of deformation and a multi-directional stress history. Although classified as a shield volcano, Irnini Mons contains many elements of the Venusian coronae, bringing speculation to its formation. If Irnini Mons was originally a corona, a shallow oval-shaped depression, it would support a thin lithosphere on Venus. On the other hand, it being a shield volcano supports the theory of a thicker lithosphere and Irnini Mons' stress history could be summarized simply as a transition from predominantly compressive forces to extensional relaxation, resulting in the observed radiating graben and concentric ridges.

Irnini Mons is a significant structural feature on Venus because the preservation of the geology allows for the analysis of Venus' regional stress orientation in response to a pressurized magma chamber over time.

== Geology of Irnini Mons ==
The geology of Irnini Mons and the surrounding region was interpreted using synthetic aperture radar data from the Magellan space mission. Stratigraphic units were identified using their relative brightness and texture. Topography and structural features, such as cross-cutting relationships, were also taken into account. The extremely low erosional rates on Venus contribute to the preservation of many of these volcanic-tectonic features. The high pressure inhibits wind erosion, the dryness prevents water erosion, and the lack of volatiles in magma results in structures that are mostly untouched.

=== Volcanic-tectonic structures ===
Diagram illustrating the stress transition (1 to 2) from regional compression to radial compression around Irnini Mons, resulting in radial graben

Irnini Mons is composed of continuous flows of basaltic lava, with younger pyroclastic material within the flows near the summit. The younger flows resurface and superimpose the older flows as seen by the intensity of observable wrinkle ridge deformation decreasing from older to younger flows. Irini Mons is characterized by various fracture, ridge, and graben complexes. This includes north–south trending rift and ridge structures that are parallel to the Badb Linea rift zone. Furthermore, many graben radiate from the central magma chamber resulting in a symmetrical web of structures. The radial graben are highly reflective in radar imaging and, therefore, easily noticeable. This radial network is a result of regional stresses that are altered closer to the magma-pressurized summit of Irnini Mons. The pressure from the magma chamber results in radiating graben because the regional linear compression is altered to radial compression in proximity to its "pressurized hole".

Circumferential ridges and graben are also highly reflective to radar, and therefore, easily observed around the Sappho Patera depression. These concentric features formed after Irnini Mons lost the high pressure dynamic support from the mantle upwelling due to the lack of overlying flows. The presence of circumferential structures along a shallow depression on Irnini Mons' summit is a characteristic of coronae on Venus. The presence of corona-like features suggest two possible theories for interpretation of how Irnini Mons developed. One hypothesis is a transition from a primarily shield volcano structure to a primarily corona structure due to continued lithosphere thinning and lack of resurfacing flows. Another hypothesis is Irnini Mons was originally a corona which was uplifted due to compressive forces.

=== Regional geology ===
The low viscosity basaltic flows that compose Irnini Mons overlay several regional plains and tessera units of Eistla Regio. The oldest observed rocks are a highly deformed tessera unit with ridges and grabens at high angles between one another which create the tessera-textured pattern for which it is named. The plains units are generally less deformed, but show a dominant linear trend of wrinkle ridges going in an east–west direction from the prevalent north–south compression. The tessera structures are truncated by the east–west wrinkle ridges, indicating the tessera formed before the wrinkle ridges. The youngest plains material is significantly less deformed than the older plains material and underlies the Irnini flows. All impact craters observed occurred prior to formation of the east–west wrinkle ridges.

The largest regional structure is the Guor Linea rift extending to the northwest, with its counterpart, the Virtus Linea rift, trending back in a southeast direction. Both of these rift zones cut through the plains units but not through Irnini Mons, indicating the Irnini flows postdate these rifts. Badb Linea is the third rift zone and consists of closely spaced, linear grabens trending in a north–south direction. However, unlike the other rifts, Badb Linea has structures which both truncate and cross-cut the Irnini flows, signifying that its rifting occurred before and after the Irnini flows.

The abundance of tectonic structures (e.g. wrinkle ridges, graben, and tessera) in proximity to Irnini Mons provides indications for the regional stress orientation of the shallow crust, as well as local timelines. The dominant change from east–west trending regional wrinkle ridges to radial ridges around Irnini Mons signifies a transition from north–south compression to radial compression near the summit.

== Formation theories ==
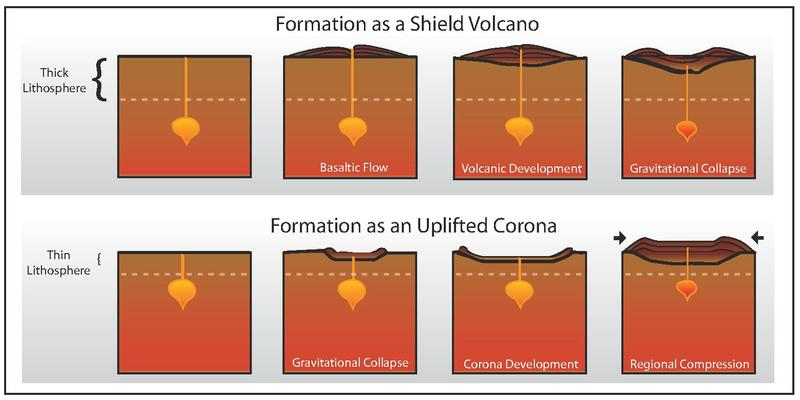

=== Shield volcano ===
The most widely accepted belief is that Irnini Mons formed as a shield volcano, and experienced a crater collapse later in its geologic life. Shield volcanoes on Venus develop as a result of mantle upwelling occurring under thick lithosphere in a constant location over a relatively long period of time. Effusive flows from the magma chamber emitted low viscosity, basaltic lava which resurfaced the regional tessera plains of Venus. The placid flows eventually formed a shallow sloping volcano with its summit above the magma pressurized center. Radiating fractures and ridges due to compression formed simultaneously with the continuous lava flows.

The central depression, Sappho Patera, formed due to a loss of dynamic support from the central magma chamber upwelling. The loss of mantle support resulted in a gravitational collapse of the summit and a relaxation of the compressive stresses directed towards the summit. The result is a pattern of concentric ridges and fractures around a semi-circular, caldera-like depression on the summit of Irnini Mons. In addition, Irnini Mons then ceased to emit steady flows and went into a stable isostatic balance with low density lithospheric support. The lack of steady, resurfacing flows allowed the preservation of volcanic-tectonic features that had developed over the life-span of the volcano. The transition from volcanic build-up to summit collapse is directly related to the degree of melting from the central magma chamber.

=== Uplifted corona ===
An alternate theory is, rather than being a shield volcano, Irnini Mons developed as a corona under thin lithosphere, and was simply tectonically uplifted to its present elevation under the north–south compression. Coronae develop when a mantle upwelling bends the crust upwards, which later collapses when the dynamic support from the upwelling is lost, resulting in a shallow oval-shaped depression. This hypothesis requires two assumptions:

- The formation of Irnini Mons as a corona occurred simultaneously with uplift.
- The Irnini flows predate the radial and circumferential structures seen on Irnini Mons' summit.

If the corona uplift theory is correct, then most of the topographic highs in the Eistla Regio region of Venus would also be due to uplift. Additionally, it supports the hypothesis of a thin lithosphere on Venus. The theory of corona uplift much more unlikely than Irnini Mons simply being a shield volcano which underwent natural volcanic progression.

== Timeline of events ==
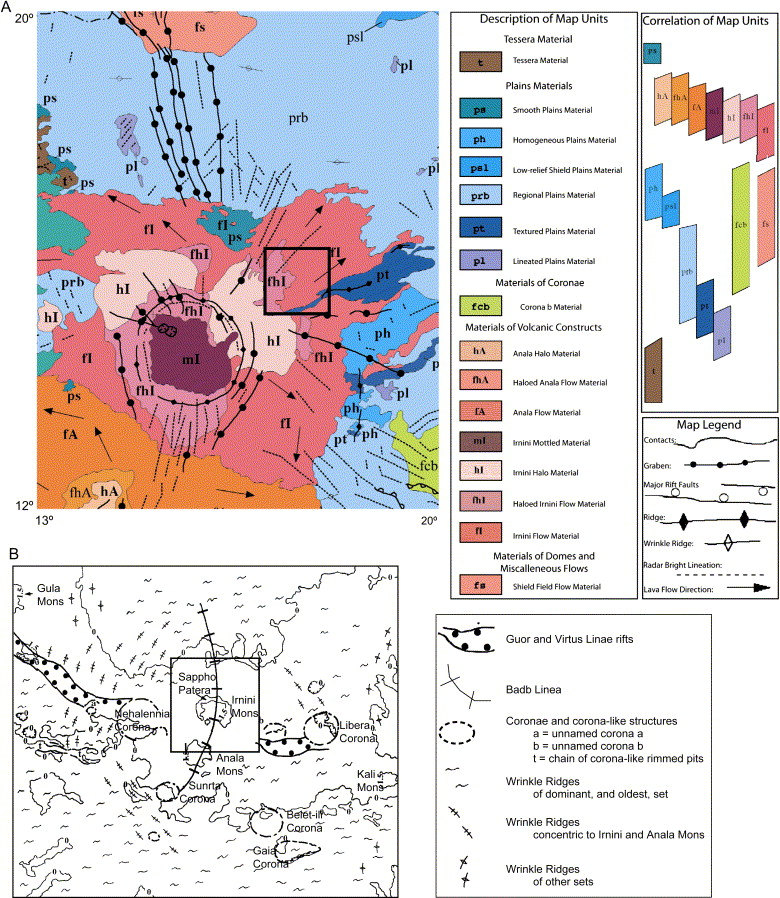
Detailed geologic map by the United States Geological Survey of the V-20 quadrangle on Venus. Irnini Mons and Sappo Patera are located in the center of this quadrangle.

An approximate timeline of the regional geologic events, occurring over a time period of a few hundred million years, can be summarized as:

1. East-west wrinkle ridge formation on the regional plains due to north–south compression.
2. Formation of radial graben due to magma pressure and radial ridges due to magma pressure and regional compression around Irnini Mons.
3. Badb Linea rifting and decline of regional compression forms graben at further distances from Irnini Mons.
4. Lessening of magma pressure and formation of concentric graben near summit.
5. Formation of concentric ridges near summit due to gravitational relaxation.

== See also ==
- Venus
- Volcanism on Venus
- Geology of Venus
- List of montes on Venus
- Shield Volcano
- Venusian Coronae
