= Skadi Mons =

Misidentified feature on Venus

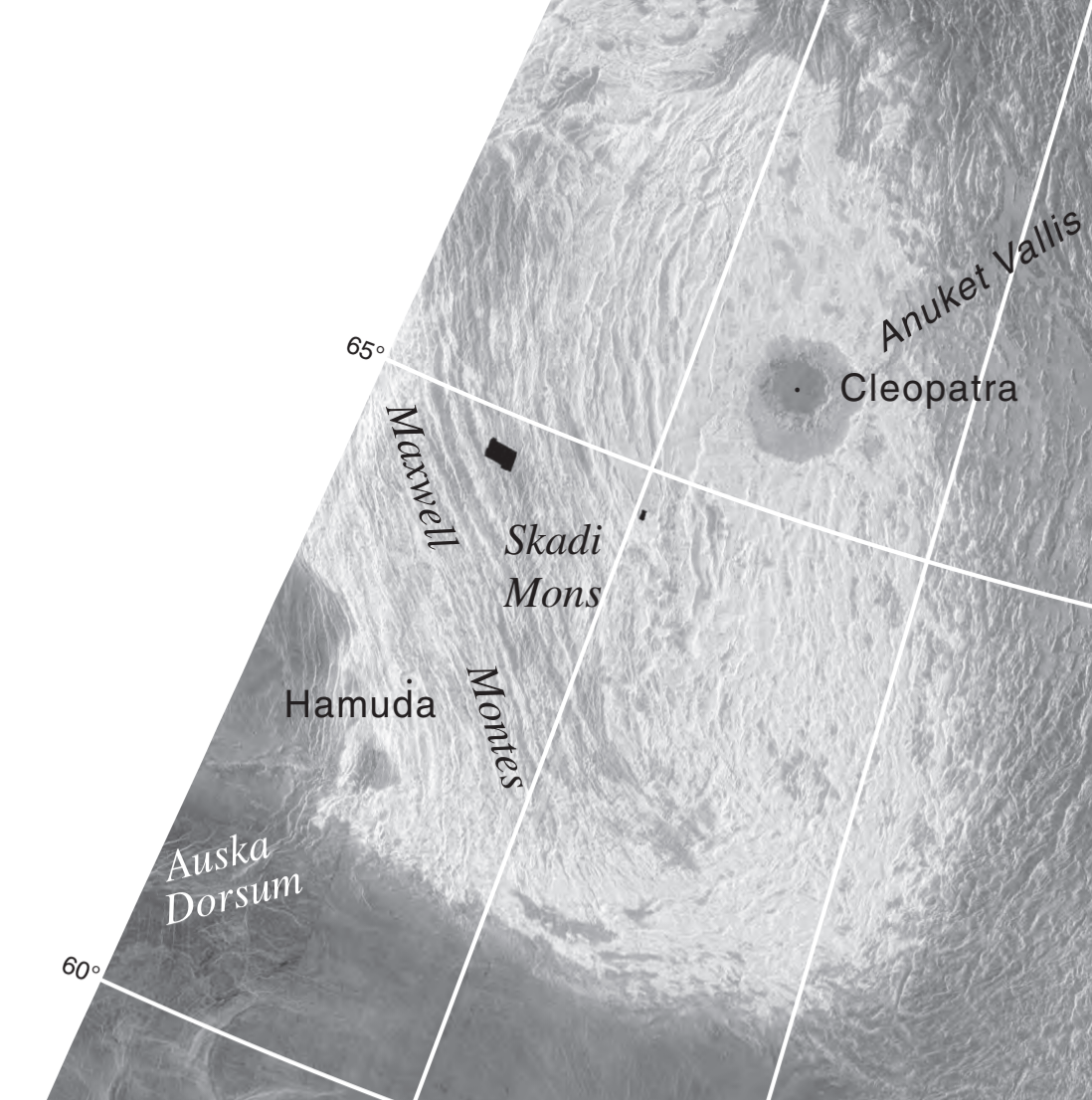
- Map of Maxwell Montes with Skadi Mons labeled
- Feature type: Mountain (disproven)
- Location: Central Ishtar Terra, Venus
- Coordinates: 64°N 4°E
- Eponym: Skadi

Skadi Mons /ˈskɑːði ˈmɒnz/ was a misidentified geologic feature on Venus. For 31 years it was thought to be Venus's tallest mountain, located in Maxwell Montes at the center of Ishtar Terra, but further analysis of Venus's topography in 2025 showed that there was no mountain. The name Skadi Mons was approved by the International Astronomical Union in 1994, but was officially dropped and disallowed on 17 December 2025.

When Skadi Mons was assumed to be the highest point on Venus's surface, it was thought to have altitude of around 10,700 meters (about 35,000 feet) above the mean planetary radius. This apparently high altitude led scientists to initially believe that Skadi Mons could have a cooler temperature (about 380 °C or 716 °F) and lower atmospheric pressure (about 45 bar or 44 atm).

The name came from Skaði, the norse goddess of skiing (Öndurdís). The word means "damage" or "shadow", being related to the name Scandinavia and maybe the underworld.

== See also ==
- Maat Mons, the tallest individual mountain on Venus
- List of montes on Venus
