= Dzelarhons =

Dzelarhons, or Dzalarhons (English: Volcano Woman) is a mountain spirit in the mythology of the Haida people. She rules the earth's creatures and punishes anyone who abuses them.

According to legend, Dzelarhons was originally a mortal woman whose husband became abusive soon after the wedding. Outraged, her people came to rescue her and burned down the village. Dzelarhons was nowhere to be found; in her place was a stone statue holding a burning staff. She was now a powerful goddess and guardian of animals.

One story describes Dzelarhons' vengeance. There were villagers who had such an abundance of fish in their waters that they began to torture and kill them for amusement. In response, Dzelarhons rumbled and erupted, killing them with her fiery rage.

The Dzalarhons Mons, a mountain on Venus, is named after her.
