= Ozza Mons =

Venusian shield volcano

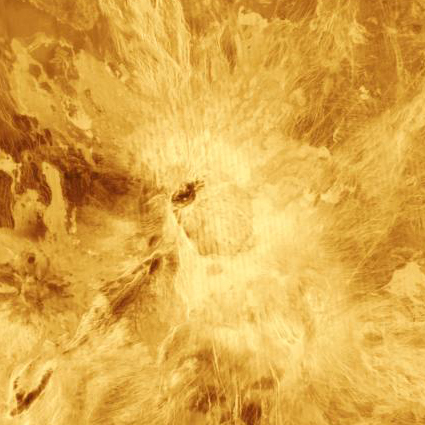
- Feature type: Volcano
- Coordinates: 4.5°N 201°E
- Diameter: 507 km

Ozza Mons is an inactive shield volcano on planet Venus near the equator.

Four temporally variable surface hotspots were discovered at the Ganiki Chasma rift zone near volcanoes Ozza Mons and Maat Mons in 2015, suggesting present volcanic activity. However, correctly interpreting these types of observations from above the cloud layer is a challenge.

== See also ==
- Geology of Venus
- Volcanism on Venus
