= Wanda (crater) =

Crater on Venus

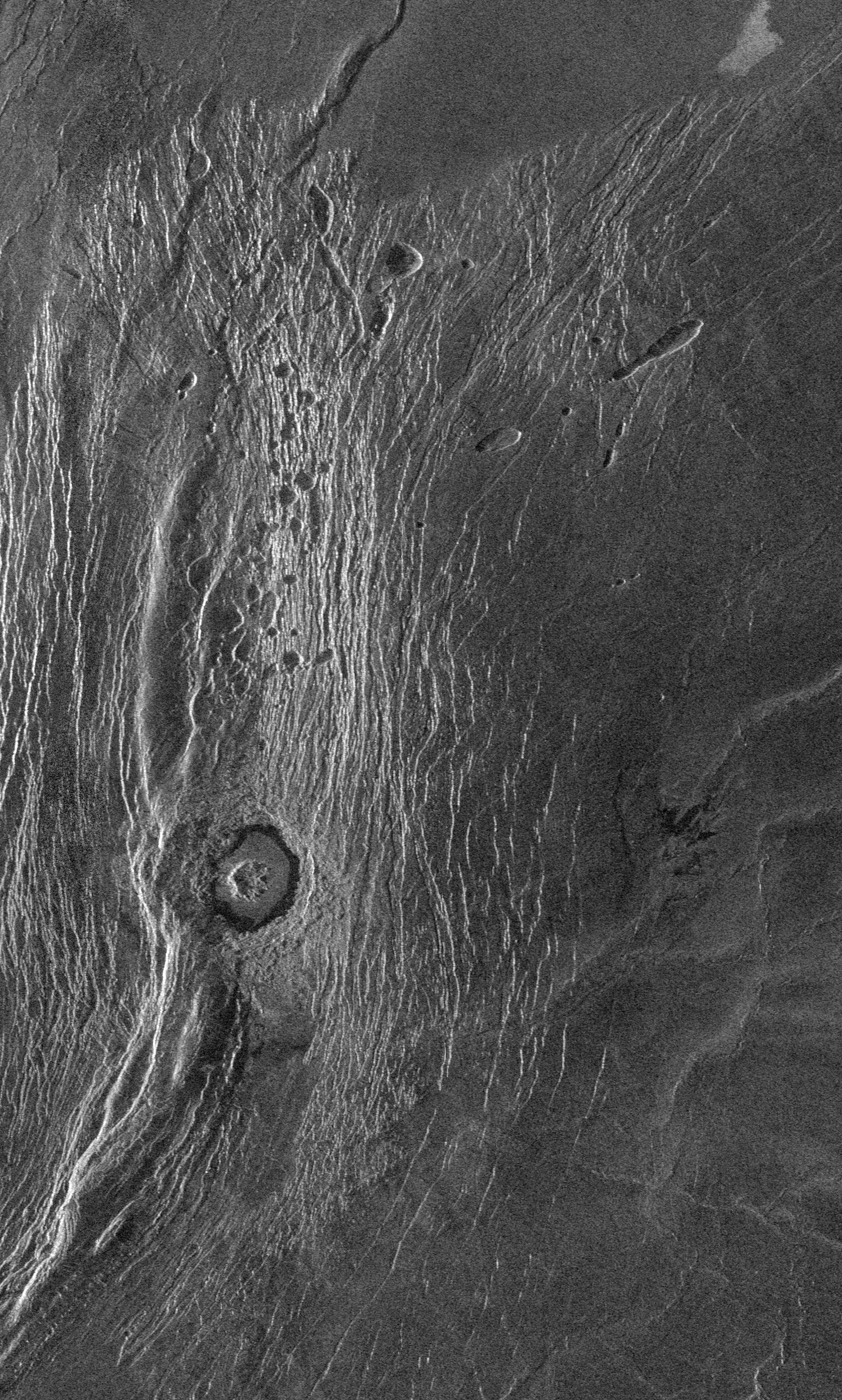
- Magellan radar image
- Location: Venus
- Coordinates: 71.3°N 323.1°E
- Diameter: 21.7
- Eponym: Polish first name

Wanda is a crater in the Akna Montes on Venus, first mapped by the Soviet Venera 15/16 mission in 1984. It was formed by the impact of an asteroid.

== Geological description ==
The crater has a rugged central peak and a smooth radar-dark floor, likely volcanic material. The crater does not appear to be much deformed by later crustal movement that uplifted the mountains and crumpled the plains. Material from the adjacent mountain ridge to the west, however, appears to have collapsed into the crater. Small pits seen to the north of the crater may be volcanic collapse pits a few kilometers across (1–2 miles).
