= Sedna Planitia =

Planitia on Venus

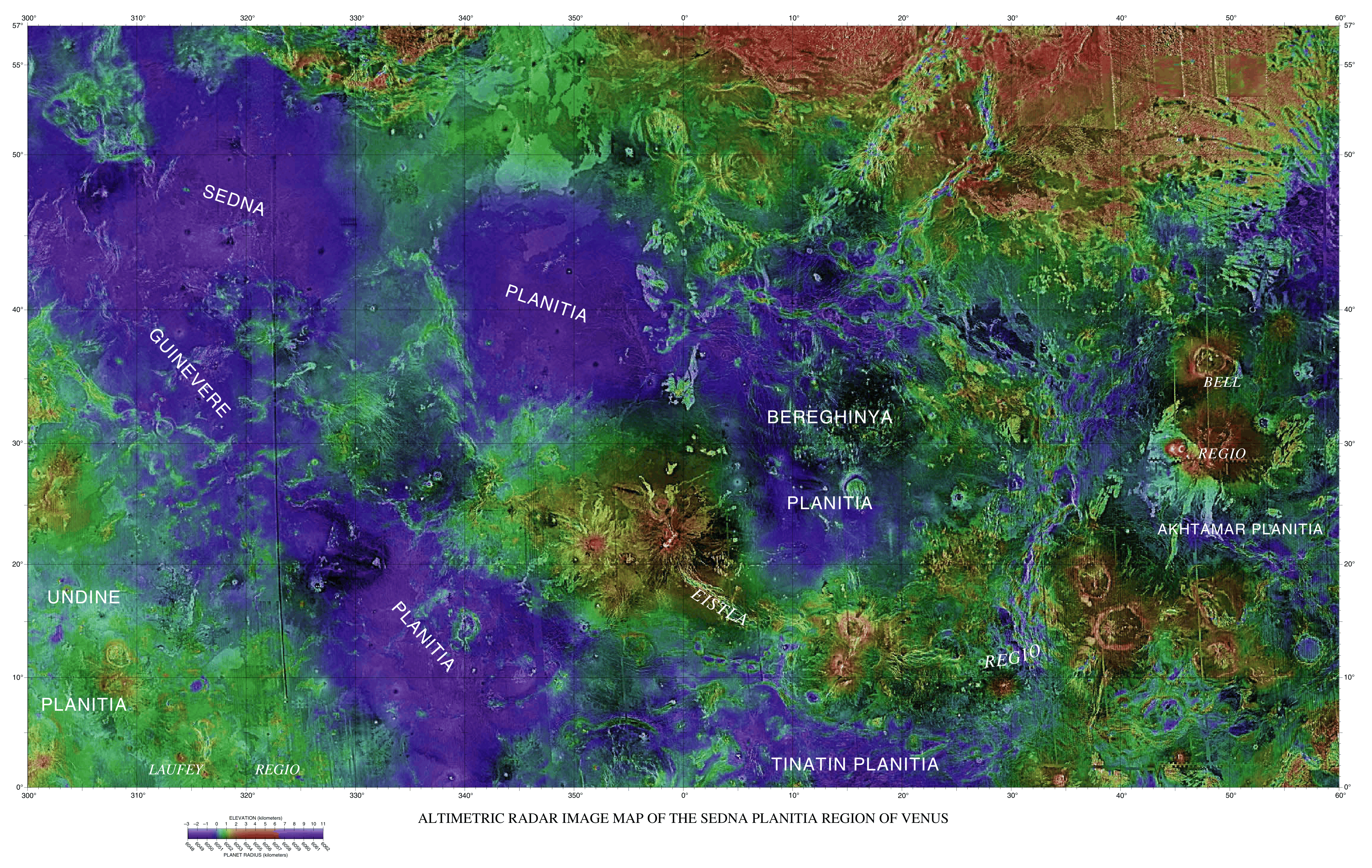
- Altimetric radar image map of the Sedna Planitia region of Venus
- Feature type: Planitia
- Coordinates: 42.7°N 340.7°E
- Diameter: 3,570 km
- Eponym: Sedna

Sedna Planitia is a large lowland area of Venus, south of Ishtar Terra. It is thought to be lava-covered and similar to a lunar mare. Its name is derived from the Inuit sea goddess.
