= Anala Mons =

Volcano on Venus

- Feature type: Volcano
- Coordinates: 11.0°N 14.1°E
- Eponym: Anala

Anala Mons is a volcano on Venus. It is named after Anala, a Hindu fertility goddess. The feature was originally named Anala Corona. It is located at 11.0°N 14.1°E, in a region called the Sappho Patera quadrangle where numerous other volcanic features can be found.

== See also ==
- List of montes on Venus
- Volcanism on Venus
