= Waka (mythology) =

Hawaiian lizard goddess

- Lizard goddess
- Venerated in: Hawaiian religion
- Animals: Lizard; Eel
- Adherents: Female chiefs
- Gender: Female

Waka, in Hawaiian mythology, is a lizard goddess worshipped by female chiefs. In the Ha'inakolo narrative, she was sent in the form of an eel to bar Lono-kai from the land of Kū'ai-he-lani. When Lono-kai caught the eel and cut it open, a beautiful woman emerged who attempted to seduce him. In the Lā'ie-i-ka-wei narrative, Waka acts as the guardian of a beautiful girl until she can find her a suitable husband.

The Waka Mons, a mountain on Venus, is named for her.
