= Butterfly dance =

Type of dance

The butterfly dance is a dance move in which the dancer's legs repeatedly move or flutter like butterfly wings. It originated within the Jamaican music genre called Dancehall. This dance move has been featured in Dancehall music videos since the 1970s. It has since become popularized along with the popularization of Dancehall music culture.

== Wing Dance ==
The Wing Dance is a common element in dancing. Along with the related Buck and Jig dances of African and Irish origin, the Wing appears and apparently applies to other various dances {and even poses} that bend, spread, twist, space and so on; it can also apply to arm & hand works where you can shape or move them in the same order or other. Along with the Butterfly, some examples are the Charleston, freestyle Leg Wobble/Bopping, Horse Stance, Billy Bounce, Popping, Diversion, Stanky Legg, PSY Gangnam Style Dance, Plié, "Dangerous Moves" and some Shuffles. Sometimes, similar dance moves could be subliminal to the mating ritual. Similar shapes can be found in other forms of art and design.

== See also ==
- Clogging
- Clog dancing
- Hopi butterfly dance
- Jig
- Country–western dance
