= Maat Mons =

Tallest mountain and volcano on Venus

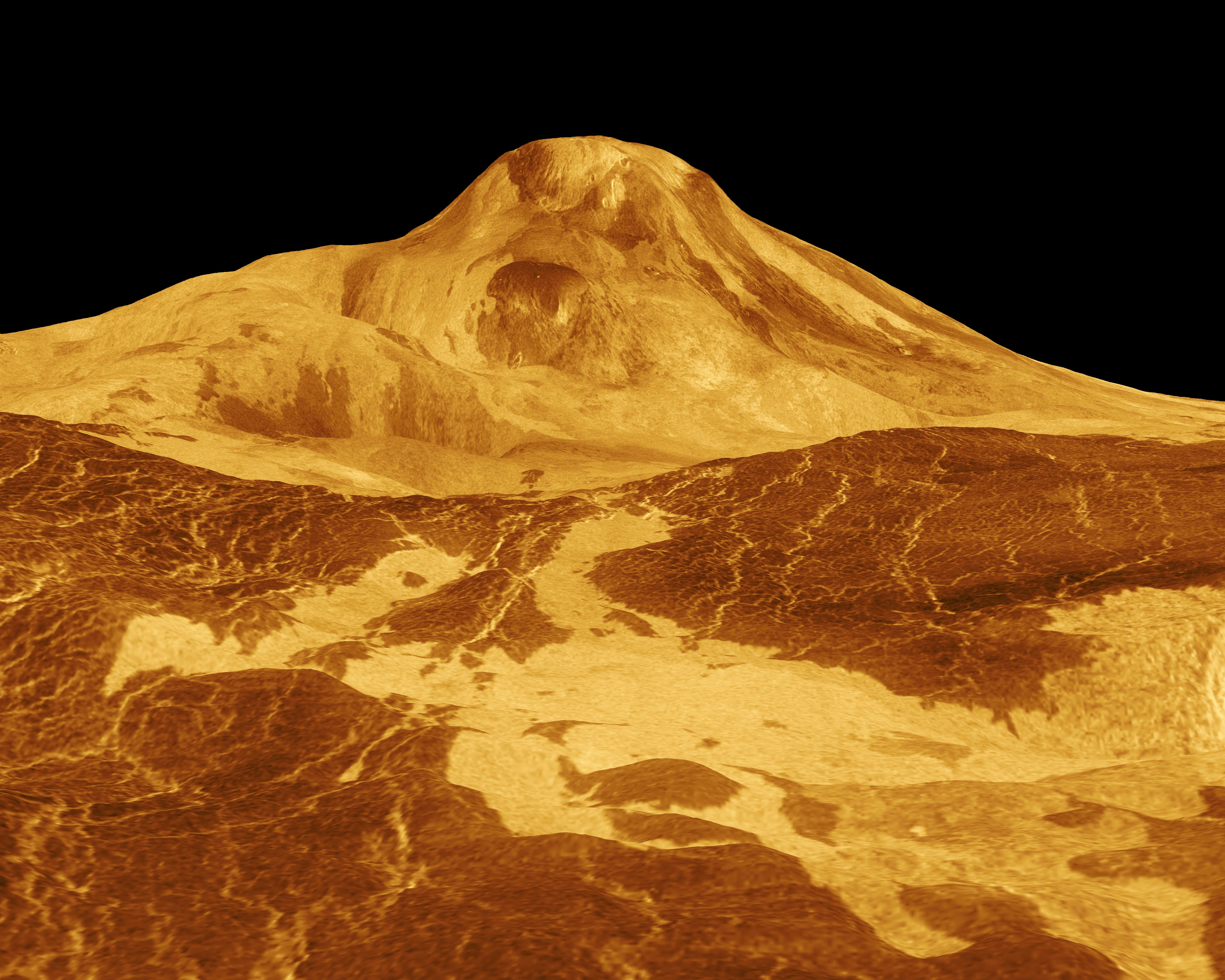
- Maat Mons in a 1991 false-color three-dimensional perspective view of the surface of Venus, with the vertical scale multiplied by 22.5. Based on Magellan probe radar images
- Feature type: Shield volcano
- Location: Atla Regio, Venus
- Coordinates: 0.5°N 194.6°E
- Diameter: 395 km (245 mi)
- Peak: 4.9 km (3.0 mi) 16,076 ft (4,900 m); 8 km (5.0 mi) 26,247 ft (8,000 m) above mean.
- Eponym: Ma'at

Maat Mons is a massive shield volcano on the planet Venus. It is the planet's tallest individual mountain and volcano. It rises 8 kilometres (5.0 mi) above Venus's mean planetary radius at 0.5°N 194.6°E, and nearly 5 km above the surrounding plains. It is named after the Egyptian goddess of truth and justice, Ma'at.

== Geology ==
Maat Mons is a large shield volcano located in Atla Regio, a site of recent tectonic rifting possibly fed by an active mantle plume. Three other neighbouring major volcanic centres are situated within Atla Regio, Ozza Mons, Ongwuti Mons, and an unnamed mons. Interpretation of their respective radial dike swarm features indicates that Maat Mons is the youngest volcanic centre within Atla Regio, fed by the same mantle plume which gave rise to the previous volcanic centres.

=== Structure ===
Maat Mons has a large summit caldera, 28×31 km in size. Within the large caldera, there are at least five smaller collapse craters, up to 10 km in diameter. A chain of small craters 3–5 km in diameter extends some 40 km along the southeast flank of the volcano, but rather than indicating a large fissure eruption, they seem to also be formed by collapse. Full-resolution imagery from the Magellan probe reveals no evidence of lava flows from these craters.

At least two large-scale structural collapse events seem to have occurred in the past on Maat Mons.

Maat Mons is surrounded by a radial dike swarm, with grabens extending over 1,500 kilometres from the volcano's centre.

=== Modern activity ===
Intriguingly for planetary geologists, atmospheric studies carried out by the Pioneer Venus probes in the early 1980s revealed a considerable variation in the concentrations of sulfur dioxide (SO_{2}) and methane (CH_{4}) in Venus's middle and upper atmosphere. One possible explanation for this was the injection of volcanic gases into the atmosphere by plinian eruptions at Maat Mons.

More recent studies have suggested that the volcano structure, distribution of lava flows, pit craters, summit morphology, and other small-scale features are indicative of recent volcanic activity on Maat Mons.

A study published by the journal Science in 2023 concluded that there has been recent volcanic activity on Maat Mons. The study analyzed images taken between 1990 and 1992 by the Magellan spacecraft. These images, taken eight months apart, displayed changes to the volcanic vent's shape and dramatically increased in size. The image also showed features that have been interpreted as lava flows.

== See also ==
- Skadi Mons, former "tallest mountain" of Venus that was disproven in 2025
- List of tallest mountains in the Solar System
- List of montes on Venus
- Volcanism on Venus
