= Ciuacoatl Mons =

Mountain on Venus

- Feature type: Mountain
- Coordinates: 53.0°N 150.9°E
- Diameter: 100 km
- Eponym: Cihuacoatl

Ciuacoatl Mons is a mountain on Venus. Its name is derived from the Aztec fertility goddess.
