= Ushas Mons =

Mons on Venus

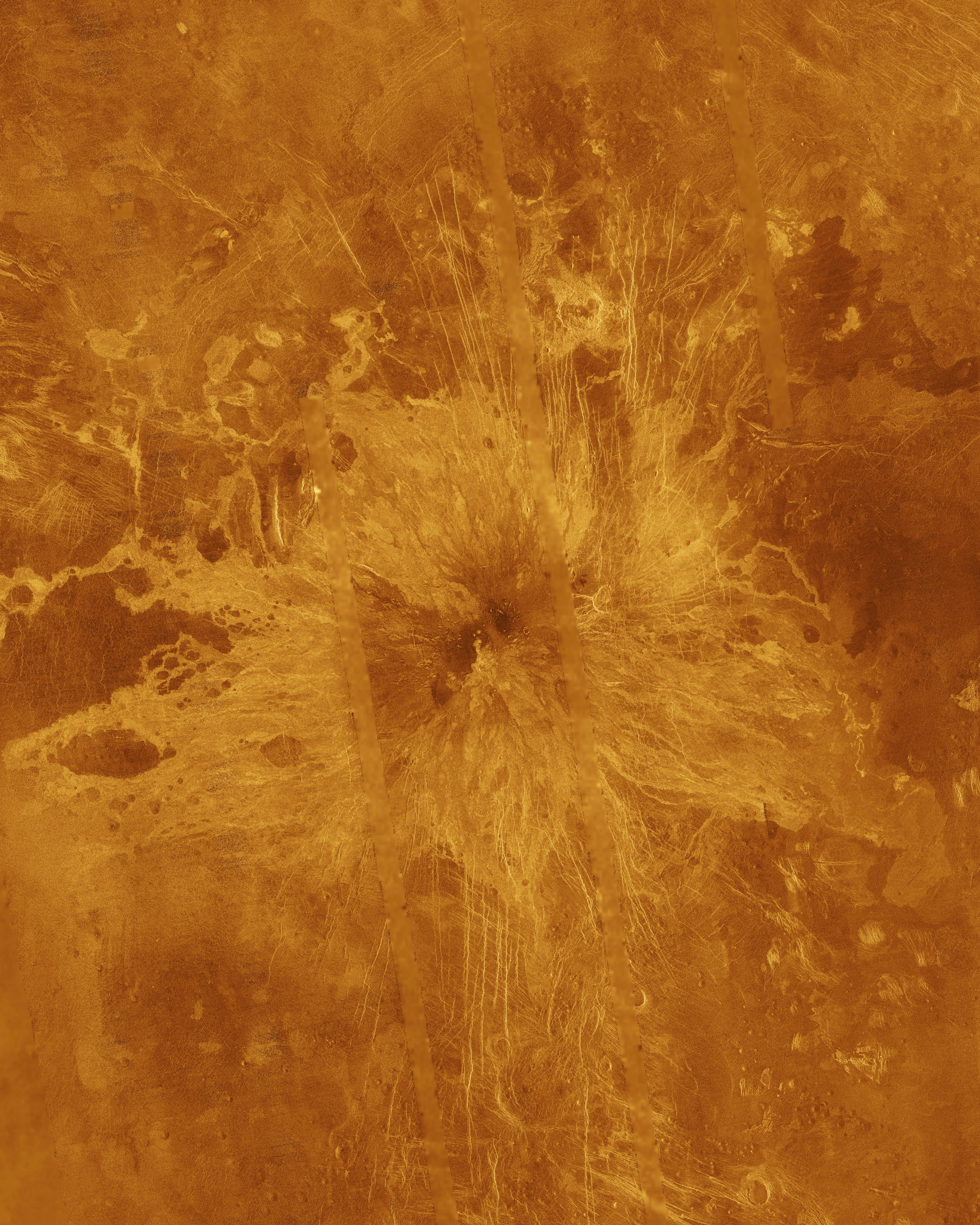
- Radar image of Ushas Mons
- Feature type: Mountain
- Coordinates: 24.3°S 324.6°E
- Diameter: 413 km
- Eponym: Ushas

Ushas Mons is a 2-kilometer-high (1.2-mile) volcano in the southern hemisphere of Venus at 25 degrees south latitude, 323 degrees east longitude. Its name is derived from Vedic goddess of dawn Ushas. The volcano is marked by numerous bright lava flows and a set of north–south trending fractures, many of which appear to have formed after the lavas were erupted onto the surface. In the central summit area, however, younger flows remain unfractured. An impact crater can be seen among the fractures in the upper center of the image. The association of faulting and volcanism is common on this type of volcano on Venus, and is believed to result from a large zone of hot material upwelling from the Venusian mantle, a phenomenon known on Earth as a "hotspot."
