= Lanig =

Lanig is a surname. Notable people with the surname include:

- Evi Lanig (born 1933), German alpine skier
- Hans-Peter Lanig (1935–2022), German alpine skier
- Marie-Sophie Lanig (born 1995), German politician
- Martin Lanig (born 1984), German football midfielder
