= Ishtar Terra =

Terra on Venus

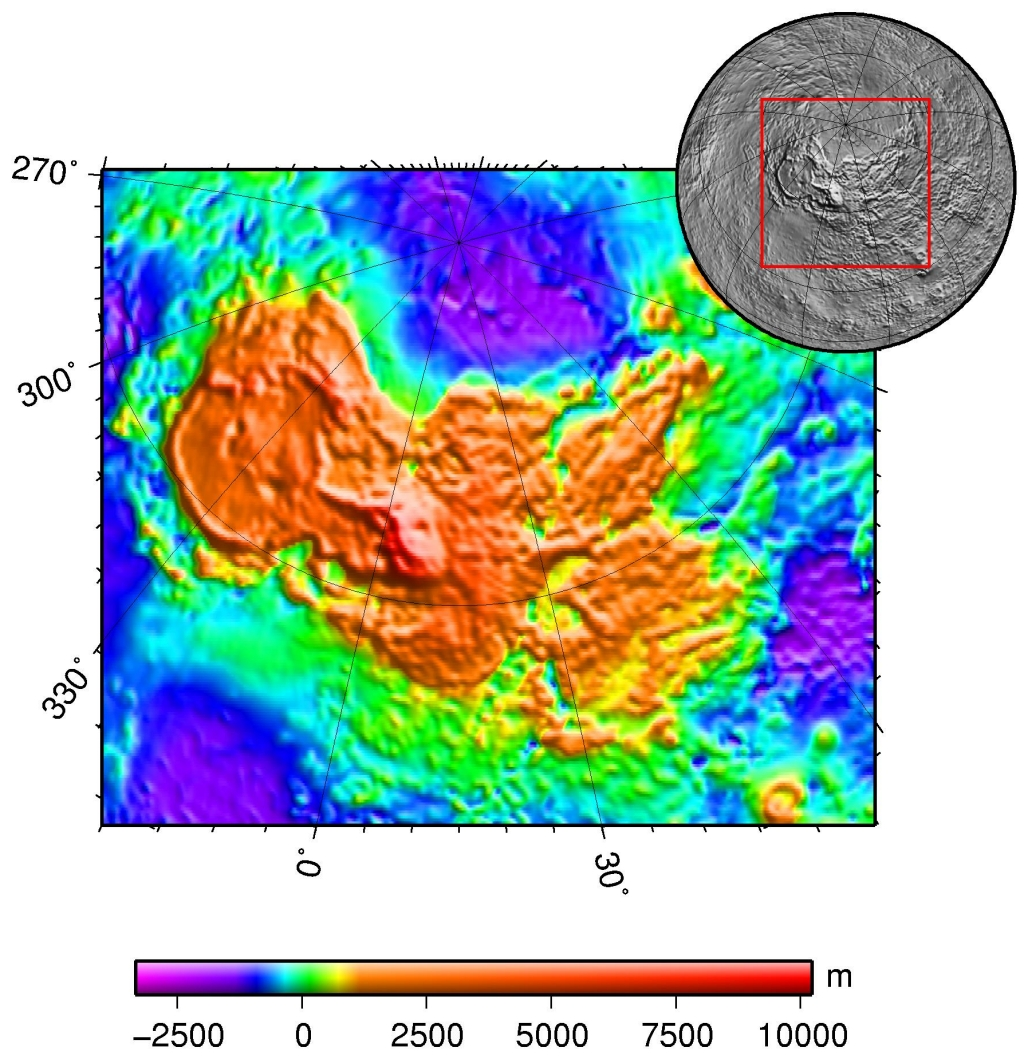
- Topography of Ishtar Terra
- Feature type: Terra
- Coordinates: 70.4°N 27.5°E
- Diameter: 5,610 km
- Eponym: Ishtar

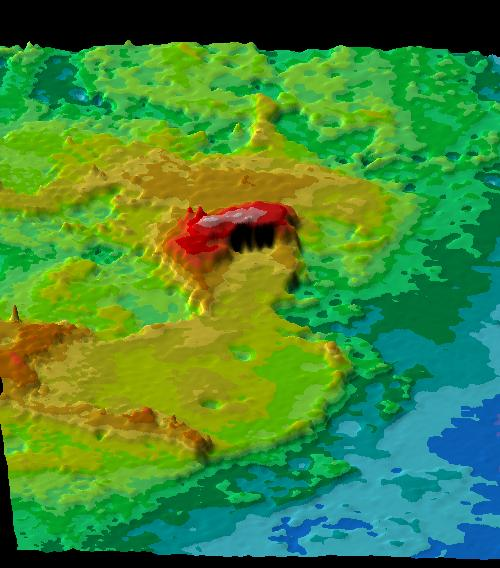
Perspective rendering of Ishtar Terra, at the center of the image is Maxwell Montes, according to its elevation in red and its peaks in white.

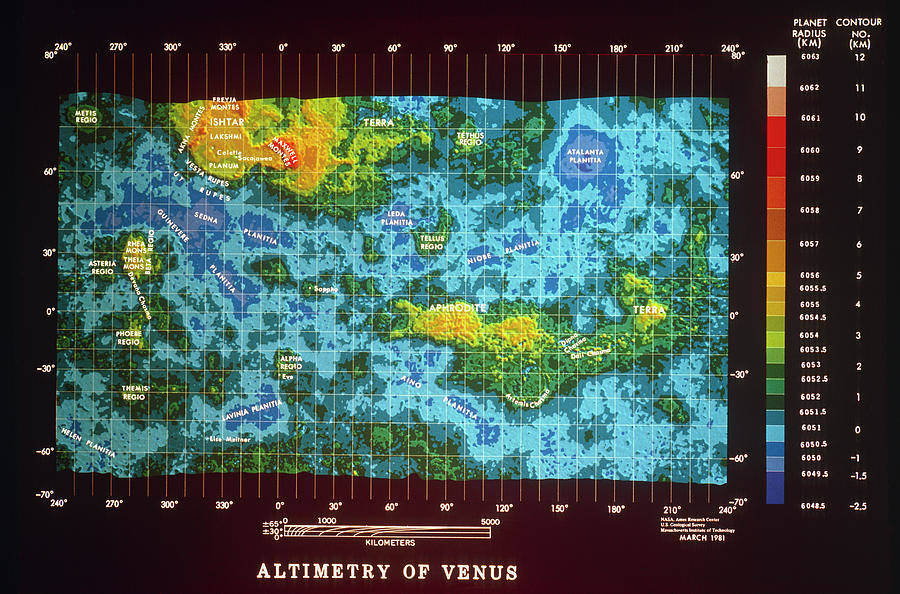
Color-coded elevation map, showing the elevated terrae "continents" in yellow: Ishtar Terra at the top.

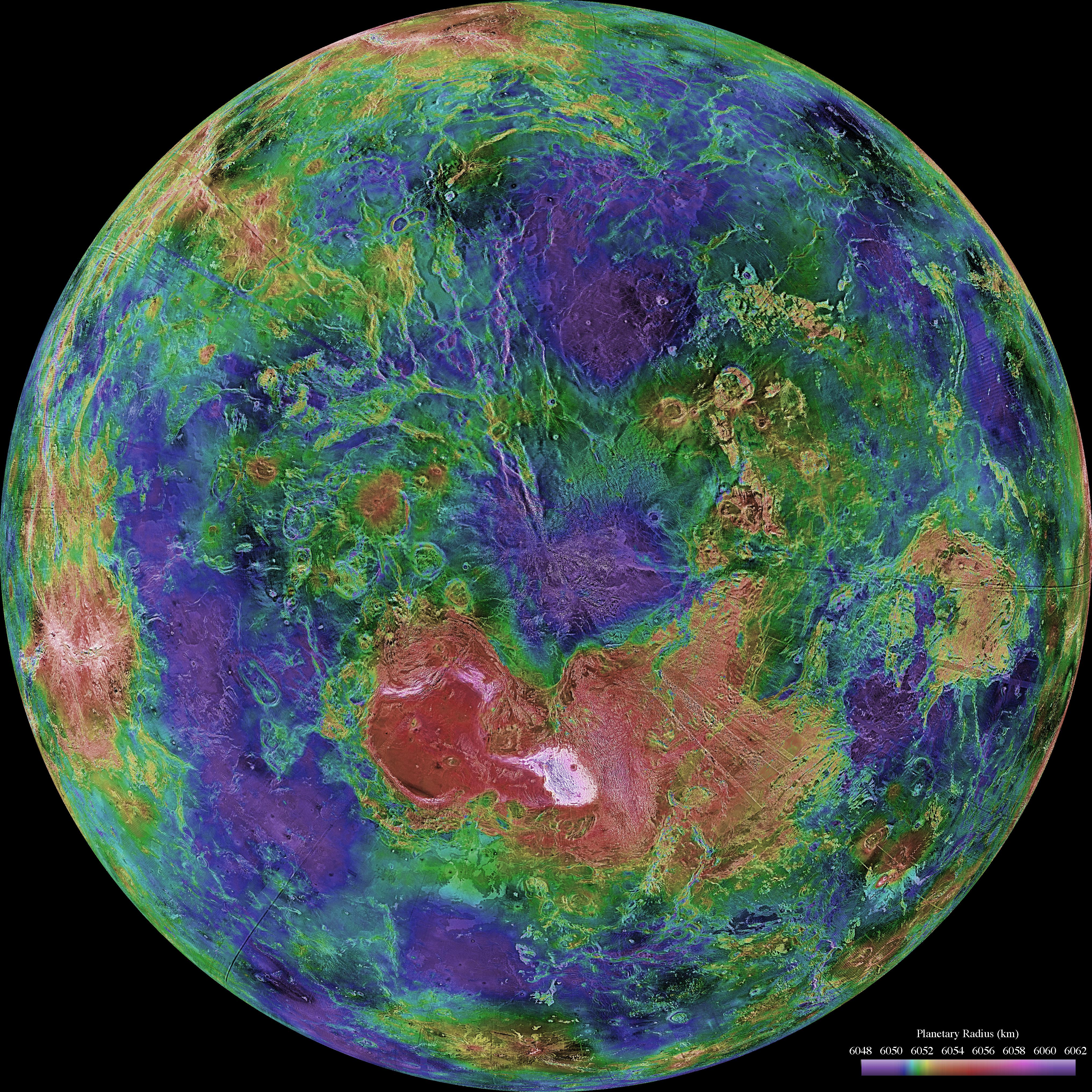
Topographic radar image view of Venus, with Ishtar Terra near center

Ishtar Terra /ˈɪʃtɑːr ˈtɛrə/ is the second largest of the three continental terrae regions on the planet Venus, the others being Aphrodite Terra and Lada Terra.

It is a highland region named after the Akkadian goddess Ishtar, and is found in the north of the planet. Note that Ishtar Terra is located near the negative pole if Venus's rotation is defined as prograde by the right-hand rule. The rotation of the planet is commonly characterized as retrograde in order to correlate its northern hemisphere with Earth's, in which case Ishtar Terra is near the north pole. This is the convention normally used for maps.

In size, it is roughly between Australia and the contiguous United States, making it the second-largest of the terrae. On its eastern edge lies the great mountain chain Maxwell Montes, which is about 11 kilometers (6.8 mi) high, compared to Mount Everest at 8.8 kilometers (5.5 mi). On one side of the mountain chain is the impact crater Cleopatra, 100 kilometers (62 mi) in diameter filled with lava.

Ishtar Terra contains the four main mountain ranges of Venus: Maxwell Montes on the eastern edge, Freyja Montes in the north, Akna Montes on the western edge, and Danu Montes in the southern region. These surround the lower plain of Ishtar Terra, which is named Lakshmi Planum (after the Hindu goddess Lakshmi).

Ishtar Terra also contains volcanoes named after famous women: Sacajawea and Colette. Ishtar Terra is also the site of many tesserae, made by tectonic deformation.

== In popular culture ==
The Ishtar Terra appears as an explorable location in the video game Destiny going by the name “Ishtar Sink”.

== See also ==
- Geography of Venus
- Aphrodite Terra
- Lada Terra
