= Latent internal energy =

The latent internal energy of a system is the internal energy a system requires to undergo a phase transition. Its value is specific to the substance or mix of substances in question. The value can also vary with temperature and pressure. Generally speaking the value is different for the type of phase change being accomplished. Examples can include Latent internal energy of vaporization (liquid to vapor), Latent internal energy of crystallization (liquid to solid) Latent internal energy of sublimation (solid to vapor). These values are usually expressed in units of energy per mole or per mass such as J/mol or BTU/lb. Often a negative sign will be used to represent energy being withdrawn from the system, while a positive value represents energy being added to the system.

For every type of latent internal energy there is an opposite. For example, the latent internal energy of Freezing (liquid to solid) is equal to the negative of the Latent internal energy of melting (solid to liquid)
