= Renpet Mons =

Venusian volcano

- Feature type: Mountain
- Coordinates: 76.0°N 237.4°E

Renpet Mons is a large shield volcano, located on the eastern portion of a ridge-belt province on Venus. It has a diameter of 300 km (190 mi) and is the source for massive lava flows overlying the Snegurochka Planitia plain.
