= Polik-mana =

Spirit in Hopi mythology

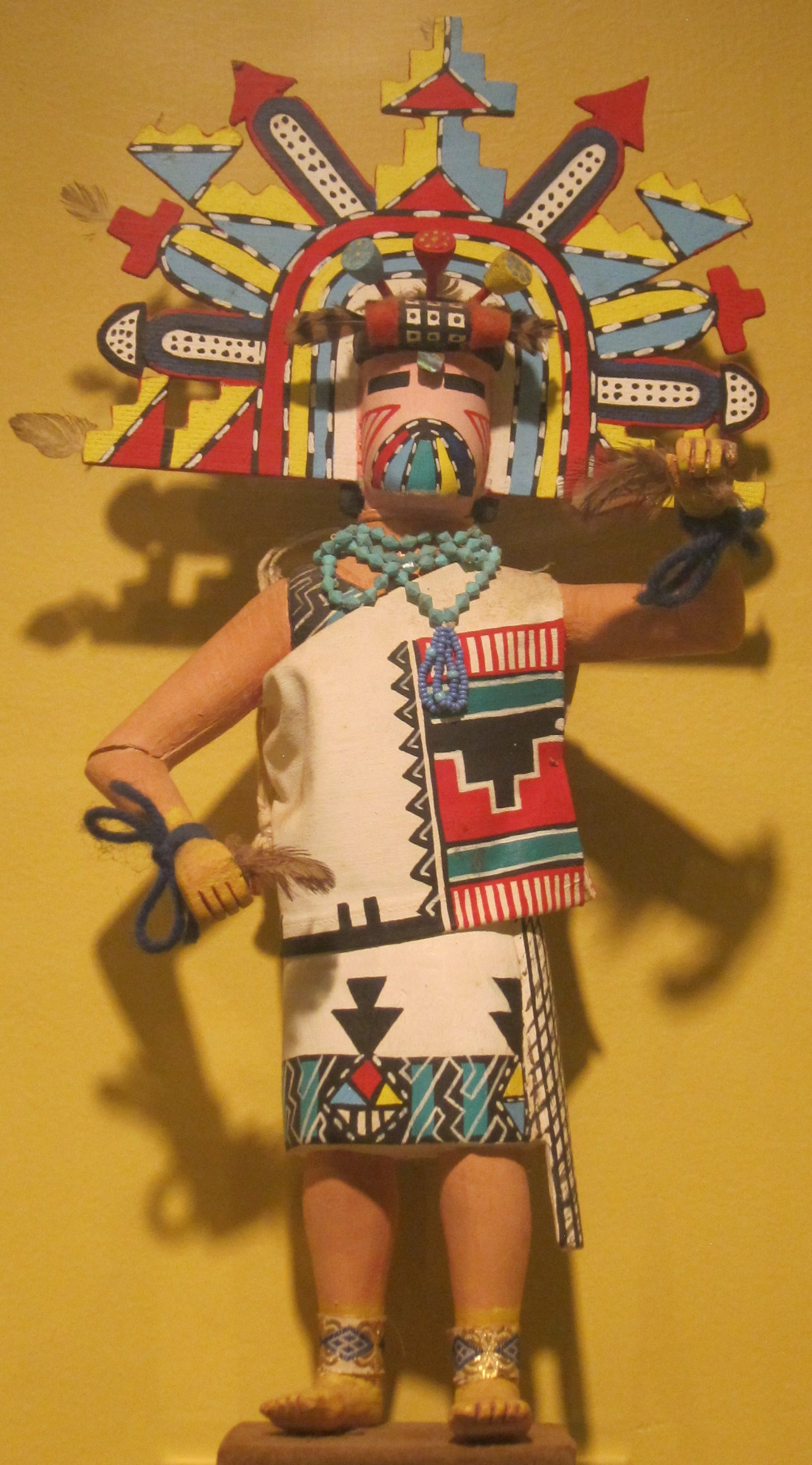
Polik-mana (butterfly maiden) kachina, Arizona, Hopi people, Honolulu Museum of Art

Polik-mana or Butterfly Maiden is a kachina, or spirit being, in Hopi mythology. Every spring she dances from flower to flower, pollinating the fields and flowers and bringing life-giving rain to the Arizona desert. She is represented by a woman dancer at the yearly Butterfly Dance, a traditional initiation rite for Hopi girls. The rite takes place in late summer, before the harvest, to give thanks to Polik-mana for her spring dance. Hopi girls participating in the Butterfly Dance wear ornate headdresses called kopatsoki.

The Polik-mana Mons, a mountain on Venus, is named for the Butterfly Maiden.
