= Abeona Mons =

Mons on Venus

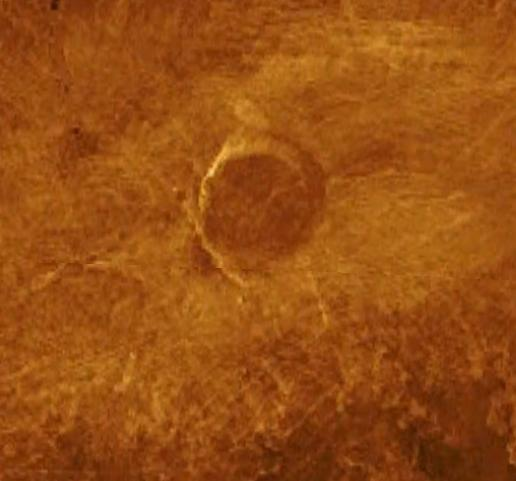
- Abeona Mons
- Feature type: Mountain
- Coordinates: 44.8°S 273.1°E
- Diameter: 375 km
- Eponym: Abeona

Abeona Mons is a mountain on Venus named after Abeona the Roman goddess of travelers.
