= Freyja Montes =

Montes on Venus

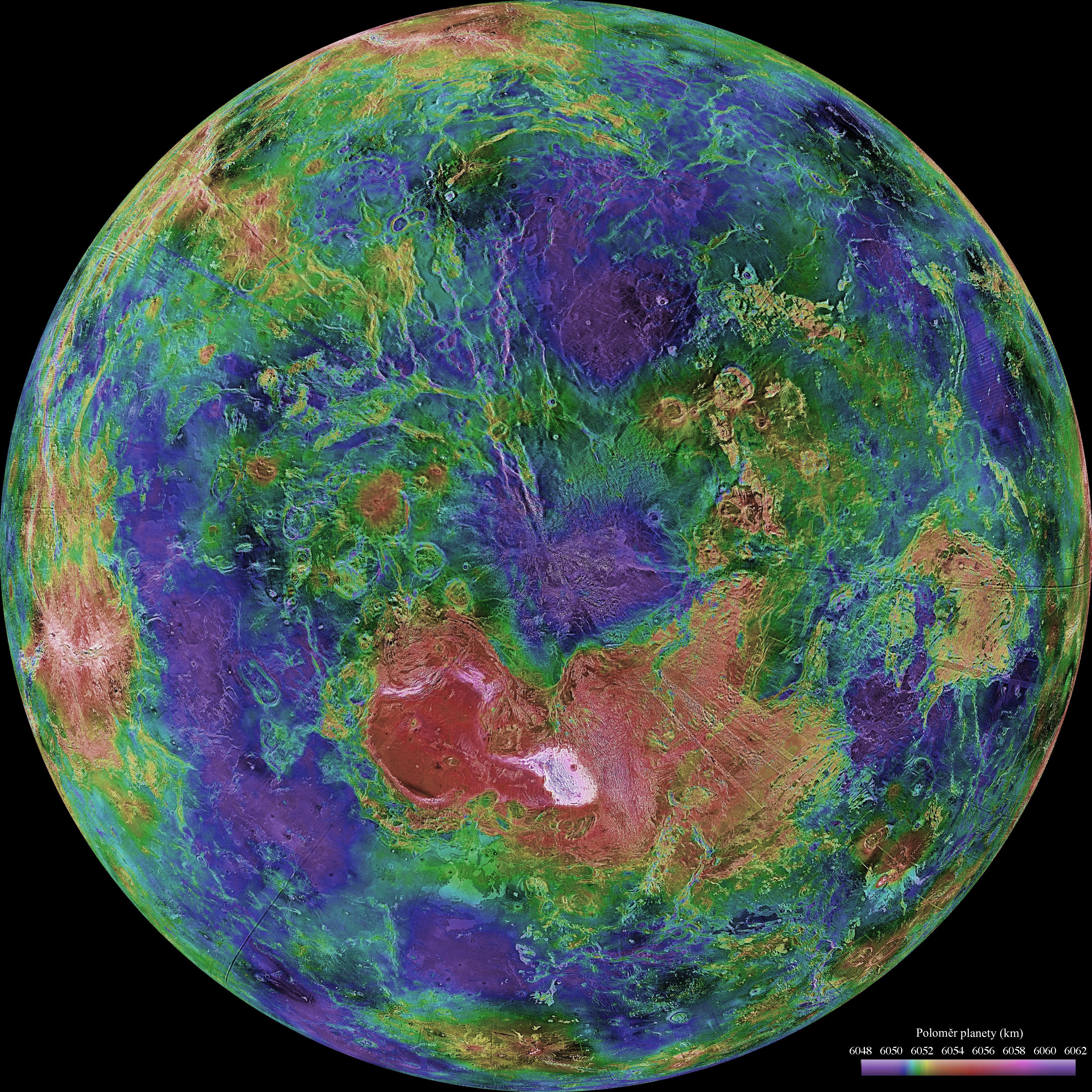
- NASA image of northern Venus topography
- Feature type: Montes
- Location: Venus
- Diameter: 579 km
- Eponym: Norse, mother of Odin

The Freyja Montes are one of the big four mountain ranges of the planet Venus. They are located at 74.1° N latitude and 333.8° E longitude. Most of the planet's elevated terrain is located in its northern hemisphere.

"Freyja" is derived from Norse, referring to the mother of Odin. The name was approved in 1979.
