= Danu Montes =

Montes on Venus

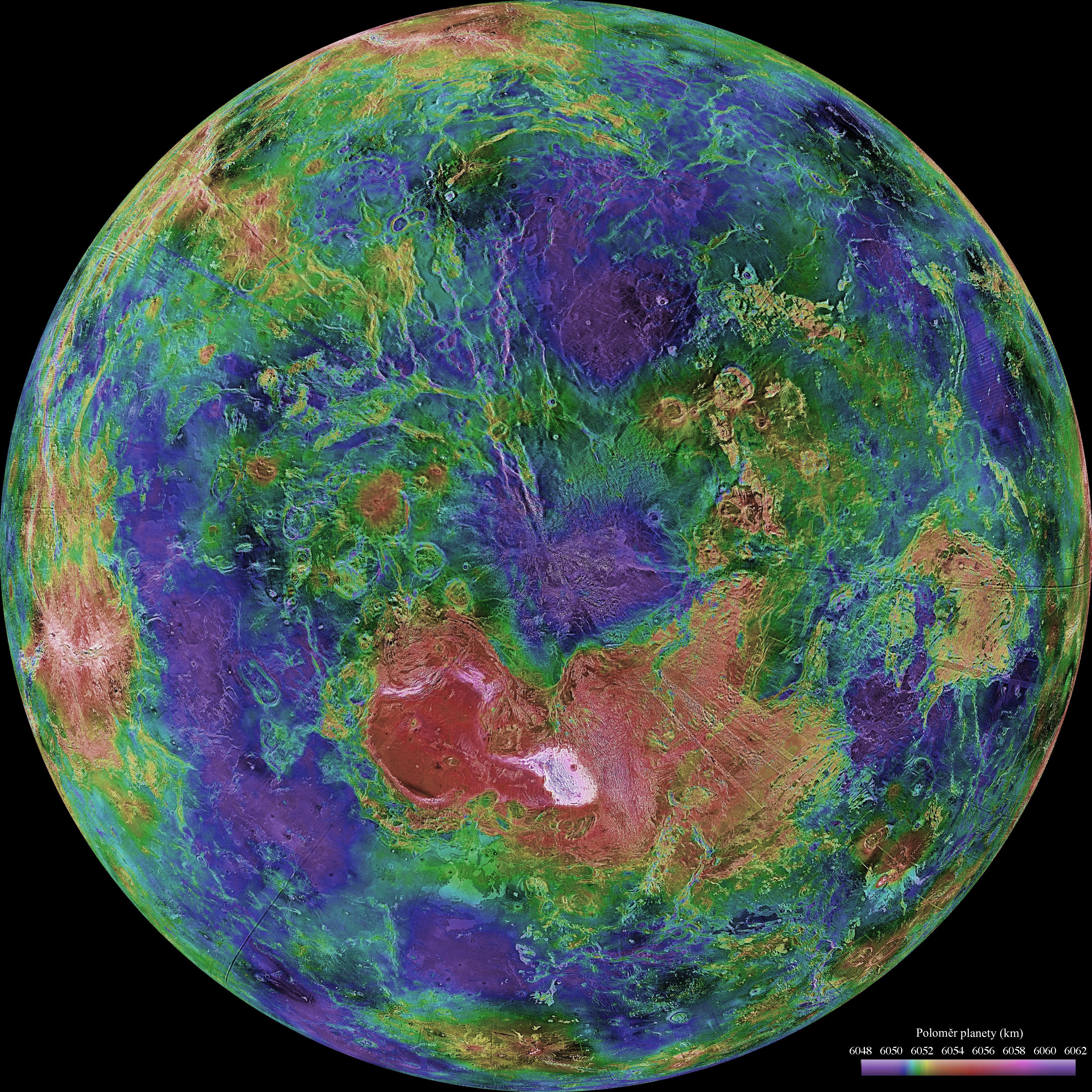
- NASA image of northern Venus topography
- Feature type: Montes
- Location: Venus
- Diameter: 808 km
- Eponym: Danu (Celtic), Celtic mother of gods.

The Danu Montes are a large surface feature on the surface of Venus, which has a diameter of 808 km. It is one of the planet's four main mountain ranges. They are centered at 60 degrees north latitude, 324.5 degrees east longitude. The northern extremity is comparable to Scandinavia, northern Russia, and Alaska on Earth. They have an angular, fractured appearance and seem to zigzag. Adjacent planum are likely volcanically formed.

Most features on Venus are named for women; the prefix "danu-" is found in the Danube river and Danu, a mythological Irish goddess. The name was approved by the International Astronomical Union in the year 1985.
