= Akna Montes =

Montes on Venus

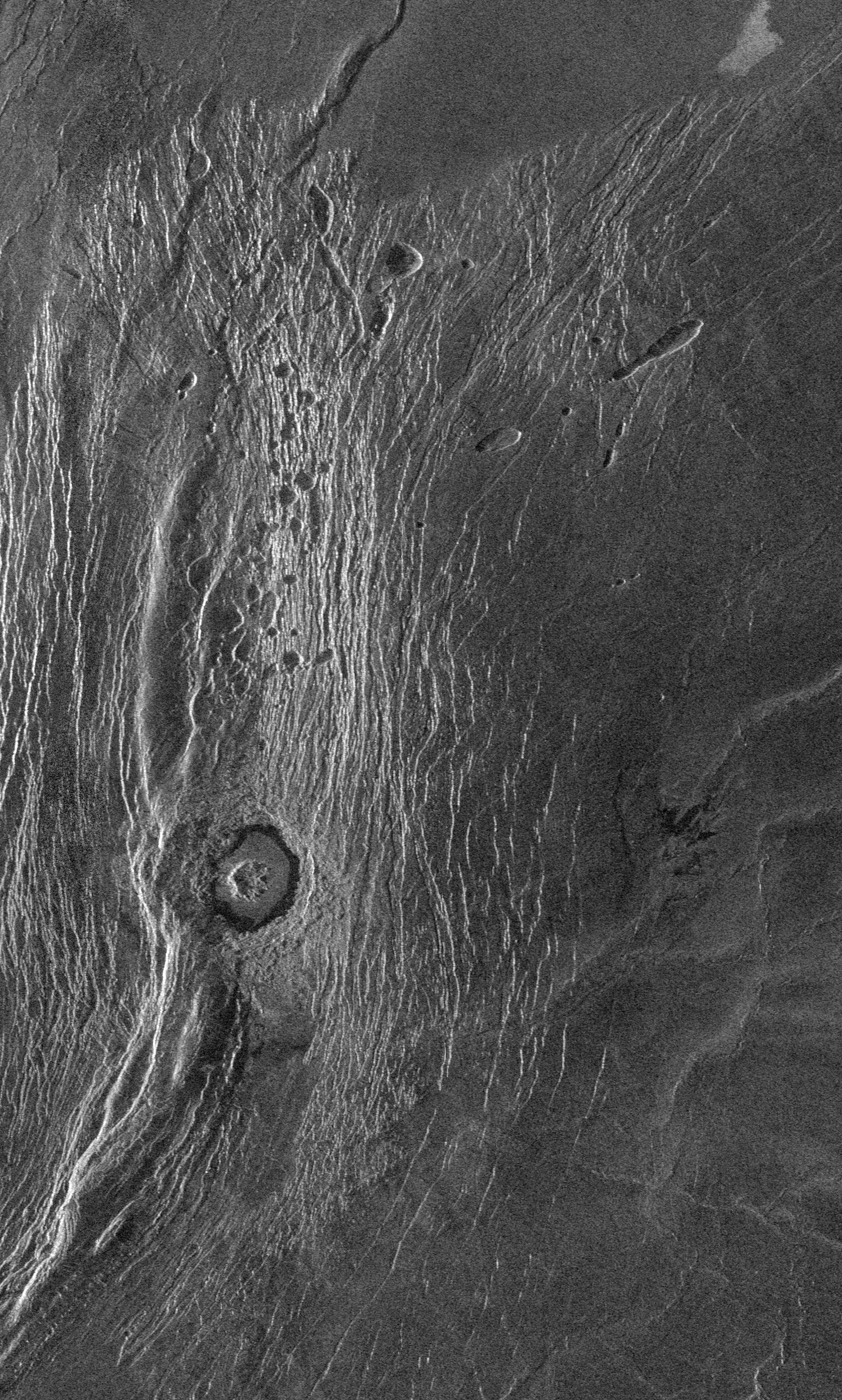
- Magellan radar image of the northern portion of the Akna Montes. The round feature is the crater Wanda.
- Feature type: Montes
- Coordinates: 68.9°N 318.2°E
- Diameter: 830 km
- Eponym: Akna

Akna Montes are a mountain range on Venus centered at 68.9°N, 318.2°E and stretching 830 km long.

The Akna range is a north–south trending ridge belt that forms the western border of the elevated smooth plateau of Lakshmi Planum. The Lakshmi plateau plains are formed by extensive volcanic eruptions and are bounded by mountain chains on all sides. The plains appear to be deformed near the mountains. This suggests that some of the mountain building activity occurred after the plains formed.
