= Emily Lakdawalla =

Planetary geologist and writer

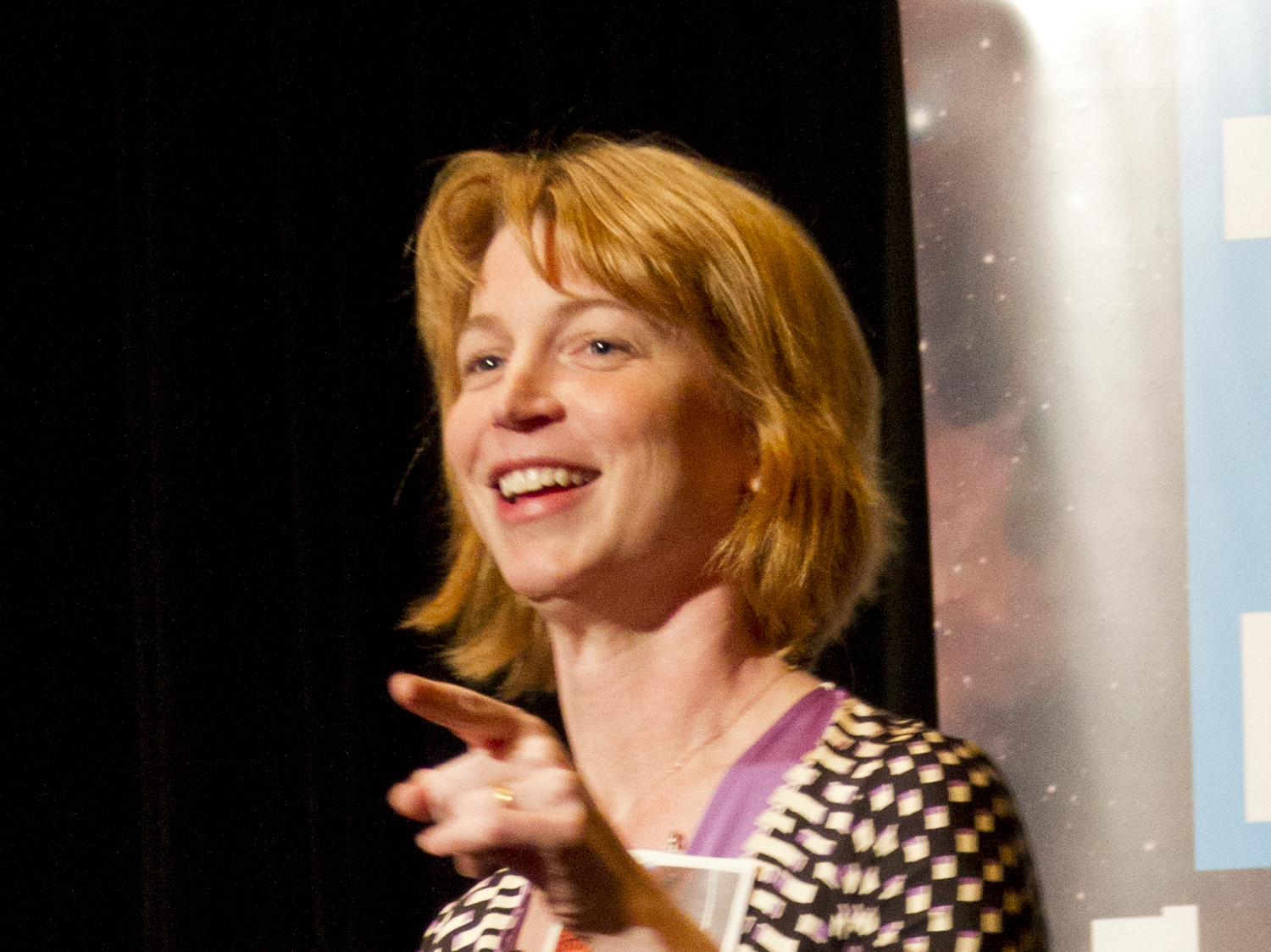
- Lakdawalla at 2013 Lunar and Planetary Science Conference
- Born: February 8, 1975 (age 51); Delaware, U.S.
- Citizenship: United States
- Education: Amherst College (BA); Brown University (MS)
- Spouse: Darius Lakdawalla
- Children: 2
- Awards: Jonathan Eberhart Planetary Journalism Award (2011) from Division for Planetary Sciences of the American Astronomical Society
- Scientific career
- Fields: planetary geology
- Workplaces: The Planetary Society
- Website: planetary.org/blogs/

Emily Stewart Lakdawalla (born February 8, 1975) is an American planetary geologist and former Senior Editor of The Planetary Society, contributing as both a science writer and a blogger. She has also worked as a teacher and as an environmental consultant. She has performed research work in geology, Mars topography, and science communication and education. Lakdawalla is a science advocate and communicator.

== Education ==
In 1996, Lakdawalla was awarded her Bachelor of Arts degree in geology from Amherst College. In 2000 she received her Master of Science degree in planetary geology from Brown University.

== Career ==
After completing her studies at Amherst, Lakdawalla spent two years, from 1996 through 1998, teaching fifth and sixth grade science at Lake Forest Country Day School in Lake Forest, Illinois.

In 1997, inspired by a space simulation project using images returning from the Galileo mission of two of Jupiter's moons, Io and Europa, Lakdawalla decided to undertake independent research in structural geology.

=== Research ===
At Amherst, Lakdawalla worked to study deformed metasedimentary rocks of northeastern Washington. Working at Brown concurrently, she performed analyses of radar images received from Magellan, while also processing topographic data taken of the Baltis Vallis region on Venus, in order to model its geological history.

Lakdawalla has published research on the topography of a putative stratovolcano on Mars, recorded by the Mars Orbiter Laser Altimeter. She has also worked with an international team to analyze returned Mars rover data, and to evaluate Devon Island as a test site for unmanned aerial vehicles (UAVs) developed for use on Mars.

Lakdawalla's work with Pamela Gay, et al., on the immersion of audiences in interactive educational astronomy content, has been cited by further research into social media content classification and delivery of content types through social media.

Lakdawalla has also engaged in advocacy for citizen science research projects, especially those involving space exploration, such as CosmoQuest and Zooniverse.

=== The Planetary Society ===
In 2001, Lakdawalla joined The Planetary Society as a deputy project manager of the Society's Red Rover Goes to Mars project, an educational and public outreach program on the Mars Exploration Rover mission funded by The Lego Group. In 2002, in support of training exercises for Mars rover operations, she administered an international competition, which selected secondary school students for training and travel to Pasadena, California for participation in these exercises. In early 2005, this competition and selection was performed again for actual Mars Exploration Rover mission operations.

During a research operation on Devon Island (located in the Canadian high Arctic), which was funded by The Planetary Society, where a team worked to test the location as a potential analogue for unmanned aerial vehicles to be deployed on Mars, Lakdawalla began writing for the Society's online publications. For several years, she wrote web news articles, as well as making contributions to the society's print publications, including The Planetary Report, where she assumed chief editorial responsibilities in September 2018. Lakdawalla left the Planetary Society in September 2020.

=== Writing ===
Lakdawalla is a contributing editor to Sky & Telescope magazine, for which she has written articles about Mars, the Moon, outer planets, spacecraft imaging, and Kuiper belt objects. She has written a book about the design and engineering of the Curiosity rover mission, published in 2018, and is working on a second book, about the scientific discoveries of Curiosity, to be published in 2019.

Starting in September 2013, Lakdawalla has penned the monthly "In the Press" column for Nature Geoscience.

== Media appearances ==
Lakdawalla is a regular contributor to the weekly Planetary Radio podcast.

Following Bill Nye's installation as The Planetary Society's Executive Director, Lakdawalla has appeared on television, in webcasts, on Google+ Hangouts, and on Snapshots from Space, viewable from The Planetary Society's YouTube channel.

Lakdawalla has been a host for CosmoQuest's Science Hour, interviewing guests, including Bill Nye, about the future of planetary exploration.

In an interview with Brad Allen, Lakdawalla discussed the path that led to a career in science communication, the state of human space exploration and current space exploration missions, such as the Mars Science Laboratory.

In a December 2013 interview with Universe Today, Lakdawalla discussed candidate locations for life in the Solar System based on geological activity and presence of water. In addition to Europa, Lakdawalla cited Enceladus (a moon of Saturn), due to its active salty geysers:

"Those geysers are salty – it's a salt water ocean, so we basically have a world that is conveniently venting its ocean out into space. You don't even have to land – you can just fly right through that plume and check to see what kinds of cool chemistry is happening there. So yeah, I think Enceladus would be a really cool place to explore for life."

Lakdawalla has been interviewed on topics such as China's Jade Rabbit moon rover on NPR's All Things Considered, and she has also appeared on BBC America and BBC World News.

== Awards and honors ==
In 2011, Lakdawalla received the Jonathan Eberhart Planetary Sciences Journalism Award from the Division for Planetary Sciences of the American Astronomical Society for her reporting on the Phoebe ring of Saturn.

Asteroid 274860 Emilylakdawalla, discovered by German astronomers Matthias Busch and Rainer Kresken at the ESA Optical Ground Station in 2009, was named in her honor. The official naming citation was published by the Minor Planet Center on July 12, 2014 (M.P.C. 89086).

== Personal life ==
Lakdawalla resides in Los Angeles with her husband, economist Darius Lakdawalla. The couple originally met when attending Amherst together as undergraduates in the early 1990s. They have two daughters.

== Selected works ==
- Lakdawalla, Emily (January 3, 2009). "Five Years of Spirit on Mars [podcast]". 365 Days of Astronomy.
- Lakdawalla, Emily (October 14, 2009). "The Phoebe ring". The Planetary Society.
- Lakdawalla, Emily (January 2010). "Spacecraft Imaging for Amateurs". Sky & Telescope.
- Lakdawalla, Emily (September 2013). "The history of water on Mars". Sky & Telescope. 126 (3): 16–22. Bibcode:2013S&T...126c..16L.
- Lakdawalla, Emily (2014) [23 December 2013]. "The day the Earth smiled". Nature Geoscience. 7 (1): 4. Bibcode:2014NatGe...7....4L. doi:10.1038/ngeo2048.
- Lakdawalla, Emily (2018). The Design and Engineering of Curiosity: How the Mar Rover Performs Its Job. Springer Praxis Books. Springer International Publishing AG. doi:10.1007/978-3-319-68146-7. ISBN 978-3-319-68144-3.

== See also ==
- Darius Lakdawalla
- Neil deGrasse Tyson
- Phil Plait
