= The Jodcast =

Astronomy podcast

- The Jodcast Logo
- Genre: Astronomy
- Language: English

Production
- Length: 60-90 minutes

Technical specifications
- Audio format: MP3

Publication
- Original release: 14 January 2006; 20 years ago

Related
- Website: www.jodcast.net

The Jodcast is a monthly podcast created by astronomers at Jodrell Bank Centre for Astrophysics (JBCA), University of Manchester in Manchester, England. It debuted in January 2006, aiming to inspire and inform the public about astronomy and related sciences, to excite young people with the latest astronomy research results, to motivate students to pursue careers in science, and to dispel stereotypes of scientists as incomprehensible and unapproachable.

The Jodcast provides insight into up-to-date astronomical and astrophysical research via regular interviews with researchers from institutions worldwide, as well as with its own staff at the University of Manchester. Episodes also feature interviews with JBCA PhD students during Jodbites to promote early-career researchers and to offer a unique perspective to life in academia. The Jodcast team also regularly interacts with listeners and answers questions related to astronomy and astrophysics during its monthly Ask an Astronomer segments. The ever-popular Night Sky segment has not returned in 2024, following the passing of Prof Ian Morison.

The Jodcast was co-founded by previous Manchester students Stuart Lowe, Nick Rattenbury and David Ault in 2006. Current and previous episodes of the Jodcast may be downloaded via its own website and RSS feeds, and from iTunes. The Jodcast is also regularly collated and integrated into various Internet-based astronomy radio shows.

== Format ==
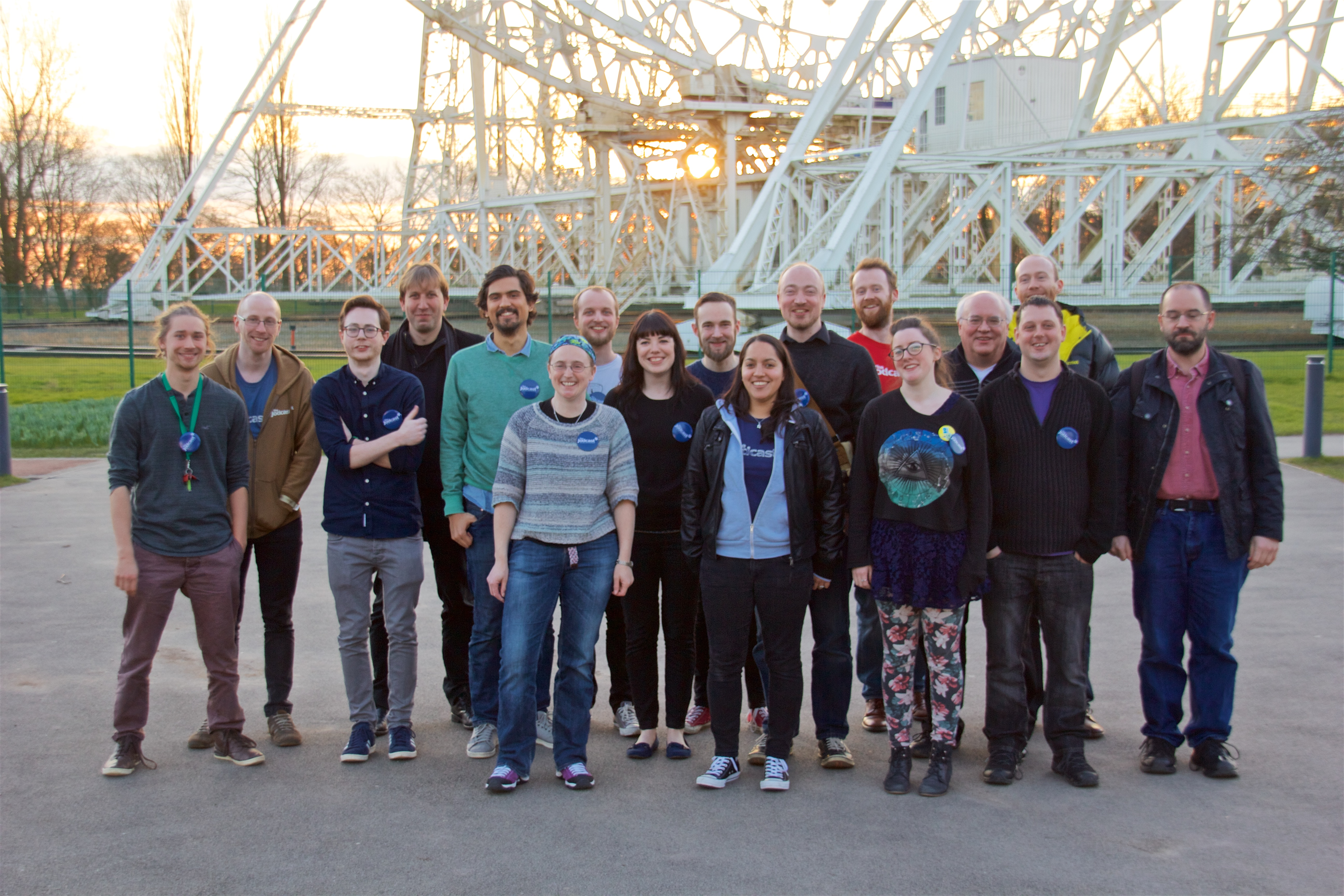
The Jodcast team in 2016

The original format of the Jodcast saw two episodes released every month: one regular episode towards the beginning of the month, and one Extra Episode released halfway through the month. These two episodes would have different formats and included regular features such as: interviews with prominent forefront researchers in astronomy and astrophysics; monthly overviews of sights in the night sky for amateur astronomers in both the Northern and Southern hemispheres; and Ask an Astronomer, where listener questions were answered by staff at Jodrell Bank Observatory (JBO). Following a 3 year hiatus, the Jodcast returned as a monthly release with News, Ask an Astronomer and Jodbite segments incorporated into the episodes.

=== Regular Episodes ===
Each Jodcast episode features three presenters who introduce upcoming show segments, discuss listener feedback and provide commentary on topics mentioned on each episode. An Odd and End segment is also provided by the episode's presenters, where current topical news articles and research papers (often of a humorous nature) are discussed.

The Jodcast News is the first segment featured during each regular episode. It compiles current astronomy-related affairs and research gathered from existing media, such as print journals, web press releases and news sites into a short (<10 minutes) segment.

Each episode of the Jodcast features an extended interview with a visitor to JBCA/JBO. Visitors are usually academics who discuss their current research topics related to astronomy, space science or astrophysics. As visitors are often at JBCA/JBO to present research, collaborate with colleagues, or attend conferences or events such as BBC Stargazing Live, Jodcast interviews cover the most current and exciting topics in astronomy including: gravitational waves, pulsar astronomy, black holes, exoplanets, and the hunt for extraterrestrial life. The Jodcast routinely features interviews with extremely prominent figures.

The Night Sky section (no longer included since the 2024 comeback) used to be a monthly segment for amateur astronomers focusing on the objects which may be seen in the Northern hemisphere night sky with the unaided eye, or affordable equipment each month. Written and narrated by the former president of the Society for Popular Astronomy, Ian Morison since its inception it was a permanent feature of the original Jodcast episodes. Following requests from listeners, the Jodcast also began a Southern hemisphere night sky section, which was written and produced by astronomers at Space Place at Carter Observatory in Wellington, New Zealand.

=== Extra Episodes ===
During mid-month Extra Episodes the Jodcast used to replace its News and Night Sky segments with Ask an Astronomer and Jodbite segments, these are now semi-permanent features in the monthly episodes.

The Ask an Astronomer segment of the Jodcast presents questions provided by listeners and answered by various JBCA/JBO astronomers. Questions are collected via the Jodcast website's feedback page through letters and postcards, and from the Jodcast's various social media outlets. Questions are then carefully collated and researched, before being answered on the show. Frequently questions regard items previously featured on the show, and current affairs from the wider world of science.

Jodbite segments follow the same format as regular episode's interviews, except for their shorter duration and focus on the work of current JBCA/JBO staff and researchers.

=== Special Episodes ===
In accordance with its aim to educate a worldwide audience on current important astronomy-related affairs, the Jodcast often creates special episodes dedicated to astronomy-related conferences such as the UK Royal Astronomical Society National Astronomy Meeting, and International Astronomical Union General Assemblies, complete with interviews and material obtained live on-site. Other special episodes include: live episode with studio audiences in 2009 and 2016; and various video episodes featuring on-site tours of telescopes such as e-MERLIN and LOFAR.

== Notable interviews ==
Interviews with astronomers external to Manchester University are a regular feature on the Jodcast, and cover a diverse range of astronomical and astrophysical topics. Prominent figures in astronomy and astrophysics have often appeared as guests on the Jodcast including: Sir Bernard Lovell, a key figure in the establishment of Jodrell Bank Observatory; discoverer of pulsars, Dame Jocelyn Bell Burnell; and astronaut, Buzz Aldrin. A list of notable Jodcast interviews is provided below.

Guest	Episode	Topic
Rob Adam	Nov 2018 Extra	Development of the Square Kilometre Array and the future of African astronomy
Buzz Aldrin	Apr Extra 2015	Research and career of Buzz Aldrin
Stephen Baxter	Mar Extra 2017	Science and science fiction
Dame Jocelyn Bell Burnell	Jun 2007	Discovery of pulsars,
	Nov 2017 Extra	Advocating for women in science
Frank Close	Dec Extra 2015	The life and research of Bruno Pontecorvo
Brian Cox	Jan Extra 2011	Neutrino astronomy
Bernie Fanaroff	Nov 2018 Extra	Development of the Square Kilometre Array and the future of African astronomy
Lucie Green	Feb 2016	The Solar Orbiter satellite
Chris Lintott	Various	Galaxy Zoo and the Zooniverse project
Sir Bernard Lovell	Feb 2007	Origins of Jodrell Bank Observatory
	Sep–Oct 2007	An audience with Sir Bernard Lovell
	Jul Extra 2009	Lead-up to the 1969 Moon landing
Katie Mack	Feb 2019	Cosmology and science communication
Ian Morison	May 2017	Professional radio astronomy/Amateur optical astronomy
Bobby Seagull	Dec 2019	Mathematics in astronomy and its advocacy among the public
Jill Tarter	Jan 2015	Various SETI
Matt Taylor	Apr Extra 2015	Philae spacecraft and scientific findings of the Rosetta Mission
	Feb 2016	The end of the Rosetta Mission and public scientific communication
Jess Wade	TBC	Science engagement and representation of women in science
Dara Ó Briain	Jan Extra 2011	Astronomy and Stargazing Live

== Funding ==
The Jodcast has been funded by the Particle Physics and Astronomy Research Council, the British Institute of Physics, and the Science and Technology Facilities Council.

== Related Podcasts ==
The Jodcast team has previously contributed to notable podcasts such as 365 Days of Astronomy and BBC Radio 5 Live's Outriders. Team members are regular contributors to BBC Radio 5 Live's Up All Night with Rhod Sharp. It collates and maintains a list of radio shows and podcasts on topics related to the fields of astronomy, astrophysics and space science for educational purposes.

== See also ==
- Astronomy Cast
- Planetary Radio
- Universe Today
- NASAcast
