= The Space Show =

Internet radio talk show about outer space

- Genre: Space

Cast and voices
- Hosted by: David Livingston

Production
- Length: 60–90 minutes

Technical specifications
- Audio format: MP3

Publication
- No. of episodes: 4,209 (As of 31 May 2024)
- Original release: June 13, 2001
- Updates: Tuesday 7 p.m. Sunday 12 p.m.

The Space Show is an Internet radio talk show about the development of outer space commerce and space tourism, and the issues impacting their development. It is also available archived online as a podcast. It airs two to four times per week, is hosted by Dr. David Livingston (born June 4, 1946), and features live guest interviews with call-in and email questions from listeners.

According to Livingston, the show started in 2001 as Business without Boundaries on a small Arizona radio station, which added Internet audio streaming later. When the show moved to Seattle in 2002, it was renamed The Space Show and aired on, and streamed from, KKNW.

The Space Show has now presented over 4,000 shows. Frequent guests on the show include science journalist and historian Robert Zimmerman, physicist Dr. John Brandenberg, and engineering professor Dr. Haym Benaroya. Pete Worden, center director for NASA's Ames Research Center, described himself as a "reformed zealot" about space-based solar power systems on the show.

Livingston earned his MBA in 1978, and his Doctorate of Business Administration from Golden Gate University in 2001. Livingston and the show have been quoted by NBC News in 2006 and Fox News in 2009 regarding progress in civilian space funding and execution, specifically SpaceShipOne, and the reentry of the doomed Russian Phobos-Grunt Mars spacecraft in 2011.

The Space Show hosted, with Livingston moderating, the American Institute of Aeronautics and Astronautics panel review of the 2009 Augustine Commission on future U.S. human space flight.

Philip Harris has described the show as "a platform for knowledgeable, educational exchanges on humanity's space future and opportunities". In 2004, Fraser Cain, publisher of Universe Today and co-host of Astronomy Cast, described The Space Show as a "favorite" and that he was "astonished and jealous at the caliber of guests".
