= Praveetha Patalay =

British academics

- Patalay in 2017
- Education: University College London
- Scientific career
- Workplaces: University of Liverpool; University College London
- Thesis: Developmental complexity, structural simplicity : a longitudinal, multi-method investigation of internalising and externalising symptoms in young people (2015)

Praveetha Patalay is a British academic who is a professor of population health and wellbeing at University College London. She is interested in the development, risks and consequences of poor mental health. She was awarded the Economic and Social Research Council Prize for Impact on Public Policy.

== Early life and education ==
Patalay was born in the UK, but moved to India as a child and grew up in Hyderabad. She did not have a television at home, but enjoyed sports and reading. She completed her undergraduate studies in psychology, literature and politics in India. After returning to the UK, she completed a master's degree in developmental psychology, and worked as a research assistant for a mental health project in a school. She has said that she was inspired by her grandmother, who refused an arranged marriage and campaigned for women's health.

Patalay received her PhD from the Department of Clinical, Educational and Health Psychology at University College London. Her doctoral research investigated the effect on academic achievement of the onset of mental disorders at important developmental in adolescence. Her doctorate was recognised by the British Psychological Society Award for Outstanding Doctoral Research Contributions to Psychology. She was a postdoctoral researcher at the Centre for Longitudinal Studies.

== Research and career ==
Patalay was a lecturer in Population Mental Health and Child Development at the University of Liverpool where she worked alongside Suzi Gage. Together they showed that the prevalence of mental health problems was increasing and substance use behaviours were decreasing in millennial adolescents. Patalay is interested in how mental health is impacted by inequality, geography and culture. She works to reduce stigma around poor mental health and promote mental wellbeing.

Patalay studied the mental health challenges facing young people with Emla Fitzsimons on the Millennium Cohort Study. The study explored the differences between mental ill-health and mental wellbeing, and showed that good wellbeing and the absence of mental illness were not always correlated. Their work helped Public Health England to define methods to measure child and adolescent mental health. In children aged 14, she found very high rates (24%) of depressive symptoms in girls.

== Awards and honours ==
- Economic and Social Research Council Prize for Impact on Public Policy
- Forbes’ 30 under 30 list for Science and Healthcare

== Selected publications ==
- Kirkbride, James; Deidre M. Anglin; Ian Colman; Jennifer Dykxhoorn; Peter B. Jones; Praveetha Patalay; Pitman, Alexandra; Soneson, Emma; Thomas Steare; Talen Wright; Siân Lowri Griffiths (2024). "The social determinants of mental health and disorder: evidence, prevention and recommendations". World Psychiatry. 23 (1): 58–90. doi:10.1002/wps.21160. PMID 38214615. Wikidata Q130132485.
- Olympia L K Campbell; David Bann; Praveetha Patalay (2021). "The gender gap in adolescent mental health: A cross-national investigation of 566,829 adolescents across 73 countries". SSM - population health. 13 100742. doi:10.1016/j.ssmph.2021.100742. PMID 33748389. Wikidata Q115341039.
- Praveetha Patalay; Gage, Suzanne Suzi (2019). "Changes in millennial adolescent mental health and health-related behaviours over 10 years: a population cohort comparison study". International Journal of Epidemiology. 48 (5): 1650–1664. doi:10.1093/ije/dyz006. PMID 30815691. Wikidata Q91992726.

== Personal life ==
Patalay is an artist, and makes jewellery and pottery.
