= Katie Mack =

Katie Mack may refer to:

- Katie Mack (astrophysicist), researcher at the Perimeter Institute
- Katie Mack (cricketer) (born 1993), Australian cricketer
