= Erika Hamden =

American astrophysicist

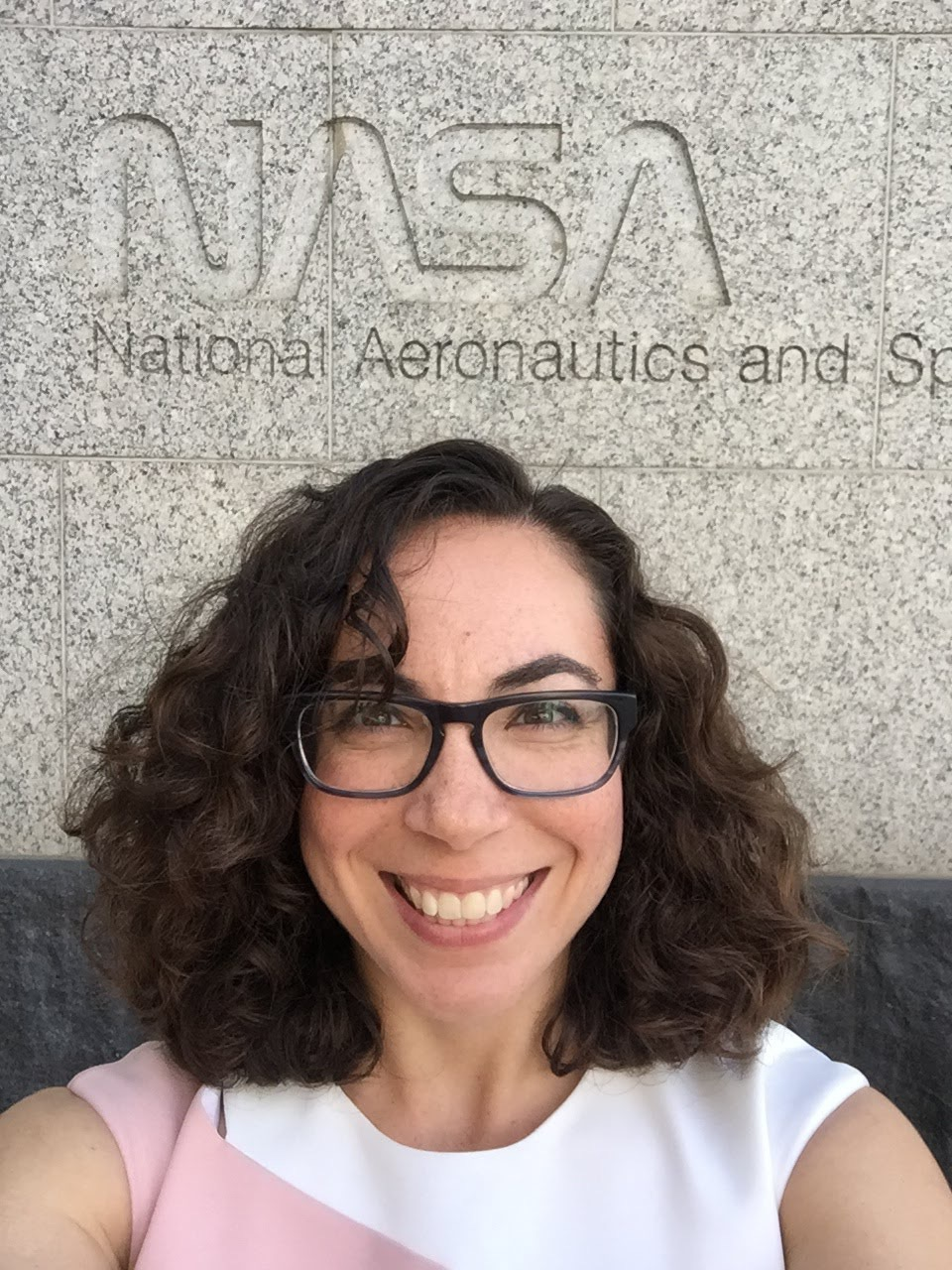
- Born: Erika Tobiason Hamden; Montclair, New Jersey
- Education: Harvard College (AB); Le Cordon Bleu (Dip.); Columbia University (MPhil, MA, PhD)
- Awards: TED Fellow (2019)
- Scientific career
- Fields: Astrophysics
- Workplaces: California Institute of Technology; University of Arizona
- Thesis: FIREBall, CHAS, and the Diffuse Universe (2014)
- Doctoral advisor: David Schiminovich
- Website: ehamden.org

Erika Tobiason Hamden (born 1983) is an American astrophysicist and associate professor at the University of Arizona and Steward Observatory. Her research focuses on developing ultraviolet (UV) detector technology, ultraviolet–visible spectroscopy (UV/VIS) instrumentation and spectroscopy, and galaxy evolution. She served as the project scientist and project manager of a UV multi-object spectrograph, FIREBall-2, that is designed to observe the circumgalactic medium (CGM). She is a 2019 TED fellow.

== Early life and education ==
Hamden was born in Montclair, New Jersey. Hamden studied astrophysics at Harvard College and graduated in 2006. Hamden worked at the Harvard Center for Astrophysics, completing a senior thesis under Andrew Szentgyorgyi. After graduating, she completed a diploma at Le Cordon Bleu in London, before working as a chef in New Jersey. She joined Columbia University for her doctoral studies in 2007, earning a PhD supervised by David Schiminovich in 2014. She worked on the diffuse galactic far UV background using archival GALEX data, far UV bright galactic clouds, UV detector development, and ultraviolet instrumentation. She held a NASA Earth and Space Science fellowship from 2011 to 2014.

== Career and research ==
Hamden joined California Institute of Technology as a postdoctoral researcher, working with Christopher Martin. Here she developed an ultraviolet telescope for a high-altitude balloon, the "Faint Intergalactic medium Redshifted Emission Balloon" (FIREBall-2). FIREBall-2 will observe circumgalactic media (CGM) emission in the ultraviolet. She appeared on the podcast 365 Days of Astronomy. She was a National Science Foundation Astronomy and Astrophysics postdoctoral fellow in 2014. The fellowship allowed her to develop instrumentation to study galaxies in the Keck Cosmic Web Imager redshift range. In 2016 she was the first woman to be awarded a NASA Nancy Roman technology fellowship for her work in detectors. She was made a Robert Andrews Millikan fellow in 2017.

Hamden joined the faculty at the University of Arizona and Steward Observatory in 2018. Here she is building a UV detector lab and continuing work on FIREBall-2 and as the project scientist for the Keck Cosmic Reionization Mapper.

She is interested in silicon detector technologies and Lyman-alpha emission from the circumgalactic media. She has worked on anti-reflective coatings for delta-doped CCDs, helping to improve their efficiency in the ultraviolet. FIREBall-2 was designed to test this new technology. The electron multiplying charge-coupled devices (EMCCDs) can suffer from clock-induced charge and spurious signals and require carefully designed shaped pixel clocks to minimize noise. She has worked as US lead on FIREBall-2 from 2014 to its launch on September 22, 2018. Hamden was present during integration of FIREBall-2 at Fort Sumner in 2018, when a falcon landed in the telescope.

Hamden is a member of the Goddard Space Flight Center Cosmic Origins Science Working Group. She is one of 20 people selected as TED fellow in 2019. Her TED Talk was selected by TED as a highlight of their April 2019 conference, and covered by Wired magazine.

=== Awards and honors ===
Hamden's awards and honors include

- Arizona Space Commission appointment in 2025
- Presidential Early Career Award for Scientists and Engineers
- TED fellow in 2019.
- NASA Nancy Roman Technology Fellowship
- National Science Foundation (NSF) Astronomy and Astrophysics postdoctoral Fellow
- Robert Andrews Millikan Fellow in Experimental Physics
- NASA Earth and Space Science Fellow
