= Jen Gupta =

British astrophysicist

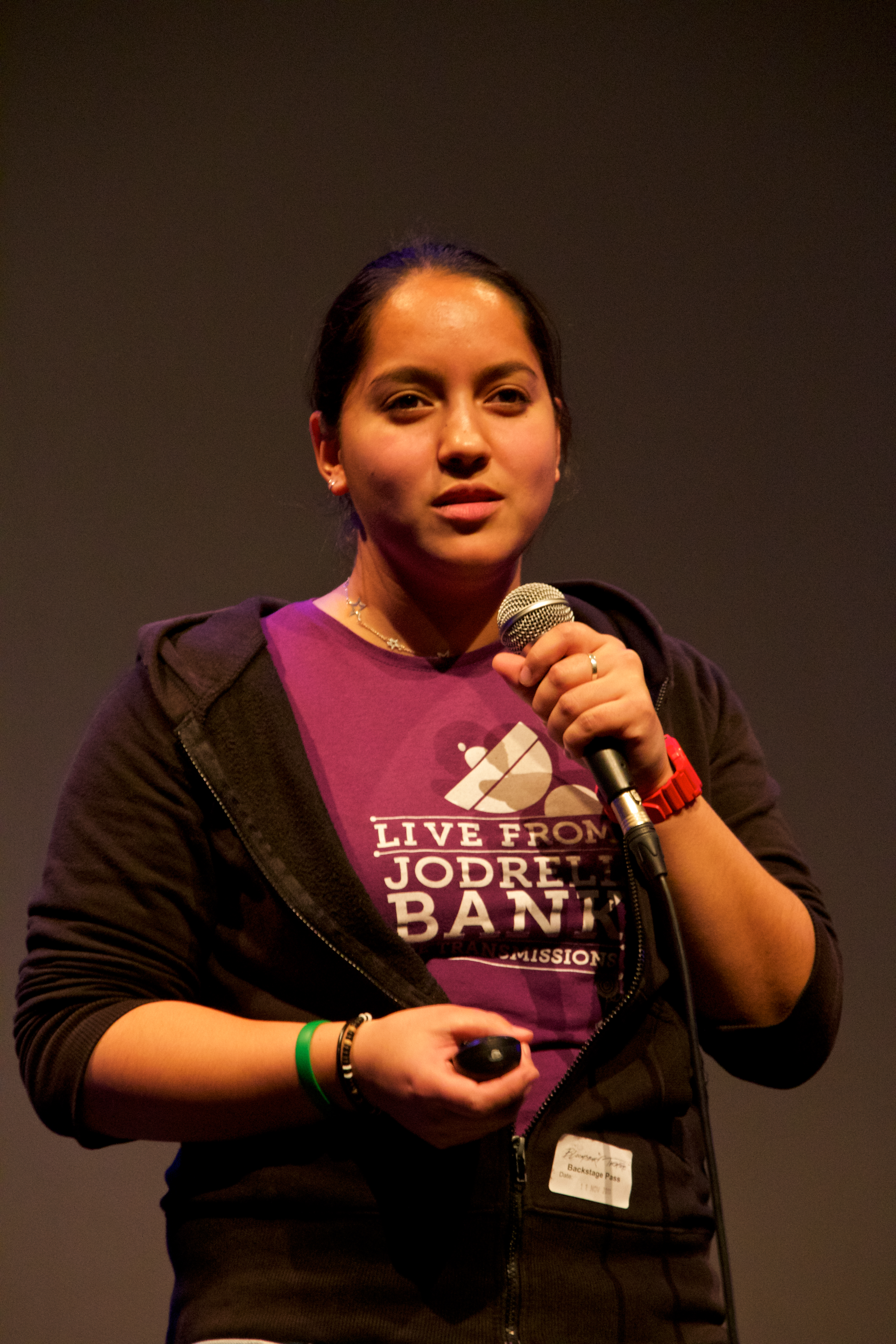
- Born: Jennifer Ann Gupta
- Education: University of Manchester
- Organization: University of Portsmouth
- Known for: Science communication; Active galactic nuclei
- Website: jengupta.com

Jennifer Ann Gupta, known as Jen, is an astrophysicist and science communicator based at the University of Portsmouth. She has presented on Tomorrow's World on the BBC.

== Education ==
Gupta grew up in Winchester and completed her A-Levels at Peters Symonds Sixth Form College. She completed her master's degree at the University of Manchester, before beginning a PhD at the university's Jodrell Bank Centre for Astrophysics. She earned her PhD "Multiwavelength Studies of Radio-loud Active Galactic Nuclei in the Fermi Era" in 2012.

== Career ==
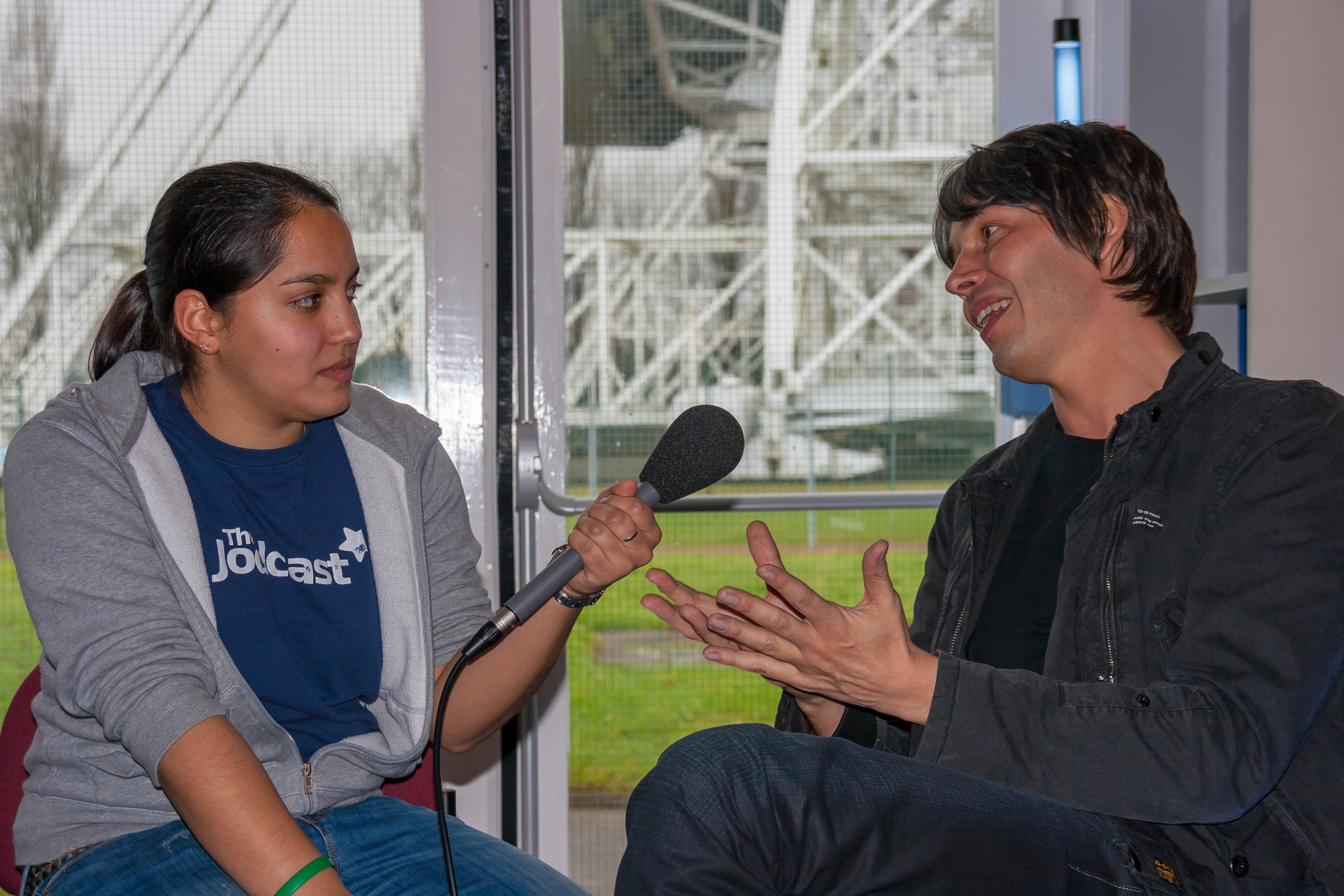
Jen interviewing Brian Cox on The Jodcast

Gupta began science communication during her PhD, taking a major role in The Jodcast and performing astronomy-inspired stand-up comedy on stage at Bright Club, in Manchester and at London's Bloomsbury Theatre. That year she completed a daylong road trip to see the seven MERLIN telescopes in a day. Gupta is involved with the training of UK-based physics teachers. She has the co-hosted a number of episodes of the BBC's Tomorrow's World.

In 2016 she featured in a series of portraits commissioned by the Royal Astronomical Society celebrating leading women in astronomy. That year, she gave an invited talk at the Royal Institution "The invisible night sky". She delivers regular talks at astronomical societies around the South East of England. In 2015 she hosted Stargazing Live from the Portsmouth Historic Dockyard.

Alongside public talks about astronomy, Gupta is interested in science comedy. That year she hosted BAHFest, a celebration of well-argued but incorrect scientific theory. Gupta is the founder and co-host of the Astronomy podcast Seldom Sirius.

In 2011 she won I'm a Scientist, Get me out of here! Gupta joined the Institute of Cosmology and Gravitation at the University of Portsmouth in 2012. She is responsible for outreach, public engagement and evaluation. Gupta typically works with 10,000 school children and members of the public each year.
