= Pamela L. Gay =

American astronomer (born 1973)

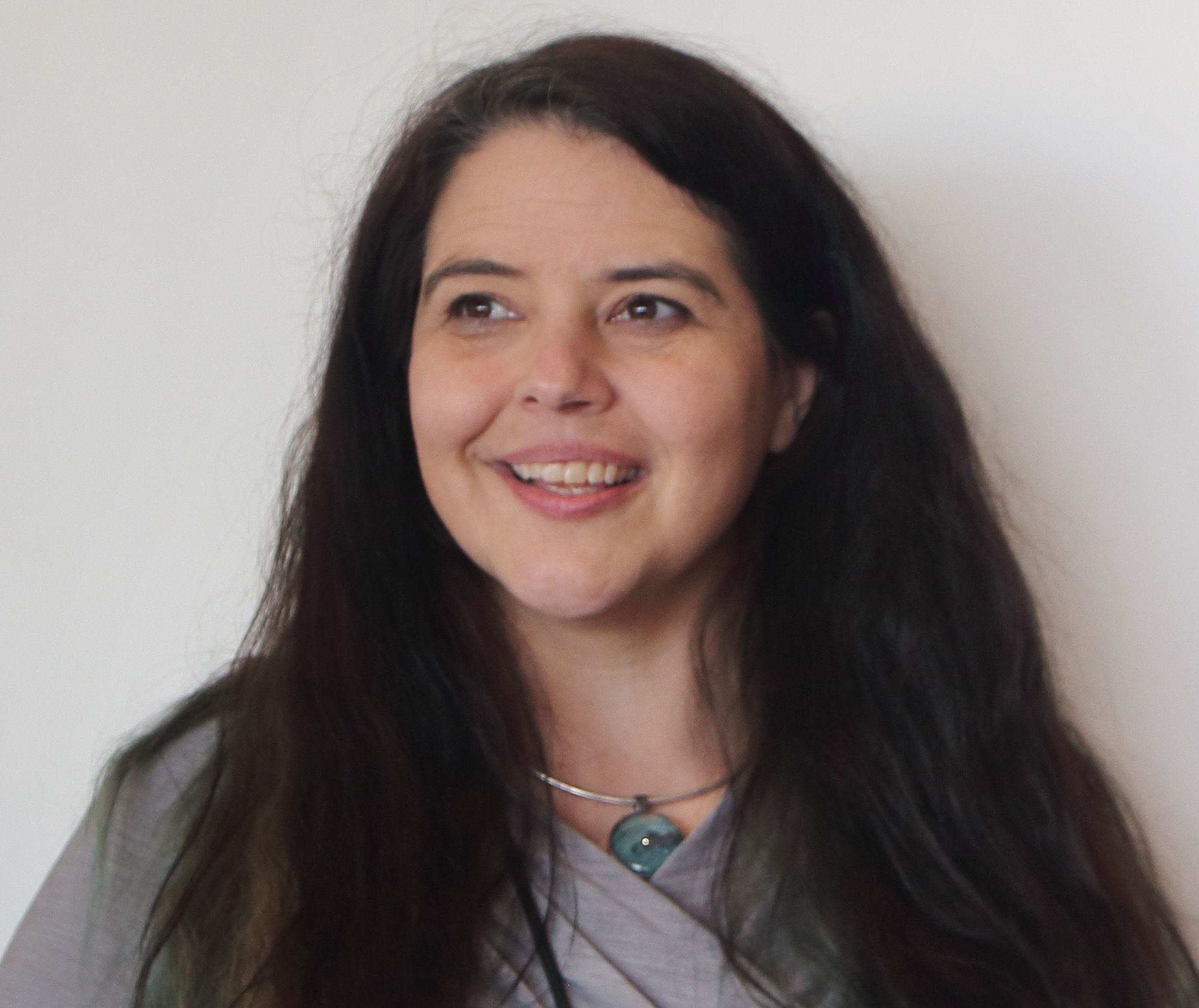
- Pamela Gay at Skepticon Australia in 2018
- Born: December 12, 1973 (age 52); California, United States
- Education: Michigan State University (BS); University of Texas at Austin (PhD)
- Occupation: Astronomy
- Employer(s): Planetary Science Institute, Edwardsville, Illinois
- Known for: Astronomy, education, podcasting

Pamela L. Gay (born December 12, 1973) is an American astronomer, educator, podcaster, and writer, best known for her work in astronomical podcasting and citizen science astronomy projects. She is a senior education and communication specialist and senior scientist for the Planetary Science Institute. Her research interests include analysis of astronomy data, as well as examination of the impact of citizen science initiatives. Gay has also appeared as herself in various television documentary series.

Gay takes part in science popularization efforts and educational outreach as director of CosmoQuest, a citizen science project aimed at engaging the public in astronomy research, speaking on science and scientific skepticism topics internationally, and through educational podcasting.

== Early life and career ==
Gay was born in California and later moved to Westford, Massachusetts, where she attended Westford Academy. Gay received a BS degree in astrophysics from Michigan State University in 1996 and a PhD in astronomy from the University of Texas, Austin, in 2002. She is a senior education and communication specialist and senior scientist for the Planetary Science Institute. Previously, Gay was the director of technology and citizen science for the Astronomical Society of the Pacific, and prior to that, an assistant research professor in the STEM center at Southern Illinois University Edwardsville. Gay was on the council (board of directors) for the American Association of Variable Star Observers, as well as its educational committee chair.

Gay was co-chair of the United States new media efforts with regard to the International Year of Astronomy, 2009.

=== Research ===
Gay's research interests focus primarily on motivating science engagement with media and citizen scientists, as well as data analysis and visualization to engage the public as partners in the analysis of large data sets. Other research interests include RR Lyrae stars with which she collaborates with both professional and amateur astronomers across the world to gather needed data.

While Gay is known for her citizen science and educational outreach work, much of her research has been in galactic astronomy. Gay's work with David Lambert provided confirmation that magnesium (Mg) isotopes are primarily a product of nucleosynthesis in massive stars, and demonstrated that some stars with known "anomalous or peculiar composition are also marked by distinctive isotopic Mg abundances." Gay and Lambert's results have been further cited in research of properties of the fine-structure constant using absorption systems in the spectra of distant quasars.

Gay's work on communication of astronomy has investigated educational trends involving the use of podcasting, using the Slacker Astronomy podcast as a case study. Researchers at the University of Sydney, Australia cited the study, examining podcasting as a means of supporting instruction, leveraging its advantages against student time constraints and potential bandwidth limitations.

Gay's work on Exploring the Motivations of Citizen Science Volunteers examined the Zooniverse project, which developed from the Galaxy Zoo initiative, which started in 2007. Researchers citing this study concluded that "[p]ublic response was extremely positive," garnering over 60 million classifications.

=== CosmoQuest ===
Gay is the Project Director for the citizen science project CosmoQuest. The project is partnered with NASA missions, including NASA's Dawn, the Lunar Reconnaissance Orbiter (LRO), MESSENGER, and Space Telescope Science Institute (STScI) teams, to "build a series of projects that map the surfaces of rocky worlds and explore the atmospheres of planets and small bodies the solar system over."

The project provides an interface for users to assist in identification, mapping and characterization of surface features using visual data provided by NASA missions. Crater counting is described as "a valuable exercise, but it's hard to automate." Surface features, such as the size and degradation of craters, are identified by individual users and submitted back to the project, where they are collected alongside the contributions of other citizen scientists. CosmoQuest projects have included Planet Mappers, Moon Mappers, Asteroid Mappers, and a future project, Planet Investigators. A mobile application is available as part of the Moon Mappers project, Moon Mappers Crater Decay.

CosmoQuest has also provided workshops for educators as well as online astronomy course curricula.

== Educational outreach ==
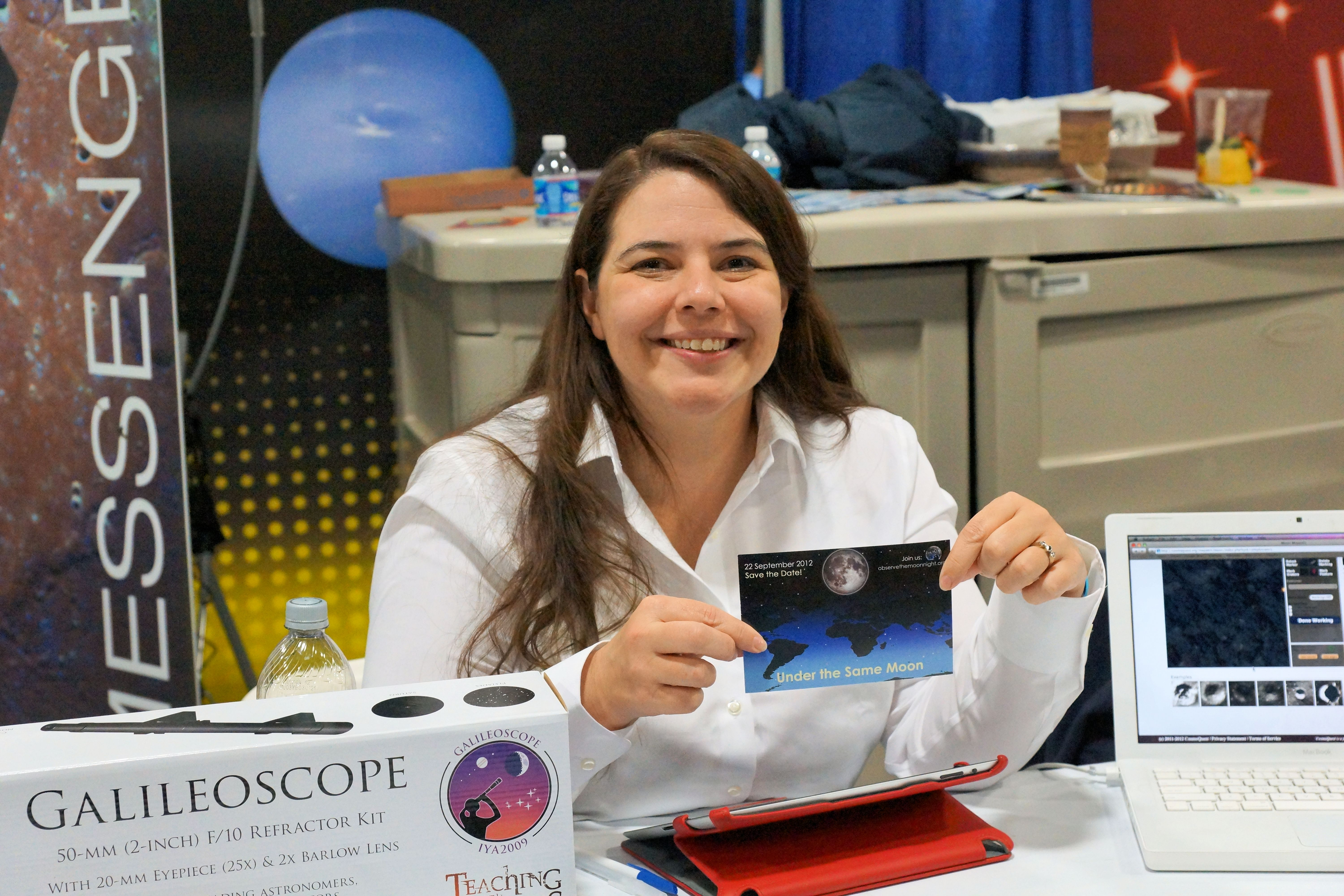
Pamela Gay at the USA Science and Engineering Festival in Washington, DC, April 29, 2012

Gay takes part in astronomy popularization activities and advocates collaboration "to create a community of science within the public." She is a regular astronomy participant in the Virtual Star Party, a weekly video cast featuring professional and amateur astronomers, which was featured in a documentary by Google released at the company's I/O keynote address in San Francisco in June 2012.

Gay also participates in scientific skepticism outreach. In 2011, she was a speaker at The Amaz!ng Meeting (TAM) in Las Vegas, Nevada and participated in a panel alongside Bill Nye, Neil deGrasse Tyson, and others entitled "Our Future in Space," which discussed and debated the role of humans and technology in upcoming space exploration.

At TAM 2012, Gay was a main program speaker, in which she advocated for positive action at the level of the individual to effect solutions to discrimination issues and to seize opportunities to promote scientific collaboration. Gay has also written about her experience regarding gender bias in the field of science and academia.

Gay has been an astronomy speaker at DragonCon in Atlanta, Georgia in 2012 and 2013, where she presented on multiverses, as well as on the "Limits of Skepticism" as part of a panel discussion with Margaret Downey, Tim Farley, Debbie Goddard, D.J. Grothe, and Massimo Pigliucci.

== Podcasting ==
Gay recording one of her podcast episodes.

Gay co-hosts the Astronomy Cast podcast, an educational program which debuted in September 2006, with Fraser Cain. The show covers a variety of topics, including the solar system, cosmology, black holes, and misconceptions about astronomy, and attempts to share "not only what we know, but how we know what we know," according to Cain.

Gay was one of the cofounders of Slacker Astronomy, and was an "on air" personality for the show from February 2005 until the end of its first iteration in September 2006.

In 2008, Gay initiated brainstorming via e-mail on possible "new media" programs for 2009, the International Year of Astronomy (IYA). The discussion included Michael Koppelman from Slacker Astronomy, Phil Plait of Bad Astronomy, and others involved in the IYA, and resulted in the 365 Days Of Astronomy podcast. The podcast was to publish one episode per day over the entire year of 2009 and was originally planned to only run for that year. One of the cornerstones of the IYA was to make astronomy affordable and accessible to everyone in America. To do this 50-power telescopes called Galileoscopes were available for purchase online for only $10 each. "You can actually see the rings of Saturn," exclaims Gay. She was also involved in the New Media Task Group, "We need to communicate all these ideas and get people who don't want to go outside involved online," says Gay.

Since 2009, Gay has been a judge for the Parsec Awards, a set of annual awards created to recognize excellence in science fiction podcasts and podcast novels.

== Awards and honors ==
- American Humanist Association's 2019 Isaac Asimov Science Award
- Sigma Xi Researcher of the Year Award for Southern Illinois University Edwardsville – 2012
- Outstanding Science Educator of the Year Award, The Academy of Science – St. Louis – 2012
- "Best Infotainment" Parsec Award for Astronomy Cast – Finalist 2007 – 2009, 2011 – 2012
- "Best Infotainment" Parsec Award for 365 Days of Astronomy – Finalist 2010 – 2012, Winner 2009

== Personal life ==
Gay lives in southern Illinois with her husband and is also an avid equestrian.

Born in California, Gay has stated that one early source of inspiration came while living in California was "getting to see contrails of the space shuttle as it came to land at Edwards Air Force Base," as well as watching television images from the Voyager missions passing Jupiter in 1979 at age five.

While she was in the second grade, Gay moved with her parents to Westford, Massachusetts, which she describes as a "fairly small town," advantageous for its rural location with dark skies. The town is also home to Haystack Observatory, where she worked during her senior year of high school.

== Media appearances ==
Gay has appeared as herself in various episodes of television series documentaries.

Year	Program	Episode(s)	Notes
2015	The Universe	Episode #9.01 – "Omens of Doom"	TV series documentary
2013	Top Secrets	Episode #1.02 – "Doomsday"	TV series documentary
2012	The Universe	Episode #6.11 – "Deep Freeze"	TV series documentary
2009	The Universe	Episode #4.11 – "Science Fiction, Science Fact"	TV series documentary
2009	The Universe	Episode #4.08 – "Space Wars"	TV series documentary
