= Surface features of Venus =

Global radar map of the surface of Venus

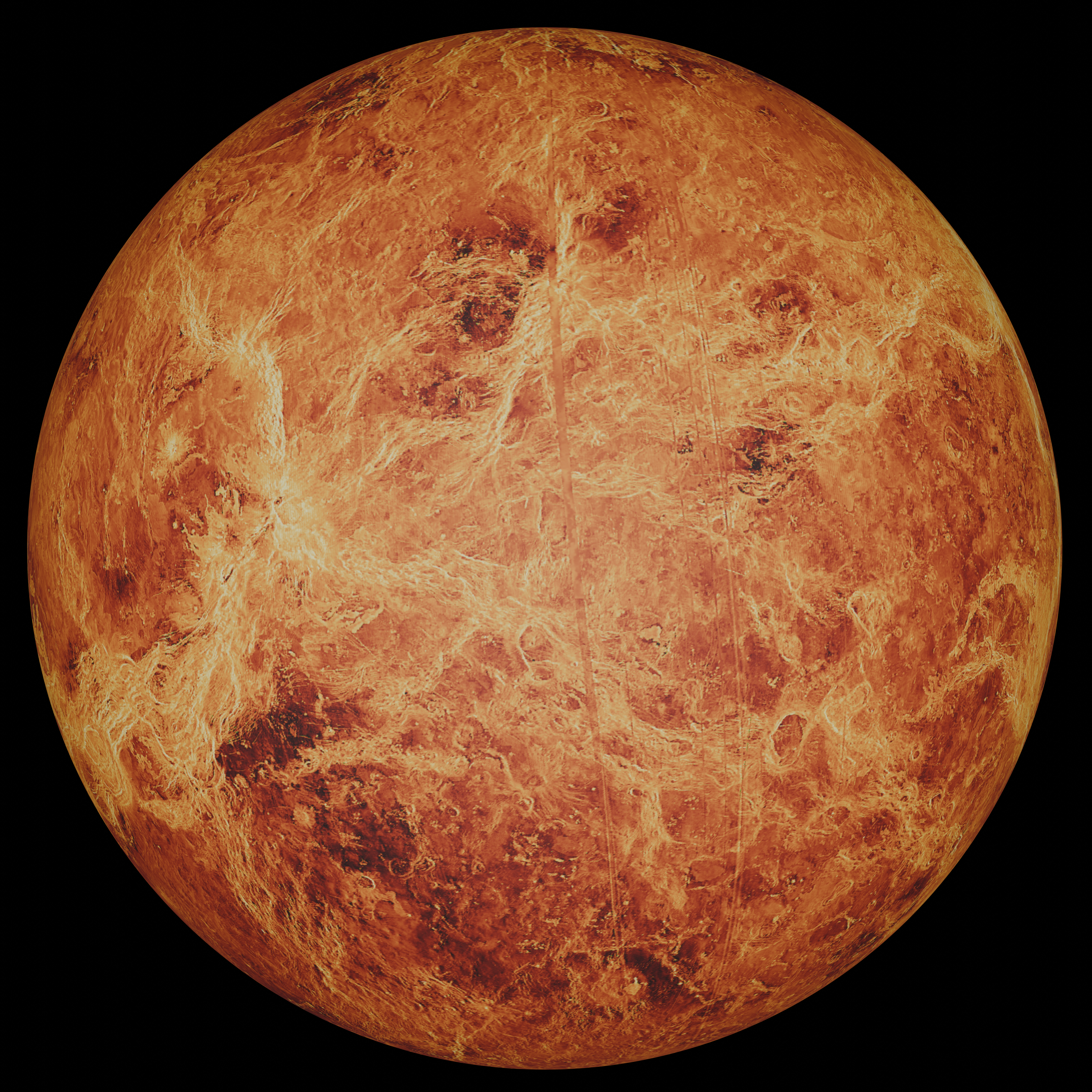
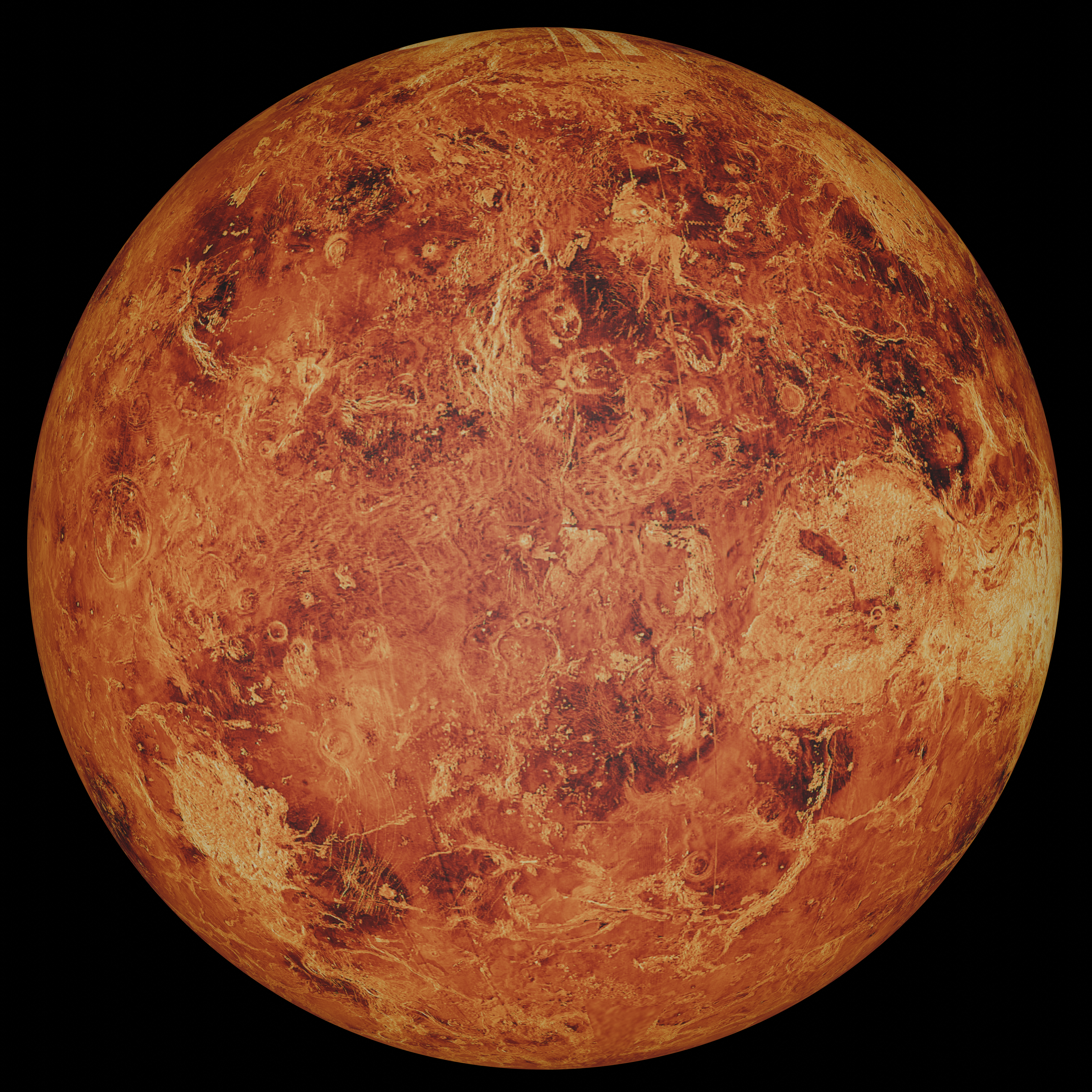
Surface rendered with Blender with base color map and heightmap data from NASA and the USGS.

The surface of Venus is dominated by geologic features that include volcanoes, large impact craters, and aeolian erosion and sedimentation landforms. Venus has a topography reflecting its single, strong crustal plate, with a unimodal elevation distribution (over 90% of the surface lies within an elevation of -1.0 and 2.5 km) that preserves geologic structures for long periods of time. Studies of the Venusian surface are based on imaging, radar, and altimetry data collected from several exploratory space probes, particularly Magellan, since 1961 (see Venus Exploration). Despite its similarities to Earth in size, mass, density, and possibly composition, Venus has a unique geology that is unlike Earth's. Although much older than Earth's, the surface of Venus is relatively young compared to other terrestrial planets (<500 million years old), possibly due to a global-scale resurfacing event that buried much of the previous rock record. Venus is believed to have approximately the same bulk elemental composition as Earth, due to the physical similarities, but the exact composition is unknown. The surface conditions on Venus are more extreme than on Earth, with temperatures ranging from 453 to 473 °C and pressures of 95 bar. Venus lacks water, which makes crustal rock stronger and helps preserve surface features. The features observed provide evidence for the geological processes at work. Twenty feature types have been categorized thus far. These classes include local features, such as craters, coronae, and undae, as well as regional-scale features, such as planitiae, plana, and tesserae.

== Plains ==
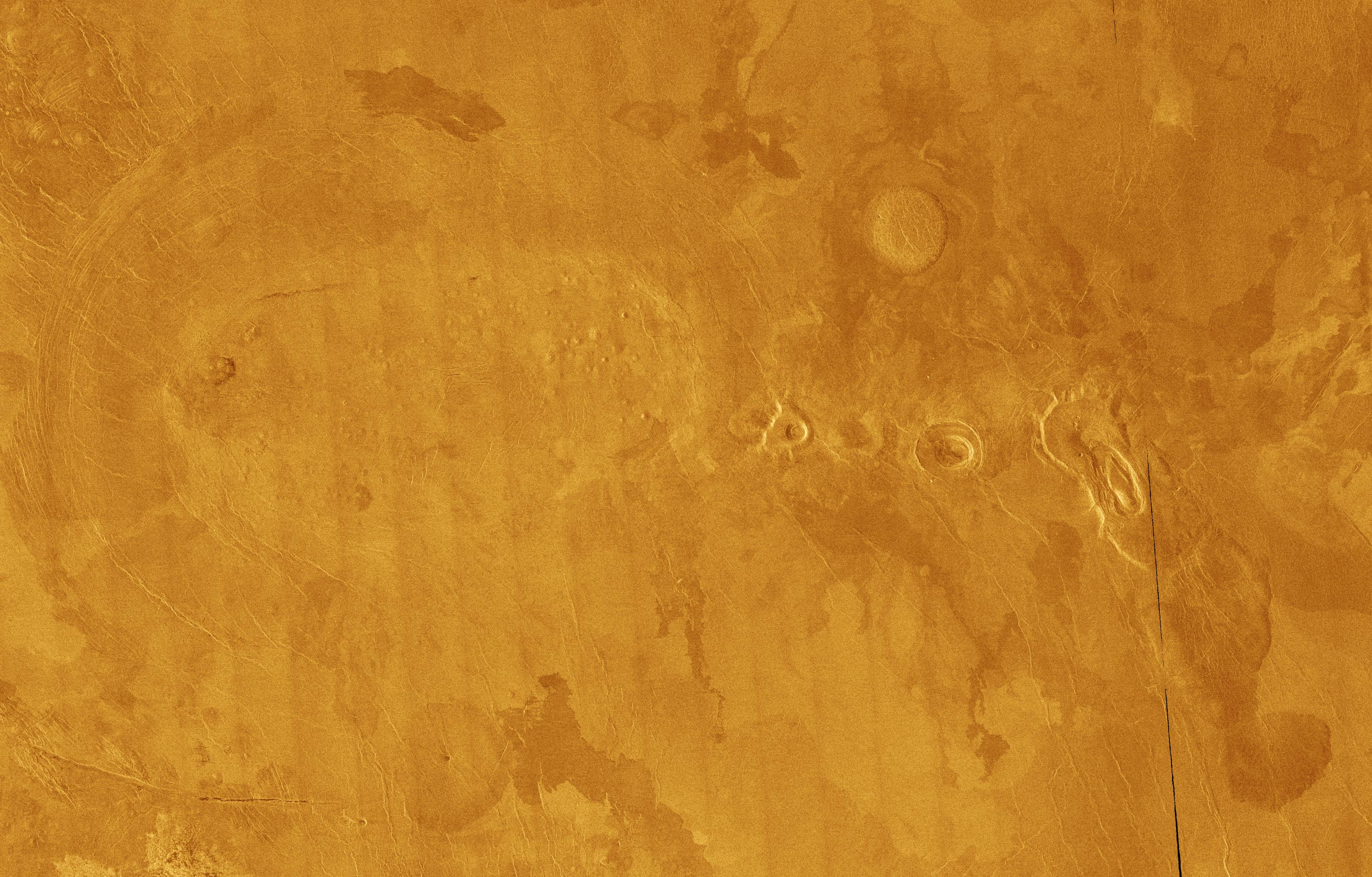
False-color image of a plains region on Venus. The small bumps on the left side of the image are volcanoes in a "shield field."

Plains are large areas of relatively flat topography on Venus that form at varying elevations. Plains with elevations within 1–3 km of the datum are referred to as lowland plains, or planitiae, and those above are named highland plains, or plana. Plains cover 80% of the Venusian surface, and, unlike those seen on other silicate planets, are heavily faulted or fractured throughout. Structurally, these plains contain features such as wrinkle ridges, grabens (fossa and linea), fractures, scarps (rupes), troughs, hills (collis), and dikes in both local and region scales. Plains often contain visible flow patterns, indicating a source from volcanic lava flows. The more pronounced lava flow fields are named fluctūs. The presence of surface flow patterns, in conjunction with crosscutting valleys, has given rise to the hypothesis that these plains likely formed by global lava flows over a short timescale and were subsequently exposed to compressional and extensional stresses. Structurally, plains are often deformed in belts of ridges (dorsa) or fractures (lineae) of various orientation and morphology.

== Channels/valles ==
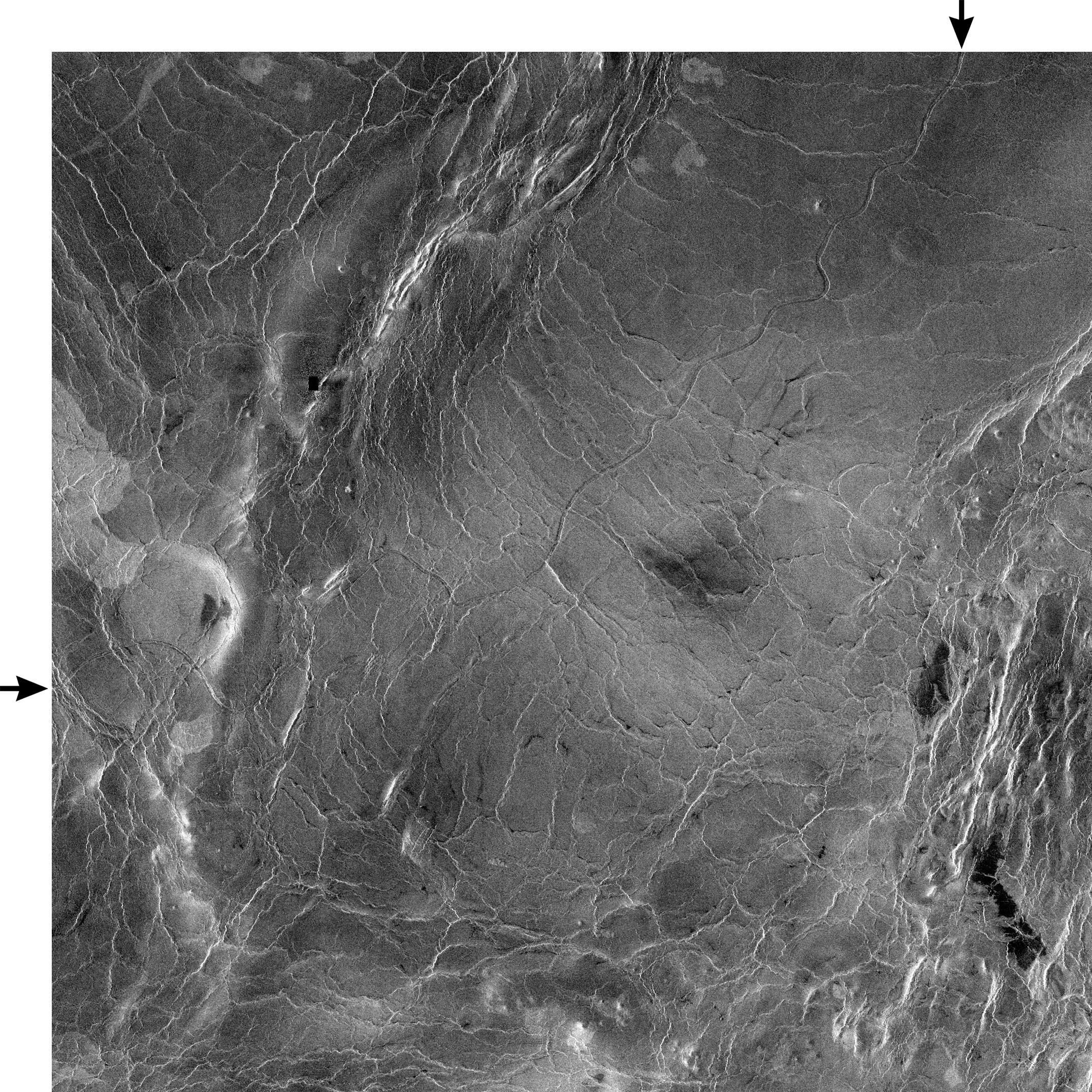
Radar mosaic from Magellan showing a 600-km-long segment of Baltis Vallis, a channel on Venus that is longer than the Nile

The surface of Venus contains over 200 channel systems and named valles which resemble terrestrial rivers. These channels vary in length and width and are commonly found in planar regions of the planet. Channel length and width ranges from the minimum resolution of Magellan imaging to over 6800 km long (Baltis Vallis) and up to 30 km wide. Their global distribution is not uniform, and tend to concentrate around the equatorial region, near volcanic structures. Venusian valles also show characteristics of flows, such as levees on the margins and downstream narrowing and shallowing. Channels also do not contain tributaries, despite their large scale. However, because of the high surface temperature of Venus, liquid water is unstable, making their comparison with terrestrial rivers difficult. These features are similar to lava flows on other terrestrial planets, which has led to the conclusion that these valleys likely formed from volcanic flows. This is also suggested by the evidence of cooled lava flows filling the valles. Channels likely formed in very short timescales (1–100 years), indicating very fast movement and erosion of lavas. Venusian channels are classified by morphology and include three types: simple, complex, and compound.

- Simple channels are single channel valleys with little to no branching or anastomosing. Types of simple channels observed on Venus include sinuous rilles, simple channels with flow margins, and canali. Sinuous rilles are like those seen on the Moon; narrow erosive channels that originate from regions of volcanic collapse, such as coronae. Simple channels with flow margin are located in obvious flow fields, have an undefined source and end, and are believed to feed into large flows from surrounding volcanics. Canali, like the Baltis Vallis, are long flows with constant width and depth that may contain abandoned channels, bends, and levees, indicating they are sourced from large amounts of thick lavas.
- Complex channels are channels that can be braided, anastomosing, or in distributary patterns. They commonly form on lava flow deposits, but also occur elsewhere. Complex channels without flow margins may form part of a larger flow system, and form as channels of lava flows erode into the crust. Complex channels with flow margins appear as non-erosional, and their individual channels are separated by islands of crust of differing radar qualities.
- Compound channels show simple and complex channel structures. These channels usually begin as simple channels and bifurcate and meander as flow energy decreases on its distal reaches.

== Volcanism ==
=== Volcanic centers ===
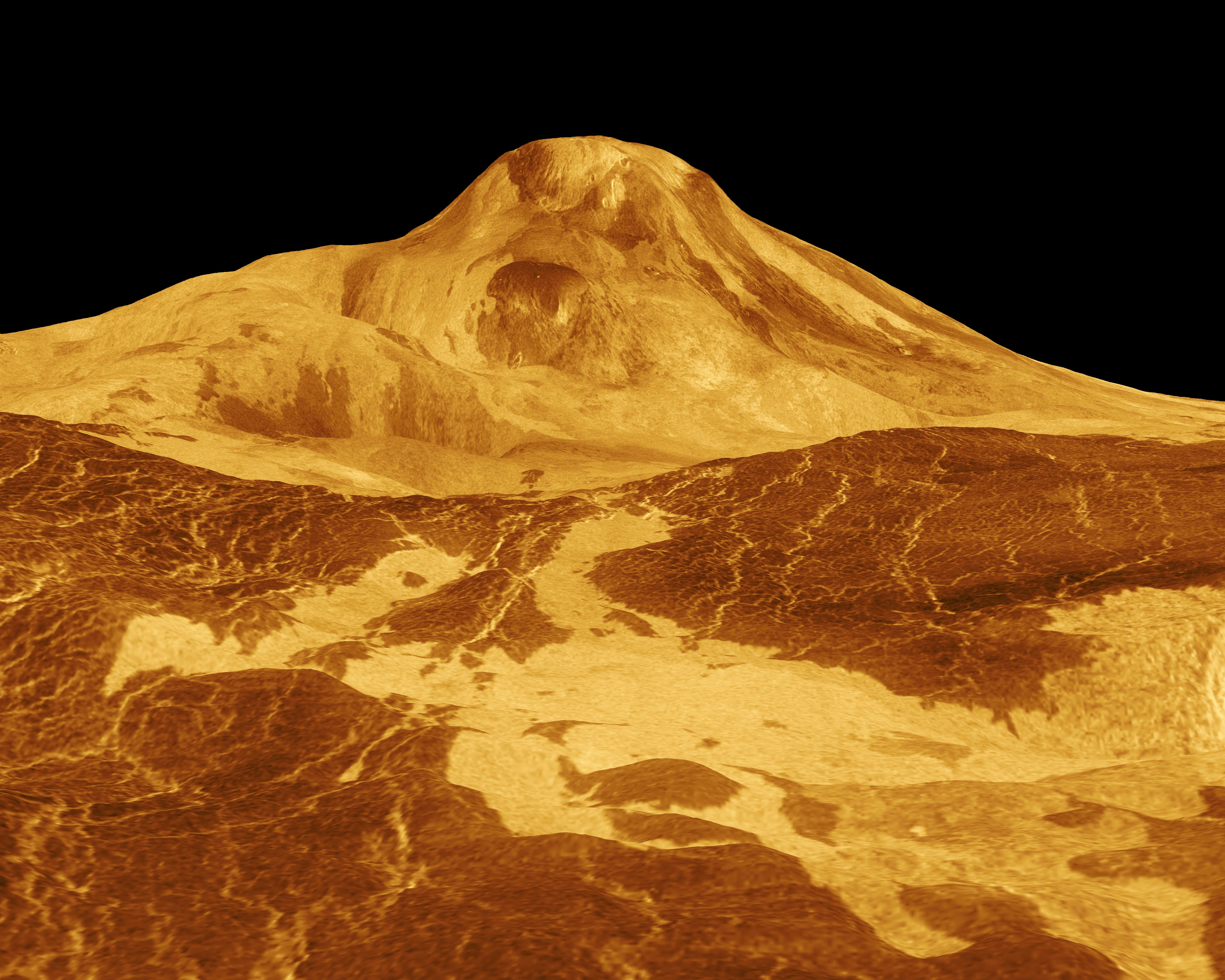
Maat Mons with a vertical exaggeration of 22.5. Maat Mons is the second-highest mountain on Venus, and is a recently active shield volcano.

Over 1,100 volcanic structures over 20 km in diameter have been identified on Venus, and it is assumed that smaller structures probably number many times these. These structures include large volcanic edifices, shield volcano fields, and individual calderas. Each of these structures represents a center of extrusive magma eruption and differences in amount of magma released, depth of the magma chamber, and rate of magma replenishment effect volcano morphology. When compared to Earth, the number of preserved volcanic zones is staggering, and this is based on Venus' strong crust due to a lack of water. Volcanic centers on Venus are not distributed evenly, as over half of the centers are found in and around the Beta-Atla-Themis region, which covers <30% of the planet's surface. These tend to occur in mid to upper altitudes, where rifting and extension are common, and they signal mantle upwellings to the surface. Volcanic centers on Venus are characterized in two main categories based on the ability or inability to create a shallow magma reservoir: Large flows originating from a single edifice or extensive regions with many small eruption sites clustered together.

- Single volcanoes denote a single, large edifice. Volcanoes of this type include large volcanoes (>100 km in diameter, often named mons, examples: Theia Mons and Maat Mons), intermediate volcanoes (20–100 km in diameter), and calderas. These single-eruption-center volcanoes are sustained by a shallow magma chamber in the crust. The magma chamber is replenished by magma from mantle upwelling and decompression melting, causing pooling and trapping of a reservoir. The trapping of a magma chamber allows long-term eruption, and results in magma flows that may create large volcanic domes and flow deposits. The extrusion of magma to the surface is often linked to rifting or extensional tectonics in the region, and the shape of the dome or magma flow field is determined by the chemistry and viscosity of the magma. Each of these types of volcanoes can further be described based on the shape of the dome created, number of edifices present, presence of rifting along the dome, radial fracturing, or collapse of the magma chamber. Intermediate volcanoes with domical surface cones are named tholus, and pancake-shaped volcanoes are named farrum. Calderas are circular depressions on the surface believed to have formed by deformation above a cooling magma chamber. Calderas on Venus are characterized as simple, single depressions, called coronae, and complex, radially fractured zones, called arachnoids. Some caldera are named patera.
- Shield field are regions 100–200 km in diameter that contain many small, mostly shield, volcanoes (<20 km). Such fields may have tens to hundreds of shield volcanoes. Rarely, individual shield volcanoes will be named colles. These fields form in areas where the magma replenishment rate is too low to produce a magma reservoir in the crust, resulting in several small eruptions on a regional scale. The dominance of shield-type volcanoes in these regions has led to the name shield fields.

=== Coronae ===
Coronae are large, circular structures with concentric fractures around them that result from mantle upwelling followed by extensional collapse. Since many sequences of upwelling and collapse have been observed as structurally different coronae on Venus' surface, all coronae appear to share a sequence of heavy volcanism as a result of upwelling, topographic rise, tectonic deformation, subsidence due to gravitational collapse, and continued volcanism. Coronae on Venus differ in the location of topographic uplift, and have been characterized as such. Topographic uplift may occur in the depression, the rim, the outer rim, or a combination of these locations. A collapsing coronae coupled with extensional stressing may result in rifting, creating a chasmata region.

=== Large lava flow fields ===
Large lava flow fields are described as flood-type lava that can be seen in fluctus fields. These are regions flooded with many low-viscosity volcanic flows from a single source that covers the area in a continuous flow field. Some flows may be radially distributed around a volcano of coronae as an apron, be fan-shaped, or sub-parallel in their orientation. Large flow fields may be sourced from large volcanoes, calderas, rift structures, or shield volcano fields and they are often associated with extensional environments.

=== Topographic rises ===
Topographic rises are domal-shaped areas of high topography that result from both volcanic and tectonic processes. These areas range from 1–4 km above the datum and 1,000–3,000 km across. These rises are associated with high-density anomalies, which indicate a source from mantle plumes beneath the crust that warp and uplift the region. Of the topographic rises on Venus, three types have been identified based on their dominating tectonic or volcanic morphology: volcano dominated, rift dominated, and corona dominated. Volcano-dominated rises, such as the Bell Regio, have volcanoes atop the topographic rise. Rift-dominated rises are uplifted by rifting and thinning of the lithosphere and include the Beta Regio and the overlying Theia Mons. In a coronae-dominated rise, uplift is caused by the gravitational collapse and extension of a magma chamber, and include the Themis Regio.

== Tesserae ==
Tesserae are a feature unique to Venus and are characterized as continent-sized regions of high topography (1 to >5 km above the datum) that are heavily deformed, often with complex patterns of ridges. These areas are formed by the intersection of at least two structural components. Tesserae are classified based on their structural components. Types of Tesserae Examples include Ishtar Terra and Aphrodite Terra. Tesserae are considered to be the oldest surface features on Venus because of their extensive deformation, and may reflect conditions on Venus before a global resurfacing event. Some of the ridges found on tesserae terrains, particularly in Ishtar Terra, form large mountain (or mons) belts. Along the equatorial and southern latitudes, tesserae are labeled regiones, while those in northern latitudes are labeled tessera.

== Impact craters ==
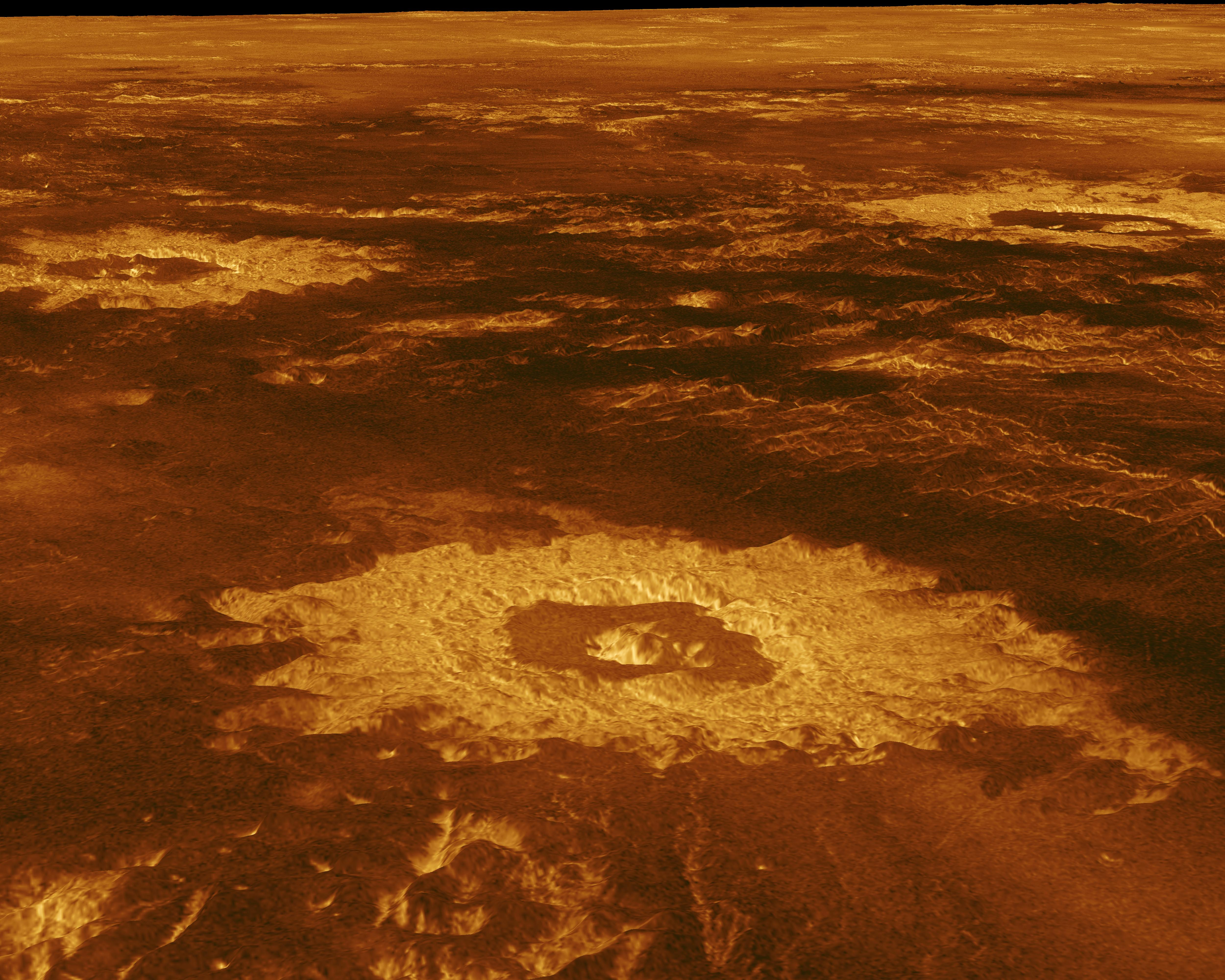
Impact craters on the surface of Venus (image reconstructed from radar data)

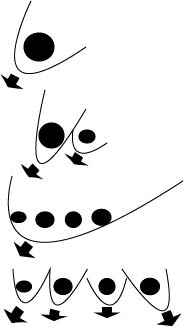
Mechanism for meteor breakup. As an object enters the atmosphere, it weakens due to frictional heating and can fracture into smaller pieces, creating linear arrangements of craters.

Impact craters are roughly circular shaped depressions in the surface of a planet due to high velocity impacts with extraterrestrial bodies. The surface of Venus contains almost 1000 impact craters. However, unlike some planets in our system, Venus' thick atmosphere creates a strong shield that decelerates, flattens, and can fracture incoming projectiles. The Venusian surface is devoid of small craters (≤30–50 km in size) because of the effect the atmosphere has on small bodies. Depending on the angle of impact, velocity, size, and strength of the approaching body, the atmosphere may tear and crush the projectile, essentially melting it in the air. This is an important observation for studies of the surface of Venus, as crater are used to determine relative ages and to approximate absolute ages of surface features.

Craters on Venus are kept in pristine condition, thus making their classification and impact mechanics easy to interpret. Small projectiles burn up in the atmosphere, and those that make it to the surface break into smaller pieces, creating clusters of impact craters similar in appearance to circular lunar craters. As crater size increases, the chance of breakup in the atmosphere decreases and the impact craters become more circular with central peaks from isostatic rebound of the crust. The atmosphere can flatten and slow larger meteoroids to terminal velocity and cause them to explode on impact or near the surface, showering the region in debris. The shockwave from these explosions can flatten the surrounding area for several kilometers. Large impacts create parabolic excavation cones and flows of lava-like debris.

== Aeolian structures ==
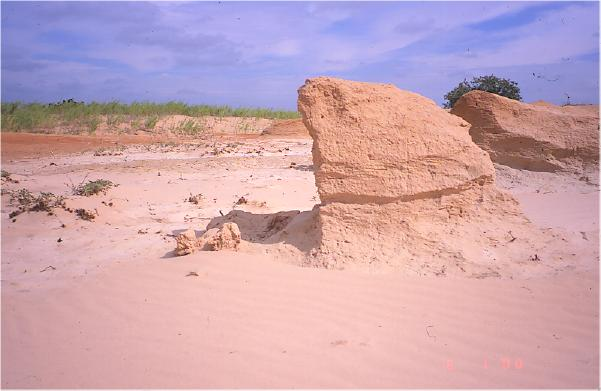
An example of a yardang near Meadow, Texas (USDA photo)

Recent Magellan images show over 6,000 aeolian landforms, including dunes (or undae), windstreaks, and yardangs. Undae and yardangs have direct analogues on Earth and the process that creates them here can be applied to those seen on Venus. Large dune fields have been identified on the surface and the dunes range in size from meters to hundreds of meters. Similarly, yardang fields may exist in locations such as Mead crater. Windstreaks are parallel linear streaks that form as prevailing winds erode the surface geology. These features illustrate the erosive effect the atmosphere has on the surface of Venus.

== See also ==
- Geology of Venus
- Planetary nomenclature
- List of geological features on Venus
- List of coronae on Venus
- List of craters on Venus
- List of extraterrestrial dune fields
- List of montes on Venus
- List of terrae on Venus
