= Darius Lakdawalla =

American health economist

- Born: 1973 (age 52–53)
- Spouse: Emily Lakdawalla
- Children: 2

Academic background
- Education: Amherst College; University of Chicago
- Thesis: The declining quality of teachers (2000)
- Doctoral advisor: Gary Becker

Academic work
- Institutions: NBER; RAND Corporation; University of Southern California

Darius Noshir Lakdawalla (born 1973) is an American health economist. He is the Quintiles Chair in Pharmaceutical Development and Regulatory Innovation at the School of Pharmacy at the Leonard D. Schaeffer Center for Health Policy and Economics at the University of Southern California and co-founder and Chief Scientific Officer of Precision Health Economics, a health care consulting firm. Lakdawalla also serves as the executive director of the "Innovation and Value Initiative" (IVI), a multi-stakeholder scientific initiative that aims to improve the way value is measured and rewarded in the healthcare marketplace.

Lakdawalla previously served as the founding Director of Research at the Schaeffer Center, as well as the founding Director of Research at the Bing Center for Health Economics at the RAND Corporation.

== Biography ==
Lakdawalla's family is of Parsis descent. His family settled in Los Angeles when he was a child. Lakdawalla attended Amherst College, where he graduated, summa cum laude, with a bachelor's degree in philosophy and mathematics. In 2000, Lakdawalla earned a Ph.D. in Economics from the University of Chicago in 2000. His PhD supervisor was Gary Becker.

== Research ==
Lakdawalla has research interests in the economics of risks to health and the organization of health care markets. Specifically, he has published papers that explore the reasons behind the declining use of nursing homes by the elderly, rising rates of obesity in America, acceleration in the rate of new HIV infections and the growth in disability among younger Americans. In addition, he has conducted research into the economic and social value of health, longevity, and healthcare.

Lakdawalla's work has been published in journals of economics, medicine, and health policy, and funded by the National Institute on Aging, the Eunice Kennedy Shriver National Institute of Child Health and Human Development, and the National Bureau of Economic Research. In 2003, he won the annual Milken Institute Award for Distinguished Economic Research. In 2009, he and his coauthors won the Eugene Garfield Economic Impact on Medical and Health Research Award.

Lakdawalla sits on the editorial boards of several academic journals including the Journal of Health Economics, the American Journal of Health Economics, and the Review of Economics and Statistics and is a member of the American Economic Association, the American Society of Health Economists, and the International Health Economics Association. He is a research associate at the National Bureau of Economic Research and has received press mentions in The New York Times, The Wall Street Journal, and The Economist

== Bibliography ==
=== Books and chapters ===
- Goldman, Dana; Lakdawalla, Darius (2011), "Intellectual Property, Information Technology, Biomedical Research, and Marketing of Patented Products", Handbook of Health Economics, vol. 2, Elsevier, pp. 825–872, doi:10.1016/B978-0-444-53592-4.00013-X, ISBN 978-0-444-53592-4
- Lakdawalla, Darius N.; Sood, Neeraj (2012), "Incentives to Innovate", The Oxford Handbook of the Economics of the Biopharmaceutical Industry, Oxford University Press, pp. 143–166, doi:10.1093/oxfordhb/9780199742998.013.0006, ISBN 978-0-19-974299-8
- Huckfeldt, Peter J.; Lakdawalla, Darius N.; Philipson, Tomas J. (2012), "Economics of Obesity", The Elgar Companion to Health Economics (2nd ed.), Edward Elgar Publishing, doi:10.4337/9780857938138.00016, ISBN 978-0-85793-813-8
- Phelps, Charles E.; Lakdawalla, Darius (2024). Valuing health: the generalized and risk-adjusted cost-effectiveness (GRACE) model. New York, NY: Oxford University Press. ISBN 978-0-19-768632-4.

=== Selected articles ===
- Darius N. Lakdawalla (2012). "How Cancer Patients Value Hope And The Implications For Cost-Effectiveness Assessments Of High-Cost Cancer Therapies". Health Affairs. 31 (4): 676–682. doi:10.1377/hlthaff.2011.1300. PMID 22492883.
- Lakdawalla, Darius; Sood, Neeraj; Goldman, Dana (2006). "HIV Breakthroughs and Risky Sexual Behavior*". Quarterly Journal of Economics. 121 (3): 1063–1102. doi:10.1162/qjec.121.3.1063. ISSN 0033-5533.
- Lakdawalla, Darius N.; Sun, Eric C.; Jena, Anupam B.; Reyes, Carolina M.; Goldman, Dana P.; Philipson, Tomas J. (2010). "An economic evaluation of the war on cancer". Journal of Health Economics. 29 (3): 333–346. doi:10.1016/j.jhealeco.2010.02.006.
- Lakdawalla, Darius; Zanjani, George (2012). "Catastrophe Bonds, Reinsurance, and the Optimal Collateralization of Risk-Transfer" (PDF). Journal of Risk and Insurance. 79 (2): 449–476. doi:10.1111/j.1539-6975.2011.01425.x. S2CID 9786469.
