= I'm a Scientist, Get me out of here! =

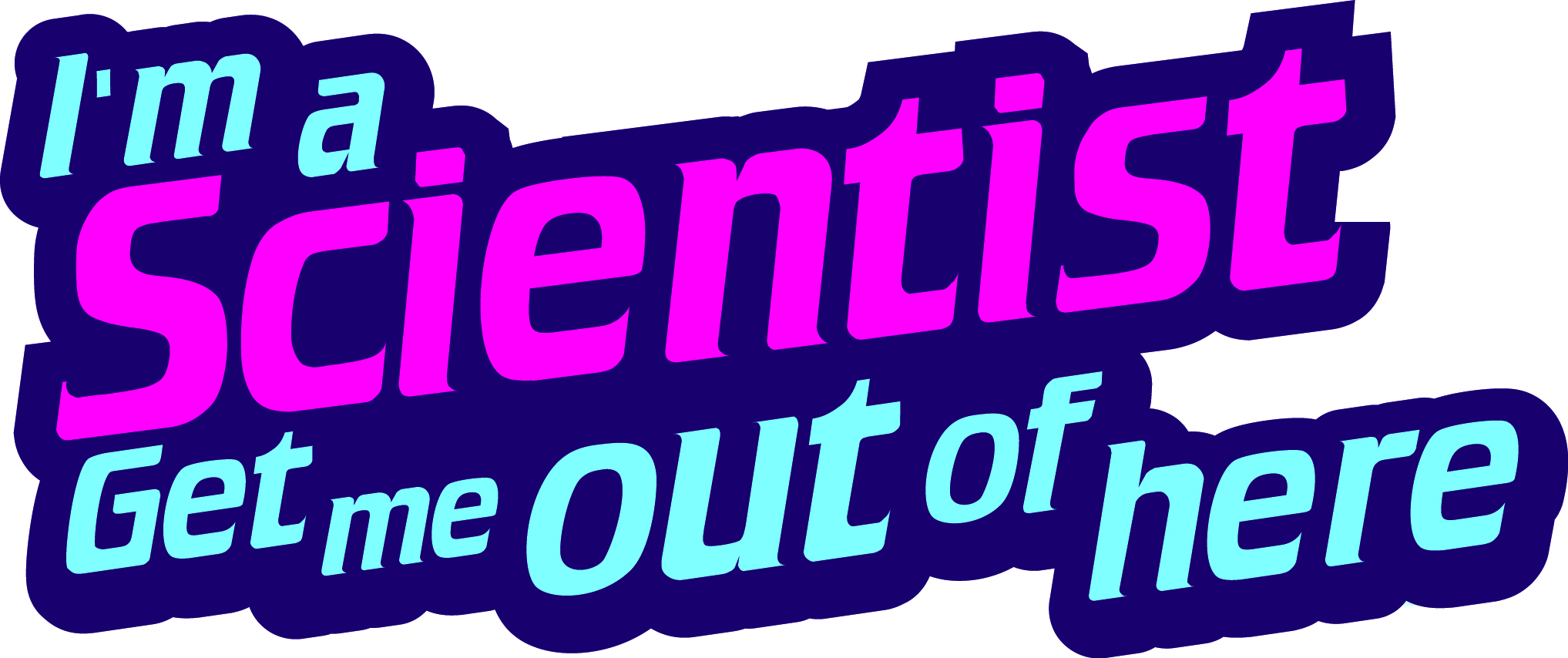
- Logo for series
- Sponsored by: Wellcome Trust
- Date: 2010
- Location: Online
- Country: United Kingdom
- Reward: £500
- Website: imascientist.org.uk imanengineer.org.uk

I'm a Scientist, Get me out of here! is an online science enrichment activity that runs throughout term-time in the UK. School students interact with scientists in text-based live chats in themed 'Zones'. At the end of the event the school students vote for their favourite scientist and the winner is awarded prize money to support further science communication.

== Background ==
Pilots for I'm a Scientist, Get me out of here began in 2008, and were well received by school students and teachers. It was founded by Shane McCracken of Gallomanor Communications. The activity is divided into several zones, which focus on either general science or a specific industry. The funding for each zone is provided by an associated learned society, organisation or industry. Prior to 2020, the competition format was similar to The X Factor, and school students vote for the winner based on answers they receive to their questions submitted online and in live, text-based chats with the scientists. During the COVID-19 pandemic, I'm a Scientist became an 'on demand' activity with Zones lasting longer, and scientists staying until the end of each Zone. Participating scientists are given an opportunity to develop their communication skills whilst school students and teachers benefit from contact time with a real-life, practising scientist. The competition is also run for engineers, geoscientists, medics and astronauts, and many more.

The activity takes place annually in the UK, Ireland and Spain. It has also run in previous years in the United States, Malaysia, Kenya, Vietnam, Germany and Australia.

== Winners ==
=== I'm a Scientist (UK) ===
==== Winners 2010 – 2014 ====
2010	2011	2012	2013	2014
Martin Coath	Mark Hill	Andy Hearn	Jen Todd Jones	Zach Dixon
Kiran Meekings	Murray Collins	Matt Maddock	Phil Wilkinson	Rosie Coates
Katy Milne	Julian Rayner	Robin Stafford Allen	Jack Heal	Lewis Dean
Joseph Devlin	Adam Tuff	James Vokes	Duncan Gaskin	Aled Roberts
Kerstin Zechner	Jamie Pringle	Chris Hill	Leila Nichol	Matthew Malek
Sally Fenton	James Chan	Paige Brown	Grant Kennedy	Clara Nellist
Ben Still	David Pyle	Adam Stevens	Hayley Evers-King	Amar Joshi
Dean Whitaker	Suzi Gage	Martin Austwick	Laura Soul	Roy Adkin
Joanna Brooks	Ceri Brenner	Fiona Hatch	James Holloway	Anna Middleton
Vicki Onions	Emily Robinson	Jack Snape	Tom Branson	Nick Wright
Stephen Curry	Andrew Rae	Katherine Haxton	Jennifer Paxton	John Foster
Andrew Maynard	Anna Williams	Vicky Young	Jonathan Stone	Isabel Webb
Mark Roberts	Paddy Brock	Sam Vinko	Gary Boorman	Jennifer Stephens
Panos Soultanas	Jim Caryl	Sean Murphy	Suzanne Harvey	James Bell
Katy Mee	Carys Cook	Joanna Cruden	Andrew Swale	Roberto Trotta
Tom Hardy	Zara Gladman	Kirsty Ross	Dave Briggs	Sam Connolly
Jon Copley	Barbara Guinn	Ashley Cadby	Lyn Lim	Sergey Lamzin
Ian Sillett	Cat O'Connor	Bob Bonwick	Simon Holyoake	Daren Fearon
Joseph Cook	Helen O'Connor	Allan Pang	Rhodri Jenkins	Daryl Jones
Steven Kiddle	Amy Reeve	Carol White	Sam Geen	Dave Jones
Joanna Buckley	Wei Xun	Tom Lister	Keith Siew	Ditte Hedegaard
Ceri Thomas	Gemma Sharp	Nuala Carson	Alan Richardson	Peter Elliott
Deuan Jones	Dave Sproson	Michael Cook	Stuart Archer	Loren MacDonald
Hywel Vaughan	Sam Tazzyman	Anouk Gouvras	Dave Farmer	Andrew French
Joanna Watson	Evan Keane	John Short	Chris Whittle	Jemma Rowlandson
	Rika Nair	Nicola Ibberson	Sarah-Jane Walsh	Ekbal Hussain
	Suze Kundu	Sarah Martin	Becky Cook	Rebecca Williams
	Tom Crick	Samantha Weaver	Jess Bean	Naomi Osborne
	Ian van der Linde	Lizzie Eaves	Hannah Brotherton	Fiona McLean
	Jennifer Gupta	Alison Atkin	Becki Scott	David Davila
	Peta Foster	Pete Etchells	Mario Ruiz	Matt Bilton
	Ben Still	Eileen Diskin	Sofia Franco	Stefan Lines
		Enda O'Connell	Sarah Tesh	Katie Pickering
		Paul Higgins	Vicky Forster	Angela Stokes
		Robert Insall	Simon Langley-Evans	Sarah Ashwood
		Joanna Giles	Kristian Harder	Lisa Simmons
		Callum Johnston	Matthew Tomlinson	Helen Johnson
			James Hickey	Matthew Camilleri
			Zach Dixon	Alexander Pool
			Rosie Coates	Arthur Dyer
			Lewis Dean	
			Aled Roberts	
			Matthew Malek	
			Clara Nellist	
			Amar Joshi	
			Roy Adkin	
			Anna Middleton	
			Nick Wright	
			John Foster	
			Isabel Webb	

==== Winners 2015 – 2019 ====
2015	2016	2017	2018	2019
Thomas Clements	Christopher Blanford	Carrie Ijichi	Neil Keddie	Lee Steinberg
Barbara Shih	Cat Scott	Sallie Baxendale	Stephanie Mann	Rosanna Tilbrook
Jo Sadler	Majid Ahmed	Daniel Fovergue	David Howard	Martin McCoustra
Carmen Denam	Emma Dean (Osbourne)	Craig O'Hare	Max Jamily	Sophia Pells
Hugh Harvey	Paul O'Mahoney	Hannah Sargeant	Tim Duckenfield	Matthew Smith
Elizabeth Cooper	Lauren Laing	James Gudgeon	Sophie Williams	Vassilis Sideropoulos
Glafkos Havariyoun	Scott Lawrie	Lewis Wright	Jacque Cilliers	James Munro
Peter Maskell	Lowri Evans	Alex Evans	Jennifer Paxton	Zoe Winshurst
Anais Pujol	Hayley Moulding	Sanjib Bhatka	Ali Hill	Lowri Evans
Ollie Brown	Jonathan Hunter	Liz Buckingham-Jeffery	Daniel Marsh	Oliver Gordon
Sam Ellis	Laura Finney	Jermaine Ravalier	Samuel Vennin	Alexander Allen
Philip Moriarty	Matt Dunn	Sam Carr	Sam Burton	Russell Arnott
James Pope	Joanna Bagniewska	Matt Lee	Daniel Jolley	Stuart Higgins
Frank Longford	Koi Wangwiwatsin	Dan Smith	Alex Seeney	Nick Werren
Imogen Napper	Angus Cook	Rosie Cane	Ella Mercer	Anastasia Aliferi
Jess Wade	Dawn Lau	Natasha Myhill	Abbie Jordan	Paul Laurance-Young
James Gilbert	Euan Allen	Ryan Cutter	Callum McHugh	Joanna Barstow
Sarah Beasley	Elliot Jokl	Ananthi Ramachandran	Danny Ward	Harry Wilkinson
Andy Scott	Joe Bathelt	Georgina Hazell	David Ho	Pizza Chow
Laura Wales	Steve Street	Duncan McNicholl	Alex Reid	Jolel Miah
Richard Prince	Megan Seymour	Oli Wilson	Rachel Sharman	Elena Maters
Thomas Farrugia	Lauren Burt	Senga Roberston-Albertyn	Liam Taylor	Bruno Silvester Lopes
Chris Armstrong	Zarah Pattison		Graeme Poole	Mark Johnson
Jonny Brooks-Bartlett	Darren Rhodes		Kelly Rushton	Jack Joyce
Ryan Cheale	Miranda Bane		Iain Stainland	Alex Batchelor
Hayley Clissold	Reka Nagy			Varun Ramaswamy
Sara Falcone	Laura-Anne Furlong			
Jesus Calvo-Castro				
Jack Carlyle				
Cristina Villa Del Campo				
Ashley Hughes				
Ross King				
Nicholas Pearce				
Natalie Garrett				

==== Winners 2020 – 2026 ====
2020	2021	2022	2023	2024	2025	2026
Greg Heikel	Martin McCoustra	Gareth Nye	George Foden	Fraser Smith	Jack Hughes	Mehul Jesani
Priya Silverstein	Felicity Hunter	Reece Bush-Evans	Martin McCoustra	Courtney Povey	Min Yap	Erin Pallott
Catherine Talbot	Amelia Gilio	Victoria Fawcett	Yannick Verbelen	Ryan Durnall	Oleg Kozhura	Ben Cheung
Binuraj Menon	Dennis Relojo-Howell	Mark Ridgill	Benjamin Foster	Sam Rogerson	Emily Walls	Chloe Gruyer
Dave Constable	Kip Heath	Jake Sallaway-Costello	Ilma Qonaah	Grace Callaghan	Paul Trusty	
Douglas Bray	Emma Yhnell	Ben Futcher	Birsu Kandemirci	Michael C Macey		
Ben Cropper	John Shaw	Dan Day	Santosh Mahabala			
Ross Alexander	Yueng Lenn	Liz Halstead	Chloe Tasker			
Stacey New	Michael Hills	Charli Corcoran	Giampiero Valenzano			
Danica Pinto	Jennifer Allen		John Grasmeder			
Baptiste Ravina	Alex Baxendale		Bruno Silvester Lopes			
Mick Schubert	Rafael Galupa		Octavia Brayley			
Edward Banks	Karen Fung		Jonathan Teague			
David Sobral	Luke Townsend		Michael Schubert			
Shanmugapriyan M.			David McGonigle			
Eliza Hunt						
Amy Rattenbury						
Amelia Gilio						
Parise Carmichael-Murphy						
Zsolt Keszthelyi						
Melanie Swang						
Kirsty Lindsay						

=== I'm in Space (UK) ===
Winners 2022 -

2022
Ben Dryer

=== I'm an Engineer (UK) ===
==== Winners 2012 – 2016 ====
2012	2013	2014	2015	2016
Andy Hearn	Gary Boorman	Jessica Marshall Housden	Neil Taylor	Ross Miller
Matt Maddock		Graham Wiggins	Felicity Harer	Ryan Bakewell
Robin Stafford Allen		Mark Greaves	Stacey Cutten	Stuart Inglis
James Vokes		Zoe George	Mohamed Salah	Matt Round
Chris Hill		Alex Lyness	Naomi Green	Andrew Pidgeon
Paige Brown			Norbert Gogiel	Chris Hackett
Nicola Lazenby			Lizzie Kapasa	Mark Gowan
			Lee Margetts	Laura O'Shea
			Zack Gill	Matt Hobbs
			Will Scott-Jackson	Eloise Taysom
			Rhys Archer	Richard Symonds
			Stevie Wray	James Clarke
			Michael Sulu	Leon Wechie
				Will Avison

==== Winners 2017 – 2021 ====
2017	2018	2019	2020	2021
Ana Gallego	Demi Ademuyewo	Leah Morgan	Yannick Verbelen	Michael Jones
Ollie Morris	Hollie Heard	Brian Weaver		Hester Baird
Emma Ryan	Guy Rixon	Shruti Turner		Chloe James
Stacey Marple	Eimear Tuohy	Chris Parmenter		Harriet Gamble
Gina Schade	Graham Cullen			Jessica Korzeniowska
Petros Papapanagiotou	Fiona Freeman			Femi Olushola
Sean Doherty	Boris Mocialov			
Lauren Ashmore	Andrew Margetts-Kelly			
	K'Jo O'Flynn			
	Henry Watts			

Winners 2022 - 2025

2022	2025
Paul James	Tom Louth

=== I'm a Medic (UK) ===
2017	2018	2019	2021	2022	2023
Shehla Imtiaz-Umer	Jamie Hynes	Neel Halder	Team Nottinghamshire Alliance Training Hub (NATH)	Team Midland RCGP	Nottinghamshire Alliance Training Hub
Robert Cullum		Tarik Shembesh			

=== I'm a Scientist (Ireland) ===
==== Winners 2012 – 2016 ====
2012	2013	2014	2015	2016
Eileen Diskin	Shane McGuinness	Chloe Kinsella	Sinead Balgobin	Stephen Davitt
Enda O'Connell	Sive Finlay	James Sullivan	Emma Feeney	Sebastian Gornik
Paul Higgins	Sinead Cullen	Shikha Sharma	Claire O'Connell	Aoife Lucid
	Joseph Roche	Ciaran O'Brien	Uday Bangavadi	Dave Concannon
				Mark Kennedy

==== Winners 2017 – 2021 ====
2017	2018	2019	2020	2021
Shannon Fullbrook	Jasmine Headlam	Aoife Campbell	Marcello Valente	Gaël Lymer
Emma Hanley	Fiana Ní Ghrálaigh	Jessica Franklin		Min Yap
Ciara O'Donovan	Hugh Manning	Katie Starsmore		
Sarah Guerin	Sheila Castilho	Souvik Kundu		
	Sonia Lenehan	Jake Cunningham		

Winners 2022 - 2024

2022	2024
Vincent Monchal	James Brown

=== I'm an Engineer (Ireland) ===
Winners 2014 – 2017

2014	2015	2016	2017
Laura Tobin	Padraic Morrissey	Conor McGinn	David Nolan
David Taylor	Martin O'Halloran	Ned Dywer	James Harpur
			Cathal Ó Murchú

==== Winners 2018 – 2022 ====
2018	2019	2020	2021	2022
Fiona Freeman	Kevin O'Brien	Ollie Otter	Mike Hinchey	Aisling Lee
Eimear Tuohy	Diana Abrunhosa	Connor McGookin		
Graham Cullen	Stephen O'Connor	Fiona Malone		

=== I'm a Geoscientist (Europe) ===
- Anna Rabitti
- Andreas Rudersdorf

=== I'm a Mathematician (UK) ===
- Sarah Brown
- Amy Mason (2024/25)
- Jenny Power (2025/26)

=== I'm a Mathematician (Ireland) ===
- Daniel McAleese
- Badal Mondal (2024)

=== I'm a Scientist (USA) ===
- Amelia Grose
- Srishti Baid

=== I'm a Computer Scientist (UK) ===
- Henry Duke (2024/25)
