= 365 Days of Astronomy =

Astronomy podcast

- Genre: Astronomy
- Language: English

Cast and voices
- Hosted by: Various

Production
- Production: Astronomical Society of the Pacific
- Length: 5–10 minutes

Technical specifications
- Video format: HTML video
- Audio format: MP3

Publication
- No. of episodes: 250
- Original release: January 1, 2009

Reception
- Ratings: 4.4/5

Related
- Website: 365daysofastronomy.org

365 Days of Astronomy is an educational podcast, inspired by the International Year of Astronomy, published daily beginning in 2009. It is produced as a collaboration between Southern Illinois University Edwardsville and Astrosphere New Media Association. The individual episodes are written, recorded, and produced by people all around the world. The podcast had 3,000–10,000 listeners each day.

== History ==
In 2008, astronomer Pamela Gay initiated brainstorming via e-mail on possible "new media" programs for 2009, the International Year of Astronomy (IYA). The discussion included Michael Koppelman from Slacker Astronomy, Phil Plait of Bad Astronomy, and others involved in the IYA. Their ideas were distilled down into the 365 Days Of Astronomy podcast. The podcast was to publish one episode per day over the entire year of 2009 and was originally planned to only run for that year.

In 2009, 365 Days of Astronomy released an episode with Ray Bradbury as a guest. During the podcast he spoke about one of his books, The Martian Chronicles, and said "We didn't think we could do it, and we did it! It was quite amazing" referring to the crewed moon launches.

In 2013, the show evolved to add video. In 2015, it joined the UNESCO International Year of Light.

In 2017, 365 Days of Astronomy became a production of the Astronomical Society of the Pacific, when the CosmoQuest grant moved to the ASP and Pamela Gay became the Director of Technology and Citizen Science at the ASP.

== Production ==
The intention is for individuals, schools, companies, and other organizations to record 5 to 10 minutes of audio for each episode. Contributors sign up for a particular day or for up to twelve episodes: one per month. Contributors include both professional and amateur astronomers as well as other scientists, historians, and others with an interest in astronomy. In the first three years of the project, contributors from every continent except Antarctica submitted episodes. Each episode has a common intro and outro that ties it to the overall theme. Avivah Yamani, project manager through 2012, was based in southeast Asia and expressed desire to encourage more diverse participants.

The podcast's theme song, "Far", was written and recorded by George Hrab. A longer version of the song is available on his album Trebuchet, which was released in June 2010.

== Contributors ==
Contributors have included:

- Astronomy Cast
- Slacker Astronomy
- Awesome Astronomy
- Columbia University Astronomy
- Doug Ellison of Unmannedspaceflight.com
- Stuart Lowe of the Jodcast
- Ed Sunder of Flintstone Stargazing
- Tavi Greiner and Rob Keown of A Sky Full of Stars
- The Planetary Society's Planetary Radio

== Education and outreach ==
All of the episodes are archived and can be accessed at any time. The variety of astronomy-related topics and 5 to 10-minute run-time makes the podcast an excellent learning and outreach resource for various venues including star parties, classrooms, home-school, drive-time, or while working at the computer. Topics range from "Why Stargazing is Cool" to "Dark Matter and Dark Energy" to "Will the World End in 2012?".

== Parsec award ==
In 2009, the 365 Days of Astronomy won a Parsec Award for Best Infotainment Podcast. It was one of five finalists and 50 nominees for the award that year. The award was accepted by George Hrab at the 2009 Dragon*Con convention.
