= Katie Mack (astrophysicist) =

American theoretical cosmologist

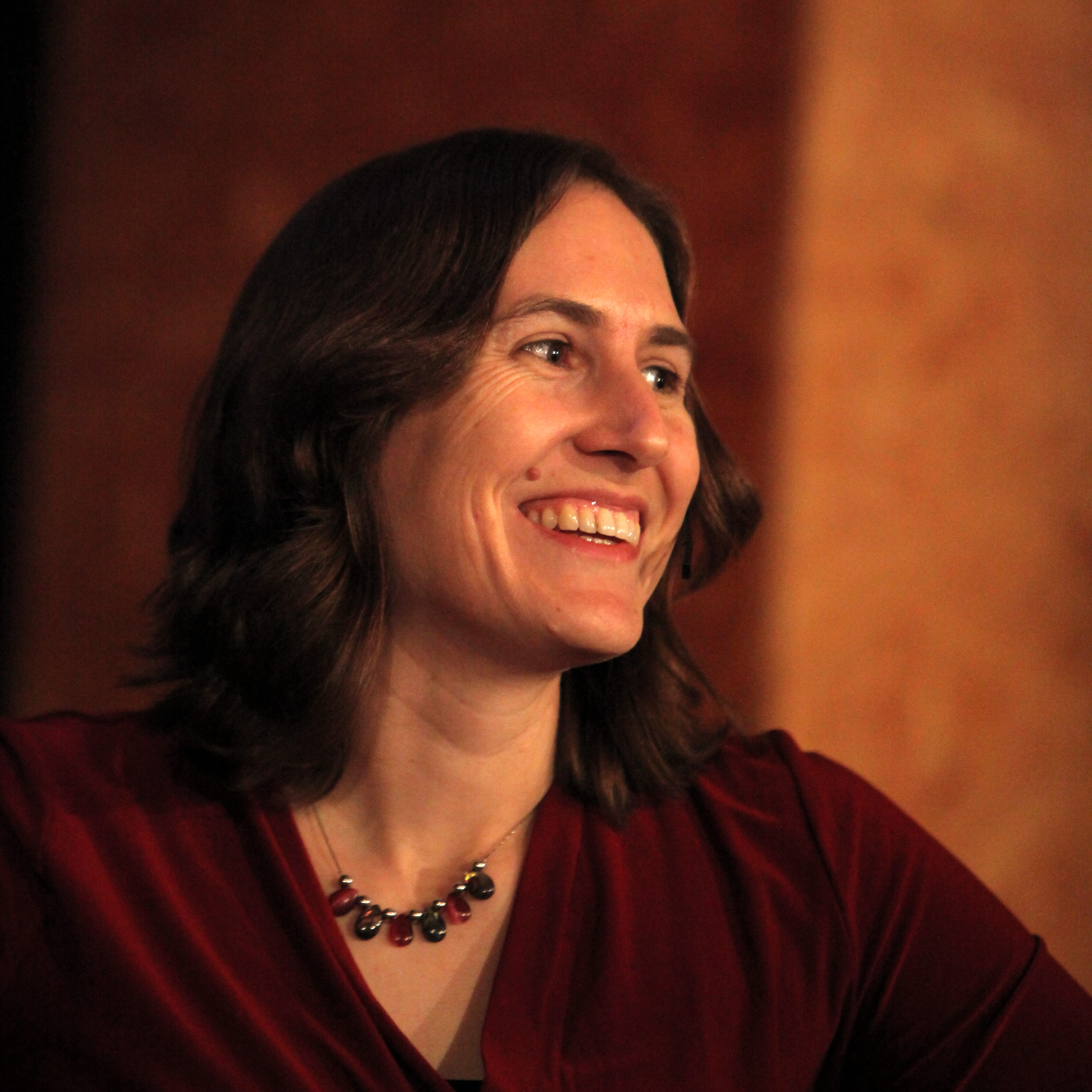
- Mack in 2019
- Born: Katherine J. Mack; 1 May 1981 (age 45)
- Education: Princeton University (PhD); California Institute of Technology (BS)
- Scientific career
- Fields: Cosmology; Theoretical astrophysics
- Workplaces: Perimeter Institute; North Carolina State University; University of Melbourne; University of Cambridge
- Thesis: Tests of Early Universe Physics from Observational Astronomy (2009)
- Doctoral advisor: Paul Steinhardt
- Katie Mack talking about cosmology Published October 2017
- Website: www.astrokatie.com

Katherine J. Mack (born 1 May 1981) is an American theoretical cosmologist who holds the Hawking Chair in Cosmology and Science Communication at the Perimeter Institute. Her academic research investigates dark matter, vacuum decay, and the Epoch of Reionization. Mack is also a popular science communicator who participates in social media and regularly writes for Scientific American, Slate, Sky & Telescope, Time, and Cosmos.

== Early life and education ==
External videos
- A Tour of the Universe: Women in Physics Lecture
- Shells of Cosmic Time

Mack became interested in science as a child and built solar-powered cars out of Lego blocks. Her mother is a fan of science fiction, and encouraged Mack to watch Star Trek and Star Wars. Her grandfather was a student at Caltech and worked on the Apollo 11 mission. She became more interested in spacetime and the Big Bang after attending talks by scientists such as Stephen Hawking.

Mack attended California Institute of Technology, and appeared as an extra in the opening credits of the 2001 American comedy film Legally Blonde when they filmed on campus. She received her undergraduate degree in physics in 2003. Mack obtained her PhD in astrophysics from Princeton University in 2009. Her thesis on the early universe was supervised by Paul Steinhardt.

== Research and career ==
After earning her doctorate, Mack joined the University of Cambridge as a Science and Technology Facilities Council (STFC) postdoctoral research fellow at the Kavli Institute for Cosmology. Later in 2012, Mack was a Discovery Early Career Researcher Award (DECRA) Fellow at the University of Melbourne. Mack was involved with the construction of the dark matter detector SABRE.

In January 2018, Mack became an assistant professor in the Department of Physics at North Carolina State University and a member of the university's Leadership in Public Science Cluster. She joined the Perimeter Institute for Theoretical Physics in June 2022 as the inaugural Hawking Chair in Cosmology and Science Communication. The Canadian multidisciplinary research organization CIFAR named her one of the CIFAR Azrieli Global Scholars in 2022.

Mack works at the intersection between fundamental physics and astrophysics. Her research considers dark matter, vacuum decay, the formation of galaxies, observable tracers of cosmic evolution, and the Epoch of Reionization. Mack has described dark matter as "one of science's most pressing enigmas". She has worked on dark matter self-annihilation and whether the accretion of dark matter could result in the growth of primordial black holes (PBHs). She has worked on the impact of PBHs on the cosmic microwave background. She has become increasingly interested, too, in the end of the universe.

=== Public engagement and advocacy ===
Mack maintains a strong science outreach presence on both social and traditional media. In this wise she has been described by Motherboard and Creative Cultivate as a "social media celebrity". Mack is a popular science writer and has contributed to The Guardian, Scientific American, Slate, The Conversation, Sky & Telescope, Gizmodo, Time, and Cosmos, as well as providing expert information to the BBC. Mack's Twitter account has over 300,000 followers; her response to a climate change denier on that platform gained mainstream coverage, as did her "Chirp for LIGO" upon the first detection of gravitational waves. She was the 2017 Australian Institute of Physics Women in Physics lecturer, in which capacity she spent three weeks delivering talks at schools and universities across Australia.

In 2018, Mack was chosen to be one of the judges for Nature magazine's newly founded Nature Research Awards for Inspiring Science and Innovating Science. In February 2019, she appeared in an episode of The Jodcast, talking about her work and science communication. Mack was a member of the jury for the Alfred P. Sloan Prize in the 2019 Sundance Film Festival and writes for Sloan Science & Film about science fiction. In 2019, she was referenced on the Hozier track "No Plan" from his album Wasteland, Baby!: "As Mack explained, there will be darkness again".

Her first book, The End of Everything (Astrophysically Speaking), was published by Simon & Schuster in August 2020, the firm having won the rights in an eight-way bidding battle. It considers the five scenarios for the end of the universe (both theoretically and practically), and has received positive reviews both for the accuracy of its science outreach and its wit. The book was also a New York Times Notable Book and featured on the best books of the year lists of The Washington Post, The Economist, New Scientist, Publishers Weekly, and The Guardian. Her second book, How To Build A Universe (Theoretically Speaking), delves into the scientific method; it shall be published March 9, 2027 by Simon & Schuster under their Scribner & Sons imprint. Its advance copy blurb is "Brilliant and thrilling!"

Mack hosted a podcast with author John Green called Crash Course Pods: The Universe in 2024.

== Personal life ==
Mack is interested in the intersection of art, poetry and science. She and the musician Hozier became friends after getting to know one another on Twitter. She is bisexual. Mack is also a pilot, having earned her private pilot license during the COVID-19 pandemic. She is now a Yellowbird pilot, flying the de Havilland Canada DHC-1 Chipmunk, and member of the board of directors at the Canadian Aviation Museum in Windsor, Ontario. Mack became vegetarian at seven years old, and is now vegan.
