= Suzi Gage =

British psychologist and epidemiologist

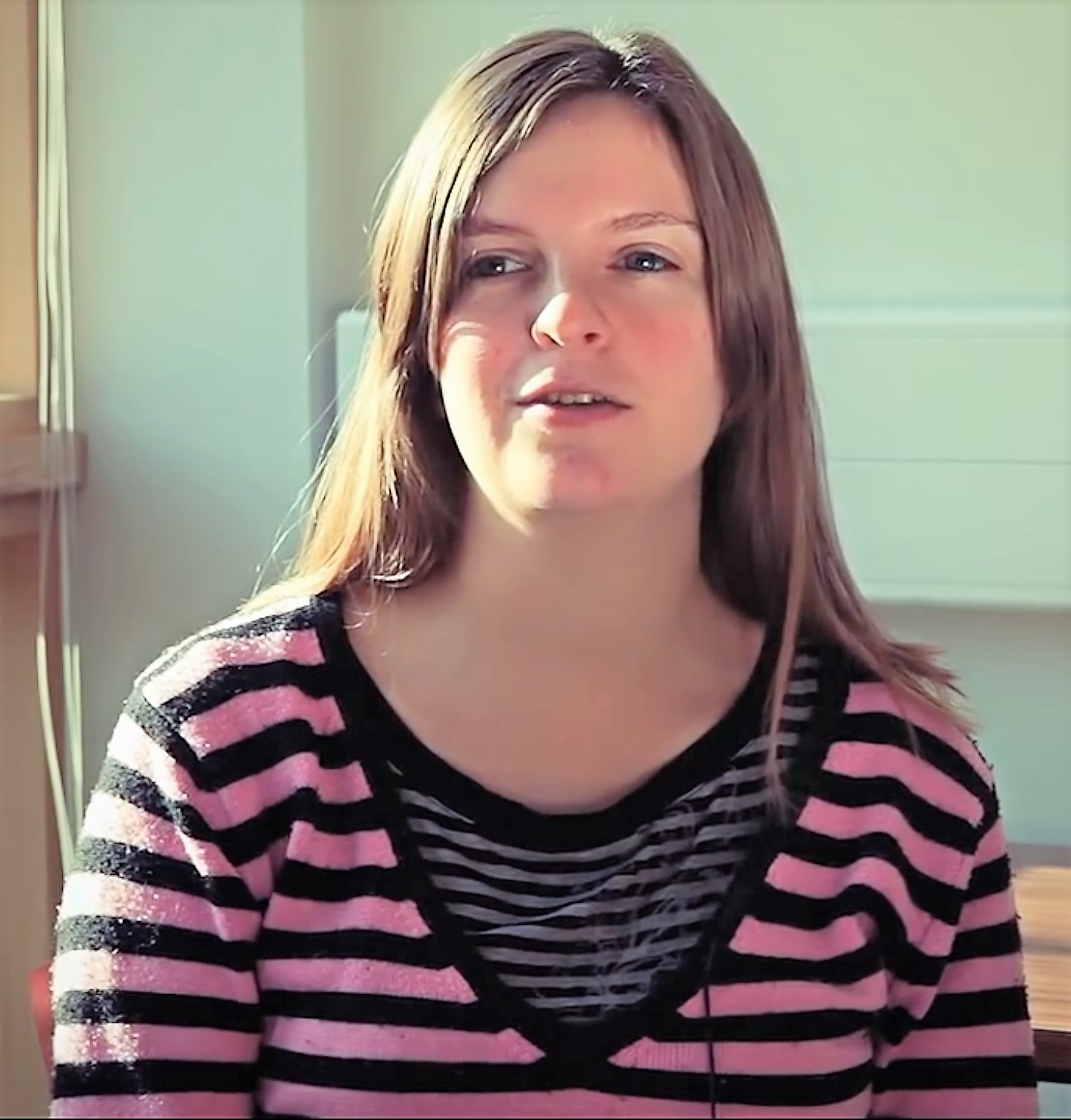
- Gage in 2012
- Born: Suzanne H. Gage
- Education: Dr Challoner's High School; University College London (BSc, MSc); University of Bristol (PhD)
- Known for: Science communication
- Awards: I'm a Scientist, Get me out of here! (2011)
- Scientific career
- Fields: Psychology; Public awareness of science
- Workplaces: University of Liverpool
- Thesis: Investigating associations of cannabis and cigarette use with mental health outcomes (2014)
- Website: suzigage.co.uk

Suzanne H. Gage is a British psychologist and epidemiologist who is interested in the nature of associations between lifestyle behaviours and mental health. She is a senior lecturer at the Liverpool John Moores University and has a science podcast and accompanying book, Say Why to Drugs, which explores substance use.

== Education ==
Gage is from Missenden, Buckinghamshire, where she completed GCE Advanced Levels in Maths, Biology, Music and English at Dr Challoner's High School. She received her Bachelor of Science degree in Psychology in 2004 and Master of Science degree in cognitive neuropsychology from University College London in 2005. Prior to her PhD, Gage concentrated on language, specifically the impact of early language learning on later ability. Her PhD, which she completed at the University of Bristol in 2014, used the Avon Longitudinal Study of Parents and Children to investigate associations of adolescent tobacco and cannabis use with mental health.

== Career and research ==
After her PhD, Gage remained in Bristol as a postdoctoral researcher in Marcus Munafo's Integrative Epidemiology Unit investigating causality in the associations between lifestyle behaviours and mental health outcomes. Here Gage taught a short course "Appraising Epidemiological Studies" and delivered lectures on Science Communication to MSc psychologists. Whilst at Bristol, she became a prominent voice in the public debate about recreational drug use. Suzi Gage was also keyboardist and vocalist in the Bristol-based band You & the Atom Bomb who released Shake Shake Hello!? (2006) and The Spirit of Things (2007) before disbanding.

Gage joined the University of Liverpool as a lecturer in 2017. She is a member of the Society for the Study of Addiction. She is the Social Media Editor for the journal Addiction. As of 2025, she is a Senior Lecturer at the Liverpool John Moores University.

=== Public engagement ===
Gage began writing for The Guardian as a PhD student at the University of Bristol. Since, she has written for The Economist, The Conversation, The Daily Telegraph and The Lancet Psychiatry. In June 2011 she won the science engagement activity I'm a Scientist, Get me out of here!. Gage started blogging in 2011, and her blog "Sifting the Evidence", focused on research and ideas in epidemiology and public health. In 2013 she appeared in the Science Grrl calendar, and in 2014 she appeared in their video "She Blinded Me with Science". She is an advocate for creativity within the sciences, and has argued "science and the arts don't exist in silos". Gage was a keynote speaker at the 2017 March for Science in Bristol.

Gage's podcast, Say Why to Drugs, explores the science around substance use. It is on Scoobius Pip's Distraction Pieces Network, and the rapper has co-hosted many of the episodes. The podcast has over 750,000 listeners, and won Gage the 2016 AAAS Award for Public Engagement with Science Early Career Award for Public Engagement with Science. She has also appeared in the University of Liverpool podcast series.

=== Awards and honours ===
- 2016 Early Career Award for Public Engagement with Science (American Association for the Advancement of Science)
- 2015 Ockham Award - Best Podcast (The Skeptic Magazine)
- 2015 Basic Science Network Travel Award (Society for Research in Nicotine and Tobacco)
- 2013 Media Fellowship with BBC Science (Competitive Fellowship, British Science Association)
- 2013 Public Communication Award (British Association for Psychopharmacology)
- 2012 UK Science Blog Prize (Good Thinking Society)
- 2012 Convocation Award (University of Bristol Alumni Network)
- 2011 I'm a Scientist, Get me out of here!
