= Baltis Vallis =

Vallis on Venus

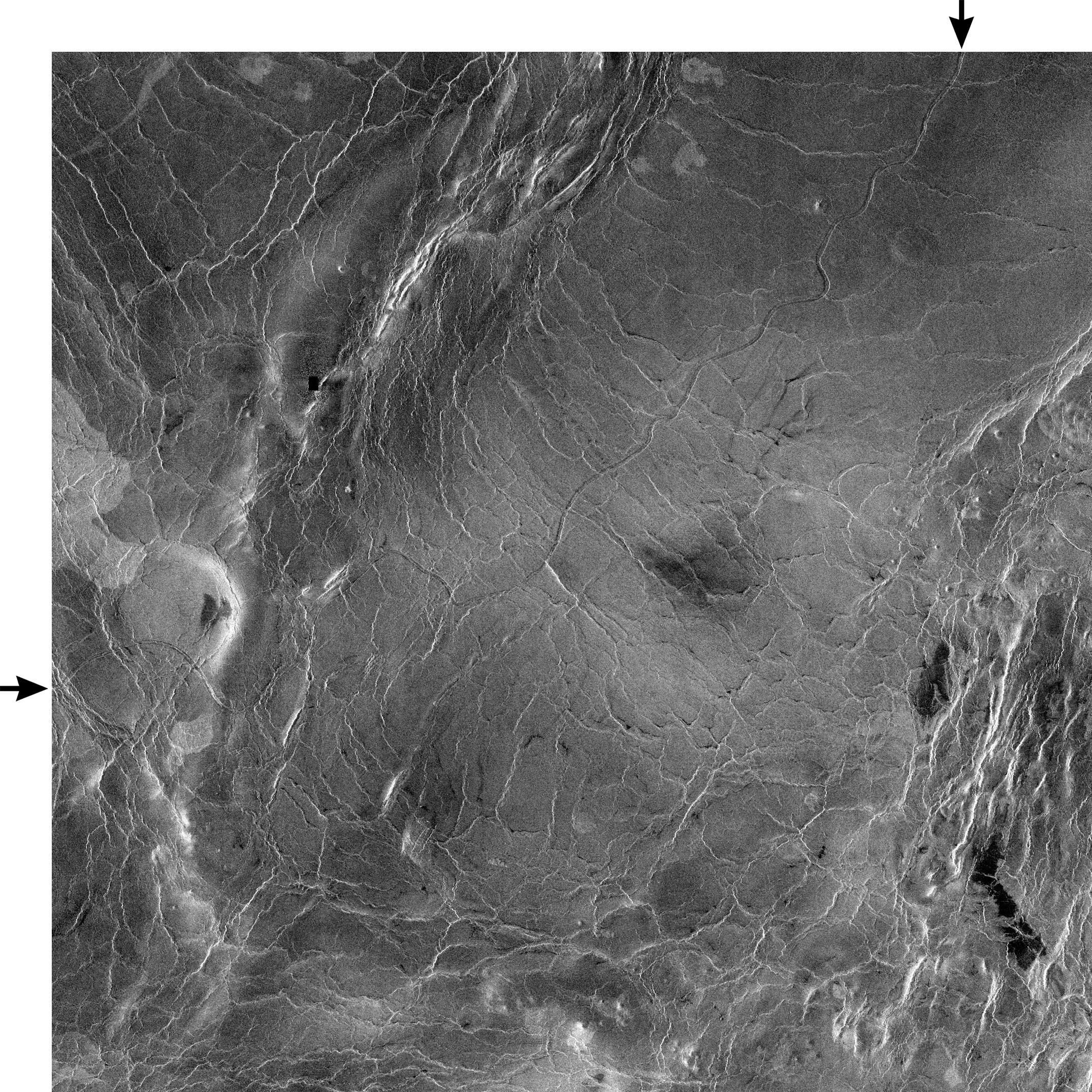
- A radar mosaic from Magellan showing a 600 km long segment of Baltis Vallis.
- Feature type: Vallis
- Coordinates: 37.3°N 161.4°E
- Diameter: 6,000 km
- Eponym: Syrian word for planet Venus.

Baltis Vallis /ˈbɔːltɪs ˈvælɪs/ is a sinuous channel on Venus ranging from 1–3 km (0.62–1.86 mi) wide and ~6,800 km (4,200 mi) long, slightly longer than the Nile and the longest known channel of any kind in the Solar System. It is thought the channel once held a river of lava. It is a single channel over most of its length, but anastomoses in several sections, for lengths of up to 400 km (250 mi). There appear to be other, smaller channels in the same area, down to the limit of resolution, some of which seem to be tributaries of Baltis Vallis.

The lava must have had a very low viscosity, possibly due to a carbonatite composition. At the volcano Ol Doinyo Lengai in Tanzania, natrocarbonatite lava erupts at around 780 K (510 °C), not far above Venus's mean ambient temperature of 735 K (462 °C). Analysis of cross-sectional profiles (using brightness data from Magellan synthetic aperture radar images) indicates that while Baltis Vallis does have levees, primarily in its first 1,500 km (930 mi), and intrachannel ridges, mainly in the segment 1,500–3,000 km (930–1,860 mi) from the source, the feature is primarily erosional, with a bottom surface 20–100 m (66–328 ft) below the surrounding plains at 90% of the sites studied. The average depths and widths of the channel are 46 ± 16 m and 2.2 ± 0.4 km, respectively.

The channel is located in an area consisting entirely of plains and wrinkle ridges. The formation of the channel may be associated with a single event that emplaced a large unit that type of volcanic terrain. The topography of the channel undulates over a range of over 2 km (1.2 mi), with some stretches traveling uphill, indicating that various regions have uplifted and/or subsided since the channel formed. At present, the terminus is slightly higher in elevation than the source.

Both ends of the channel are obscured, so its original length is unknown. The channel was initially discovered by the Soviet Venera 15 and 16 orbiters which, in spite of their one-kilometer resolution, detected more than 1,000 kilometers (620 mi) of the channel. Similar channel-like features are common on the plains of Venus. In some places they appear to have been formed by lava which may have melted or thermally eroded a path over the plains' surface. Most are 1–3 km (0.62–1.86 mi) wide. They resemble terrestrial meandering rivers in some aspects, with meanders, cutoff bows and abandoned channel segments. However, Venusian channels are not as tightly sinuous as terrestrial rivers. Most are partly buried by younger lava plains, making their sources difficult to identify. A few have vast radar-dark plains units associated with them, suggesting large flow volumes. These channels with large deposits appear to be older than other channel types, as they are crossed by fractures and wrinkle ridges, and are often buried by other volcanic materials. In addition, they appear to run both upslope and downslope, suggesting that the plains were warped by regional tectonism after channel formation.
