= Universe Today =

English-language science news outlet

- Website type: News and articles
- Available in: English
- Owner: Fraser Cain
- Creator: Fraser Cain
- Website: www.universetoday.com
- Commercial: No
- Registration: Optional
- Launched: March 23, 1999; 27 years ago

YouTube information
- Channel: FraserCain
- Genres: Space; Astronomy
- Subscribers: 446,000
- Views: 75.3 million
- Last updated: August 8, 2024

Universe Today (U.T.) is a North American-based non-commercial space and astronomy news website founded by Fraser Cain. The domain was registered on December 30, 1998, and the website went live in March 1999. Universe Today assumed its current form on July 24, 2003, featuring astronomy news and other space-related content.

In early September 2005, the website’s forum section merged with Bad Astronomy to create a combined site with the BAUT forum. During April 2011, the Association of British Science Writers noted that Universe Today decided not to make preparations for reporting on embargoed stories until they are public knowledge.

Emily Lakdawalla said that she relies on Universe Today and Bad Astronomy to "give ... an independent look at big news stories".

== Publications ==
Universe Today has published two books, which are available both as e-books and on physical media:

- Plotner, Tammy; Barbour, Jeff (2006). What's Up 2006: 365 Days of Skywatching (PDF). ISBN 978-1-4116-8287-0.
- Plotner, Tammy (2006). What's Up 2007: 365 Days of Skywatching. ISBN 978-0-9782214-0-9. Archived from the original on 2007-02-02.

== See also ==
- Astronomy Cast
- Space.com
- The Space Show
