= Astronomy Cast =

Astronomy podcast

- Astronomy Cast Logo
- Genre: Astronomy
- Language: English

Cast and voices
- Hosted by: Fraser Cain; Dr. Pamela Gay

Production
- Length: Approximately 30 minutes

Technical specifications
- Audio format: MP3

Publication
- Original release: September 10, 2006; 19 years ago

Astronomy Cast is an educational nonprofit podcast discussing various topics in the field of astronomy. The specific subject matter of each episode shifts from week to week, ranging from planets and stars to cosmology and mythbusting. Premiering on September 10, 2006, the weekly show is co-hosted by Fraser Cain and Dr. Pamela L. Gay. Fraser Cain is the publisher of the space and astronomy news site Universe Today and has a YouTube channel with over 200,000 subscribers. The other host, Dr. Pamela L. Gay, is a Senior Education and Communication Specialist and Senior Scientist for the Planetary Science Institute and the director of CosmoQuest. Each show usually has a length of approximately 30 minutes, and all shows, past and present, are accessible for download through the Astronomy Cast archive, as well as in podcast format.

The Astronomy Cast official website also hosts the blog Astronomy Cast LIVE, which covers select astronomy meetings using various bloggers, including Cain, Gay, and Phil Plait, as well as recent astronomy-related news and events. A public forum, the Astronomy Cast Forum, where registered members and site visitors may share and exchange valuable information can also be found on the website and is created under Bad Astronomer and Universe Today Forum.

== Format ==
Labeled as "a fact-based journey through the cosmos" that aims to help the listeners understand "not only what we know, but how we know what we know," the show offers a large amount of information in the form of a conversation between the two co-hosts, with more resources and show notes available on the show's website to aid the listeners in their attempt to understand the material covered. Several "enhanced" podcast episodes accompanied by pictures have also been released, but this experiment was terminated due to the large file size associated with the pictures and small number of downloads compared to the regular format.

There are also episodes in which listeners' questions are answered. Initially the question shows were produced irregularly (ten shows as of September 2008), but as the number of questions received increased a question show will be released weekly when possible. The hosts have also experimented with student questions shows where they have sent recording equipment to schools who have requested it. The students have then recorded questions to ask the hosts, which are then answered and edited into a special show available separately on the Astronomy Cast website. As of June 2008, two shows have been done in this format, and this ongoing project has been sponsored by NASA's Gamma-ray Large Area Space Telescope.

Astronomy Cast has covered a wide variety of topics ranging from the planets in the Solar System to the end of the universe, from the Big Bang to black holes. All previous episodes can be downloaded from the Astronomy Cast website archive in MP3 format or through major pod-catching software such as iTunes.

As of September 2019, the shows are streamed live on the Astronomy Cast YouTube channel and are co-streamed live on CosmoQuest's Twitch channel. The opening 20–30 minute segment dealing with the topic of the week is then later converted into podcast format. Where time permits, both hosts often continue to stream for approximately another half hour, answering questions posed to them on the topic just covered, as well as other astronomy & science related subjects. The questions are posed by viewers of the live stream who post in the YouTube chat during the broadcast, as well as on other social media platforms. The full, unedited version of the video is then uploaded to the Astronomy Cast channel, as well as to those of CosmoQuest and Fraser Cain, while the edited podcast is uploaded soon after.

== Audience ==
The listeners of Astronomy Cast vary widely in demographics, but the vast majority is between the ages of 18 and 53 according to a conducted survey. It is believed that the lack of young listeners is caused by the fact that Astronomy Cast may prove slightly too advanced for a younger audience and that the shortage of older listeners is due to the generation's relative unfamiliarity with technology and portable devices. Moreover, although Astronomy Cast is aimed at both the male and female audiences, only about 9% of the listeners are female.

== Milestones ==
Astronomy Cast was nominated for the Technology/Science section of the 2008 People's Choice Podcast Awards.

As of September 2024, Astronomy Cast has produced over 700 podcasts.

In 2017, the hosts of Astronomy Cast were invited to a week-long celebration hosted by Twitch (service) in honor of Science Week. Fraser Cain and Dr. Pamela L. Gay were two of many prominent personalities in the space and science field to be interviewed for the event.

In July 2018, Astronomy Cast was mentioned in an article written by Mental Floss. The magazine included Astronomy Cast in a list they called, "15 Podcasts That Will Make You Feel Smarter."

In September 2018, Astronomy Cast recorded its 500th episode in front of a live audience, in addition to the usual YouTube live stream. The event was part of the AC:500 celebration, an event which was primarily organized & executed by the fans & supporters of the series, and in association with the Weekly Space Hangout, which also recorded & streamed a live episode during the event. The event was held in Edwardsville, IL, from September 14–16, 2018, and included a live recording of one of Cain's "Q & A" videos on various space-related topics, an astronomy-inspired "planet painting" art session with Dr. Gay, and a sidewalk astronomy event held in conjunction with various fans of the show, members of local star-gazing societies, which was open free of charge to the general public & passers-by.

== See also ==
- Universe Today
