= List of regiones on Venus =

Regiones are large areas marked by reflectivity or color distinctions from adjacent areas, or a broad geographic region, on Venus. In accordance to the International Astronomical Union's rules of planetary nomenclature, they are named after female Giants and Titans. There are 22 named regiones on Venus.

Name	Center latitude (deg)	Center longitude (deg)	Feature diameter (km)	Origin of name
Alpha Regio	−25.50	0.30	1897.00	First letter in Greek alphabet.
Asteria Regio	21.60	267.50	1131.00	Greek Titaness.
Atla Regio	9.20	200.10	3200.00	Norse giantess, mother of Heimdall.
Bell Regio	32.80	51.40	1778.00	English giantess.
Beta Regio	25.30	282.80	2869.00	Second letter in Greek alphabet.
Dione Regio	−31.50	328.00	2300.00	Greek Titanness; 1st wife of Zeus.
Dsonkwa Regio	−53.00	167.00	1500.00	Kwakiutl (NW Coast) forest giantess.
Eistla Regio	10.50	21.50	8015.00	Norse giantess.
Hyndla Regio	22.50	294.50	2300.00	Norse wood giantess.
Imdr Regio	−43.00	212.00	1611.00	Norse giantess.
Ishkus Regio	−61.00	245.00	1000.00	Makah (NW Coast) forest giantess.
Laufey Regio	7.00	315.00	2100.00	Norse giantess.
Metis Regio	70.90	251.80	729.00	Greek Titaness
Mnemosyne Regio	65.80	277.90	0.00	Greek Titaness
Neringa Regio	−65.00	288.00	1100.00	Lithuanian seacoast giantess.
Ovda Regio	−2.80	85.60	5280.00	Marijian; Titaness having supernatural power.
Phoebe Regio	−6.00	282.80	2852.00	Greek Titaness.
Tethus Regio	66.00	120.00	0.00	Greek Titaness.
Themis Regio	−37.40	284.20	1811.00	Greek Titaness.
Thetis Regio	−11.40	129.90	2801.00	Greek Titaness.
Ulfrun Regio	27.00	225.00	3954.00	Norse giantess.
Vasilisa Regio	−11.00	332.00	1200.00	Russian tale heroine.
