= Tessera (Venus) =

Region of deformed terrain on Venus

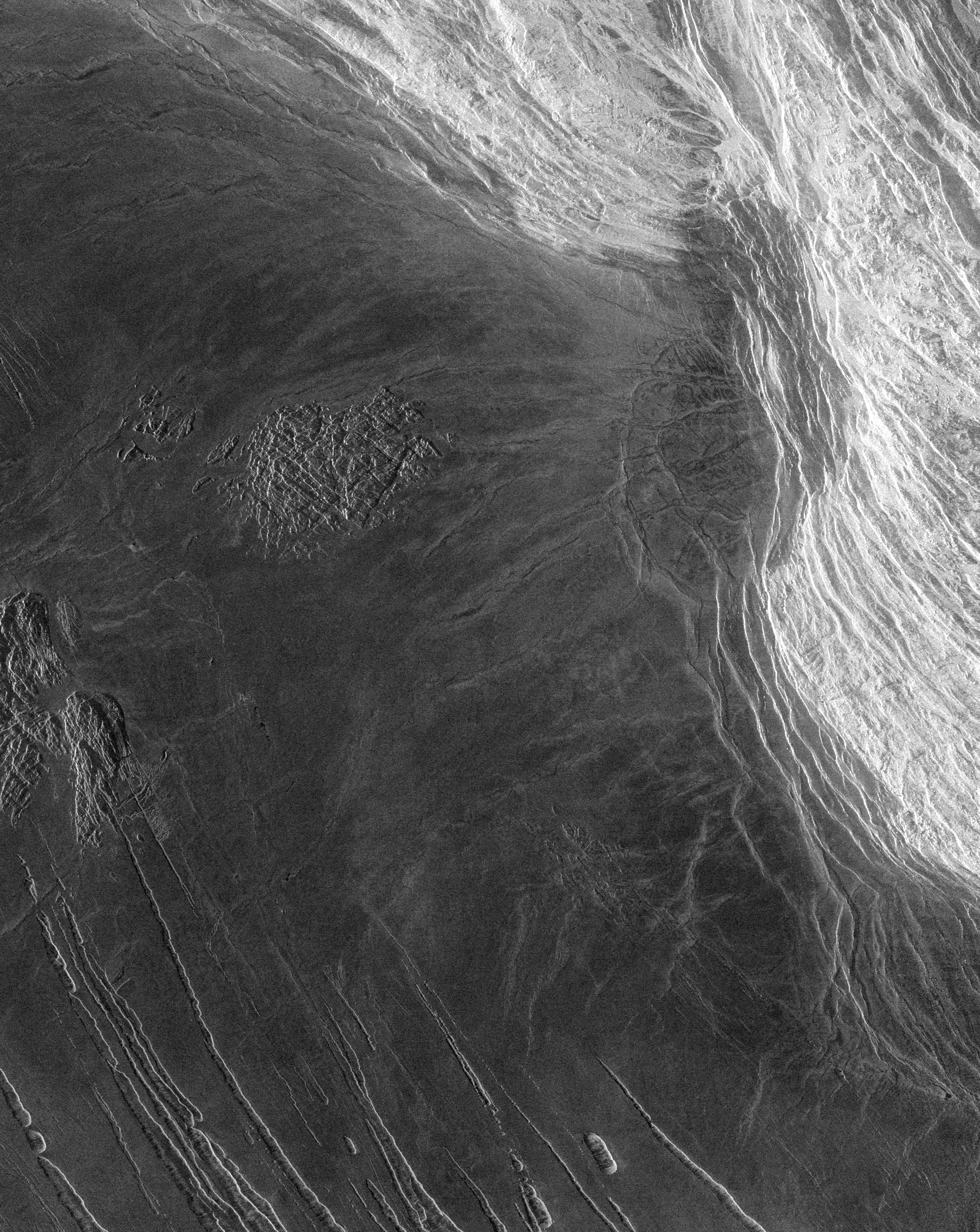
Tessera terrain in the Maxwell Montes seen in white on the right of the image. Eastern edge of Lakshmi Planum seen in gray on the left.

A tessera (plural tesserae) is a region of heavily deformed terrain on Venus, characterized by two or more intersecting tectonic elements, high topography, and subsequent high radar backscatter. Tesserae often represent the oldest material at any given location and are among the most tectonically deformed terrains on Venus's surface. Diverse types of tessera terrain exist. It is not currently clear if this is due to a variety in the interactions of Venus's mantle with regional crustal or lithospheric stresses, or if these diverse terrains represent different locations in the timeline of crustal plateau formation and fall. Multiple models of tessera formation exist and further extensive studies of Venus's surface are necessary to fully understand this complex terrain.

== Exploration ==
Pioneer Venus Orbiter detected regions of anomalous radar properties and high backscatter. Using SAR imaging, the Venera 15 and Venera 16 orbiters revealed these regions to be chaotically tiled terrain, which Soviet scientists named "паркет" (parquet, pronounced par-key'yet), later known as "tesserae." The most recent data concerning tessera terrain comes from the Magellan Mission, in which the majority of Venus's surface was mapped in high resolution (~100 m/pixel). Future missions to Venus would allow for further understanding of tessera terrain.

== Locations ==
Tesserae are recognized as covering 7.3% of Venus's surface, approximately 3.32×10^{7} square kilometres (1.28×10^{7} sq mi), and occur mostly within a few extensive provinces. They are heavily concentrated between 0^{°}E and 150^{°}E. These longitudes represent a large area between a crustal extension center in the Aphrodite Terra and a crustal convergence center in Ishtar Terra. Tesserae are exposed almost entirely within Venus's crustal plateaus. Tessera inliers, regions of tessera not found within current crustal plateaus are thought to represent regions of collapsed crustal plateaus. Large regions of tessera terrain are labelled based on their latitude. Regions in the equatorial and southern latitudes are labelled as "regio" while regions in the northern latitudes are labelled as "tesserae."

A comprehensive list of regiones and tesserae can be found under List of geological features on Venus. Some well explored regions of tessera include:

- Aphrodite Terra
- Alpha Regio
- Beta Regio
- Fortuna Tessera
- Ovda Regio

Interpretive outline of tessera terrain (white outline) imposed on "GIS Map of Venus" (GIS Map of Venus source: USGS Astrogeology Science Center)

== Formation ==
Model of crustal plateau and tessera terrain formation via mantle downwelling after Gilmore (1998).

Tesserae represent an ancient time of globally thin lithosphere on Venus. Tessera Terrain does not participate in the global resurfacing events of Venus. It was thought by many researches that the tesserae might form a global "onion skin" of sorts, and extended beneath Venus's regional plains. However, the currently accepted models support regional formation. Multiple models have been put forward to explain the formation of tessera terrain. Models of formation by mantle downwelling and pulsating continents are the most currently accepted models. A model of formation due to a lava pond via bolide impact was put forth, although it has not currently gained much traction in the scientific community due to skepticism of the ability of a bolide impact to generate sufficient melt. A model of formation due to mantle plumes (upwelling) was persistent for many years, however, it has since been abandoned due to its contradictory prediction of sequences of extension versus the observed cross cutting relationships.

=== Downwelling ===
Model of crustal plateau and tessera terrain formation after Hansen (2006).

In the downwelling model, mantle downwelling, possibly due to mantle convection, causes compression and thickening of the crust, creating the compressional elements of tessera terrain. Isostatic rebound occurs due to the crustal thickening. After downwelling ends, a delamination event within the mantle produces extensional elements of tessera. This model does not currently explain tessera's location within crustal plateaus, and instead predicts a domical shape.

=== Lava pond via giant impact ===
In the lava pond via giant impact model, melt due to a bolide impact on a thin lithosphere rises to the surface to form a lava pond. Convection throughout the lava pond resulted in surface deformation that created tessera terrain. Isostatic rebound of the solidified pond creates a crustal plateau structure. This model does not currently explain how convection could transmit enough force to deform several kilometers of brittle material.

=== Pulsating continents ===
Pulsating continents model

In the pulsating continents model, differentiated, low density crust survives early global subduction events forming continental regions. These regions undergo compression due to heating from the surrounding mantle, forming the compressional features of tessera, such as fold and thrust belts, and basin dome terrain. After sufficient crustal thickening has occurred, new lithosphere is generated causing gravitational collapse, producing the extensional features of tessera, such as extensive grabens. During this collapse, decompression causes partial melting, producing the intratessera volcanism seen within the larger regions of tessera terrain. This model requires that the material comprising tessera terrain is continental in nature. Future missions to Venus to sample surface compositions are necessary to support this model. This model does not currently explain how a global subduction event could cause the delamination of the entire mantle lithosphere, leaving only low density crust behind.

== Variety of tessera terrain ==
Individual patterns of tessera terrain record the variations in interactions of the mantle with local regional stresses. This variation manifests itself in a wide array of diverse terrain types. Multiple types of sampled tessera terrain are below, however, they are not meant as a classification scheme, and instead emphasize the variety of terrain types.

Fold Terrain is easily recognizable by its well defined linear fabrics. This type of terrain is composed of long ridges and valleys, greater than 100 km long, that are cross cut by minor extensional fractures that run perpendicular to the fold axes of the ridges. This likely formed due to unidirectional contraction.

Lava Flow Terrain is named such due to its resemblance to Pahoehoe flows found on Earth, with long curving ridges. It is thought that this terrain may be formed due to displacement and deformation due to movement of the material beneath these crustal pieces.

Ribbon Terrain is characterized by ribbons and folds that are typically orthogonal to one another. Ribbons are long and narrow extensional troughs that are separated by narrow ridges. Ribbon terrain can be found both in large crustal plateaus and within tessera inliers.

S-C Terrain is named such due to its geometric similarity to S-C tectonic fabrics on Earth. It consists of two main structures: synchronous folds and small, 5 to 20 km long graben that cross cut the folds perpendicularly. Unlike many other types of tessera terrain, S-C terrain indicates a simple, rather than complex deformation history in which deformation due to widespread motion on Venus is widely distributed. This type of terrain also indicates that strike-slip movement on Venus's surface is possible.

Basin and Dome Terrain, also known as honeycomb terrain, consists of curved ridges and troughs that form a pattern analogous to an egg carton. These structures represent multiple phases of deformation, and are considered the most complex appearing style of tessera. Basin and dome terrain is typically found within the center of crustal plateaus.

Star Terrain is composed of multiple graben and fractures that trend in many directions, but radiate in a star-like pattern. This pattern is thought to be due to doming underneath previously deformed and fractured areas, in which the local uplift causes the radiating pattern.
