= List of quadrangles on Venus =

The surface of Venus has been divided into 8 quadrangles at the 1:10,000,000 map scale, or 62 quadrangles at the 1:5,000,000 map scale.

== 1:10,000,000 map scale ==
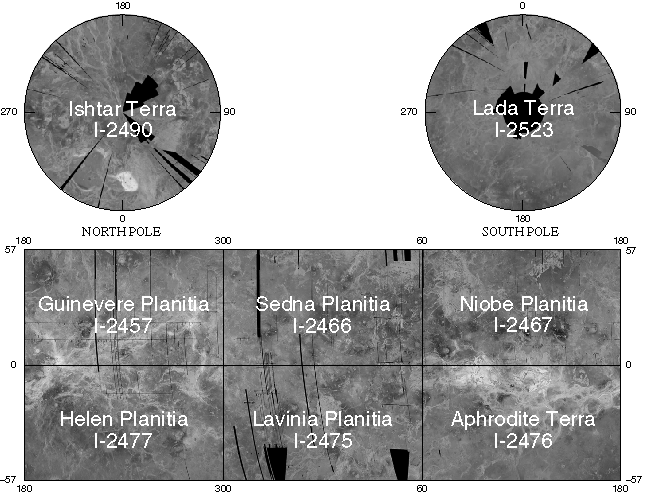
Venus' 1:10,000,000 map quadrangles

Name	Number	Latitude	Longitude
Ishtar Terra	I-2490	57-90° N	0-360° E
Guinevere Planitia	I-2457	0-57° N	180-300° E
Sedna Planitia	I-2466	0-57° N	300-60° E
Niobe Planitia	I-2467	0-57° N	60-180° E
Helen Planitia	I-2477	0-57° S	180-300° E
Lavinia Planitia	I-2475	0-57° S	300-60° E
Aphrodite Terra	I-2476	0-57° S	60-180° E
Lada Terra	I-2523	57-90° S	0-360° E

Ishtar Terra
Guinevere Planitia	Sedna Planitia	Niobe Planitia
Helen Planitia	Lavinia Planitia	Aphrodite Terra
Lada Terra

== 1:5,000,000 map scale ==
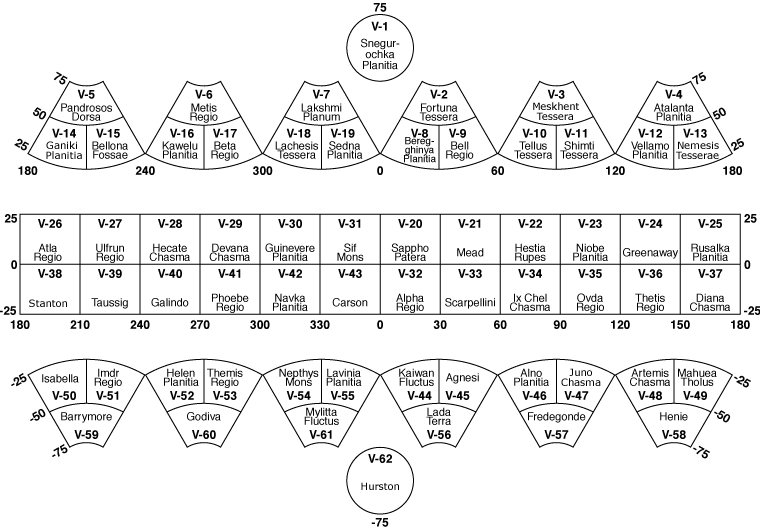
Diagram of Venus' 1:5,000,000 map quadrangles

Name	Number	Latitude	Longitude
Snegurochika Planitia	V-1	75-90° N	0-360° E
Fortuna Tessera	V-2	50-75° N	0-60° E
Meskhent Tessera	V-3	50-75° N	60-120° E
Atalanta Planitia	V-4	50-75° N	120-180° E
Pandrosos Dorsa	V-5	50-75° N	180-240° E
Metis Regio	V-6	50-75° N	240-300° E
Lakshima Planum	V-7	50-75° N	300-360° E
Bereghinya Planitia	V-8	25-50° N	0-30° E
Bell Regio	V-9	25-50° N	30-60° E
Tellus Tessera	V-10	25-50° N	60-90° E
Shimti Tessera	V-11	25-50° N	90-120° E
Vellamo Planitia	V-12	25-50° N	120-150° E
Nemesis Tesserae	V-13	25-50° N	150-180° E
Ganiki Planitia	V-14	25-50° N	180-210° E
Bellona Fossae	V-15	25-50° N	210-240° E
Kawelu Planitia	V-16	25-50° N	240-270° E
Beta Regio	V-17	25-50° N	270-300° E
Lachesis Tessera	V-18	25-50° N	300-330° E
Sedna Planitia	V-19	25-50° N	330-360° E
Sappho Patera	V-20	0-25° N	0-30° E
Mead	V-21	0-25° N	30-60° E
Hestia Rupes	V-22	0-25° N	60-90° E
Niobe Planitia	V-23	0-25° N	90-120° E
Greenaway	V-24	0-25° N	120-150° E
Rusalka Planitia	V-25	0-25° N	150-180° E
Atla Regio	V-26	0-25° N	180-210° E
Ulfrun Regio	V-27	0-25° N	210-240° E
Hecate Chasma	V-28	0-25° N	240-270° E
Devana Chasma	V-29	0-25° N	270-300° E
Guinevere Planitia	V-30	0-25° N	300-330° E
Sif Mons	V-31	0-25° N	330-360° E
Alpha Regio	V-32	0-25° S	0-30° E
Scarpellini	V-33	0-25° S	30-60° E
Ix Chel Chasma	V-34	0-25° S	60-90° E
Ovda Regio	V-35	0-25° S	90-120° E
Thetis Regio	V-36	0-25° S	120-150° E
Diana Chasma	V-37	0-25° S	150-180° E
Stanton	V-38	0-25° S	180-210° E
Taussig	V-39	0-25° S	210-240° E
Galindo	V-40	0-25° S	240-270° E
Phoebe Regio	V-41	0-25° S	270-300° E
Navka Planitia	V-42	0-25° S	300-330° E
Carson	V-43	0-25° S	330-360° E
Kaiwan Fluctus	V-44	25-50° S	0-30° E
Agnesi	V-45	25-50° S	30-60° E
Alno Planitia	V-46	25-50° S	60-90° E
Juno Chasma	V-47	25-50° S	90-120° E
Artemis Chasma	V-48	25-50° S	120-150° E
Mahuea Tholus	V-49	25-50° S	150-180° E
Isabella	V-50	25-50° S	180-210° E
Imdr Regio	V-51	25-50° S	210-240° E
Helen Planitia	V-52	25-50° S	240-270° E
Themis Regio	V-53	25-50° S	270-300° E
Nepthys Mons	V-54	25-50° S	300-330° E
Lavinia Planitia	V-55	25-50° S	330-360° E
Lada Terra	V-56	50-75° S	0-60° E
Fredegonde	V-57	50-75° S	60-120° E
Heine	V-58	50-75° S	120-180° E
Barrymore	V-59	50-75° S	180-240° E
Godiva	V-60	50-75° S	240-300° E
Mylitta Fluctus	V-61	50-75° S	300-360° E
Hurston	V-62	75-90° S	0-360° E

== See also ==
- List of quadrangles on Mercury
- List of quadrangles on the Moon
- List of quadrangles on Mars
