= Nilokeras Scopulus =

Geologic feature of Mars

False color oblique view of Nilokeras Scopulus looking north. The cratered plateau at top is Tempe Terra. The dark greenish, smooth area at bottom is floodplain of Kasei Valles. The light blue area at bottom left is a portion of the (younger) central channel of N. Kasei Vallis. Image is Mars Orbital Laser Altimeter (MOLA) colorized elevation overlying Thermal Emission Imaging System (THEMIS) Infrared (IR) daytime mosaic from Mars Odyssey spacecraft. Yellow and light green represent high elevations; dark green and blue are lower elevations. Image is approximately 175 km across. Vertical exaggeration is 3X.

Nilokeras Scopulus based on THEMIS day-time image

Nilokeras Scopulus is a long escarpment (cliff) in the northern hemisphere of the planet Mars. It is located along the southeastern boundary of the Tempe Terra plateau and forms the northern valley wall (wallrock boundary) of the downstream portion of the immense Kasei Valles outflow channel system. The escarpment is 765 km long and ranges from 1 to a little over 2 km (3300–6600 ft) in height.

For most of its length, Nilokeras Scopulus lies between lat. 31° and 32° N. It trends west-east, extending from approximately long. 297° to 309° E. The escarpment curves northward at the eastern edge of Tempe Terra where the northern segment of Kasei Valles debouches into Chryse and southwestern Acidalia Planitiae.

== Name origin ==
Nilokeras, which is Greek for "horn of the Nile," was the name given by astronomer E. M. Antoniadi in 1930 to a telescopic albedo feature and canal centered at lat. 30° N., long. 55° W. (See List of Martian canals.) Scopulus is a descriptor term used in planetary geology for an irregular escarpment or cliff. The International Astronomical Union (IAU) formally adopted the name Nilokeras Scopulus in 1976. Scopulus is the Latin term for "crag" or cliff.

== Geology ==
In geomorphology, an escarpment (usually shortened to scarp) is any steep, abrupt slope or cliff along the margin of a plateau, terrace, or other topographic bench. A scarp may be formed by tectonic, erosional, or depositional processes. The term carries no implication of geologic origin.

Nilokeras Scopulus likely formed from a combination of faulting and erosion from flood waters that formed Kasei Valles. Recent geologic mapping of the Kasei Valles region indicates that the west-to-east flow of the Kasei Valles floods followed the existing structural trend of rift valleys in southern Tempe Terra. Thus, the proto-Nilokeras Scopulus was probably an east-west oriented fault scarp or fracture zone (or zone of weakness) that was eroded and further downcut by at least one (and possibly two) episodes of early catastrophic flooding from the northern Tharsis region. (See outflow channels.) These floods occurred in Hesperian time between about 3.6 and 3.4 billion years ago (Gya).

After initial flooding, the northern Kasei valley was covered by extensive late Hesperian-aged basaltic lava flows from Tharsis. Two final episode of flooding from the Echus Chasma region to the south occurred in Kasei Valles during Amazonian times (<1.8 Gya). The later floods carved the channels south of Nilokeras Scopulus and may not have strongly influenced development of the scarp.

During the course of its history, Nilokeras Scopulus has been subjected to glacial/periglacial processes and modified by groundwater sapping, slumping, collapse, and other mass wasting processes. Rocks making up the scarp face are Noachian or Early Hesperian in age (>3.6 Gya). They probably consist of ancient impact breccias and volcanic materials. Layered bedrock is visible at the top of the escarpment in some medium and high resolution spacecraft images, but the scarp face is largely covered by talus aprons and dust.

== See also ==
- Outflow channels
- Scopulus
- Kasei Valles
- Tempe Terra
