= Devana Chasma =

Rift zone on Venus

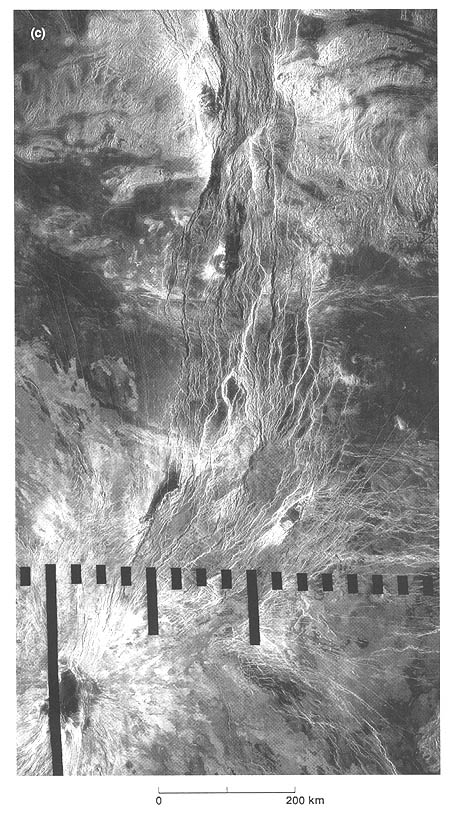
- Devana Chasma, middle. Theia Mons, a major shield volcano, is at the bottom left
- Coordinates: 22°N 183.5°E
- Diameter: 2000 km
- Eponym: Devana

Devana Chasma is a weak extensional rift zone on Venus, with a length of 4000 km, a width of 150–250 km, and a depth reaching 5 km. Most of the faults are facing north–south. The rift is located in Beta Regio, a 3000 km rise created by volcanic activity. Mantle plumes rising from the bottom are the reason behind the formation of the rift zone. The slow extension rates in the rift may be driven by the same reason.

== Geology ==
The formation of the region went through different events with time:

1. Uplifting of the mantle plume in Beta Regio and Phoebe Regio: The rising of the mantle plume pushes the crust to create the volcanic rises.
2. Formation of the shield volcano Theia Mons and Devana Chasma: The lava escapes through the crust forming Theia Mons volcano and the begin of the rifting.
3. Overlapping of the two mantle plumes forming the offset zone: The offset zone is formed when the two different plumes change in their thermal energy

=== Background information ===
Rift zones are features that related to volcanoes in general and shield volcanoes specially, this feature consists of linear opening in the ground where the lava can spread from the side of the volcano not only from the summit. Repeated eruptions causes more lava to come and activate the rift zone which causes the extension of the crust.

The Devana Chasma formed along the Beta Regio and Phoebe Regio volcanic rises, these different volcanic highlands formed due different mantle plumes. These extensional faults are 4000 km long and can be divided to two main parts, the northern part which covers around 700 km between Theia Mons and Rhea Mons which formed via Beta Regio mantle plume. The southern part cover the rest and formed due Phoebe Regio mantle plume. Arecibo radar images and Magellan spacecraft helped in studying the Beta Regio region and shading the light on the Devana Chasma rift system.

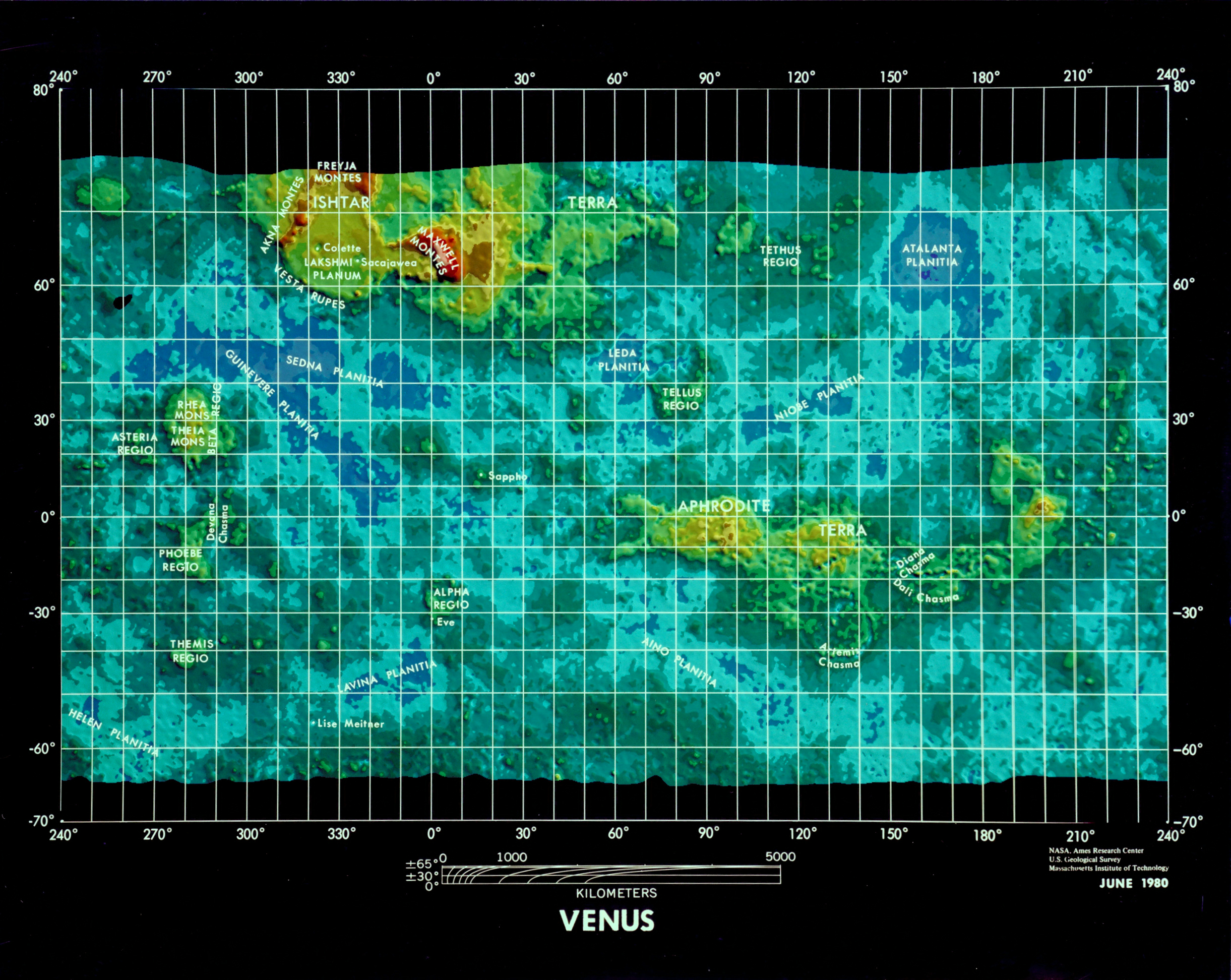
Venus Map with labels of regions

=== Rift development ===
The lack of erosion and deformation processes record the history and development of Venus. Evidences from the images of the Beta Regio shows the history behind the region, the rise of the region is caused by an uplift of the mantle plume, which caused the formation of Theia Mons shield volcano. The Devana Chasma rift system were also constructed by the uplift, and became active due to the Theia Mons volcano. Furthermore, these evidences proposed several aspects concerning the development and history of the rift zone. Nowadays, the rift zone is still active but the rifting is much slower because of the relative cold mantle plume. In previous centuries, the mantle plumes were hotter and the rifting rate were faster, but the mantle got colder and that consistent with the current cold plate of Venus.

Formation of rift zone. A. Beginning of the uplift and the rise of the mantle plume, B. Beginning of the rift zone formation and with local magma chambers, C. Shield volcano formation and activating of the rift zone and spreading the crust

== Comparison between Venus and Earth rift systems ==
Due to the similarities between Earth and Venus, it is suggested that they have a similar lithospheric elastic thickness of ~30 km. East African Rift is the only rift that can be compared to Devana Chasma. Both rifts have fault segments length around ~100 km, which makes them stronger than any extensional system on Earth. However, they differ in their half grabens, East African Rifts' half grabens are around 50 km wide while on Venus it is around 150 km. In East African Rift, the higher elastic thickness can explain the wide half grabens. However, on Venus the main force is the high shear stress due to the cold lithosphere, which require the faults to be stronger in order to move. As a result, it has a wider half grabens than the one on Earth. Studying and comparing these two rift systems help us to understand how volcanism and tectonic activities affected the development and formation of the Beta Regio region on Venus.
