= Theia Mons =

Volcano on Venus

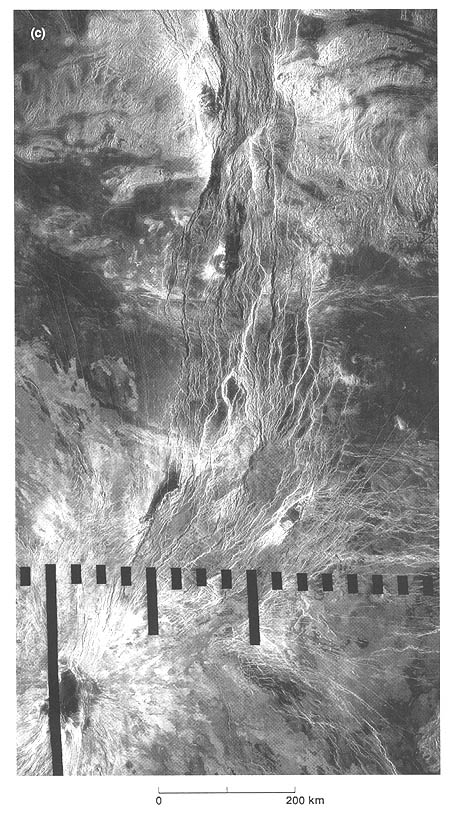
- Beta Regio on Venus, with Theia Mons visible at the bottom left
- Feature type: Shield volcano
- Location: Beta Regio, Venus
- Coordinates: 22.7°N 281.0°E
- Diameter: 226 km (140 mi)
- Peak: ~6 km (3.7 mi) (above planetary mean)
- Eponym: Theia

Theia Mons is a large highland shield volcano on the planet Venus. Located near the center of Beta Regio, a large region of recent volcanic uplift due to a currently active mantle plume, Theia Mons is situated at the junction of three branches of Devana Chasma, an extensive rift system. It is named after Theia, a Titan from Greek mythology; the name Theia Mons was officially approved by the International Astronomical Union (IAU) in 1979.

== Geology ==
Situated in a region of widespread tectonic activity, Theia Mons formed after tectonic rifting at Devana Chasma was initiated. Three major rifts radiate from Theia Mons's edifice. The south arm—which extends to Phoebe Regio—and the north arm collectively comprise Devana Chasma. The southwest arm, which is smaller, forms Žverine Chasma. Volcanic flows from Theia Mons largely fill in these rift branches up to 300 kilometres (190 miles) from its central caldera. The location of these rifts suggest that Theia Mons's formation and evolution may be linked to an apparent triple junction between Devana Chasma and Žverine Chasma.

Theia Mons is surrounded by a large radial dike swarm and has four major groups of lava flows near its summit caldera. The oldest group of lava flows do not appear to originate from the caldera, and are partially obscured by younger generations of lava flows. A group of lava flows north of Theia Mons also do not appear to originate from its central caldera, and may have been sourced from an older caldera that was later destroyed by rifting at Devana Chasma. The longest lava flows from the central caldera exceed 700 kilometres (430 miles) in length, and the combined area of the lava flows is approximately 650,000 km^{2} (250,000 sq mi).

== See also ==
- Volcanism on Venus
