= List of terrae on Venus =

This is a list of terrae, or major landmasses, on Venus. In accordance to the International Astronomical Union's rules of planetary nomenclature, they are named after goddesses of love.

There are only three named terrae on Venus:

Name	North latitude (deg)	West longitude (deg)	Feature diameter (km)
Aphrodite Terra	−5.8	104.8	10,000.0
Ishtar Terra	70.4	27.5	5,610.0
Lada Terra	−62.5	20.0	8,615.0

- Aphrodite Terra is named after the Greek love goddess, the counterpart to Venus in Roman mythology. It is located on the southern hemisphere, just below the Equator.
- Ishtar Terra is named after a Babylonian love goddess. It is located on the northern hemisphere. Among its prominent features is the highest point on Venus, Maxwell Montes
- Lada Terra is named after the Slavic goddess of love. It is located in the largely unknown Southern Polar area.

== See also ==
- List of terrae on Mars
