= Asteria Regio =

Region of the planet Venus

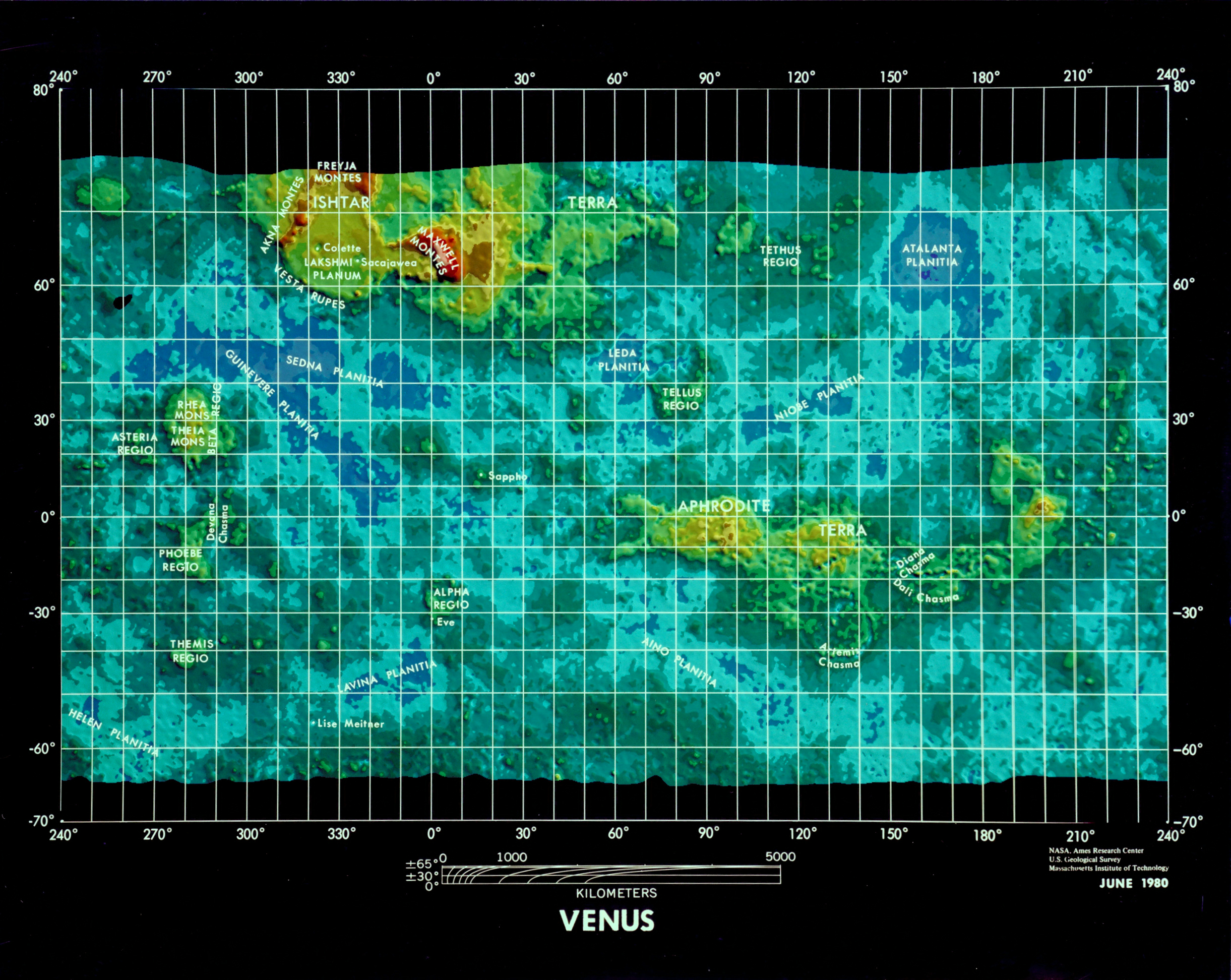
- Early global topographic map of Venus, with Asteria Regio near the left edge
- Feature type: Regio/region
- Coordinates: 21.6°N 267.5°E
- Diameter: 1,137 KM
- Eponym: Asteria, Greek goddess

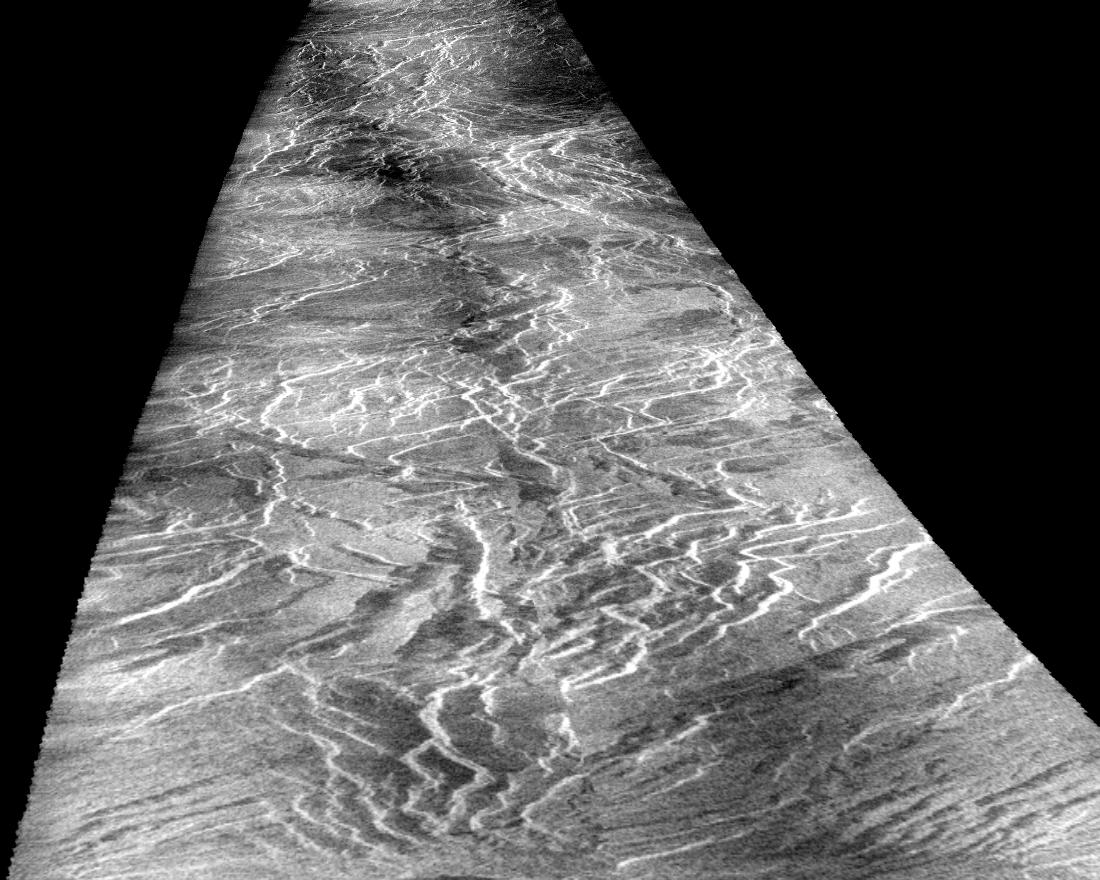
Asteria Regio and Phoebe Regio, as imaged by the Magellan spacecraft. Asteria Regio is in the northwest, Phoebe Regio in the southeast.

Asteria Regio is a geological region on the planet Venus, located in the northern hemisphere near the western portion of the Ishtar Terra highlands and bordered on the southeast by Phoebe Regio.

Located in the Hecate Chasma (v28) quadrangle, it lies approximately between 26.1°N 263.5ºE and 17.1ºN 271.5º. The region spans 1131 kilometers in diameter and is named after Asteria, a figure from Greek mythology associated with the stars and prophetic dreams.

Asteria Regio is characterized by complex tectonic and volcanic features, including fractures, ridges, and lava plains. The region's morphology suggests significant geological activity in Venus's past, likely related to mantle upwelling or lithospheric deformation.

The surface of Asteria Regio has been mapped in detail by radar imaging, particularly by NASA’s Magellan mission (1990–1994), which provided high-resolution data for Venus's surface despite its dense cloud cover.

== See also ==
- Alpha Regio
- Beta Regio
- Ovda Regio
