= Scopulus =

Lobate or irregular escarpment

False color oblique view of Nilokeras Scopulus on Mars. Mars Orbital Laser Altimeter (MOLA) colorized elevation overlying Thermal Emission Imaging System (THEMIS) Infrared (IR) daytime mosaic from Mars Odyssey spacecraft. Yellow and light green represent high elevations; dark green and blue are lower elevations. Image is approximately 175 km across. Vertical exaggeration is 3X.

In planetary geology, a scopulus /ˈskɒpjʊləs/ (pl. scopuli /ˈskɒpjʊlaɪ/, from Greek σκόπελος "peak") is a lobate or irregular escarpment. In the early 1970s, the International Astronomical Union (IAU) adopted scopulus as one of a number of official descriptor terms for topographic features on Mars and other planets and satellites. One justification for using neutral Latin or Greek descriptors was that it allowed features to be named and described before their geology or geomorphology could be determined. Currently, the IAU recognizes 54 descriptor terms (see Planetary nomenclature). Thirteen features with the descriptor term scopulus are present on Mars.

== Scopuli on Mars ==
Partial list of scopuli on Mars
Name	Mars coordinates	Quadrangle	Length
Abalos Scopuli	80°43′12″N 283°26′24″E	Mare Boreum quadrangle	109 km
Australe Scopuli	83°28′48″S 247°03′36″E	Mare Australe quadrangle	505 km
Boreales Scopuli	88°52′48″N 269°50′24″E	Mare Boreum quadrangle	1,13 km
Nilokeras Scopulus	31°43′12″N 304°09′00″E	Mare Acidalium quadrangle	901 km
