= Planetary nomenclature =

System of uniquely identifying features on the surface of a planet or natural satellite

Planetary nomenclature, like terrestrial nomenclature, is a system of uniquely identifying features on the surface of a planet or natural satellite so that the features can be easily located, described, and discussed. Since the invention of the telescope, astronomers have given names to the surface features they have discerned, especially on the Moon and Mars. To found an authority on planetary nomenclature, the International Astronomical Union (IAU) was organized in 1919 to designate and standardize names for features on Solar System bodies.

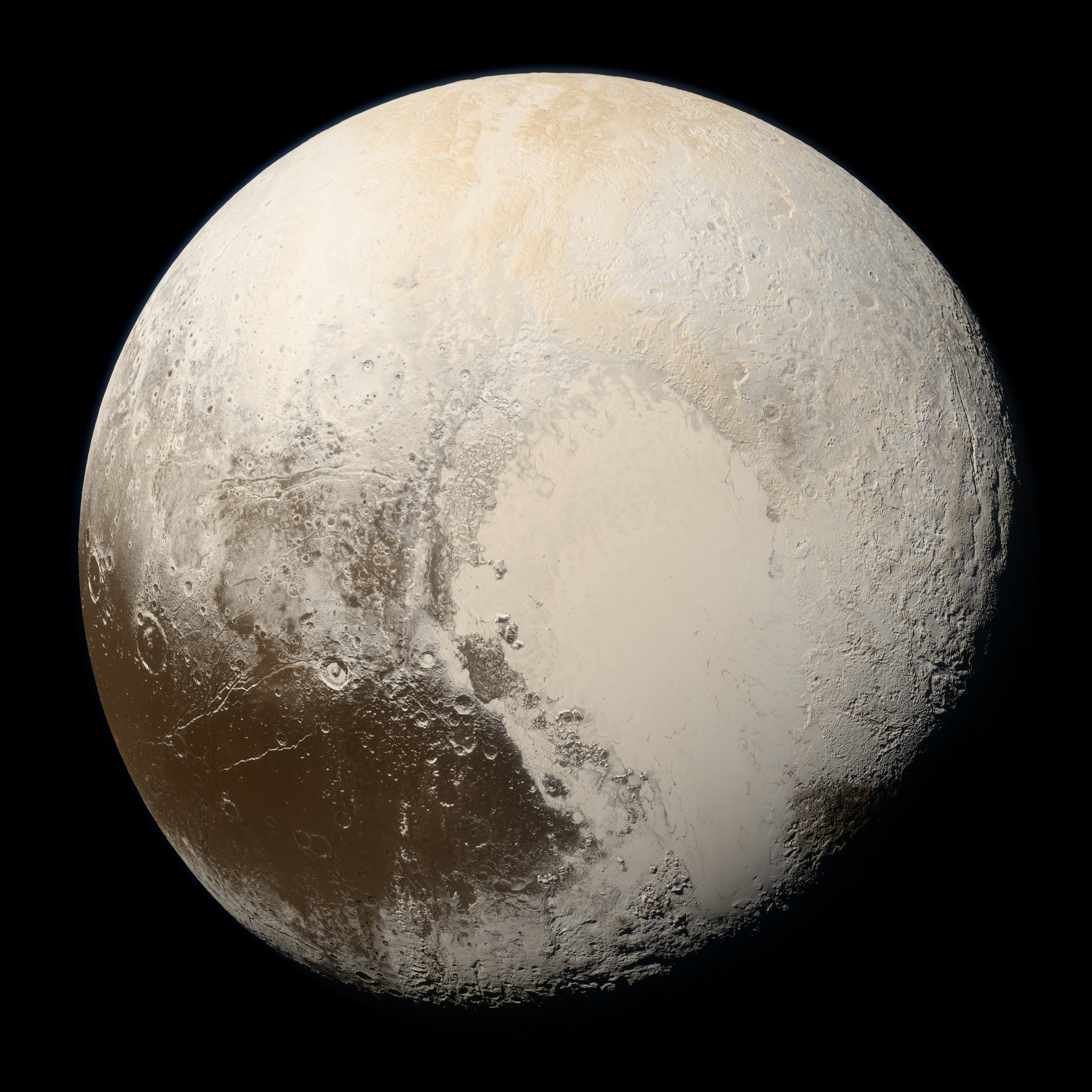
The heart-shaped Tombaugh Regio, on Pluto, is named after the dwarf planet's discoverer Clyde Tombaugh.

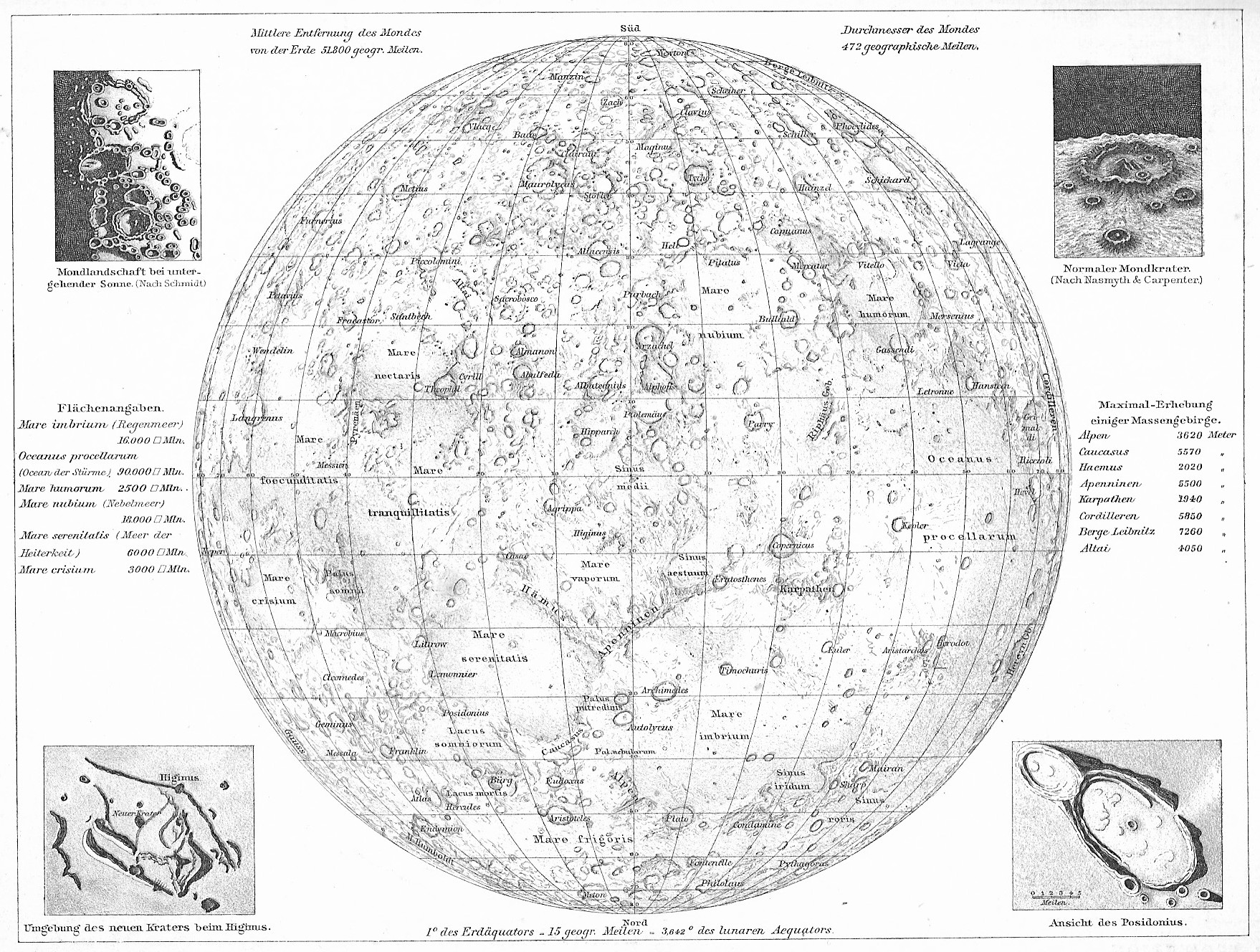
A map of the Moon from Andrees Allgemeiner Handatlas, 1st edition (1881), predating IAU conventions

== IAU approval procedure ==
When images are first obtained of the surface of a planet or satellite, a theme for naming features is chosen and a few important features are named, usually by members of the appropriate IAU task group (a commonly accepted planet-naming group). Later, as higher resolution images and maps become available, additional features are named at the request of investigators mapping or describing specific surfaces, features, or geologic formations. Anyone may suggest that a specific name be considered by a task group. If the members of the task group agree that the name is appropriate, it can be retained for use when there is a request from a member of the scientific community for a name of a specific feature. Names that pass review by a task group are submitted to the IAU Working Group for Planetary System Nomenclature (WGPSN). Once approved by the WGPSN, names are considered official and can be used on maps and in publications. They are also listed in the Gazetteer of Planetary Nomenclature.

== IAU rules and conventions ==
Names adopted by the IAU must follow various rules and conventions established and amended through the years by the Union. These include:

1. Nomenclature is a tool and the first consideration should be to make it simple, clear, and unambiguous.
2. In general, official names will not be given to features whose longest dimensions are less than 100 meters, although exceptions may be made for smaller features having exceptional scientific interest.
3. The number of names chosen for each body should be kept to a minimum. Features should be named only when they have special scientific interest, and when the naming of such features is useful to the scientific and cartographic communities at large.
4. Duplication of the same surface feature name on two or more bodies, and of the same name for satellites and minor planets, is discouraged. Duplications may be allowed when names are especially appropriate and the chances for confusion are very small.
5. Individual names chosen for each body should be expressed in the language of origin. Transliteration for various alphabets should be given, but there will be no translation from one language to another.
6. Where possible, the themes established in early solar system nomenclature should be used and expanded on.
7. Solar system nomenclature should be international in its choice of names. Recommendations submitted to the IAU national committees will be considered, but final selection of the names is the responsibility of the International Astronomical Union. Where appropriate, the WGPSN strongly supports an equitable selection of names from ethnic groups, countries, and gender on each map; however, a higher percentage of names from the country planning a landing is allowed on landing site maps.
8. No names having political, military or (modern) religious significance may be used, except for names of political figures prior to the 19th century.
9. Commemoration of persons on planetary bodies should not normally be a goal in itself, but may be employed in special circumstances and is reserved for persons of high and enduring international standing. Persons being so honored must have been deceased for at least three years.
10. When more than one spelling of a name is extant, the spelling preferred by the person, or used in an authoritative reference, should be used. Diacritical marks are a necessary part of a name and will be used.
11. Ring and ring-gap nomenclature and names for newly discovered satellites are developed in joint deliberation between WGPSN and IAU Commission 20. Names will not be assigned to satellites until their orbital elements are reasonably well known or definite features have been identified on them.
12. Accessible and authoritative sources, including Internet sources, are required for adopted names. Wikipedia is not sufficient as a source, but may be useful for identifying appropriate sources.

In addition to these general rules, each task group develops additional conventions as it formulates an interesting and meaningful nomenclature for individual planetary bodies.

== Naming conventions ==
Names for all planetary features include a descriptor term, with the exception of two feature types. For craters, the descriptor term is implicit. Some features named on Io and Triton do not carry a descriptor term because they are ephemeral.

In general, the naming convention for a feature type remains the same regardless of its size. Exceptions to this rule are valleys and craters on Mars and Venus; naming conventions for these features differ according to size.

One feature classification, regio, was originally used on early maps of the Moon and Mercury (drawn from telescopic observations) to describe vague albedo features. It is now used to delineate a broad geographic region.

Named features on bodies so small that coordinates have not yet been determined are identified on drawings of the body that are included in the IAU Transactions volume of the year when the names were adopted. Satellite rings and gaps in the rings are named for scientists who have studied these features; drawings that show these names are also included in the pertinent Transactions volume. Names for atmospheric features are informal at present; a formal system will be chosen in the future.

The boundaries of many large features (such as terrae, regiones, planitiae and plana) are not topographically or geomorphically distinct; the coordinates of these features are identified from an arbitrarily chosen center point. Boundaries (and thus coordinates) may be determined more accurately from geochemical and geophysical data obtained by future missions.

During active missions, small surface features are often given informal names. These may include landing sites, spacecraft impact sites, and small topographic features, such as craters, hills, and rocks. Such names will not be given official status by the IAU, except as provided for by Rule 2 above. As for the larger objects, official names for any such small features would have to conform to established IAU rules and categories.

== Descriptor terms (feature types) ==
Feature	Pronunciation (Note: Listed pronunciations are conventional or follow the traditional English pronunciation of Latin words. However, some speakers use different (often variable) pronunciations that are closer to the Latin or Greek.)	Description	Designation
Albedo feature	/ælˈbiːdoʊ/	An area which shows a contrast in brightness or darkness (albedo) with adjacent areas. This term is implicit.	AL
Arcus, arcūs	/ˈɑːrkəs/	Arc: curved feature	AR
Astrum, astra	/ˈæstrəm/, /ˈæstrə/	Radial-patterned features, currently not used for any official surface features	AS
Catena, catenae	/kəˈtiːnə/, /kəˈtiːniː/	A chain of craters e.g. Enki Catena.	CA
Cavus, cavi	/ˈkeɪvəs/, /ˈkeɪvaɪ/	Hollows, irregular steep-sided depressions usually in arrays or clusters	CB
Chaos, chaoses	/ˈkeɪɒs/	A distinctive area of broken or jumbled terrain e.g. Iani Chaos.	CH
Chasma, chasmata	/ˈkæzmə/, /ˈkæzmətə/	Deep, elongated, steep-sided depression e.g. Eos Chasma.	CM
Collis, colles	/ˈkɒlɪs/, /ˈkɒliːz/	A small hill or knob.	CO
Collum, colli	/ˈkɒləm/, /ˈkɒliː/	A thin section between the two lobes of a contact binary, only used on Arrokoth and Donaldjohanson	CL
Corona, coronae	/kɒˈroʊnə/, /kɒˈroʊniː/	An oval feature. Used only on Venus and Miranda.	CR
Crater, craters	/ˈkreɪtər/	A circular depression (in most cases created by impact event). This term is implicit.	AA
Dorsum, dorsa	/ˈdɔːrsəm/, /ˈdɔːrsə/	Ridge, sometimes called a wrinkle ridge e.g. Dorsum Buckland.	DO
Eruptive center		An active volcano on Io. This term is implicit.	ER
Facula, faculae	/ˈfækjʊlə/, /ˈfækjʊliː/	Bright spot	FA
Farrum, farra	/ˈfærəm/, /ˈfærə/	Pancake-like structure, or a row of such structures. Used only on Venus.	FR
Flexus, flexūs	/ˈflɛksəs/	Very low curvilinear ridge with a scalloped pattern	FE
Fluctus, fluctūs	/ˈflʌktəs/, /flʌkˈtuːs/	Terrain covered by outflow of liquid. Used on Venus, Io, Titan, and Mars.	FL
Flumen, flumina	/ˈfluːmɪn/, /ˈfluːmɪnə/	Channel on Titan that might carry liquid	FM
Fossa, fossae	/ˈfɒsə/, /ˈfɒsiː/	Long, narrow, shallow depression	FO
Fretum, freta	/ˈfriːtəm/, /ˈfriːtə/	Strait of liquid connecting two larger areas of liquid. Used only on Titan.	FT
Insula, insulae	/ˈɪnsjuːlə/, /ˈɪnsjuːliː/	Island (islands), an isolated land area (or group of such areas) surrounded by, or nearly surrounded by, a liquid area (sea or lake). Used only on Titan.	IN
Labes, labēs	/ˈleɪbɪs/, /ˈleɪbiːz/	Landslide debris. Used only on Mars and Ceres.	LA
Labyrinthus, labyrinthi	/læbɪˈrɪnθəs/, /læbɪˈrɪnθaɪ/	Complex of intersecting valleys or ridges.	LB
Lacuna, lacunae	/ləˈkjuːnə/, /ləˈkjuːniː/	Irregularly shaped depression having the appearance of a dry lake bed. Used only on Titan.	LU
Lacus, lacūs	/ˈleɪkəs/	A "lake" or small plain on Moon and Mars; on Titan, a "true lake" of dark liquid hydrocarbons or a small, dark plain with discrete, sharp boundaries; on Pluto, a small isolated glacier	LC
Landing site name		Lunar features at or near Apollo landing sites	LF
Large ringed feature		Cryptic ringed features	LG
Lenticula, lenticulae	/lɛnˈtɪkjʊlə/, /lɛnˈtɪkjʊliː/	Small dark spots on Europa	LE
Linea, lineae	/ˈlɪniːə/, /ˈlɪniːiː/	Dark or bright elongate marking, may be curved or straight	LI
Lingula, lingulae	/ˈlɪŋɡjʊlə/, /ˈlɪŋɡjʊliː/	Extension of plateau having rounded lobate or tongue-like boundaries	LN
Lobus		Lobes of contact binaries. Currently used only on Arrokoth, Selam, and Donaldjohanson	LO
Macula, maculae	/ˈmækjʊlə/, /ˈmækjʊliː/	Dark spot, may be irregular	MA
Mare, maria	/ˈmɑːriː, -eɪ/, /ˈmɑːriə/	A "sea": on the Moon, a low albedo, relatively smooth plain, generally of large extent; on Mars, dark albedo area, e.g. Mare Erythraeum; on Titan, large expanses of dark materials thought to be liquid hydrocarbons, e.g. Ligeia Mare.	ME
Mensa, mensae	/ˈmɛnsə/, /ˈmɛnsiː/	A flat-topped prominence with cliff-like edges, i.e. a mesa.	MN
Mons, montes	/ˈmɒnz/, /ˈmɒntiːz/	Mons refers to a mountain. Montes refers to a mountain range, e.g. Olympus Mons, Maxwell Montes.	MO
Oceanus	/oʊˈsiːənəs/	Very large dark area. The only feature with this designation is Oceanus Procellarum.	OC
Palus, paludes	/ˈpeɪləs/, /pəˈljuːdiːz/	"Swamp"; small plain. Used on the Moon, Mars, and Pluto.	PA
Patera, paterae	/ˈpætərə/, /ˈpætəriː/	Irregular crater, or a complex one with scalloped edges e.g. Ah Peku Patera. Usually refers to the dish-shaped depression atop a volcano.	PE
Planitia, planitiae	/pləˈnɪʃə/, /pləˈnɪʃiː/	Low plain e.g. Amazonis Planitia, Isidis Planitia.	PL
Planum, plana	/ˈpleɪnəm/, /ˈpleɪnə/	A plateau or high plain e.g. Planum Boreum, Lakshmi Planum.	PM
Plume, plumes	/ˈpluːm/	A cryovolcanic feature on Triton. This term is currently unused.	PU
Promontorium, promontoria	/prɒmənˈtɔːriəm/, /prɒmənˈtɔːriə/	"Cape"; headland. Used only on the Moon.	PR
Regio, regiones	/ˈriːdʒioʊ/, /rɛdʒiˈoʊniːz/	Large area marked by reflectivity or color distinctions from adjacent areas, or a broad geographic region	RE
Reticulum, reticula	/rɪˈtɪkjʊləm/, /rɪˈtɪkjʊlə/	reticular (netlike) patterns, currently not used for any official surface features	RT
Rima, rimae	/ˈraɪmə/, /ˈraɪmiː/	Fissure. Used only on the Moon and 21 Lutetia.	RI
Rupes, rupēs	/ˈruːpɪs/, /ˈruːpiːz/	Scarp	RU
Satellite feature		A feature that shares the name of an associated feature, for example Hertzsprung D.	SF
Saxum, saxa	/ˈsæksəm/, /ˈsæksə/	Boulder or rock	SA
Scopulus, scopuli	/ˈskɒpjʊlə/, /ˈskɒpjʊlaɪ/	Lobate or irregular scarp	SC
Serpens, serpentes	/ˈsɜːrpənz/, /sərˈpɛntiːz/	Sinuous feature with segments of positive and negative relief along its length	SE
Sinus, sinūs	/ˈsaɪnəs/	"Bay"; small plain on Moon or Mars, e.g. Sinus Meridiani; On Titan, bay within bodies of liquid.	SI
Sulcus, sulci	/ˈsʌlkəs/, /ˈsʌlsaɪ/	Subparallel furrows and ridges	SU
Terra, terrae	/ˈtɛrə/, /ˈtɛriː/	Extensive land mass e.g. Arabia Terra, Aphrodite Terra.	TA
Tessera, tesserae	/ˈtɛsərə/, /ˈtɛsəriː/	An area of tile-like, polygonal terrain. This term is used only on Venus.	TE
Tholus, tholi	/ˈθoʊləs/, /ˈθoʊlaɪ/	Small domical mountain or hill e.g. Hecates Tholus.	TH
Undae, undae	/ˈʌndiː/	A field of dunes. Used on Venus, Mars and Titan.	UN
Vallis, valles	/ˈvælɪs/, /ˈvæliːz/	A valley e.g. Valles Marineris.	VA
Vastitas, vastitates	/ˈvæstɪtəs/, /væstɪˈteɪtiːz/	An extensive plain. The only feature with this designation is Vastitas Borealis.	VS
Virga, virgae	/ˈvɜːrɡə/, /ˈvɜːrdʒiː/	A streak or stripe of color. This term is currently used only on Titan.	VI

== Categories for naming features on planets and satellites ==
=== Mercury ===
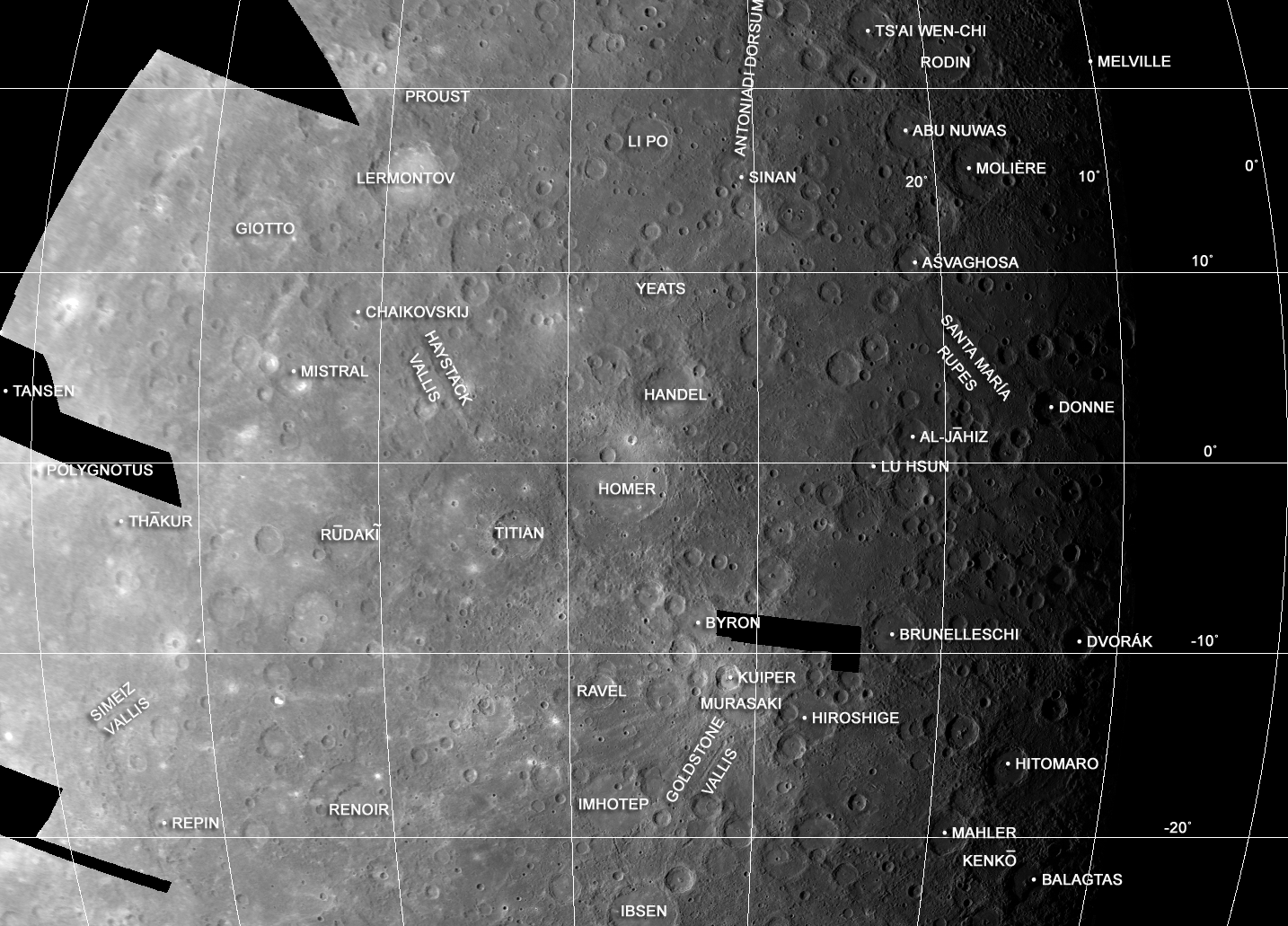
Examples of Mercurian nomenclature from the Kuiper quadrangle.

Feature type	Current list	Naming convention
Catenae	list	Radio telescope facilities
Craters	list	Famous deceased artists, musicians, painters, authors
Dorsa	list	Astronomers who made detailed studies of the planet
Facula	list	The word 'snake' in various languages
Fossae	list	Significant works of architecture
Montes	list	Words for "hot" in various languages. Only one mountain range is currently named: Caloris Montes, from Latin word for "heat"
Planitiae	list	Names for Mercury (either planet or god) in various languages. Two exceptions exist.
Rupēs	list	Ships of discovery or scientific expeditions
Valles	list	Abandoned cities, towns or settlements of antiquity

=== Venus ===
All but three features on Venus are named after female personages (goddesses and historical or mythological women). These three exceptions were named before the convention was adopted, being respectively Alpha Regio, Beta Regio, and Maxwell Montes which is named after James Clerk Maxwell.

Feature type	Current list	Naming convention
Astra	none	Goddesses, miscellaneous
Chasmata	list	Goddesses of hunt; moon goddesses
Colles	list	Sea goddesses
Coronae	list	Fertility and earth goddesses
Craters	list	Over 20 km, famous women; under 20 km, common female first names
Dorsa	list	Sky goddesses
Farra	list	Water goddesses
Fluctūs	list	Goddesses, miscellaneous
Fossae	list	Goddesses of war
Labyrinthi	list	Goddesses, miscellaneous
Lineae	list	Goddesses of war
Montes	list	Goddesses, miscellaneous (also one radar scientist)
Paterae	list	Famous women
Planitiae	list	Mythological heroines
Plana	list	Goddesses of prosperity
Regiones	list	Giantesses and Titanesses (also two Greek alphanumeric)
Rupēs	list	Goddesses of hearth and home
Terrae	list	Goddesses of love
Tesserae	list	Goddesses of fate and fortune
Tholi	list	Goddesses, miscellaneous
Undae	list	Desert goddesses
Valles	list	Word for planet Venus in various world languages (400 km and longer); river goddesses (less than 400 km in length)

=== The Moon ===
Feature type	Naming convention
Craters	Craters are generally named after deceased scientists, scholars, artists and explorers who have made outstanding or fundamental contributions to their field. Additionally, craters in or around Mare Moscoviense are named after deceased Russian cosmonauts and craters in and around Apollo crater are named after deceased American astronauts (see Space accidents and incidents). This convention may be extended if other space-faring countries suffer fatalities in spaceflight.
Lacūs, Maria, Paludes, Sinūs	These features are assigned names which are Latin terms describing weather and other abstract concepts.
Montes	Montes are named after terrestrial mountain ranges or nearby craters.
Rupēs	Rupēs are named after nearby mountain ranges (see above).
Valles	Valles are named after nearby features.
Others	Features that don't fall into any of the above categories are named after nearby craters.

=== Mars and martian satellites ===
==== Mars ====
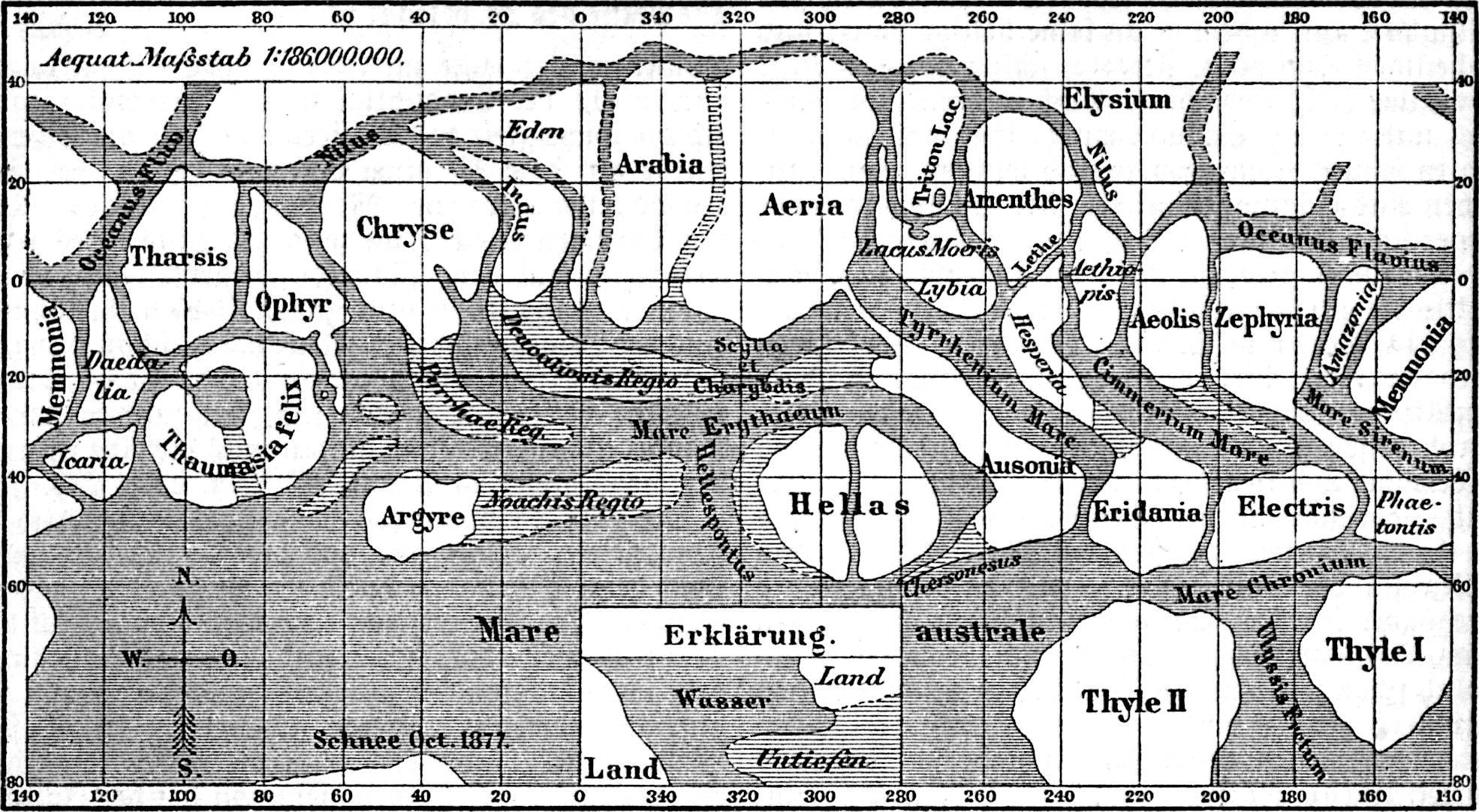
Early map of Mars by Giovanni Schiaparelli, which depicts classical albedo features

Feature type	Naming convention
Large craters	Deceased scientists who have contributed to the study of Mars; writers and others who have contributed to the lore of Mars
Small craters	Villages of the world with a population of less than 100,000.
Large valles	Name for Mars/star in various languages
Small valles	Classical or modern names of rivers
Other features	From nearest named albedo feature on Schiaparelli or Antoniadi maps. See Classical albedo features on Mars for a list.

When space probes have landed on Mars, individual small features such as rocks, dunes, and hollows have often been given informal names. Many of these are frivolous: features have been named after ice cream (such as Cookies N Cream); cartoon characters (such as SpongeBob SquarePants and Patrick); and 1970s music acts (such as ABBA and the Bee Gees).

==== Deimos ====
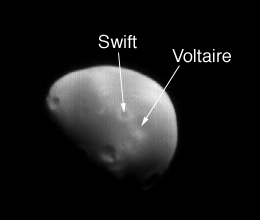
The two named craters on Deimos

Features on Deimos are named after authors who wrote about Martian satellites. There are currently two named features on Deimos – Swift crater and Voltaire crater – after Jonathan Swift and Voltaire who predicted the presence of Martian moons.

==== Phobos ====
All features on Phobos are named after scientists involved with the discovery, dynamics, or properties of the Martian satellites or people and places from Jonathan Swift's Gulliver's Travels.

=== Satellites of Jupiter ===
==== Amalthea ====
People and places associated with the Amalthea myth.

==== Thebe ====
Features on Thebe are named after people and places associated with the Thebe myth. There is only one named feature on Thebe – Zethus Crater.

==== Io ====
Feature type	Naming convention
Active eruptive centers	Active volcanoes on Io are named after fire, sun or thunder gods or heroes.
Catenae	Crater chains are named after Sun gods.
Fluctūs	Names of fluctūs are derived from a nearby named feature, fire, sun, thunder or volcano gods, goddesses and heroes or mythical blacksmiths.
Mensae, Montes, Plana, Regiones and Tholi	These features can be named after places associated with Io mythology, derived from nearby named features, or places from Dante's Inferno
Paterae	Paterae on Io are named after fire, sun, thunder or volcano gods, heroes or goddesses or mythical blacksmiths.
Valles	Names of valleys are derived from nearby named features.

==== Europa ====
Feature type	Naming convention
Chaos	Places associated with Celtic myths
Craters	Celtic gods and heroes
Flexūs	Places associated with the Europa myth
Large ringed features	Celtic stone circles
Lenticulae	Celtic gods and heroes
Lineae	People associated with the Europa myth
Maculae	Places associated with the Europa myth
Regiones	Places associated with Celtic myths

==== Ganymede ====
Feature type	Naming convention
Catenae, craters	Gods and heroes of ancient Middle Eastern civilizations
Faculae	Places associated with Egyptian myths
Fossae	Gods (or principals) of ancient Fertile Crescent people
Paterae	Paterae on Ganymede are named after wadis in the Middle East.
Regiones	Astronomers who discovered Jovian satellites
Sulci	Places associated with myths of ancient people

==== Callisto ====
Feature type	Naming convention
Large ringed features	Homes of the gods and of heroes
Craters	Heroes and heroines from northern myths
Catenae	Mythological places in high latitudes

=== Satellites of Saturn ===
==== Janus ====
People from myth of Castor and Pollux (twins)

==== Epimetheus ====
People from myth of Castor and Pollux (twins)

==== Mimas ====
People and places from Malory's Le Morte d'Arthur legends (Baines translation)

==== Enceladus ====
People and places from Burton's Arabian Nights

==== Tethys ====
People and places from Homer's Odyssey

==== Dione ====
Locations from Roman mythology, or people and places from Virgil's Aeneid

==== Rhea ====
People and places from creation myths

==== Titan ====
Feature type	Naming convention
Albedo features, terrae	Sacred or enchanted places, paradise, or celestial realms from legends, myths, stories, and poems of cultures from around the world
Colles	Names of characters from Middle-earth, the fictional setting in fantasy novels by English author J.R.R. Tolkien (1892–1973)
Craters and ringed features	Gods and goddesses of wisdom
Facula and faculae	Facula: Names of islands on Earth that are not politically independent, Faculae: Names of archipelagos
Fluctūs	Gods and goddesses of beauty
Flumina	Names of mythical or imaginary rivers
Freta	Names of characters from the Foundation series of science fiction novels by American author Isaac Asimov (1920–1992)
Insulae	Names of islands from legends and myths
Lacūs and lacunae	Lakes on Earth, preferably with a shape similar to the lacus or lacuna on Titan
Mare and maria	Sea creatures from myth and literature
Montes	Names of mountains and peaks from Middle-earth, the fictional setting in fantasy novels by English author J.R.R. Tolkien (1892–1973)
Planitiae and labyrinthi	Names of planets from the Dune series of science fiction novels by American author Frank Herbert (1920–1986)
Sinūs	Names of terrestrial bays, coves, fjords or other inlets
Undae	Gods and goddesses of wind
Virgae	Gods and goddesses of rain

==== Hyperion ====
Sun and Moon deities

==== Iapetus ====
People and places from Sayers' translation of Chanson de Roland; the only exception is Cassini Regio, which is named after its discoverer, Giovanni Cassini.

==== Phoebe ====
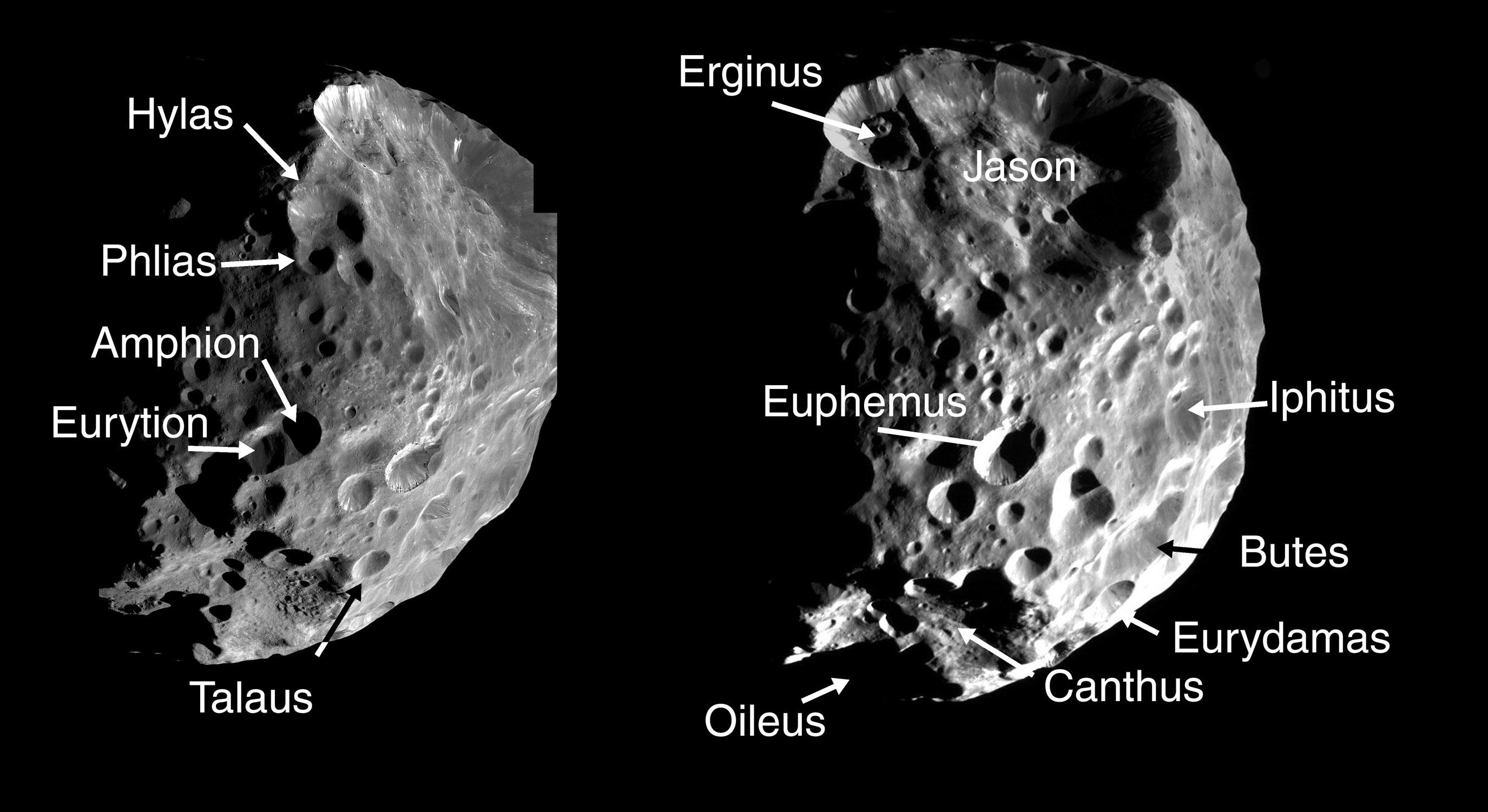
Examples of crater nomenclature on Phoebe

Feature type	Naming convention
Craters	Craters of Phoebe are named after people associated with Phoebe or people from Argonautica by Apollonius Rhodius or Gaius Valerius Flaccus.
Other	Non-crater features on Phoebe are named after places from Argonautica.

=== Satellites of Uranus ===
Satellites of Uranus are named for characters from the works of William Shakespeare or from The Rape of the Lock.

==== Puck ====
Mischievous (Pucklike) spirits (class)

==== Miranda ====
Male Shakespearean characters, places

==== Ariel ====
Light spirits (individual and class)

==== Umbriel ====
Dark spirits (individual)

==== Titania ====
Female Shakespearean characters, places

==== Oberon ====
Shakespearean tragic heroes and places

==== Small satellites ====
There are currently no named features on Uranian small satellites, however the naming convention is heroines from plays by Shakespeare and Pope.

=== Satellites of Neptune ===
==== Proteus ====
Features on Proteus are to be named after water-related spirits, gods or goddesses who are neither Greek nor Roman. The only named feature on Proteus is crater Pharos.

==== Triton ====
Geological features on Triton should be assigned aquatic names, excluding those which are Roman and Greek in origin. Possible themes for individual descriptor terms include worldwide aquatic spirits, famous terrestrial fountains or fountain locations, terrestrial aquatic features, famous terrestrial geysers or geyser locations and terrestrial islands.

==== Nereid ====
There are currently no named features on Nereid. When features are discovered, they are to be named after individual nereids.

==== Small satellites ====
Features on other satellites of Neptune, once discovered, should be named after gods and goddesses associated with Neptune/Poseidon mythology or generic mythological aquatic beings.

=== Pluto and satellites ===
Formally and informally named geographic features on Pluto

In February 2017, the IAU approved the following themes for surface features on Pluto and its satellites:

==== Pluto ====
- Gods, goddesses, and other beings associated with the Underworld from mythology, folklore and literature.
- Names for the Underworld and for Underworld locales from mythology, folklore and literature.
- Heroes and other explorers of the Underworld.
- Scientists and engineers associated with Pluto and the Kuiper Belt.
- Pioneering space missions and spacecraft.
- Historic pioneers who crossed new horizons in the exploration of the Earth, sea and sky.

==== Charon ====
- Destinations and milestones of fictional space and other exploration.
- Fictional and mythological vessels of space and other exploration.
- Fictional and mythological voyagers, travellers and explorers.
- Authors and artists associated with space exploration, especially Pluto and the Kuiper Belt.

==== Nix ====
- Deities of the night.

==== Hydra ====
- Legendary serpents and dragons.

==== Kerberos ====
- Dogs from literature, mythology, and history.

==== Styx ====
- River gods.

=== Asteroids ===
==== 1 Ceres ====
Feature type	Naming convention
Craters	Agricultural deities
other	Agricultural festivals

==== 4 Vesta ====
Feature type	Naming convention
Craters	Historical and mythological women of Ancient Rome (in one case, Angioletta, a modern-day female scientist who lived in Rome)
other	Festivals of Ancient Rome

==== 243 Ida ====
Feature type	Naming convention
Craters	Caverns and grottos of the world
Dorsa	Galileo project participants
Regiones	Discoverer of Ida and places associated with the discoverer

==== (243) Ida I Dactyl ====
Feature type	Naming convention
Craters	Idaean dactyls

==== 951 Gaspra ====
Feature type	Naming convention
Craters	Spas of the world
Regiones	Discoverer of Gaspra, and Galileo project participants

==== 253 Mathilde ====
Feature type	Naming convention
Craters	Coal fields and basins of the world

==== 433 Eros ====
Feature type	Naming convention
Craters	Mythological, literary, and historical names of lovers
Regiones	Discoverers of Eros
Dorsa	Scientists who have contributed to the exploration and study of Eros

== See also ==
- Astronomical naming conventions
- Lists of geological features of the Solar System
- List of adjectivals and demonyms of astronomical bodies
- Naming of moons
- Selenography
- Toponymy, the scientific study of place-names (toponyms), their origins, meanings, use and typology.
