= Ovda Regio =

Venusian plateau

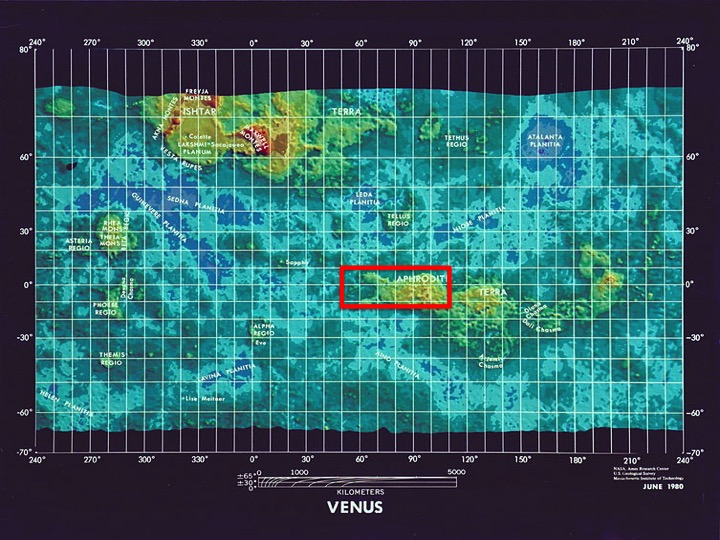
- The red rectangle shows the approximate location of Ovda Regio on the western part of Aphrodite Terra.
- Feature type: Regio
- Coordinates: 10°N to 15°S and 50°E to 110°E
- Surface area: 15,000,000 square kilometres
- Eponym: Marijian forest spirit

Ovda Regio is a Venusian crustal plateau located near the equator in the western highland region of Aphrodite Terra that stretches from 10°N to 15°S and 50°E to 110°E. Known as the largest crustal plateau in Venus, the regio covers an area of approximately 15,000,000 square kilometres (5,800,000 mi^{2}) and is bounded by regional plains to the north, Salus Tessera to the west, Thetis Regio to the east, and Kuanja as well as Ix Chel chasmata to the south. The crustal plateau serves as a place to hold the localized tessera terrains in the planet, which makes up roughly 8% of Venus' surface area. The kinematic evolution of crustal plateaus on Venus has been a debated topic in the planetary science community. Understanding its complex evolution is expected to contribute to a better knowledge of the geodynamic history of Venus. It is named after a Marijian forest spirit that can appear as both male and female.

== Structural geology ==
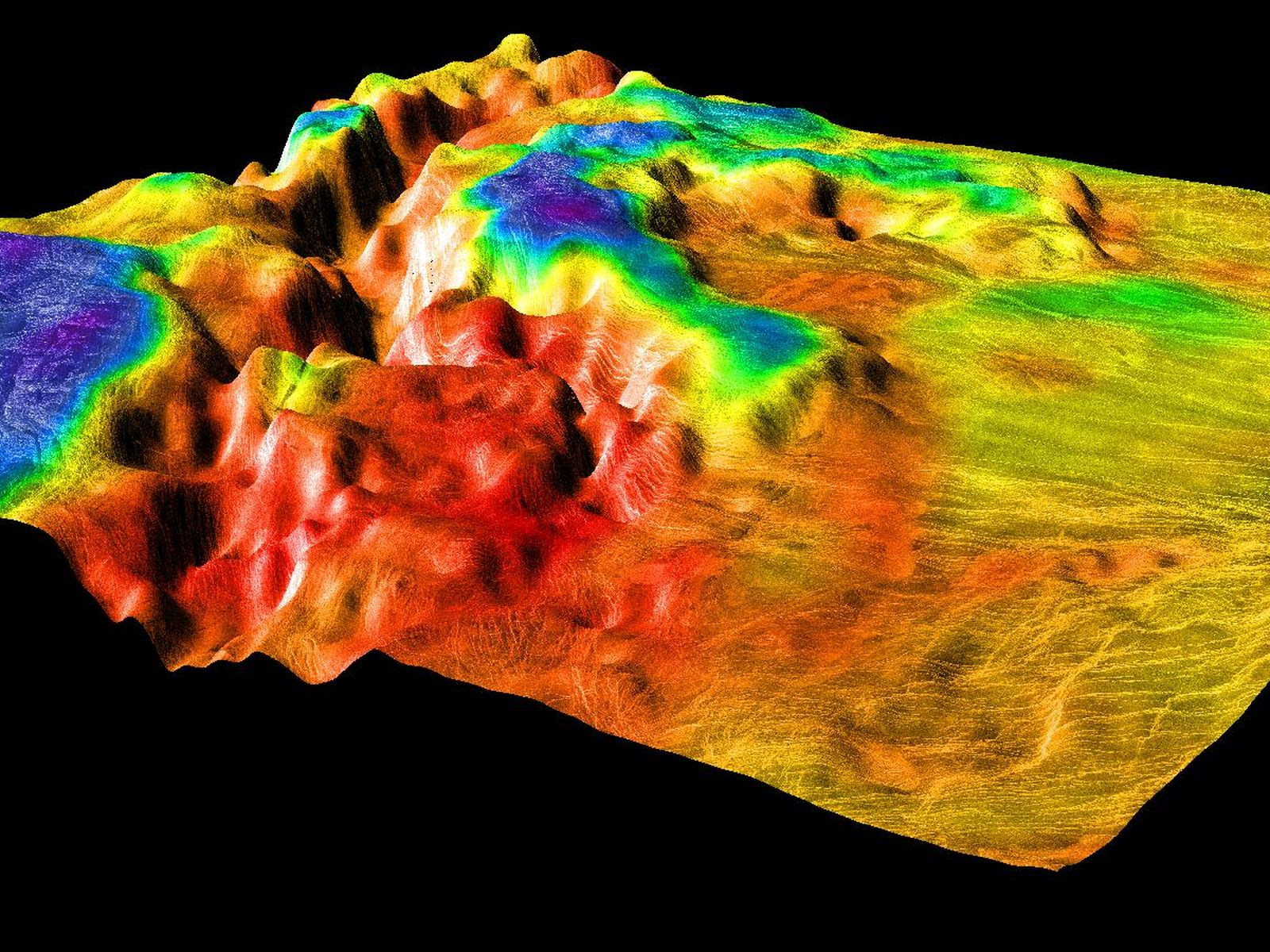
This 3D view depicts the border between the lowland plains on the right and the crustal plateau region of Ovda Regio on the left

Extensive research has been conducted to describe the structural geology of Ovda Regio. Synthetic aperture radar (SAR) images from the NASA Magellan mission have been analyzed to recognize the distribution of its structural features. The distribution was then mapped to find its temporal and spatial relation to find insight into the Regio's deformation and formation mechanisms. The challenge in this process is to find the ideal temporal and spatial relationships, which hold a prominent role in comprehending the tectonic processes. In terms of structural setting, the Regio is characterized mainly by ribbons, folds, and a complex of graben.

=== Western Ovda ===
Folds and a distinct compositional layering generally characterize the western part of Ovda Regio. Compositional layering means that the structural layers differ from each other in terms of their chemical compositions. In particular, the layers are differentiated based on their tone and textural recognition from SAR images. The folds observed in this part of the Regio are concentric, associated with plunges, and share a common axis that is trending in an east–west fashion. Another feature that is observed in this part is ribbons structures. Ribbons can be described as structures that are steep with long depression of about 1–3 km in width and shallow depths of less than 500 m. In contrast to the folding structures, the ribbons in the western part are randomly distributed.

=== Central Ovda ===
Visible light footage from the nightside of Venus, showing the hot faintly glowing surface through the clouds, which is otherwise obscured on the dayside by the highly reflective cloud layer of Venus. The Ovda Regio is the large dark patch.

Central Ovda is distinguishable by ridges exhibiting east–west orientations similar to those of western Ovda. These ridges are common on the northern margin and often share a common axis with the fold structures. Other structural features observed in this part of Ovda are imbricate stack and duplex formation on the southern margin. A more detailed analysis was conducted in this part indicate that central Ovda hosts a strike-slip tectonic regime where the deformation is accompanied by three different structures: folds, normal faults, and strike-slip faults.

=== Eastern Ovda ===
In the eastern part of Ovda, the structural setting is defined mainly by wide folds and ribbons structures. The wide folds are observed to have amplitudes up to 25 km and several hundred km in length. While the ribbons structures generally hold a radial pattern. Some of the ribbons structures on this part of Ovda are quite difficult to interpret due to the SAR images' limited resolution. A good number of grabens are also present in this part, although the grabens are not highly distinguishable and are limited to fold crests.

== Kinematic evolution ==
There are a few ideas being continuously discussed in the planetary science community regarding the tectonic evolution of Ovda Regio:

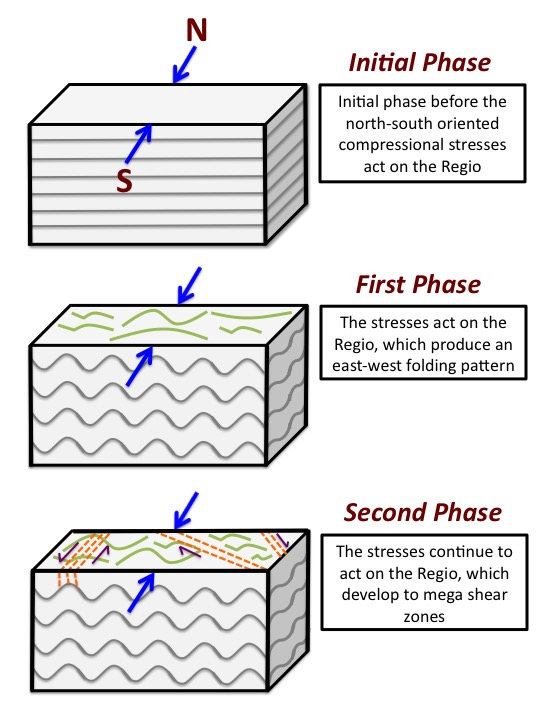
The regional tectonic evolution at Ovda Regio. Modified from Chetty et al., 2010.

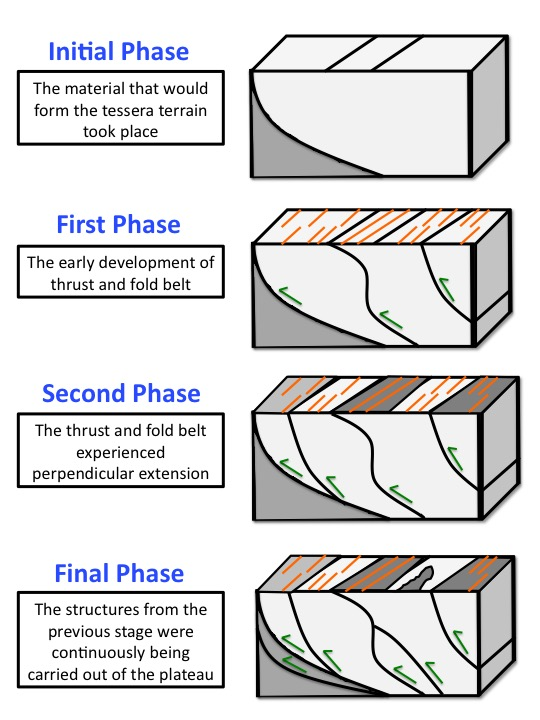
The tectonic evolution at the crustal plateau's margins of Ovda Regio. Modified from Romeo and Capote, 2010.

=== Regional kinematic evolution ===
Regionally, there are two separate phases of tectonic evolution. Initially, the Regio was at a stable state where there are no stresses acting on the crustal plateaus. This state was then followed by the first phase in which the north–south-oriented compressional stresses acted on the Regio and produced an east–west folding pattern. This pattern provides the primary structural framework in Ovda Regio. Then, the second phase took place in which the compressional stresses intensified and developed significant mega shear zones.

=== Marginal kinematic evolution ===
There are generally two different phases of structural evolution that describe the Regio's crustal plateau margins. The initial phase preceded the first phase and the last phase concluded the second phase. The initial phase was when all the material being set in place, which would then construct the tessera terrain. During the first phase, the thrust faults and fold belts started to develop parallel to the margins. At the beginning of the first phase, these faults and folds made an impact on the tessera terrain, but later on it made an impact on the intratessera volcanic plains. On second phase, all the thrust faults and fold belts experienced a perpendicular extension. Furthermore, the last phase occurred when the extensional events continuously carried out the deformed structures from the plateau and affecting the volcanic units.

== Dynamic development ==
There are several models that have been debated to explain crustal plateau formation in Venus, particularly in Ovda Regio:

=== Downwelling model ===
This model describes that the mantle downwelling flow assisted the development of crustal thickening and shortening of the ductile crust because of compression and accretion of thin lithosphere. However, this model needs a lot amount of time of crustal thickening (1–4 billion years). There are also a few constraints for this model. The first one is that this model provides no explanation for the contractional structures and the second one is that the timing of the extensional structures does not correlate well with the known cross-cutting relationships.

=== Upwelling model ===
This second model describes the upwelling of a mantle flow (plume) that accommodates the formation of crustal thickening by magmatic underplating and volcanic activities associated with the thin lithosphere. Planetary scientists that support this model identify two categories of extensional structures: long-narrow graben, referred to as a ribbons, and more widely spaced graben. The sequence of formation for these structures is still debatable. Some scientists believe that the ribbons were formed first, followed later on by the wide spaced graben. But there are other scientists who believe the reverse sequence.

=== Impact model ===
Under the impact model, the crustal plateaus were formed by lava ponds from mantle melting due to meteor impacts to the planet's thin lithosphere. Based on this model, the crustal plateaus would be uplifted by isostasy because the mantle underneath the lava ponds are depleted with residual melts as compared to the neighboring undepleted mantle. However, there are a few issues accompanying this model. The first issue is that scientists are not confident that meteor impacts have the capabilities to melt a significant portion of the planet's lithosphere and generate enough magma that would cause isostasy. The second issue is the planet's large folds need a high amount of stresses to pass the thin brittle layer, but the underlying magma is not capable of transferring enough stresses through the layer.

== See also ==
- Alpha Regio
- Asteria Regio
- Beta Regio
