= Alpha Regio =

Region of the planet Venus

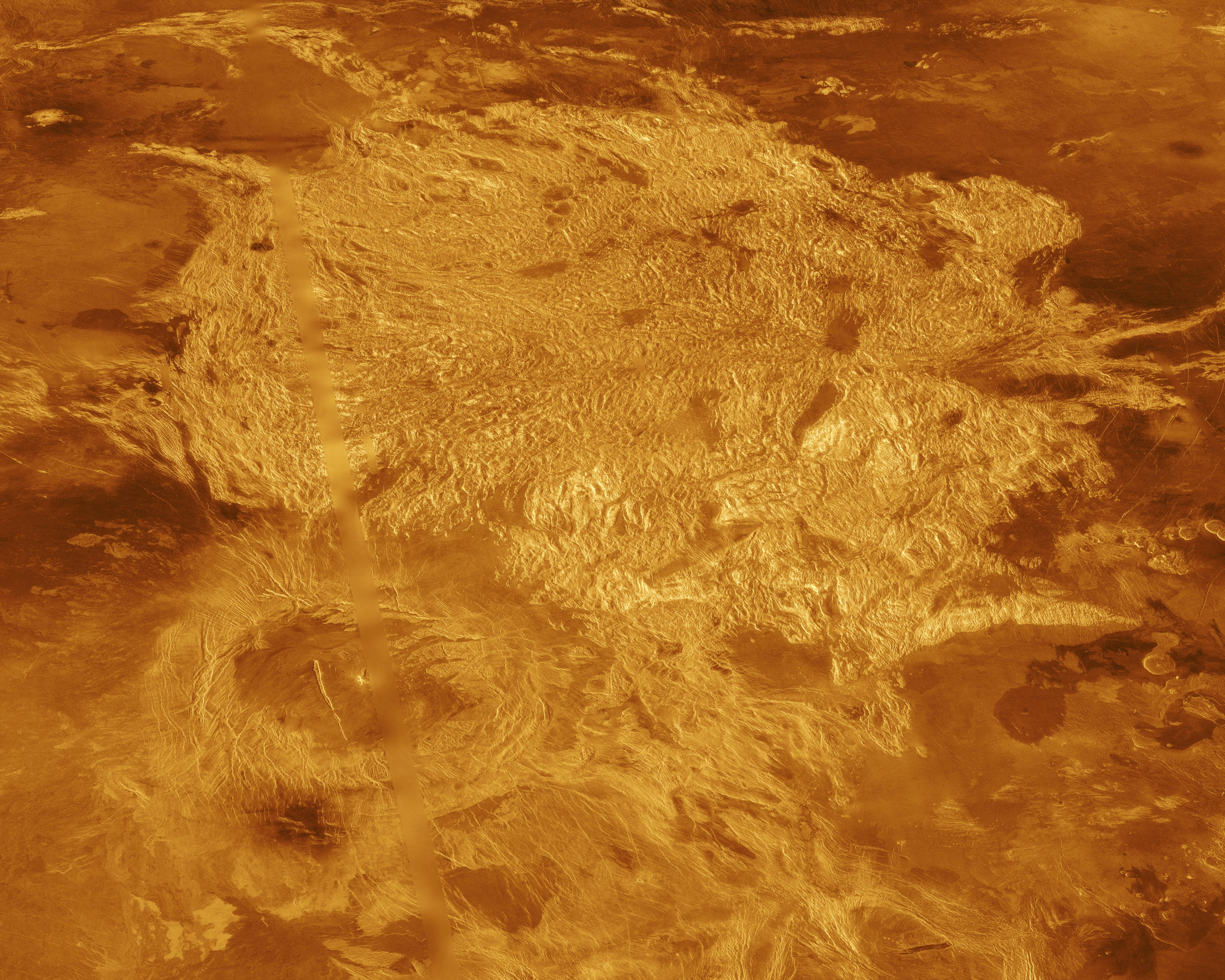
- A portion of Alpha Regio is displayed in this three-dimensional perspective view of the surface of Venus.
- Feature type: Regio
- Coordinates: 22°S 5°E
- Diameter: 1500 km
- Eponym: First letter in Greek alphabet

Alpha Regio is a region of the planet Venus extending for about 1500 kilometers centered at 22°S, 5°E.

It was discovered and named by Richard Goldstein in 1964, which was named after the first letter in the Greek alphabet. The name was approved by the International Astronomical Union's Working Group for Planetary System Nomenclature (IAU/WGPSN) between 1976 and 1979. Maxwell Montes, Alpha Regio, and Beta Regio are the three exceptions to the rule that the surface features of Venus are to be named for females: women or goddesses.

The surface of the region is what is known as Tessera, meaning a terrain that has been highly deformed and where the deformation strikes in multiple directions and is closely spaced. The term comes from the Greek word for “tiled” (Russian investigators analyzing Venera 15 and Venera 16 imagery thought this terrain looked like a parquet floor). Like all tessera regions, it sits above the surrounding terrain at an elevation of 1 to 2 kilometers, and is heavily deformed by what appears to be contractional folding. Like most tessera units, the surrounding volcanic plains appear to have flowed around Alpha's margins and thus are younger than Alpha.

An infrared map prepared by the Venus Express orbiter shows that the rocks on the Alpha Regio plateau are lighter in colour and look old compared to the majority of the planet. On Earth, such light-coloured rocks are usually granite and form continents.

== See also ==
- Asteria Regio
- Beta Regio
- Ovda Regio
