= Phoebe Regio =

Venusian regio, site of Soviet landers

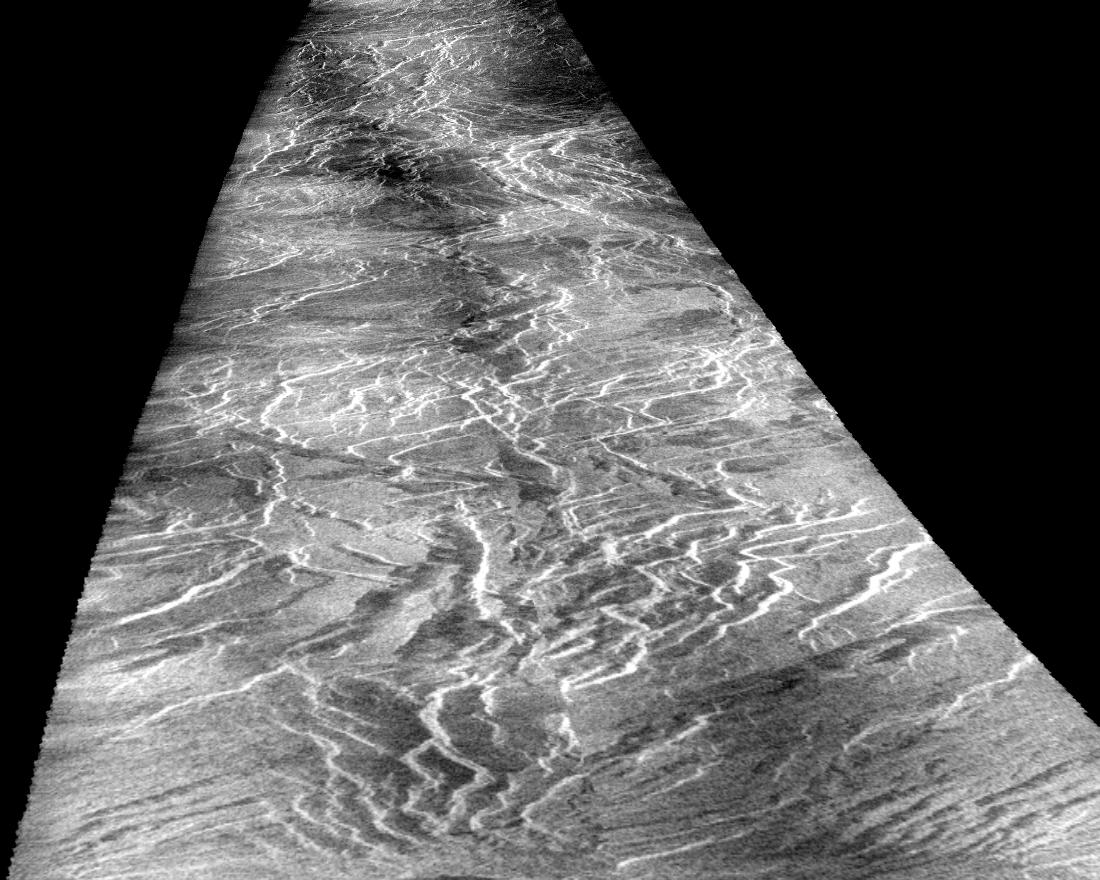
- Asteria Regio and Phoebe Regio, as imaged by the Magellan spacecraft. Asteria Regio is in the northwest, Phoebe Regio in the southeast.
- Feature type: Regio/region
- Coordinates: 6°S 282.8°E
- Diameter: 2,852 KM
- Eponym: Phoebe, Greek titaness

Phoebe Regio is a regio on the planet Venus. It lies to the southeast of Asteria Regio. It is 2,852 kilometres (1,772 mi) in diameter and is the principal feature of the V41 quadrangle, to which it gave its name. Four Soviet landers, Venera 11, Venera 12, Venera 13 and Venera 14, landed on the eastern side of Phoebe Regio and performed various scientific measurements.
