= Beta Regio =

Region of the planet Venus

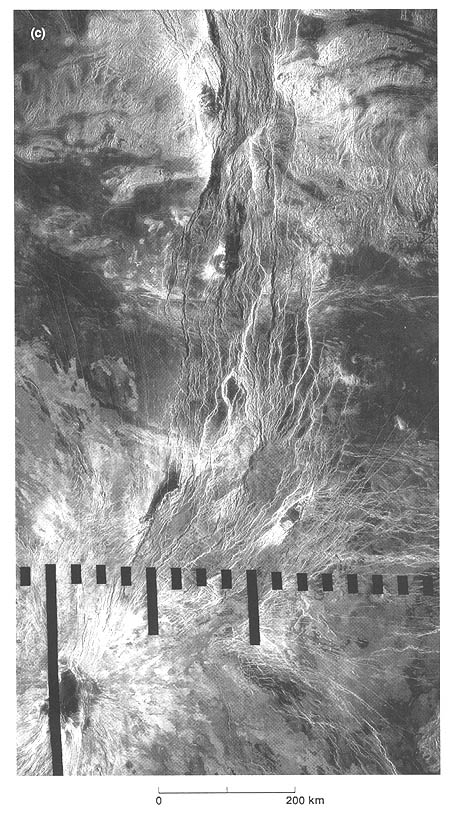
- The rift valley Devana Chasma, 1050 km long and 80 to 240 km wide, in Beta Regio (28°N, 283°E)
- Feature type: Regio
- Coordinates: 25.3°N 282.8°E
- Eponym: Beta

Beta Regio is a region of the planet Venus known as a volcanic rise. Measuring about 3,000 kilometres (1,900 miles) in extent, it constitutes a prominent upland region of Venus centered at 25.3°N 282.8°E.

The first features that showed up in early radar surveys of the planet were given the names of letters of the Greek alphabet. Beta Regio was one of those features. It was discovered and named by Dick Goldstein in 1964. The name was approved by the International Astronomical Union's Working Group for Planetary System Nomenclature (IAU/WGPSN) between 1976 and 1979. Maxwell Montes, Alpha Regio, and Beta Regio are the three exceptions to the rule that the surface features of Venus are to be named for women or goddesses.

Volcanic rises are broad, sloping highlands over 1,000 kilometres (620 miles) across. They are cut by deep troughs 100–200 kilometres (62–124 miles) across. These troughs are an example of continental rifting, and are evidence of surface tectonism.

Beta Regio is cut by a radar-bright north–south trough called Devana Chasma. The northern end has a volcano called Rhea Mons, and the southern end is dominated by a volcano titled Theia Mons.

== See also ==
- Alpha Regio
- Asteria Regio
- Ovda Regio
