= Aphrodite Terra =

Highland region on Venus, near the equator

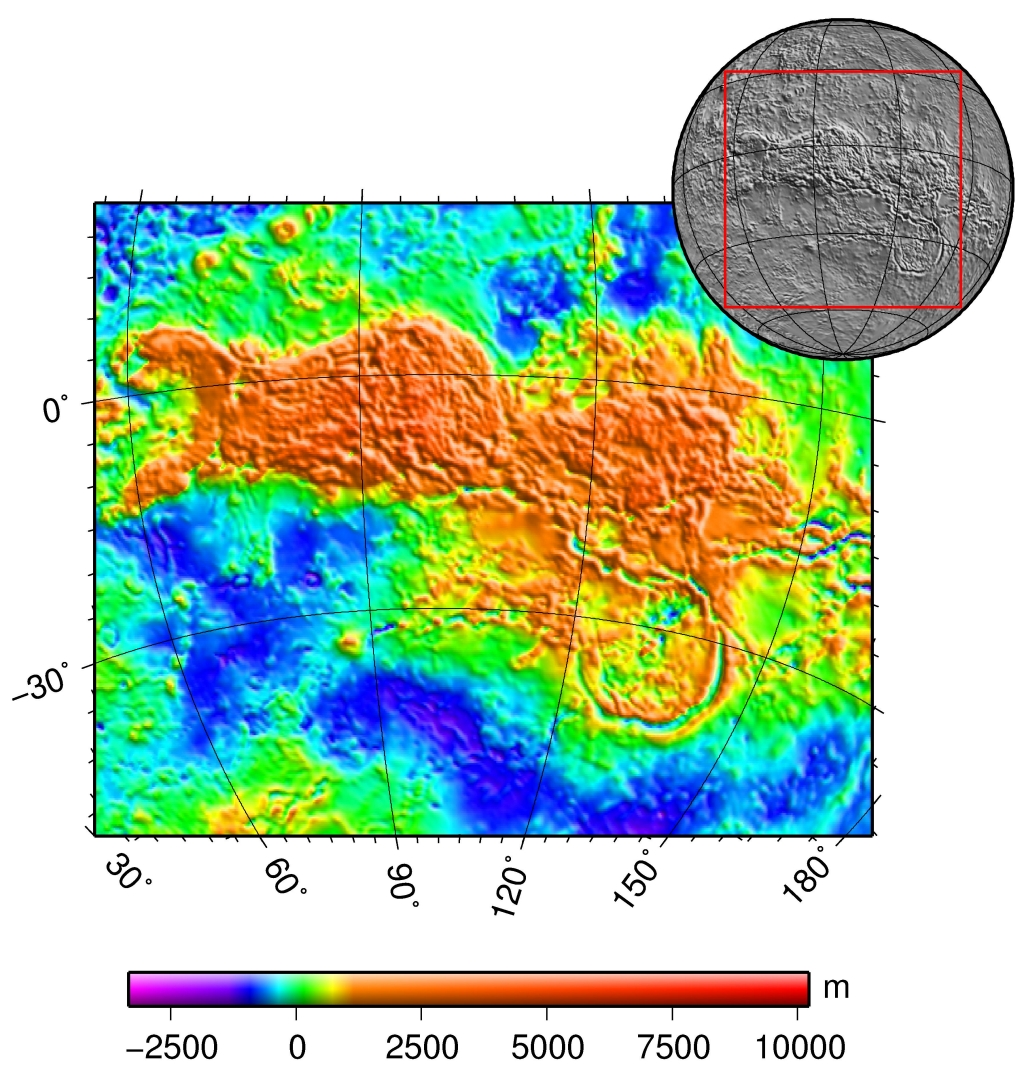
- Topography of western Aphrodite Terra
- Feature type: Highland
- Coordinates: 5.8°S 104.8°E
- Diameter: 10,000 km
- Eponym: Aphrodite

Aphrodite Terra /æfroʊˈdaɪtiː ˈtɛrə/ is one of the three continental regions on the planet Venus, the others being Ishtar Terra and Lada Terra. It is named for Aphrodite, the Greek equivalent of the goddess Venus, and is found near the equator of the planet. The name was adopted by the International Astronomical Union in 1979. Aphrodite Terra is about half the size of Africa, making it the largest of the terrae.

== Description ==
Aphrodite Terra was named by the International Astronomical Union, the governing body for planetary and satellite nomenclature, after Aphrodite, the goddess of love. The name was chosen because Aphrodite is the Greek equivalent of the Roman goddess Venus.

Located near the equator of Venus, Aphrodite Terra has an area about half the size of Africa, and is much larger than the rougher Ishtar Terra. It is covered with deep rift valleys. Like Ishtar Terra, Aphrodite Terra also has mountain ranges but they are only about half the size of the mountains on Ishtar.

Extending nearly two thirds around the planet, Aphrodite Terra's topography appears buckled and fractured which suggests large compressive forces. There are also numerous extensive lava flows across this terrain and some have an interesting bow shape to them due to atmospheric gravity waves.

Aphrodite Terra has two main regions: Ovda Regio in the west and Thetis Regio in the east. Ovda Regio has ridges running in two directions, suggesting that the compressive forces are acting in several directions. Certain dark regions appear to be solidified lava flows. A series of cracks appear where lava has welled up through the surface and flooded the surrounding terrain.

== Gallery ==
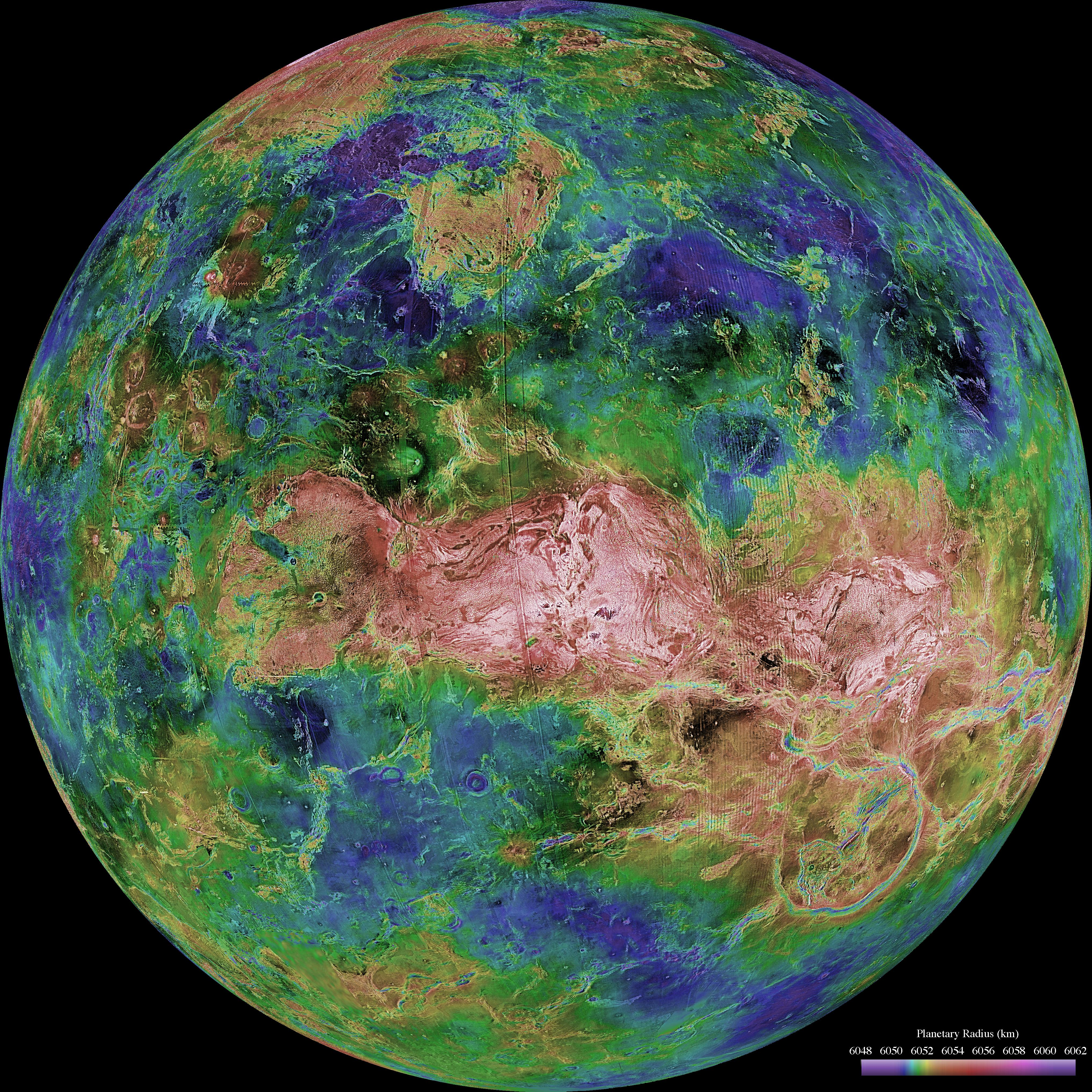
Radar image and topography of the western Aphrodite Terra

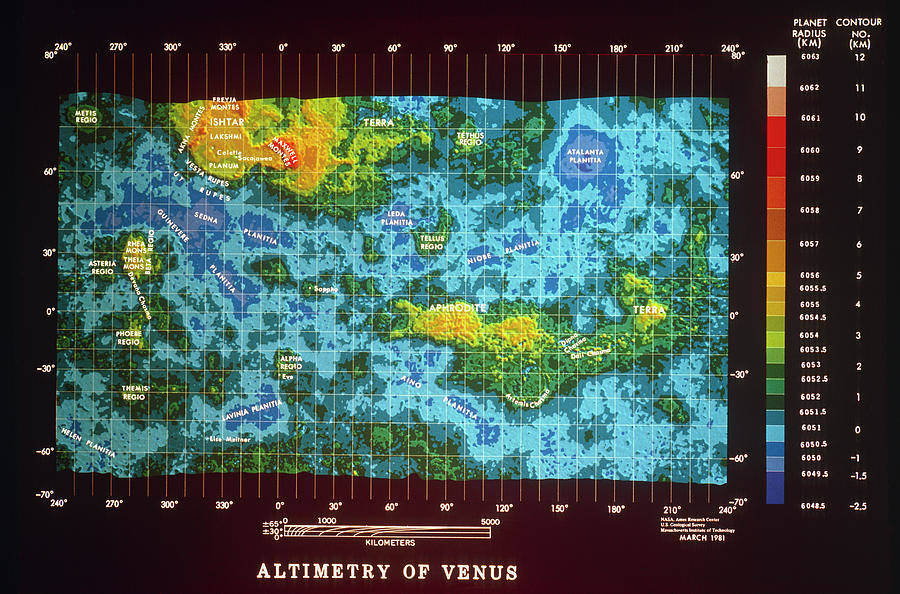
Color-coded elevation map, showing the elevated "continents" in yellow: Aphrodite Terra is just below the equator to the right. Pioneer Venus Orbiter collected these data with radar.

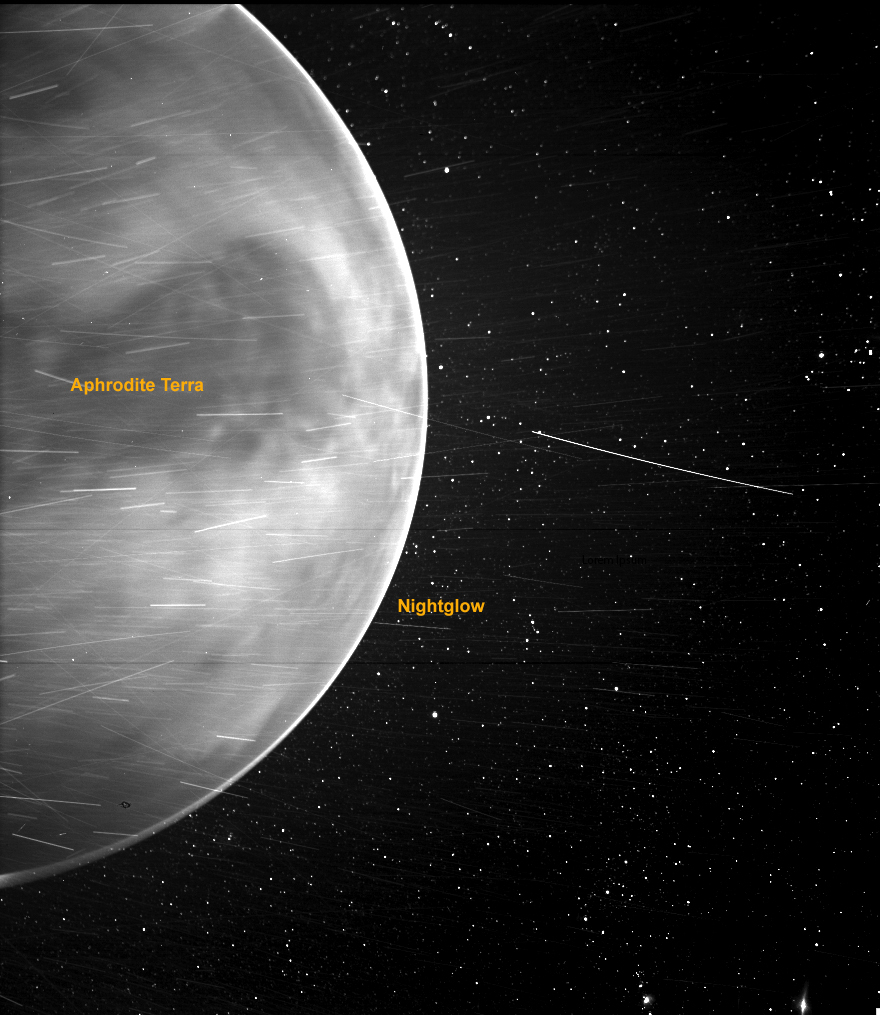
Visible light image of Venus with Ovda Regio plateau of Aphrodite Terra visible, in a first view of the surface of Venus from space (Parker Solar Probe, July 2020)

Parker Solar Probe images showing features on the Venusian surface, such as the continental region Aphrodite Terra, the Tellus Regio plateau, and the Aino Planitia plains.

== See also ==
- Geography of Venus
- Ishtar Terra
- Lada Terra
- Vega 1
- Vega 2
