= Sapas =

Sapas may refer to:

- Sapas, a Canaanite goddess
- Sapas Mons, a volcano on Venus
- Sapas (crater), a crater on Ganymede
