= Volcanism on Venus =

Overview of volcanic activity on the planet Venus

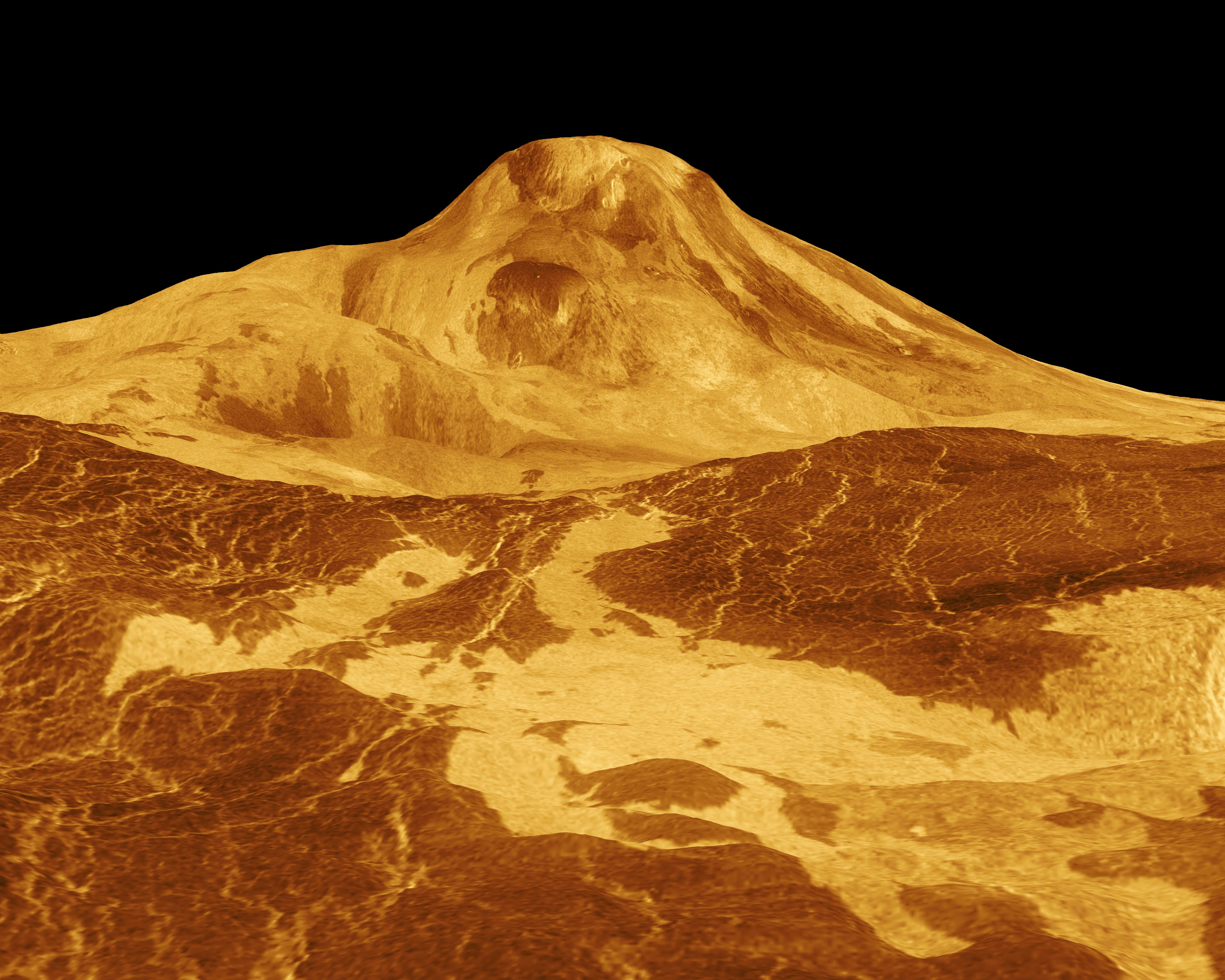
The second highest mountain and highest volcano of Venus, the 8-km-high (5-mile-high) volcano Maat Mons, is displayed in this perspective view of the surface of Venus, with the vertical scale multiplied by 22.5. Based on Magellan radar images. In the foreground, long lava flows are visible.

The surface of Venus is dominated by volcanic features and has more volcanoes than any other planet in the Solar System. It has a surface that is 90% basalt, and about 65% of the planet consists of a mosaic of volcanic lava plains, indicating that volcanism played a major role in shaping its surface. There are more than 1,000 volcanic structures and possible periodic resurfacing of Venus by floods of lava. The planet may have had a major global resurfacing event about 500 million years ago, from what scientists can tell from the density of impact craters on the surface. Venus has an atmosphere rich in carbon dioxide, with a pressure that is 90 times that of Earth's atmosphere.

There are over 80,000 volcanoes on Venus detected through radar mapping. For many years scientists debated on whether Venus was currently active or if the volcanic structures were remnants from the past. There are few impact craters on Venus's surface which pointed to relatively recent resurfacing. The most likely resurfacing event would have been volcanic flows. Radar sounding by the Magellan probe revealed evidence for comparatively recent volcanic activity at Venus's highest volcano Maat Mons, in the form of ash flows near the summit and on the northern flank. Although many lines of evidence such as this suggest that volcanoes on Venus have been recently active, present-day eruptions at Maat Mons have not been confirmed. Nevertheless, other more recent studies, in 2020, suggest that Venus, though not Maat Mons specifically, is indeed currently volcanically active. In 2023, scientists reexamined topographical images of the Maat Mons region taken by the Magellan orbiter. Using computer simulations they determined that the topography had changed during an 8-month interval, and have concluded that active volcanism was the cause. Until 2023, there had only been hints of active volcanism. In March 2023, Herrick et al. announced that they had imaged a vent expanding in Magellan images, indicating active volcanism on Venus.

== Types of volcanoes ==
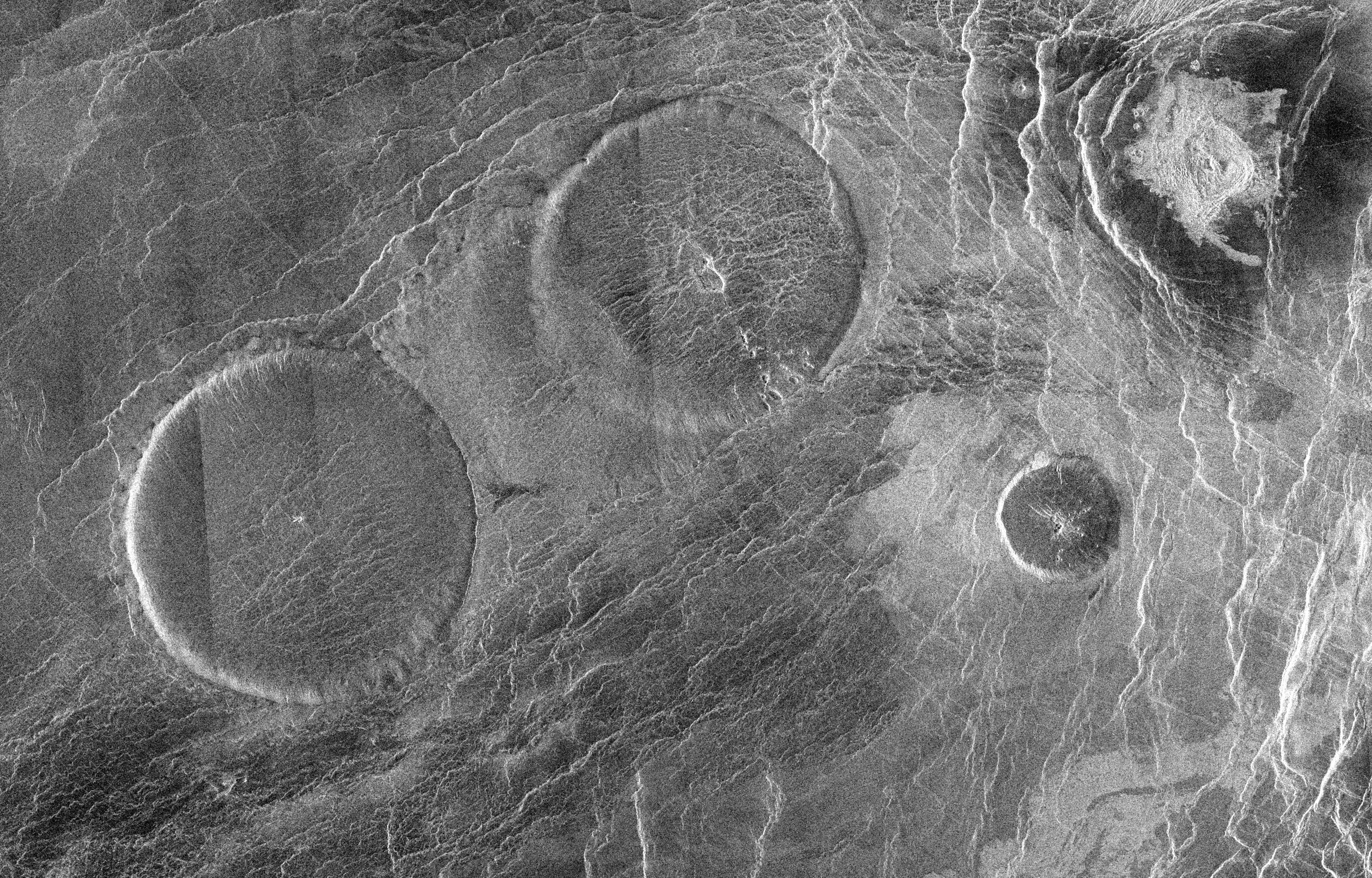
Radar mosaic of two 65 km (40 mi) wide (and less than 1 km (0.62 mi) high) pancake domes in Venus's Eistla region

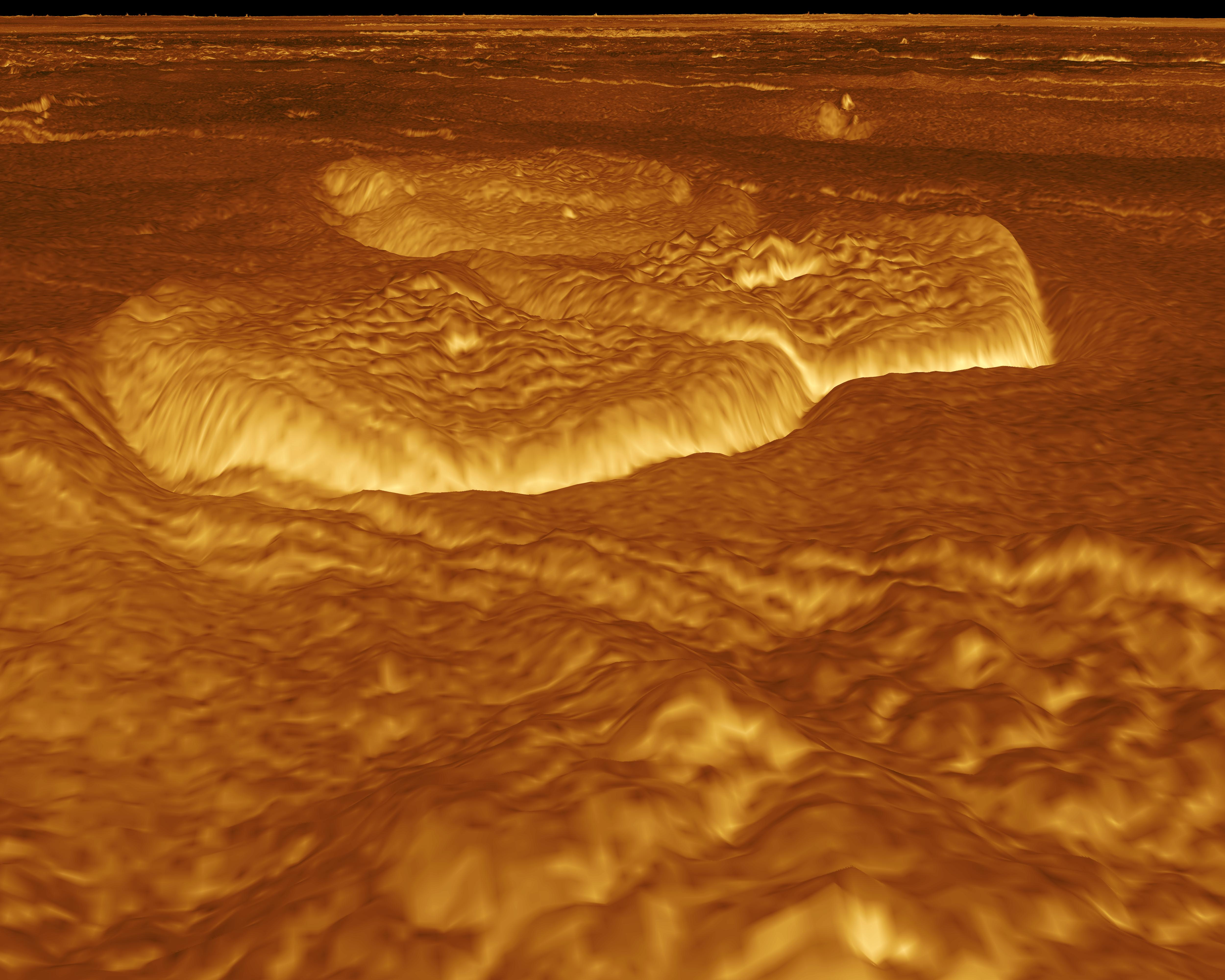
Computer-generated perspective view of pancake domes in Venus's Alpha Regio

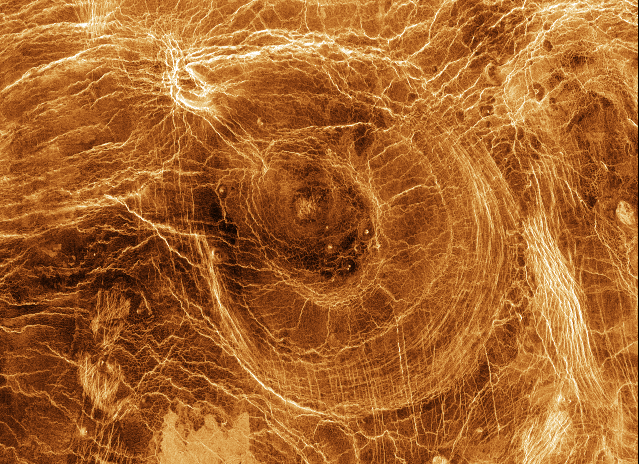
Arachnoid surface feature on Venus

Venus has shield volcanoes, widespread lava flows and some unusual volcanoes called pancake domes and "tick-like" structures which are not present on Earth. Pancake dome volcanoes are up to 15 km (9.3 mi) in diameter and less than 1 km (0.62 mi) in height and are 100 times larger than lava domes formed on Earth. They are usually associated with coronae and tesserae (large regions of highly deformed terrain, folded and fractured in two or three dimensions, which are unique to Venus). The pancakes are thought to be formed by highly viscous, silica-rich lava erupting under Venus's high atmospheric pressure.

The "tick-like" structures are called scalloped margin domes. They are commonly called ticks because they appear as domes with numerous legs. They are thought to have undergone mass wasting events such as landslides on their margins. Sometimes deposits of debris can be seen scattered around them.

On Earth, volcanoes are mainly of two types: shield volcanoes and composite or stratovolcanoes. The shield volcanoes, for example those in Hawaii, eject magma from the depths of the Earth in zones called hot spots. The lava from these volcanoes is relatively fluid and permits the escape of gases. Composite volcanoes, such as Mount St. Helens and Mount Pinatubo, are associated with tectonic plates. In this type of volcano, the oceanic crust of one plate is sliding underneath the other in a subduction zone, together with an inflow of seawater, producing a gummier lava that restricts the exit of the gases, and for that reason, composite volcanoes tend to erupt more violently.

On Venus, where there are no tectonic plates or seawater, volcanoes are mostly of the shield type. Nevertheless, the morphology of volcanoes on Venus is different: on Earth, shield volcanoes can be a few tens of kilometres wide and up to 10 km (6.2 mi) high in the case of Mauna Kea, measured from the sea floor. On Venus, these volcanoes can cover hundreds of kilometres in area, but they are relatively flat, with an average height of 1.5 km (0.93 mi). Large volcanoes cause the Venusian lithosphere to flex downward because of their enormous vertical loads, producing flexural moats or ring fractures around the edifices. Large volcano edifice loading also causes magma chambers to fracture in a sill-like pattern, affecting magma propagation beneath the surface.

Other unique features of Venus's surface are novae (radial networks of dikes or grabens) and arachnoids. A nova is formed when large quantities of magma are extruded onto the surface to form radiating ridges and trenches which are highly reflective to radar. These dikes form a symmetrical network around the central point where the lava emerged, where there may also be a depression caused by the collapse of the magma chamber.

Arachnoids are so named because they resemble a spider's web, featuring several concentric ovals surrounded by a complex network of radial fractures similar to those of a nova. It is not known whether the 250 or so features identified as arachnoids actually share a common origin, or are the result of different geological processes.

== Recent volcanic activity ==
Volcanism on Venus has taken place within the last 2.5 million years; however, until recently there had been no absolute proof that any volcano on Venus has erupted recently. Recent radar imagery shows more than 1,000 volcanic structures and evidence of possible periodic resurfacing of the planet by floods of lava. In addition to the radar images, there is supporting evidence that volcanism has taken place, including an unusual change in the amount of sulphur dioxide gas in the upper atmosphere. Sulphur dioxide is an important component of volcanic outgassing. However, the sulphur dioxide in the lower atmosphere remains stable. This could mean that a change in the global atmosphere caused the sulphur dioxide concentration to increase above the clouds. Even though the change in the atmosphere may be evidence that there have been volcanoes that erupted in Venus, it is difficult to determine whether they occurred or not. In 2014, the first direct evidence for ongoing volcanism was located, in the form of infrared "flashes" over the edges of rift zone Ganis Chasma, near the shield volcano Sapas Mons. These flashes were detectable during two or three consecutive Earth days in 2008 and 2009 and are thought to be caused either by hot gases or lava released from volcanic eruptions. Scientists suspect that there are four volcanoes that may be active: Maat Mons, Ozza Mons, Sapas Mons and Idunn Mons.

In 2020, a study by University of Maryland supported by Swiss National Science Foundation and NASA discovered that 37 of Venus's coronae show signs of ongoing activity. Maryland professor Laurent Montesi said, "we are able to point to specific structures and say 'Look, this is not an ancient volcano but one that is active today, dormant perhaps, but not dead...'" The active coronae are clustered near each other, so positioning geologic survey instruments would now be easier.

In March 2023, at the 54th Lunar Planetary Science Conference, a team revealed the first images of volcanic activity on the surface of Venus. The announcement consisted of two radar images from different cycles of Magellan data (8 months apart) that displayed a volcanic vent that had expanded by almost 2 square kilometers. This data was over 30 years old at the time of this discovery. The scientists checked that this expansion could not be explained by the angle at which the images were taken through computer simulations, which revealed that the change must be structural. A new research published in May 2024 in the journal Nature Astronomy using too data from Magellan pointed in the same direction.

=== Lightning ===
Lightning on Venus may serve as a diagnostic of volcanism or atmospheric convection, so some effort has been devoted to detecting possible lightning on Venus. No lightning has been directly observed, but the most compelling evidence is the very low frequency (VLF) radio emissions recorded beneath the clouds by all four of the Venera landers. The Japanese orbiter Akatsuki was searching for visible lightning on Venus, among other science objectives.

=== Atmospheric phosphine ===
In 2020, Greaves et al. detected phosphine levels of 1–5 parts per billion in Venus's atmosphere using ALMA and JCMT. Historic data from Pioneer Venus also shows the possible detection of phosphine. Phosphine (PH_{3}) is derived from phosphide (P^{3−}) through the following interaction with sulfuric acid in Venus's atmosphere:

2 P^{3−} + 3 H_{2}SO_{4} → 2 PH_{3} + 3 SO^{2−}_{4}

Phosphide comes from metals such as iron and magnesium, which should exist in great quantities in Venus's mantle. The phosphines were detected at a height of 70 km, which implies a volcanic eruption on the explosive scale of Krakatau or Yellowstone on Earth. The implication of this is not only that Venus has experienced recent volcanism, but that it is capable of explosive eruptions despite the lack of hydrated melts similar to those created at subduction zones on Earth. It is thought that Venus may have primordial water in the mantle that could be concentrated through fractionation.

Biological activity has been suggested as an alternate explanation for the phosphines in Venus's atmosphere, but this is unlikely due to the absence of any other biosignatures. Another hypothesis states that the phosphine could be produced in Venus's clouds, but this process requires water which is generally unavailable on Venus. Some scientists question that the phosphine levels found are truly as high as indicated. If the phosphine is present in amounts of 1–5 ppb and can be determined to originate in the mantle, it will imply a deep mantle plume system which contains enough volatiles to produce explosive volcanism.

=== Exploration ===
In 2010, Suzanne E. Smrekar et al. published that Venus Express observed three volcanoes that have had eruptions about 250,000 years ago or less, which suggests that Venus is periodically resurfaced by lava flows. She has proposed two missions to Venus to elucidate the planet: Venus Origins Explorer (VOX), and VERITAS. Meanwhile, the Japanese spacecraft, Akatsuki's goals were to scan for active volcanism using its infrared cameras, although the infrared detector that was supposed to do this failed in December 2016 after a relatively short period of observations.

Three missions are expected to launch in the 2030s, VERITAS, DAVINCI, and EnVision, all of which will help detect volcanism. Both VERITAS and EnVision will use radar remote sensing to map the surface of Venus at resolution 10 times better than that of Magellan. These missions will allow mapping over different time periods that could display more, higher resolution, evidence of current day volcanism.

EnVision has the VenSAR (Venus Synthetic Aperture Radar) instrument that will map down to 30 m resolution and even down to 1 m in select areas. The SRS (Subsurface Radar Sounder) will penetrate the surface up to a kilometer and receive signals back that can be used to describe the internal structures of the planet. This will help to learn about internal workings of volcanic structures. The Venus Emisivity Mapper (VEM) will map the surface in infrared wavelengths which when added to radar can describe the topography of the surface.

DAVINCI will not be mapping the surface, but analyzing the atmosphere. The analysis of SO_{2} and other gasses will help to learn about out gassing from recent volcanoes. DAVINCI will have a probe that descends into the atmosphere collecting data along the way. Atmospheric analysis will provide important information to pair with the recent discovery of active volcanism.

VERITAS will also have the Venus Emissivity Mapper (VEM) and a radar imager VISAR (Venus Interferometric Synthetic Aperture Radar). These will map lava fields and volcanoes on Venus's surface. Originally set to launch in 2027, this mission has been delayed until 2030. If VERITAS resumes its original launch date, the data between VERTIAS and EnVision will pair together similarly to the various cycles of Magellan data. They would then have the opportunity to view volcanic changes across a set of years.

== Identifying volcanoes on Venus ==
Locating volcanoes on Venus became possible during the Magellan mission in 1990, which mapped over 95% of the surface of Venus. The surface of Venus is hidden by clouds but surface features can be mapped using synthetic aperture radar. Some images created by this mapping can give a perspective view of the elevation of the surface of Venus, which assists in the identification of volcanoes. Volcanic features discovered include flood lavas, edifice clusters, shield volcanoes, volcanic cones, and volcanic domes. Since the Magellan mission, more than 1,660 volcanic landforms have been identified on the surface of Venus. Further analysis of the Magellan data revealed more than 85,000 volcanoes.

After the surface of Venus was mapped, the California Institute of Technology created an algorithm for automatically identifying volcanoes from the mapping images. Certainty that all the identified features are volcanoes is not possible but a system of categories was developed that label the confidence of whether a surface feature is a volcano or not. The algorithm examines images of a 30 km × 30 km area of the surface of Venus and areas considered to be volcanoes are reshaped into a vector and processed through a series of equations. This algorithm has been used to identify multiple volcanoes in different mapping images from Venus.

Scientists are also able to determine the age of volcanoes on Venus using images from the Magellan mission, for example by examining wrinkle ridges on regional plains; if the flanking slopes of a volcano do not have wrinkles ridges, then they would be considered young.

=== Examples ===
==== Sif Mons ====
The Sif Mons volcano is 350 km in diameter, 2 km high, and is in the Western Eistla Regio Rise. Based on the mapping of the volcano, the area around the central caldera is mostly flat with many chain pits surrounding the area. On eastern parts of the volcano, lava has flooded from the main caldera to smaller calderas nearby. Evidence suggests that there were many flank eruptions at this volcano. Most of the flow fields around this volcano are sheet flow fields.

==== Gula Mons ====
The Gula Mons volcano is 460 km in diameter, 3.2 km high and is in the Western Eistla Regio Rise. Gula Mons is considered to be a shield volcano. This volcano has a central edifice that is surrounded by the peaks of the volcano. Mapping suggests that there are multiple caldera pits in this volcano that are partially filled with lava.

==== Kunapipi Mons ====
The Kunapipi Mons volcano has a diameter of 580 km, is 2.5 km high and is on the Juno Chasma rift. The summit of the volcano is a long plateau region. The main edifice of this volcano consists of many short flows and most of these flows are sheet flows.

== See also ==
- Volcanism on Io
- Volcanism on Mars
