= Zamudio (crater) =

Crater on Venus

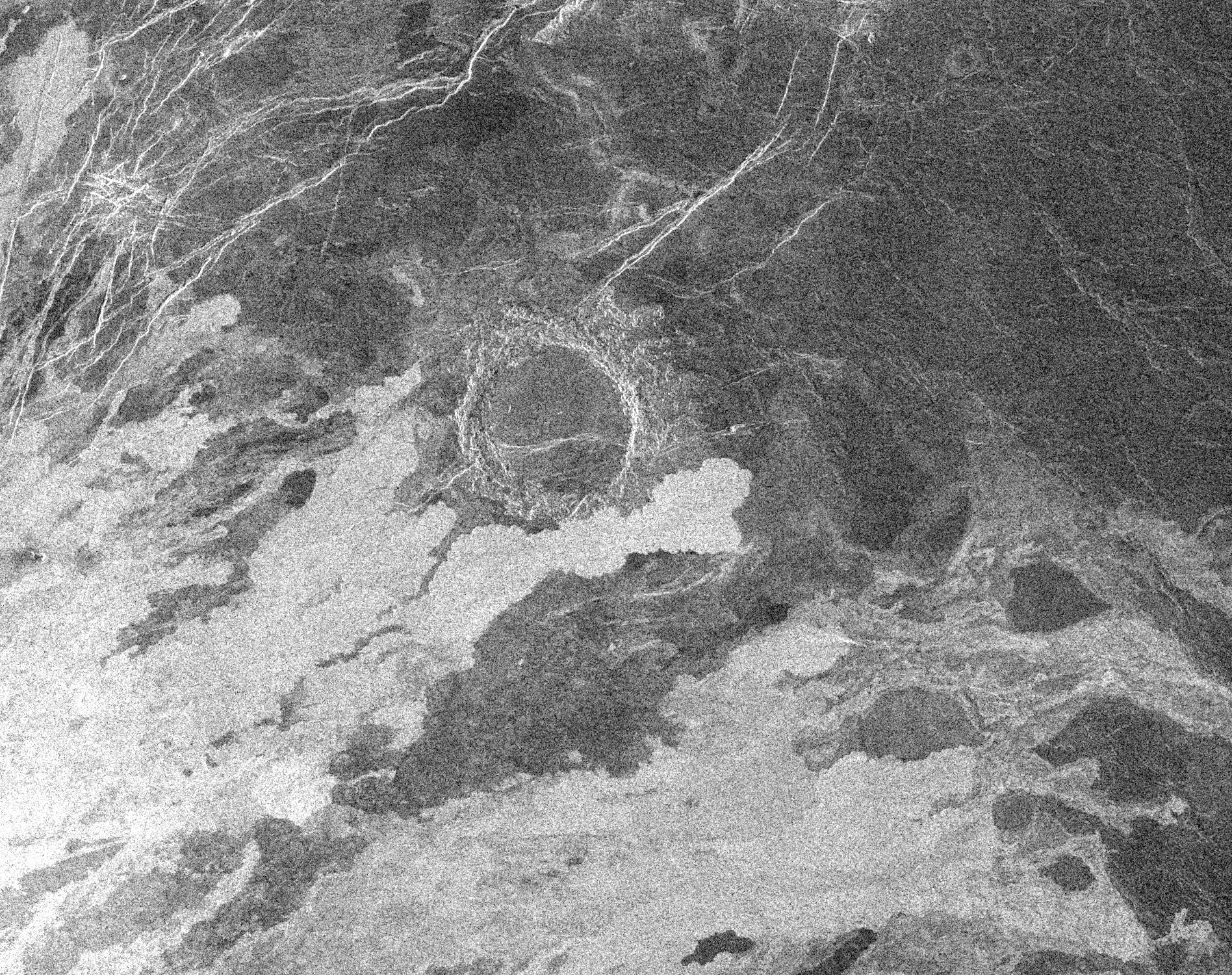
- Location: Venus
- Coordinates: 9.6°N 170.7°W
- Diameter: 19 km
- Eponym: Adela Zamudio, Bolivian poet (1854–1928).

Zamudio is a 19 km diameter crater on the surface of Venus, with a continuous ejecta radius of 9.3 km. It is a flooded crater.

Its name derives after the Bolivian poet named Adela Zamudio. The name was accepted by the IAU in the year 1994.

== Modification ==
Zamudio has been modified by the volcano, Sapas Mons. The lava flows northeast from the volcano covered parts of Zamudio, ranging in width from 5 to 25 km (3-16 miles) with lengths of 50 to 100 km (31-62 miles). This makes Zamudio one of the few special craters to be modified by flowing lava, considering that this is rare.
