= Idunn Mons =

Volcano on Venus

- Feature type: Shield volcano
- Coordinates: 46.5°S 214.5°E
- Diameter: 250 km (160 mi)
- Peak: 2.5 km (1.6 mi) 8,202.1 ft (2,500.0 m); 3.6 km (2.2 mi) 11,811 ft (3,600 m) above mean.
- Eponym: Iðunn

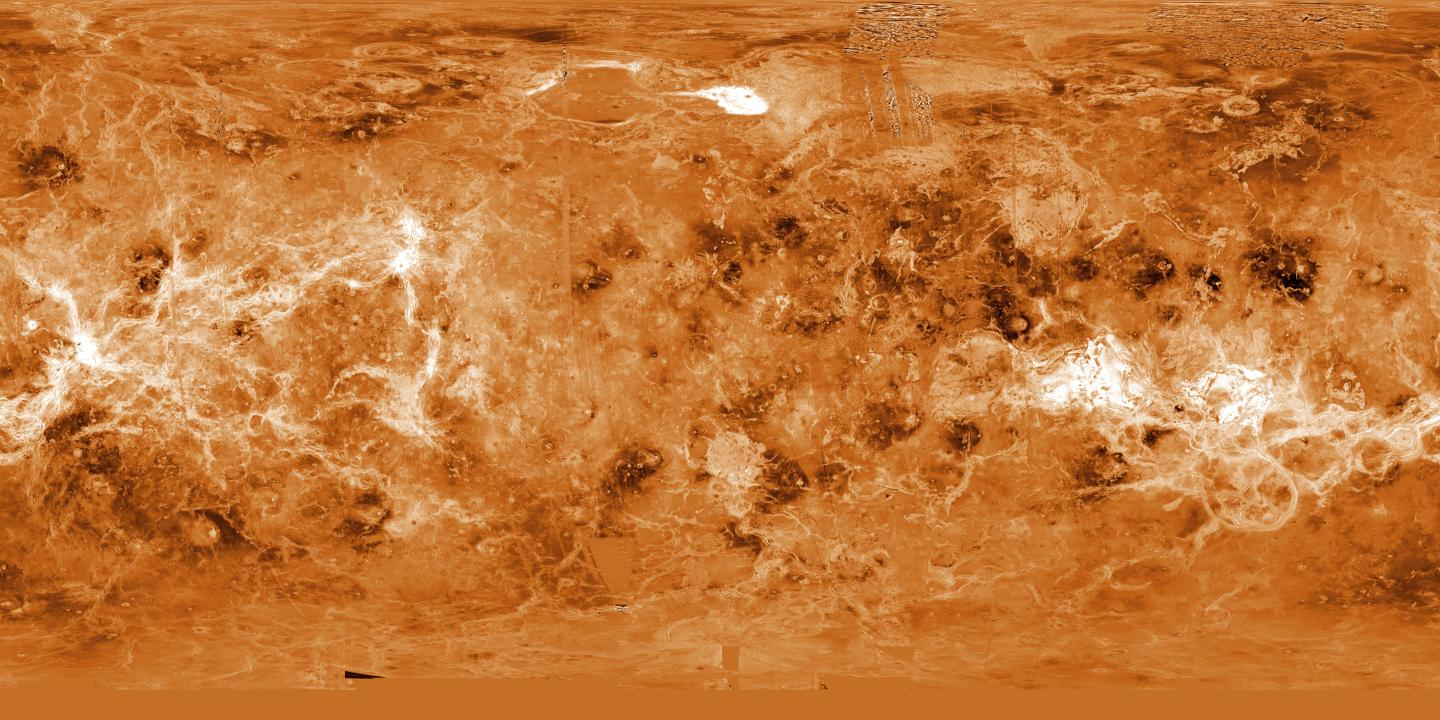
Idunn Mons location on Venusian surface.

Idunn Mons is a shield volcano on the planet Venus. It is named after Iðunn, a goddess in Norse mythology.

== Structure ==
The volcano rises above the flat highlands of Imdr Regio, an igneous province, to a height of 2.5 km (1.6 mi), and is approximately 250 km in diameter. It rises approximately 3.6 km above the mean planetary radius. Lava flows originating from the volcano have traveled in all directions, reaching as far as 550 km. The Olapa Chasma, a 1,300-km-long rift system, crosses the volcano in a northwest–southeast direction.

The volcano features a 45-km-wide, flat-topped summit at its center. A cluster of overlapping calderas between 14 and 17 km in diameter is centered at the summit. To the northeast of the caldera cluster is a dome-shaped feature. The flat-topped summit may be explained by flank collapses due to tectonic instability as it is situated within the Olapa Chasma rift. These flank collapses altered the topography of the volcano. Young summit lava flows began to cover the affected ares, eventually burying the collapse area in new flows that reconstructed the flank.

== Activity ==
There are claims by scientists that Idunn Mons is volcanically active or was active recently, although no eruptions have been directly observed. Volcanism on Venus is not well-studied, but the lack of impact craters and discovery of phosphine in the chemical composition of its atmosphere suggest recent or ongoing volcanic activity.

Recent lava flows have buried evidence of rift fractures and lateral collapse, and the lack of erosion suggest young eruptive activity. Along the eastern flank are possible collapse scars and amphitheater-like structures that may represent parasitic cones. Previous studies have dated the lava flows at 2.5 million to 250,000 years old. However, a 2021 study published by the American Astronomical Society suggests the last eruption of Idunn Mons may have occurred from within the last 10,000 years to as recent as several years ago.

== See also ==
- Volcanism on Venus
