= Scalloped margin dome =

Type of volcanic dome on Venus

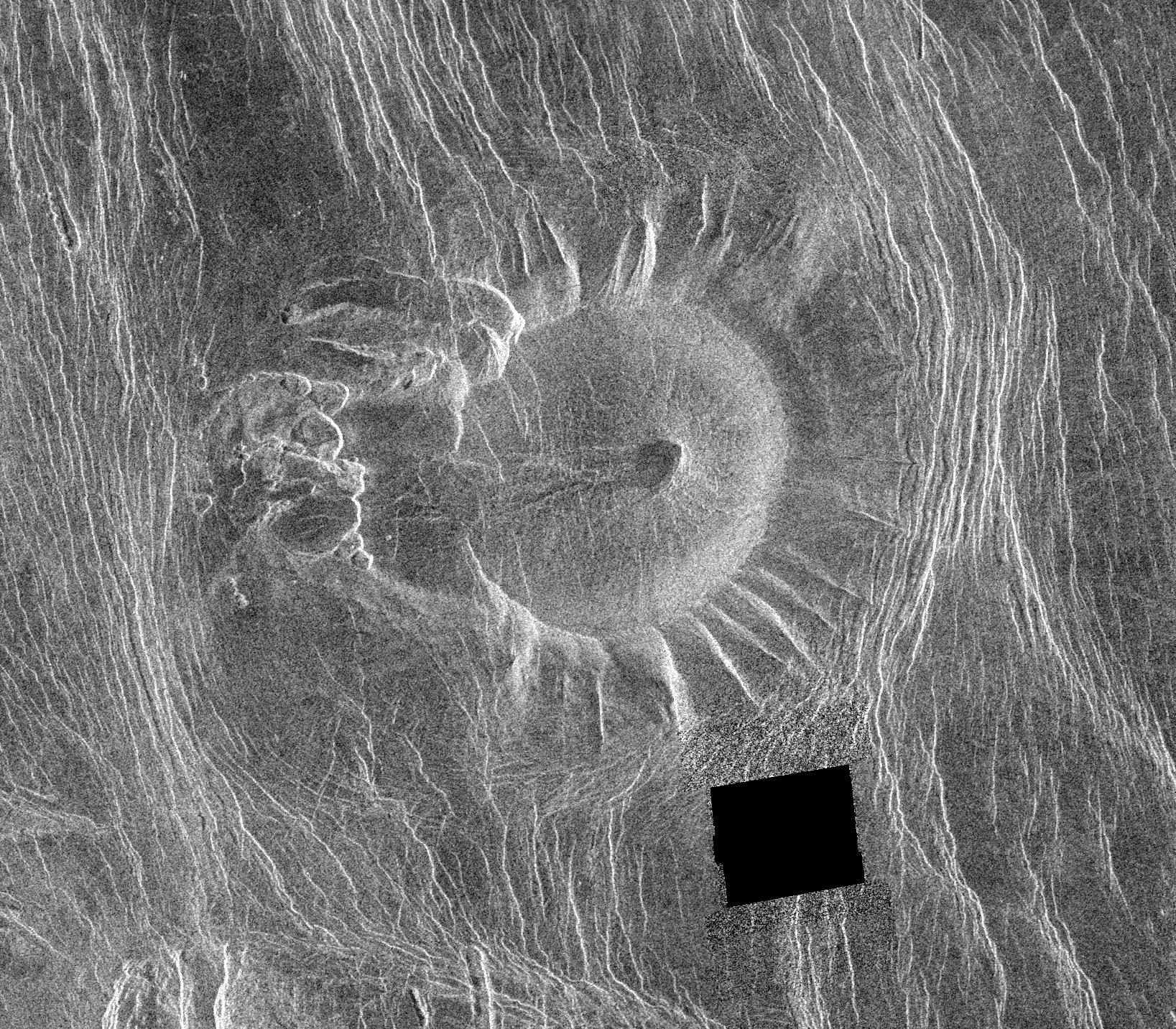
The first discovered scalloped margin dome: The Tick

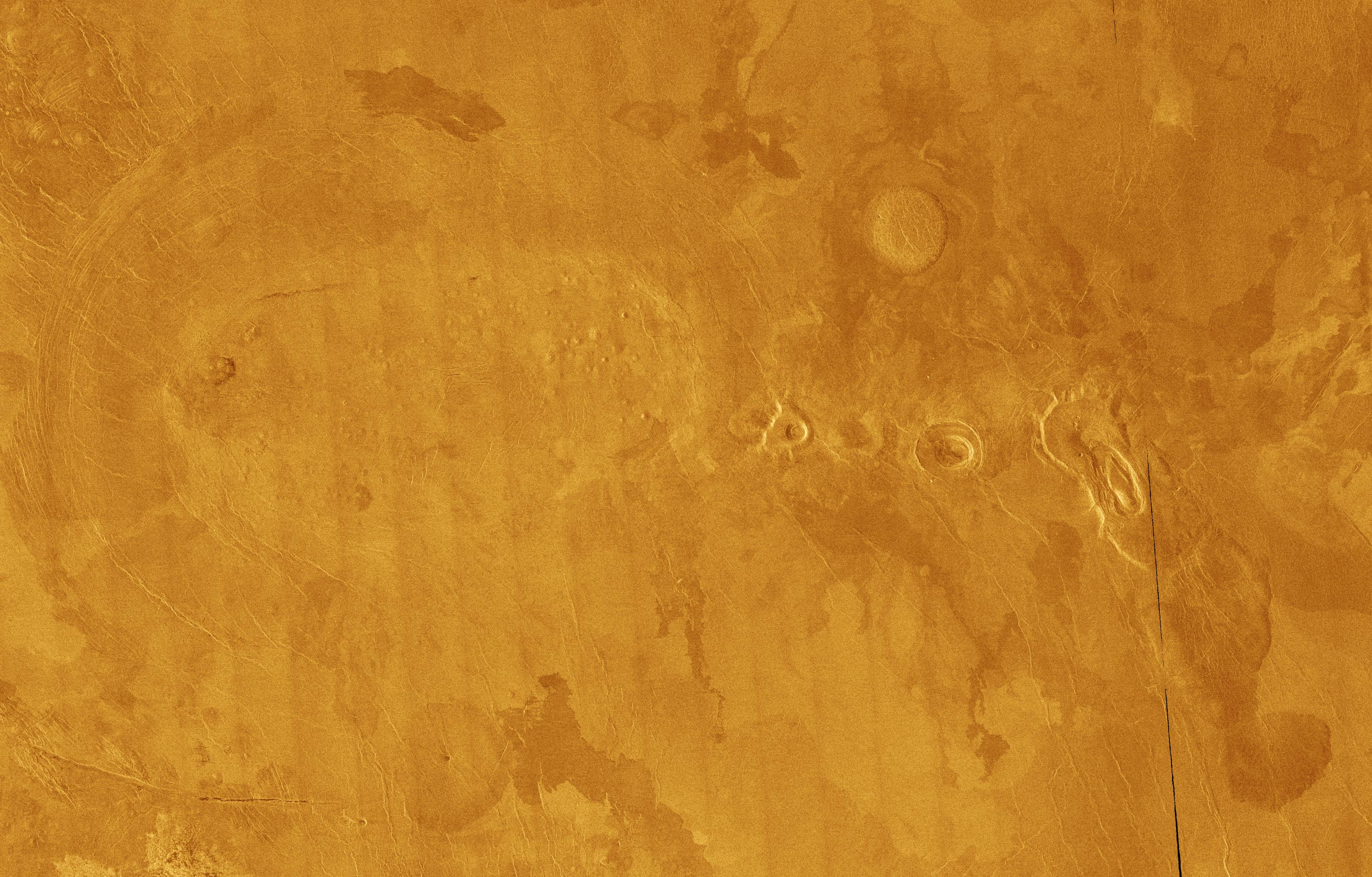
The small, bright bumps clustered in the left portion of the image are a grouping of small volcanoes called a shield field. To the right of the shield field is another type of volcano, called a scalloped dome.

A scalloped margin dome is a type of volcanic dome, found on Venus, that has experienced collapse and mass wasting such as landslides on its perimeter. The margins of these domes have arcuate headscarps or 'scallops' separated by ridges that are a consequence of adjoining scallops. Sometimes debris or slumping can be found at the bottom of these scarps or scattered many tens of kilometers away. Many examples show no debris at all. The center of these domes is often, but not always, a depression. There is another theory that the radial ridges of scalloped margin domes are volcanic dikes.

During the first month of data from the Magellan spacecraft, the first of these features was found to the northeast of Alpha Regio, on Venus. It was one of the largest of these domes and therefore stood out. The strange feature was originally dubbed by the Magellan Project Science Team The Tick, because the many radiating ridges resembled the legs of a tick. Its concavity was likely confused as domelike as a tick's body, instead of the actuality which is that it is a bowl-shaped depression. Through the first year of Magellan image data The Tick was thought to be a unique feature until an aide to the science team catalogued inconspicuous similar features all over Venus. This resulted in referring to the features as 'ticks' which was later changed to 'scalloped margin domes'.

== See also ==
- Volcanism on Venus
