= Iðunn =

Norse goddess

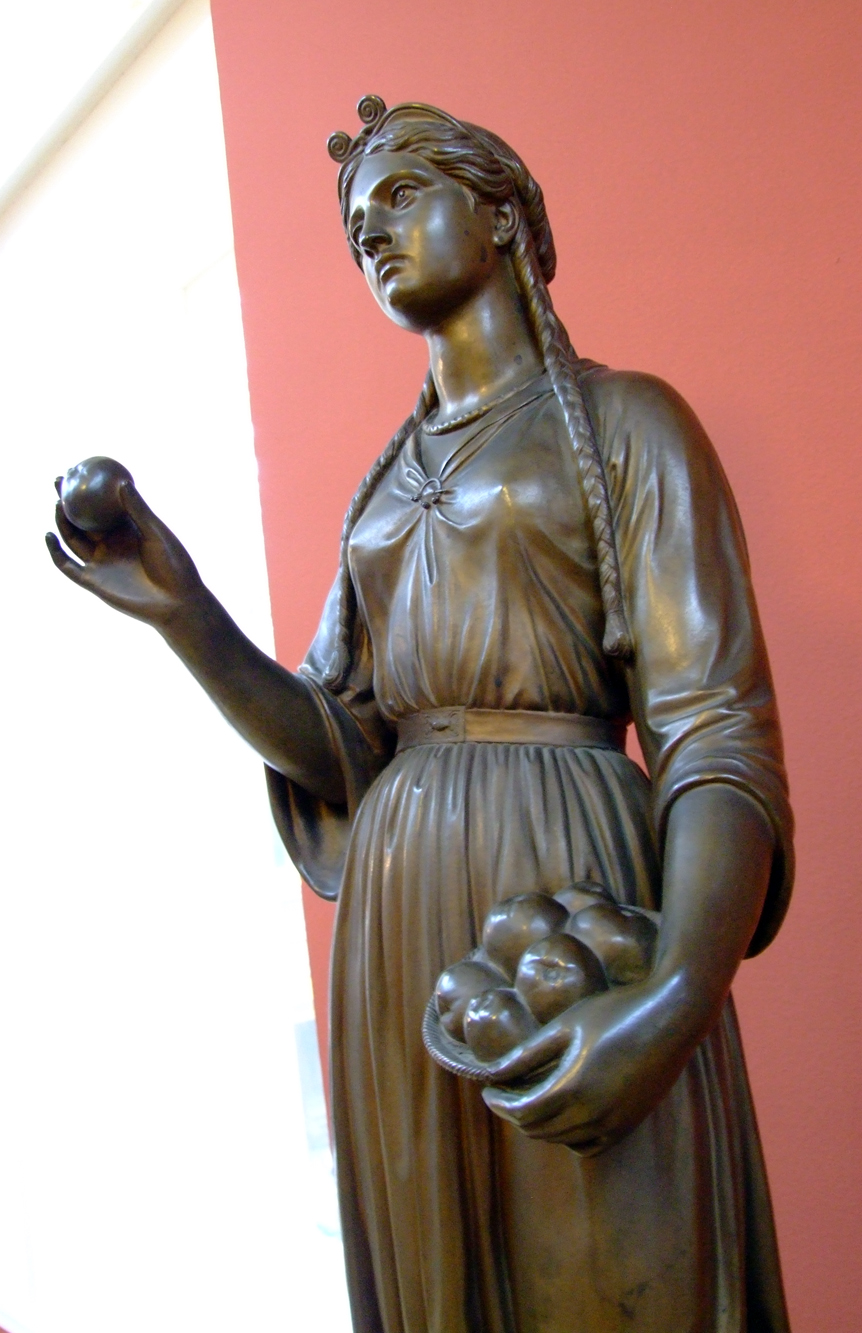
Ydun (1858) by Herman Wilhelm Bissen

In Norse mythology, Iðunn is a goddess associated with apples and youth. Iðunn is attested in the Poetic Edda, compiled in the 13th century from earlier traditional sources, and the Prose Edda, written in the 13th century by Snorri Sturluson. In both sources, she is described as the wife of the skaldic god Bragi, and in the Prose Edda, also as a keeper of apples and granter of eternal youthfulness.

The Prose Edda relates how Loki was once forced by the jötunn Þjazi to lure Iðunn out of Asgard and into a wood with the promise of apples even fairer than her own. Þjazi, in the form of an eagle, abducts Iðunn from the wood, bearing her off to his home. Iðunn's absence causes the gods to grow old and grey, and they realize that Loki is responsible for her disappearance. Under duress, Loki promises to bring her back and, setting out in the form of a falcon, eventually finds her alone at Þjazi's home. He turns her into a nut and flies back toward Asgard. When Þjazi returns to find Iðunn gone, he assumes his eagle form once more and flies off in hot pursuit of Loki and his precious burden. The gods build a pyre in the courtyard of Asgard and, just as Loki has stopped short of it, kindle it. Unable to halt his frenzied onrush, Þjazi plunges headlong through the fire, falling to the ground with his feathers aflame, whereupon the gods attack and kill him.

A number of theories surround Iðunn, including potential links to fertility, and her potential origin in Proto-Indo-European religion. Long the subject of artworks, Iðunn is sometimes referenced in modern popular culture.

== Name ==
The name Iðunn has been variously explained as meaning 'ever young', 'rejuvenator', or 'the rejuvenating one'. As the modern English alphabet lacks the eth (ð) character, Iðunn is sometimes anglicized as Idhunn, Idunn, Idun, or Ithun. An -a suffix is sometimes appended to denote femininity, resulting in forms such as Iduna and Idunna.

The name Iðunn appears as a personal name in several historical sources and the Landnámabók records that it has been in use in Iceland as a personal name since the pagan period (10th century). Landnámabók records two incidents of women by the name of Iðunn; Iðunn Arnardóttir, the daughter of an early settler, and Iðunn Molda-Gnúpsdóttir, granddaughter of one of the earliest settlers recorded in the book. The name Iðunn has been theorized as the origin of the Old English name Idonea. The 19th century author C.M. Yonge writes that the derivation of Idonea from Idunn is "almost certain," noting that although Idonea may be "the feminine of the Latin idoneus (fit), its absence in the Romance countries may be taken as an indication that it was a mere classicising of the northern goddess of the apples of youth."

The 19th century scholar Jacob Grimm proposed a potential etymological connection to the idisi. Grimm states that "with the original form idis the goddess Idunn may possibly be connected." Grimm further states that Iðunn may have been known with another name, and that "Iðunn would seem by Saem. 89a to be an Elvish word, but we do not hear of any other name for the goddess."

== Attestations ==
=== Poetic Edda ===
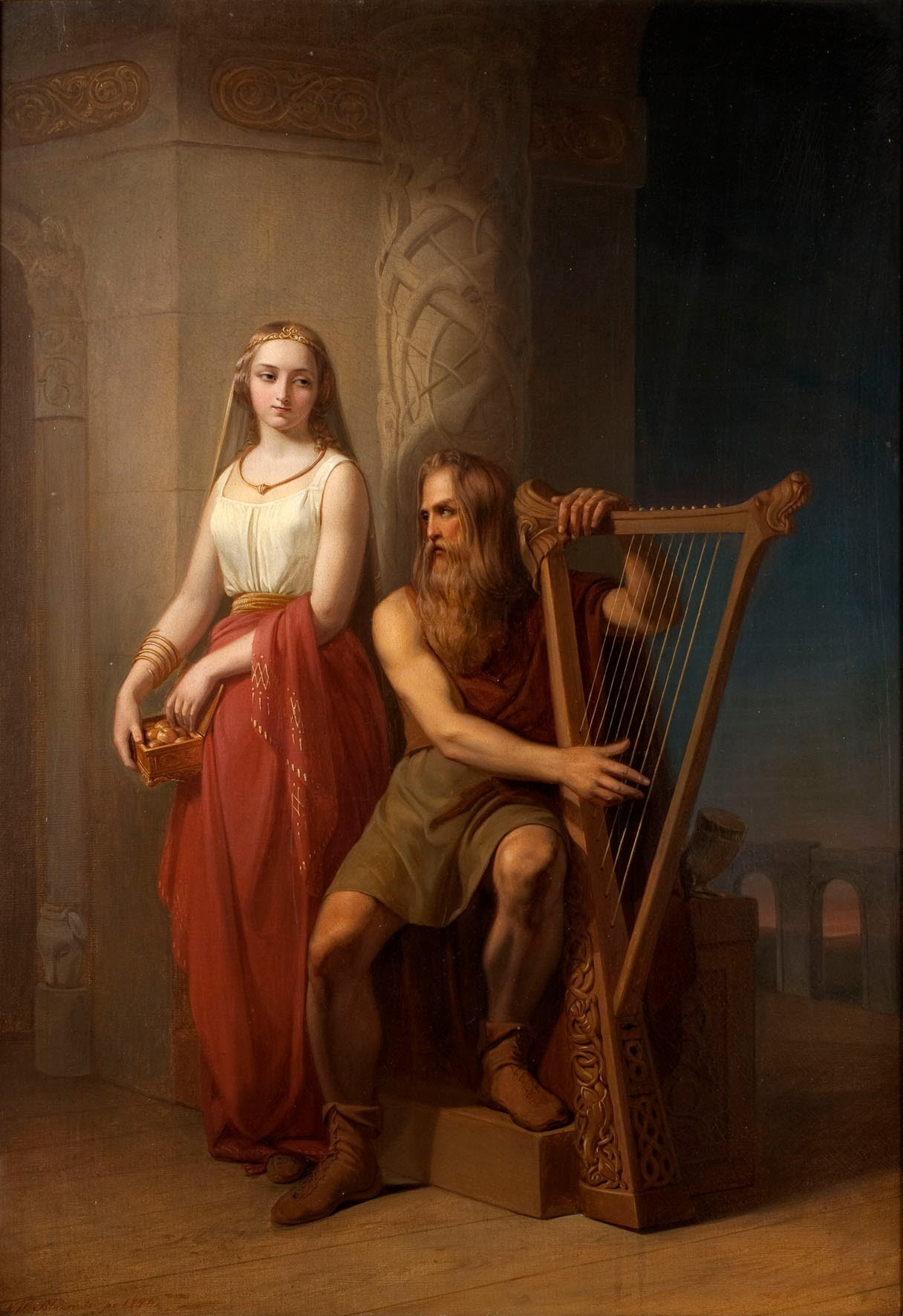
Bragi sitting playing the harp, Iðunn standing behind him (1846) by Nils Blommér

Iðunn appears in the Poetic Edda poem Lokasenna and, included in some modern editions of the Poetic Edda, in the late poem Hrafnagaldr Óðins.

Iðunn is introduced as Bragi's wife in the prose introduction to the poem Lokasenna, where the two attend a feast held by Ægir. In stanzas 16, 17, and 18, dialog occurs between Loki and Iðunn after Loki has insulted Bragi. In stanza 16, Iðunn (here anglicized as Idunn) says:

Idunn said:
I ask you, Bragi, to do a service to your blood-kin
and all the adoptive relations,
that you shouldn't say words of blame to Loki,
in Ægir's hall.

Loki said:
Be silent, Idunn, I declare that of all women
you're the most man-crazed,
since you placed your arms, washed bright,
about your brother's slayer

Idunn said:
I'm not saying words of blame to Loki,
in Ægir's hall
I quietened Bragi, made talkative with beer;
and all living things love him.

In this exchange, Loki has accused Iðunn of having slept with the killer of her brother. However, neither this brother nor killer are accounted for in any other surviving source. Afterward, the goddess Gefjon speaks up and the poem continues in turn.

In the poem Hrafnagaldr Óðins, additional information is given about Iðunn, though this information is otherwise unattested. Here, Iðunn is identified as descending from elves, as one of "Ivaldi's elder children" and as a dís who dwells in dales. Stanza 6 reads:

In the dales dwells,
the prescient Dís,
from Yggdrasil's
ash sunk down,
of alfen race,
Idun by name,
the youngest of Ivaldi's
elder children.

=== Prose Edda ===
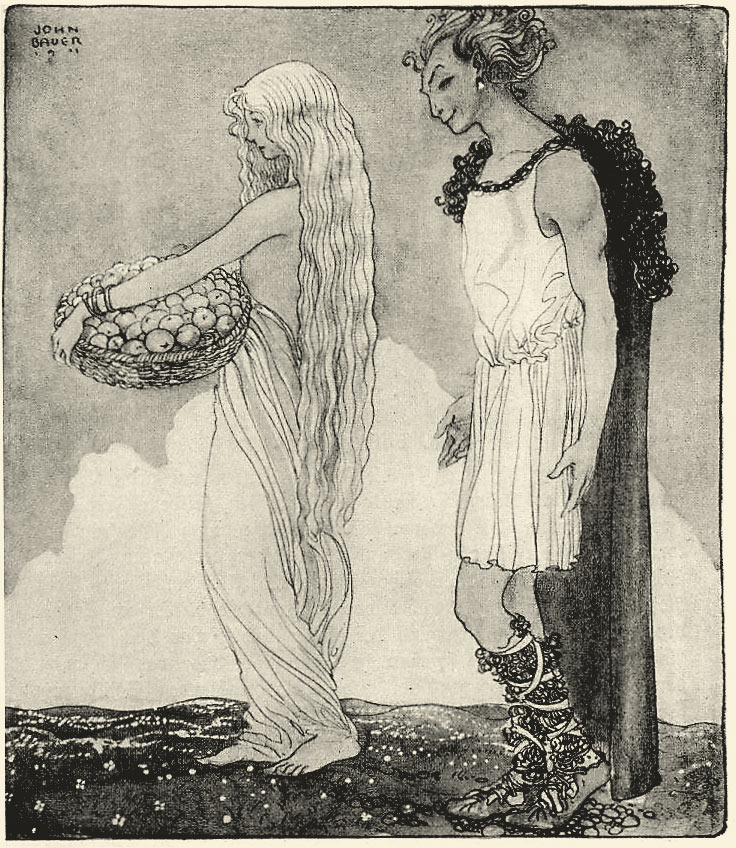
Loki and Idun (1911) by John Bauer

Iðunn is introduced in the Prose Edda in section 26 of the Prose Edda book Gylfaginning. Here, Iðunn is described as Bragi's wife and keeper of an eski (a wooden box made of ash wood and often used for carrying personal possessions) within which she keeps apples. The apples are bitten into by the gods when they begin to grow old and they then become young again, which is described as occurring up until Ragnarök. Gangleri (described as King Gylfi in disguise) states that it seems to him that the gods depend greatly upon Iðunn's good faith and care. With a laugh, High responds that misfortune once came close, that he could tell Gangleri about it, but first he must hear the names of more of the Æsir, and he continues providing information about gods.

In the book Skáldskaparmál, Idunn is mentioned in its first chapter (numbered as 55) as one of eight ásynjur (goddesses) sitting in their thrones at a banquet in Asgard for Ægir. In chapter 56, Bragi tells Ægir about Iðunn's abduction by the jötunn Þjazi. Bragi says that after hitting an eagle (Þjazi in disguise) with a pole, Loki finds himself stuck to the bird. Loki is pulled further and further into the sky, his feet banging against stones, gravel, and trees until, fearful that his arms will be pulled from their sockets, he roars for mercy, begging the eagle to set him free. The eagle agrees, but only on the condition that Loki make a solemn vow to lure Iðunn, bearing her apples of youth, from the safety of Asgard. Loki accepts Þjazi's conditions and returns to his friends Odin and Hœnir. At the time agreed upon by Loki and Þjazi, Loki lures Iðunn out of Asgard into "a certain forest", telling her that he has discovered some apples that she would find worth keeping, and furthermore that she should bring her own apples with her so that she may compare them with the apples he has discovered. Þjazi arrives in eagle shape, snatches Iðunn, flies away with her and takes her to his home, Þrymheimr.

The Æsir begin to grow grey and old at the disappearance of Idunn. The Æsir assemble at a thing where they ask one another when Iðunn had been seen last. The Æsir realize that the last time that Iðunn was seen was when she was going outside of Asgard with Loki, and so they have Loki arrested and brought to the thing. Loki is threatened with death and torture. Terrified, Loki says that if the goddess Freyja will lend him her "falcon shape" he will search for Iðunn in the land of Jötunheimr. Freyja lends the falcon shape to Loki, and with it he flies north to Jötunheimr. One day later, Loki arrives at Þjazi's home. There he discovers that Þjazi is out at sea in a boat, having left Iðunn at home alone. Loki transforms the goddess into a nut, grasps her in his claws, and flies away with her as fast as possible.

Þjazi, arriving home to discover Iðunn gone, resumes his eagle shape and flies off in pursuit of Loki, his mighty wings stirring up a storm as he does so. The Æsir, seeing a falcon flying with a nut clutched in its claws and hotly pursued by an eagle, make haste to pile up a great heap of wood shavings and set it alight. The falcon flies over the battlements of Asgard and drops down behind the wall. The eagle, however, overshoots the falcon, and unable to stop, plunges through the fire, setting light to his feathers, and falling to the ground within the gates of Asgard, whereat the Æsir set upon the jötunn and kill him, leading the narrator to comment "and this killing is greatly renowned."

In chapter 10, "husband of Iðunn" is given as a means of referring to Bragi. In chapter 86, means of referring to Iðunn are given: "wife of Bragi", "keeper of the apples", and her apples "the Æsir's age old cure". Additionally, in connection to the story of her abduction by Þjazi, she may be referred to as "Þjazi's booty". A passage of the 10th-century poem Haustlöng where the skald Þjóðólfr of Hvinir gives a lengthy description of a richly detailed shield he has received that features a depiction of the abduction of Iðunn. Within the cited portions of Haustlöng, Iðunn is referred to as "the maid who knew the Æsir's old age cure", "the gods' lady", "ale-Gefn", "the Æsir's girl-friend", and once by name.

In chapter 33, Iðunn is cited as one of the six ásynjur visiting Ægir. Iðunn appears a final time in the Prose Edda in chapter 75, where she appears in a list of ásynjur.

== Theories ==
=== Apples and fertility ===
Some surviving stories regarding Iðunn focus on her youth-maintaining apples. English scholar Hilda Ellis Davidson links apples to religious practices in Germanic paganism. She points out that buckets of apples were found in the 9th-century Oseberg ship burial site in Norway and that fruit and nuts (Iðunn having been described as being transformed into a nut in Skáldskaparmál) have been found in the early graves of the Germanic peoples in England and elsewhere on the continent of Europe which may have had a symbolic meaning and also that nuts are still a recognized symbol of fertility in Southwest England.

Davidson notes a connection between apples and the Vanir, a group of gods associated with fertility in Norse mythology, citing an instance of eleven "golden apples" being given to woo the beautiful Gerðr by Skírnir, who was acting as messenger for the major Vanir god Freyr in stanzas 19 and 20 of Skírnismál. In Skírnismál, Gerðr mentions her brother's slayer in stanza 16, which Davidson states has led to some suggestions that Gerðr may have been connected to Iðunn as they are similar in this way. Davidson also notes a further connection between fertility and apples in Norse mythology; in chapter 2 of the Völsunga saga when the major goddess Frigg sends King Rerir an apple after he prays to Odin for a child, Frigg's messenger (in the guise of a crow) drops the apple in his lap as he sits atop a mound. Rerir's wife's consumption of the apple results in a six-year pregnancy and the caesarean section birth of their son—the hero Völsung.

Davidson points out the "strange" phrase "apples of Hel" used in an 11th-century poem by the skald Þórbjörn Brúnason. Davidson states this may imply that the apple was thought of by the skald as the food of the dead. Further, Davidson notes that the potentially Germanic goddess Nehalennia is sometimes depicted with apples and parallels exist in early Irish stories. Davidson asserts that while cultivation of the apple in Northern Europe extends back to at least the time of the Roman Empire and came to Europe from the Near East, the native varieties of apple trees growing in Northern Europe are small and bitter. Davidson concludes that in the figure of Iðunn "we must have a dim reflection of an old symbol: that of the guardian goddess of the life-giving fruit of the other world."

=== Indo-European basis ===
David Knipe theorizes Iðunn's abduction by Thjazi in eagle form as an example of the Indo-European motif "of an eagle who steals the celestial means of immortality." In addition, Knipe says that "a parallel to the theft of Iðunn's apples (symbols of fertility) has been noted in the Celtic myth where Brian, Iuchar, and Icharba, the sons of Tuirenn, assume the guise of hawks in order to steal sacred apples from the garden of Hisberna. Here, too, there is pursuit, the guardians being female griffins."

=== Other ===
John Lindow theorizes that the possible etymological meaning of Iðunn—'ever young'—would potentially allow Iðunn to perform her ability to provide eternal youthfulness to the gods without her apples, and further states that Haustlöng does not mention apples but rather refers to Iðunn as the "maiden who understood the eternal life of the Æsir." Lindow further theorizes that Iðunn's abduction is "one of the most dangerous moments" for the gods, as the general movement of female jötnar to the gods would be reversed.

Regarding the accusations levelled towards Iðunn by Loki, Lee Hollander opines that Lokasenna was intended to be humorous and that the accusations thrown by Loki in the poem are not necessarily to be taken as "generally accepted lore" at the time it was composed. Rather they are charges that are easy for Loki to make and difficult for his targets to disprove, or which they do not care to refute.

In his study of the skaldic poem Haustlöng, Richard North comments that "[Iðunn] is probably to be understood as an aspect of Freyja, a goddess whom the gods rely on for their youth and beauty [...]".

== Modern influence ==
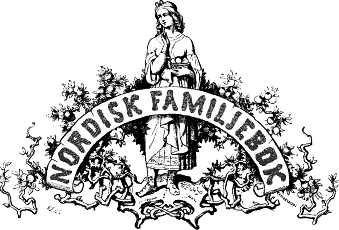
The logo of the first edition (1876) of the Swedish Encyclopedia Nordisk familjebok features a depiction of Iðunn

Iðunn has been the subject of a number of artistic depictions. These depictions include Idun (statue, 1821) by H. E. Freund, Idun (statue, 1843) and Idun som bortrövas av jätten Tjasse i örnhamn (plaster statue, 1856) by C. G. Qvarnström, Brage sittande vid harpan, Idun stående bakom honom (1846) by Nils Blommér, Iduns Rückkehr nach Valhalla by C. Hansen (resulting in an 1862 woodcut modeled on the painting by C. Hammer), Bragi und Idun, Balder und Nanna (drawing, 1882) by K. Ehrenberg, Idun and the Apples (1890) by J. Doyle Penrose, Brita as Iduna (1901) by Carl Larsson, Loki och Idun (1911) by John Bauer, Idun (watercolor, 1905) by B. E. Ward, and Idun (1901) by E. Doepler.

The 19th-century composer Richard Wagner's Der Ring des Nibelungen opera cycle features Freia, a version of the goddess Freyja combined with Iðunn.

Several publications have been named after the goddess. The publication of the United States–based Germanic neopagan group The Troth (Idunna, edited by Diana L. Paxson) derives its name from that of the goddess. The Swedish women's journal Idun depicted Idun with her basket of apples on its banner. Additionally, an American Swedish-language women's journal, Nya Idun ('New Idun'), was published from 1906 to 1924.

The asteroid 176 Iduna was named after the men's association Sällskapet Idun. Idunn Mons, a mons of the planet Venus, is named after Iðunn.

In 2024, the Swedish Maritime Administration renamed a recently acquired second-hand icebreaker Idun to reflect how the ship, decades younger than the other Swedish icebreakers, would "rejuvenate" the aging state-owned fleet.

== General and cited references ==
- Byock, Jesse (Trans.) (2006). The Prose Edda. Penguin Classics. ISBN 0-14-044755-5
- Ellis Davidson, H. R. (1965). Gods And Myths Of Northern Europe. Penguin. ISBN 0-14-013627-4
- Faulkes, Anthony (Trans.) (1995). Edda. Everyman. ISBN 0-460-87616-3
- Gräter, Friedrich David (Editor) (1812). Idunna und Hermode: ein alterthumszeitung. Breslau: Grass und Barth.
- Grimm, Jacob (James Steven Stallybrass Trans.) (1882). Teutonic Mythology: Translated from the Fourth Edition with Notes and Appendix by James Stallybrass. Volume I. London: George Bell and Sons.
- Hollander, Lee (Trans.) (1990). The Poetic Edda. University of Texas Press. ISBN 0-292-76499-5
- Knipe, David M. (1967). "The Heroic Myths from Rgveda IV and the Ancient near East" from History of Religions, Vol. 6, No. 4 (May 1967).
- Larrington, Carolyne (Trans.) (1999). The Poetic Edda. Oxford World's Classics. ISBN 0-19-283946-2
- Lindow, John (2001). Norse Mythology: A Guide to the Gods, Heroes, Rituals, and Beliefs. Oxford University Press. ISBN 0-19-515382-0.
- North, Richard (1997). The Haustlǫng of Þjóðólfr of Hvinir. Hisarlik Press. ISBN 1874312206.
- Orchard, Andy (1997). Dictionary of Norse Myth and Legend. Cassell. ISBN 0-304-34520-2
- Rabinovitch, Shelley. Lewis, James (2004). Encyclopedia Of Modern Witchcraft And Neo-Paganism. Citadel. ISBN 0-8065-2407-3
- Simek, Rudolf (2007) translated by Angela Hall. Dictionary of Northern Mythology. D.S. Brewer. ISBN 0-85991-513-1
- Thorpe, Benjamin (Trans.) (1866). Edda Sæmundar Hinns Frôða: The Edda of Sæmund the Learned. Part I. London: Trübner & Co.
- Thorpe, Benjamin (Trans.). Blackwell, I. A. (Trans.) (1907). The Elder Edda of Saemund Sigfusson and the Younger Edda of Snorre Sturleson. Norrœna Society.
- Turville-Petre, E. O. G. (1964). Myth and Religion of the North: The Religion of Ancient Scandinavia. Holt, Rinehart and Winston.
- Yonge, Charlotte Mary (1884). History of Christian Names. Macmillan and Co.
