= Sapas Mons =

Volcano on Venus

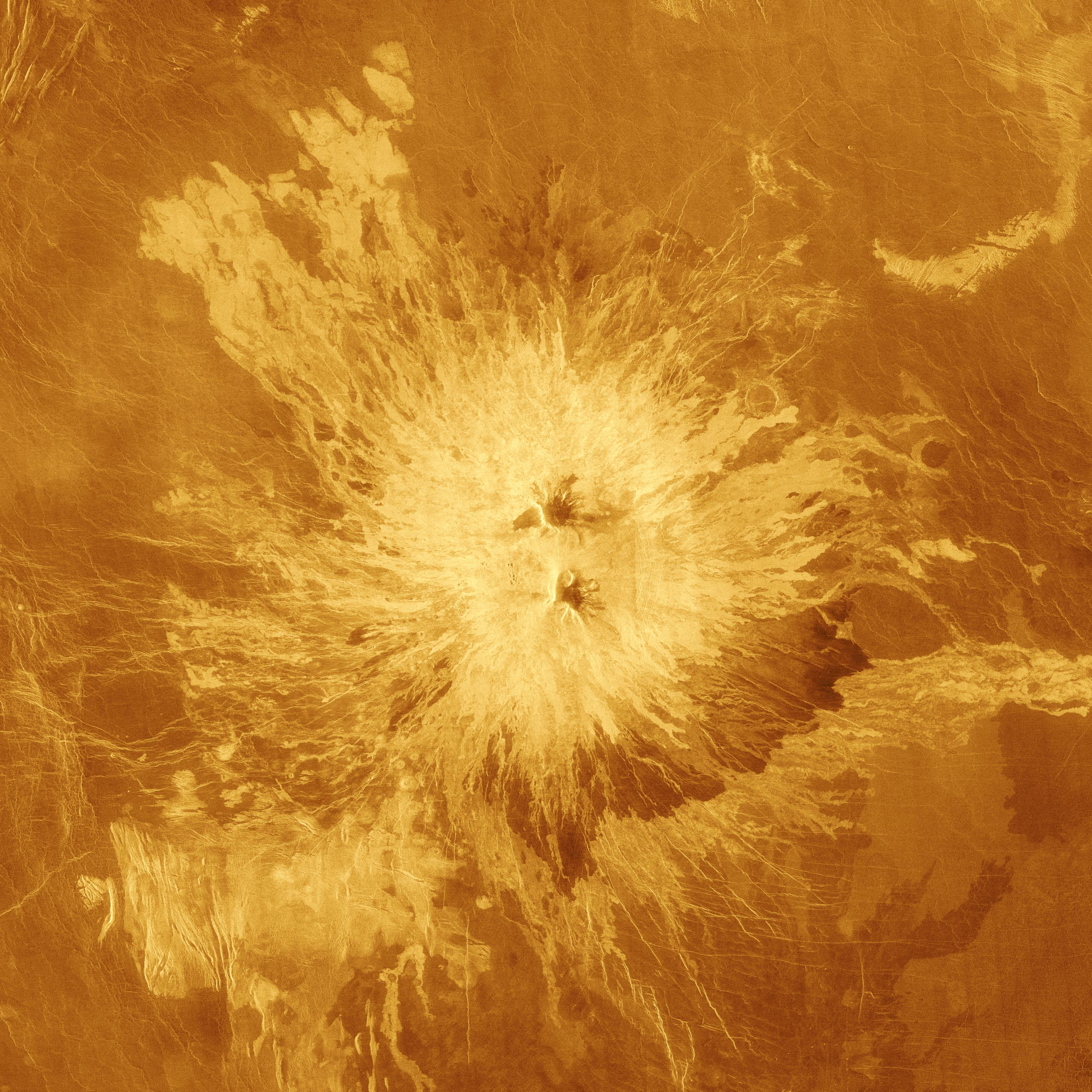
- Radar image of Sapas Mons
- Feature type: Mountain
- Coordinates: 8.5°N 188.3°E
- Diameter: 217 km
- Eponym: Sapas

Sapas Mons is a large volcano located in the Atla Regio region of Venus.

== Description ==
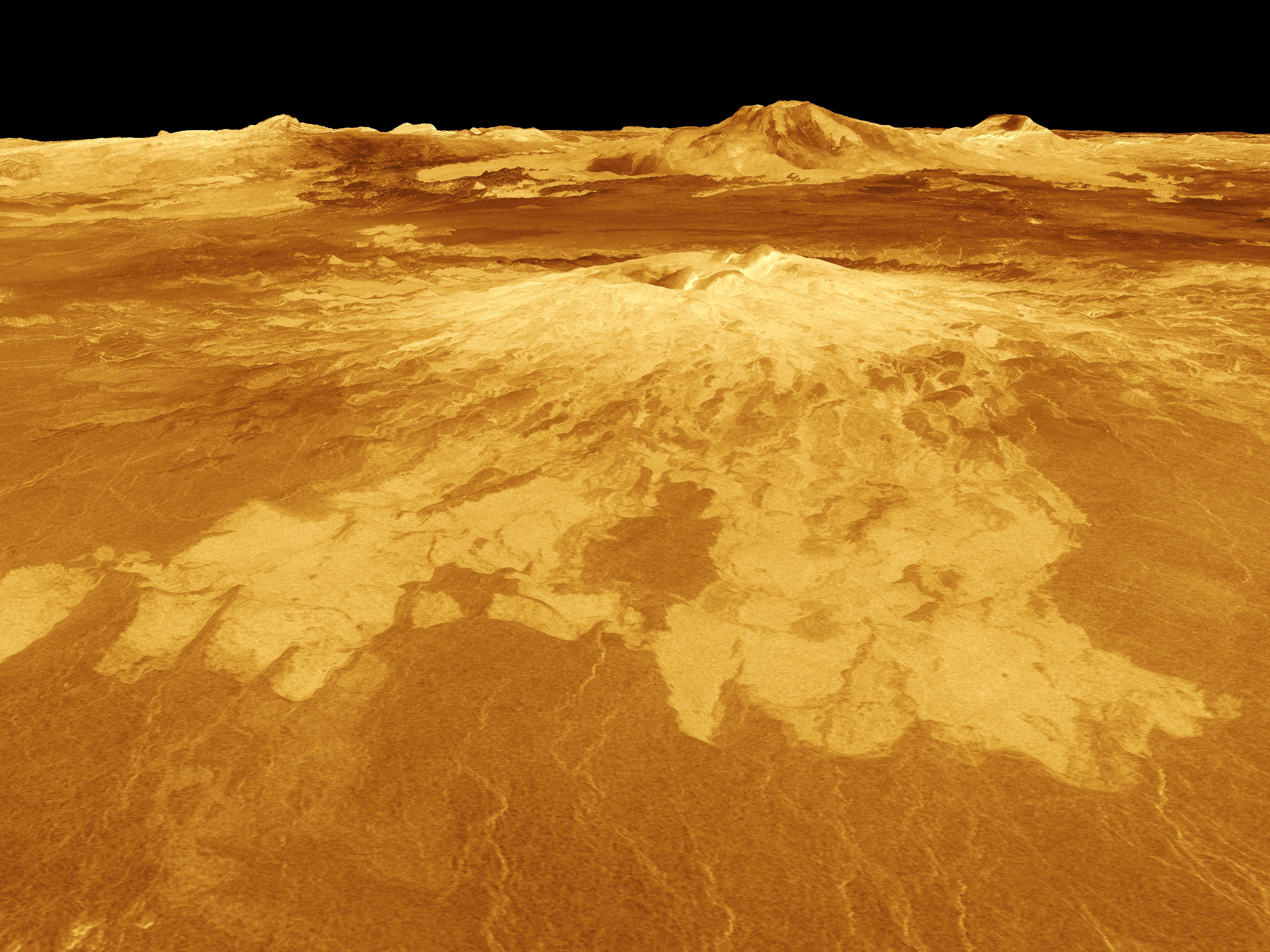
A computer-generated image of Sapas Mons, viewed from the northwest

Sapas is named after the Canaanite sun goddess. It measures about 400 kilometers (250 mi) across and 1.5 kilometers (0.93 mi) high, being located at approximately 8 degrees north latitude, 188 degrees east longitude, on the western edge of Atla Regio. Its peak has an elevation of 4.5 kilometers (2.8 mi) relative to the planet's mean elevation.

Its flanks show numerous overlapping lava flows. The dark flows on the lower right of the radar image are thought to be smoother than the brighter ones near the central part of the volcano. Many of the flows appear to have been erupted along the flanks of the volcano rather than from the double summit. This type of flank eruption is common on large volcanoes on Earth, such as the Hawaiian volcanoes.

The summit area has two flat-topped mesas, whose smooth tops give a relatively dark appearance in the radar image. Also seen near the summit are groups of pits, some as large as 1 kilometer (0.62 mi) across. These are thought to have formed when underground chambers of magma were drained through other subsurface tubes and lead to a collapse at the surface.

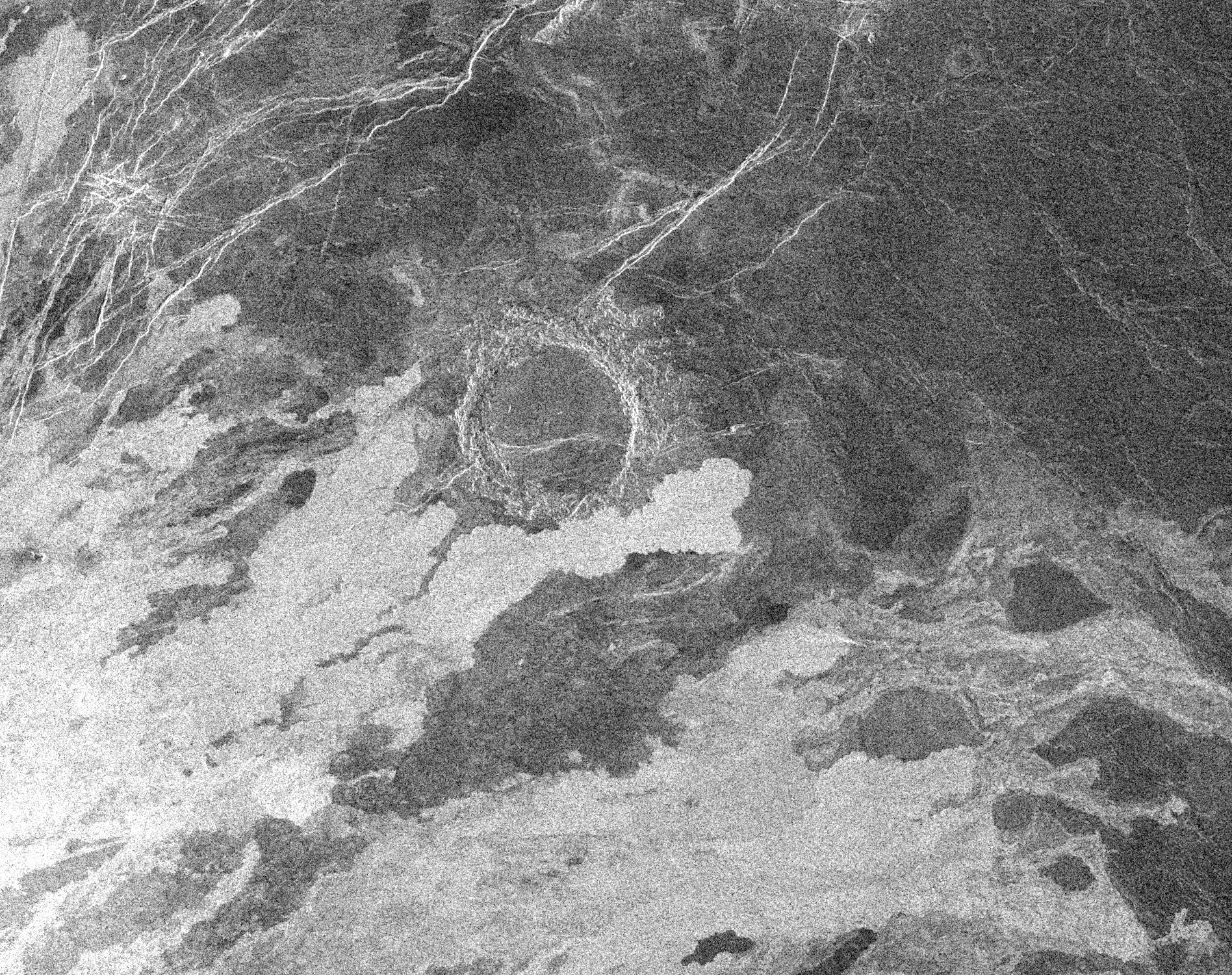
East part of Sapas Mons with the flooded crater Zamudio

A 20-kilometer-diameter (12 mi) impact crater northeast of the volcano is partially buried by the lava flows.

Little was known about Atla Regio prior to the Magellan probe. The new data, acquired in February 1991, show the region to be composed of at least five large volcanoes such as Sapas Mons, which are commonly linked by complex systems of fractures or rift zones. If comparable to similar features on Earth, Atla Regio probably formed when large volumes of molten rock upwelled from areas within the interior of Venus known as 'hot spots.'
