= Kaj Aage Gunnar Strand =

Danish-American astronomer (1907–2000)

Kaj Strand
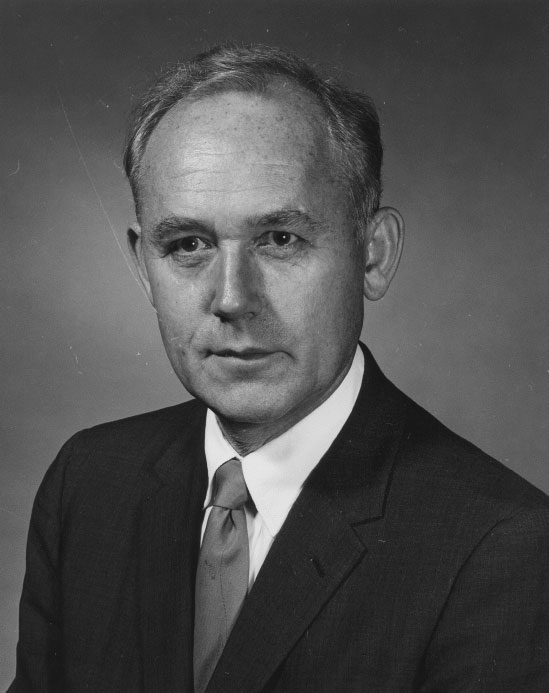
- Born: February 27, 1907; Hellerup, Copenhagen, Denmark
- Died: October 31, 2000 (aged 93); Washington, D.C., United States
- Education: University of Copenhagen (BA, MSc, PhD)
- Spouse: Emilie Rashevsky Strand (m. 1949)
- Children: 2
- Scientific career
- Fields: Astronomy
- Workplaces: Swarthmore College; Sproul Observatory; Yerkes Observatory; Northwestern University; United States Naval Observatory

Kaj Aage Gunnar Strand (27 February 1907 – 31 October 2000) was a Danish-born naturalized American astronomer known for his work in positional astronomy and for serving as the scientific director of the United States Naval Observatory from 1963 to 1977. His work focused especially on double stars and stellar distances.

== Early life and education ==
Kaj Strand was born on February 27, 1907, in Hellerup, on the outskirts of Copenhagen, Denmark, to Constance (née Malmgren) and Viggo Peter Strand, a goldsmith who owned a jewellery store. He entered the University of Copenhagen in 1926, majored in astronomy, and graduated in 1931 with Magister (Master's) and Candidate Magister degrees. At the invitation of Ejnar Hertzsprung, during the 1930s he worked at Leiden on a program of photographing double stars; he applied these results toward his doctorate from Copenhagen in 1938.

== Career ==
From 1938 to 1942 Strand worked under Peter van de Kamp as a research associate at Swarthmore College, and began the photographic double star program with the 24 in (61 cm) refractor telescope at the college's Sproul Observatory. During World War II he entered the U.S. Army, and then the U.S. Army Air Force, and flew as a Captain and chief navigator on B-29 Superfortress tests. As head of the Navigation Department he was involved in operational training of special air crews, including the first atomic bomb crew.

After the war Strand returned briefly to Swarthmore College, and in 1946 began as an associate professor at Yerkes Observatory. In the same year he became chairman of the Astronomy Department at Northwestern University, and was responsible for planning the University's new computer center. In 1958 Strand accepted a position as head of the Astrometry and Astrophysics Division at the U.S. Naval Observatory rising to the position of Scientific Director in 1963. He pioneered in the determination of stellar distances using reflecting telescopes, and was primarily responsible for the design and construction of the 61 in (1.5 m) Strand Astrometric Telescope, dedicated in 1964 at the United States Naval Observatory Flagstaff Station in Arizona.

== Claim of extrasolar planets ==
Strand is also known for his 1942 and 1957 claims of a planetary system around the nearby star 61 Cygni while working under the direction of Peter van de Kamp at the Sproul Observatory. These claims were later refuted by Wulff Heintz, also of the Sproul Observatory.

== Honors and awards ==
Strand was awarded the Guggenheim Fellowship in 1946.
The main-belt asteroid, 3236 Strand (1982 BH1), is named for him. It was discovered on January 24, 1982, by E. Bowell at Lowell Observatory, Anderson Mesa Station in Flagstaff, Arizona.

== Personal life and death ==
He died October 31, 2000, in Washington, D.C., at the age of 93.

== See also ==
- Peter van de Kamp
- Barnard's Star
