= 61 Cygni =

Binary star system in the Cygnus constellation

- Location of 61 Cygni (circled)

Observation data Epoch J2000 Equinox ICRS
- Constellation: Cygnus
- 61 Cygni A
- Right ascension: 21^{h} 06^{m} 53.9396^{s}
- Declination: +38° 44′ 57.902″
- Apparent magnitude (V): 5.21
- 61 Cygni B
- Right ascension: 21^{h} 06^{m} 55.2638^{s}
- Declination: +38° 44′ 31.359″
- Apparent magnitude (V): 6.05

Characteristics

61 Cyg A
- Evolutionary stage: main sequence
- Spectral type: K5V
- U−B color index: +1.155
- B−V color index: +1.139
- Variable type: BY Dra

61 Cyg B
- Evolutionary stage: main sequence
- Spectral type: K7V
- U−B color index: +1.242
- B−V color index: +1.320
- Variable type: Flare star

Astrometry

61 Cygni A
Radial velocity (R_{v})	−65.97±0.12 km/s
Proper motion (μ)	RA: 4,164.209 mas/yr Dec.: 3,249.614 mas/yr
Parallax (π)	285.9949±0.0599 mas
Distance	11.404 ± 0.002 ly (3.4966 ± 0.0007 pc)
Absolute magnitude (M_{V})	7.506

61 Cygni B
Radial velocity (R_{v})	−64.59±0.12 km/s
Proper motion (μ)	RA: 4,105.976 mas/yr Dec.: 3,155.942 mas/yr
Parallax (π)	286.0054±0.0289 mas
Distance	11.404 ± 0.001 ly (3.4964 ± 0.0004 pc)
Absolute magnitude (M_{V})	8.228

Orbit
Period (P)	707.1+4.5 −4.4 years
Semi-major axis (a)	86.76+0.16 −0.15 au
Eccentricity (e)	0.4424+0.0056 −0.0057
Inclination (i)	52.99±0.12°
Longitude of the node (Ω)	355.73±0.30°
Periastron epoch (T)	JD = 2596496+1255 −1213
Argument of periastron (ω) (secondary)	150.61+0.68 −0.67°

Details

61 Cygni A
Mass	0.6771+0.0052 −0.0051 M_{☉}
Radius	0.667±0.005 R_{☉}
Luminosity	0.150±0.004 L_{☉}
Surface gravity (log g)	4.63±0.01 cgs
Temperature	4,398±34 K
Metallicity [Fe/H]	−0.13±0.03 dex
Rotation	35.54±0.47 days
Age	6.1±1.0 Gyr

61 Cygni B
Mass	0.6289+0.0094 −0.0092 M_{☉}
Radius	0.594±0.008 R_{☉}
Luminosity	0.097±0.003 L_{☉}
Surface gravity (log g)	4.68±0.02 cgs
Temperature	4,174±47 K
Metallicity [Fe/H]	−0.21±0.07 dex
Rotation	34.55±0.57 days
Age	6.1±1.0 Gyr

Other designations
- GJ 820 A/B, Struve 2758, ADS 14636, V1803 Cygni, GCTP 5077.00
- 61 Cygni A: V1803 Cygni, HD 201091, HIP 104214, HR 8085, BD+38°4343, LHS 62, SAO 70919
- 61 Cygni B: HD 201092, HIP 104217, HR 8086, BD+38°4344, LHS 63

Database references
SIMBAD	The system
- A
- B

61 Cygni /ˈsɪɡni/ is a binary star system in the northern constellation Cygnus, consisting of a pair of K-type dwarf stars that orbit each other in a period of about 659 years. Of apparent magnitude 5.20 and 6.05, respectively, they can be seen with binoculars in city skies or with the naked eye in rural areas without light pollution.

61 Cygni first attracted the attention of astronomers when its large proper motion was first demonstrated by Giuseppe Piazzi in 1804. In 1838, Friedrich Bessel measured its distance from Earth at about 10.4 light-years, very close to the actual value of about 11.4 light-years; this was the first distance estimate for any star other than the Sun, and the first star to have its stellar parallax measured. Among all stars or stellar systems listed in the latest Gaia catalogues, 61 Cygni has the sixth-highest proper motion, and the highest among all naked-eye visible stars. (Note: By convention, limiting visual magnitude of 6.0.)

Over the course of the twentieth century, several different astronomers reported evidence of a massive planet orbiting one of the two stars, but recent high-precision radial velocity observations have shown that all such claims were unfounded. No planets have been confirmed in this stellar system to date.

== Name ==
61 Cygni is relatively dim, so it does not appear on ancient star maps, nor is it given a name in western or Chinese systems.

The name "61 Cygni" is part of the Flamsteed designation assigned to stars. According to this designation scheme, devised by John Flamsteed to catalog his observations, stars of a particular constellation are numbered in the order of their right ascension, not in Greek letters as the Bayer designation does. The star does not appear under that name in Flamsteed's Historia Coelestis Britannica, although it has been stated by him that 61 Cygni actually corresponds to what he referred to as 85 Cygni in the 1712 edition. It has also been called "Bessel's Star", "Piazzi's Flying Star", or "Flying Star".

== Observation history ==
=== Early observations ===
The first well recorded observation of the star system using optical instruments was made by James Bradley on 25 September 1753, when he noticed that it was a double star. William Herschel began systematic observations of 61 Cygni as part of a wider study of binary stars. His observations led to the conclusion that binary stars were separated enough that they would show different movements in parallax over the year, and hoped to use this as a way to measure the distance to the stars.

61 Cygni showing proper motion (movement from our vantage point) at some early 21st century one-year intervals.

In 1792, Giuseppe Piazzi noticed the high proper motion when he compared his own observations of 61 Cygni with those of Bradley, made 40 years earlier. This led to considerable interest in 61 Cygni by contemporary astronomers, and its continual observation since that date. Piazzi's repeated measurements led to a definitive value of its motion, which he published in 1804.

It was in this record he christened the system as the "Flying Star".

Piazzi noted that this motion meant that it was probably one of the closest stars, and suggested it would be a prime candidate for an attempt to determine its distance through parallax measurements, along with two other possibilities, Delta Eridani and Mu Cassiopeiae.

=== Parallax measurement ===
A number of astronomers soon took up the task, including attempts by François Arago and Claude-Louis Mathieu in 1812, who recorded the parallax at 500 milliarcseconds (mas), and Christian Heinrich Friedrich Peters used Arago's data to calculate a value of 550 mas. Peters calculated a better value based on observations made by Bernhard von Lindenau at Seeburg between 1812 and 1814; he calculated it to be 470 ±510 mas. Von Lindenau had already noted that he had seen no parallax, and as Friedrich Georg Wilhelm von Struve pointed out after his own test series between 1818 and 1821, all of these numbers are more accurate than the accuracy of the instrument used.

Friedrich Wilhelm Bessel made a notable contribution in 1812 when he used a different method to measure distance. Assuming the orbital period of the two stars in the binary to be 400 years, he estimated the distance between the two this would require, and then measured the angular distance between the stars. This led to a value of 460 mas. He then followed this up with direct parallax measurements in a series of observations between 1815 and 1816, comparing it with six other stars. The two sets of measurements produced values of 760 and 1320 mas. All of these estimates, like earlier attempts by others, retained inaccuracies greater than the measurements.

When Joseph von Fraunhofer invented a new type of heliometer, Bessel carried out another set of measurements using this device in 1837 and 1838 at Königsberg. He published his findings in 1838 with a value of 369.0 ±19.1 mas to A and 260.5 ±18.8 to B, and estimated the center point to be at 313.6 ±13.6. This corresponds to a distance of about 600,000 astronomical units, or about 10.4 light-years. This was the first direct and reliable measurement of the distance to a star other than the Sun. His measurement was published only shortly before similar parallax measurements of Vega by Friedrich Georg Wilhelm von Struve and Alpha Centauri by Thomas Henderson that same year. Bessel continued to make additional measurements at Königsberg, publishing a total of four complete observational runs, the last in 1868. The best of these placed the center point at 360.2 ±12.1 mas, made during observations in 1849. This is close to the currently accepted value of 287.18 mas (yielding 11.36 light-years).

Only a few years after Bessel's measurement, in 1842 Friedrich Wilhelm Argelander noted that Groombridge 1830 had an even larger proper motion, and 61 Cygni became the second highest known. It was later moved further down the list by Kapteyn's Star and Barnard's Star. 61 Cygni has the sixth highest proper motion of all stellar systems listed in the latest Gaia catalogues, but retains the title of highest proper motion among stars visible to the naked eye.

=== Binary observations ===
Due to the wide angular separation between 61 Cygni A and B, and the correspondingly slow orbital motion, it was initially unclear whether the two stars in the 61 Cygni system were a gravitationally bound system or simply a juxtaposition of stars. von Struve first argued for its status as a binary in 1830, but the matter remained open.

However, by 1917 refined measured parallax differences demonstrated that the separation was significantly less. The binary nature of this system was clear by 1934, and orbital elements were published.

In 1911, Benjamin Boss published data indicating that the 61 Cygni system was a member of a comoving group of stars. This group containing 61 Cygni was later expanded to include 26 potential members. Possible members include Beta Columbae, Pi Mensae, 14 Tauri and 68 Virginis. The space velocities of this group of stars range from 105 to 114 km/s relative to the Sun.

Observations taken by planet search programs show that both components have strong linear trends in the radial velocity measurements.

== Amateur observation ==
An observer using 7×50 binoculars can find 61 Cygni two binocular fields southeast of the bright star Deneb. The angular separation of the two stars is slightly greater than the angular size of Saturn (16–20″). So, under ideal viewing conditions, the binary system can be resolved by a telescope with a 7 mm aperture. (Note: Per the Rayleigh criterion: $$\begin{matrix}\alpha_R\ =\ \frac{138}{D}\end{matrix}$$ mm.) This is well within the capability for aperture of typical binoculars, though to resolve the binary these need a steady mount and some 10x magnification. With a separation of 28 arc-seconds between the component stars, 10× magnification would give an apparent separation of 280 arc-seconds, above the generally regarded eye resolution limit of 4 arc-minutes or 240 arc-seconds.

== Properties ==
Although it appears to be a single star to the naked eye, 61 Cygni is a widely-separated binary star system, composed of two K class (orange) main sequence stars, the brighter 61 Cygni A and fainter 61 Cygni B, which have apparent magnitudes of 5.2 and 6.0, respectively. Both appear to be old-disk stars, with an estimated age that is older than the Sun. At a distance of just over 11 light-years, it is the 15th-nearest-known star system to the Earth (not including the Sun). 61 Cygni A is the fourth-nearest star that is visible to the naked eye for mid-latitude northern observers, after Sirius, Epsilon Eridani, and Procyon A. This system will make its closest approach at about 20,000 CE, when the separation from the Sun will be about 9 light-years.

Smaller and dimmer than the Sun, 61 Cygni A has about 70 percent of a solar mass, 72 percent of its diameter and about 8.5 percent of its luminosity and 61 Cygni B has about 63 percent of a solar mass, 67 percent of its diameter, and 3.9 percent of its luminosity. 61 Cygni A's long-term stability led to it being selected as an "anchor star" in the Morgan–Keenan (MK) classification system in 1943, serving as the K5 V "anchor point" since that time. Starting in 1953, 61 Cygni B has been considered a K7 V standard star (Johnson & Morgan 1953, Keenan & McNeil 1989).

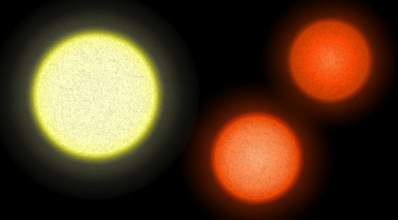
A size comparison between the Sun (left), 61 Cygni A (bottom) and 61 Cygni B (upper right).

The two stars orbit their common barycenter in a period of 659 years, with a mean separation of about 84 AU—84 times the separation between the Earth and the Sun. The relatively large orbital eccentricity of 0.48 means that the two stars are separated by about 44 AU at periapsis and 124 AU at apoapsis. (Note: At periapsis: $$\begin{matrix}r_{per}\ =\ (1\ -\ e)\cdot a\ \approx\ 44\end{matrix}$$ AU At apoapsis: $$\begin{matrix}r_{ap}\ =\ (1\ +\ e)\cdot a\ \approx\ 124\end{matrix}$$ AU) The leisurely orbit of the pair has made it difficult to pin down their respective masses, and the accuracy of these values remain somewhat controversial. In the future this issue may be resolved through the use of asteroseismology. 61 Cygni A has about 11% more mass than 61 Cygni B.

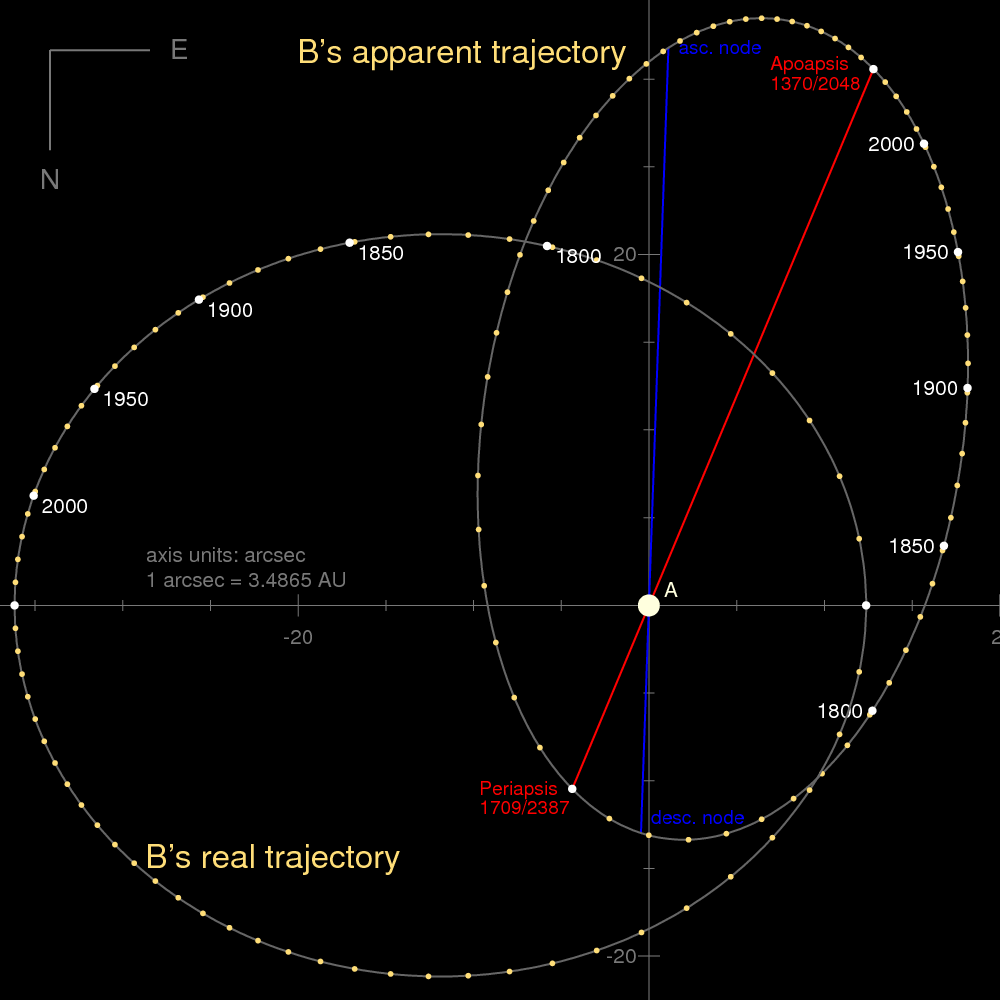
The orbital motion of component B relative to component A as seen from Earth as well as the true appearance from face-on view. The time steps are approximately 10 years.

The system has an activity cycle that is much more pronounced than the solar sunspot cycle. This is a complex activity cycle that varies with a period of about 7.5±1.7 years. The starspot activity combined with rotation and chromospheric activity is a characteristic of a BY Draconis variable. Because of differential rotation, this star's surface rotation period varies by latitude from 27 to 45 days, with an average period of 35 days.

61 Cygni B displays a more chaotic pattern of variability than A, with significant short-term flares. There is an 11.7-year periodicity to the overall activity cycle of B. Both stars exhibit stellar flare activity, but the chromosphere of B is 25% more active than for 61 Cygni A. As a result of differential rotation, the period of rotation varies by latitude from 32 to 47 days, with an average period of 38 days.

The outflow of the stellar wind from component A produces a bubble within the local interstellar cloud. Along the direction of the star's motion within the Milky Way, this extends out to a distance of 30 AU, or roughly the orbital distance of Neptune from the Sun. This is lower than the separation between the two components of 61 Cygni, and so the two most likely do not share a common astrosphere. The compactness of the astrosphere is likely due to the low mass outflow and the relatively high velocity through the local interstellar medium.

There is some disagreement over the evolutionary age of this system. Kinematic data gives an age estimate of about 10 Gyr. Gyrochronology, or the age determination of a star based on its rotation and color, results in an average age of 2.0 ±0.2 Gyr. The ages based on chromospheric activity for A and B are 2.36 Gyr and 3.75 Gyr, respectively. Finally the age estimates using the isochrone method, which involve fitting the stars to evolutionary models, yield upper limits of 0.44 Gyr and 0.68 Gyr. However, a 2008 evolutionary model using the CESAM2k code from the Côte d'Azur Observatory gives an age estimate of 6.0 ±1.0 Gyr for the pair.

The habitable zone for 61 Cygni A, defined as the locations where liquid water could be present on an Earth-like planet, is 0.26–0.58 AU. For 61 Cygni B, the habitable zone is 0.24–0.50 AU.

== Possible planetary system ==
=== Search for planets ===
On different occasions, it has been claimed that 61 Cygni might have unseen low-mass companions, planets or a brown dwarf. Kaj Strand of the Sproul Observatory, under the direction of Peter van de Kamp, made the first such claim in 1942 using observations to detect tiny but systematic variations in the orbital motions of 61 Cygni A and B. These perturbations suggested that a third body of about 16 Jupiter masses must be orbiting 61 Cygni A. Reports of this third body served as inspiration for the planet Mesklin in Hal Clement's 1953 science fiction novel Mission of Gravity. In 1957, van de Kamp narrowed his uncertainties, claiming that the object had a mass of eight times that of Jupiter, a calculated orbital period of 4.8 years, and a semi-major axis of 2.4 AU, where 1 AU is the average distance from the Earth to the Sun. In 1977, Soviet astronomers at the Pulkovo Observatory near Saint Petersburg suggested that the system included three planets: two giant planets with six and twelve Jupiter masses around 61 Cygni A, and one giant planet with seven Jupiter masses around 61 Cygni B.

In 1978, Wulff-Dieter Heintz of the Sproul Observatory proved that these claims were spurious, as they were unable to detect any evidence of such motion down to six percent of the Sun's mass—equivalent to about 60 times the mass of Jupiter.

In 2018, a research team led by Pierre Kervella analyzed and compared proper motion data of the two stars obtained by the Hipparcos space telescope and the second data release of the Gaia space telescope (Gaia DR2). They found a significant mismatch in expected motion and position of 61 Cygni B relative to its companion. Taken together, these anomalies suggest the possible presence of a perturbing third object in orbit around 61 Cygni B. A follow-up work by the same team in 2022 using Gaia's early third data release (Gaia EDR3) also found evidence of the third body from proper motion anomaly of the system's barycenter, but was unable to determine which star it orbits. However, some subsequent works found the astrometric data of the two stars to be consistent with a binary system, with no third body.

In 2026, a team led by Aniket Sanghi combined the Hipparcos-Gaia proper motion anomaly found by Kervella's team with Gaia's renormalized unit weighted error (RUWE) parameter (which determines the quality of the astrometric properties such as parallax and proper motions), imaging observations with adaptive optics, radial velocity data spanning four decades, as well as N-body simulations, in order to constrain the possible properties of the candidate third body. The available data is consistent with a super-Jupiter orbiting at a semi-major axis of 8±3 au and with a mass of 8±3 M_{J}. It remains unknown which star the candidate planet orbits.

The 61 Cygni A or B planetary system
Companion (in order from star)	Mass	Semimajor axis (AU)	Orbital period (days)	Eccentricity	Inclination (°)	Radius
b (unconfirmed)	8±3 M_{J}	8±3	—	—	—	1.02±0.02 R_{J}

It has been shown that through the use of high precision relative astrometry between the two stars, it is possible to detect a low mass planet within their habitable zones.

=== Refining planetary boundaries ===
Since no certain planetary object has been detected around either star so far, McDonald Observatory team has set limits to the presence of one or more planets around 61 Cygni A and 61 Cygni B with masses between 0.07 and 2.1 Jupiter masses and average separations spanning between 0.05 and 5.2 AU.

Because of the proximity of this system to the Sun, it is a frequent target of interest for astronomers. Both stars were selected by NASA as "Tier 1" targets for the canceled optical Space Interferometry Mission. More recently, both stars have been listed among 164 target stars for the proposed Habitable Worlds Observatory.

Measurements of this system appeared to have detected an excess of far infrared radiation, beyond what is emitted by the stars. Such an excess is sometimes associated with a disk of dust, but in this case it lies sufficiently close to one or both of the stars that it has not been resolved with a telescope. A 2011 study using the Keck Interferometer Nuller failed to detect any exozodiacal dust around 61 Cygni A.

=== Object for biosignature research ===
The two stars are among five nearby stars listed among those K-type stars of a type in a 'sweet spot' between Sun-analog stars and M stars for the likelihood of evolved life, per analysis of Giada Arney from NASA's Goddard Space Flight Center.

== See also ==
- List of nearest stars
- Barnard's Star
