= Ross 614 =

Binary star in the constellation Monoceros

- Location of Ross 614 in the constellation Monoceros

Observation data Epoch J2000 Equinox ICRS
- Constellation: Monoceros
- CCDM J06294-0249 A
- Right ascension: 06^{h} 29^{m} 23.401^{s}
- Declination: −02° 48′ 50.32″
- Apparent magnitude (V): 11.15
- CCDM J06294-0249 B
- Right ascension: 06^{h} 29^{m} 23.52^{s}
- Declination: −02° 48′ 51.1″
- Apparent magnitude (V): 14.23

Characteristics

A
- Spectral type: M4.5V
- Variable type: Flare star (UV Cet)

B
- Spectral type: M8V
- Variable type: Flare star (UV Cet)

Astrometry

A
Radial velocity (R_{v})	16.70±0.20 km/s
Proper motion (μ)	RA: +750.14 mas/yr Dec.: −802.947 mas/yr
Parallax (π)	242.9659±0.8833 mas
Distance	13.42 ± 0.05 ly (4.12 ± 0.01 pc)
Absolute magnitude (M_{V})	13.09±0.04

B
Proper motion (μ)	RA: +707 mas/yr Dec.: −703 mas/yr
Absolute magnitude (M_{V})	16.17±0.06

Orbit
Period (P)	16.586±0.004 yr
Semi-major axis (a)	1.1012±0.0082" (4.187+0.008 −0.009 AU)
Eccentricity (e)	0.382±0.0001
Inclination (i)	52.918±0.016°
Longitude of the node (Ω)	210.385+0.030 −0.031°
Periastron epoch (T)	2445226.863+3.020 −3.043
Argument of periastron (ω) (secondary)	220.898±0.023°
Semi-amplitude (K_{1}) (primary)	2.201+0.016 −0.025 km/s

Details

Ross 614 A
Mass	0.2228±0.0055 M_{☉}
Radius	0.238±0.017 R_{☉}
Luminosity	0.007 L_{☉}
Temperature	3,193±100 K
Rotation	≤2.72+0.74 −0.57 days
Rotational velocity (v sin i)	4.73 km/s

Ross 614 B
Mass	94.837+0.880 −1.370 M_{Jup}
Radius	0.11 (Note: Calculated, using the Stefan-Boltzmann law and the star's effective temperature and luminosity, with respect to the solar nominal effective temperature of 5,772 K: $$\sqrt{\biggl(\frac{5,772}{3,145}\biggr)^4 \cdot 0.001} = 0.11\ R_\odot.$$) R_{☉}
Radius	74,000 km
Luminosity	0.001 L_{☉}
Temperature	3,145 K

Other designations
- Ross 614, CCDM J06294-0249, GJ 234, GCTP 1509.00, G 106-049, HIP 30920, LFT 473, LPM 239, LTT 2564, NLTT 16580, V577 Monocerotis
- Ross 614 A: LHS 1849
- Ross 614 B: LHS 1850

Database references
SIMBAD	The system
- A
- B

Ross 614 (V577 Monocerotis) is a red dwarf UV Ceti flare star and it is the primary member of a nearby binary star system in the constellation of Monoceros. It is among the nearest stars at a measured distance of about 13.4 light years (4.10 parsecs), but despite this close distance, is invisible to the naked eye, being of apparent magnitude 11. Because this star is so close to the Earth it is often the subject of study, hence the large number of designations by which it is known.

== Binary star system ==
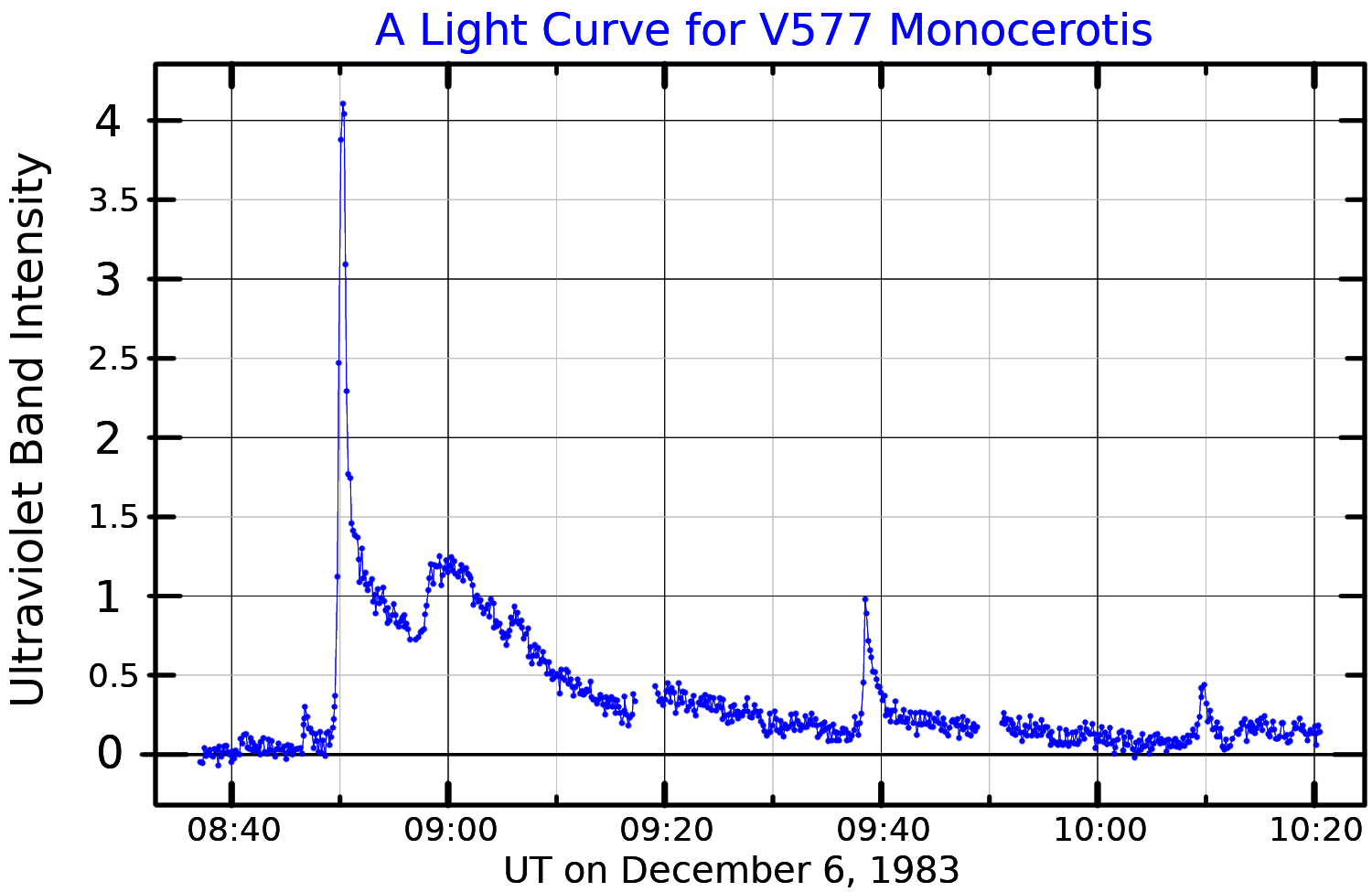
An ultraviolet band light curve for V577 Monocerotis showing several flares, adapted from Pettersen and Sundland (1991)

This binary star system consists of two closely spaced low-mass red dwarfs. The secondary star is a dim magnitude 14 lost in the glare of the nearby primary star.

A study by George Gatewood in 2003 using older sources along with data from the Hipparcos satellite yielded an orbital period of about 16.6 years and a semi-major axis separation of about 1.1 arc seconds (2.4–5.3 AU). The most recent determination of the system orbital elements comes from a 2022 study combining data from radial velocity, astrometry, and imaging, which finds a similar orbital period, a semi-major axis of 4.2 AU, and a very low mass for the companion of 94.8 M_{J}.

== History ==
The primary star was discovered in 1927 by F. E. Ross using the 40 in (100 cm) refractor telescope at the Yerkes Observatory. He noticed the high proper motion of this dim 11th magnitude star in his second-epoch plates that were part of an astronomical survey started by E. E. Barnard, his predecessor at the observatory. Ross then included this new star in his eponymous catalog along with many others he discovered.

The first detection of a binary system was in 1936 by Dirk Reuyl using the 26-in refractor telescope of the McCormick Observatory at the University of Virginia using astrometric analysis of photographic plates. In 1951 Sarah L. Lippincott made the first reasonably accurate predictions of the position of the secondary star using the 24 in (61 cm) refractor telescope of the Sproul Observatory. These calculations were used by Walter Baade to find and optically resolve this binary system for the first time using the then new 5 m (200 in) Hale Telescope at the Palomar Observatory in California.
