= Innes' star =

Star in the constellation Carina

- Location of Innes' star in the constellation Carina

Observation data Epoch J2000 Equinox ICRS
- Constellation: Carina
- Right ascension: 11^{h} 16^{m} 00.20445^{s}
- Declination: −57° 32′ 51.5751″
- Apparent magnitude (V): 11.516

Characteristics
- Spectral type: M3.5V
- U−B color index: +0.92
- B−V color index: -0.22

Astrometry
Radial velocity (R_{v})	−50.70±0.30 km/s
Proper motion (μ)	RA: −2,468.407 mas/yr Dec.: +1,184.175 mas/yr
Parallax (π)	78.8922±0.0319 mas
Distance	41.34 ± 0.02 ly (12.676 ± 0.005 pc)
Absolute magnitude (M_{V})	11.00

Details
Mass	0.360±0.012 M_{☉}
Radius	0.371±0.012 R_{☉}
Luminosity	0.0173±0.0005 L_{☉}
Temperature	3,459±95 K
Metallicity [Fe/H]	−0.17±0.11 dex

Other designations
- Innes' star, GJ 422, HD 304043, HIP 55042, Ci 20 624, L 192-72, LFT 784, LHS 40, LPM 378, LTT 4167, PLX 2621, TYC 8624-3387-1

Database references
SIMBAD	data

Innes' star /ˈɪnɪs/, or Gliese 422, is an M3.5-type red dwarf star, located in the constellation Carina.

This star has 36% of the Sun's mass and 37% of the Sun's radius, yet only 1.7% of its luminosity, and an effective temperature of 3,459 K.

== Discovery ==
Innes' star was discovered in 1920 by Robert T. A. Innes in Union Observatory, Union of South Africa, who had discerned its large proper motion and a parallax of 0.337 arcsec. The discovery was published in Circular of the Union Observatory No. 49, hence its discovery name is UO 49, or In UOC 49. However, UO designations should be used with caution since they are often not unique for each star: the number in the name is the number of Circular, so all stars published in one Circular have identical names. So, all other newfound stars, published in the 49th Circular, may be named UO 49 too.

== Erroneous parallax ==
It is known for the fact that it had once been considered one of the nearest stars to Earth, due to erroneously measured parallax. The estimated distance was less than 10 light-years in the following studies:

- In List of stars nearer than 5 parsecs by Ejnar Hertzsprung (1922) its parallax is 0.339 arcsec (distance is 2.95 pc or 9.62 ly), and it is the 4th-closest star system after Alpha Centauri ABC, Barnard's Star and Sirius AB;
- In A study of the near-by stars by Willem Jacob Luyten and Harlow Shapley (1930) its parallax is 0.337 arcsec (distance is 2.97 pc or 9.68 ly), and it is the 4th-closest star system after Alpha Centauri ABC, Barnard's Star and Lalande 21185 (Sirius is further);
- In List of stars nearer than five parsecs by Peter van de Kamp (1930) its parallax is 0.34 arcsec (distance is 2.94 pc or 9.59 ly), and it is the 7th-closest star system after Alpha Centauri ABC, Barnard's Star, Wolf 359, Lalande 21185, Sirius AB and BD-12 4523;
- In Stars within ten parsecs of the Sun by Louise Freeland Jenkins (1937) its parallax is 0.34 arcsec (distance is 2.94 pc or 9.59 ly), and it is the 6th-closest star system after Alpha Centauri, Barnard's Star, Wolf 359, Lalande 21185 and Sirius.

Its actual distance is 12.676 parsecs (41.34 light-years), based on the parallax from Gaia DR3: 0.07889±0.00003 arcsec.

== Planetary system ==
In 2014, a sub-Neptune-mass planet, Gliese 422 b, of approximately ten Earth-masses, was discovered around this star. It orbits the star every 20 days and lies at a distance of around 0.11 astronomical units (AU)—11% of the distance between the Earth and Sun—on the inner edge of the stellar system's habitable zone, which for this star has been calculated to lie between 0.11 and 0.21 AU.

The discovery of GJ 422 b was confirmed in 2020.

The Innes' star planetary system
Companion (in order from star)	Mass	Semimajor axis (AU)	Orbital period (days)	Eccentricity	Inclination (°)	Radius
b	≥11.07±1.12 M_{🜨}	0.111±0.004	20.129±0.005	0.11±0.04	—	—

== Name ==
Innes' Star is one of a few stars named after people—named after a scientist, whereas the majority of proper names of stars have ancient origins or medieval, in the main Arabic, ones. Certain stars, found to be nearby due to their large proper motion, also fall into this class and are named after their discoverers: Barnard's Star, Kapteyn's Star, Luyten's Star, van Maanen's Star, van Biesbroeck's Star, and Teegarden's Star. Innes is also known as the discoverer of Proxima Centauri.
