= Red Dots Campaign =

The Red Dots Campaign is an effort by astronomers to search for exoplanets around nearby red dwarf stars. The project launched in 2017, following the Pale Red Dot campaign which discovered Proxima Centauri b. The Arecibo Observatory, the National Science Foundation and the Planetary Habitability Laboratory of the University of Puerto Rico are the main participating institutions. The initial targets were Proxima Centauri, Barnard's Star, and Ross 154; Barnard's Star, the second-closest star system to the Solar System, has long been the subject of intense interest.

Barnard's Star is among the most studied red dwarfs because of its proximity and favorable location for observation near the celestial equator. It has the highest proper motion of any known star relative to the Sun. The possibility of planets was first proposed by Peter van de Kamp, rejected after peer review, and then revived since the advent of new planet-hunting techniques. Doppler monitoring has been the most recent tactic deployed with the nearby star. The Red Dots campaign detected a candidate super-Earth around this star in 2018, but this was rejected by subsequent studies. Instead, a system of four small planets has since been confirmed.

Other results of the Red Dots campaign include the discovery of multi-planetary systems around GJ 1061 and Gliese 887, both including planets in the habitable zone. Red Dots observations were used to place limits on additional (undetected) planets around Gliese 832, Gliese 674, and Ross 128, each previously known to host a single planet.

== See also ==
- List of nearest stars
