= 1965 van de Kamp =

Stony main-belt asteroid

(1965) van de Kamp
Discovery
- Discovered by: C. J. van Houten; I. van Houten-G. T. Gehrels
- Discovery site: Palomar Obs.
- Discovery date: 24 September 1960

Designations
- Named after: Peter van de Kamp (Dutch astronomer)
- Alternative designations: 2521 P-L · 1927 QG; 1956 TN
- Minor planet category: main-belt · (middle)

Orbital characteristics
- Epoch 4 September 2017 (JD 2458000.5)
- Uncertainty parameter 0
- Observation arc: 89.57 yr (32,717 days)
- Aphelion: 2.8424 AU
- Perihelion: 2.2934 AU
- Semi-major axis: 2.5679 AU
- Eccentricity: 0.1069
- Orbital period (sidereal): 4.11 yr (1,503 days)
- Mean anomaly: 246.99°
- Mean motion: 0° 14^{m} 22.2^{s} / day
- Inclination: 2.2200°
- Longitude of ascending node: 88.196°
- Argument of perihelion: 343.42°

Physical characteristics
- Dimensions: 11.30 km (calculated); 11.72±0.55 km 13.606±0.289 km
- Synodic rotation period: 36 h
- Geometric albedo: 0.151±0.024; 0.20 (assumed); 0.225±0.022
- Spectral type: S
- Absolute magnitude (H): 11.90 · 12.00 · 12.1 · 12.28±0.33

(1965) van de Kamp, provisional designation 2521 P-L, is a stony asteroid from the central region of the asteroid belt, approximately 12 kilometers in diameter. It was discovered on 24 September 1960, by Dutch astronomer couple Ingrid and Cornelis van Houten at Leiden Observatory, on photographic plates taken by Dutch–American astronomer Tom Gehrels at the U.S Palomar Observatory, California. It was later named after Dutch astronomer Peter van de Kamp.

== Orbit and classification ==
The S-type asteroid orbits the Sun in the central main-belt at a distance of 2.3–2.8 AU once every 4 years and 1 month (1,503 days). Its orbit has an eccentricity of 0.11 and an inclination of 2° with respect to the ecliptic. The asteroid was first identified as 1927 QG at Heidelberg Observatory in 1927. Its first used observation was taken at Goethe Link Observatory in 1956, extending the body's observation arc by 4 years prior to its official discovery observation.

=== Palomar–Leiden survey ===
The survey designation "P-L" stands for Palomar–Leiden, named after Palomar Observatory and Leiden Observatory, which collaborated on the fruitful Palomar–Leiden survey in the 1960s. Gehrels used Palomar's Samuel Oschin telescope (also known as the 48-inch Schmidt Telescope), and shipped the photographic plates to Ingrid and Cornelis van Houten at Leiden Observatory where astrometry was carried out. The trio are credited with the discovery of several thousand minor planets.

== Physical characteristics ==
In February 2011, a fragmentary and inconclusive rotational lightcurve was obtained for this asteroid. It gave a longer than average rotation period of at least 36 hours with a brightness amplitude of 0.5 magnitude (U=1).

According to the surveys carried out by the Japanese Akari satellite and NASA's Wide-field Infrared Survey Explorer with its subsequent NEOWISE mission, the asteroid measures 11.8 and 13.6 kilometers in diameter and its surface has an albedo of 0.151 and 0.225, respectively. The Collaborative Asteroid Lightcurve Link assumes a standard albedo for stony asteroids of 0.20 and calculates a diameter of 11.3 kilometers with an absolute magnitude of 12.1.

== Naming ==
This minor planet was named after Dutch astronomer Peter van de Kamp (1901–1995), director of Sproul Observatory and known for his research on astrometric binaries. The approved naming citation was published by the Minor Planet Center on 1 December 1979 (M.P.C. 5038).
