= Red dot =

Red dot or Red Dot can refer to:

- A descriptive name for Bindi, a forehead decoration applied in the center of the forehead close to the eyebrows
- Red Dot Design Award, a German design competition
- A mark on a tire sidewall, indicating the point of maximum radial force and runout
- Little red dot, or red dot, a reference to the nation of Singapore
- Little Red Dots, a class of small, red-tinted astronomical objects of unknown nature
- Red Dot Payment, a payment service provider based in Singapore
- Red Dot United, a Singaporean political party
- Red dot sight, type of reflector gun sight
- On the Red Dot, a Channel NewsAsia current affairs programme about Singapore
- RedDot Solutions, the Web Solutions Group of Open Text business unit of Open Text Corporation
- "The Red Dot", 1991 Seinfeld TV episode
- The untitled eighth track on Pearl Jam's 1998 album Yield
- Red Dot (film), a 2021 film
- Red Dots Campaign, an exoplanet search project
