= Lalande 21185 =

Star in the constellation Ursa Major

- The red circle shows the approximate location of Lalande 21185 in Ursa Major

Observation data Epoch J2000 Equinox ICRS
- Constellation: Ursa Major
- Right ascension: 11^{h} 03^{m} 20.19482^{s}
- Declination: +35° 58′ 11.5762″
- Apparent magnitude (V): 7.520

Characteristics
- Spectral type: M2V
- Apparent magnitude (B): 8.960 ± 0.007
- Apparent magnitude (V): 7.520 ± 0.009
- Apparent magnitude (R): ~6.6
- Apparent magnitude (I): ~5.8
- Apparent magnitude (J): 4.203 ±0.242
- Apparent magnitude (H): 3.640 ±0.202
- Apparent magnitude (K): 3.254 ±0.306
- U−B color index: +1.074
- B−V color index: +1.444
- Variable type: BY

Astrometry
Radial velocity (R_{v})	−85.11±0.13 km/s
Proper motion (μ)	RA: −580.057 mas/yr Dec.: −4776.589 mas/yr
Parallax (π)	392.7529±0.0321 mas
Distance	8.3044 ± 0.0007 ly (2.5461 ± 0.0002 pc)
Absolute magnitude (M_{V})	10.48

Details
Mass	0.389±0.008 M_{☉}
Radius	0.392±0.004 R_{☉}
Luminosity (bolometric)	0.02194±0.00021 L_{☉}
Luminosity (visual, L_{V})	0.0055 (Note: From knowing the absolute visual magnitude of Lalande 21185, $\scriptstyle M_{V_{\ast}} = 10.48$, and the absolute visual magnitude of the Sun, $\scriptstyle M_{V_{\odot}}$ = $\scriptstyle 4.83$, the visual luminosity of Lalande 21185 can therefore be calculated: $\scriptstyle \frac{L_{V_{\ast}}}{L_{V_{\odot}}} = 10^{0.4\left(M_{V_{\odot}} - M_{V_{\ast}}\right )}$ = 0.005495 Lv_{⊙}) L_{☉}
Surface gravity (log g)	4.895+0.008 −0.010 cgs
Temperature	3,547±18 K
Metallicity [Fe/H]	−0.3621+0.0872 −0.0687 dex
Rotation	53.33±0.19 days
Age	8.047+3.958 −4.523 Gyr

Other designations
- NSV 18593, BD+36 2147, GJ 411, HD 95735, HIP 54035, SAO 62377, G 119-052, LFT 756, LHS 37, LTT 12960, NLTT 26105, PLX 2576, IRAS 11005+3615, 2MASS J11032023+3558117, J11032027+3558203, MCC 594

Database references
SIMBAD	data
Exoplanet Archive	data
ARICNS	data

Lalande 21185 (also known as BD+36 2147, Gliese 411, and HD 95735) is a star in the south of Ursa Major. It is the apparent brightest red dwarf in the northern hemisphere. (Note: Only AX Microscopii and Lacaille 9352, in the southern hemisphere, are brighter) Despite this, and being relatively close by, it is very dim (as are all red dwarfs), being only magnitude 7.5 in visible light and thus too faint to be seen with the unaided eye. The star is visible through a small telescope or binoculars.

At 8.304 light-years (2.546 parsecs) away it is one of the stars nearest to the Solar System; only the Alpha Centauri system, Barnard's Star, Wolf 359, and the brown dwarfs Luhman 16 and WISE 0855−0714 are known to be closer. Because of its proximity it is a frequent subject for astronomical surveys and other research and thus is known by numerous other designations, most commonly Gliese 411 and HD 95735. In approximately 19,900 years it will be at its closest, about 4.65 ly (1.43 pc) from the Sun, just over half its present distance.

Lalande 21185 has two known exoplanets and one candidate exoplanet, making it the third closest confirmed planetary system to the Solar System.

== History ==
Distances of the nearest stars from estimated 20,000 years ago until 80,000 years in the future

French astronomer Jérôme Lalande published the celestial coordinates of Lalande 21185 in the popular star catalog Histoire céleste française during year 1801. The catalog sequence numbers for majority of the observed stars, including Lalande 21185, were introduced in its 1847 edition by Francis Baily. Today this star is one of just a few that are still commonly referred to by their Lalande catalog number.

In May 1857, Friedrich Wilhelm Argelander discovered the high proper motion of the star. It was sometimes called "Argelander's second star". (The "first Argelander's star" is Groombridge 1830, whose high proper motion was discovered by Argelander earlier—in 1842). A large proper motion was recognised as an indicator for stars which lay close to the Sun, leading Argelander to request that its parallax be measured.

As per this request, Friedrich August Theodor Winnecke made the first measurement of the star's parallax of 0.511 arc seconds between 1857–58 and thus first identifying Lalande 21185 as the second-closest-known star to the Sun, after the Alpha Centauri system. Since that time better measurements have placed the star farther away, but it remained the second-closest-known star system until the astrophotographic discovery of two dim red dwarfs, Wolf 359 and Barnard's Star, in the early 20th century.

== Properties ==
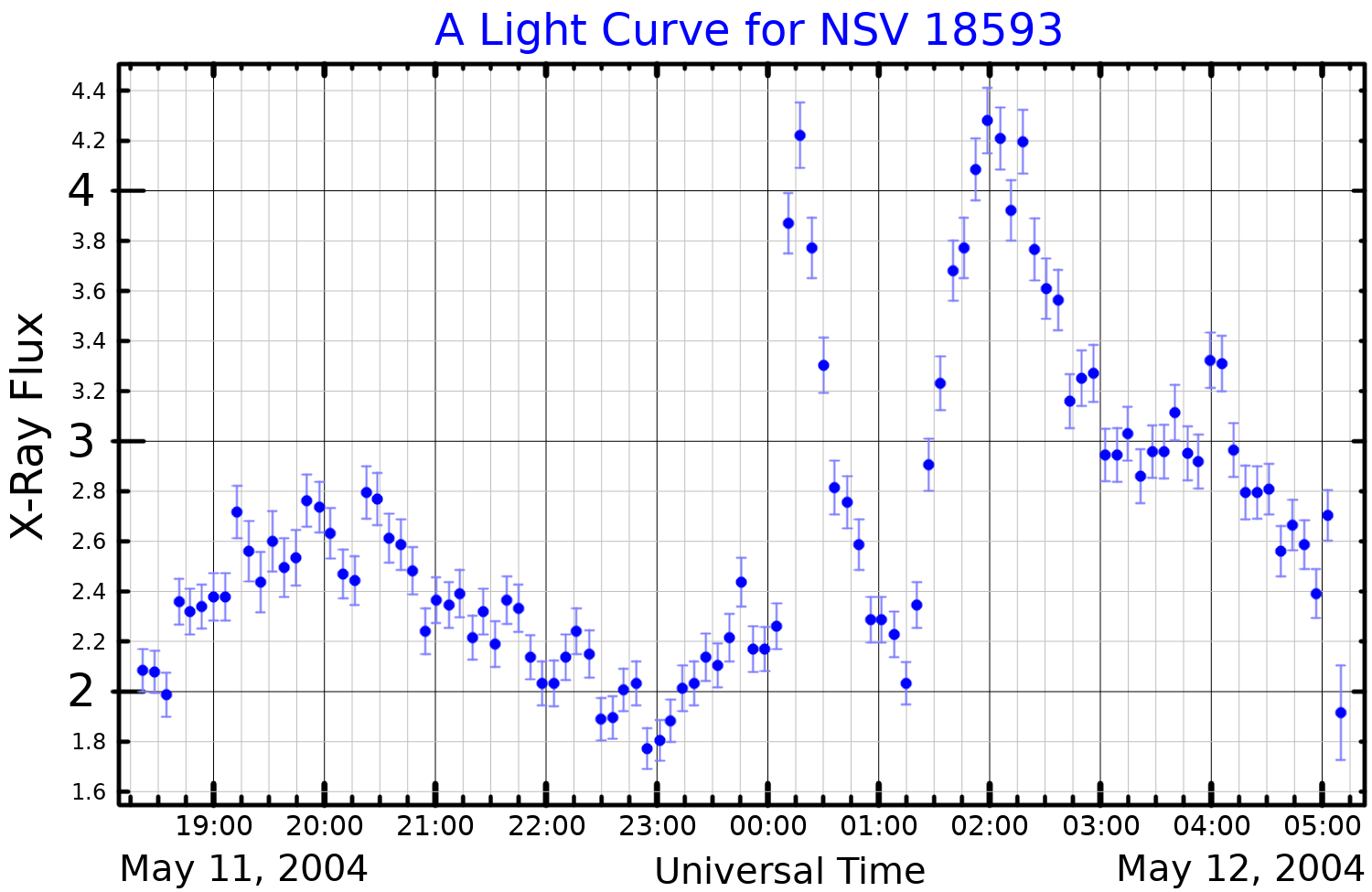
An X-ray light curve for a flare on NSV 18593, adapted from Pye et al. (2015)

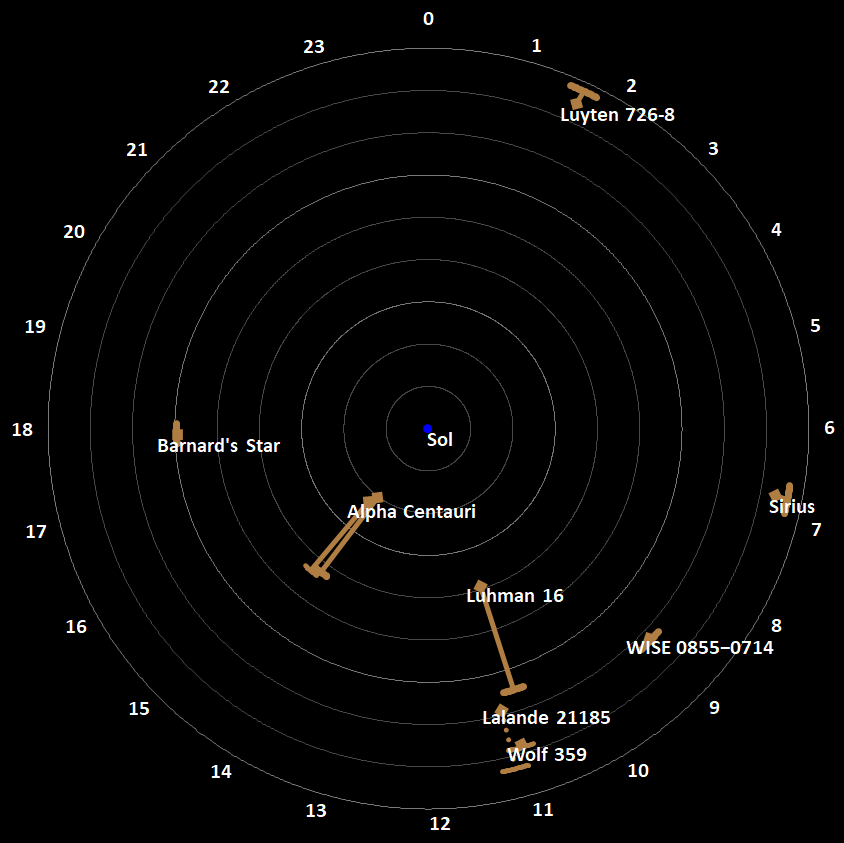
The position of Lalande 21185 on a radar map among all stellar objects or stellar systems within 9 light years (ly) from the map's center, the Sun (Sol). The diamond-shapes are their positions entered according to right ascension in hours angle (indicated at the edge of the map's reference disc), and according to their declination. The second mark shows each's distance from Sol, with the concentric circles indicating the distance in steps of one ly.

Lalande 21185 is a typical type-M main-sequence star (red dwarf) with about 39% of the mass and radius of the Sun. It is also much cooler than the Sun with a surface temperature of 3,550 K. With just 2.2% of the Sun's luminosity, it is intrinsically dim with an absolute magnitude of 10.48, emitting most of its energy in the infrared. The proportion of elements other than hydrogen and helium is estimated based on the ratio of iron to hydrogen in the star when compared to the Sun. The logarithm of this ratio is −0.20, indicating that the proportion of iron is about 10^{−0.20}, or 63% of the Sun. The surface gravity of this relatively compact star is approximately 65 times greater than the gravity at Earth's surface (log g = 4.8 cgs), which is more than twice the surface gravity of the Sun.

Lalande 21185 is listed as a BY Draconis type variable star in the General Catalogue of Variable Stars. It is identified by the variable star designation NSV 18593. Several star catalogs, including SIMBAD, also classify it as a flare star. This conclusion is not supported by the primary reference these catalogs all use. The observations made in this reference show that it is rather quiet in comparison to other stars of its variable type.

Lalande 21185 emits X-rays, and X-ray flares have been observed.

== Planetary system ==
Data published in 2017 from the HIRES system at the Keck Observatory on Mauna Kea supported the existence of a close-in planet with an orbital period of just 9.8693±0.0016 days, being at least 3.8 M_{🜨}. Further radial velocity research with the SOPHIE échelle spectrograph and review of the original signal found that the 9.9 day period was undetectable, and instead proposed, using both datasets, an exoplanet orbiting the star with a period of either 12.95 or 1.08 days, much more likely 12.95, insofar as 1-day-period exoplanets seem to be rare in systems. This would give the planet a minimum mass of 2.99 Earth masses. It is too close to the star, and so therefore too hot, to be in the habitable zone, at all points within its eccentric orbit. The proposed planet on 12-day orbit was confirmed by CARMENES (Calar Alto high-Resolution search for M dwarfs with Exoearths with Near-infrared and optical Echelle Spectrographs) project in 2020.

A second planet with a more distant orbit was initially noticed by SOPHIE, but the baseline was not long enough to confirm the several-year-long signal. The signal was confirmed in 2021 to be a planet with mass at least 18.0+2.9
−2.6 M_{🜨}, a lower-bound estimate later revised to 14.2±1.8 M_{🜨}.

A third planet, Gliese 411 d, is suspected to orbit between Gliese 411 b and Gliese 411 c with a period of 215 days.

The Lalande 21185 planetary system
Companion (in order from star)	Mass	Semimajor axis (AU)	Orbital period (days)	Eccentricity	Inclination (°)	Radius
b	≥2.69+0.19 −0.18 M_{🜨}	0.07879+0.00056 −0.00055	12.9394+0.0014 −0.0013	0.063+0.061 −0.043	—	—
d (unconfirmed)	≥3.89+0.82 −0.85 M_{🜨}	0.5142+0.0043 −0.0041	215.7±1.2	0.18+0.22 −0.13	—	—
c	≥13.6+2.4 −2.3 M_{🜨}	2.94+0.14 −0.12	2946+210 −180	0.132+0.16 −0.091	—	—

The habitable zone for this star, defined as the locations where liquid water could be present on an Earth-like planet, is at a radius of 0.11–0.24 AU, where 1 AU is the average distance from the Earth to the Sun. The planet b has an equilibrium temperature of 370.1^{+5.8}_{−6.8} K. Other known planets are outside HZ boundaries too, but undetected low-mass ones may be orbiting in this region of this system as well.

=== Past claims of planets ===
Dutch astronomer Peter van de Kamp wrote in 1945 that Lalande 21185 possessed an "unseen companion" of 0.06 M_{☉} (about 60 M_{J}). In 1951 van de Kamp and his student Sarah Lippincott claimed the astrometric detection of a planetary system using photographic plates taken with the 24-inch (610 mm) refractor telescope at Swarthmore College's Sproul Observatory. In the summer of 1960, Sarah Lippincott altered the 1951 claim, to a planet of 0.01 M_{☉} (that is, 10 M_{J}), an 8-year orbital period, eccentricity of 0.3, a semi-major axis (Note: which would be orbital radius if e was 0, that is, a circular orbit) of 0.083 AU. She used the original photographic plates and new plates taken with the same telescope. Photographic plates from this observatory, taken at the same time, were used by Van de Kamp for his erroneous claim of a planetary system for Barnard's Star. The plates made with the Sproul 24-inch refractor and used for these and other studies were in 1973 shown to be flawed; as they were the next year with astrometric measurements made by George Gatewood of the Allegheny Observatory.

In 1996 the same Gatewood prominently announced at an AAS meeting and to the popular press the discovery of multiple planets in this system, detected by astrometry. The initial report was based on a very delicate analysis of the star's position over the years, which suggested reflex orbital motion due to one or more companions. Gatewood claimed that such companions would usually appear more than 0.8 arcseconds from the red dwarf itself. Though, a paper by Gatewood published only a few years earlier and later searches by others, using coronagraphs and multifilter techniques to reduce the scattered-light problems from the star, did not positively identify any such companions, and so his claim remains unconfirmed and is now in doubt.

Before the 1980s, finding the radial velocity of red dwarfs was neither very accurate nor consistent, and so due to its apparent brightness and because it does not have a companion, this star, along with eleven other similar red dwarf stars, were chosen to have their radial velocity measured, to unprecedented high accuracy, by planet hunter Geoff Marcy. No companion was detected around this star in this nor other contemporary surveys, and such early equipment would have picked up any planet exceeding 0.7 M_{J} in an extremely close orbit of 5 days or less; or exceeding 10 M_{J} at about Jupiter's orbital distance.

== In popular culture ==
Lalande 21185 is featured as the location for "Object #6 Lalande 21185" in Spacecraft 2000-2100 AD (1978) by British writer and artist Stewart Cowley.

== See also ==
- 70 Ophiuchi
- Barnard's Star
- List of nearest stars and brown dwarfs
- Wolf 359
