= George David Gatewood =

American astronomer

George David Gatewood (born 1940) also known as George G. Gatewood, is an American astronomer and presently professor emeritus at the University of Pittsburgh and at the Allegheny Observatory. He specializes in astronomy, astronomical instrumentation, statistical methods, stellar astrophysics, astrometric properties of nearby stars and the observational discovery and the study of planetary systems. He came to popular attention with his 1996 announcement of the discovery of a nearby multi-planet star system. This discovery has yet to be confirmed and is regarded with skepticism today.

== Education ==
Gatewood received his B.A. in Astronomy from the University of South Florida in 1965. He received his M.A. in Astronomy from the University of South Florida in 1968. He received his Ph.D. in 1972 from the University of Pittsburgh. His doctoral dissertation was an astrometric study of Barnard's Star.

== The Barnard's Star affair ==
In the 1960s astronomer Peter van de Kamp claimed that he had discovered a planet orbiting Barnard's Star using astrometry. Two papers from 1973 were most influential in discrediting this claim. The first, by John L. Hershey, identified systematic errors in the telescope that van de Kamp had used. The second paper was authored by Gatewood and Heinrich Eichhorn, who repeated the astrometry measurements made by van de Kamp with improved equipment and failed to detect any sign of Barnard's Star companions.

== The Lalande 21185 affair ==
Despite his involvement in the Barnard's Star affair 23 years earlier, Gatewood himself created a similar controversy. Gatewood predicted the existence of planets around nearby stars and studied these stars intensely attempting to detect planets by astrometry. Gatewood began studying Lalande 21185 soon after completing his thesis in the early 1970s. He failed to detect any planets at that time but was not discouraged. He continued to study this star and in 1996 he announced at an AAS meeting and to the popular press that a multiple-planet planetary system was present around this star, even though data from careful measurements he made himself a few years earlier indicated that large planets in this system were unlikely. Numerous subsequent studies of this system have failed to confirm the presence of any planets and have also gradually discredited his claim.

One popular science fiction novel written in the mid-1980s refers to Lalande 21185 as "Gatewood's Star". Likely Gatewood's name was chosen in response to the popular books and articles he wrote predicting the existence of possibly inhabited planets around this and other nearby stars at that time, as this novel preceded his announcement of planets in this system by a decade.

== Later research ==
Gatewood continued to be active in astronomy up through 2009. In 2009 he published his last papers; one is a refinement of the distances to several dim nearby stars, including the best current value for the distance to Teegarden's star of 12.578 light years.

== Selected publications ==
Gatewood is a prolific researcher and writer with 157 publications since 1967. He has also authored several popular books on astronomy. The following is a list of recent publications listed on his Curriculum Vitae as well as the university website.

- 2001 “A Combined Hipparcos and MAP Study of the Proposed Planetary System of Rho Coronae Borealis”, Ap J 548, L61. Gatewood, G., Han, I. & Black, D.C.
- 2001 “Hipparcos and MAP Studies of the Triple Star Pi Cephei”, ApJ 549, 1145 Gatewood, G., Han, I., Kiewiet de Jonge, J., Reiland, C.T., & Pourbaix, D.
- 2002 “A Precise Orbit Determination of chi 1 Orionis from Astrometric and Radial Velocity Data”, PASP 114, 224. Han, I. and Gatewood, G.
- 2002, “An Upper Limit to the Mass of the Radial Velocity Companion of rho1 Cancri”, ApJ 564, L27-L30. M.A. McGarth, E. Nelson, D.C. Black, G. Gatewood, K. Noll, A. Schultz, S. Lubow, I. Han, T.F. Stepinski, T. Targett.
- 2003, Update to “An Upper Limit to the Mass of the Radial Velocity Companion of rho1 Cancri”, Scientific Frontiers in Research on Extrasolar Planets, ASP Conference Series (ed D.Deming and S.Seager). M.A. McGarth, E. Nelan, K. Noll, A. Schultz, S. Lubow, D.C. Black, T.F.Stepinski, G. Gatewood, I Han, and T. Targett.
- 2003 “An Astrometric Study of the Low-Mass Binary Star Ross 614", AJ 125, 1530, George Gatewood, Han, I., and Louis Coban.
- 2004 "The Allegheny Observatory CCD Parallax Program," G. Gatewood, Bulletin of the American Astronomical Society, The Annual Meeting of the AAS Division on Dynamical Astronomy, Cannes, France, BAAS, 36, 854.
- 2005 "An Astrometric Study of the Binary Star α Oph," G. Gatewood, AJ 130, 809.
- 2006 "Preliminary Parallaxes from the Allegheny and Carnegie Observatories," G. Gatewood, A. Boss, A.J. Weinberger, I. Thompson, S. Majewski, R. Patterson, L. Coban, BAAS, 37, 1269.
- 2006 "An Astrometric Study of Procyon," G. Gatewood and Inwoo Han, AJ 131, 1015.
- 2009 "Allegheny Observatory Parallaxes for Late M Dwarfs and White Dwarfs," G. Gatewood, L. Coban, AJ 137, 402.
