= Laurence Lafore =

American historian and novelist (1917-1985)

Laurence Davis Lafore
- Born: September 15, 1917; Narberth, Pennsylvania, U.S.
- Died: November 24, 1985 (aged 68); Iowa City, Iowa, U.S.
- Resting place: West Laurel Hill Cemetery, Bala Cynwyd, Pennsylvania, U.S.
- Education: Swarthmore College (BA), Tufts University Fletcher School of Law and Diplomacy (MA, PhD)
- Occupations: Professor of history, novelist

Laurence Davis Lafore (September 15, 1917 – November 24, 1985) was an American historian and novelist. He was a professor of history at Swarthmore College from 1946 to 1969 and at the University of Iowa from 1969 to 1985. He specialized in European history and foreign policy and published several spy fiction novels.

== Early life and education ==
Lafore was born September 15, 1917, in Narberth, Pennsylvania. One of Lafore's brothers, John A. Lafore, Jr., was a United States congressman from Pennsylvania and a president of the American Kennel Club.

Lafore graduated with a BA degree from Swarthmore College in 1938 and a MA degree from Tufts University Fletcher School of Law and Diplomacy in 1939. He served in the United States Department of State during World War II as an assistant information officer in London and Paris. He earned a PhD degree from the Fletcher School of Law and Diplomacy in 1950.

== Career ==
Lafore was a faculty member at Swarthmore College from 1946 to 1969. He joined the history faculty at the University of Iowa in 1969 and taught there until 1985. He specialized in European history and foreign policy.

His books included Learner's Permit (1962), a satirical comedy about English scholars and their pretensions; The Long Fuse (1965), about the origins of World War I; and The End Of Glory (1970), about the origins of World War II. He co-published Philadelphia: The Unexpected City, with Sarah Lee Lippincott in 1965. He published The Days of Emperor and Clown in 1973 about the Second Italo-Ethiopian War. He published several spy fiction novels and nonfiction articles for magazines including Harper's and The Atlantic.

He received the Athenaeum Literary Award from the Athenaeum of Philadelphia in 1965 for his book The Long Fuse.

He died November 24, 1985, at his home in Iowa City, Iowa, and was interred at West Laurel Hill Cemetery in Bala Cynwyd, Pennsylvania.

== Publications ==
- Learner's Permit: A Novel, Doubleday, 1962
- Nine Seven Juliet: A Mystery Novel, Doubleday, 1969
- The End of Glory - An Interpretation of the Origins of World War II, Long Grove, Illinois: Waveland Press, Inc., 1970, ISBN 978-1-57766-234-1
- The Long Fuse - An Interpretation of the Origins of World War I, Long Grove, Illinois: Waveland Press, Inc., 1971, ISBN 978-0-88133-954-3
