= Gliese 422 b =

Mini Neptune orbiting Gliese 422

Discovery
- Discovered by: M. Tuomi et al.
- Discovery date: 3 March 2014
- Detection method: Radial velocity

Orbital characteristics
- Semi-major axis: 0.111 AU (16,600,000 km)
- Eccentricity: 0.11±0.04
- Orbital period (sidereal): 20.129±0.005 d
- Semi-amplitude: 4.49
- Star: Gliese 422 (Innes' star)

Gliese 422 b is an exoplanet orbiting the red dwarf Gliese 422 (Innes' star). Gliese 422 b was discovered in 2014, and the discovery was confirmed in 2020. It has a minimum mass of about ten times that of Earth.

It is located on the inner edge of circumstellar habitable zone (HZ) of Gliese 422, which extends from 0.11 to 0.21 AU. Gliese 422 b's semi-major axis is 0.119 AU and its orbital period is 26.161 Earth days.
