= Ross (lunar crater) =

Crater on the Moon

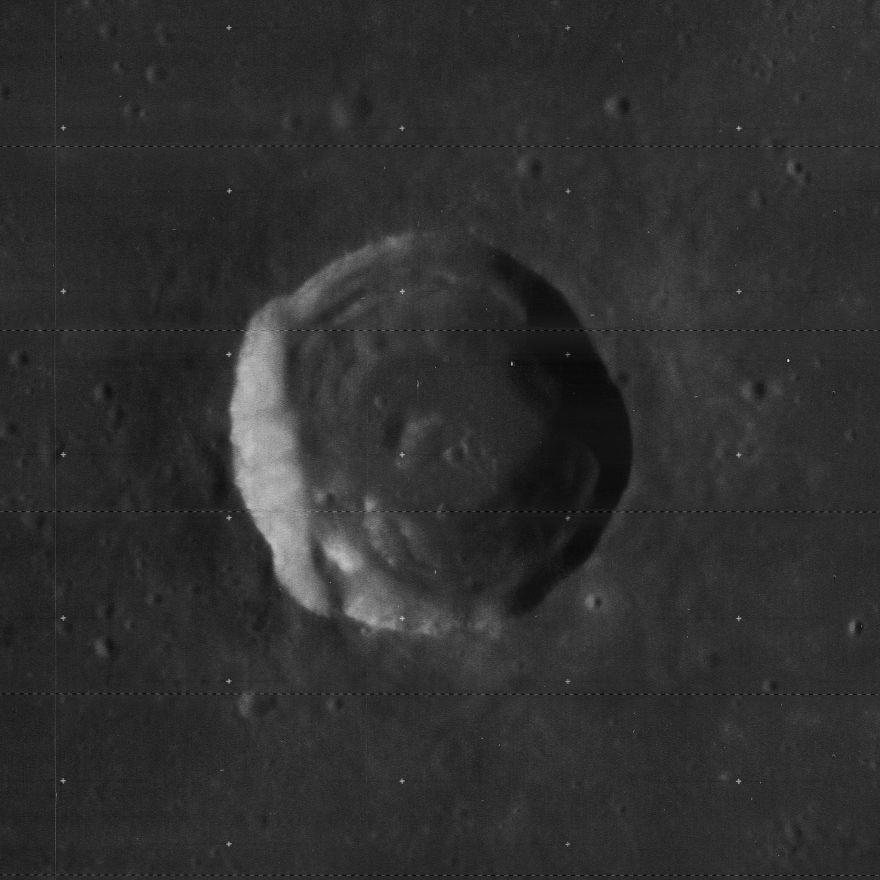
- Lunar Orbiter 4 image
- Coordinates: 11.67°N 21.74°E
- Diameter: 24.49 km (15.22 mi)
- Depth: 2.36 km (1.47 mi)
- Colongitude: 338° at sunrise
- Eponym: James C. Ross and Frank Elmore Ross

Ross is a lunar impact crater that is located in the northwest part of the Mare Tranquillitatis. It lies south-southwest of the crater Plinius, and northeast of the lava-flooded Maclear. The crater has a diameter of 24.5 km and a depth of 2.36 km.

This impact dates to the Eratosthenian period of the lunar geologic timescale. The crater has a generally circular shape, but is not quite symmetrical. The inner walls slope down to a base of slumped material, before joining a relatively level interior floor. There is a low ridge to the west of the crater midpoint.

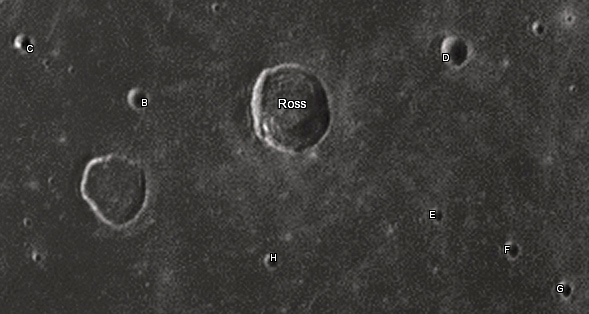
Ross crater and its satellite craters taken from Earth in 2012 at the University of Hertfordshire's Bayfordbury Observatory with the telescopes Meade LX200 14" and Lumenera Skynyx 2-1

This crater was named by the IAU in 1935, after British explorer James Clark Ross (1800-1862) and American astronomer and optician Frank E. Ross (1874-1966). Its designation was formally adopted by the International Astronomical Union in 1935.

== Satellite craters ==
By convention these features are identified on lunar maps by placing the letter on the side of the crater midpoint that is closest to Ross.

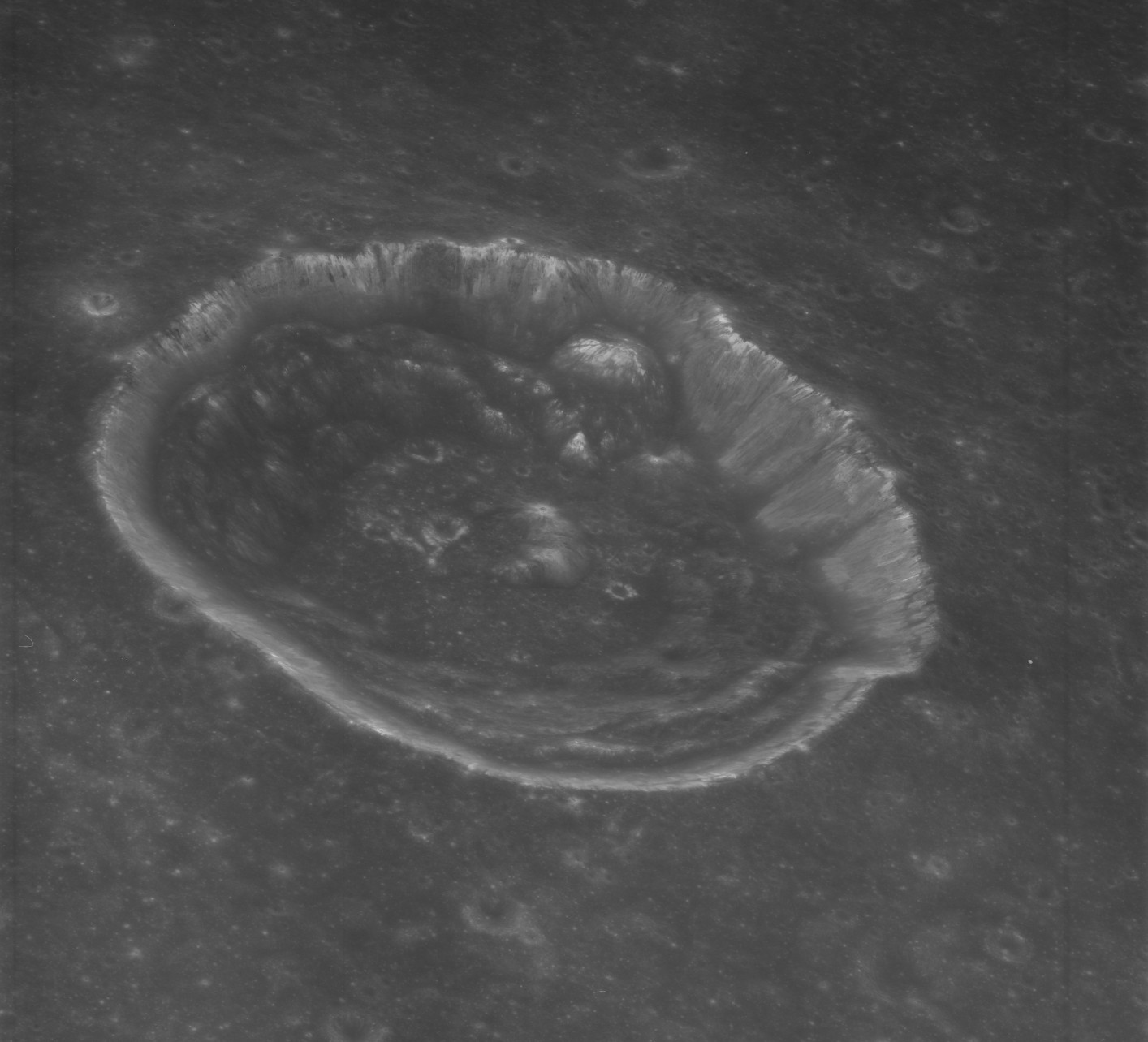
Oblique view facing south from Apollo 15

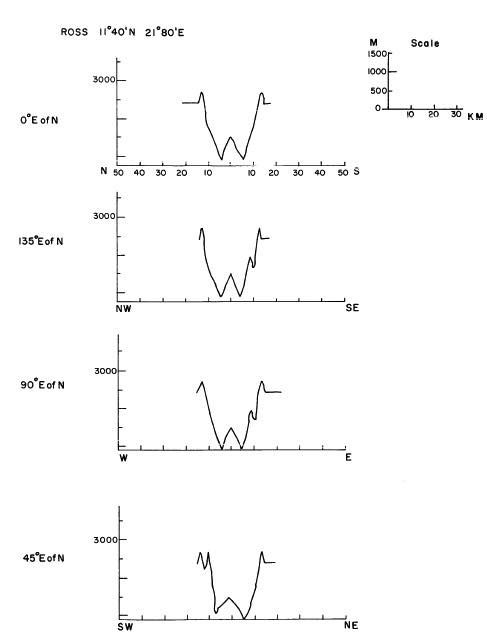
Cross sections of Ross crater with different elevations of each direction.

Ross	Latitude	Longitude	Diameter
B	11.4° N	20.2° E	6 km
C	11.7° N	19.0° E	5 km
D	12.6° N	23.3° E	9 km
E	11.1° N	23.4° E	4 km
F	10.9° N	24.2° E	5 km
G	10.7° N	24.9° E	5 km
H	10.2° N	21.8° E	5 km
