= Histoire céleste française =

Astrometric star catalogue by Joseph Lalande (1801)

Histoire Céleste Française
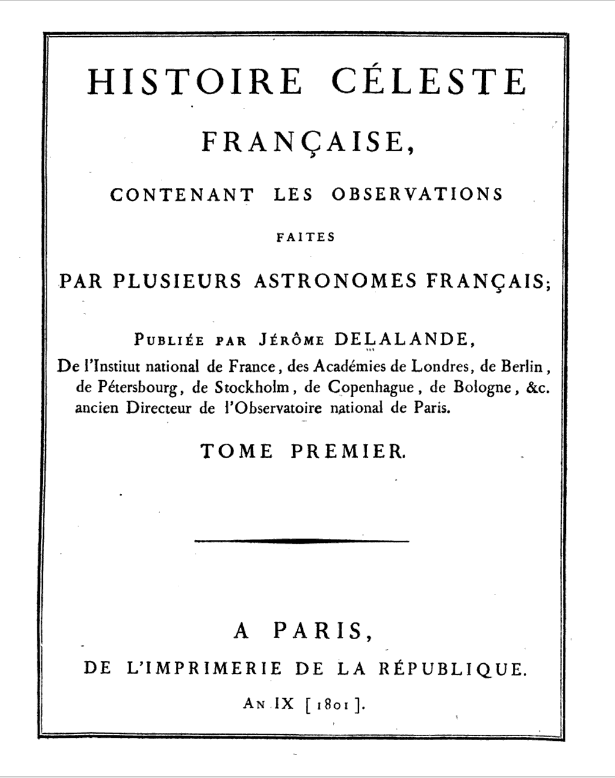
- Related media on Commons

Histoire céleste française (French Celestial History) is an astrometric star catalogue published in 1801 by the French astronomer Jérôme Lalande and his staff at the Paris Observatory. This star catalog consists of the locations and apparent magnitudes of 47,390 stars, up to magnitude 9. Stars are identified by common name, Bayer designation or Flamsteed designation, when available. It also contains observations of other astronomical phenomena. It was the largest and most complete star catalog of its day. This publication is a collection of several books of astronomical recordings taken over the previous decade at the observatory.

A significant rewriting of this star catalog was published by Francis Baily in 1847. It is from this catalog that the star reference numbers were assigned that continue in use to this day, such as for Lalande 21185.

Modern star catalogs, such as SIMBAD, use the format LAL NNNNN where NNNNN is the 1847 catalog reference number, from 1 to 47390.
