= Maclear (crater) =

Crater on the Moon

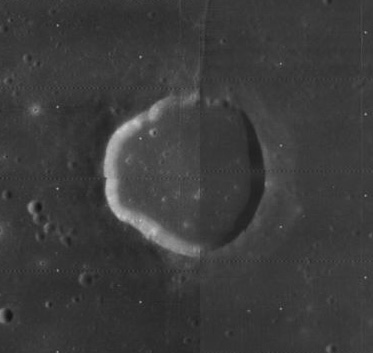
- mosaic of Lunar Orbiter 4 images
- Coordinates: 10.5°N 20.1°E
- Diameter: 20 km
- Depth: 0.74 km (0.46 mi)
- Colongitude: 340° at sunrise
- Eponym: Thomas Maclear

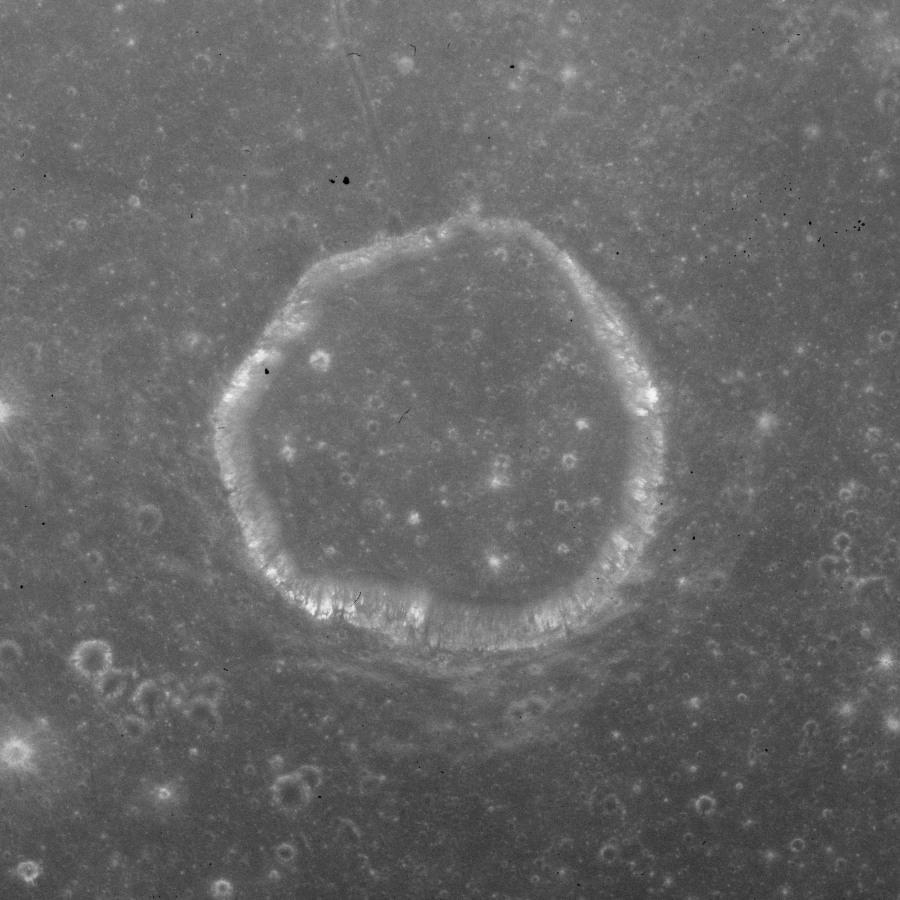
Apollo 15 image

Maclear is a lava-flooded crater on the northwest part of the Mare Tranquillitatis, a lunar mare in the eastern half of the Moon. Its diameter is 20 km. The crater is located to the southwest of the slightly larger Ross. To the southwest of Maclear is Sosigenes, while farther to the south-southeast is Arago.

This impact is dated to the Imbrian period of lunar geological history. With most of its interior submerged in deposits of basaltic lava, all that remains of this crater is a narrow rim projecting above the surrounding mare. The rim is not quite circular, having a flat outward bulge along the western side. But the rim is relatively uniform in width and is not significantly eroded.

The crater rim lies at the southern terminus of a rille belonging to a system that runs along the western edges of Mare Tranquillitatis. The rille system to the north of the crater is designated Rimae Maclear, while the rilles to the south-southwest are named Rimae Sosigenes. The Rimae Maclear stretches for about 100 kilometers, reaching Al-Bakri to the north along the edge of the mare.

It is named after Sir Thomas Maclear, Her Majesty's astronomer at the Royal Observatory, Cape of Good Hope (Cape Town, South Africa), from 1833 to 1870.

== Satellite craters ==
By convention these features are identified on lunar maps by placing the letter on the side of the crater midpoint that is closest to Maclear.

| Maclear | Latitude | Longitude | Diameter |
|---|---|---|---|
| A | 11.3° N | 18.0° E | 5 km |
