= Frank Elmore Ross =

American astronomer and physicist

- Born: April 2, 1874; San Francisco, California, US
- Died: September 21, 1960 (aged 86); Altadena, California, US
- Education: University of California
- Scientific career
- Fields: Astronomy
- Workplaces: Yerkes Observatory; International Latitude Observatory

Frank Elmore Ross (April 2, 1874 – September 21, 1960) was an American astronomer and physicist.

== Early life ==
He was born in San Francisco, California and died in Altadena, California. In 1901 he received his doctorate from the University of California. In 1905 he became director of the International Latitude Observatory station at Gaithersburg, Maryland. In 1915 he became a physicist for Eastman Kodak Company at Rochester, New York. He accepted a position at Yerkes Observatory in 1924 and worked there until his retirement in 1939.

His first important work was the calculation of the first reliable orbit of Saturn's moon Phoebe in 1905, and he also calculated orbits for Jupiter's satellites Himalia and Elara. When working for Eastman Kodak he investigated photographic emulsions and the design of wide-angle lenses for astronomical use.

At Yerkes Observatory he was the successor to the late E. E. Barnard, inheriting Barnard's collection of photographic plates. Ross decided to repeat the same series of images and compare the results with a blink comparator. In doing so, he discovered 379 new variable stars and over 1000 stars of high proper motion. Some of the high–proper motion stars turned out to be quite nearby, and many of these stars (such as Ross 154) are still widely known by the catalog number he gave them.

During the opposition of Mars in 1926 he photographed the planet in different colors, using the Mount Wilson 60-inch telescope. The following year he obtained ultraviolet pictures of Venus, which showed structure in its cloud cover for the first time.

In 1935, he published an article describing the design of a two-lens system to correct for the coma aberration of parabolic mirrors, including those at the 60-inch and 100-inch telescopes at Mount Wilson Observatory. Such a corrector is since known as the Ross corrector.

The crater Ross on Mars is named after him, and the crater Ross on the Moon is jointly named after him and James Clark Ross. He was awarded the Franklin Institute's John Price Wetherill Medal in 1928.
