= Peter van de Kamp =

Dutch astronomer (1901–1995)

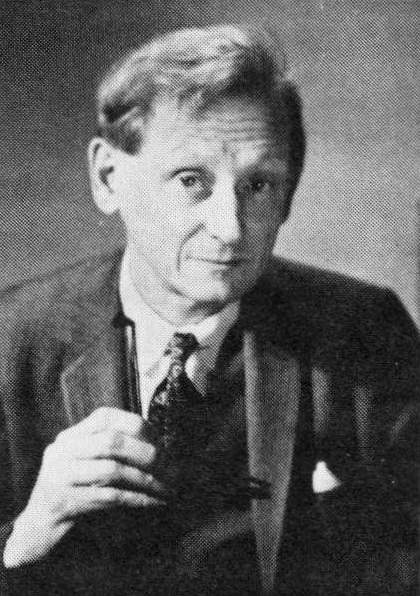
- Van de Kamp circa 1973
- Born: December 26, 1901; Kampen, Netherlands
- Died: May 18, 1995 (aged 93); Amsterdam, Netherlands
- Education: University of Utrecht, University of California, Berkeley
- Known for: Astrometry
- Awards: Janssen Prize
- Scientific career
- Fields: Astronomy
- Workplaces: Sproul Observatory, University of Amsterdam

Piet van de Kamp (December 26, 1901 – May 18, 1995) was a Dutch astronomer. Known as Peter van de Kamp in the United States, he lived most of his life in that country. He was professor of astronomy at Swarthmore College and director of the college's Sproul Observatory from 1937 until 1972. He specialized in astrometry, studying parallax and proper motions of stars.

His work consisted of assisting with parallax programs and proper motion work on stars. Van de Kamp worked under Samuel Alfred Mitchell and Harold Alden. He and Alexander N. Vyssotsky spent eight years measuring 18,000 proper motions. He did additional, smaller projects individually, including an investigation for general and selective absorption of light within the Milky Way.

Van de Kamp came to public attention in the 1960s when he announced that Barnard's Star had a planetary system based on observed "wobbles" in its motion. The particular finding is now known to be false, but scientific debate remains regarding companions around the red dwarf star. He first propounded the theory to the International Astronomical Union in 1963.

== Early life and education ==
Van de Kamp was the son of Lubbertus van de Kamp and Engelina C. A. van der Wal. His younger brother Jacob van de Kamp was also a successful scientist: an organic chemist, who spent most of his career in the United States.

Van de Kamp studied at the University of Utrecht and started his professional career at the Kapteyn Astronomical Institute in Groningen working with Pieter Johannes van Rhijn. In 1923 he left for the Leander McCormick Observatory at the University of Virginia for a year's residence supported by the Draper Fund of the National Academy of Sciences. There he assisted Samuel Alfred Mitchell with his stellar parallax program and Harold Alden with the Boss star project, both concerned with the proper motion and apparent position of stars relative to our solar system. He also worked alongside Alexander Vyssotsky and together they spent eight years measuring 18,000 proper motions. Van de Kemp's other work included an investigation for general and selective absorption of light within the galaxy.

Concurrent to his work in Virginia, Van de Kamp went to the Lick Observatory in California as a Kellogg fellow. There he received his PhD from the University of California in Astronomy in June 1925. The next year he also received a PhD from the University of Groningen.

Van de Kamp returned to McCormick on October 1, 1925, to take up the position left vacant by Harold Alden, who had just taken up the directorship of the Yale University Observatory Southern Station in Johannesburg, South Africa. In 1928, he received a promotion from instructor to assistant professor at the University of Virginia. In the spring of 1937, Van de Kamp left McCormick Observatory to take over as director of Swarthmore College's Sproul Observatory. One of his early pupils in astrometry was Nancy Grace Roman, who went on to become NASA's first Chief of Astronomy.

== Barnard's Star affair ==
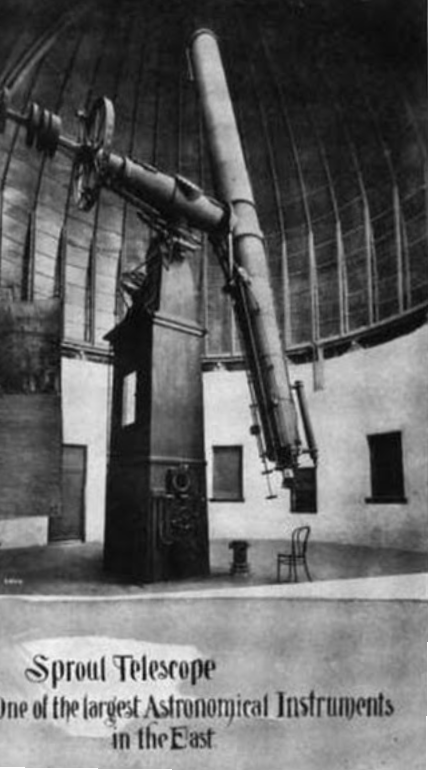
Van de Kamp made the bulk of his observations through the Sproul Telescope.

While at Sproul Observatory, he made astrometric measurements of Barnard's Star and in the 1960s reported a periodic "wobble" in its motion, apparently due to planetary companions. It was not until several decades had passed that a consensus had formed that this had been a spurious detection. In 1973 astronomers George Gatewood of the Allegheny Observatory and Heinrich Eichhorn of the University of Florida, using data obtained with improved equipment on the 30-inch Thaw Refractor telescope, did not detect any planets but instead detected a change in the color-dependent image scale of the images obtained from the 24-inch refractor telescope at the Sproul Observatory used by Van de Kamp in his study.

Astronomer John L. Hershey found that this anomaly apparently occurred after each time the objective lens was removed, cleaned, and replaced. Hundreds more stars showed "wobbles" like Barnard's Star's when photographs before and after cleaning were compared – a virtual impossibility. Wulff Heintz, Van de Kamp's successor at Swarthmore and an expert on double stars, questioned his findings and began publishing criticisms from 1976 onwards; the two are reported to have become estranged because of this.

Van de Kamp never admitted that his claim was in error and continued to publish papers about a planetary system around Barnard's Star into the 1980s, while modern radial velocity curves place a limit on the planets much smaller than claimed by Van de Kamp. A study in 2018 suggested that there was a planet orbiting Barnard's Star (Barnard's Star b), albeit of much lower mass than Van de Kamp could have detected. In August 2024, using data from ESPRESSO spectrograph of the Very Large Telescope, the existence of an exoplanet with a minimum mass of 0.37±0.05 M_{🜨} and orbital period of 3.15 days was confirmed. This constituted the first convincing evidence for a planet orbiting Barnard's Star.

Additionally, three other candidate low-mass planets were proposed in this study. All of these planets orbit closer to the star than the habitable zone. However, the indicated masses of the planets are again far below those capable of detection by Van de Kamp.

== Other work ==
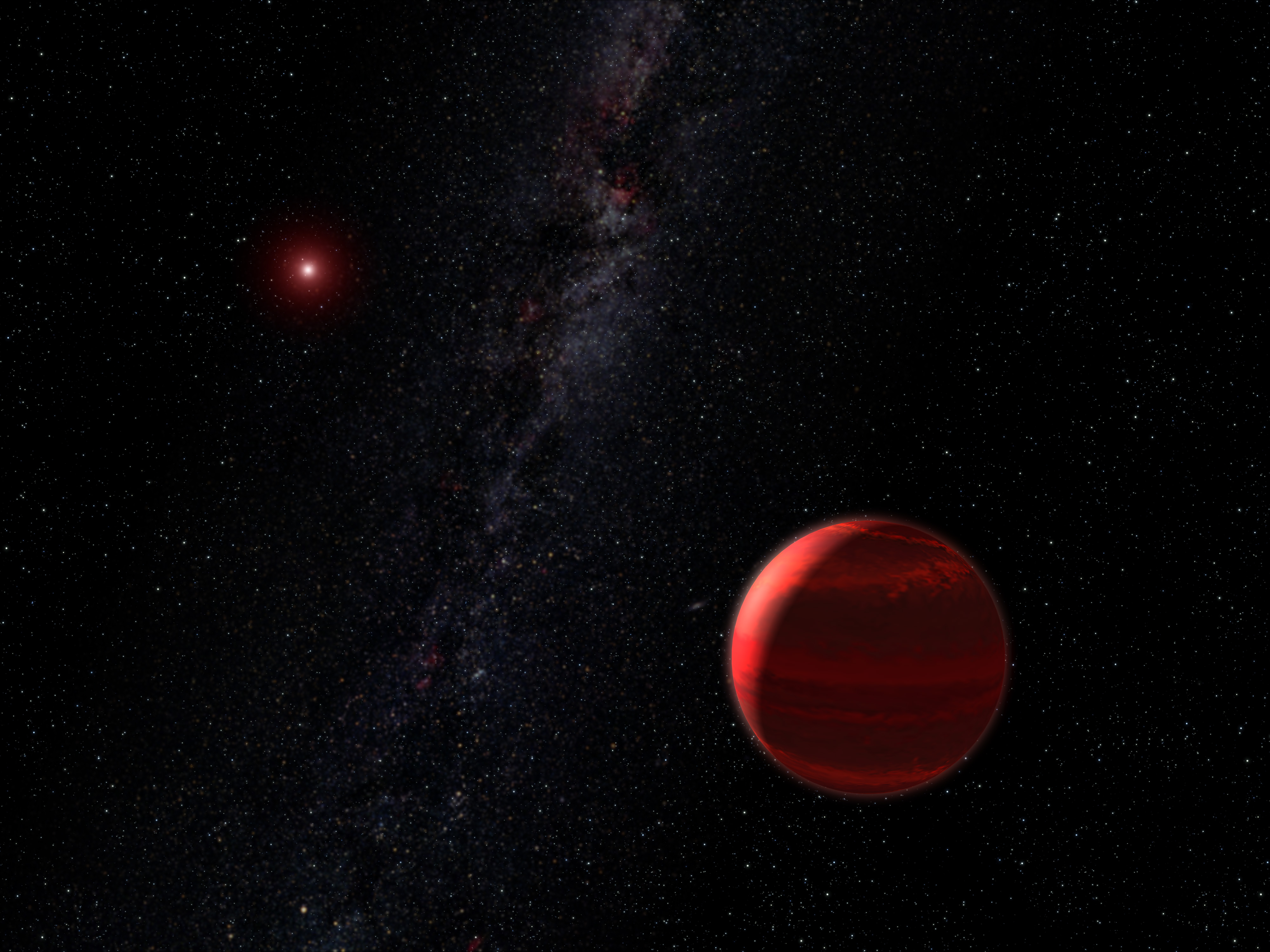
Many astronomers accepted Peter van de Kamp's assertion of a companion or companions to Barnard's Star. He never admitted an error.

Van de Kamp's career at McKormick and Sproul included hours spent on astrometry and advanced telescopic techniques. His attempts to identify extrasolar planets in the manner of Barnard's Star continued. From the 1940s onward, he and his staff made similar claims of planetary systems around the nearby stars Lalande 21185, 61 Cygni, and many others, based on the same flawed photographic plates. All of these claims have been refuted.

Discoveries of numerous planetary systems, accelerating since the 1990s, have confirmed their commonality. A strong proponent of planetary ubiquity, Van de Kamp has gradually been proven correct. On November 14, 2018, the Red Dots Campaign announced that Barnard's Star hosts an exoplanet at least 3.2 times as massive as Earth, though this does not match either of the planets he had claimed. Debate over the existence of a stellar or planetary companion is ongoing within the literature.

== Later life ==
In 1972, he retired from Swarthmore and returned to the Netherlands, where he became Fulbright Professor at the University of Amsterdam. Van de Kamp returned to his native Holland at the end of his life and died in suburban Amsterdam on May 18, 1995, at the age of 93.

=== Music ===
Van de Kamp was a musician, playing piano, viola, and violin. He set aside a musical career in his youth as he considered astronomy more achievable. He helped to organize an orchestra in Charlottesville, which he conducted and included fellow astronomer Alexander Vyssotsky. He also composed music for orchestra as well as for piano. From 1944 to 1954 he was conductor of the Swarthmore College Symphony Orchestra. He combined his musical gifts with another hobby, movies, by playing silent films on Swarthmore campus and accompanying them on the piano. At Swarthmore Van de Kamp performed with Peter Schickele, and made several films of Schickele's student performance, while on the occasion of his 70th birthday Schickele wrote a piano piece for him called The Easy Goin' P. v. d. K. Ever Lovin' Rag. Van de Kamp said that his fondest musical memory was playing chamber music with Albert Einstein, on the evening before the latter's commencement address at Swarthmore College in 1938.

=== Awards and honors ===
In 1965, he was awarded the Rittenhouse Medal by the Rittenhouse Astronomical Society. In 1982, he was awarded the Prix Jules Janssen by the Société Astronomique de France. In 2009 a new observatory at Swarthmore College was named for him. Asteroid 1965 van de Kamp is named after him.

== See also ==
- Lalande 21185 – Claims of planetary systems
- Sarah Lee Lippincott
