= Wulff-Dieter Heintz =

German astronomer (1930–2006)

- Born: 3 June 1930; Würzburg, Germany
- Died: 10 June 2006 (aged 76); Swarthmore, Pennsylvania, United States
- Citizenship: Germany
- Education: Ludwig-Maximilians-Universität München
- Known for: binary stars
- Scientific career
- Fields: astronomy
- Workplaces: Swarthmore College Sproul Observatory

Wulff-Dieter Heintz (3 June 1930 in Würzburg, Germany – 10 June 2006 in Swarthmore, Pennsylvania, United States) was a German astronomer who worked the latter part of his career in the United States. He was Professor Emeritus of Astronomy at Swarthmore College. He specialised in the characterisation of binary stars using astrometry.

== Life ==
Wulff-Dieter Heintz was born in Würzburg, Germany on 3 June 1930. He earned his doctorate in astronomy from the Ludwig-Maximilians-Universität München in 1953. He did research at the University Observatory Munich's Southern Station on Mount Stromlo in Australia. Peter van de Kamp invited him to the Sproul Observatory to be a visiting professor in 1969. He subsequently joined the staff and became observatory director upon the retirement of van de Kamp in 1972. He remained a German citizen. He was an avid and expert chess player and authored a book on the game in German.

== The Barnard's Star affair ==
Peter van de Kamp, Wulff's predecessor at Swarthmore, made claims since the 1960s of a planetary system around Barnard's Star. After van de Kamp's retirement in 1972, the photographic plates made using the Sproul refractor telescope were shown to be flawed, affecting Van de Kamp's Barnard's Star claim as well as claims of planetary systems around other near-by stars made at the same time by staff astronomer Sarah Lippincott. Upon his assumption of directorship in 1973, Wulff began questioning the findings of his former colleague and began publishing criticisms from 1976 onwards; Van de Kamp never admitted any error and the two friends are reported to have become estranged over this affair.

== Later life and death ==
Heintz retired from active teaching in 1998 but remained a frequent and popular guest at the college. He died on 10 June 2006, in Swarthmore, Pennsylvania after a two-year battle with cancer. He was 76.
