= Sarah Lee Lippincott =

American astronomer (1920–2019)

- Swarthmore College photograph
- Born: October 26, 1920
- Died: February 28, 2019 (aged 98); Kennett Square, Pennsylvania, U.S.
- Burial place: West Laurel Hill Cemetery, Bala Cynwyd, Pennsylvania, U.S.
- Known for: Binary stars
- Scientific career
- Fields: Astronomy
- Workplaces: Swarthmore College Sproul Observatory

Sarah Lee Lippincott (October 26, 1920 – February 28, 2019), also known as Sarah Lee Zimmerman, was an American astronomer. She was a professor of astronomy and director of the Sproul Observatory at Swarthmore College. She was a pioneer in the use of astrometry to determine the character of binary stars and search for extrasolar planets.

== Early life and education ==
Lippincott was born October 26, 1920. She attended the University of Pennsylvania College for Women and played on the field hockey and basketball teams. She was a member of the Kappa Kappa Gamma sorority.

She received a Bachelor of Arts degree from the University of Pennsylvania in 1941 and a Master of Arts from Swarthmore College in 1942. She received an honorary doctorate in science in 1973 from Villanova University.

== Career ==
She worked as a research assistant in astronomy at Swarthmore College in 1942. She was promoted to research associate in 1952 and became a lecturer in 1961. She became a professor of astronomy and director of the Sproul Observatory. She worked with Peter van de Kamp on astrometry projects between 1945 and his retirement in 1972, when she became observatory director. She wrote his obituary when he died in 1995.

She conducted numerous astrometric studies of nearby stars with van de Kamp in the search for extrasolar planets. She reported the discovery of several objects of substellar mass and proposed a 0.01 solar-mass planetary companion to the star Lalande 21185 in 1951. The same proposal of planetary objects was made for a number of other stars, as well. Claims for the smaller planetary objects were never confirmed and gradually have become discredited. However, she was quite successful in using the same techniques for characterizing many binary star systems. Her 1951 calculations of the orbit of the difficult astronomical binary star system Ross 614 were used to successfully find and image the system's secondary star. These calculations were used by Walter Baade to find and optically resolve this binary system for the first time using the then new 5 m (200 in) Hale Telescope at the Palomar Observatory in California.

She published over 100 academic papers, her last published astronomy research papers were in 1983. In 2009, she attended the dedication ceremony for the new Peter van de Kamp observatory at Swarthmore College.

Lippincott died on February 28, 2019, in Kennett Square, Pennsylvania. She was interred at West Laurel Hill Cemetery in Bala Cynwyd, Pennsylvania.

== Honors and awards ==
In 1966, she received the Kappa Kappa Gamma Alumnae Achievement Award.

In 1973, she was awarded an honorary doctor of science by Villanova University.

In 1976, she was elected to the Distinguished Daughters of Pennsylvania.

== Personal life ==
She was the third wife of Dave Garroway, the founding host of NBC's Today show. Garroway had an active interest in astronomy, and they met on a tour of observatories in the Soviet Union that she was hosting. After Garroway's death by suicide at their home in 1982, she helped establish the Dave Garroway Laboratory for the Study of Depression at the University of Pennsylvania. She was remarried to Christian B. Zimmerman.

== Publications ==
=== Books ===
Lippincott authored two books, with coauthors:

- Philadelphia: The Unexpected City; with Laurence Lafore; Publisher: Doubleday & Co.; 1st edition (January 1, 1965); ASIN: B002LQQJR4
- Point to the Stars – Revised Edition; with Joseph Maron Joseph; Publisher: McGraw-Hill Book Company (1967); ASIN: B002BG231A

=== Papers ===
Lippincott published over one hundred papers in her career. These are two typical examples:

- A determination of the parallax and mass-ratio of 6 Equulei by van de Kamp, Peter and Lippincott, Sarah Lee, Astronomical Journal, Volume 51, Page 162 (1945)
- An unseen companion to 36 Ursae Majoris A from analysis of plates taken with the Sproul 61-CM refractor by Lippincott, S. L. Astronomical Society of the Pacific, Publications, Volume 95, Pages 775–777 (1983)
