= John L. Hershey =

American astronomer

John L Hershey was an American astronomer who worked at the Sproul Observatory during 1960s and 1970s. Hershey worked alongside Peter van de Kamp, cataloguing thousands of stars. Before coming to Swarthmore, Hershey was interim director of the M.T. Brackbill Planetarium in the Suter Science Center at Eastern Mennonite University in Harrisonburg Virginia from 1958-1960. In 1966 he earned his Master's in Astronomy from the University of Virginia. He completed his doctorate at University of Virginia in 1969.

His doctoral thesis was model atmospheres and strong-line profiles for late-type dwarfs. This prepared him for the work with van de Kamp at Sproul. A 1975 paper describes a greatly enhanced method for processing thousands of telescopic plates taken at the observatory.
