= Barnard's Star =

Red dwarf star in the constellation Ophiuchus

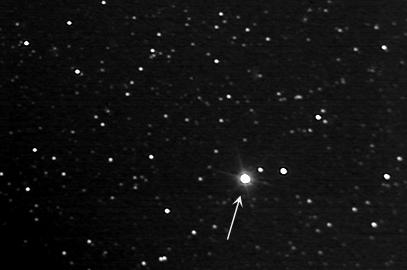
- Image of Barnard's Star and its surroundings, c. 2006 (south is up)

Observation data Epoch J2000.0 Equinox ICRS
- Constellation: Ophiuchus
- Right ascension: 17^{h} 57^{m} 48.49847^{s}
- Declination: +04° 41′ 36.1139″
- Apparent magnitude (V): 9.511

Characteristics
- Evolutionary stage: main sequence
- Spectral type: M4.0V
- Apparent magnitude (U): 12.497
- Apparent magnitude (B): 11.240
- Apparent magnitude (R): 8.298
- Apparent magnitude (I): 6.741
- Apparent magnitude (J): 5.24
- Apparent magnitude (H): 4.83
- Apparent magnitude (K): 4.524
- U−B color index: 1.257
- B−V color index: 1.713
- V−R color index: 1.213
- R−I color index: 1.557
- Variable type: BY Draconis

Astrometry
Radial velocity (R_{v})	−110.47±0.13 km/s
Proper motion (μ)	RA: −801.551 mas/yr Dec.: 10362.394 mas/yr
Parallax (π)	546.9759±0.0401 mas
Distance	5.9629 ± 0.0004 ly (1.8282 ± 0.0001 pc)
Absolute magnitude (M_{V})	13.21

Details
Mass	0.162±0.007 M_{☉}
Radius	0.187±0.001 R_{☉}
Luminosity (bolometric)	0.00340±0.00006 L_{☉}
Luminosity (visual, L_{V})	0.0004 L_{☉}
Surface gravity (log g)	4.90±0.09 cgs
Temperature	3,195±28 K
Metallicity [Fe/H]	−0.56±0.07 dex
Rotation	114.06±2.30 days
Age	≈ 10 Gyr

Other designations
- Proxima Ophiuchi, "Barnard's Runaway Star", "Greyhound of the Skies", V2500 Ophiuchi, BD+04°3561a, GJ 699, HIP 87937, LFT 1385, LHS 57, LTT 15309, 2MASS J17574849+0441405, GCTP 4098.00, Gl 140-024, Karmn J17578+046, Munich 15040, Vyssotsky 799, Latin: Velox Barnardi

Database references
SIMBAD	data
Exoplanet Archive	data
ARICNS	data
- Location of Barnard's Star in the constellation Ophiuchus

Barnard's Star is a small red dwarf star in the constellation of Ophiuchus. At a distance of 5.96 light-years (1.83 pc) from Earth, it is the fourth-nearest-known individual star to the Sun after the three components of the Alpha Centauri system, and is the closest star in the northern celestial hemisphere. Its stellar mass is about 16% of the Sun's, and it has 19% of the Sun's diameter. Despite its proximity, the star has a dim apparent visual magnitude of +9.5 and is invisible to the unaided eye; it is much brighter in the infrared than in visible light.

Barnard's Star is among the most studied red dwarfs because of its proximity and favorable location for observation near the celestial equator. Historically, research on Barnard's Star has focused on measuring its stellar characteristics, its astrometry, and also refining the limits of possible extrasolar planets. Although Barnard's Star is ancient, it still experiences stellar flare events, one being observed in 1998.

Barnard's Star hosts a system of four close-orbiting, sub-Earth-mass planets (Barnard's Star b, c, d & e). Multiple claims for a planetary system had been proposed since the beginning of the twentieth century, notably by Peter van de Kamp in the 1960s, but none were supported by follow-up studies, until the now known four-planet system was discovered by two independent teams of astronomers in 2024–2025.

== Discovery and naming ==
The star is named after Edward Emerson Barnard, an American astronomer who in 1916 measured its proper motion as 10.3 arcseconds per year relative to the Sun, the highest known for any star. The star had previously appeared on Harvard University photographic plates in 1888 and 1890.

In 2016, the International Astronomical Union organized a Working Group on Star Names (WGSN) to catalogue and standardize proper names for stars. The WGSN approved the name Barnard's Star for this star on 1 February 2017 and it is now included in the List of IAU-approved Star Names.

== Description ==
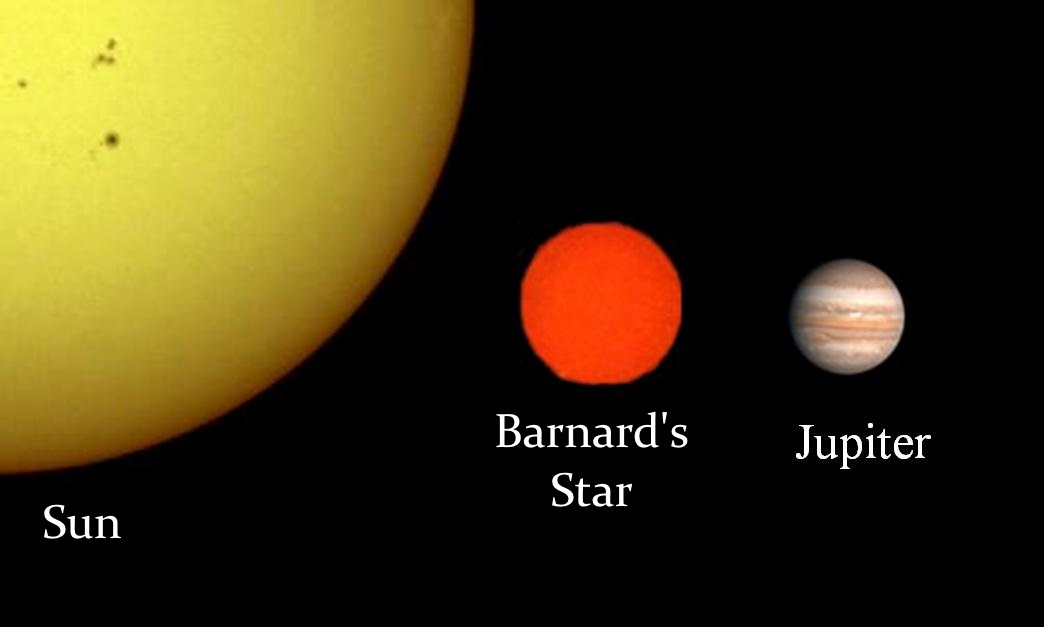
Size comparison between Jupiter, Barnard's Star, and the Sun

Barnard's Star is a red dwarf of the dim spectral type M4 and is too faint to see without a telescope; its apparent magnitude is 9.5.

At 7–12 billion years of age, Barnard's Star is considerably older than the Sun, which is 4.5 billion years old, and it might be among the oldest stars in the Milky Way galaxy. Barnard's Star has lost a great deal of rotational energy; the periodic slight changes in its brightness indicate that it rotates once in 130 days (the Sun rotates in 25). Given its age, Barnard's Star was long assumed to be quiescent in terms of stellar activity. In 1998, astronomers observed an intense stellar flare, showing that Barnard's Star is a flare star. Barnard's Star has the variable star designation V2500 Ophiuchi. In 2003, Barnard's Star presented the first detectable change in the radial velocity of a star caused by its motion. Further variability in the radial velocity of Barnard's Star was attributed to its stellar activity.

Barnard's Star, showing position every 5 years in the period 1985–2005

The proper motion of Barnard's Star corresponds to a relative lateral speed of 90 km/s. The 10.3 arcseconds it travels in a year amount to a quarter of a degree in a human lifetime, roughly half the angular diameter of the full Moon.

The radial velocity of Barnard's Star is −110 km/s, as measured from the blueshift due to its motion toward the Sun. Combined with its proper motion and distance, this gives a "space velocity" (actual speed relative to the Sun) of 142.6±0.2 km/s. Barnard's Star will make its closest approach to the Sun around 11,800 CE, when it will approach to within about 3.75 light-years.

Distances to the nearest stars from 20,000 years ago until 80,000 years in the future

Proxima Centauri is the closest star to the Sun at a current position of 4.24 light-years away. However, despite Barnard's Star's projected nearer position in 11,800 CE, it will still not then be the solar system's nearest star—since by that time, Proxima Centauri will have moved to a yet-nearer proximity. At the time of the star's closest pass by the Sun, Barnard's Star will still be too dim to be seen with the naked eye—its apparent magnitude will only have increased by one magnitude to about 8.5, still being 2.5 magnitudes short for unaided human observation.

Barnard's Star has a mass of about 0.16 solar masses (M_{☉}), and a radius about 0.2 times that of the Sun. Thus, although Barnard's Star has roughly 150 times the mass of Jupiter (M_{J}), its radius is only roughly twice as large, due to its much higher density. Its effective temperature is about 3,220 kelvin, and it has a luminosity of only 0.0034 solar luminosities. Barnard's Star is so faint that if it were at the same distance from Earth as the Sun is, it would appear only 100 times brighter than a full moon, comparable to the brightness of the Sun at 80 astronomical units.

Barnard's Star has 10–32% of the solar metallicity. Metallicity is the proportion of stellar mass made up of elements heavier than helium and helps classify stars relative to the galactic population. Barnard's Star seems to be typical of the old, red dwarf population II stars, yet these are also generally metal-poor halo stars. While sub-solar, Barnard's Star's metallicity is higher than that of a halo star and is in keeping with the low end of the metal-rich disk star range; this, plus its high space motion, have led to the designation "intermediate population II star", between a halo and disk star. However, some recently published scientific papers have given much higher estimates for the metallicity of the star, very close to the Sun's level, between 75 and 125% of the solar metallicity.

== Planetary system ==
Planets of Barnard's Star

In August 2024, by using data from ESPRESSO spectrograph of the Very Large Telescope, the existence of an exoplanet with a minimum mass of 0.37±0.05 M_{🜨} and orbital period of 3.15 days was confirmed. This constituted the first convincing evidence for a planet orbiting Barnard's Star. Additionally, three other candidate low-mass planets were proposed in this study. All of these planets orbit closer to the star than the habitable zone. The confirmed planet is designated Barnard's Star b (or Barnard b), a re-use of the designation originally used for the refuted super-Earth candidate. An examination of TESS photometry revealed no planetary transits, implying that the system is not viewed edge-on.

In March 2025, an independent follow-up study led by Ritvik Basant confirmed all four planets. The data ruled out planets with masses greater than 0.57 M_{🜨} in the habitable zone of Barnard's Star with 99% confidence. With a minimum mass of only 0.193 M_{🜨}, Barnard's Star e is the least massive exoplanet yet detected by the radial velocity method. The best-fit orbital solution implies the planets have slightly eccentric orbits, but simulations suggest that these orbits would be unstable. The planets exist, so their eccentricities may be overestimated. A Bayesian stability study led by Xander Byrne found that the planets' masses are highly unlikely to be more than 60% larger than their minimum masses.

The Barnard's Star planetary system
Companion (in order from star)	Minimum mass (M_{⊕})	Maximum mass (M_{⊕})	Semi-major axis (AU)	Orbital period (days)	Eccentricity	Inclination	Radius (R_{⊕})
d	0.263±0.024	0.45	0.0188±0.0003	2.3402±0.0003	0.04+0.05 −0.03	>20	—
b	0.299±0.026	0.51	0.0229±0.0003	3.1542±0.0004	0.03+0.03 −0.02	20–87.9	~0.75 (Note: Estimated using an empirical mass–radius relation)
c	0.335±0.030	0.57	0.0274±0.0004	4.1244±0.0006	0.08+0.06 −0.05	>20	—
e	0.193±0.033	0.34	0.0381±0.0005	6.7392±0.0028	0.04+0.04 −0.03	>20	—

=== Previous planetary claims ===
Barnard's Star has been subject to multiple claims of planets that were later disproven. From the early 1960s to the early 1970s, Peter van de Kamp argued that planets orbited Barnard's Star. His specific claims of large gas giants were refuted in the mid-1970s after much debate. In November 2018, a candidate super-Earth planetary companion was reported to orbit Barnard's Star. It was believed to have a minimum mass of 3.2 M_{🜨} and orbit at 0.4 AU. However, work presented in July 2021 refuted the existence of this planet.

==== Astrometric planetary claims ====
For a decade from 1963 to about 1973, a substantial number of astronomers accepted a claim by Peter van de Kamp that he had detected, by using astrometry, a perturbation in the proper motion of Barnard's Star consistent with its having one or more planets comparable in mass with Jupiter. Van de Kamp had been observing the star from 1938, attempting, with colleagues at the Sproul Observatory at Swarthmore College, to find minuscule variations of one micrometre in its position on photographic plates consistent with orbital perturbations that would indicate a planetary companion; this involved as many as ten people averaging their results in looking at plates, to avoid systemic individual errors. Van de Kamp's initial suggestion was a planet having about 1.6 M_{J} at a distance of 4.4 AU in a slightly eccentric orbit, and these measurements were apparently refined in a 1969 paper. Later that year, Van de Kamp suggested that there were two planets of 1.1 and 0.8 M_{J}.

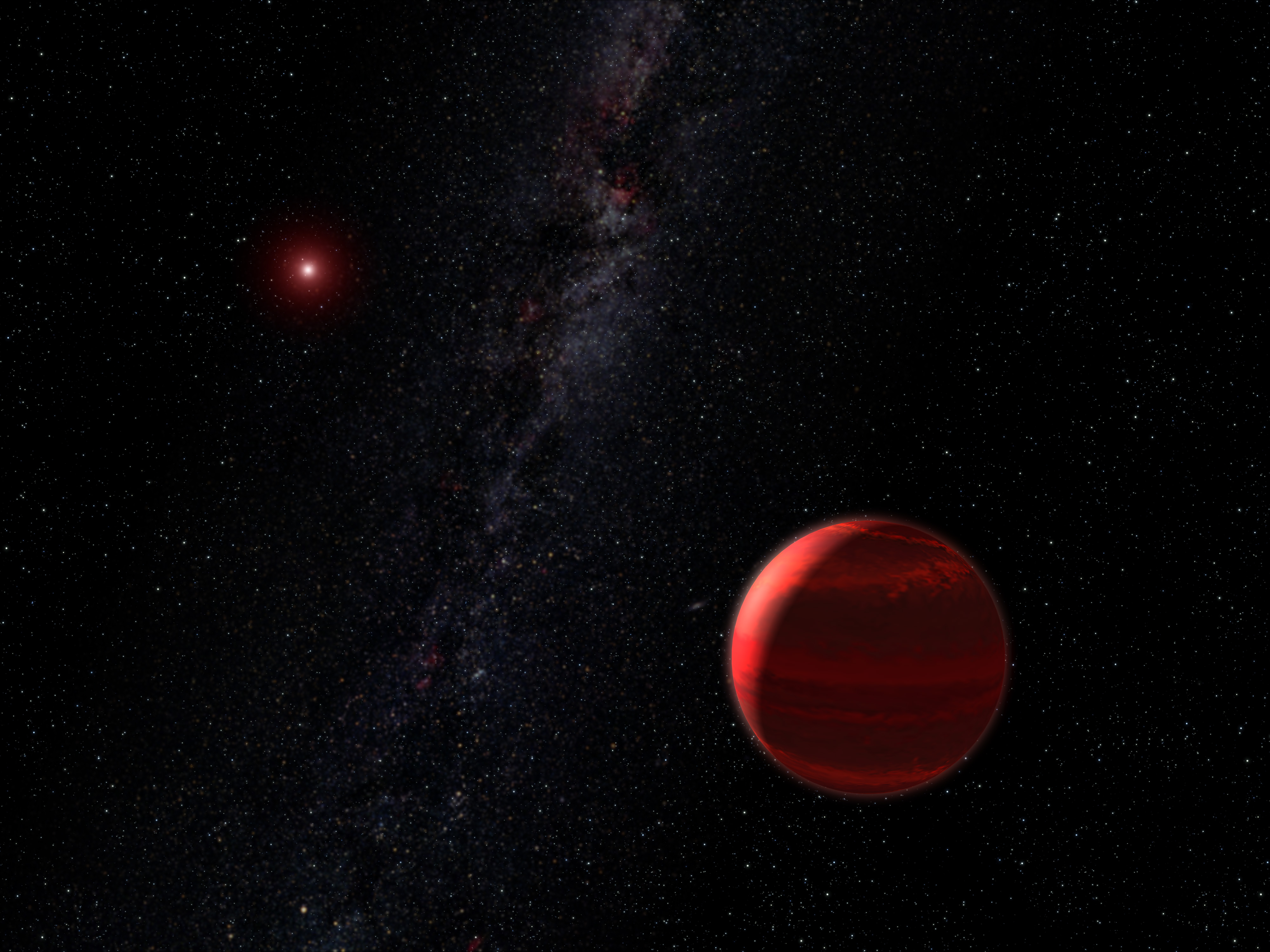
Artist's conception of a planet in orbit around a red dwarf

Other astronomers subsequently repeated Van de Kamp's measurements, and two papers in 1973 undermined the claim of a planet or planets. George Gatewood and Heinrich Eichhorn, at a different observatory and using newer plate measuring techniques, failed to verify the planetary companion. Another paper published by John L. Hershey four months earlier, also using the Swarthmore observatory, found that changes in the astrometric field of various stars correlated to the timing of adjustments and modifications that had been carried out on the refractor telescope's objective lens; the claimed planet was attributed to an artifact of maintenance and upgrade work. The affair has been discussed as part of a broader scientific review.

Van de Kamp never acknowledged any error and published a further claim of two planets' existence as late as 1982; he died in 1995. Wulff Heintz, Van de Kamp's successor at Swarthmore and an expert on double stars, questioned his findings and began publishing criticisms from 1976 onwards. The two men were reported to have become estranged because of this.

==== Refuted 2018 planetary claim ====
Barnard's Star was one of the targets of the Red Dots campaign, an effort by astronomers to search for planetary companions around nearby red dwarf stars. The project launched in 2017. The Arecibo Observatory, the National Science Foundation and the Planetary Habitability Laboratory of the University of Puerto Rico were the main participating institutions.

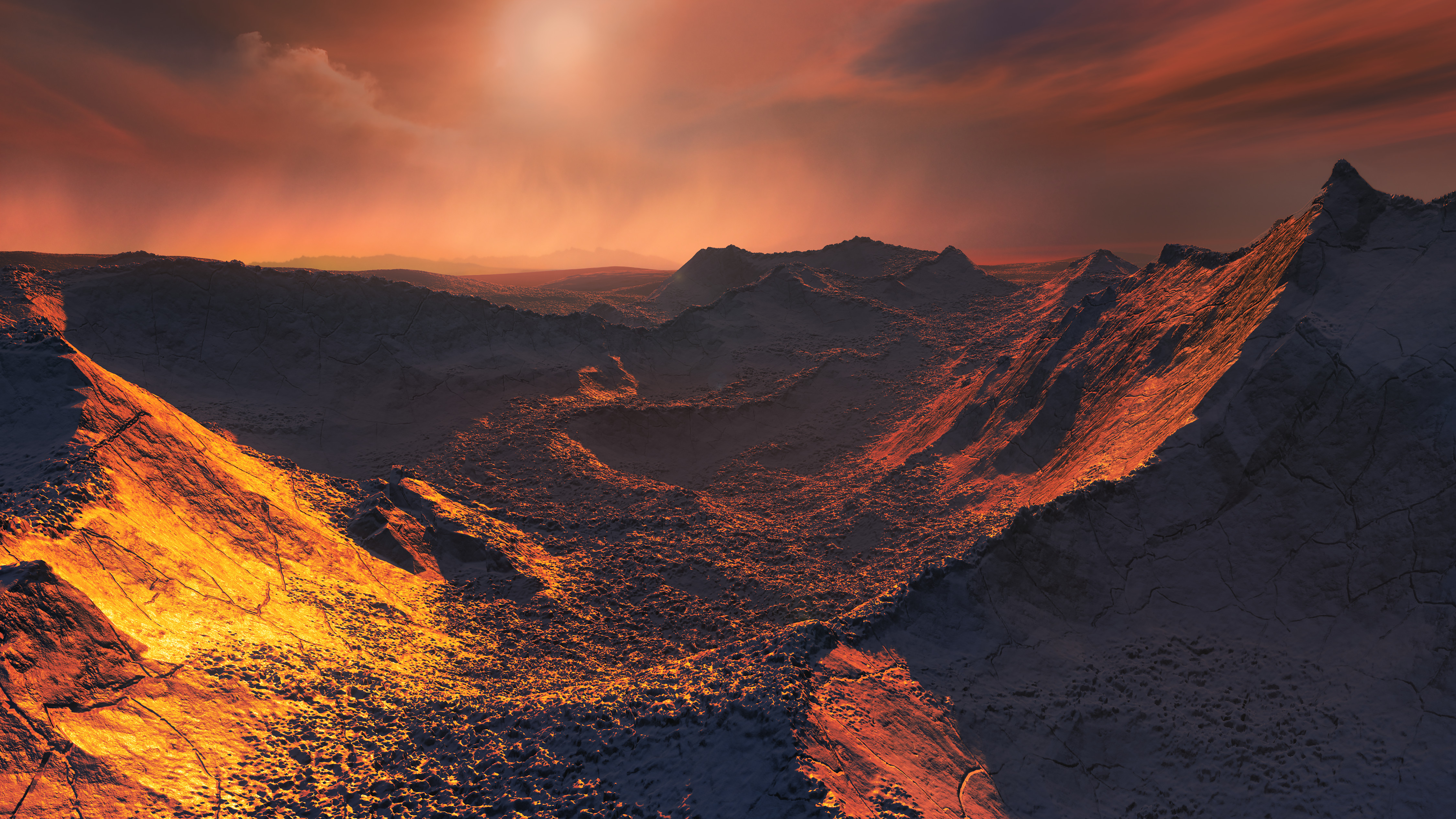
Artist's impression of the surface of a super-Earth orbiting Barnard's Star

In November 2018, an international team of astronomers announced the detection by radial velocity of a candidate super-Earth orbiting in relatively close proximity to Barnard's Star. The discovery team, led by Ignasi Ribas of Spain, involved both Red Dots and CARMENES. However, the existence of the planet was refuted in 2021, when the radial velocity signal was found to originate from long-term activity on the star itself, related to its rotation. Further studies in the following years confirmed this result.

Dubbed Barnard's Star b, the planet was thought to be near the stellar system's snow line, which is an ideal spot for the icy accretion of proto-planetary material. It was thought to orbit at 0.4 AU every 233 days and had a proposed minimum mass of 3.2 M_{🜨}. The planet would have most likely been frigid, with an estimated surface temperature of about −170 °C (−274 °F), and lie outside Barnard Star's presumed habitable zone. Direct imaging of the planet and its tell-tale light signature would have been possible in the decade after its discovery. Further faint and unaccounted-for perturbations in the system suggested there may be a second planetary companion even farther out.

==== Refining planetary boundaries ====
For the more than four decades between van de Kamp's rejected claim and the eventual announcement of a planet candidate, Barnard's Star was carefully studied and the mass and orbital boundaries for possible planets were slowly tightened. M dwarfs such as Barnard's Star are more easily studied than larger stars in this regard because their lower masses render perturbations more obvious.

Null results for planetary companions continued throughout the 1980s and 1990s, including interferometric work with the Hubble Space Telescope in 1999. Gatewood was able to show in 1995 that planets with 10 M_{J} were impossible around Barnard's Star, in a paper which helped refine the negative certainty regarding planetary objects in general. In 1999, the Hubble work further excluded planetary companions of 0.8 M_{J} with an orbital period of less than 1,000 days (Jupiter's orbital period is 4,332 days), while Kuerster determined in 2003 that within the habitable zone around Barnard's Star, planets are not possible with an "M sin i" value (Note: "M sin i" means the mass of the planet times the sine of the angle of inclination of its orbit, and hence provides the minimum mass for the planet.) greater than 7.5 times the mass of the Earth (M_{🜨}), or with a mass greater than 3.1 times the mass of Neptune (much lower than van de Kamp's smallest suggested value).

In 2013, a research paper was published that further refined planet mass boundaries for the star. Using radial velocity measurements, taken over a period of 25 years, from the Lick and Keck Observatories and applying Monte Carlo analysis for both circular and eccentric orbits, upper masses for planets out to 1,000-day orbits were determined. Planets above two Earth masses in orbits of less than 10 days were excluded, and planets of more than ten Earth masses out to a two-year orbit were also confidently ruled out. It was also discovered that the habitable zone of the star seemed to be devoid of roughly Earth-mass planets or larger, save for face-on orbits.

Even though this research greatly restricted the possible properties of planets around Barnard's Star, it did not rule them out completely as terrestrial planets were always going to be difficult to detect. NASA's Space Interferometry Mission, which was to begin searching for extrasolar Earth-like planets, was reported to have chosen Barnard's Star as an early search target, however the mission was shut down in 2010. ESA's similar Darwin interferometry mission had the same goal, but was stripped of funding in 2007.

The analysis of radial velocities that eventually led to the announcement of a candidate super-Earth orbiting Barnard's Star was also used to set more precise upper mass limits for possible planets, up to and within the habitable zone: a maximum of 0.7 M_{🜨} up to the inner edge and 1.2 M_{🜨} on the outer edge of the optimistic habitable zone, corresponding to orbital periods of up to 10 and 40 days respectively. Therefore, it appears that Barnard's Star indeed does not host Earth-mass planets or larger, in hot and temperate orbits, unlike other M-dwarf stars that commonly have these types of planets in close-in orbits.

== Stellar flares ==
=== 1998 ===
In 1998 a stellar flare on Barnard's Star was detected based on changes in the spectral emissions on 17 July during an unrelated search for variations in the proper motion. Four years passed before the flare was fully analyzed, at which point it was suggested that the flare's temperature was 8,000 K, more than twice the normal temperature of the star. Given the essentially random nature of flares, Diane Paulson, one of the authors of that study, noted that "the star would be fantastic for amateurs to observe".

The flare was surprising because intense stellar activity is not expected in stars of such age. Flares are not completely understood, but are believed to be caused by strong magnetic fields, which suppress plasma convection and lead to sudden outbursts: strong magnetic fields occur in rapidly rotating stars, while old stars tend to rotate slowly. For Barnard's Star to undergo an event of such magnitude is thus presumed to be a rarity. Research on the star's periodicity, or changes in stellar activity over a given timescale, also suggest it ought to be quiescent; 1998 research showed weak evidence for periodic variation in the star's brightness, noting only one possible starspot over 130 days.

Stellar activity of this sort has created interest in using Barnard's Star as a proxy to understand similar stars. It is hoped that photometric studies of its X-ray and UV emissions will shed light on the large population of old M dwarfs in the galaxy. Such research has astrobiological implications: given that the habitable zones of M dwarfs are close to the star, any planet located therein would be strongly affected by solar flares, stellar winds, and plasma ejection events.

=== 2019 ===
In 2019, two additional ultraviolet stellar flares were detected, each with far-ultraviolet energy of 3×10^{22} joules, together with one X-ray stellar flare with energy 1.6×10^{22} joules. The flare rate observed to date is enough to cause loss of 87 Earth atmospheres per billion years through thermal processes and ≈3 Earth atmospheres per billion years through ion loss processes on Barnard's Star b.

== Environment ==
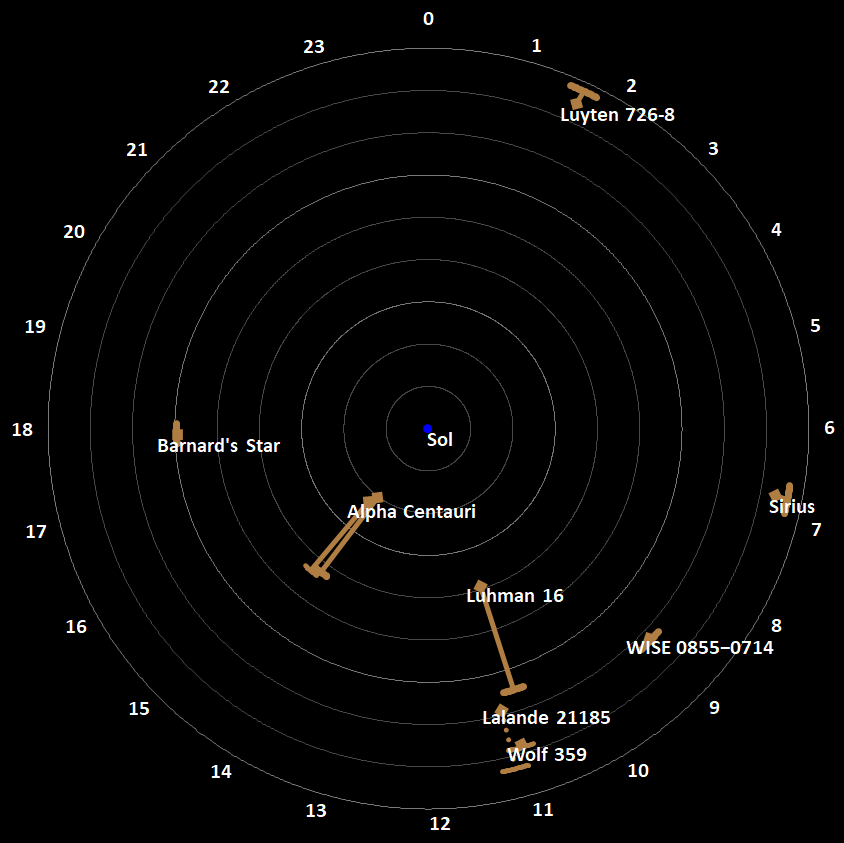
The position of Barnard's Star on a radar map among all stellar objects or stellar systems within 9 light years (ly) from the map's center, the Sun (Sol).

Barnard's Star shares much the same neighborhood as the Sun. The neighbors of Barnard's Star are generally of red dwarf size, the smallest and most common star type. Its closest neighbor is currently the red dwarf Ross 154, at a distance of 1.66 parsecs (5.41 light-years). The Sun (5.98 light-years) and Alpha Centauri (6.47 light-years) are, respectively, the next closest systems. From Barnard's Star, the Sun would appear on the diametrically opposite side of the sky at coordinates RA=5^{h} 57^{m} 48.5^{s}, Dec=−04° 41′ 36″, in the westernmost part of the constellation Monoceros. The absolute magnitude of the Sun is 4.83, and at a distance of 1.834 parsecs, it would be a first-magnitude star, as Pollux is from the Earth. (Note: The Sun's apparent magnitude from Barnard's Star, assuming negligible extinction: $\begin{smallmatrix} m = 4.83 + 5\cdot((\log_{10} 1.834) - 1) = 1.15 \end{smallmatrix}$.)

== Proposed exploration ==
=== Project Daedalus ===
Barnard's Star was studied as part of Project Daedalus. Undertaken between 1973 and 1978, the study suggested that rapid, uncrewed travel to another star system was possible with existing or near-future technology. Barnard's Star was chosen as a target partly because it was believed to have planets.

The theoretical model suggested that a nuclear pulse rocket employing nuclear fusion (specifically, electron bombardment of deuterium and helium-3) and accelerating for four years could achieve a velocity of 12% of the speed of light. The star could then be reached in 50 years, within a human lifetime. Along with detailed investigation of the star and any companions, the interstellar medium would be examined and baseline astrometric readings performed.

The initial Project Daedalus model sparked further theoretical research. In 1980, Robert Freitas suggested a more ambitious plan: a self-replicating spacecraft intended to search for and make contact with extraterrestrial life. Built and launched in Jupiter's orbit, it would reach Barnard's Star in 47 years under parameters similar to those of the original Project Daedalus. Once at the star, it would begin automated self-replication, constructing a factory, initially to manufacture exploratory probes and eventually to create a copy of the original spacecraft after 1,000 years.

== See also ==
- Kepler-42 – Nearly identical to Barnard's star, and hosts three sub-Earth sized planets.
- Teegarden's Star – Red dwarf star in the constellation Aries.
