= Ross 154 =

Star in the constellation Sagittarius

- Location of Ross 154 in the constellation Sagittarius

Observation data Epoch J2000 Equinox ICRS
- Constellation: Sagittarius
- Right ascension: 18^{h} 49^{m} 49.36378^{s}
- Declination: −23° 50′ 10.4474″
- Apparent magnitude (V): 10.44

Characteristics
- Spectral type: M3.5V
- B−V color index: 1.76
- Variable type: Flare star

Astrometry
Radial velocity (R_{v})	−11.12±0.57 km/s
Proper motion (μ)	RA: +639.368 mas/yr Dec.: −193.958 mas/yr
Parallax (π)	336.0266±0.0317 mas
Distance	9.7063 ± 0.0009 ly (2.9760 ± 0.0003 pc)
Absolute magnitude (M_{V})	13.07

Details
Mass	0.177±0.004 M_{☉}
Radius	0.200±0.008 R_{☉}
Luminosity	0.004015±0.000048 L_{☉}
Surface gravity (log g)	5.23±0.11 cgs
Temperature	3,340±30 K
Metallicity [Fe/H]	−0.63±0.1 dex
Rotation	2.848±0.001 days
Rotational velocity (v sin i)	3.0±1.5 km/s
Age	0.2–0.6 Gyr

Other designations
- V1216 Sgr, CD−23°14742, GJ 729, HIP 92403, LHS 3414, PLX 4338, Ross 154

Database references
SIMBAD	data
ARICNS	data

Ross 154 (V1216 Sagittarii) is a red dwarf star in the southern zodiac constellation of Sagittarius. It has an apparent visual magnitude of 10.44, making it much too faint to be seen with the naked eye. At a minimum, viewing Ross 154 requires a telescope with an aperture of 6.5 cm (3 in) under ideal conditions. The distance to this star can be estimated from parallax measurements, which places it at 9.71 light-years (2.98 parsecs) away from Earth. It is the nearest star in the southern constellation Sagittarius, and one of the nearest stars to the Sun.

== Description ==
This star was first catalogued by American astronomer Frank Elmore Ross in 1925, and formed part of his fourth list of new variable stars. In 1926, he added it to his second list of stars showing a measurable proper motion after comparing its position with photographic plates taken earlier by fellow American astronomer E. E. Barnard. A preliminary parallax value of 0.362±0.006 arcseconds was determined in 1937 by Walter O'Connell using photographic plates from the Yale telescope in Johannesburg, South Africa. This placed the star at the sixth position of the then-known nearby stars.

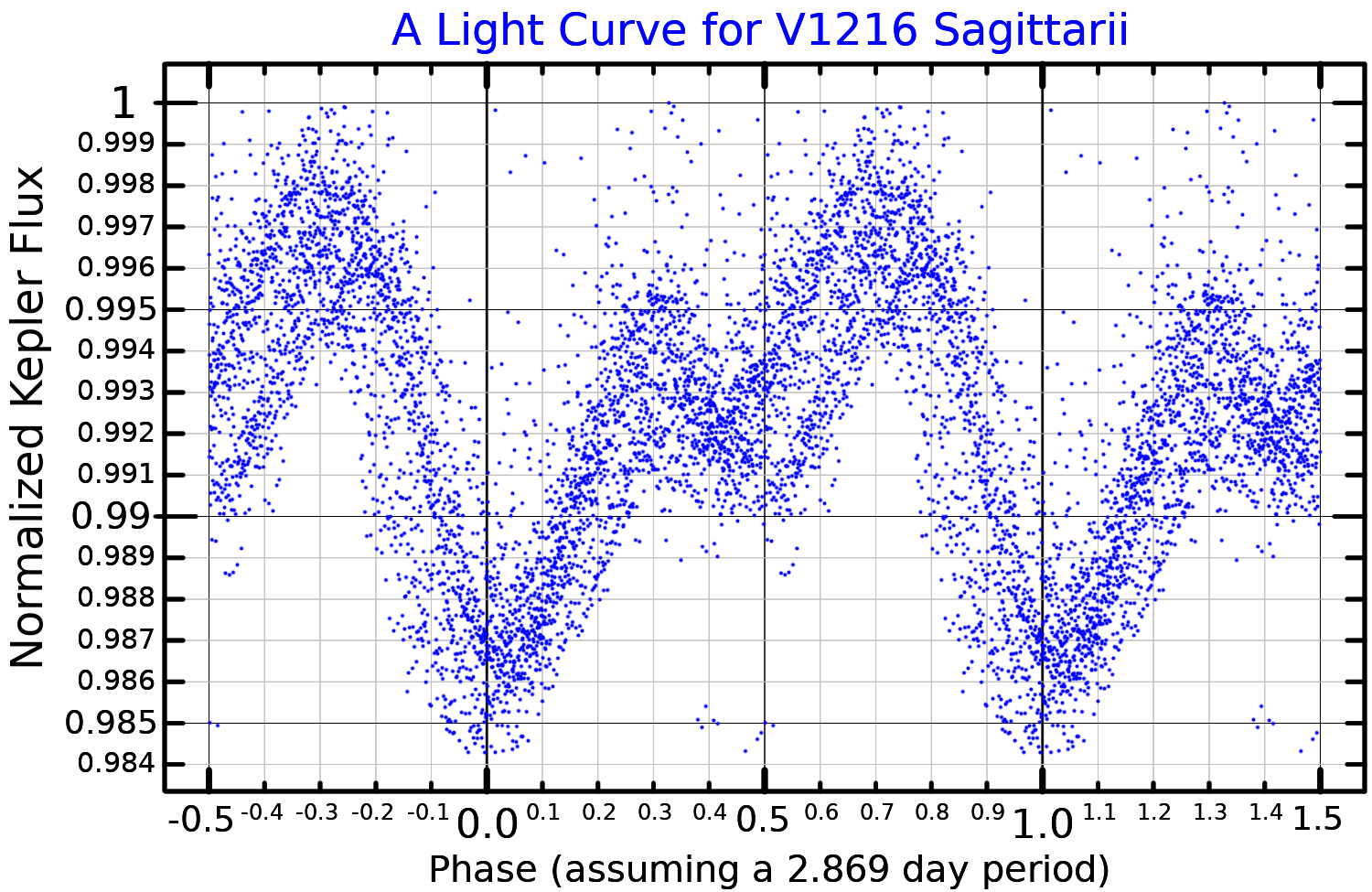
A broadband optical light curve for V1216 Sagittarii, plotted from Kepler data

Ross 154 was found to be a UV Ceti-type flare star, with a mean time between major flares of about two days. The first such flare activity was observed from Australia in 1951 when the star increased in magnitude by 0.4. Typically, the star will increase by 3–4 magnitudes during a flare. The strength of the star's surface magnetic field is an estimated 2.2±0.1 kG. Ross 154 is an X-ray source and it has been detected by several X-ray observatories. The quiescent X-ray luminosity is about 9×10^{27} ergs/s. X-ray flare emission from this star has been observed by Chandra observatory, with a particularly large flare emitting 2.3×10^{33} erg.

A stellar classification of M3.5V makes this a red dwarf star that is generating energy through the nuclear fusion of hydrogen at its core. It has an estimated 18% of the Sun's mass and 20% of the Sun's radius, but it is radiating only 0.4% of the luminosity of the Sun. In contrast to the Sun where convection only occurs in the outer layers, a red dwarf with a mass this low will be entirely convective. Based on the relatively high projected rotation, this is probably a young star with an estimated age of less than a billion years. The abundance of elements heavier than helium is about half that in the Sun.

The space velocity components of this star in the galactic coordinate system are [U, V, W] = [–12.2, –1.0, –7.2] km s^{−1}. It has not been identified as a member of a specific stellar moving group and is orbiting through the Milky Way galaxy at a distance from the core that varies from 27.65–30.66 kly (8.48–9.40 kpc) with an orbital eccentricity of 0.052. Based on its low velocity relative to the Sun, this is believed to be a young disk (population I) star, though it has a lower metallicity than the Sun. This star will make its closest approach to the Sun in about 157,000 years, when it comes within 6.39 ± 0.10 ly (1.959 ± 0.031 pc).

== Search for planets ==
No brown dwarf or gas giant companions have been discovered in orbit around Ross 154. Nor does it display the level of excess infrared emission that would suggest the presence of circumstellar dust. Such debris disks are rare among M-type star systems older than about 10 million years, having been primarily cleared away by drag from the stellar wind.

Ross 154 was observed with the HARPS spectrograph in 2017 as part of the Red Dots campaign, and has also been observed with the CARMENES spectrograph. These observations show radial velocity variations with a 7-day period, which could be due to either an orbiting super-Earth planet (minimum mass 1.5~2 M_{🜨}) or intrinsic stellar activity. Further observations are needed to confirm or refute the presence of a planet.
