= Heinrich Eichhorn =

Austrian astronomer

Heinrich Karl Eichhorn (b. 1927 d. 1999) was an Austrian astronomer and astrometric theoretician. Born in Vienna, Eichorn did the bulk of his work in the United States at the University of South Florida. He completed his doctoral studies in Austria in 1949 and did his post-doc work in Virginia, Washington D.C., and Connecticut. Eichorn's expertise included parallaxes, proper motions, and visual binary orbits.
