= Sproul Observatory =

Observatory in Pennsylvania, United States (1913–2017)

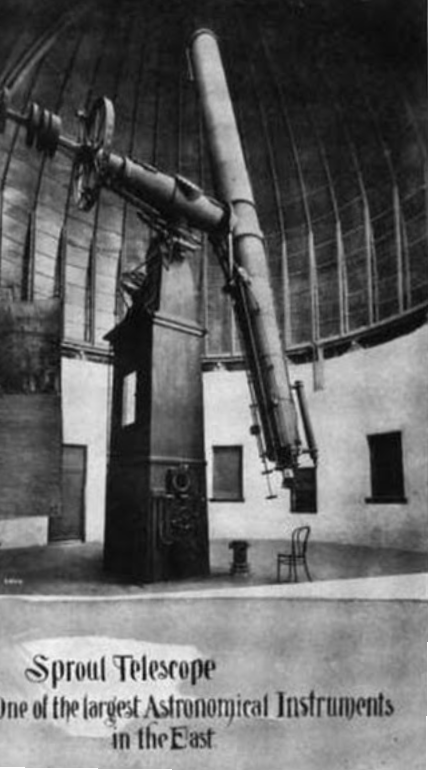
- Organization: Swarthmore College
- Location: Swarthmore, PA
- Coordinates: 39°54′13″N 75°21′19″W
- Altitude: 60 m (200 ft)
- Closed: 31 July 2017
- Website: www.cs.swarthmore.edu/program/history/sproul.html

Telescopes
- Sproul Telescope: 24 in (61 cm) refractor telescope

Sproul Observatory was an astronomical observatory owned and operated by Swarthmore College. It was located in Swarthmore, Pennsylvania, United States, and named after William Cameron Sproul, the 27th Governor of Pennsylvania, who graduated from Swarthmore in 1891. The 24-inch (61 cm) telescope was moved from Sproul Observatory to Bentonville, Arkansas in July 2017.

== History ==
In 1907, William Cameron Sproul communicated to the Board of Managers of Swarthmore College his desire to donate funds for the purchase of equipment for an astronomical observatory. Sproul was a successful businessman who graduated from Swarthmore in 1891 and a trustee to the college. At the time of the gift, he was serving as Pennsylvania State Senator for the 9th District and went on to become the 27th Governor of Pennsylvania.

The telescope was built in 1911 by the John A. Brashear Company in Pittsburgh, Pennsylvania. When the telescope was installed at the observatory in 1913, it was the largest on the East Coast of the United States and one of the largest in the world.

From 1986 to 2004, the computer science department was given office and lab space in the observatory building.

In 2009, Swarthmore College added the Peter van de Kamp Observatory to the newly built Science Center. The new observatory contained a more technologically advanced 24" reflecting telescope and replaced the Sproul Observatory for education and public outreach purposes.

In 2017, the telescope was dismantled and moved to the Eighth Street Market in Bentonville, Arkansas to be restored, upgraded and used for public outreach. It is now at the NWA Space and Science Center. The book collection of the Sproul Observatory was donated to an astronomy center in Magdalena, New Mexico.

In 2017, Swarthmore unveiled plans to renovate Sproul Observatory which will transform the observatory into the James Hormel and Michael Nguyen Intercultural Center at Sproul Hall which will bring the Intercultural Center, Interfaith Center, Religious and Spiritual Life Center and the Office of International Student Services in one building.

== Directors ==
1. John A. Miller (1923–1938)
2. Peter van de Kamp (1937–1972)
3. Wulff-Dieter Heintz (1973–1982)
4. Sarah L. Lippincott (1982–)

== Planetary discovery controversies ==
Under the direction of Peter van de Kamp this observatory made numerous claims of planetary systems and discoveries based on astrometry using the photographic plates made with the 24 in (61 cm) refractor telescope. These plates were found to have a systematic error that was misinterpreted as the effect of a planetary system on the parent star. This error was identified as early as 1973 and confirmed by the observatory in the 1980s.

== See also ==
- List of astronomical observatories
- Barnard's Star
- Peter van de Kamp
- List of largest optical refracting telescopes
