= De Lalande =

De Lalande may refer to:

- De Lalande (crater), an impact crater on Venus, named for the astronomer
- Hôtel de Lalande, now Musée des Arts Décoratifs et du Design in Bordeaux, France

== People with the surname ==
- Antoine André de Sainte-Marthe de Lalande, chevalier de Sainte-Marthe (1615–1679), French soldier
- Jean de Lalande (died 1646), French Jesuit missionary
- Joseph de Lalande or Jérôme Lalande (1732–1807), French astronomer and writer
- Marie-Jeanne de Lalande (1768–1832), French astronomer and mathematician
- Michel Lefrançois de Lalande (1766–1839), French astronomer
- Michel-Richard de Lalande (1657–1726), French Baroque composer and organist

== See also ==
- Château de Lalande (disambiguation)
- Delalande, a surname
- Lalande (disambiguation)
