= Lalande =

Lalande may refer to:

== People ==
- André Lalande (1913–1995), officer in the French Foreign Legion
- André Lalande (philosopher) (1867–1963), French philosopher
- Charles-André-Toussaint-Bruno de Ramond-Lalande (1761-1830), Roman Catholic bishop
- François Lalande (1930–2020), French actor
- Hec Lalande (1934–2010), Canadian ice hockey player
- Hyacinthe Marie de Lalande de Calan (1802–1850), Governor General of French India
- Henriette Méric-Lalande (1798–1867), French operatic soprano
- Jean de Lalande (died 1646), Jesuit missionary
- Jérôme Lalande (1732–1807), French astronomer and writer
- Julien Pierre Anne Lalande (1787–1844), French admiral
- Louis Lalande (active from 2011), Canadian television executive
- Kevin Lalande (born 1987), Canadian-Belarusian ice hockey goaltender
- Marie-Jeanne de Lalande (1760–1832), French astronomer
- Michel Lefrançois de Lalande (1766–1839), French astronomer
- Michel-Richard Delalande (1657–1726), French composer
- Patrice Martin-Lalande (born 1947), French politician
- Tommy Lalande (1904–1983), South African long-distance runner

== Places in France ==
- Lalande, Yonne, a commune
- Lalande-de-Pomerol, a commune in the Gironde department
  - Lalande-de-Pomerol AOC, for wine
- Lalande-en-Son, a commune in the Oise department

== Other uses ==
- 9136 Lalande, a minor planet
- De Lalande (crater), on Venus
- French cruiser Lalande, launched 1889
- Hôtel de Lalande, a townhouse in Bordeaux, France, now a museum
- Lalande (crater), a lunar crater
- Histoire céleste française, Lalande catalog of stars
- Lalande 1299, a star
- Lalande 21185, a star
- Lalande 25372, a star
- Lalande Prize, a former French award for astronomy

== See also ==
- Château de Lalande (disambiguation)
- De Lalande (disambiguation)
- Edison–Lalande cell, an alkaline battery
