= Lalonde =

Lalonde or LaLonde (US spelling) is a surname. Notable people with the surname include:

- Amy Lalonde (born 1975), Canadian television personality
- Bob LaLonde (1922–2015), American politician
- Brice Lalonde (born 1946), French politician
- Catherine Lalonde (born 1974), Canadian poet and journalist
- Daniel Lalonde (born 1963), Canadian businessman, CEO of brands in France
- Derek Lalonde (born 1972), National Hockey League head coach
- Donny Lalonde (born 1960), Canadian boxer
- Francine Lalonde (1940–2014), Canadian politician, MP for La Pointe-de-l'Île
- François Lalonde (born 1955), Canadian mathematician
- Gisèle Lalonde (1933–2022), Canadian politician, mayor of Vanier from 1985 to 1991
- Jean-Marc Lalonde (born 1935), Canadian politician, member of Legislative Assembly of Ontario
- Jeremy Lalonde (born 1981), Canadian filmmaker
- Larry LaLonde (born 1968), guitarist for rock group Primus
- Marc Lalonde (1929–2023), Canadian politician, author of the Lalonde report
- Marie-France Lalonde (born 1971), Canadian politician, former member of Legislative Assembly of Ontario, MP for Orleans
- Michèle Lalonde (1937–2021), French Canadian writer
- Newsy Lalonde (1887–1970), Canadian ice hockey player
- Pierre Lalonde (1941–2016), Canadian singer and television host
- Raymond "Lala" Lalonde (1940–2022), American politician and educator
- Robert Lalonde (born 1947), Canadian actor and writer
- Robert LaLonde (economist) (1958–2018), American economist
- Ron Lalonde (born 1952), Canadian ice hockey player
- Rose and Roxy Lalonde, fictional characters in the webcomic Homestuck
- Shawn Lalonde (born 1990), Canadian ice hockey player

== Origin of the name ==
It means literally "from a place called La Londe". There are more or less 100 places called La Londe in Normandy, France, including the commune La Londe in the Seine-Maritime department. In Old Norman(-French) it meant "grove, wood", itself from Old Norse lundr (accusative lund) "grove" + French feminine definite article la.

Variant forms include Delalonde, Delalondre.

The French surnames Delalande, Lalande (Gasconic Lalanne) are unrelated to it, but from one of the numerous French place-names called La Lande, lande being a French word that means "moor", itself from Gaulish (Celtic) *landa.

== See also ==
- Lalonde report, 1974 report on the health of Canadians
- La Londe
