= Lepaute =

Lepaute may refer to:

- Jean-André Lepaute (1720-1789), French clockmaker
- Jean-Baptiste Lepaute (1727-1802), French clockmaker
- Nicole-Reine Lepaute or Hortense Lepaute (1723-1788) French astronomer
- Lepaute (crater)
