= Joseph Lepaute Dagelet =

French astronomer and explorer

Joseph Lepaute Dagelet (1751–1788) was a French astronomer, clockmaker and mathematician who accompanied Lapérouse on his scientific circumnavigation, in the course of which he perished in the final shipwreck of the expedition. Dagelet's astronomical sightings gave precision to the maps posthumously published in the official Atlas du Voyage de la Perouse (Paris: L'Imprimerie de la Republique, An V, 1797).

Young Dagelet arrived in Paris in 1767, welcomed by his uncles the renowned clockmakers Jean-André and Jean-Baptiste Lepaute, who held the brevet horlogers du Roi. Through his aunt, Nicole-Reine Lepaute, wife of Jean-André, he discovered his aptitude for astronomy. From his arrival until 1772 he studied in the observatory of the Collège Mazarin, where he was guided by Joseph Jérôme Lefrançois de Lalande.

In 1773 he departed for the South Seas with the expedition of Yves Joseph de Kerguelen de Trémarec; on his return he was made professor of mathematics at the École Militaire, Paris.

Dagelet is known particularly for having calculated the distance between the center of Mercury and the Sun and for his map of the solar eclipse of 1778. Dagelet discovered WY Sagittae, a nova in Sagitta (27-29 July 1783) and was a scientific observer of the balloon ascent of Jacques Alexandre César Charles from the Champ de Mars, Paris, 27 August 1783.

He presented his observations of the planets and stars to the Académie des sciences and was received as adjoint and then named astronomer to the Academy in 1785, the year he embarked at Brest on the fatal expedition.

After extensively mapping and recording the coastlines of North America, Japan, Korea and Siberia, Lapérouse was directed by the French government to go to Botany Bay to observe the founding of the British Colony by the First Fleet. On 26 January 1788 Lapérouse arrived at Botany Bay, just as the British were leaving for Port Jackson. The French ships stayed at Botany Bay for six weeks and built a stockade, observatory and a garden for fresh produce on the La Perouse peninsula. At Botany Bay Dagelet undertook calculations on map position of Botany Bay, carried out astronomical observations and met with William Dawes at Port Jackson. Dawes volunteered for service with the First Fleet and sailed on the Sirius. From February 1788, he was employed on shore to build an observatory at Dawes Point. Following this meeting Dagelet sent a letter to Dawes (1762-1836) with advice to Dawes on setting up his observatory, recent work on the fluctuations of the Earth's magnetic field and calculations on maps positions of Botany Bay.

The island of Dagelet, named in his honour, is now known by its Korean name, Ulleungdo. In Alaska, Mount Dagelet still bears his name.
