= Rocles, Allier =

Rocles
- Commune
- Location of Rocles
- Location within France Location within Auvergne-Rhône-Alpes
- Coordinates: 46°25′28″N 3°01′55″E
- Country: France
- Region: Auvergne-Rhône-Alpes
- Department: Allier
- Arrondissement: Moulins
- Canton: Souvigny
- Intercommunality: Bocage Bourbonnais

Government
  - Mayor (2026–32): Sébastien Arnaud
- Area^{1}: 21.66 km^{2} (8.36 sq mi)
- Elevation: 392 m (1,286 ft)
- Highest elevation: 460 m (1,510 ft)
- Lowest elevation: 355 m (1,165 ft)
- Population (2023): 326
  - Density: 15.1/km^{2} (39.0/sq mi)
- Time zone: UTC+01:00 (CET)
  - Summer (DST): UTC+02:00 (CEST)
- INSEE/Postal code: 03214 /03240
- ^{1} French Land Register data, which excludes lakes, ponds, glaciers > 1 km^{2} (0.386 sq mi or 247 acres) and river estuaries.

Rocles (French pronunciation: [ʁɔkl]; Occitan: Ròcles) is a commune in the Allier department in Auvergne in central France.

== Population ==
Historical population
Year	Pop.	±% p.a.
1968	363	—
1975	382	+0.73%
1982	419	+1.33%
1990	367	−1.64%
1999	373	+0.18%
2007	356	−0.58%
2012	402	+2.46%
2017	380	−1.12%
2023	326	−2.52%
Source: INSEE

== Sights ==
- Château de la Lande, 15th century
- Etang du Lion, a pond which belonged in the past to the Castle of Montbillon in Saint-Sornin

== See also ==
- Bourbonnais
- Communes of the Allier department
