= Château Tournefeuille =

Wine estate in Lalande-de-Pomerol, Gironde, France

Château Tournefeuille is a wine estate in Lalande-de-Pomerol, an appellation in Bordeaux near Pomerol and St. Emilion.

== Location ==
Château Tournefeuille is located in the village of Néac in the commune of Lalande-de-Pomerol, approximately 7 km from the town of St. Emilion and 7 km from the town of Libourne. The château and chai are situated on a hill atop the valley of the Barbanne, a small river that separates Lalande-de-Pomerol from the more famous wine-producing appellation of Pomerol. Just on the other side of the Barbanne from Tournefeuille lies Château Pétrus, one of Bordeaux's best-known wine estates. The vineyard of Tournefeuille encompasses 18 hectares.

== History ==
Wine has been produced from Tournefeuille's vineyards for over two hundred years. The presence of the vineyard is indicated on the 1785 Beyleme map. Tournefeuille was owned and run by the Sautarel family for several decades. In 1998, Tournefeuille was purchased by the childhood friends François Petit and Francis Cambier and their respective families. François Petit's son Emeric runs the chateau day-to-day. The Petit and Cambier families have made significant investments to improve the wine, including the introduction of more natural viticultural techniques and a more stringent selection of grapes. La Revue du Vin de France noted that the property is “in good hands” with the new owners and that “their efforts have started to bear fruit… the first vintages of the new century are of a quality that bears no resemblance whatsoever to what was produced there until recently.”

== Terroir and winemaking ==
Tournefeuille's vineyard is defined by its southwestern-facing slope. The soil on the slope features a high clay content while the plots at top of the hill are more gravelly, a terroir typical of the Pomerol appellation. The vines, the majority of which are more than 30 years old, are split between the slope and the hilltop. The wine is composed of 70% merlot and 30% cabernet franc. Vinification is performed in a concrete thermo-regulated fermenting room. The wine is then aged for 12 months in French oak barrels. All bottling occurs at the château. Tournefeuille offers a second wine, Rosalcy, which is produced from five hectares adjacent to Tournefeuille and is composed of 55% merlot and 45% cabernet franc.

== Reviews and awards ==
Château Tournefeuille has garnered significant attention in the press in the last several years as the winemakers' investments in the château have begun to pay off. In a May 2007 article on affordable wines from Bordeaux, The Wall Street Journal called the 2004 Château Tournefeuille "Soft and velvety, bursting with ripe fruit and balancing acidity, with a mineral undertone – especially after it's open a while – that adds complexity. Fetching. Drink now".

Esteemed British wine critic Jancis Robinson wrote of the 2007 vintage: "Toasty, slightly charred oak spice over cassis. Plenty of grip but not hard. Fresh finish."

A September 2005 article in Le Figaro Magazine entitled “The Beautiful Future of Lalande de Pomerol” said of the 2004: "Château Tournefeuille possesses freshness and finesse which lingers over its beautiful long finish. This is a wine that will mature well."

The 2005 Tournefeuille won a gold medal at the Concours Mondial des Vins de Bordeaux in 2008. The 2006 Tournefeuille received a silver medal at the Concours des Vins des Vignerons Independants in 2008.
