= Château de Lalande =

Château de Lalande or Château de la Lande may refer to:

- Château de Lalande (Indre)
- Château de la Lande de Niafles, a château in Mayenne, Pays-de-la-Loire
- Château de la Lande (Rocles), Allier
- Château de la Lande (Montmorillon), Vienne
- Château de la Lande (Vallon-en-Sully), Allier
- Château de Lalande (Yonne)

== See also ==
- Château Pichon Longueville Comtesse de Lalande, a winery
- Château de Lalinde, a château in Lalinde, Dordogne, France
- Lalande (disambiguation)
