= Château de Montbillon =

Coordinates: 46°25′14″N 3°0′43″E

The Château de Montbillon is a château in Saint-Sornin in the Allier department in the Auvergne region of France.

== History ==
The château is a building of the 17th and 19th centuries, with a chapel and bell tower, and an ancient dovecote. The domaine de Montbillon (the lands, now a large farm, of which the château was the centre) also included the Étang du lion ("Lion's Pond") now in the commune of Rocles. The Thonier family built some parts of the château and owned it for many years.
