= Louise du Pierry =

French astronomer and professor (1746–1807)

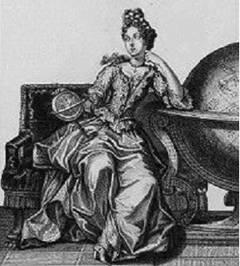
- Born: Elisabeth Louise Felicité Pourra de la Madeleine; 30 July/1 August 1746; Maine, France
- Died: 27 February 1807; Luzarches, Val-d'Oise, France
- Known for: First female professor at the Sorbonne (1789)
- Scientific career
- Fields: Astronomy, natural history
- Workplaces: Sorbonne, Académie des Sciences de Béziers
- Academic advisors: Jérôme de Lalande

Louise du Pierry or Dupiery, (née Elisabeth Louise Felicité Pourra de la Madeleine) (30 July/1 August 1746 - 27 February 1807) was a French astronomer and mathematician. In 1789, she became the Sorbonne's first female professor. She is also remembered for her contributions to positional astronomy, predicting eclipses and calculating tobles of the length of days and nights.

Jerome de Lalande dedicated his work, Astronomie des Dames (1790) to her as "the most educated woman I have known". In this work, he lauds her talent, taste, and courage in the field of science, describing her as "a model for all women because of her high intellectual qualities."

== Early life and education ==
Elisabeth Louise Felicité Pourra de la Madeleine was born in La Ferté-Bernard, in the French province of Maine, on 30 July or 1 August 1746.

After her husband died in 1789, Louise du Pierry became a student of, and the mistress of, astronomer Jérôme de Lalande, whom she met in 1779. She studied both natural history and astronomy.

She established a close relationship with Lalande, who addressed her as "my dear Lala" and later as "astronomette" or "Pantomaté", In 1790, he commented in his "Astronomie des Dames": "She is a role model for all women because of her high intellectual qualities."

== Career ==
In 1779, du Pierry met Jérôme de Lalande, who instructed her in astronomy. She quickly became his scientific assistant, helping him and his male colleagues with calculations of ephemerides. In 1788 she became a member of the Beziers Science Academy (Académie des Sciences de Véziers], succeeding the astronomer Nicole-Reine Lepaute, who also worked with Jérôme de Lalande. She was also associated with the Montauban Academy and with the Richmond Academy in the United States.

In 1782, she published "Explication des tables de la durée du jour et de la nuit" (Explanation of the tables of the duration of day and night), which the following year was included in Lalande's "Ephémérides des mouvements célestes".

In 1789, she became the first female professor at the Sorbonne University in Paris as the leader of the Cours d’astronomie ouvert pour les dames et mis à leur portée for female students. It was the first class geared towards women taught primarily at her home. The course was a huge success, despite many students initially fearing the subject matter would be too difficult for women. It is the only course in 18th-century France which was specifically designed for women.

Between 1800 and 1801, together with Antoine-François Fourcroy, she co-edited "La Table alphabétique et analytique du système des connaissances chimiques" (The Alphabetical and Analytical Table of the System of Chemical Knowledge) which was published in 1891.

In addition to her scientific work, du Piery also studied and made drawings of insects and plants,

Louise du Pierry died in Luzarches, Val-d'Oise, France on February 27, 1807.

== Research ==
She studied eclipses, calculated the length of day and night at the latitude of Béziers, and compiled tables of refraction based on right ascension and declination. Du Pierry published many works involving the collection of astronomical data over the course of her career. She also published an analytical table of chemical substances. These works include:

- Tables de l’effet des réfractions, en ascension droite et en déclinaison, pour la latitude de Paris, Paris, 1791. This publication concerned the estimation of the refraction effect, knowledge of which was necessary for the calculations of astronomers. The series of tables provide the amount of the refraction effect as a function of the right ascension and declination at the latitude of Paris.
- Tables de la durée du jour et de la nuit, Paris, 1792. This publication provided the duration of the days and the nights for both astronomical and civil uses.
- Calculs d’éclipses pour mieux trouver le movement de la Lune.
- Table alphabétique et analytique des matières continues dans le cinq tomes du Système des connaissances chimiques de Fourcroy, Paris, Beaudouin, 1799 (year X of the French revolution).

== Honours ==
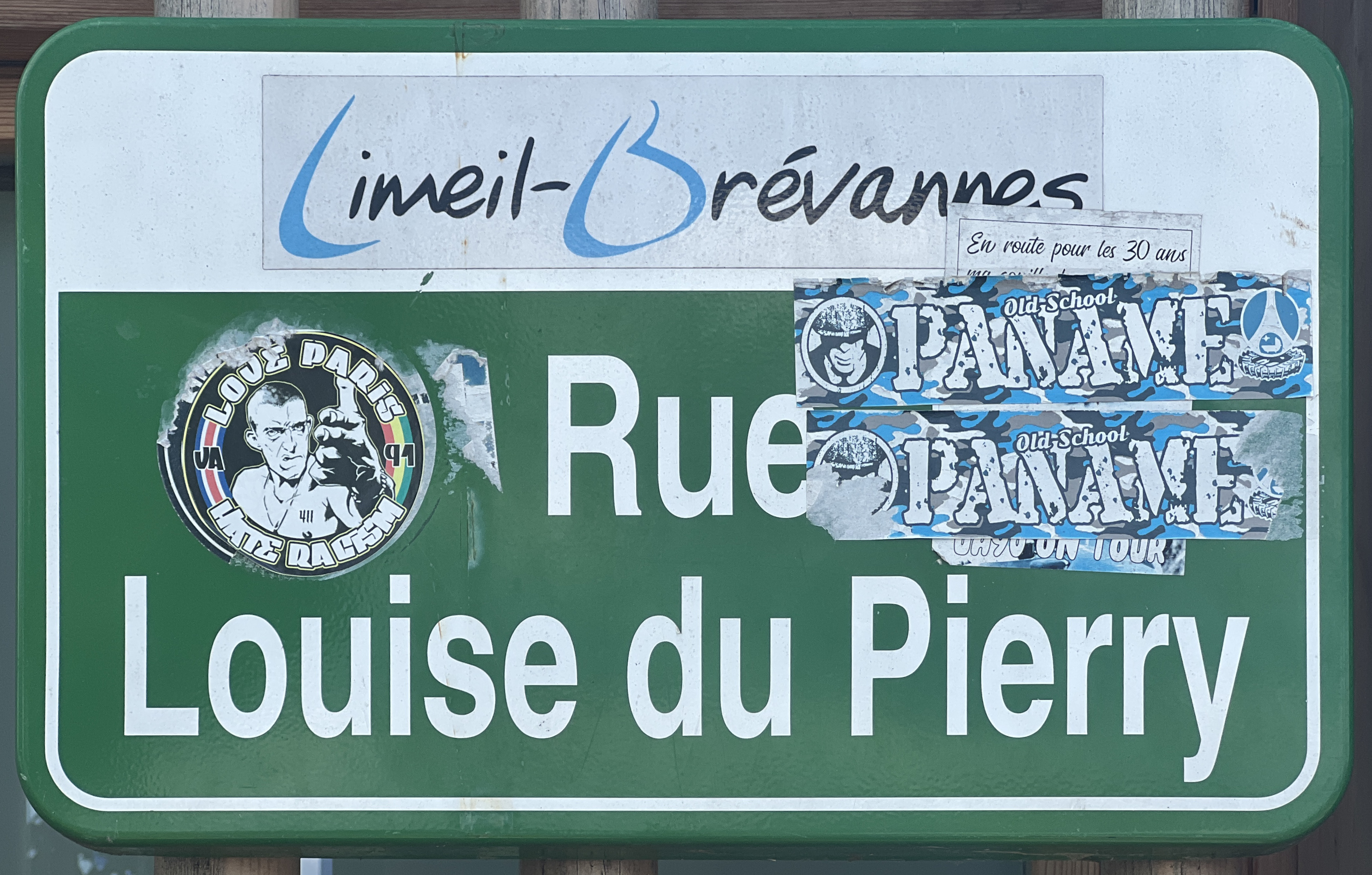
Street sign with Rue Louise Pierry's name

A street in Limeil-Brévannes was named in her honor.

In 2026, du Pierry was announced as one of 72 historical women in STEM whose names have been proposed to be added to the 72 men already celebrated on the Eiffel Tower. The plan was announced by the Mayor of Paris, Anne Hidalgo following the recommendations of a committee led by Isabelle Vauglin of Femmes et Sciences and Jean-François Martins, representing the operating company which runs the Eiffel Tower.

== See also ==
- Nicole-Reine Lepaute
- Marie-Jeanne de Lalande
- Timeline of women in science
