= Lalande-de-Pomerol AOC =

Lalande-de-Pomerol (French pronunciation: [lalɑ̃d də pɔmʁɔl]) is an Appellation d'Origine Contrôlée (AOC) for red wine situated in the Bordeaux wine region. The appellation is located on the right bank of the Garonne and Dordogne rivers. Born in 1936, the Lalande de Pomerol appellation is located just north of the appellation of Pomerol, across the meandering Barbanne stream.

The two main villages of the appellation are Lalande-de-Pomerol and Néac.

== Terroir ==
The terroir of Lalande-de-Pomerol is quite varied. The estates of Néac feature clay and gravelly soil more commonly seen in neighboring Pomerol, while the estates of Lalande lie on sandier soil.

== Winemaking ==
The wines of Lalande-de-Pomerol are made predominantly of Merlot, but may also contain Cabernet Franc, Cabernet Sauvignon, and Malbec.

The 1990s and 2000s saw a number of new owners of wine estates in Lalande-de-Pomerol, many of whom have made significant investments in the properties that have improved the quality.

== Wine estates ==
- Château Tournefeuille
- CHATEAU BOUJUT
- Chateau Vieux Chevrol

== See also ==
- Bordeaux wine regions
- French wine
- History of Bordeaux wine
