= WY Sagittae =

1783 Nova seen in the constellation Sagitta

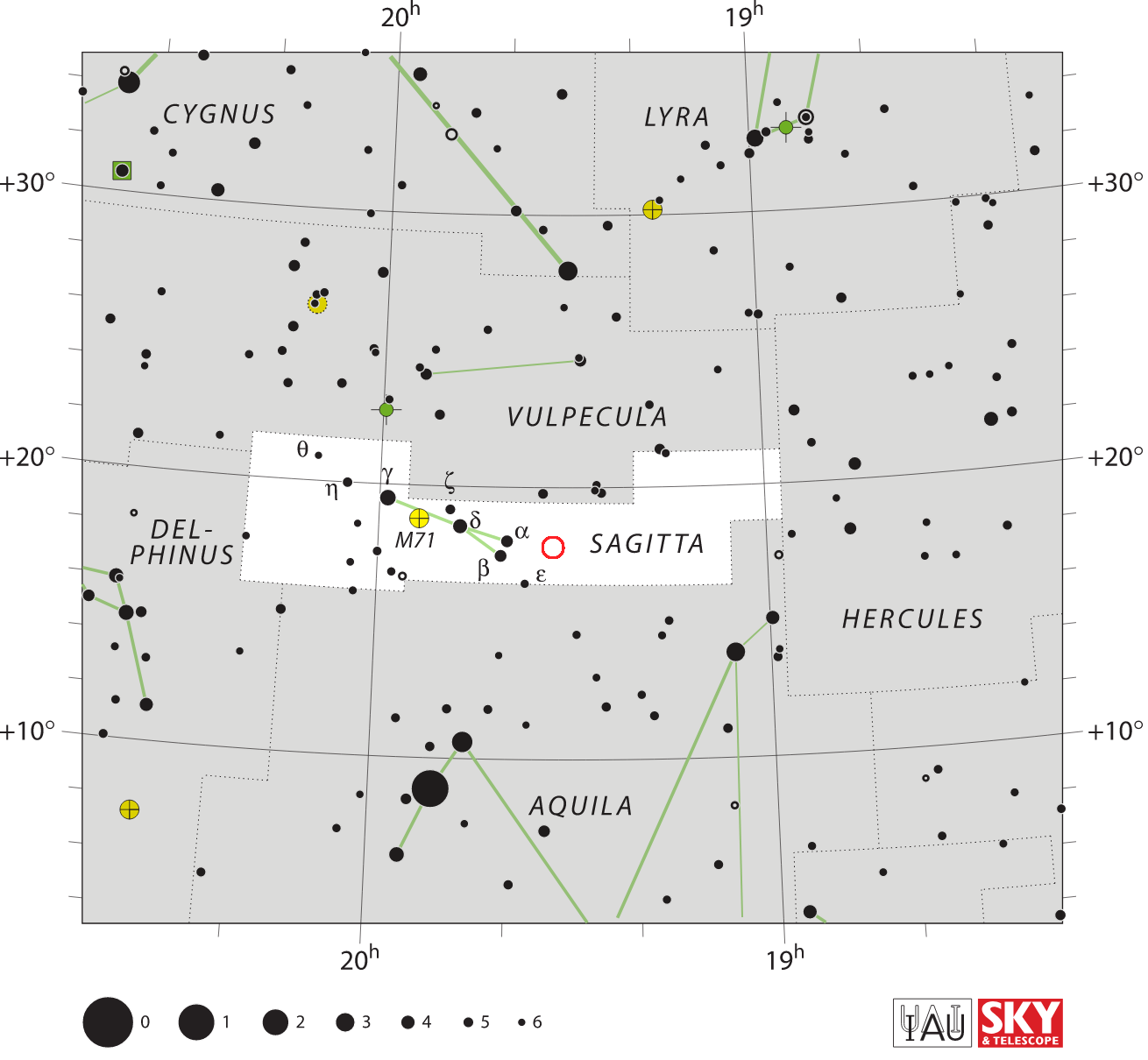
- Location of WY Sagittae (circled in red)

Observation data Epoch J2000.0 Equinox J2000.0
- Constellation: Sagitta
- Right ascension: 19^{h} 32^{m} 43.819^{s}
- Declination: 17° 44′ 55.86″
- Apparent magnitude (V): 5.4 - 20.7 (Blue)

Astrometry
Distance	4200+400 −400 pc

Characteristics
- Variable type: Nova, Eclipsing binary

Other designations
- WY Sge, Nova Sagittae 1783

Database references
SIMBAD	data

WY Sagittae, also known as Nova Sagittae 1783, is a star in the constellation Sagitta which had a nova eruption visible in 1783. It was discovered on 26 July 1783 by the French astronomer Joseph Lepaute D'Agelet. It is usually difficult to precisely identify novae that were discovered hundreds of years ago, because the positions were often vaguely reported (for example the discoverer may have only reported the constellation where the nova occurred) and historically there was not a clear distinction drawn between different sorts of transient astronomical events such as novae and comet apparitions. However D'Agelet observed this nova with a mural quadrant, which produced coordinates accurate enough to allow modern astronomers to identify the star. D'Agelet reported the apparent magnitude of the star as 6, but Benjamin Apthorp Gould, who analysed D'Agelet's records, determined that what D'Agelet called magnitude 6 corresponds to magnitude 5.4 ± 0.4 on the modern magnitude scale, so the nova was visible to the naked eye.

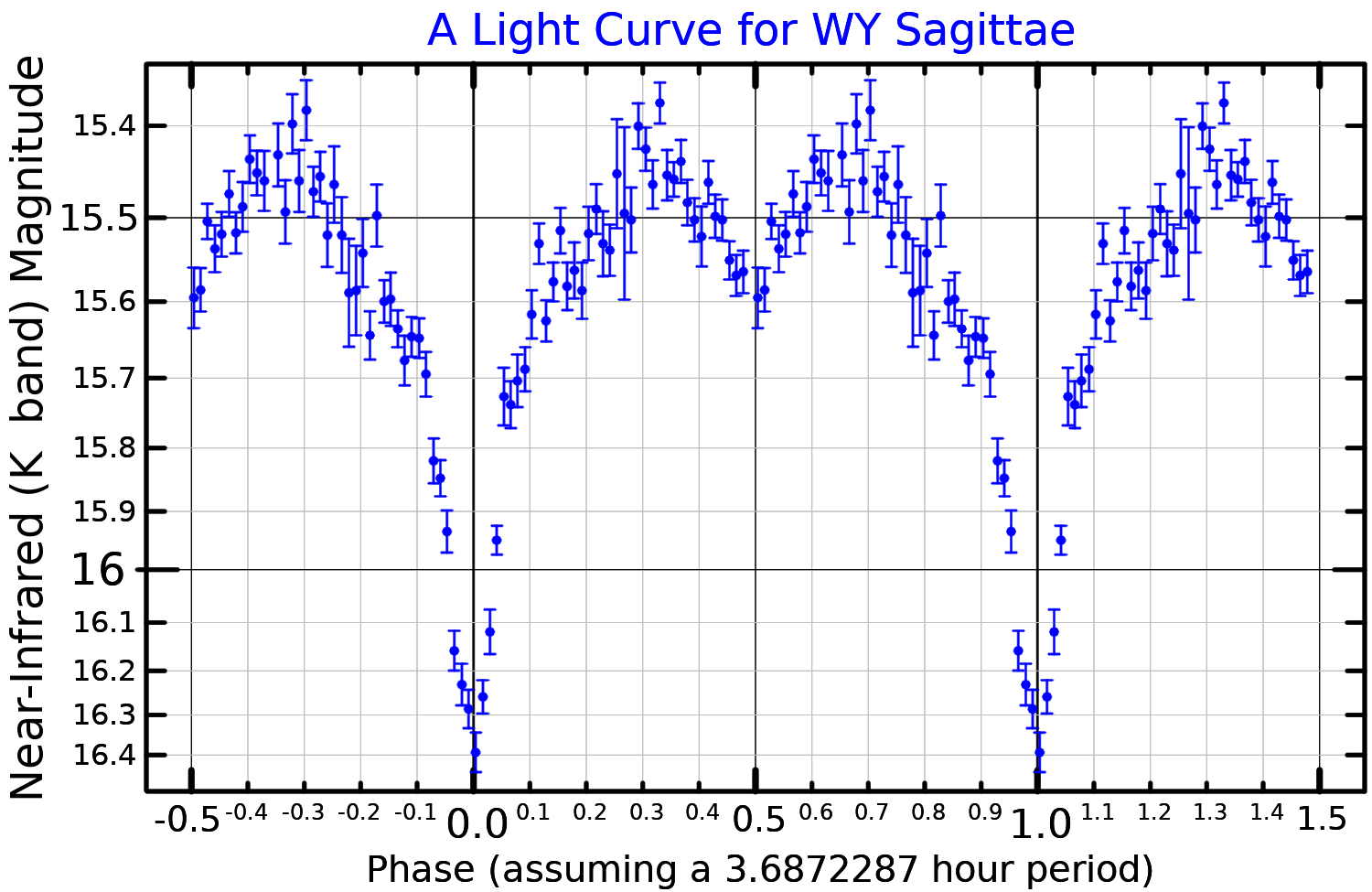
A near-infrared (K band) light curve for WY Sagittae, adapted from Somers et al. (1996). The ordinate is linear in flux.

Very little is known about WY Sagittae's post-eruption light curve. D'Agelet reported the star's magnitude as 6, 6 and 6.7 on the 26th, 27th and 29 July 1783, respectively. At least a half dozen observers attempted to find D'Agelet's nova in the late 19th and early 20th centuries, without success. In 1942 a photographic search for the nova was performed using the 60-inch telescope on Mt. Wilson, and in 1950 Harold Weaver tentatively identified a faint blue star with a photographic magnitude of 18.9 as the quiescent nova. The star was only a few arc seconds away from D'Agelet's reported position, and fluctuations in its brightness added to the confidence that it was indeed the nova. In 1971 Brian Warner observed Weaver's candidate for WY Sagittae with the Otto Struve Telescope, and saw rapid brightness variations that are ubiquitous in quiescent novae, which confirmed Weaver's identification of D'Agelet's nova.

All novae are binary stars, with a "donor" star orbiting a white dwarf. The two stars are so close together that matter is transferred from the donor star to the white dwarf. Because the distance between the stars is comparable to the radius of the donor star, novae are often eclipsing binaries, and WY Sagittae does show eclipses. The eclipses, which are quite deep (two magnitudes), show that the binary's orbital period is 3 hours and 41 minutes. Christian Knigge classified the donor star's spectral type as M4±1. Somers et al. estimate the donor star's spectral type to be between M3.5 and M4.5, and the mass of the white dwarf to lie between 0.5 M_{☉} and 1.1 M_{☉}.

Özdönmez et al. estimate WY Sagittae's distance to be 4200±400 parsecs, based on reddening.

WY Sagittae is sometimes listed as the second oldest "recovered" nova (meaning a historical nova for which modern observations have unambiguously identified the post-nova star), with only CK Vulpeculae being older. But Naylor et al. argue that CK Vulpeculae is not a nova, and WY Sagittae is the oldest recovered nova.
