= De Lalande (crater) =

Crater on Venus

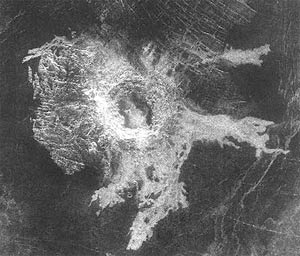
- Radar image of de Lalande by Magellan probe.
- Location: Venus
- Coordinates: 20.5°N 355.0°E
- Diameter: 21 km
- Eponym: Marie-Jeanne de Lalande

De Lalande (commonly lowercased as de Lalande) is a multiring impact crater on the surface of Venus. It has a diameter of 21.6 km (13.4 mi) and wall width of 5.6 km (3.5 mi). The crater has an outer rim but no peak and is in close proximity to the volcano Gula Mons.

== Namesake ==
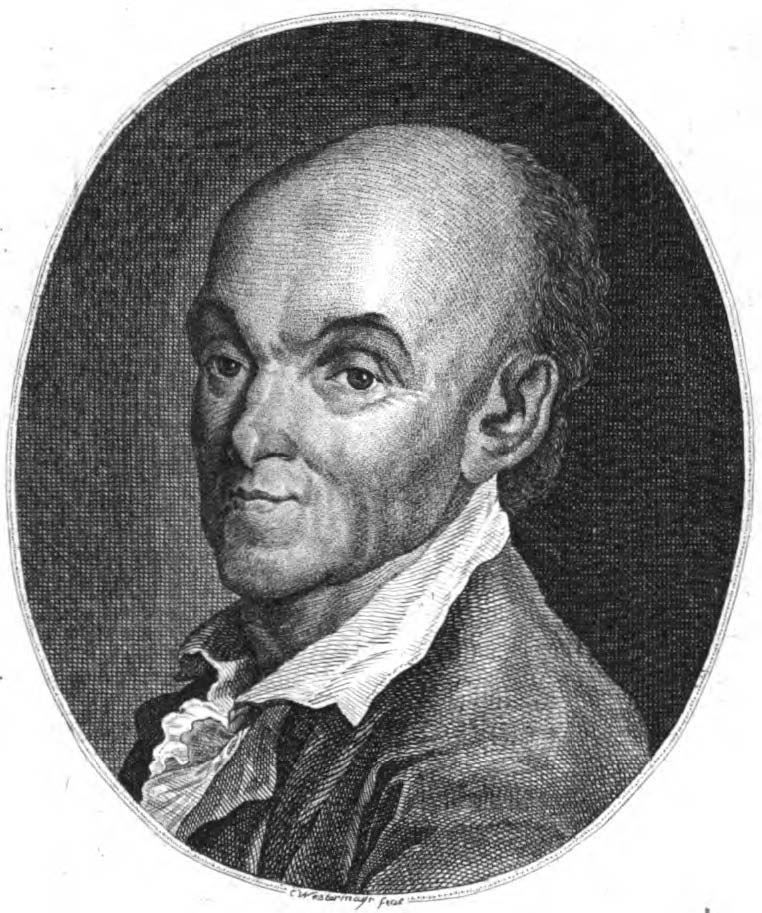
French astronomer Jérôme Lalande

The de Lalande crater is named after the French astronomer Marie-Jeanne de Lalande (1768–1832), illegitimate daughter of astronomer Joseph Jerome de Lalande (1732–1807).
