= Marie-Jeanne de Lalande =

French astronomer and mathematician (1768–1832)

Marie-Jeanne Amélie Lefrançois de Lalande
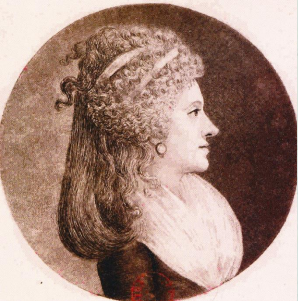
- Portrait
- Born: Marie-Jeanne Harlay; 1768; Paris, France
- Died: November 8, 1832 (aged 63–64); Paris, France
- Spouse: Michel Lefrançois de Lalande (m. 1788)
- Scientific career
- Fields: Astronomy

Marie-Jeanne Amélie Lefrançois de Lalande (née Harlay; 1768 – 8 November 1832) was a French astronomer. She was a key collaborator to the works of Jérôme Lalande.

Her reputation as a scientific woman was attested by an anecdote related to Carl Friedrich Gauss: In 1806, during a military campaign in Prussia, he declared he knew but one French woman that worked in science, Madame Lefrançois de Lalande.

== Biography ==
Marie-Jeanne Harlay was born in Paris in 1768, daughter of school teachers Jean François Harlay (born 1730) and Anne Elisabeth Cany (born 1744). Some early authors considered her the illegitimate daughter of Jérôme Lalande.

Jérome Lalande taught Marie-Jeanne Harlay astronomy. Jérôme Lalande was said to have valued Harlay for her mathematical disposition. Michel Lefrançois de Lalande, nephew of Jérôme Lalande, also learned astronomy with his uncle and married Marie-Jeanne in 1788. Jérome Lalande referred to Michel Lefrançois and Marie-Jeanne de Lalande as his nephew and niece.

Michel Lefrançois succeeded Lalande at the École militaire and carried out a large star survey with the help of his wife, but she was not listed among the authors.

Marie-Jeanne and Michel Lefrançois de Lalande had four children. Their son Isaac Lefrançais de Lalande was named after Isaac Newton. Their second child, Caroline was named after Caroline Herschel, her birth date, 20 January 1790 being the first day a Comet discovered by Herschel was visible from Paris. Caroline died as an infant. Their third child Charlotte Uranie Lefrançais de Lalande was the goddaughter the astronomer Jean Baptiste Joseph Delambre and Charlotte of Saxe-Meiningen. Their fourth child was named Charles Auguste Frédéric Jérôme Lefrançais de Lalande.

De Lalande lectured in astronomy in Paris. During the French Revolution, the chief of the Paris Observatory, Dominique, comte de Cassini, asked Marie-Jeanne for help. She taught Cassini's son and helped him make his first observations at the Collège de France.

De Lalande and the Duchess Charlotte of Saxe-Meiningen were the only female astronomers that participated at the First European congress of astronomers in 1798. During the trip, the Duchess added the name Amélie to de Lalande's name.

She died in Paris in 1832.

== Works ==
She calculated the Tables horaires de marine, which was published in Jerome Lalande's Abrégé de navigation historique théorique et pratique avec tables horaires (1793). These calculations earned Jérôme Lalande one of the medals of the Lycée des Arts for distinguished scholars and artists. Jérôme Lalande dedicated the award to Marie-Jeanne de Lalande.

Her work was also published in Jérôme Lalande's annual almanac Connaissance des temps from 1794 to 1806.

In 1785, in the preface to Astronomie des dames by Jérôme Lalande, he cites Marie-Jeanne de Lalande as one of the greatest female astronomers along Hypatia, Maria Cunitz, Elisabeth Hevelius, Émilie du Châtelet, Nicole-Reine Lepaute, Louise du Pierry, Caroline Herschel and Charlotte of Saxe-Gotha.

In 1799, she established a catalog of 10,000 stars.

She also collaborated on the writing of L'Histoire céleste française written by Lalande and published in 1801. The work indicated the position of nearly 50,000 stars.

== Honors ==
The multi-ring impact crater de Lalande on Venus was named after her.
