= Lalanne (surname) =

Lalanne is a surname. Notable people with the name include:

- Alfredo Lalanne (born 1983), Argentine rugby player
- Cady Lalanne (born 1992), Haitian basketball player
- Carlos Lalanne (born 1906), Chilean sport shooter
- Francis Lalanne (born 1958), French-Uruguayan singer, songwriter, and poet
- Jack LaLanne (1914–2011), American fitness, exercise, nutritional expert
- Jean-Louis Lalanne (1954–2025), French footballer
- Léon Lalanne (1811–1892), French engineer and politician
- Ludovic Lalanne (1815–1898), French historian and librarian
- Maxime Lalanne (1827–1886), French etcher and drawer
- Stanislas Lalanne (born 1948), French Roman Catholic bishop
