= Château de la Lande (Rocles) =

Castle in Auvergne-Rhône-Alpes, France

Coordinates: 46°27′8″N 3°3′24″E

The Château de la Lande is a castle in the commune of Rocles in the Allier département in the Auvergne region of France.

== History ==
Early in its history it was supposedly a possession or commandery of the Knights Templar.

The castle dates from the 15th century, with later construction in the 17th century.

Among its later owners was the de Lichy de Lichy family.

It has been listed since 2001 as a monument historique by the French Ministry of Culture.

== Description ==
The castle is typical of a series of Bourbonnais castles of the 15th century. The keep is crowned with a round walk constructed from wood. There is a moat and an older tower with defensive devices. The small chapel was designed by the architect René Moreau.
