= Lepaute (crater) =

Crater on the Moon

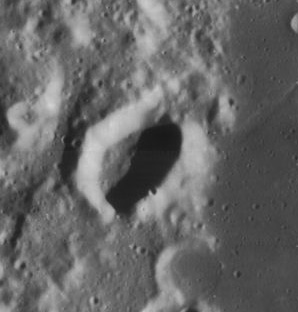
- Lunar Orbiter 4 image
- Coordinates: 33.3°S 33.6°W
- Diameter: 16 km
- Depth: 2.1 km
- Colongitude: 34° at sunrise
- Eponym: Nicole-Reine Lepaute

Lepaute is a small lunar impact crater that is located along the western edge of the Palus Epidemiarum, a minor lunar mare in the southwestern part of the Moon's near side. To the east is the larger crater Ramsden, within a system of rilles named the Rimae Ramsden. This is an elongated crater feature that is longer in the north–south direction. The outer rim is only slightly worn, and the inner walls are simple slopes that run down to the level, featureless interior floor.

This crater was named after French astronomer Nicole-Reine Lepaute.

== Lepaute E and unnamed dark V-shaped formation ==
Dark satellite crater Lepaute E, south-southwest of Lepaute itself, is surrounded by an officially unnamed dark V-shaped formation. The diameter of this dark V is 50 kilometers. It is easy to observe during and after full moon. The darkness of both Lepaute E and the V formation is also noticeable on the photographic version of chart 111 (page 222) in The Clementine Atlas of the Moon (Ben Bussey / Paul D. Spudis).

== Satellite craters ==
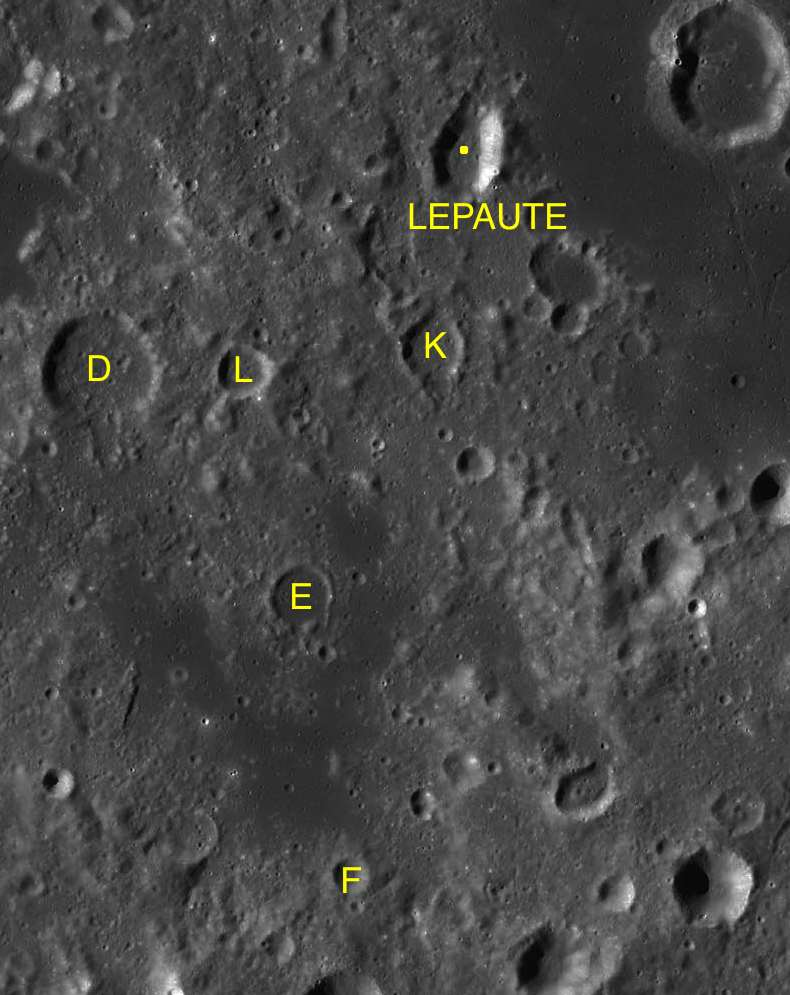
Lepaute and its satellite craters

By convention these features are identified on lunar maps by placing the letter on the side of the crater midpoint that is closest to Lepaute.

Lepaute	Latitude	Longitude	Diameter
D	34.3° S	36.2° W	22 km
E	35.7° S	35.0° W	10 km
F	37.2° S	34.8° W	7 km
K	34.3° S	33.9° W	12 km
L	34.5° S	35.2° W	9 km
