= Château de Lalinde =

Château in Nouvelle-Aquitaine, France

Coordinates: 44°50′08″N 0°44′17″E

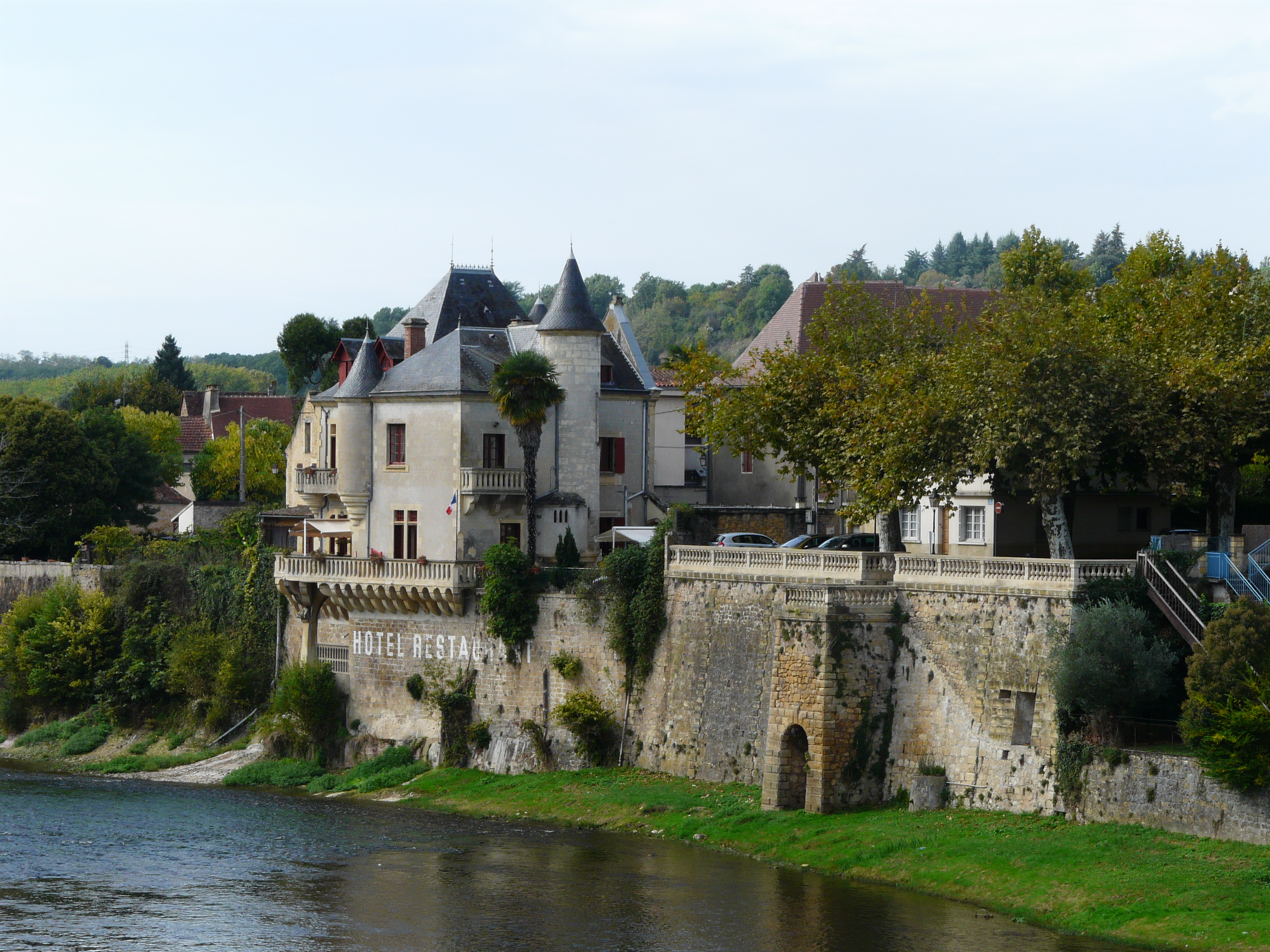
Château de Lalinde, October 2010

The Château de Lalinde is a château, developed from a 13th-century castle, in the commune of Lalinde in the Dordogne département of France. It is known locally as le château de la Bastide.

== History ==
Built in the 13th century overlooking the Dordogne River, the castle was known as Castrum de la Lynde.

During the 18th century, its keep was used as a prison.

Rebuilt during the 19th century, it was transformed into a hotel-restaurant. It is now a private residence.

== Architecture ==
Built on foundations bordered by the river, this modest château has preserved two medieval corner turrets, joining what remains of the old keep.

== See also ==
- List of castles in France
