= Jean-André Lepaute =

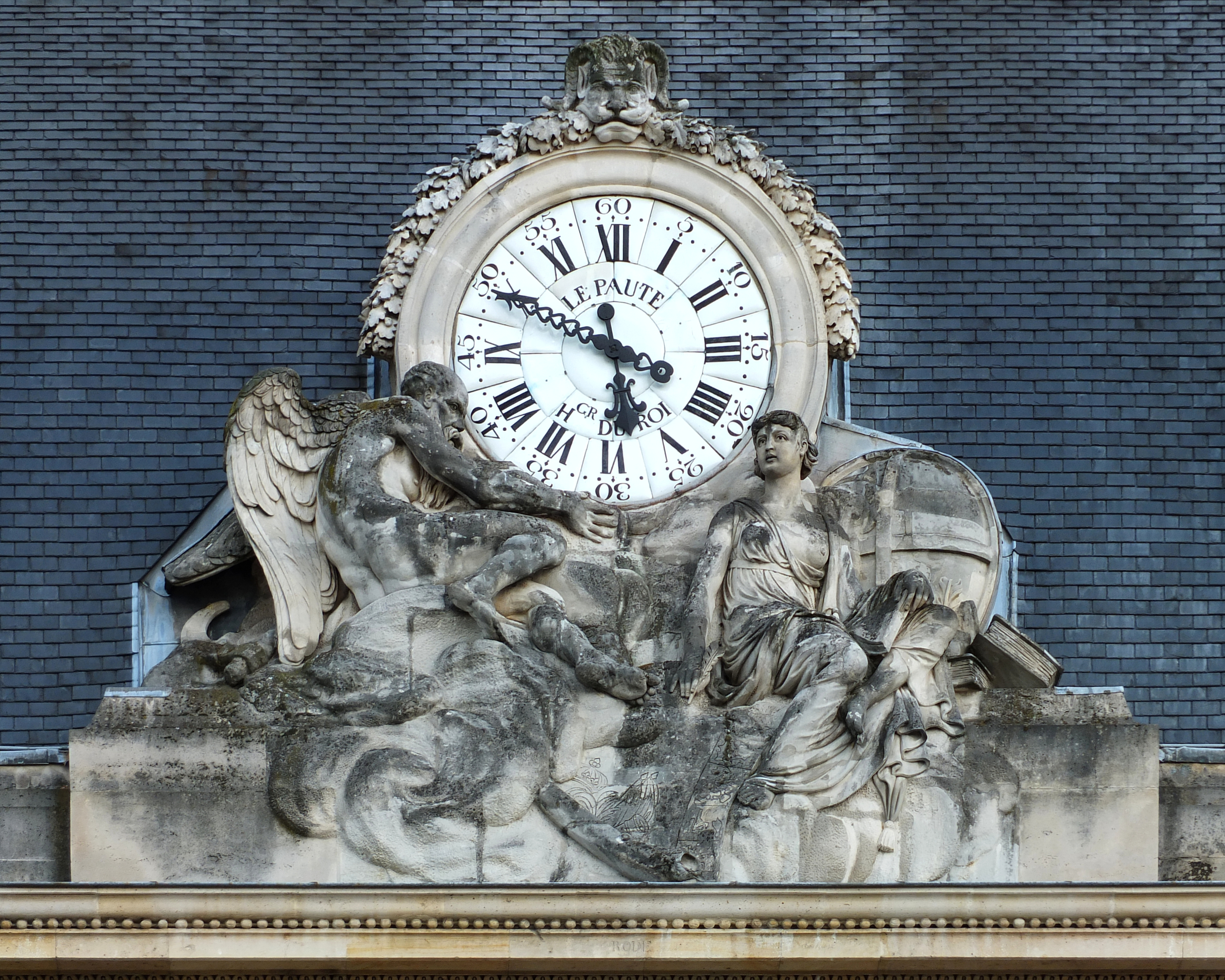
The clock at the École militaire, Paris,

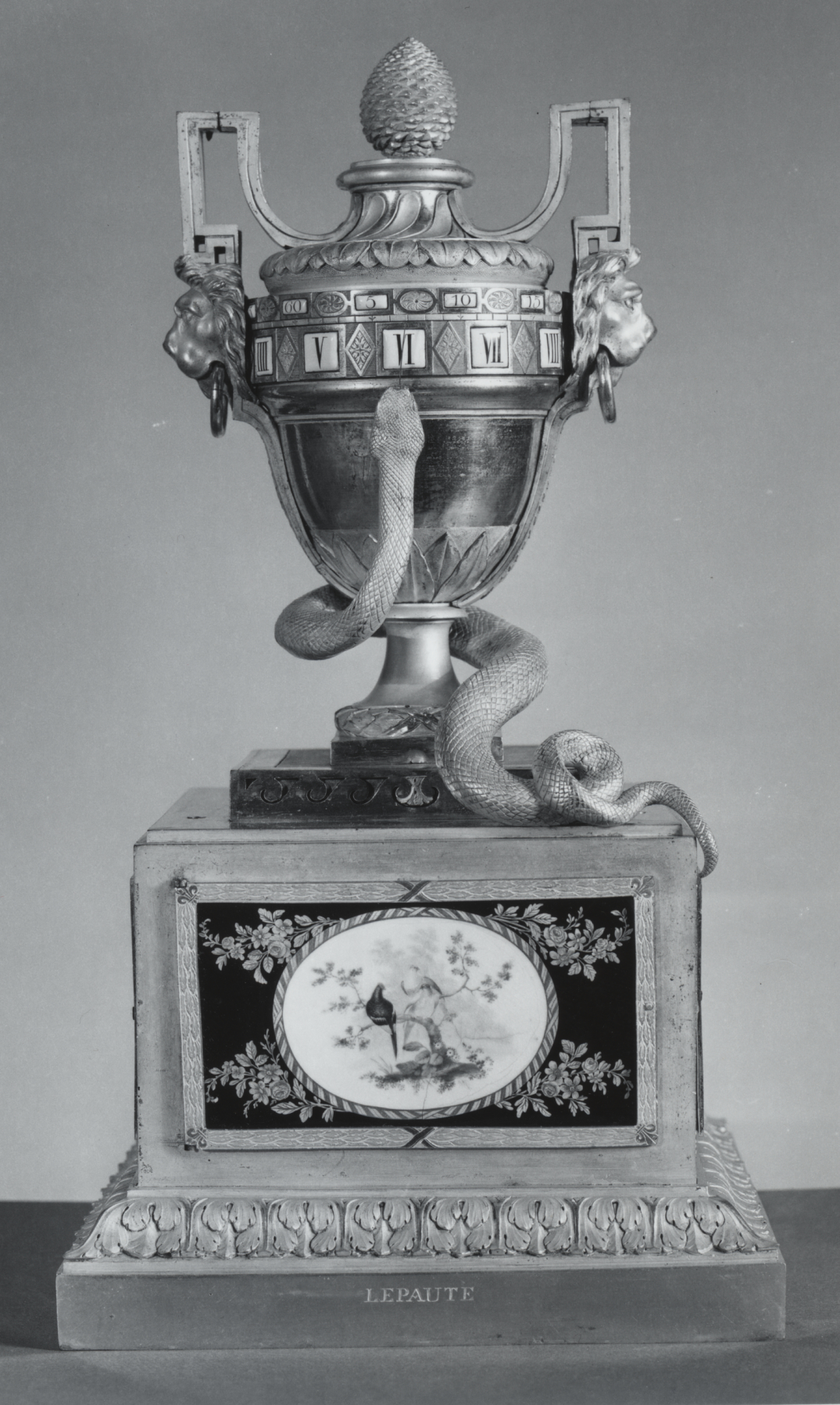
Urn clock, Walters Art Museum

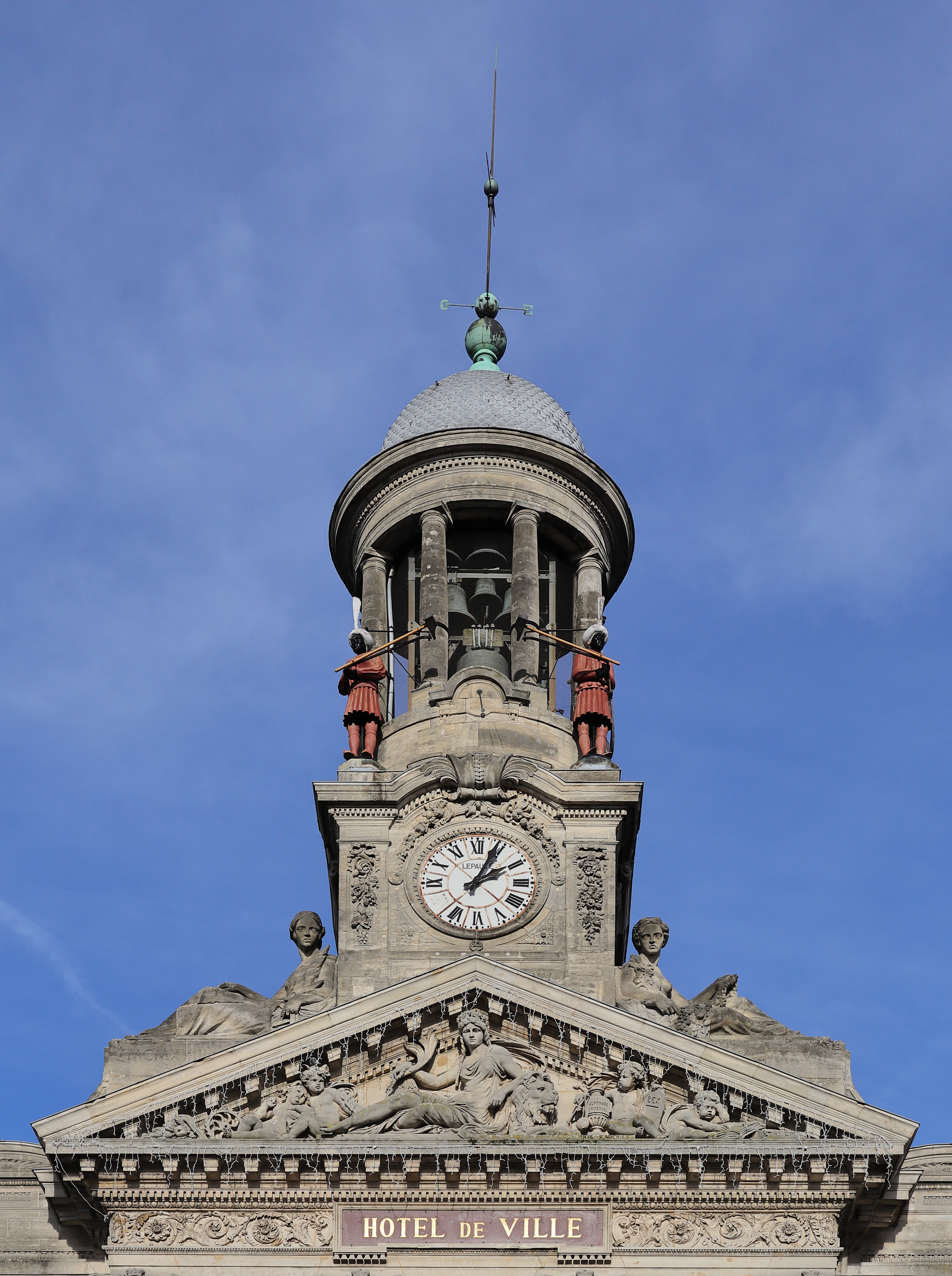
Cambrai Town Hall

Jean-André Lepaute (23 November 1720 – 11 April 1789), together with his younger brother Jean-Baptiste Lepaute (6 February 1727 – 18 March 1802), was a founder of an outstanding French clockmaker dynasty of their day, holding the brevet horlogers du Roi. His brother assumed his workshop in 1774, when Jean-André retired; he died after a long illness at Paris.

Born at Thonne-la-Long in Lorraine, Lepaute arrived in Paris as a young man. His brother joined him in 1747. Before he was received maître by the clockmakers' guild in 1759, he had made such a reputation with several public clocks, notably at the Luxembourg Palace, the château de Bellevue and the château des Ternes that he was given lodgings in the Luxembourg. His clock at the École militaire, Paris, (illustration, right) still runs.

Lepaute was an innovator, to whom numerous improvements are due, especially his pin-wheel escapement. He constructed refinements to the clockwork in which the gears are all in the horizontal plane, making possible the revolving dials of clocks in urns (illustration, right) or in globes characteristic of the classicizing Louis XVI style. Three editions of his Traité d'Horlogerie were published in Paris, in 1755, 1760 and 1767. A small volume, Description de plusieurs ouvrages d'horlogerie ("A Description of several works of clockmaking") appeared in 1764.

His wife, whom he married in 1748, was the astronomer Nicole-Reine Lepaute, who nursed him in his long last illness. His nephew was the clockmaker, mathematician and astronomer Joseph Lepaute Dagelet who accompanied Lapérouse on his fateful scientific navigation.

Jean-André retired in 1775, whereupon his brother Jean-Baptiste took over the workshop. Jean-Baptiste likewise constructed some famous public clocks, including the 1780 equation clock on the Hôtel de Ville de Paris and the clock on the Hôtel des Invalides. A nephew Pierre-Basile Lepaute (1750–1843) carried the firm well into the 19th century.
