= La Londe =

- Commune
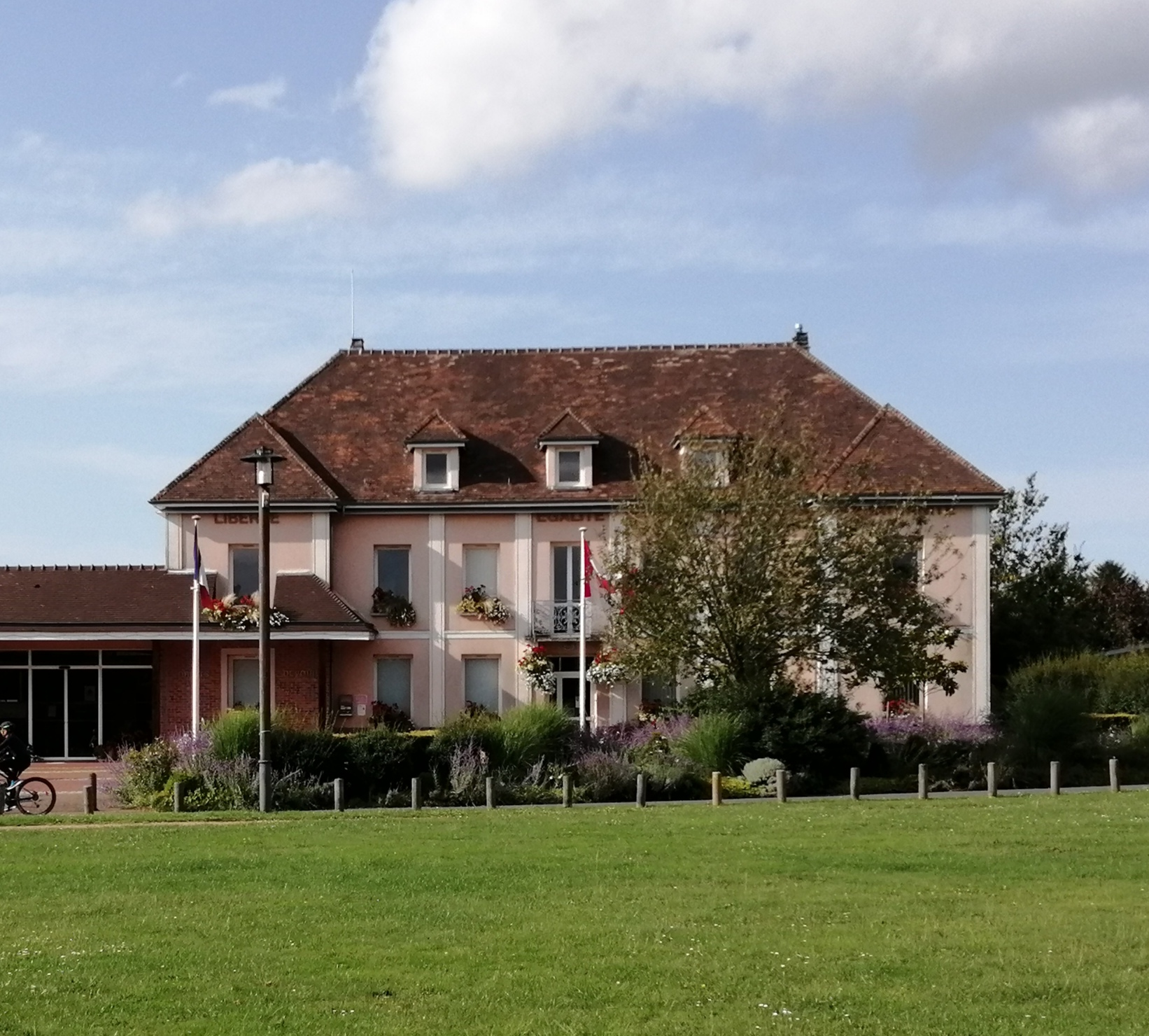
- La Londe Town hall

- Coat of arms
- Location of La Londe
- Location within France Location within Normandy
- Coordinates: 49°18′22″N 0°57′11″E
- Country: France
- Region: Normandy
- Department: Seine-Maritime
- Arrondissement: Rouen
- Canton: Elbeuf
- Intercommunality: Métropole Rouen Normandie

Government
  - Mayor (2026–32): Jean-Pierre Jaouen
- Area^{1}: 30.98 km^{2} (11.96 sq mi)
- Elevation: 128 m (420 ft)
- Highest elevation: 138 m (453 ft)
- Lowest elevation: 20 m (66 ft)
- Population (2023): 2,372
  - Density: 76.57/km^{2} (198.3/sq mi)
- Time zone: UTC+01:00 (CET)
  - Summer (DST): UTC+02:00 (CEST)
- INSEE/Postal code: 76391 /76500
- ^{1} French Land Register data, which excludes lakes, ponds, glaciers > 1 km^{2} (0.386 sq mi or 247 acres) and river estuaries.

La Londe (French pronunciation: [la lɔ̃d]) is a commune in the Seine-Maritime department in the Normandy region in northern France. It was first mentioned in historical records in 1170.

== Geography ==
A forestry and farming village situated some 12 miles (19 km) southwest of Rouen, at the junction of the D132 and the D38 roads. The commune borders the department of the Eure.

== Population ==
Historical population
Year	Pop.	±% p.a.
1968	1,423	—
1975	1,672	+2.33%
1982	1,738	+0.55%
1990	1,900	+1.12%
1999	2,007	+0.61%
2007	2,222	+1.28%
2012	2,274	+0.46%
2017	2,334	+0.52%
2023	2,372	+0.27%
Source: INSEE

== Toponymy ==
Lunda around 1170. There are more than 100 place-names la Londe in Normandy. It means "the wood, the grove". It derives from Old Norse lundr "grove".

== Places of interest ==
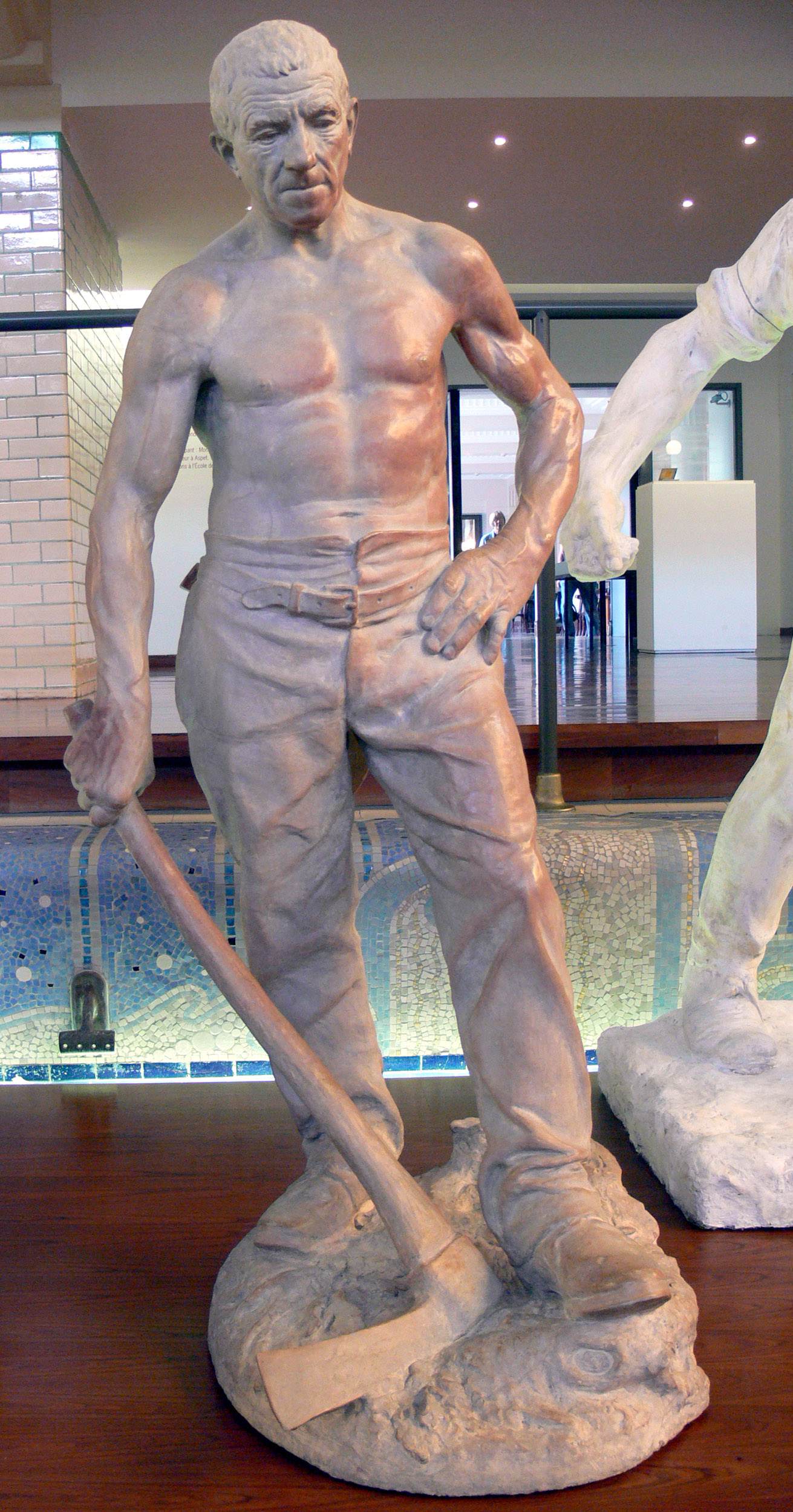
«Le bûcheron de la forêt de La Londe», sculpted by Paul Richer in 1899

- A memorial to the Canadian soldiers that liberated the town in August 1944.
- The church of Notre-Dame, dating from the sixteenth century.
- A seventeenth-century château.
- A stone cross from the sixteenth century.
- Some Roman ruins.

== See also ==
- Communes of the Seine-Maritime department
