= Saint-Sornin, Allier =

Saint-Sornin
- Commune
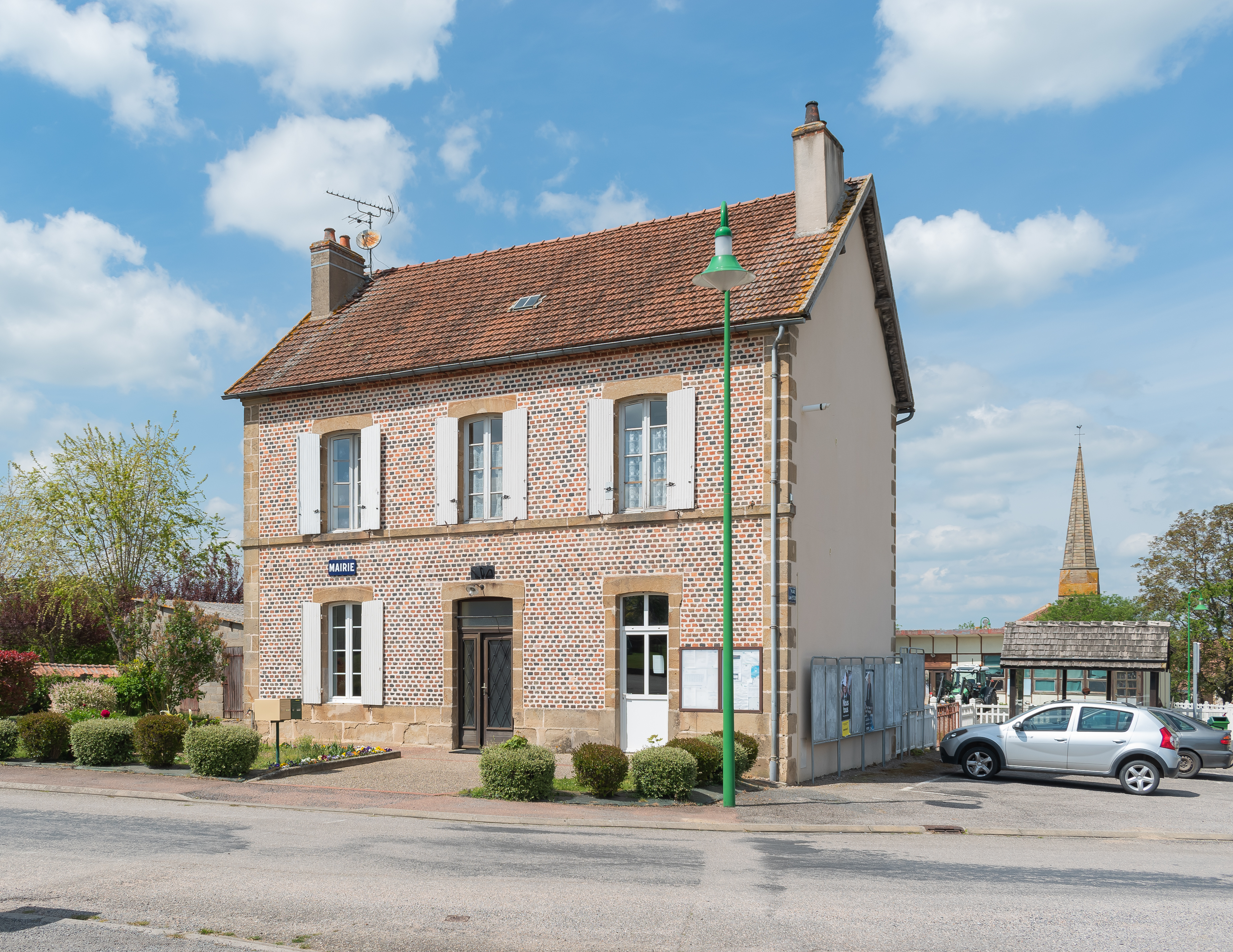
- Town hall of Saint-Sornin Allier
- Location of Saint-Sornin
- Location within France Location within Auvergne-Rhône-Alpes
- Coordinates: 46°24′42″N 3°01′39″E
- Country: France
- Region: Auvergne-Rhône-Alpes
- Department: Allier
- Arrondissement: Moulins
- Canton: Souvigny
- Intercommunality: Bocage Bourbonnais

Government
  - Mayor (2026–32): Daniel Blanchet
- Area^{1}: 19.44 km^{2} (7.51 sq mi)
- Elevation: 413 m (1,355 ft)
- Highest elevation: 458 m (1,503 ft)
- Lowest elevation: 344 m (1,129 ft)
- Population (2023): 220
  - Density: 11/km^{2} (29/sq mi)
- Time zone: UTC+01:00 (CET)
  - Summer (DST): UTC+02:00 (CEST)
- INSEE/Postal code: 03260 /03240
- ^{1} French Land Register data, which excludes lakes, ponds, glaciers > 1 km^{2} (0.386 sq mi or 247 acres) and river estuaries.

Saint-Sornin (French pronunciation: [sɛ̃ sɔʁnɛ̃]) is a commune in the Allier department in Auvergne-Rhône-Alpes in central France.

== Population ==
Historical population
Year	Pop.	±% p.a.
1968	372	—
1975	333	−1.57%
1982	282	−2.35%
1990	210	−3.62%
1999	225	+0.77%
2007	214	−0.62%
2012	237	+2.06%
2017	225	−1.03%
2023	220	−0.37%
Source: INSEE

== Sights ==
- Church Saint-Saturnin which is a 14th-century and 19th-century building.
- Castle of Montbillon, which is a 17th-century and 19th-century building.
- Pond of La Goutte belonged to the Castle of Saint-Hubert in Chavenon

== See also ==
- Bourbonnais
- Communes of the Allier department
