= Delalande =

Delalande is a surname. Notable people with the surname include:

- Michel Richard Delalande (1657–1726), French Baroque composer and organist
- Pierre Antoine Delalande (1787–1823), French naturalist, taxidermist, explorer, and painter
