= Michel Lefrançois de Lalande =

French astronomer (1766–1839)

- Portrait at physionotrace of Michel Lefrançois de Lalande.
- Born: Michel Lefrançois; April 21, 1766; Courcy, Calvados, France
- Died: April 8, 1839 (aged 72)
- Spouse: Marie-Jeanne de Lalande (m. 1788–1832)
- Awards: Legion of Honour
- Scientific career
- Fields: Astronomy

Michel Lefrançois de Lalande (21 April 1766 – 8 April 1839) was a French astronomer. He was the nephew and one of the main collaborators of astronomer Jérôme Lalande.

== Biography ==
Michel Lefrançois was born in Courcy, Calvados in 1766, the son of Jeanne Jourdan and Jean Lefrançois, first cousin of astronomer Jérôme Lalande. He took the name of his cousin Brother Jérôme, by order of the Court of the Seine on 13 June 1837 and became Le François de Lalande him and his descendants.

Jérôme de Lalande took Michel to Paris after the holidays of 1780 and immediately initiated him into his favorite study, that is, telescopic observation techniques, despite having the satisfaction of seeing him take an interest in them. Two years later, Michel's observation of a total lunar eclipse earned him the honor of seeing it published in the magazine journal des savants.

On 27 September 1788 he married Marie-Jeanne Harlay daughter of Jean François Harlay born in 1730 and Anne Cany born in 1744. She was also an astronomer and student of Jérôme.

On 11 January 1789 they had their first child : Isaac, so named in honor of Isaac Newton. On 20 January 1790 his first daughter was born. That same day, the comet discovered by Caroline Herschel is visible for the first time in Paris, so it will be called Caroline. He will die in childhood. his second daughter was born on 7 July 1793 and named Charlotte Uranie having as godfather Jean-Baptiste Delambre, astronomer and as godmother Charlotte of Saxe-Meiningen, Duchess of Gotha. His fourth and last child was born on 26 March 1802 and baptized Charles Auguste Frédéric Jérôme.

In 1789, at the age of 23, Michel Lefrançois de Lalande took over the direction of the observatory of École militaire and began a long series of observations. In three months, it recorded 2,500 stars and the following year more than 8,000. L'histoire céleste française, published by Jérôme Lalande, completed ten years later, has more than 50,000 stars, almost all calculated by Michel, assisted by his wife. He continued with the observations of the stars. In one year, he managed to register 12,000.

In 1792 he accompanied Jean-Baptiste Joseph Delambre, who was appointed to calculate the meridian arc of Dunkirk-Barcelona and thus the length of the meter. Then the Paris meridian and both begin to be measured around Paris..

Between 8 and 9 May 1795, at the age of 29, he detected a faint star which he took to be a simple star. Between the two observations, thanks to the large quarter-circle telescope of the École militaire, he noticed a gap and attributed it to his mistake. But he did not make a 3ª observation that would have allowed him to confirm the star's displacement from the first two observations and realize that it was an unknown planet, the planet Neptune, which was discovered 50 years later by Urbain Le Verrier.

In 1795 he was elected a member of the Bureau des Longitudes and, six years later, became a first-class resident member of the astronomy section of the French Academy of Sciences. He was also promoted to officer of the Legion of Honor. His grave is in the Père Lachaise, east cemetery.
