= Nicole-Reine Lepaute =

French astronomer

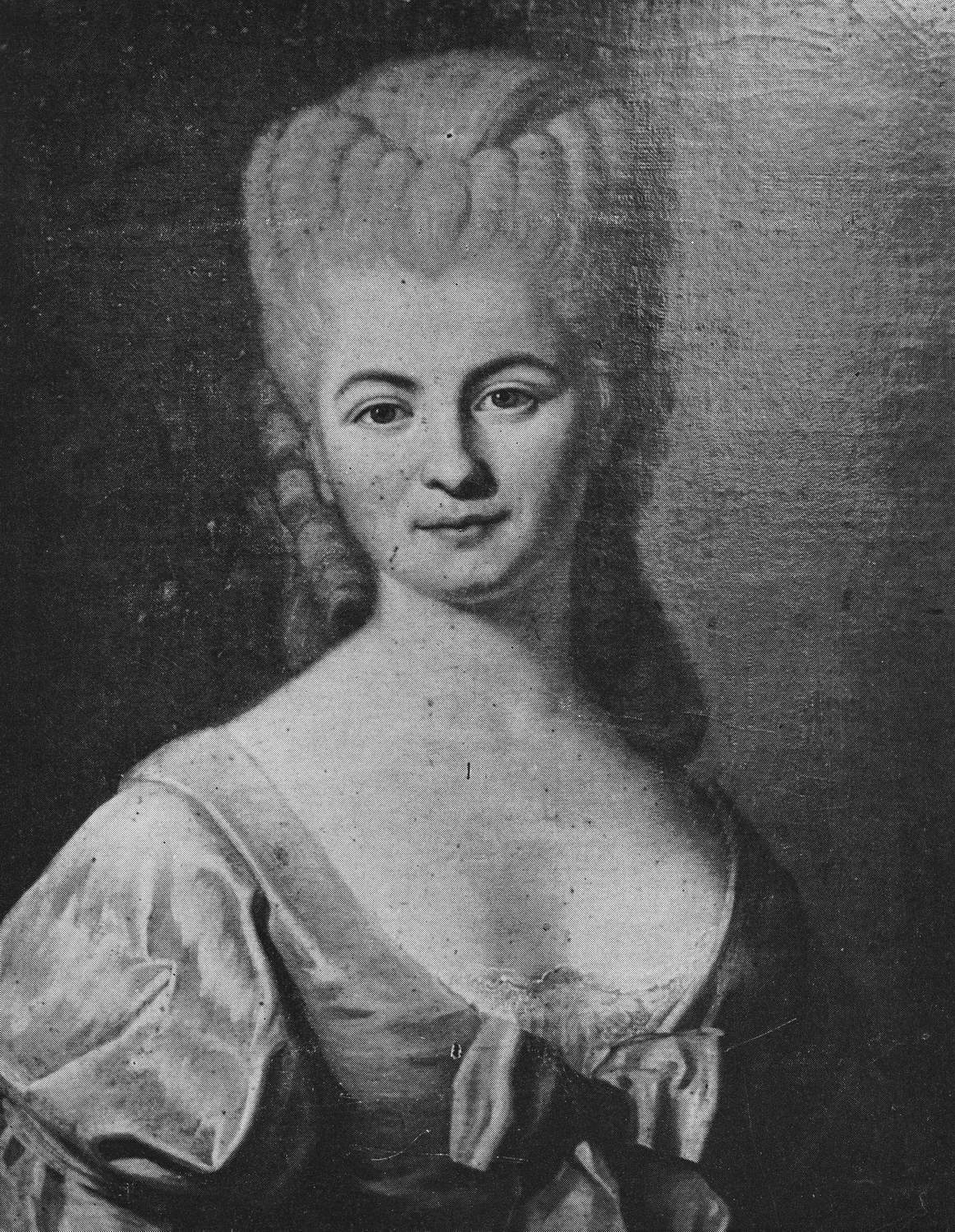
- Born: Nicole-Reine Étable de la Brière; 5 January 1723; Paris
- Died: 6 December 1788 (aged 65); Paris
- Other names: Hortense Lepaute
- Known for: Halley's Comet
- Spouse: Jean-André Lepaute (1749-1788)
- Scientific career
- Fields: Astronomy: Mathematics
- Notable students: Joseph Lepaute Dagelet

Nicole-Reine Lepaute (French pronunciation: [nikɔl ʁɛn ləpot]; née Étable de la Brière, 5 January 1723 – 6 December 1788), also erroneously known as Hortense Lepaute, was a French astronomer and human computer. Lepaute along with Alexis Clairaut and Jérôme Lalande calculated the date of the return of Halley's Comet. Her other astronomical feats include calculating the 1764 solar eclipse and producing almanacs from 1759 to 1783. She was also a member of the Scientific Académie de Béziers.

The asteroid 7720 Lepaute is named in her honour, as is the lunar crater Lepaute.

== Early life ==
Nicole-Reine Lepaute was born on 5 January 1723 in the Luxembourg Palace in Paris as the daughter of Jean Étable, valet in the service of Louise Élisabeth d'Orléans. Her father had worked for the royal family for a long time, both in the service of the duchess de Berry and her sister Louise. Louise Elizabeth of Orleans was a widow of Louis of Spain. When her husband died, she returned to Paris and was given part of Luxembourg to live in and to house her staff members. She was the sixth of nine children. As a child she was described as precocious and intelligent, being mostly self-taught. She stayed up all night "devouring" books and read every book in the library, with Jérôme Lalande saying of her that even as a child "she had too much spirit not to be curious". Lepaute’s interest in astronomy had begun at a young age when she most likely witnessed a comet in the sky. She became eager to learn about it and started her curiosity journey when she started studying about comets. This led to one of the biggest discoveries of her time.

In August 1748, she married Jean-André Lepaute, a royal clockmaker in the Luxembourg Palace.

== Career ==
=== Mathematics of clockmaking ===
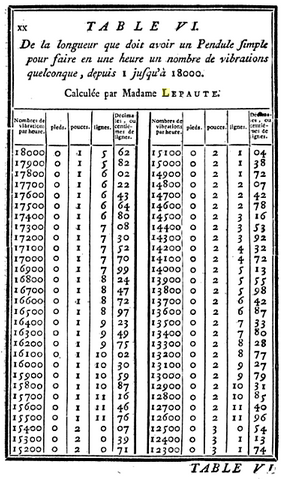
Calculations Lepaute made for the Treatise of Clockmaking

Her marriage gave her the freedom to exercise her scientific skill. At the same time as she kept the household's accounts, she studied astronomy, mathematics, and "she observed, she calculated, and she described the inventions of her husband".

She met Jérôme Lalande, with whom she would work for thirty years, in 1753 when he was called as a representative of the Académie des Sciences to inspect her husband's work on a pendulum of a new type. The three of them worked together on a book titled Traité d'horlogerie (Treatise of Clockmaking) that was published in 1755 under her husband's name. Although she did not receive authorship, Lalande sang her praises later, saying, "Madame Lepaute computed for this book a table of numbers of oscillations for pendulums of different lengths, or the lengths for each given number of vibrations, from that of 18 lignes, that does 18000 vibrations per hour, up to that of 3000 leagues".

Lalande was a leader at heart and helped lead Nicole-Reine Lepaute and her husband through the hard work calculating and creating different astronomical designs for predicting Halley's comet and creating new inventions of the clock. For instance, her husband had made a horizontal clock for the palace of Luxembourg and was granted permission to live there for the remainder of their life before he left for Russia. Lalande also sent in another clock that was made by Lepaute and went as the representative of the Academy of Science to observe this clock. Lalande was a French astronomer who was known for his support of women in science, particularly his collaboration with Nicole-Reine Lepaute. He believed that women were capable of pursuing ambitious scientific work and that their intellectual pursuits were not a threat to the social order. However, despite his support for women in science, Lalande's views were still limited by the social and cultural norms of his time. He believed that women were best suited to assisting male researchers rather than leading their own research projects. He also emphasized the importance of women's roles as wives and mothers, and saw their scientific work as being compatible with their familial duties. In some ways, Lalande's views can be seen as both progressive and limiting. On the one hand, he recognized the intellectual capabilities of women and encouraged them to pursue scientific work. On the other hand, his views still placed women in a secondary role to men and reinforced traditional gender roles. Despite these limitations, Lalande's support for women in science was significant and helped to pave the way for future generations of women scientists.

=== Halley's Comet ===
In June 1757, she worked together with Jérôme Lalande and Alexis Clairaut to calculate the date of the next passage of Halley's Comet, last seen in 1682. Halley couldn't precisely compute the return date beyond "around the end of the year 1758 or the beginning of the next", due to the gravitational pull of Jupiter and Saturn on the comet, which made for a three-body problem that couldn't be solved back then, for which Clairaut had found a solution recently.

In order to solve it, Clairaut, Lalande and Lepaute divided calculations between them and worked in parallel, with Lepaute and Lalande focusing on the attraction of Jupiter and Saturn, while Clairaut calculated the orbit of the comet itself. The team worked for more than six months straight, barely stopping for food, in order to produce a date before the comet arrived. In November 1758, they gave a two-month window for when the comet would reach its perihelion, between 15 March and 15 May, centered around 13 April 1759. The comet ended up arriving on 13 March 1759.

Although this was a tenfold improvement over Halley's initial 2 years period, there was still an error of a few days, which caused the astronomer Jean d'Alembert to ridicule their work and call it "more laborious than deep".

Lepaute's involvement largely went unrecognised, and, while Lalande acknowledged her work in his Théorie des Comètes (Comet Theory), insisting that they could never have done the calculations without her, Clairault removed mentions of her from the book he published in 1760, Théorie du mouvement des comètes, allegedly to please another woman.

=== Later mathematical accomplishments ===
In 1759, Lalande became the Director of the Connaissance des Temps (Knowledge of the times), an astronomical almanac published by the Académie des Sciences, and he appointed Lepaute as his assistant. She did calculations from the computing plans Lalande prepared until 1774 and made various contributions to the almanac, including calculations on a 1762 comet, as well as a table of parallactic angles.

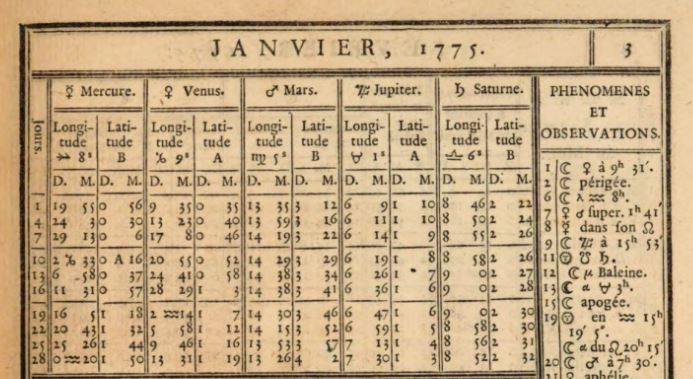
Page of the Ephemerides for the year 1775, in which Lepaute calculated the position of Saturn

Afterwards, she worked on Éphémerides, annual guides for astronomers and navigators. She calculated the position of Saturn for each day of the year from 1775 to 1784 for the seventh volume, published in 1774, and she calculated on her own the daily positions of the Sun, the Moon and the planets for the eighth volume (1785-1792, published 1784).

She also computed in 1762 the exact time of an annular solar eclipse that occurred on 1 April 1764 and published two maps under her own name that showed the eclipse's extent: one over Europe, which showed the eclipse's transit in 15-minutes intervals, and one that detailed its successive phases over Paris.

The solar eclipse that occurred on 1 April 1764 was a significant event that garnered a great deal of public interest across Europe. At the time, solar eclipses were still not fully understood and were viewed as mysterious and sometimes ominous events. The eclipse of 1764 was particularly noteworthy because it was visible across a large portion of Europe, including in Paris where it was near total. Many people gathered to observe the eclipse, and it was widely reported in newspapers and other publications of the time.In addition to the public interest in the eclipse, it also had scientific significance. Astronomers saw it as an opportunity to test the accuracy of their calculations of the motion of the Moon, which is an important factor in predicting solar and lunar eclipses. Nicole-Reine Lepaute and her husband, Jean-André Lepaute, were among the astronomers who worked to calculate the precise timing of the eclipse and to observe its effects.

Her work went largely unappreciated and unrewarded despite its importance. While Lalande would eventually become a professor of astronomy and the director of the Paris Observatory, she kept working for him for fifteen years as a human computer. She nonetheless became a member of the distinguished Scientific Academy of Béziers in 1761, for which she calculated the ephemeris of the transit of Venus this year. Lalande always recognised her work, and, after her death, he wrote a brief biography about her contributions to astronomy in his Astronomical Bibliography.

Doing so many calculations over the course of thirty years affected her sight to the point she had to stop working in 1783.

== Personal life ==
While childless herself, she adopted her husband's nephew, Joseph Lepaute Dagelet in 1768 and trained him in astronomy and advanced mathematics, which Lalande includes in her contributions to astronomy. He travelled south to the Terra Australis in 1773, became a professor of mathematics at Paris' Military School and became inducted in the French Royal Academy of Sciences in 1785. He most likely died in a shipwreck during a scientific expedition led by Jean-François de Lapérouse in 1788.

Nicole Lepaute spent the last seven years of her life taking care of her terminally ill husband until she died in Paris, in the parish of Saint-Roch, on 6 December 1788.

== List of works ==
- Tables of the length a pendulum must have for a given number of oscillations per hour, in Jean-André Lepaute's Treatise of Clockmaking, Paris, augmented edition of 1767, first edited 1755
- Various contributions to the Connaissance des Temps from 1759 to 1774
- Lost memoirs for the Académie de Béziers from 1761
- Figure of the twelve phases of 1 April 1764 solar eclipse for Paris, 1762
- Map of the passage of the shadow of the Moon over Europe during 1 April 1764, 1762
- Table of parallactic angles for Paris's latitude, La Connaissance des Temps, 1763, p133-144 and Exposition du calcul astronomique, Jérôme Lalande, 1762, Paris
- Ephemerides of Saturn, Ephemerides of celestial movements for the meridian of Paris, volume 7 (1775-1784), 1774
- Ephemerides of the Sun, the moon and the planets, Ephemerides of celestial movements for the meridian of Paris, volume 8 (1785-1792), 1783

== Legacy ==
Philibert Commerson attempted to name the Hydrangea flower Lepautia or Peautia after Lepaute. However, the flower's accepted name later became Hortensia. This led to people believing Lepaute's name was Hortense, but the Larousse remarks that this is erroneous, and that the name probably came from hortus, garden.

== See also ==
- Louise du Pierry
- Timeline of women in science
