= Lalande-de-Pomerol =

- Commune
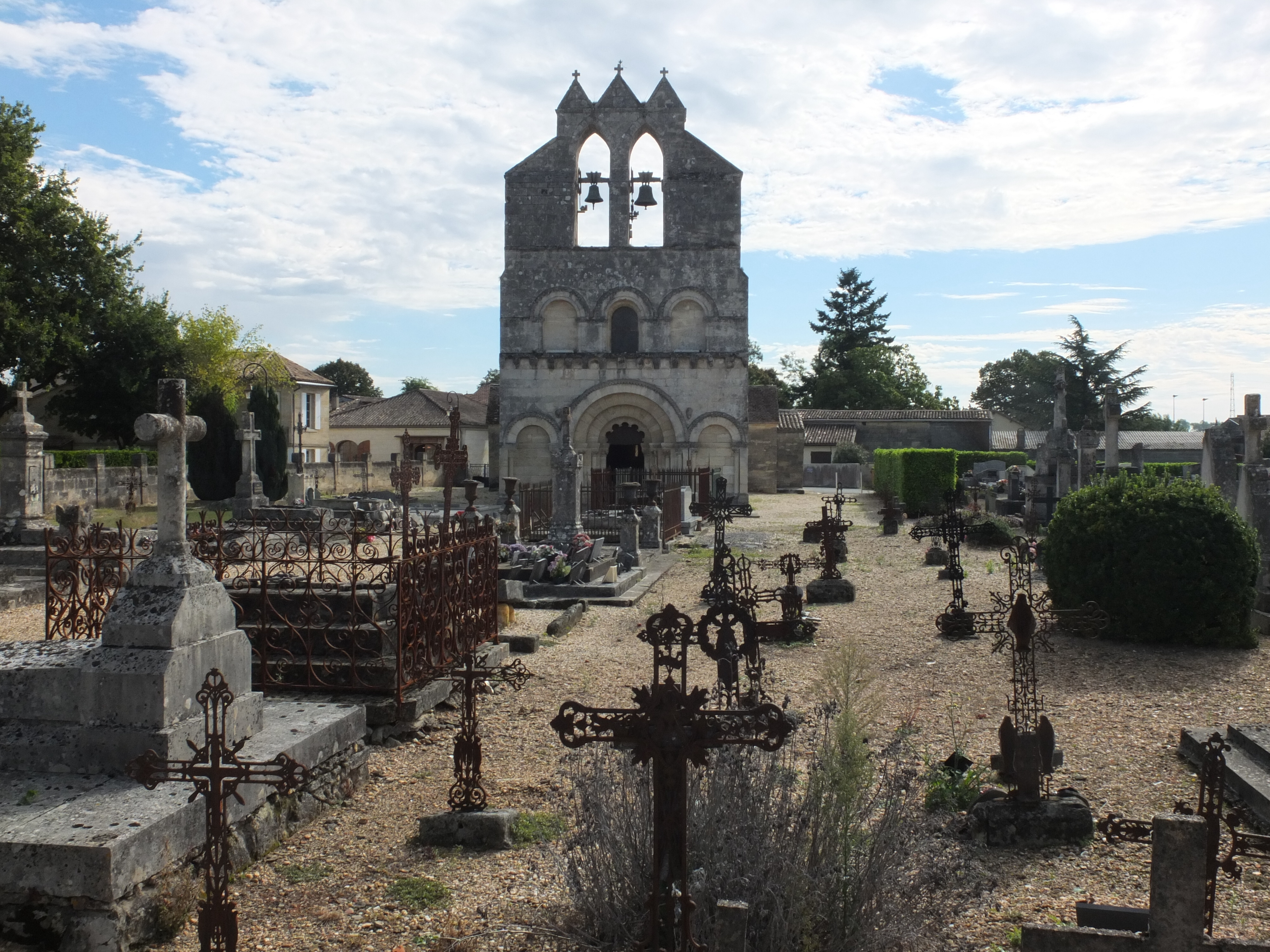
- The church in Lalande

- Coat of arms
- Location of Lalande-de-Pomerol
- Location within France Location within Nouvelle-Aquitaine
- Coordinates: 44°57′24″N 0°12′29″W
- Country: France
- Region: Nouvelle-Aquitaine
- Department: Gironde
- Arrondissement: Libourne
- Canton: Le Libournais-Fronsadais
- Intercommunality: CA Libournais

Government
  - Mayor (2020–2026): Philippe Durand-Teyssier
- Area^{1}: 8.25 km^{2} (3.19 sq mi)
- Elevation: 10 m (33 ft)
- Highest elevation: 37 m (121 ft)
- Lowest elevation: 5 m (16 ft)
- Population (2023): 618
  - Density: 74.9/km^{2} (194/sq mi)
- Time zone: UTC+01:00 (CET)
  - Summer (DST): UTC+02:00 (CEST)
- INSEE/Postal code: 33222 /33500
- ^{1} French Land Register data, which excludes lakes, ponds, glaciers > 1 km^{2} (0.386 sq mi or 247 acres) and river estuaries.

Lalande-de-Pomerol (French pronunciation: [lalɑ̃d də pɔmʁɔl], literally Lalande of Pomerol) is a commune in the Gironde department in Nouvelle-Aquitaine in southwestern France, that produces red wine.

== Population ==
Historical population
Year	Pop.	±% p.a.
1968	631	—
1975	704	+1.58%
1982	723	+0.38%
1990	715	−0.14%
1999	614	−1.68%
2007	683	+1.34%
2012	668	−0.44%
2017	655	−0.39%
2023	618	−0.96%
Source: INSEE

== See also ==
- Communes of the Gironde department
