= Jérôme Lalande =

French astronomer (1732–1807)

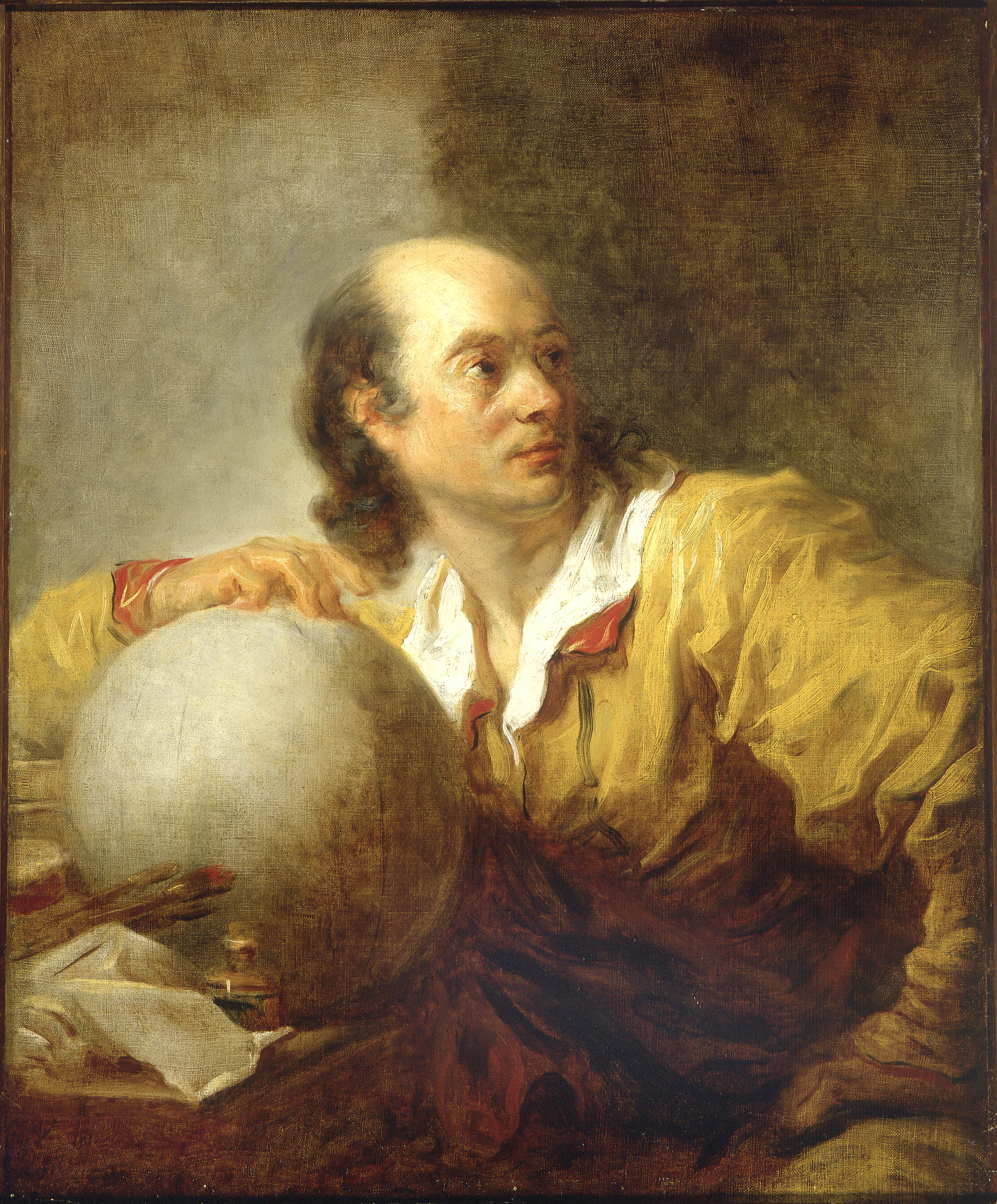
- Jérôme de La Lande by Jean-Honoré Fragonard, c. 1769
- Born: Joseph Jérôme Lefrançois de Lalande; 11 July 1732; Bourg-en-Bresse, France
- Died: 4 April 1807 (aged 74); Paris, France
- Scientific career
- Fields: Astronomy
- Workplaces: Paris Observatory
- Doctoral advisor: Joseph-Nicolas Delisle; Pierre Charles Le Monnier
- Doctoral students: Jean Baptiste Joseph Delambre

Joseph Jérôme Lefrançois de Lalande (French: [lalɑ̃d]; 11 July 1732 – 4 April 1807) was a French astronomer, freemason and writer. He is known for having estimated a precise value of the astronomical unit (the distance from the Earth to the Sun) using measurements of the transit of Venus in 1769.

== Biography ==
Lalande was born at Bourg-en-Bresse (département of Ain) to Pierre Lefrançois and Marie‐Anne‐Gabrielle Monchinet. His parents sent him to Paris to study law, but as a result of lodging in the Hôtel Cluny, where Joseph-Nicolas Delisle had his observatory, he was drawn to astronomy, and became the zealous and favoured pupil of both Delisle and Pierre Charles Le Monnier. Having completed his legal studies, he was about to return to Bourg to practise as an advocate, when Le Monnier obtained permission to send him to Berlin, to make observations on the lunar parallax in concert with those of Nicolas Louis de Lacaille at the Cape of Good Hope.

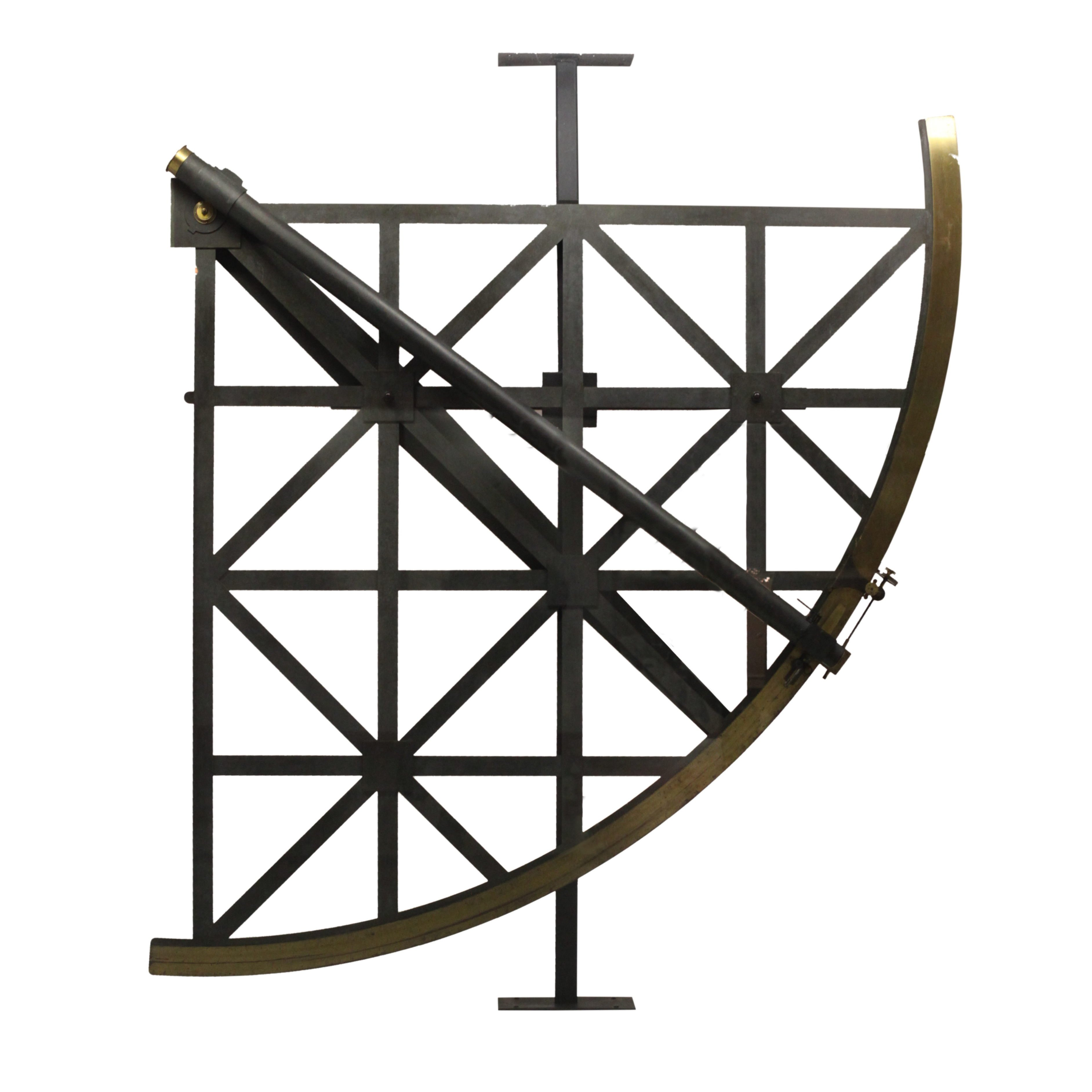
Quarter of a circle by the English instrument-maker Jonathan Sisson, used by Jérôme Lalande to measure the distance between the Earth and the Moon in 1751.

The successful execution of this task obtained for him, before he was twenty-one, admission to the Academy of Berlin, as well as his election as an adjunct astronomer to the French Academy of Sciences. He now devoted himself to the improvement of the planetary theory, publishing in 1759 a corrected edition of Edmond Halley's tables, with a history of Halley's Comet whose return in that year he had helped Alexis Clairaut and Nicole-Reine Lepaute to calculate. In 1762, Delisle resigned the chair of astronomy in the Collège de France in Lalande's favour. The duties were discharged by Lalande for forty-six years. His house became an astronomical seminary, and amongst his pupils were Jean Baptiste Joseph Delambre, Giuseppe Piazzi, Pierre Méchain, and his own nephew Michel Lefrançois de Lalande. By his publications in connection with the transit of Venus of 1769 he won great fame. However, his difficult personality lost him some popularity.

In 1766, Lalande, with Claude Adrien Helvétius, founded the Les Sciences lodge in Paris, and received its recognition from Grand Orient de France in 1772. In 1776, he changed its name to Les Neuf Soeurs, and arranged for Benjamin Franklin to be chosen as the first worshipful master.

Although his investigations were conducted with diligence rather than genius, Lalande's career was an eminent one. As a lecturer and writer he helped popularise astronomy. His planetary tables, into which he introduced corrections for mutual perturbations, were the best available up to the end of the 18th century. In 1801, he endowed the Lalande Prize, administered by the French Academy of Sciences, for advances in astronomy. Pierre-Antoine Véron, the young astronomer who for the first time in history determined the size of the Pacific Ocean from east to west, was Lalande's disciple.

Lalande was an atheist, and wrote a dictionary of atheists with supplements that appeared in print posthumously.

He never married. He was believed to have an illegitimate daughter Marie-Jeanne de Lalande whom he trained in mathematics so that she could help him with his work; according to more recent research she was not his daughter. Astronomer Louise du Pierry was his mistress and scientific collaborator.

== Near discovery of Neptune ==
In February 1847 Sears C. Walker of the US Naval Observatory was searching historical records and surveys for possible prediscovery sightings of the planet Neptune that had been discovered the year before. He found that observations made by Lalande's nephew, Michel Lefrançois de Lalande in 1795 were in the direction of Neptune's position in the sky at that time and that Neptune might appear in the observation records. On 8 May and again on 10 May 1795 a star was observed and recorded with uncertainty noted on its position with a colon, this notation could also indicate an observing error so it was not until the original records of the observatory were reviewed that it was established with certainty that the object was Neptune and the position error between the two nights was due to the planet's motion across the sky. The discovery of these records of Neptune's position in 1795 led to a better calculation of the planet's orbit.

== Women in astronomy ==
Lalande wrote Astronomie de dames in 1785, in honor to women in astronomy. In the prefaces he mentions Hypatia, Maria Cunitz, Maria Clara Eimmart, Jeanne Dumée, Elisabeth Hevelius, Maddalena and Teresa Manfredi, Maria Margaretha Kirch and her daughters Christine and Margaretha Kirch, Émilie du Châtelet, Elżbieta Ogińska Countess of Puzynina, Nicole-Reine Lepaute, Louise du Pierry, Caroline Herschel, Princess Charlotte of Saxe-Meiningen and Marie-Jeanne de Lalande.

== Awards and recognition ==
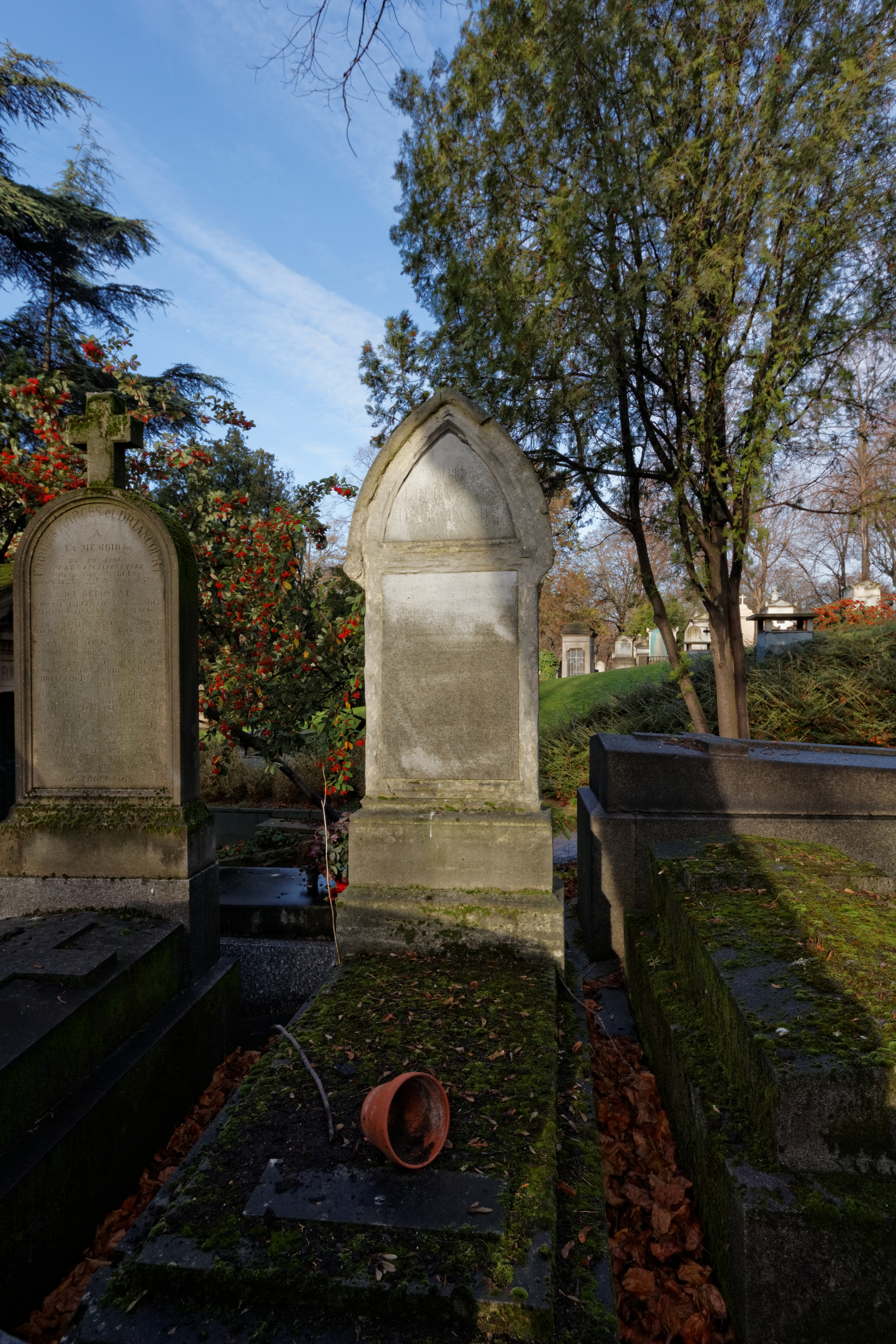
Tomb at cimetière du Père-Lachaise.

- In 1765, Lalande was elected a member of the Royal Swedish Academy of Sciences.
- In 1781, he was elected a Foreign Honorary Member of the American Academy of Arts and Sciences.
- His name is one of the 72 names inscribed on the Eiffel Tower.
- The crater Lalande on the Moon is named after him.
- A high school in Bourg-en-Bresse is named after Lalande. This high school was awarded the Médaille de la Résistance in recognition of the wartime conduct of its teachers and pupils, a unique case among all schools in France.

== Notable works ==
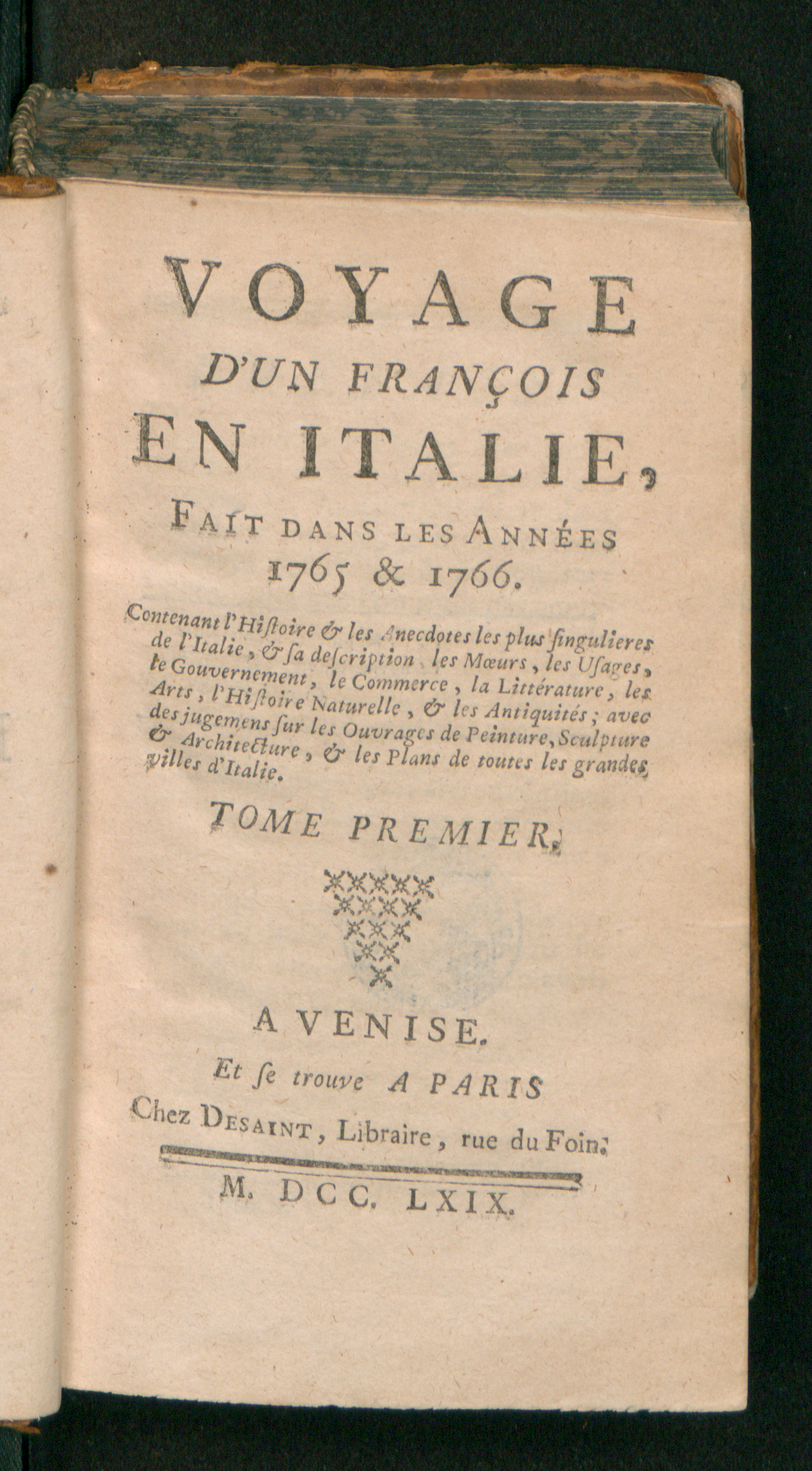
Voyage d'un françois en Italie, fait dans les années 1765 et 1766. Tome premier, 1769

His published works include:

- Traité d'astronomie (1st Ed., 2 vols., 1764; 2nd Ed., 4 vols., 1771–1781; 3rd Ed., 3 vols., 1792)
- Histoire céleste française (1801), giving the places of 47,390 stars
- Bibliographie astronomique (1803), with a history of astronomy from 1780 to 1802
- Astronomie des dames (1785)
- Abrégé de navigation (1793)
- Voyage d'un françois en Italie (1769), a valuable record of his travel in 1765–1766.
- Journal d'un voyage en Angleterre (1763) Diary of a Trip to England (English translation 2002, 2014 including two biographies of Lalande and an examination of the structure of the diary)

He communicated more than one hundred and fifty papers to the French Academy of Sciences, edited the Connoissance de temps (1759–1774), and again (1794–1807), and wrote the concluding two volumes of the 2nd edition of Montucla's Histoire des mathématiques (1802).

=== Publications ===
- Astronomie (in French). Vol. 1. Paris: veuve Nicolas Desaint. 1771.
- Astronomie (in French). Vol. 2. Paris: veuve Nicolas Desaint. 1771.
- Astronomie (in French). Vol. 3. Paris: veuve Nicolas Desaint. 1771.

== See also ==
- Lalande 21185
- Les Neuf Sœurs
- Felis (constellation)
- Quadrans Muralis
- Atlas Coelestis
- Officina Typographica
- VY Canis Majoris
