= Cunitz (crater) =

Crater on Venus

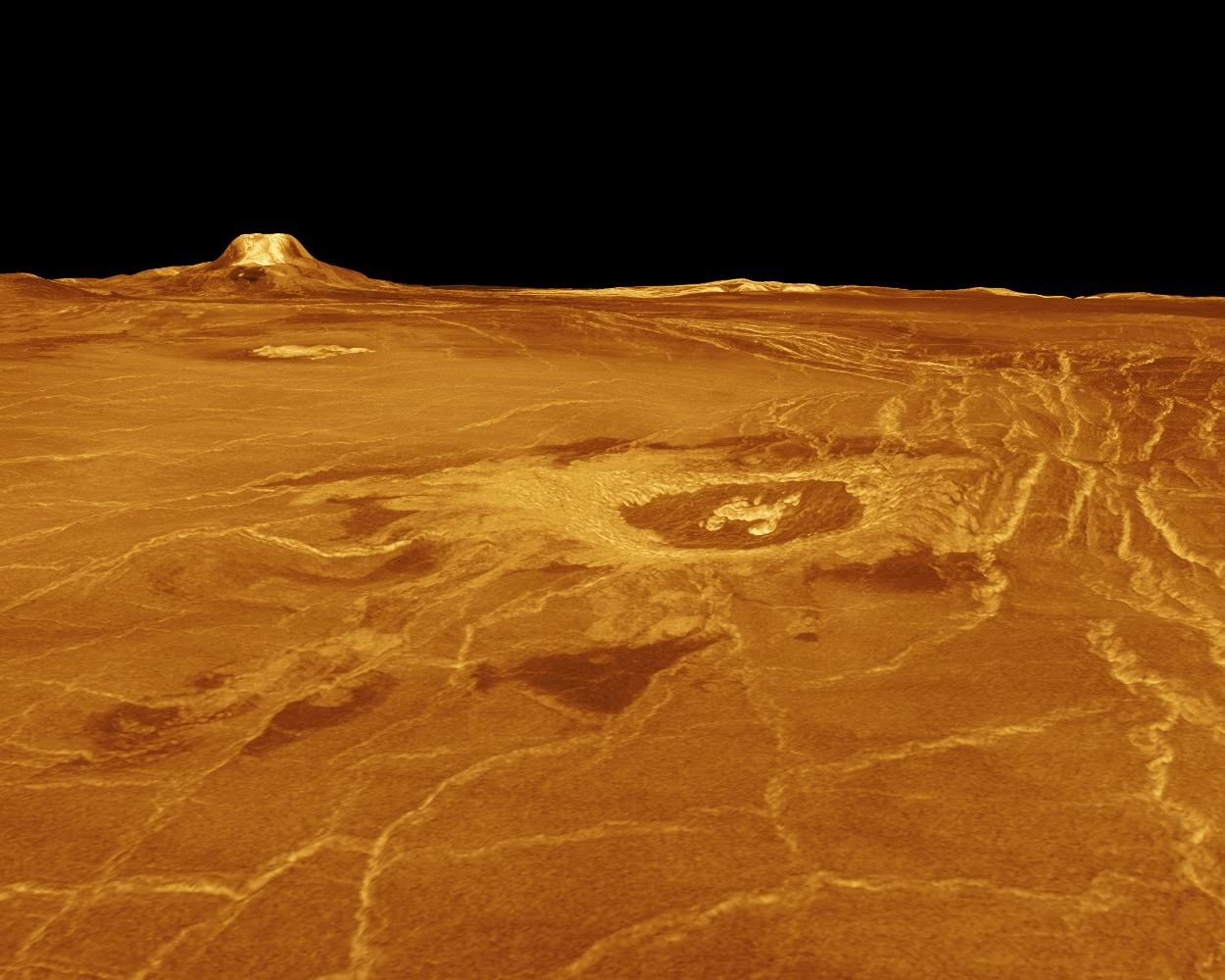
- Simulated view of Cunitz. Gula Mons is visible in the background.
- Location: Venus
- Coordinates: 14.5°N 350.9°E
- Diameter: 48.6 km
- Eponym: Maria Cunitz

Cunitz is a crater on Venus at latitude 14.5, longitude 350.9 in western Eistla Regio. It is 48.6 km in diameter and was named for a 17th-century Silesian astronomer Maria Cunitz.
