= Sif Mons =

Active shield volcano on Venus

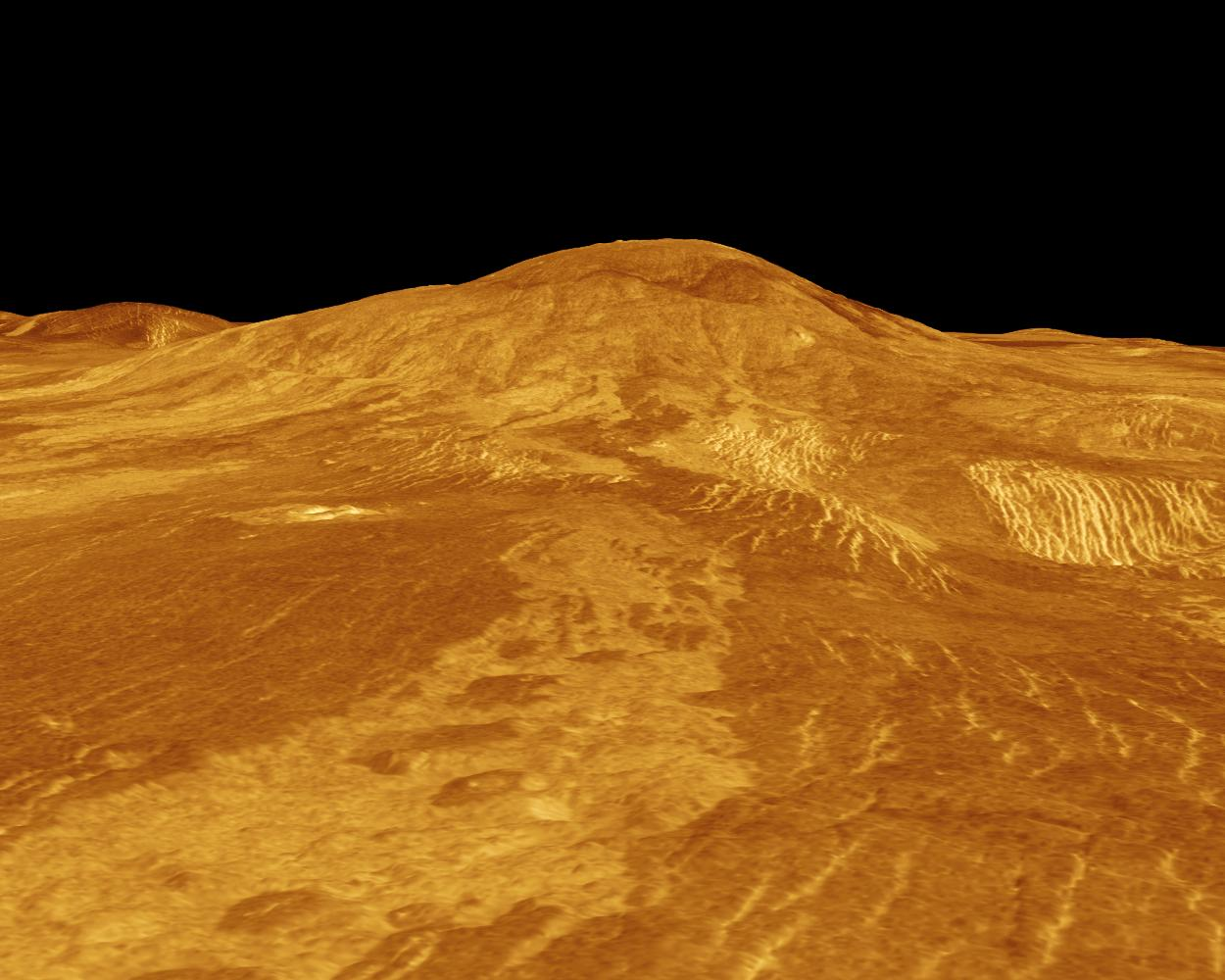
- False-color computer-generated view from the north, with height exaggerated
- Feature type: Shield volcano
- Location: Eistla Regio, Venus
- Coordinates: 22.0°N 7.6°W
- Diameter: 210 km (main structure); 1 200 km (lava flow apron)
- Peak: 2 km (base-to-peak)
- Eponym: Sif

Sif Mons is a large shield volcano located in western Eistla Regio, a highland region on Venus. It is composed of a main volcanic structure with a 40-kilometre (25 mi) wide summit caldera surrounded by an outer apron of lava flows 1,200 kilometres (750 mi) in diameter. It rises about 2 kilometres (1.2 mi) from its base. It is one of a few extraterrestrial volcanoes where signs of ongoing volcanic activity have been observed, with candidate eruptions in 1990 and 1992. It is named after the Norse goddess Sif; the name Sif Mons was officially adopted by the International Astronomical Union (IAU) in 1982.

== Geography and morphology ==
Sif Mons lies in western Eistla Regio, a roughly 2,500-by-1,500-kilometre (1,550 mi × 930 mi) highland in Venus's northern hemisphere that rises 0.5–1.0 kilometre (0.31–0.62 mi) high. Sif Mons lies 750 kilometres (470 mi) to the west of the larger Gula Mons, and together the two mountains dominate the center of western Eistla Regio.

Sif Mons is a broad shield volcano rising 2 kilometres (1.2 mi) from its base. It is composed of a central main structure 210 kilometres (130 mi) in diameter, surrounded by an outer apron of lava flows extending up to 600 kilometres (370 mi) from the center. The main structure has slopes of 1–3°, which drop to 0.15–0.25° in the outer flow apron; the main structure has a volume of about 1,600 cubic kilometres (380 cu mi). Multiple figures have been given for the total diameter of the mountain, from several hundreds of kilometres to a thousand kilometres. Its 40-kilometre (25 mi) diameter summit caldera is nearly circular, with a relatively flat and smooth floor. Near its center, a linear trench extends radially in a northwest–southeast direction. The caldera's southern rim is well-defined, but its lower northern rim is less distinct and appears as a series of lineaments, partly covered by caldera lava flows. The northern rim lies 200 metres (660 ft) below the southern rim, and the caldera itself is no more than several hundred metres deep. Nested groups of smaller calderas overlap the main caldera's northern and northeastern rims. The smaller calderas range from 1.5 to 6.5 kilometres (0.93 to 4.04 mi) in size, with the northeastern group partially flooded by lava from the main caldera. Chains of smaller pits 0.4–1.5 kilometres (0.25–0.93 mi) in size extend away from the southern main caldera rim to the southeast. Over 50 such pits have been identified on Sif Mons's summit.

Flank eruption sites are common around Sif Mons, forming small secondary structures on its slopes. Many of these flank structures are surrounded by flow deposits of their own; one northern cone's lava flow extends over 200 kilometres (120 mi) to the north into Sedna Planitia. A system of fractures oriented radially from its center occupy most of its flanks; they are less prominent than the ones on Gula Mons. The fractures are best developed on Sif Mons's northwest flank, while being absent from the northeast. These fractures cross older lava flows, and some younger lava flows have been channelized through the fractures. To the east, lava flows from Sif Mons and Gula Mons meet. At this point, flows from Sif Mons are turned to the northwest by the elevated Idem-Kuva and Nissaba coronae.

== Geology ==
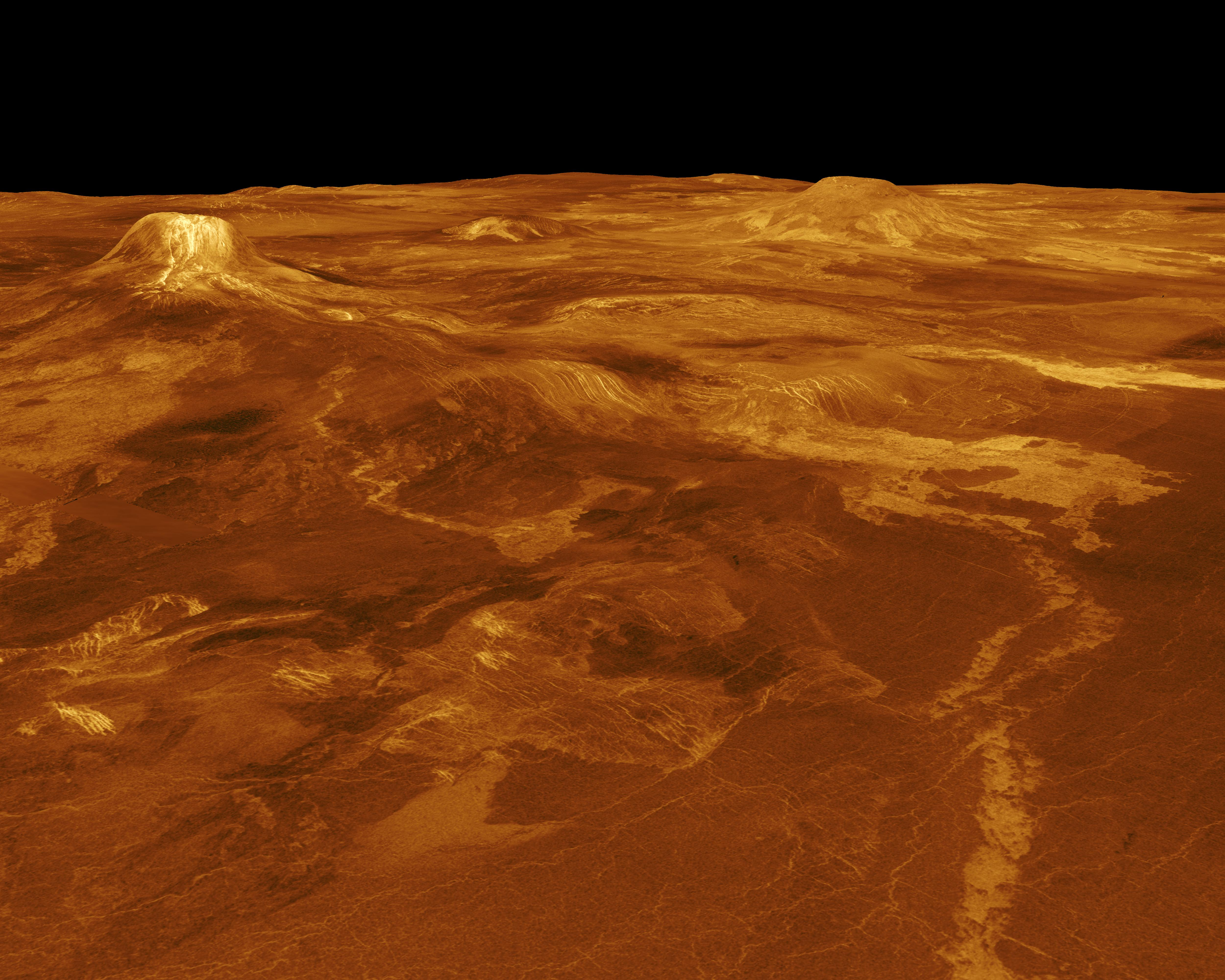
Computer-generated view of Sif Mons (right) and Gula Mons (left). Height is exaggerated.

Western Eistla Regio is a dome-shaped highland dominated by Sif and Gula Montes and their associated volcanic fields and plains. The highland also hosts several smaller volcanic structures and two coronae on its northern flank. According to the crater counting method, the age of the highland is similar to the 0.5–1.0 billion year age calculated for Venus's surface as a whole.

Western Eistla Regio is associated with regional extensional tectonics, which may represent an extension of a tectonic zone involving Aphrodite Terra, Atla Regio, and Beta Regio. Faulting in western Eistla Regio predates and postdates volcanic activity. Gravity anomaly and topography data suggest the presence of a mantle plume below. Using the principle of cross-cutting relationships and embayment, volcanic activity in the western Eistla Regio area first formed the radar-dark volcanic plains. The region is then uplifted, after which Sif and Gula Montes formed.

=== Deposits ===
Radar-dark flows cover Sif Mons's western and southwestern flanks 12 and 70 kilometres (7.5 and 43.5 mi) away from the caldera, possibly composed of lava similar to smooth pāhoehoe. Fan-shaped deposits of radar-bright flows, possibly made of lava similar to ʻaʻā, sit mostly on the eastern flank 35 kilometres (22 mi) from the caldera.

=== Structure and past activity ===
Sif Mons's caldera indicates that a magma chamber at least 40 kilometres (25 mi) in diameter lies underneath. Theoretical modelling of the depth of the neutral buoyancy zone—the region where magma accumulates—places the magma chamber about 2 kilometres (1.2 mi) below the summit. The presence of the smaller collapse structures suggests that subsurface magma has been drained and refilled many times, and that magma has over time migrated to shallower secondary chambers. Subsurface dikes or weak zones may have influenced shallow magma movement, leading to the creation of the pit chains.

=== Possible ongoing activity ===
On 27 May 2024, a paper was published reporting evidence of ongoing volcanic activity at Sif Mons. Using synthetic-aperture radar (SAR) data collected during the Magellan spacecraft mission, the authors identified changes in radar backscatter on the flank of Sif Mons and across a western regions of Niobe Planitia. These changes, which took place between 1990 and 1992, are likely due to lava flows that erupted within the aforementioned timeframe. Alternative causes for the observed changes were ruled out; variations from different viewing angles were accounted for in the analysis, and the observed changes were inconsistent with dune fields observed elsewhere on Venus. The lava flows on Sif Mons occupy its western flank, flowing downslope and covering older flows. The lava flows are estimated to be roughly 30 km^{2} in area, comparable in size to flows erupted from the Kīlauea volcano in Hawaii during a 3-month eruption in 2018.
