= Venera 4 =

1967 Soviet Venus probe

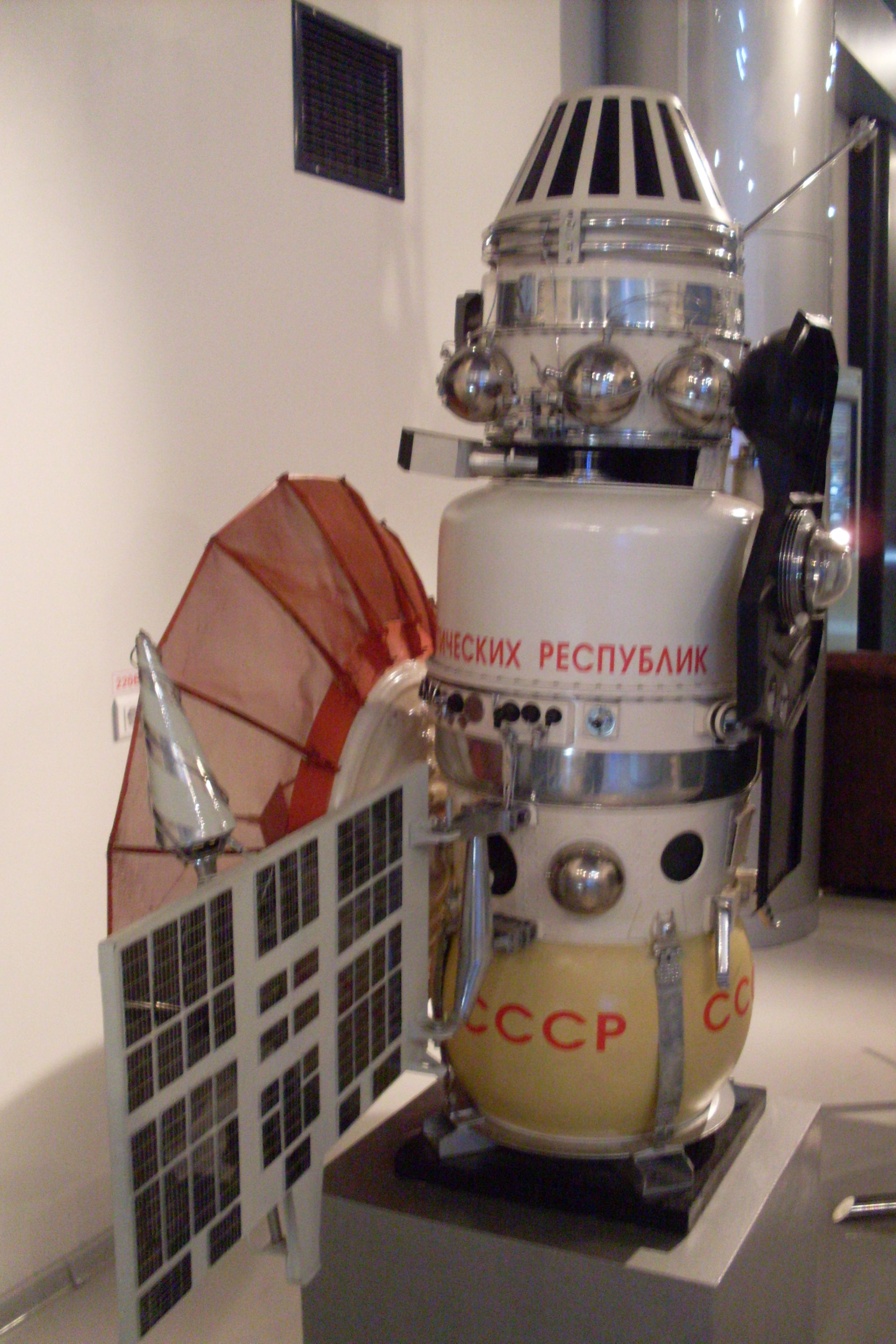
- Venera 4 model
- Mission type: Venus lander
- Operator: GSMZ Lavochkin
- COSPAR ID: 1967-058A
- SATCAT no.: 02840
- Mission duration: 127 days

Spacecraft properties
- Spacecraft: 4V-1
- Manufacturer: GSMZ Lavochkin
- Launch mass: 1,106 kg
- Dry mass: 377 kg

Start of mission
- Launch date: 12 June 1967, 02:39:45 UT
- Rocket: Molniya 8K78M
- Launch site: Baikonur, Site 1/5
- Contractor: TsSKB-Progress

End of mission
- Last contact: 18 October 1967, 04:34 GMT

Orbital parameters
- Reference system: Heliocentric
- Perihelion altitude: 0.71 AU
- Aphelion altitude: 1.02 AU
- Inclination: 4.3°
- Period: 293 days

Venus impact (failed landing)
- Impact date: 18 October 1967, 04:34 GMT
- Impact site: 19°N 38°E (Eistla Regio)
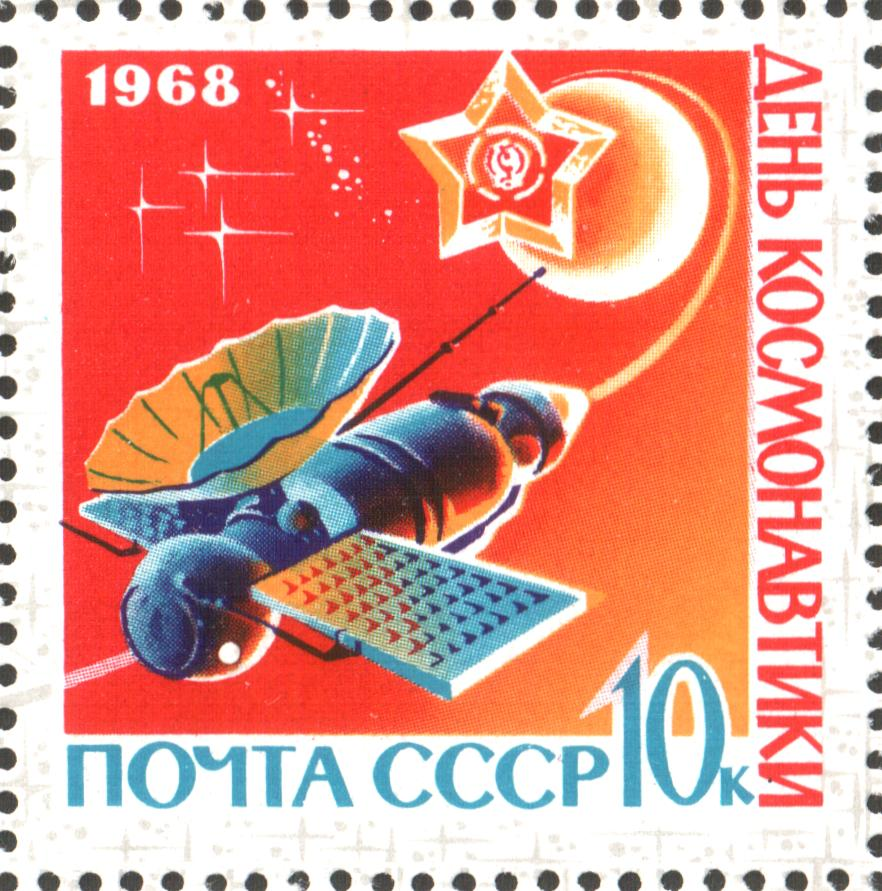
- Venera

Venera 4 (Russian: Венера-4, lit. 'Venus-4'), also designated 4V-1 No.310, was a probe in the Soviet Venera program for the exploration of Venus. The probe comprised a lander, designed to enter the Venusian atmosphere and parachute to the surface, and a carrier/flyby spacecraft, which carried the lander to Venus and served as a communications relay for it.

In 1967, it was the first successful probe to perform in-place analysis of the environment of another planet. Venera 4 provided the first chemical analysis of the Venusian atmosphere, showing it to be primarily carbon dioxide with a few percents of nitrogen and below one percent of oxygen and water vapor. While entering the atmosphere it became the first spacecraft to survive entry into another planet's atmosphere. The station detected a weak magnetic field and no radiation field. The outer atmospheric layer contained very little hydrogen and no atomic oxygen. The probe sent the first direct measurements proving that Venus was extremely hot, that its atmosphere was far denser than expected, and that it had lost most of its water long ago.

== Spacecraft ==
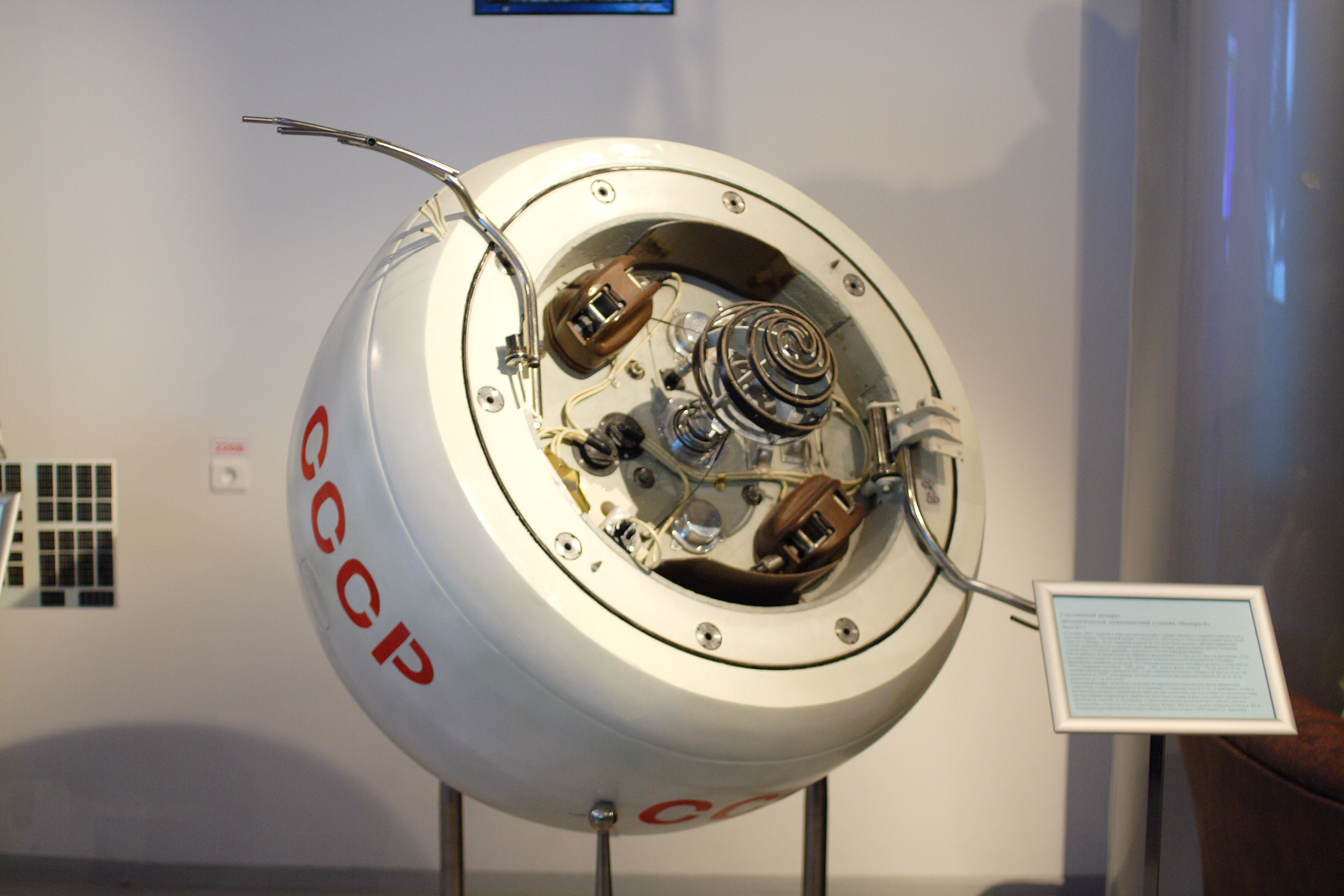
A model of the 1-meter diameter landing capsule of Venera 4 on display at the Memorial Museum of Cosmonautics in Moscow.

The main carrier spacecraft 4 stood 3.5 metres (11 ft) high, its solar panels spanned 4 metres (13 ft) and had an area of 2.5 square metres (27 sq ft). The carrier spacecraft included a 2 metres (6 ft 7 in) long magnetometer, an ion detector, a cosmic ray detector and an ultraviolet spectrometer capable of detecting hydrogen and oxygen gases. The devices were intended to operate until entry into the Venusian atmosphere. At that juncture, the station was designed to release the probe capsule and disintegrate. The rear part of the carrier spacecraft contained a liquid-fuel thruster capable of correcting the flight course. The flight program was planned to include two significant course corrections, for which purpose the station could receive and execute up to 127 different commands sent from the Earth.

The front part of the carrier spacecraft contained a nearly spherical landing capsule 1 metre (3 ft 3 in) in diameter and weighing 383 kilograms (844 lb). Compared to previous (failed) Venera probes, the capsule contained an improved heat shield that could withstand temperatures up to 11,000 °C (19,800 °F). Instead of the previous liquid-based cooling design, a simpler and more reliable gas system was installed. The durability of the capsule was checked by exposing it to high temperatures, pressures, and accelerations using three unique testing installations. The heat resistance was checked in a high-temperature vacuum system emulating the upper layers of the atmosphere. The capsule was pressurized up to 25 atmospheres. (The surface pressure on Venus was unknown at the time. Estimates ranged from a few to hundreds of atmospheres). Finally, it was subjected to accelerations of up to 450 g in a centrifuge. The centrifuge test caused cracking of electronic components and cable brackets, which were replaced shortly before launch. The timing for the launch was rather tight, so as not to miss the launch window — the days of the year when the path to the destination planet from Earth is energetically least demanding.

The capsule could float in case of a water landing. Considering the possibility of such a landing, its designers made the lock of the capsule using sugar; it was meant to dissolve in liquid water, releasing the transmitter antennas. The capsule contained a newly developed vibration-damping system, and its parachute could resist temperatures up to 450 °C (723 K).

The capsule contained an altimeter, thermal control, a parachute and equipment for making atmospheric measurements. The latter included a thermometer, barometer, hydrometer, altimeter and a set of gas analysis instruments. The data were sent by two transmitters at a frequency of 922 MHz and a rate of 1 bit/s; the measurements were sent every 48 seconds. The transmitters were activated by the parachute deployment as soon as the outside pressure reached 0.6 standard atmospheres (61 kPa), which was thought to occur at the altitude about 26 kilometres (16 mi) above the surface of the planet. The signals were received by several stations, including the Jodrell Bank Observatory.

The capsule was equipped with a rechargeable battery with a capacity sufficient for 100 minutes of powering the measurement and transmitter systems. To avoid becoming discharged during the flight to Venus, the battery was kept charged using the solar panels of the carrier spacecraft. Before the launch, the entire Venera 4 station was sterilized to prevent possible biological contamination of Venus.

== Mission ==
Two nominally identical 4V-1 probes were launched in June 1967. The first probe, Venera 4, was launched on 12 June by a Molniya-M carrier rocket flying from the Baikonur Cosmodrome. A course correction was performed on 29 July when it was 12,000,000 kilometres (7,500,000 mi) away from Earth; otherwise, the probe would have missed Venus. Although two such corrections had been planned, the first one was accurate enough and therefore the second correction was canceled. On 18 October 1967, the spacecraft entered the Venusian atmosphere with an estimated landing place near 19°N 38°E. The second probe, Kosmos 167, was launched on 17 June but failed to depart low Earth orbit.

During entry into the Venusian atmosphere, the heat shield temperature rose to 11,000 °C (19,800 °F) and at one point the cabin deceleration reached 300 G. The descent lasted 93 minutes. The capsule deployed its parachute at an altitude of about 52 kilometres (32 mi), and started sending data on pressure, temperature and gas composition back to Earth. The temperature control kept the inside of the capsule at −8 °C (18 °F). The temperature at 52 kilometres (32 mi) was recorded as 33 °C (91 °F), and the pressure as less than 1 standard atmosphere (100 kPa). At the end of the 26 kilometres (16 mi) descent, the temperature reached 262 °C (504 °F) and pressure increased to 22 standard atmospheres (2,200 kPa), and the signal transmission terminated. The atmospheric composition was measured as 90–93% carbon dioxide, 0.4–0.8% oxygen, 7% nitrogen and 0.1–1.6% water vapor. This data was crucial to the Venera 7 design later on.

=== Radar altimeter ===
The altitude of the Venera probe relative to the surface was measured using a radar altimeter operating at 770 MHz. The altimeter had an integer ambiguity of 30 kilometres (19 mi): that is, the same radar signal would be given at an altitude of X, X plus 30 kilometres (19 mi), X plus 60 kilometres (37 mi), etc. (an effect known as "aliasing"). At the time the distance of the cloud tops above the surface was not known, and due to this ambiguity, the first radar return, now believed to be at an actual altitude of about 55 kilometres (34 mi), was initially misinterpreted as 26 kilometres (16 mi). Therefore, based on the misinterpreted radar results, the Soviet team initially announced the probe descended to the surface. This result was quickly dismissed as inconsistent with the planetary diameter measured by radar, and the pressure readings by the capsule were much lower than predicted by the recently developed models of the Venus atmosphere.

=== Analysis ===
The Venera 4 data was analyzed together with the data of the Mariner 5 probe, under a combined Soviet–American working group of COSPAR in 1969, an organization of early space cooperation, allowing a more complete drawing of the profile of the atmosphere of Venus.

== Achievements ==
For the first time, in situ analysis of the atmosphere of another planet was performed and the data sent back to Earth; the analysis included chemical composition, temperature, and pressure. The measured ratio of carbon dioxide to nitrogen of about 13 corrected the previous estimates so much (an inverse ratio was expected in some quarters) that some scientists contested the observations. The main station detected no radiation belts; relative to Earth, the measured magnetic field was 3000 times weaker, and the hydrogen corona was 1000 times less dense. No atomic oxygen was detected. All the data suggested that water, if it had been present, had leaked from the planet long before. This conclusion was unexpected considering the thick Venusian clouds. Because of the negligible humidity, the sugar lock system, employed on Venera 4 in case of a water landing, was abandoned in subsequent Venus probes.

The mission was considered a complete success, especially given several previous failures of Venera probes. Although the Venera 4 design did allow for data transmission after landing, the Venera 3–6 probes were not built to withstand the pressures at the Venusian surface. The first successful soft landing on Venus was achieved by Venera 7 in 1970.

The people at program had realized that instead of a smoother, faster descent through the atmosphere like on Earth, the probe hit the atmosphere at incredible speeds yet quickly slowed to about 18kph (11.2mph) in mere seconds. This combined with knowledge learned on Venera 4 (22 bar atmosphere) meant that they had no time to waste once descent into Venus began. This realization paved the way for Venera 5, 6, etc.

== See also ==
- List of missions to Venus

== Cited sources ==
- Siddiqi, Asif A. (2018). Beyond Earth: A Chronicle of Deep Space Exploration, 1958–2016 (PDF). The NASA history series (second ed.). Washington, D.C.: NASA. ISBN 9781626830424. LCCN 2017059404. SP2018-4041.
- Ulivi, Paolo; Harland, David Michael (2007). Robotic Exploration of the Solar System: The golden age 1957–1982. Springer. ISBN 978-0-387-49326-8.
