= Jeanne Dumée =

French astronomer

- Born: 1660; Paris, France
- Died: 1706 (aged 45–46)
- Occupation: Astronomer

Jeanne Dumée (1660 in Paris – 1706) was a French astronomer and the author of an astronomical text, Entretiens sur l’opinion de Copernic touchant la mobilité de la terre (Conversations on Copernicus’ Opinion on the Movement of the Earth).

Dumée, born in Paris, was interested in astronomy since childhood. She married young and became a widow at age 17, when her husband died in battle in Germany at the head of a company he commanded. She was also known for her feminism, as she supported the idea that women were just as smart and useful in the science world as men were.

== Education ==
While not much is known about her childhood or education, many of the women of her age were educated by their parents at home, by private tutors or even by their husbands after they were married depending on the situation that they were in. "In the case of Maria Cunitz, she was educated by her father at home. She studied languages, classics, science, and the arts. Then she married a physician and amateur astronomer. Soon she was the primary astronomer in the family. At thirty, she published a set of astronomical tables." The situation for Jeanne Dumée may have been a similar one. She may have been educated in all of the necessary fields at her home and then gone on to become the primary astronomer of her household once her husband had died. She was known for her published work, Entretiens sur l’opinion de Copernic touchant la mobilité de la terre, as well as her feminist ideas that she had inserted into her publication.

== Family life ==
Similar to her education, not much is known about her family life save for the fact that she was married at a fairly young age and then widowed at the age of seventeen when her husband was killed in battle in Germany at the head of a company that he commanded. This did not deter her from her studies, however, as she went on to become a published author and famed astronomer. Family life in France during her lifetime, however, was very conservative. Men were typically the heads of the households, with the women either staying at home or needing their husbands’ permission before going out to work. Family life in many cultures during this time period involved an extended family living together under one roof, meaning the married couple and either the bride or the groom's parents and then whatever children the bride and the groom had. Up to four generations could live together in one household. It is not known if this was the situation that Jeanne Dumée found herself in before the death of her husband, but this is the situation that was common for most women and families of the time period.

== Career and similarities to other women ==
Dumée was an astronomer with a background and training in mathematics and other sciences. While not much is known about her career aside from the publishing of her book, Entretiens sur l’opinion de Copernic touchant la mobilité de la terre, much can be said about the other female astronomers of her age with whom she shared some similarities. For example, Maria Cunitz from Germany was a published author as well as an astronomer, and was incredibly famous for her works in her field. She wrote Urania propitia in which she provided new ephemera, a more “elegant” solution to Kepler’s problem, and new tables. The Cunitz crater on Venus is named after her. Another example would be Maria Clara EImmart who was an astronomer during the late 17th century. She was known for her astronomical illustrations. Between 1693 and 1698, she made an excess of 350 drawings of the moon phases on blue paper. The collection was called Micrographia stellarum phases lunae ultra 300. These women, like Dumée, were both published and famed in their field of work and were known for their love of astronomy.

== Written work ==
Dumée was the author of Entretiens sur l’opinion de Copernic touchant la mobilité de la terre (Conversations on Copernicus’ Opinion on the Movement of the Earth), written in 1680. Her work explains the Copernican system. The manuscript supported Copernican and Galilean theories on earth's movement, and the purpose of her writing was to discuss the reasons Copernicus himself used to defend his doctrines. She also wrote on her observations of Venus and moons of Jupiter, which proved Copernicus and Galileo's theories. The book was never published in its entirety, but is known through an epitome in the Journal des sçavans. It was critically acclaimed and praised for its clarity. She wrote during a time when famous astronomers were objects of violent and passionate attacks from several scientists.

In her writing, Dumée included an apology for writing on a subject that was considered, at the time, "too delicate work for persons of her sex." She wrote that women of her time considered themselves incapable of study, and explained that she hoped her own example would convince them that there is no difference between the brain of a woman and that of a man.

== Feminism ==
Jeanne Dumée's expressed her feminist views during the time period in which she lived, as well as her hopes for women in her field of study as well as many others, as she believed that women were just as capable of making scientific studies, research, and change just as well as any man. She believed that women were not lesser than men in any fashion, especially when it came to getting an education and making a name for themselves, and this sentiment was fairly clearly noted in her writing to women in her text.

== Gender inequality ==
During Dumée's lifetime, there was quite a bit of gender inequality, especially in her field. Men dominated the field of astronomy and Dumée had been told that the work involved in astronomy was "too delicate work for persons of her sex.” As previously stated, despite this, she was not deterred from her work or study, and she went on to publish her book and become famous for her work's clarity on the subject matter within its pages.

== See also ==
- Timeline of women in science

== Bibliography ==
- Aubin, David (2016). Jeanne Dumée as Astronomer and Woman in Seventeenth-Century France: The Myth and Her Lost Voice. Journal for the History of Astronomy, 2016, Vol. 47(3) 231-255 (DOI: 10.1177/0021828616660049).
- Oglive, Marilyn Bailey (1986). Women in science: antiquity through the nineteenth century: a biographical dictionary with annotated bibliography. Cambridge, Massachusetts: MIT Press.
- Tooke, William (1789). A new and general biographical dictionary: containing an historical and critical account of the lives and writings of the most eminent persons in every nation; particularly the British and Irish; from the earliest accounts of time to the present period. G. G. and J. Robinson.
- Lienhard, John H. "No. 407: Women in Astronomy." No. 407: Women in Astronomy. Accessed April 29, 2016. http://www.uh.edu/engines/epi407.htm.
- "European Life in the Eighteenth Century - Family Life and Education." European Life in the Eighteenth. Accessed April 29, 2016. http://www.historydoctor.net/Advanced Placement European History/Notes/european_life_in_the_eighteenth_century_family_life.htm.
- "The International Astronomical Union Minor Planet Center." Discovery Circumstances: Numbered Minor Planets (10001)-(15000). Accessed April 29, 2016. http://www.minorplanetcenter.net/iau/lists/NumberedMPs010001.html.
- Schiebinger, Londa (1991). The mind has no sex?: women in the origins of modern science (1st Harvard pbk. ed.). Cambridge, Massachusetts: Harvard University Press.
- Caminer Turra, Elisabetta (2003). Selected writings of an eighteenth-century Venetian woman of letters. Edited and Translated by Catherine M. Sama. Chicago: University of Chicago Press.
- "« Entretien Sur L'opinion De Copernic Touchant La Mobilité De La Terre », Dédié Au Chancelier Boucherat, Par Jeanne DUMEE, De Paris." Gallica. Accessed April 29, 2016. http://gallica.bnf.fr/ark:/12148/btv1b9062028n/f5.image.
- Noble, David F. (1992). A world without women: the Christian clerical culture of Western science (1. ed.). New York: Knopf.
- Finot, Jean (1913). Problems of the sexes. New York and London: G. P. Putnam's sons.
