= Urania Propitia =

1650 book of astronomical tables by Maria Cunitz

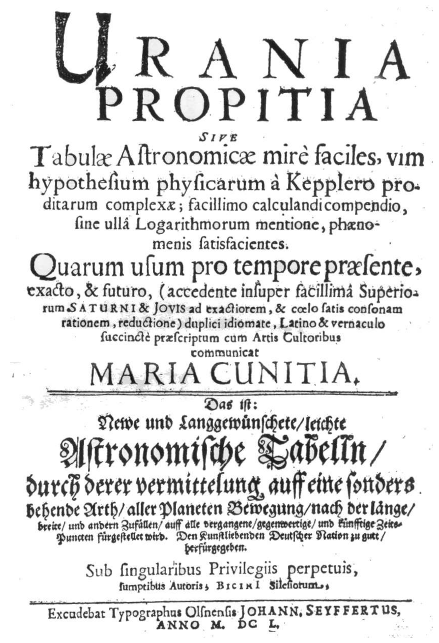
The title page of the Urania Propitia by Maria Cunitz (1650)

Urania Propitia (lit. 'kind/beneficent Urania') is a book of astronomical tables written by the Silesian astronomer Maria Cunitz and published in 1650. As Maria Cunitz was the daughter of both a physician and mathematician, it was her ability to grasp complex mathematics quickly and transcribe her findings as a polyglot that allowed her to do what few women had done before her.

The work served as a simplification of the Rudolphine Tables (1627) by Johannes Kepler, with Cunitz attempting to both increase the accuracy and to simplify the calculations from the original work. While she corrected a number of Kepler's computational errors, her equations also include inaccuracies. Cunitz's work is credited with making astrological tables accessible outside of the era's universities. Cunitz's cosmology combined elements from the cosmologies of both Kepler and Tycho Brahe. Like Brahe, she thought that the Sun and the Moon orbit around the planet Earth, while the rest of the planets in the Solar System orbit around the Sun. In her work, the physics within the cosmos involve ellipticals and aphelions.

== Introduction ==
Urania Propitia was a simplification of the Rudolphine Tables written by Johannes Kepler in 1627. Kepler's dedication to Emperor Ferdinand II which was originally dedicated to Rudolf II was filled with complex and tedious logarithms. Cunitz found many errors within the Rudolphine Tables. The simplifications to these tables were published as the Urania Propitia. In Urania Propitia, Cunitz removed logarithms from Kepler's work, which increased the accuracy and simplified the calculations from the Rudolphine Tables. Cunitz omitted some coefficients from her equations, leading to inaccuracies within her work. Astronomical tables of the time all contained computational errors, so despite these errors, Urania Propitia is seen as more accurate than Kepler’s work. The tables are mostly astrological, but the instructions are completely astronomical.

Urania Propitia was published in Latin and German. The German publication is credited as a source that led to establishing German as a scientific language. The publishing of Urania Propitia is credited with making astrological tables more accessible outside of universities.

Beyond the instructions, Maria Cunitz's book is split into three parts.

=== Part 1: Tables for spherical astronomy ===
The first part is the mathematical starting point. These include "sexagesimal sines, solutions of small right triangles in minutes and seconds, and tables for spherical astronomy for degrees of the ecliptic of: declination, right ascension, oblique ascension for latitudes 0 degrees to 72 degrees at 2 degree intervals..."

=== Part 2: Tables of average motions ===
It is the second part that the heart of Maria Cunitz's simplification is brought forward. Using the geometry and spherical astronomy from part one, Cunitz brings the rotational motions of the planets and moons into light using various mathematical formulas. One of the formulas from the Rudolphine Tables,

$$M = E - e  \sin E$$

where e, M and E denote the orbital eccentricity, the mean anomaly and the eccentric anomaly. This equation is known as "Kepler's equation" which normally has no "geometrical or algebraic solution for E." However, when M is given it becomes more possible to but find "E from M to any degree of precision by iteration or interpolation." The major accomplishment Cunitz brought was the ability to compute $\upsilon$ (the true anomaly) from M without the necessity to use "E as a coefficient of interpolation". Thus, Cunitz was able to simplify the Rudolphine Tables and determine the position of a planet in its orbit as a function of time.

=== Part 3: Tables for computation of eclipses ===
These tables were used for both the location of eclipses and the time of eclipses. This includes the use of the "golden astronomical number", the parallax of the moon and sun in a variety in longitude, latitude, altitude, etc..., and a catalog of other fixed stars in the universe.

== Cosmology ==
Cunitz's cosmology has variations of both Tycho Brahe and Johannes Kepler. While the basic structure of her cosmology is like Tycho's with the Sun and Moon orbiting around the Earth while the rest of the planets orbit around the Sun, the physics within the cosmos involves ellipticals and "aphelions."

== Historical significance ==
Beyond the rewards that came from a simplification of the Rudolphine Tables, a scientific advance written by a woman in the seventeenth century was an accomplishment in itself. It was described by Noel Swerdlow as "the earliest surviving scientific work by a woman on the highest technical level of its age." It was common for male scientists before Maria Cunitz to attribute their discoveries to muses. For Urania Propitia, Urania in Greek mythology was the muse of astronomy, and propitia is "favoring" or "beneficent" in Latin. This suggests that Maria Cunitz both saw Urania as her muse while also making strides for women as scientists, because she could be so easily compared to the ancient Greek astronomer.

Urania Propitia was privately published and as of 2016 there are nine physical copies in the world along with multiple online copies. Physical copies can be found in the Library of the Astronomical Observatory of Paris, Library of the University of Florida, in the exhibit of Galileo and Kepler at the University Libraries of Norman, Oklahoma, and Bloomington Lilly Library of Indiana University. Prior to June 10, 2004 the first edition of Urania Propitia was located at the Library of the Earls of Macclesfield in Shirburn Castle: Part 2 Science A-C section. The book was sold at the Sotheby's auction house for $19,827 USD.
