= Maria Cunitz =

German astronomer (1610–1664)

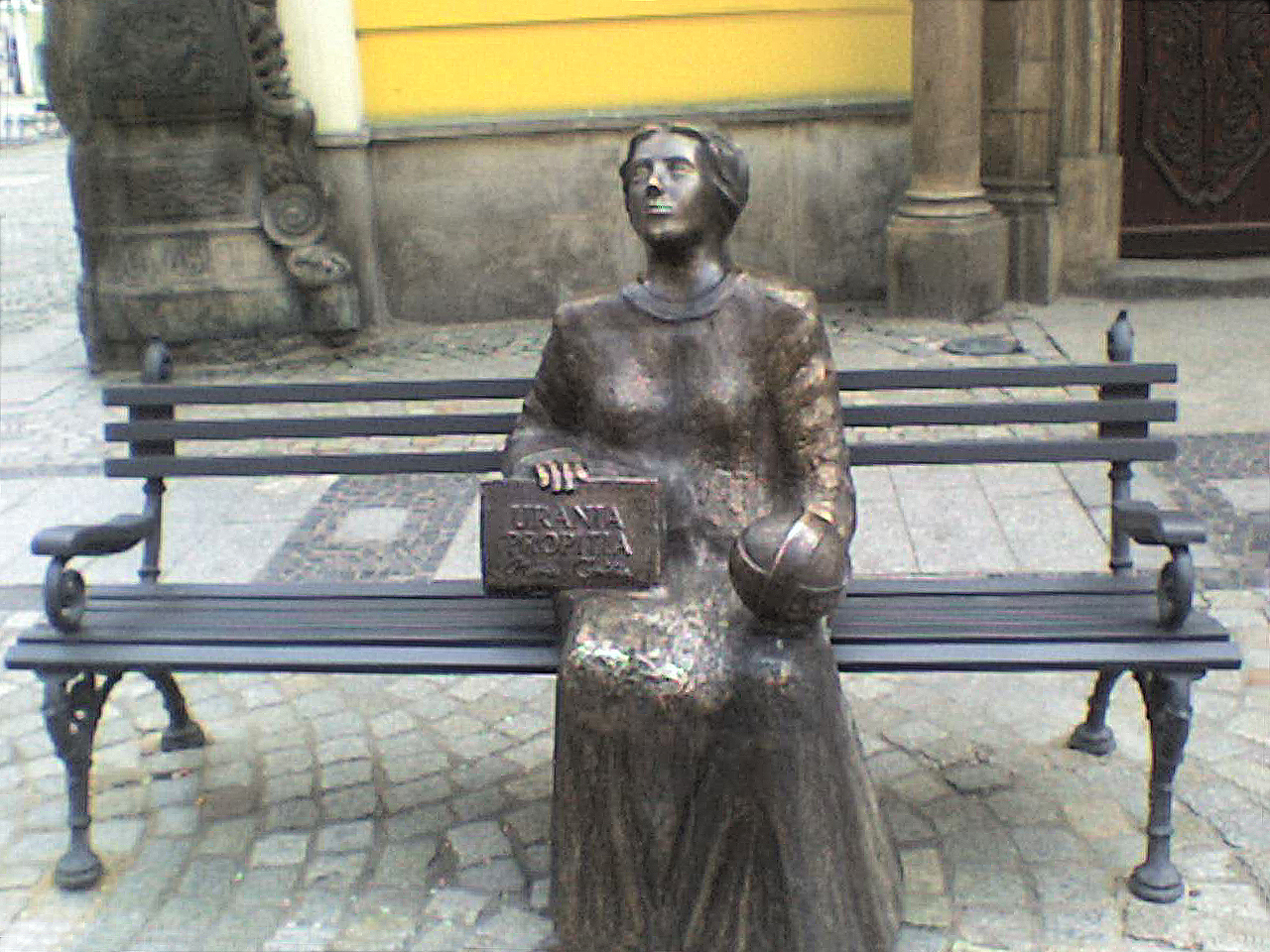
- A memorial to Maria Cunitz in Świdnica, Poland
- Born: 1610; Wohlau, Duchy of Legnica, Holy Roman Empire
- Died: 22 August, 1664 (aged 53–54); Pitschen, Duchy of Legnica, Holy Roman Empire
- Known for: Urania propitia
- Spouses: David von Gerstmann (m. 1623) Elias von Löwen (m. 1630)
- Children: 3
- Scientific career
- Fields: Astronomy, mathematics
- Academic advisors: Elias von Löwen

Maria Cunitz or Maria Cunitia (other versions of surname include: Cunicia, Cunitzin, Kunic, Cunitiae, Kunicia, Kunicka; 1610 – 22 August 1664) was an accomplished Silesian astronomer, and the most notable female astronomer of the early modern era. She authored a book Urania propitia, in which she provided new tables, new ephemera, and a simpler working solution to Kepler's second law for determining the position of a planet on its elliptical path. The Cunitz crater on Venus is named after her. The minor planet 12624 Mariacunitia is named in her honour.

== Life ==
=== Birth place and family ===
Maria Cunitz was born in Wohlau (now Wołów, Poland), as the eldest daughter of a Baltic German, Heinrich Cunitz, a physician and landowner who had lived in Schweidnitz for most of his life, and Maria Scholtz from Liegnitz, daughter of the German scientist Anton von Scholtz (1560–1622), a mathematician and counselor to Duke Joachim Frederick of Liegnitz.

=== Sources on her year of birth ===
The year of Maria's birth is uncertain. No birth, baptism or similar documents have ever been located. The year was speculated about in the first major German-language publication about Maria Cunitz of 1798. Paul Knötel appears to be the first to give the year 1604 as the year of Maria's birth. This date is estimated to be accurate since her parents married the previous year. Other authors later appear to have repeated the same year. The proof that Maria was actually born in 1610 is furnished by an anthology with congratulation poems on her first wedding, in connection with a letter of Elias A Leonibus to Johannes Hevelius from the year 1651, noted by Ingrid Guentherodt. Full details concerning the family of Maria Cunitz have been published by Klaus Liwowsky.

=== Marriages and interest in science ===
The family eventually moved to Schweidnitz in Lower Silesia (today Świdnica, Poland). At an early age of 13, Maria married (in 1623) the lawyer David von Gerstmann. After his death in 1626, she married (in 1630) Elias von Löwen, also from Silesia. Elias von Lowen was also known as Elie de Loewen. He was a physician at Pitschen and studied astronomy. Elias von Lowen was Maria's tutor and encouraged Maria to pursue astronomy before their marriage in 1630.

Together they made observation of the planet Venus on 14 December 1627 and Jupiter in April 1628. Other areas of study that Maria was proficient in included medicine, poetry, painting, music, mathematics, ancient languages, and history. Elias and Maria had three sons: Elias Theodor, Anton Heinrich and Franz Ludwig.

=== War refugee in the Thirty Years' War ===
During the outbreak of the Thirty Years' War from 1618 to 1648 Maria and Elias von Löwen took refuge in the Cistercians convent of Olobok, Poland. They were of Protestant religion; her siblings, who stayed in Silesia, converted to Roman Catholicism. During the time Maria and Elias took refuge, Maria used her time to arrange a set of astronomical tables that were based on the Rudolphine Tables, which were written by Johannes Kepler.

Cunitz expanded her astronomical tables to include all of the planets at any moment in time. At the end of the Thirty Years' War, the couple returned to their home at Pitschen in Silesia.

=== Self-published writer ===
In 1650, Maria self-published on her own expense Urania propitia in German and Latin as a dedication to Holy Roman Emperor Ferdinand III. Urania propitia was a simplification of Kepler's Rudolphine Tables due to their difficulty of producing calculations and applications, because the use of logarithms.

== Urania propitia ==
Urania propitia is one of the most well known and influential works created by Cunitz. Her cosmology, as exemplified in this work, was a variation of other great, early astronomers such as Tycho Brahe and Johannes Kepler. Urania propitia is a "large quarto with a large number of pages of tables that allows people to determine both the longitude and latitude of each of the planets, also along with other parameters." In this text she revised the complicated and errored calculations found in Kepler's Rudolphine Tables by creating simpler algorithms that reduced the room for human and mathematical error. However, Cunitz did omit small coefficients, leading to minimal errors in Urania propitia. Urania propitia was published in both Latin and German in order to increases its accessibility.

Elias von Lowen, Maria's second husband, created the preface to Urania propitia. Elias wanted to make sure the reader of Urania propitia knew that the entirety of this work was exclusively Maria's own work. Elias also wanted to note that he had no part in writing Urania propitia, but he wanted to make clear the fact that he continuously supported his wife Maria.

Urania propitia provided new tables, new ephemera, and a more elegant solution to Kepler's Problem, which is to determine the position of a planet in its orbit as a function of time. Today, her book is also credited for its contribution to the development of the German scientific language.

Urania propitia did not have much of an impact on late 17th-century astronomy. A large contribution to this fact has to do with Cunitz publishing her work in an isolated printing establishment in Olesnica, and there were only a few copies of the Urania propitia made. No one really mentioned Urania propitia, except a mid-century Parisian astronomer named Ismael Boulliau. However, Boulliau "only commented on the Urania propitia and thought his work was better and more accurate than Cunitz's work."

Urania is the Greek mythological muse of Astronomy while propitia is translated from Latin to "beneficent." This title follows the common theme of attributing a scientific success to a female muse, but also recognizes the connection between the muse and its female author. This statement title in early 17th century Germany, a time where recognized and accepted women scientists were few and far between, was a groundbreaking text that exemplified the abilities of women in science.

== Education ==
Maria's father was Heinrich Cunitz,a well renowned and knowledgeable physician. Her mother, Maria Scholtz, was the self-educated daughter of the German mathematician Anton Schultze. Although both of Maria's parents were well educated, Maria herself never had any formal education. Despite the negative connotation of teaching women about the natural sciences that often prevailed in 17th century Germany, Heinrich and Mary educated Maria in a multitude of subjects, including mathematics, medicine, history, and the fine arts. Maria could speak in seven languages: German, Italian, French, Polish, Latin, Greek, and Hebrew.

One of Maria's tutors, Elias von Löven, a physician and amateur astrologist like her father, would later become her second husband. During their marriage Elias encouraged his wife's passion for astronomy and mathematics. He introduced her to various astronomists of the time, such as Johannes Hevelius of Danzig, Ismaël Boulliau, Pierre Desnoyers, Albrecht Portner, and Pierre Gassendi, who served as secretary to the Queen of Poland. However, the past limitations in the education and communication of women meant that Maria had to communicate with her fellow scholars under the name of her husband, Elias. Often the letters were filled with poetic fluff in order to maintain the common etiquette while in communication with one of the opposite sex.

Due to her many talents and accomplishments, Cunitz was called the "Silesian Pallas" by J.B. Delambre, who also compared her to Hypatia of Alexandria during his study of history in astronomy.

In 1727 the book Schlesiens Hoch- und Wohlgelehrtes Frauenzimmer, nebst unterschiedenen Poetinnen..., Johan Caspar Eberti wrote that

"(Maria) Cunicia or Cunitzin was the daughter of the famous Henrici Cunitii. She was a well-educated woman, like a queen among the Silesian womanhood. She was a dedicated astrologist and especially enjoyed astronomical problems".

== Legacy and recognition ==
Urania propitia had a lasting effect in the world of astronomy, inspiring her fellow astronomers and correspondents to eliminate errors and err on the side of simplicity when deriving calculations. However, a fire broke out in the streets of Byczyna, Poland and destroyed Maria Cunitz and her husband Elias von Löwen's house and her vast collection astronomy equipment, academic books and papers, and her detailed correspondence with relevant astronomers. Much of her work was lost. However, Urania propitia was privately published and as of 2016 there are nine physical copies in the world along with multiple online copies. Physical copies can be found in the Library of the Astronomical Observatory of Paris, Library of the University of Florida, in the exhibit of Galileo and Kepler at the University Libraries of Norman, Oklahoma, and Bloomington Lilly Library of Indiana University. Prior to 10 June 2004 the first edition of Urania propitia was located at The Library of The Earls of Macclesfield in the Shirburn Castle: Part 2 Science A-C section. The book was sold at the Sotheby's auction house for US$19,827.

In Świdnica, the town where Maria grew up, there is a monument of Cunitz. The monument is an iron bench with a bronze sculpture of Maria sitting on the bench with the Urania propitia in her right hand. Apparently, the monument of Maria in Świdnica, is the only known monument contributed to Cunitz.

=== Named after her ===
- Cunitz crater, a 48.6 kilometres (30.2 mi) in diameter crater on Venus is named after her. The name was approved by the International Astronomical Union in 1991.
- 12624 Mariacunitia, a main-belt asteroid discovered at the Palomar Observatory in 1960 is named in honor of her.

== Nationality ==
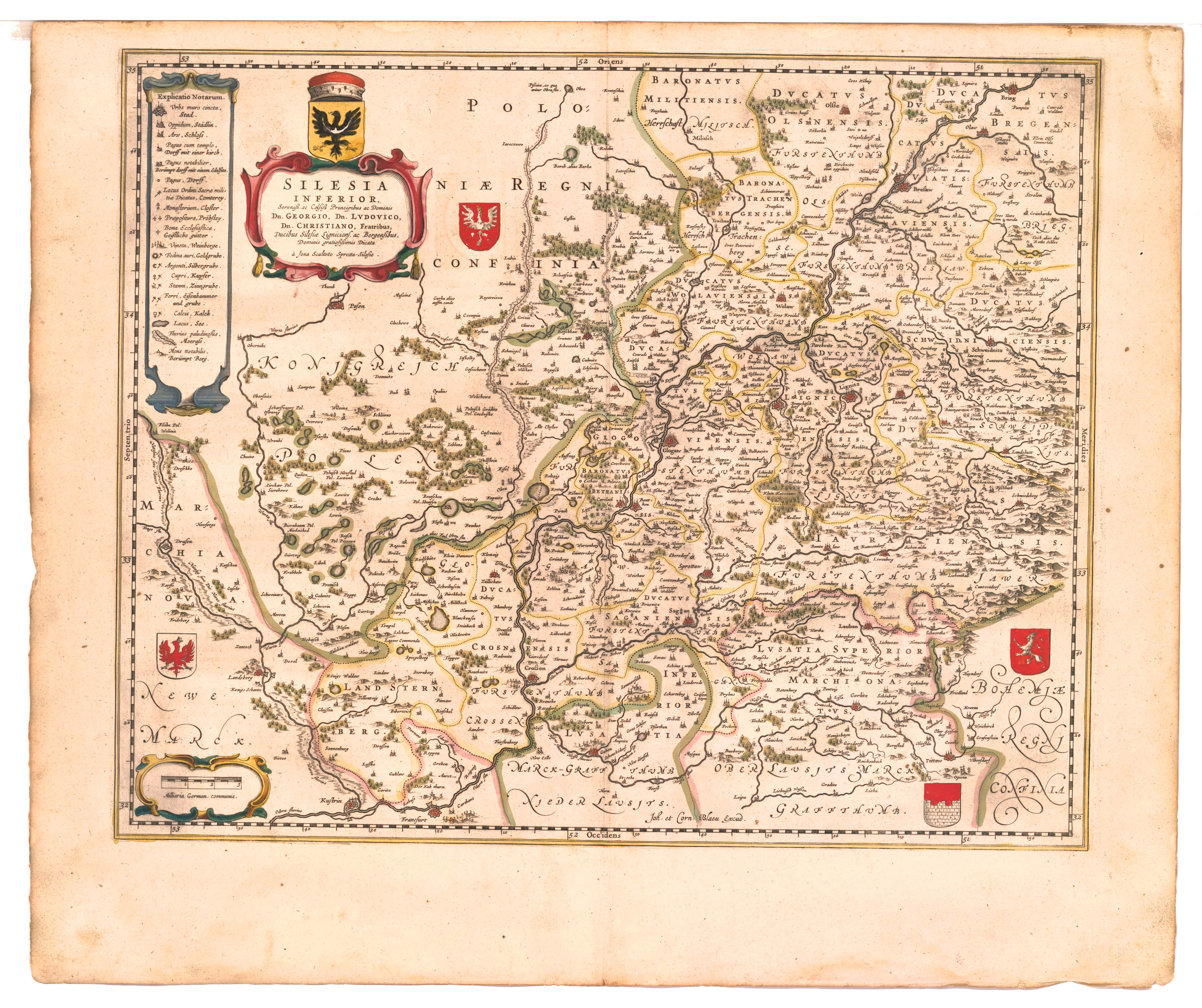
Map from 1645 showing places of Cunitz' life in Silesia like Wolaw, Lignitz and Schweidnitz. In those times both German and Slavic names were in use.

Maria Cunitz is usually characterized as Silesian, for example in the Encyclopædia Britannica Eleventh Edition of 1911. She was born and spent most of her life in the Holy Roman Empire, which included non-German minorities, ruled by the Austrian Habsburg monarchy. The fragment of Silesia in which Maria lived was part of Bohemia before 990, the united Poland between 990 and 1202 and part of Bohemia between 1038 and 1050. In 1202 the Polish seniorate was abolished and all Polish Duchies, including Silesia, became independent, although four Silesian dukes of the 13th century were rulers of Kraków and held the title Duke of Poland. In 1331 the region again became part of Bohemia. In 1742 it became part of Prussia and in 1871 the German Empire. About three centuries after Maria's lifetime it was reassigned to Poland after World War II.

During Maria's lifetime, nationality did not play as significant a role in determining person's identity as it does today. However, the birthplace of Maria Cunitz and the long reaching effects of the Thirty Years War did have a substantial effect on Maria's work. Her time in hiding helped to develop her simplification of the Rudolphine Tables. Nevertheless, multiple later sources felt the need to assign to Maria Cunitz a nationality relevant to their own time. She has mostly been described as German, for example in the Biographical Dictionary of Woman in Science. She published in German. She has been also described as Polish and some consider her to be the first Polish woman astronomer. Cunitz spoke not only German and Polish but also French, Greek, Italian, Latin and Hebrew.

== See also ==
- Timeline of women in science
