= Rudolphine Tables =

1627 catalogue of astronomical data by Johannes Kepler

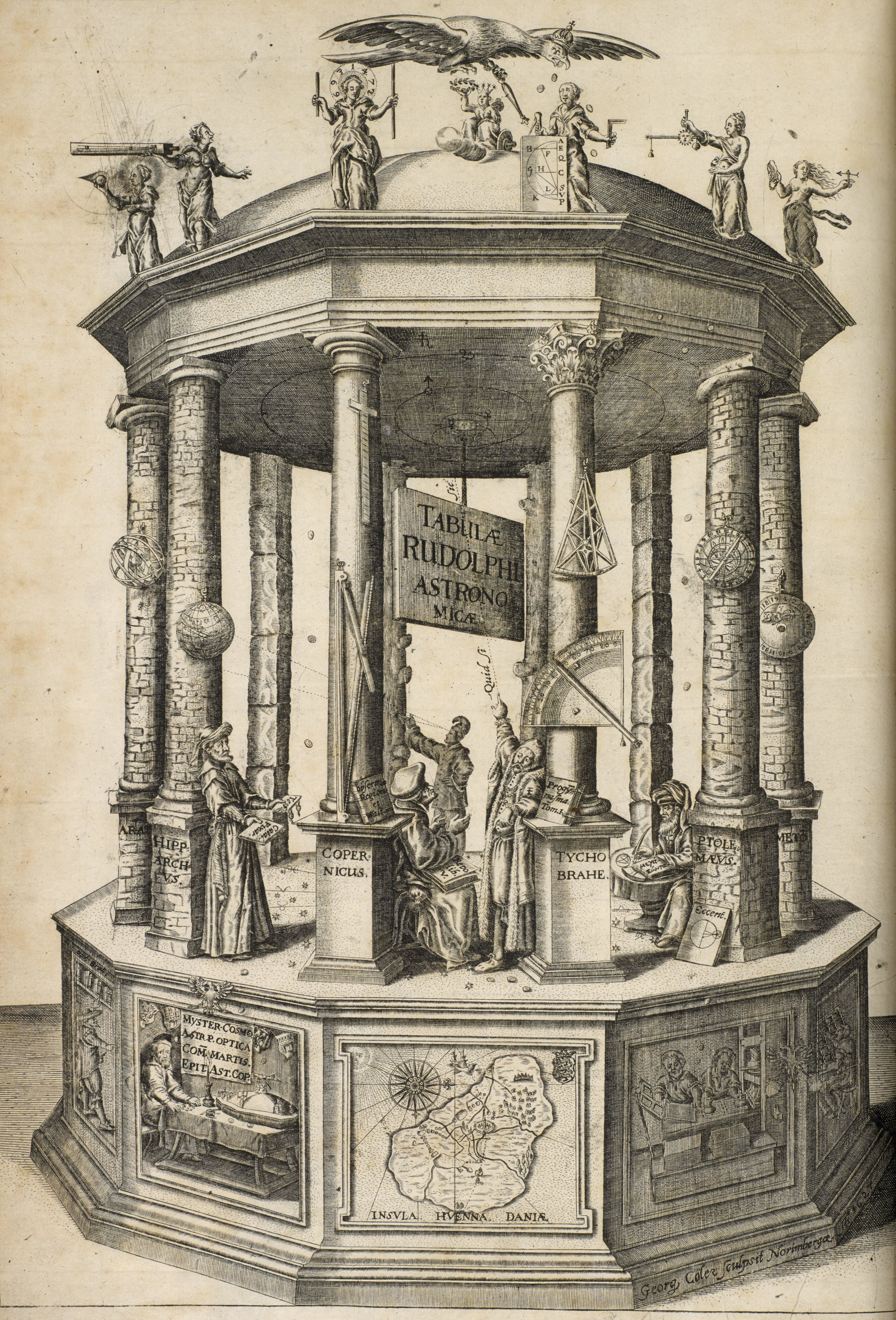
The frontispiece to the Rudolphine Tables celebrates the great astronomers of the past: Aratus, Hipparchus, Copernicus, Ptolemy, Meton, and most prominently, Tycho Brahe (beneath his standing figure, a map on the pedestal's central panel depicts the Hven Island, seat of Brahe's observatory Uranienborg).

The Rudolphine Tables (Latin: Tabulae Rudolphinae) consist of a star catalogue and planetary tables published by Johannes Kepler in 1627, using observational data collected by Tycho Brahe (1546–1601). The tables are named in memory of Rudolf II, Holy Roman Emperor, in whose employ Brahe and Kepler had begun work on the tables. The main purpose of the Rudolphine tables was to allow the computation of the positions of the then known five classical planets of the Solar System, and they were considerably more precise than earlier such tables.

== Previous tables ==
Star tables had been produced for many centuries and were used to establish the position of the planets relative to the fixed stars (particularly the twelve constellations used in astrology) on a specific date in order to construct horoscopes. Until the end of the 16th century, the most widely used had been the Alphonsine tables, first produced in the 13th century and regularly updated thereafter. These were based on a Ptolemaic, geocentric model of the Solar System. Although the Alphonsine tables were not very accurate, nothing else was available and so they continued to be used.

In 1551, following the publication of De revolutionibus orbium coelestium by Nicholas Copernicus, Erasmus Reinhold produced the Prutenic Tables based on a heliocentric model of the Solar System, but these were no more accurate than the earlier tables.

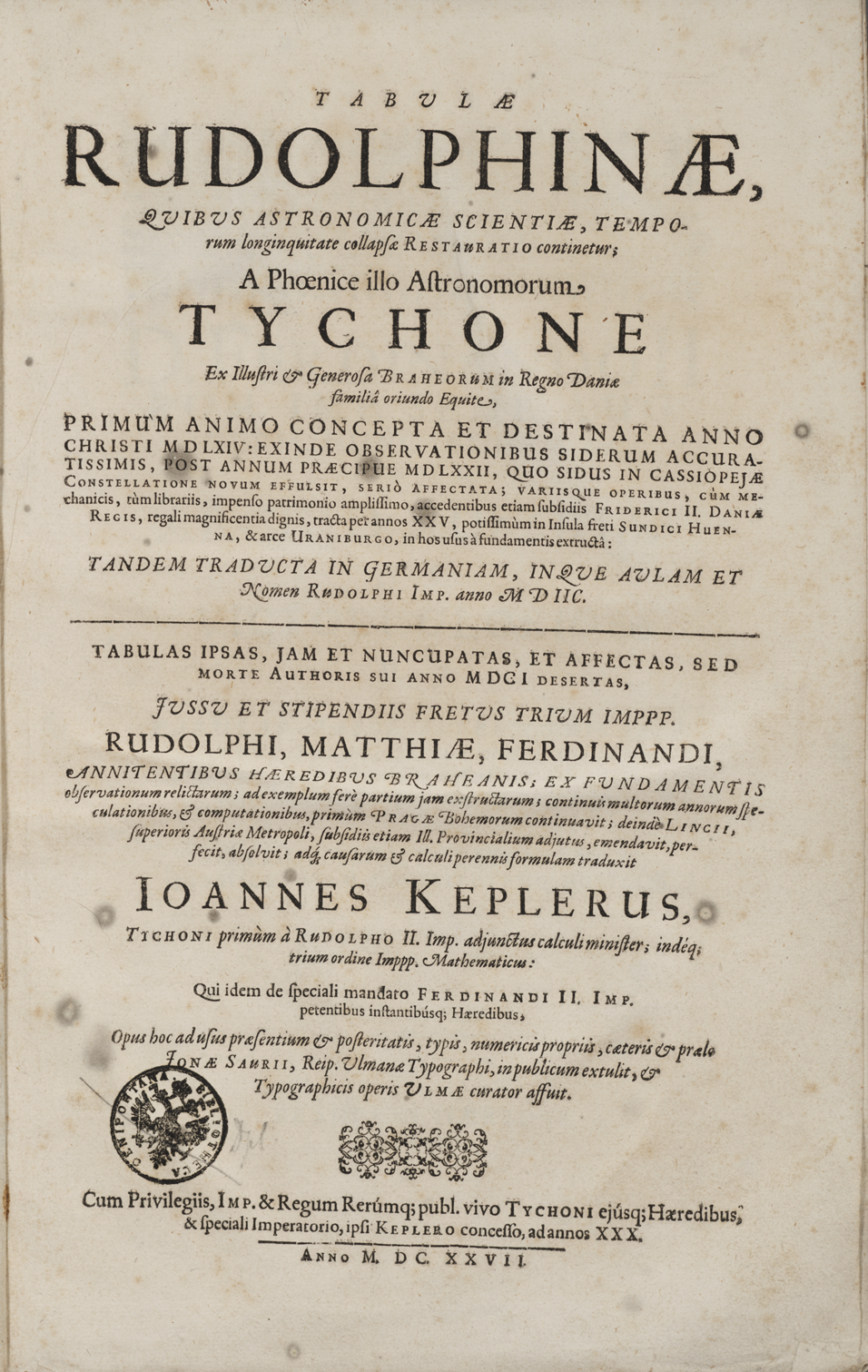
Title page. English translation by SourceLibrary.org , Amsterdam

== Observations and prelude ==
The observations underlying the Rudolphine tables were performed by Tycho Brahe and his team. Brahe's measurements were much more accurate than the ones available previously. He worked with elaborate instruments to determine the precise positions of planets and stars in the sky but did not have a telescope.

Brahe had been supported by the Danish king Frederick II and had built an observatory on the island of Hven during 1576–1596. When the king died, Brahe moved to Prague and became the official imperial astronomer of Emperor Rudolf II. There he was joined by Kepler in 1600, and Rudolf instructed them to publish the tables. While Tycho Brahe favored a geo-heliocentric model of the solar system in which the Sun and Moon revolve around the Earth and the planets revolve around the Sun, Kepler argued for a Copernican heliocentric model.

When Tycho Brahe died in 1601, Kepler became the official imperial mathematician. By studying Brahe's data, he found his three laws of planetary motion, which he published in 1609 and 1619. Emperor Rudolf died in 1612 and Kepler left Prague.

== Composition and publication ==
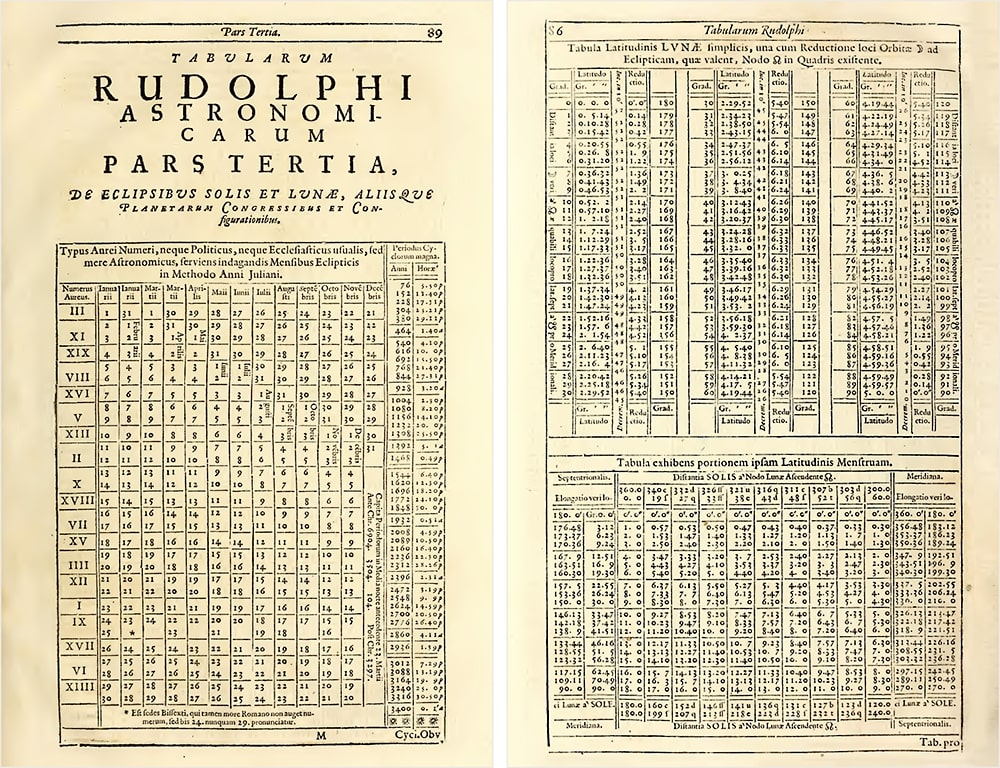
Two pages showing eclipses of the Sun and Moon

The tables were anticipated for many years, with pleas for its publication reaching as far as India and Jesuit missionaries in China. Apart from external hindrances, Kepler himself refrained from such a monumental enterprise involving endless tedious calculations. He wrote in a letter to a Venetian correspondent, impatiently inquiring after the tables: "I beseech thee, my friends, do not sentence me entirely to the treadmill of mathematical computations, and leave me time for philosophical speculations which are my only delight". They were finally completed near the end of 1623.

In his attempts to finance the printing of the tables, Kepler began by claiming the arrears due to him by Rudolph. From the Imperial Court in Vienna he was sent to three other towns to which the debt was transferred. After a year of roaming the country, he was eventually able to raise 2000 florins (out of 6299 owed to him), which sufficed to pay for the paper. He paid for the printing out of his own pocket. It was initially supposed to be printed in Linz, where he resided at the time, but the chaos of the Thirty Years' War (first the garrisoning of soldiers in the town, after which a siege of the revolting peasantry, which almost resulted in the burning of the manuscript) prompted him to leave. He began the enterprise anew in Ulm. There, after many quarrels with the printer Jonas Saur, the first edition of a thousand copies was completed in September 1627, in time for the annual book mart in the Frankfurt Fair.

While publishing the Rudolphine Tables, Kepler was hard-pressed to fight off Tycho's numerous relatives. During the publication process, these relatives repeatedly tried to obtain control of the observations and the profit from the publication of the tables.

Tycho had intended to dedicate the tables to Emperor Rudolf II, but by 1627, when the tables were published, Rudolf II had been dead for 15 years, so instead the tables were dedicated to Emperor Ferdinand II but are named after Rudolph II.

== Contents ==
The book, written in Latin, contains tables for the positions of the 1,005 stars measured by Tycho Brahe, and more than 400 stars from Ptolemy and Johann Bayer, with directions and tables for locating the moon and the planets of the Solar System. Included are function tables of logarithms (a useful computational tool that had been described in 1614 by John Napier) and antilogarithms, and instructive examples for computing planetary positions.

For most stars these tables were accurate to within one arc minute, and included corrective factors for atmospheric refraction.

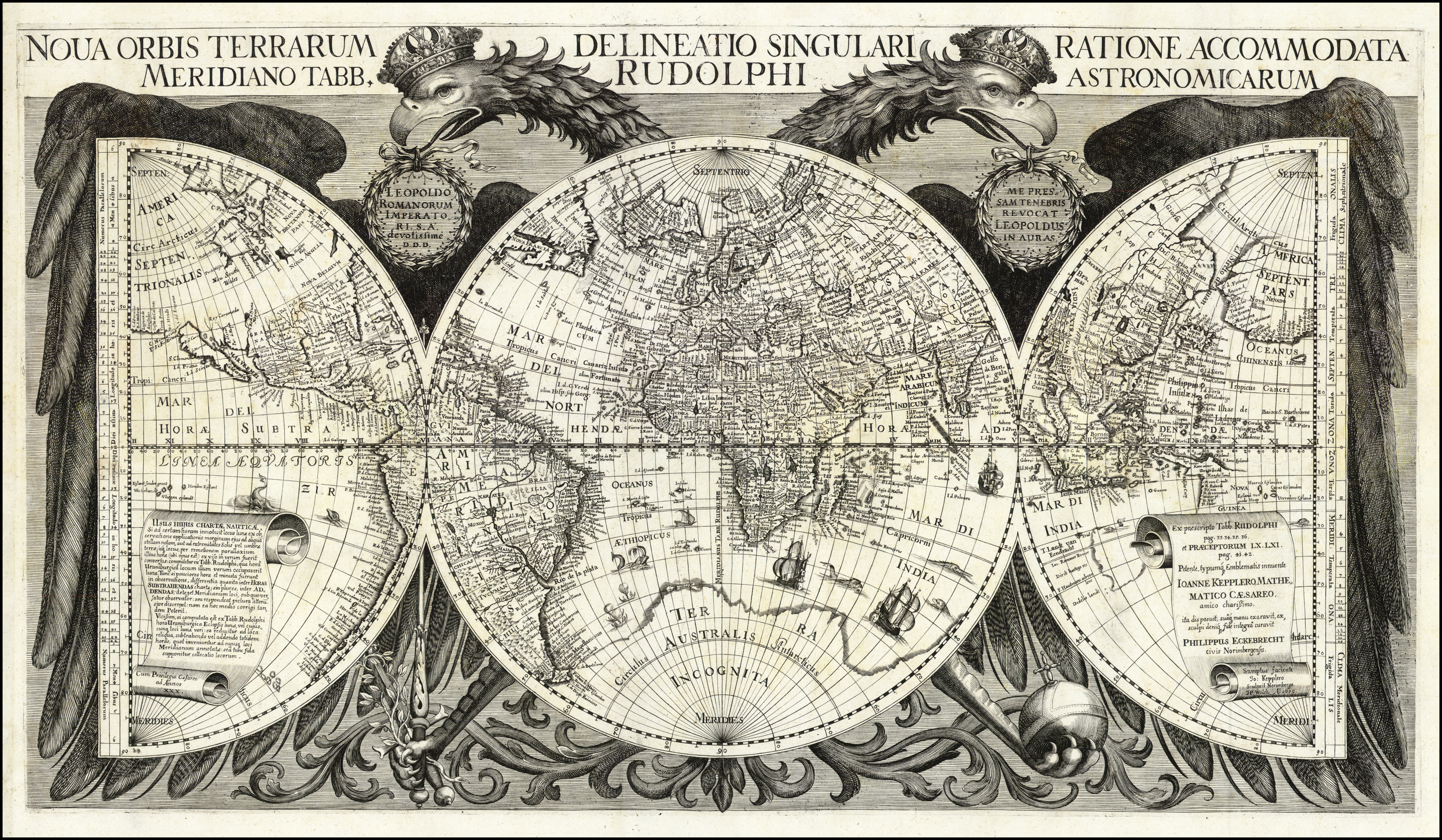
The map of the world from the Rudolphine Tables

A map of the world was also included. A scroll in the lower left panel of the map is inscribed with instructions on how to use the map and a lunar distance measurement to calculate longitude: it states that by observing the edge of the Moon's disc in relation to a known star, or a lunar eclipse, it is possible to calculate longitude at the point of observation by calculating local time and comparing it to the time stated in the tables. For this purpose, Kepler needed his map to be as up-to-date as possible, and it is remarkable for being one of the first to show the Dutch discoveries of the west coast of Australia, Eendracht Land and Dedels Land; this information was apparently taken from the Nova Totius Terrarum Orbis Geographica ac Hydrographica Tabula by Jodocus Hondius II, published in Amsterdam in 1625. Hondius derived his geographical knowledge of Australia from the unpublished 1622 map of the Indian Ocean by Hessel Gerritz. A time scale along the Equator on Kepler's map indicates the hours to be added or subtracted for determining longitude (one hour equals 15 degrees longitude).

== Use of the tables ==
The tables were sufficiently accurate to predict a transit of Mercury observed by Pierre Gassendi in 1631 and a transit of Venus observed by Jeremiah Horrox in 1639.

Adam Schall von Bell, a Jesuit in China, used the tables to complete a reform of the Chinese calendar in 1635.

== See also ==
- Ferdinand Verbiest - Astronomy contests
- Star cartography
- Urania Propitia

== Bibliography ==
- Koestler, Arthur (2014) [1959]. The Sleepwalkers. Penguin Classics. ISBN 9780141394534.
- Robert J. King, “Johannes Kepler and Australia”, The Globe, no.90, 2021, pp.15-24.
