= Gula Mons =

Volcano on Venus

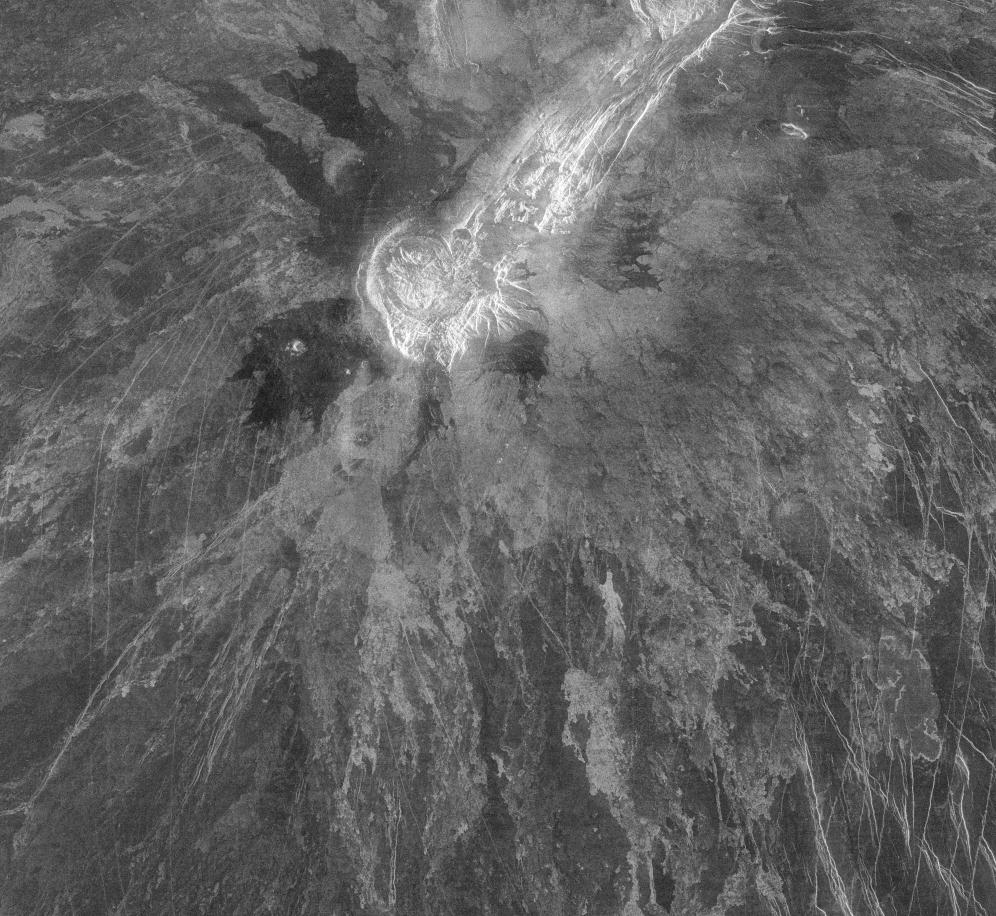
- Radar image of Gula Mons
- Feature type: Volcano
- Coordinates: 21.9°N 359.1°E
- Diameter: 276 km
- Eponym: Gula

Gula Mons is a volcano in western Eistla Regio on Venus; it is 3 kilometers (1.9 mi) high and located at approximately 22 degrees north latitude, 359 degrees east longitude. The name references the Babylonian earth mother or creative force.

== Topographic features ==
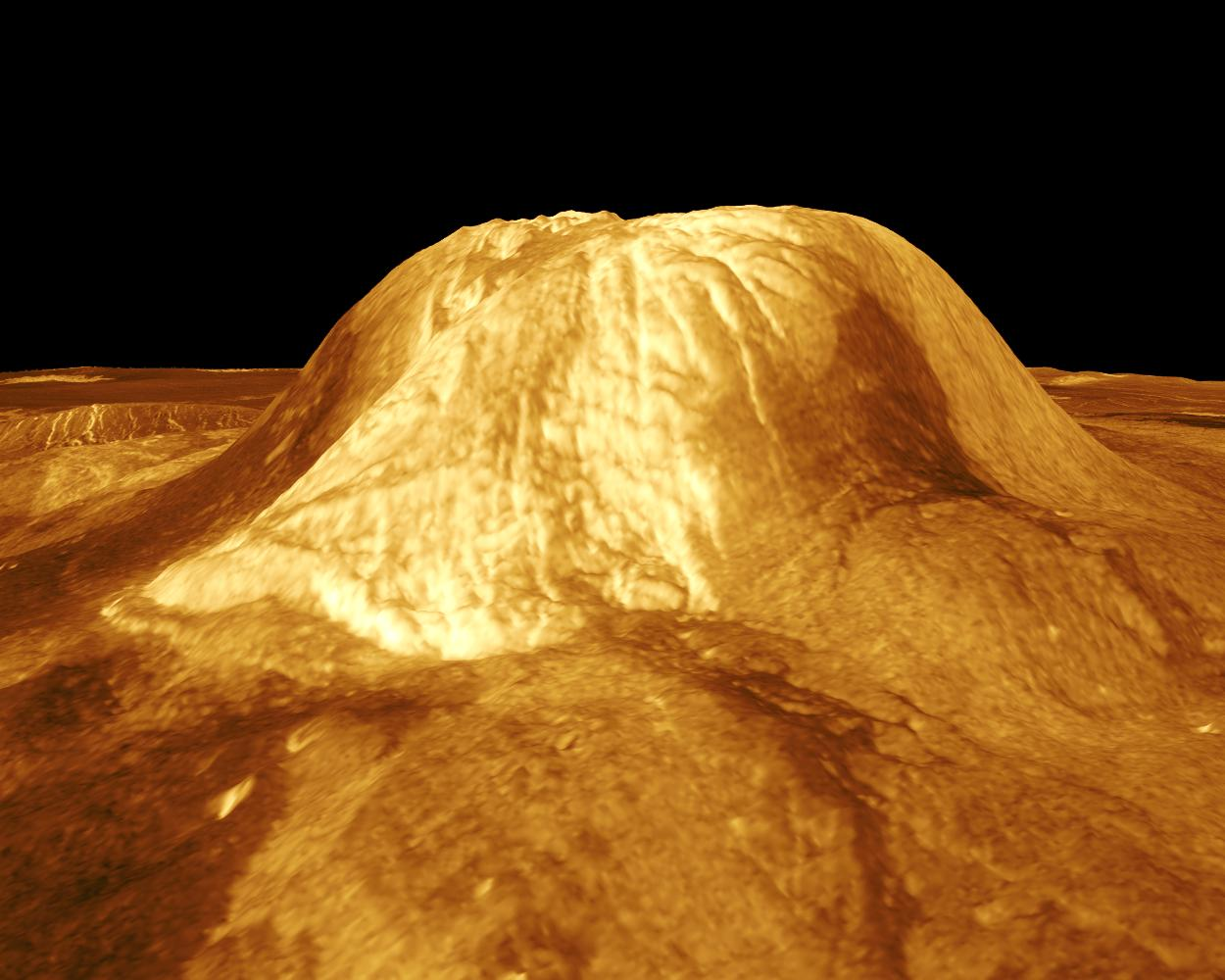
Computer-simulated view of Gula Mons

Its main feature is a NE-SW-oriented rift-like fracture set connecting two summit calderas. There is also a structure which links the northern caldera and ridge system to Idem Kuva corona located NW of Gula Mons. Radially spreading lava flows which have digitate and broad sheet-like forms extend from the summit, including radar-dark flows which overlay several older lava deposits. Radial and circumferential fractures are present on the flanks.
