= Eistla Regio =

Region of the planet Venus

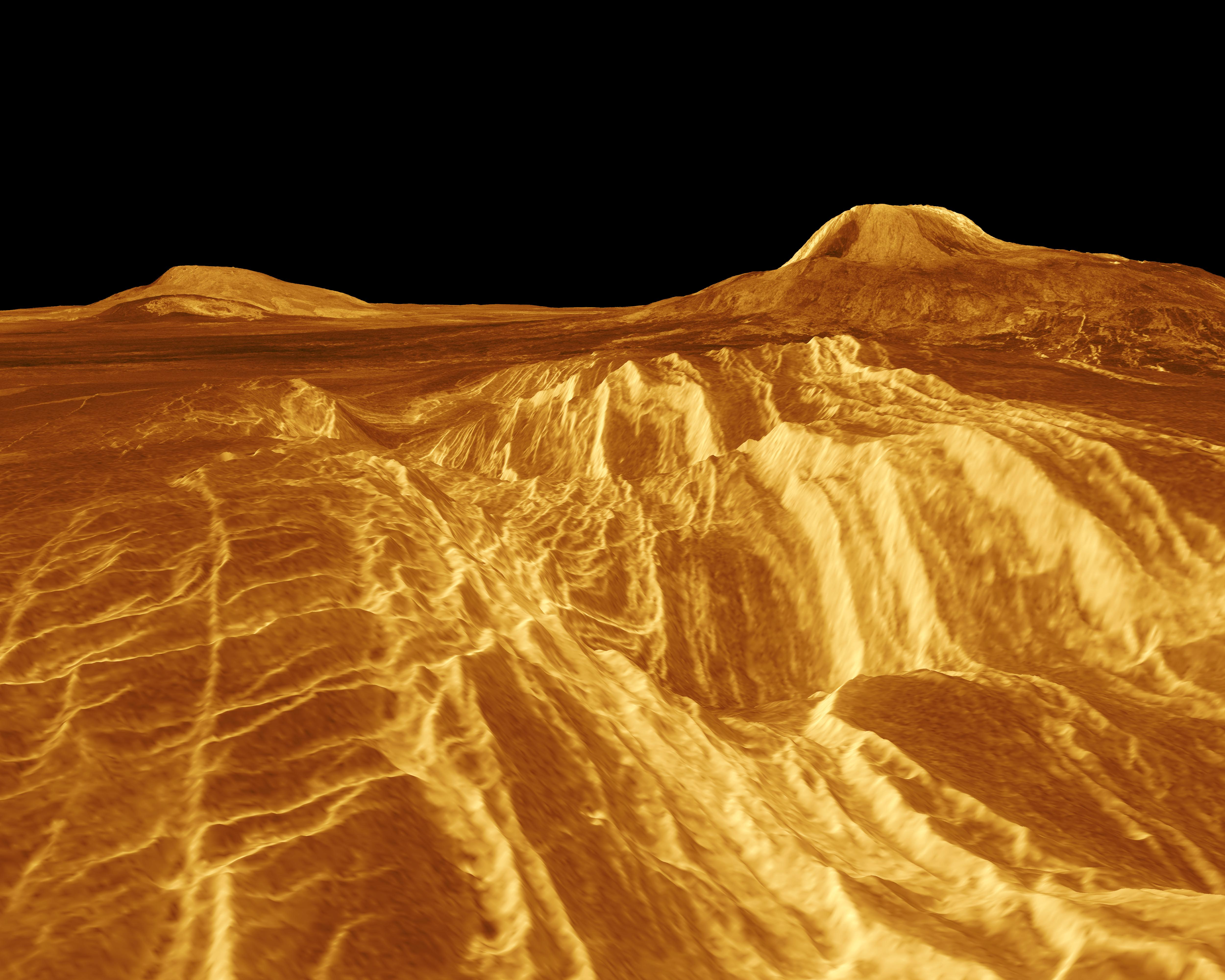
- A portion of western Eistla Regio is shown in this three-dimensional, computer-generated view of the surface of Venus.
- Feature type: Regio
- Location: Venus
- Diameter: 8015 km
- Eponym: Norse giantess.

Eistla Regio is an 8015 km diameter region on the surface of Venus, located between the Bereghinya Planitia, and the Tinatin Planitia, centered 10.5° North 21.5° East. It is the third largest rise in planform on Venus, after Aphrodite Terra and the Beta–Phoebe Regiones.

Its name derives from the Norse giantess. The name was accepted by the IAU in the year 1982. On Venus they are named after giantesses, and titanesses.

== Geography ==
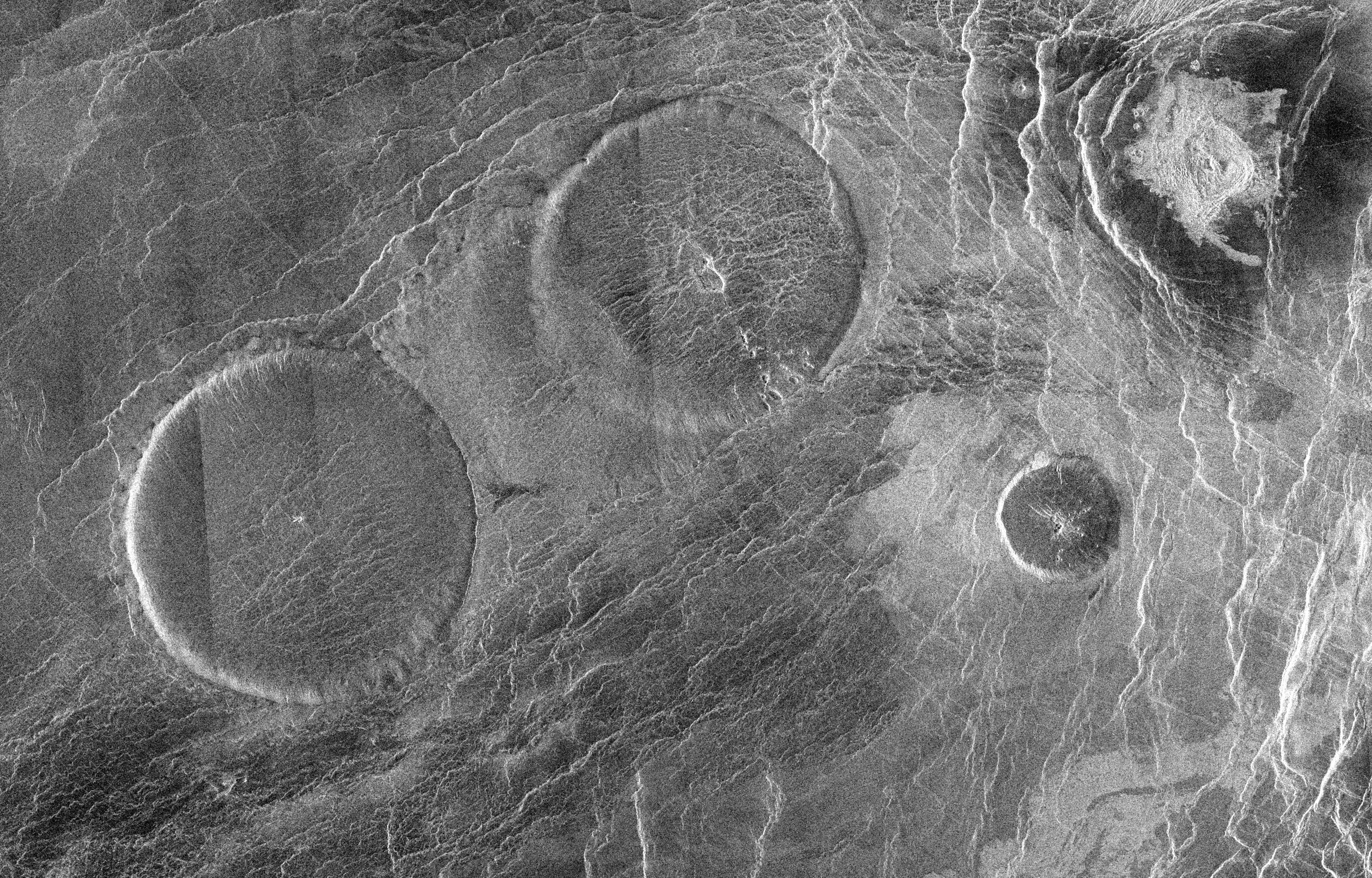
The pancake domes called Carmenta Farra.

In the western part of the region is a group of pancake domes named Carmenta Farra. They are 65 km in diameter, with broad flat tops less than 1 km in height.

At the western end of the region is the volcano Gula Mons. It is 3 kilometers (1.9 mi) high with a diameter of 276 km.

== Mapping ==
Eistla Regio is the first such rise viewed by the Magellan spacecraft. During the first mapping cycle, superior conjunction prevented the Magellan from bringing data back on the eastern side of the region.
