= Meni =

Meni is a Jewish given name. Notable people with the name include:

- Meni Koretski (born 1974), Israeli footballer and manager
- Meni Levi (born 1980), Israeli footballer
- Meni Mazuz (born 1955), Israeli jurist and Supreme Court justice

Other people called Meni:

- Meni, an ancient Egyptian high official and priest
- Menes, pharaoh of Egypt whose name is also spelled Meni

== See also ==
- Menis
