= Dendera temple complex =

Ancient Egyptian temple complex

Coordinates: 26°8′30″N 32°40′13″E

The Dendera temple complex (Ancient Egyptian: Iunet or Tantere; the 19th-century English spelling in most sources, including Belzoni, was Tentyra; also spelled Denderah) is located about 2.5 kilometres (1.6 miles) south-east of Dendera, Egypt. It is one of the best-preserved temple complexes of ancient Egypt. The area was used as the sixth nome of Upper Egypt, south of Abydos.

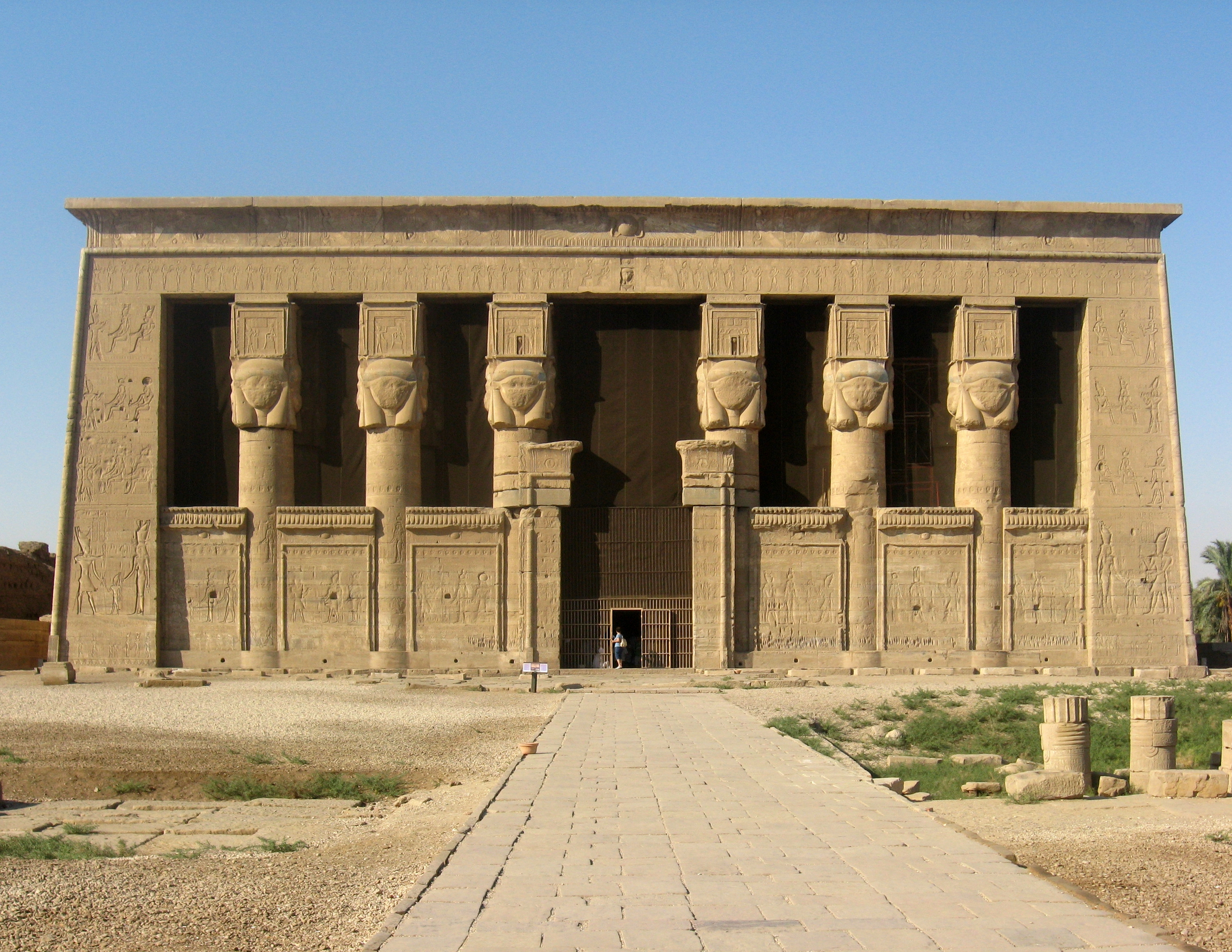
Temple of Hathor, Dendera

== Description ==
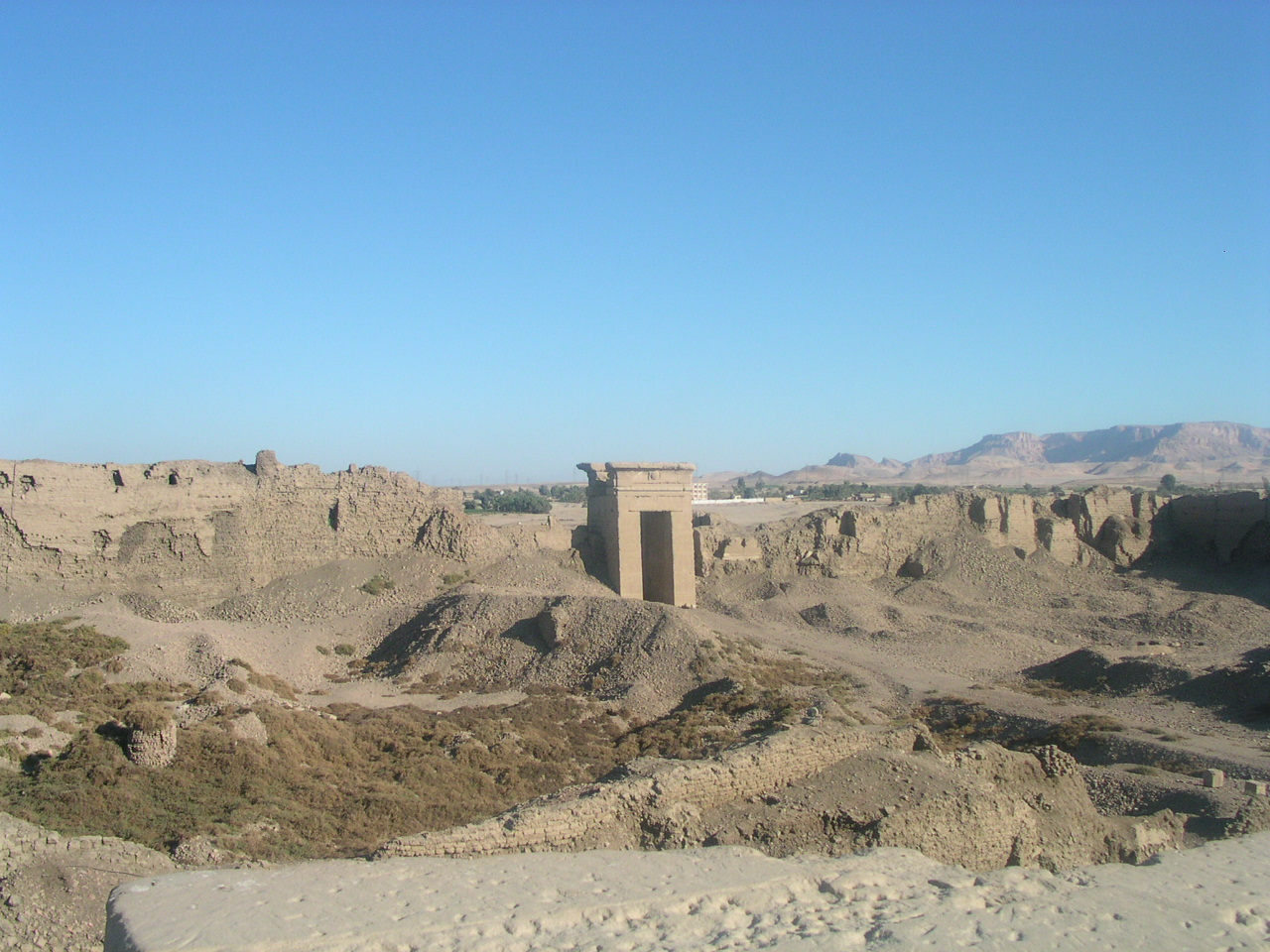
The compound's massive mudbrick walls, as seen from the temple roof

The entirety of the complex is surrounded by a sizable mudbrick wall. Dendera, an oasis on the banks of the Nile, was inhabited by thousands at its peak. Due to its massive size, the structures throughout the complex were constructed over many eras, such as the Middle Kingdom, the Ptolemaic Era, and the period characterized by Roman provincial rule. There is evidence that there was an even earlier building on this site, circa 2250 B.C.E., which could have begun during the reign of Pepi I and completed during the reign of his son, Merenre Nemtyemsaf I. Evidence also exists of a temple in the Eighteenth Dynasty (ca. 1500 BC). The earliest extant (surviving) building in the compound today is the mammisi raised by Nectanebo II – last of the native pharaohs (360–343 BC).

The features in the complex include:

- Hathor temple (the main temple)
- Temple of the birth of Isis
- Sacred Lake (source of water for sacred rituals and for everyday use)
- Sanatorium
  - This would have functioned similarly to a Roman bathhouse, but strictly for bathing and an overnight stay to manifest healing dreams. The waters at Dendera were sacred and were often used to bless the inscriptions on statues so that they could cure diseases.
- Mammisi of Nectanebo II
- Basilica
- Roman Mammisi
- a Barque shrine
  - (Def.: Boat; French, “barque”/ Late Latin “barca”)
  - Used as a resting place for the statues of the gods when outside of the temple during festivals
- Gateways of Domitian and Trajan
- the Roman Kiosk

The Dendera Temple is not to be confused with the Dendera Necropolis, which consists of a series of tombs. The Dendera Necropolis dates back to the Early Dynastic Period and up to the First Intermediate Period, which pre-dates the Middle Kingdom construction of the Temple of Hathor. The necropolis runs across the eastern edge of the western hill and over the northern plain.

== Hathor temple ==
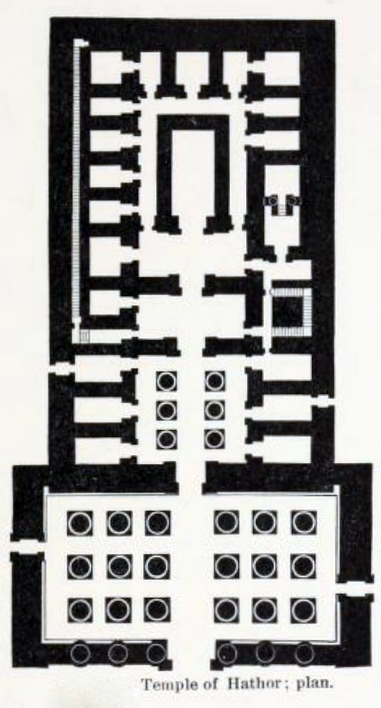
Plan of Hathor Temple

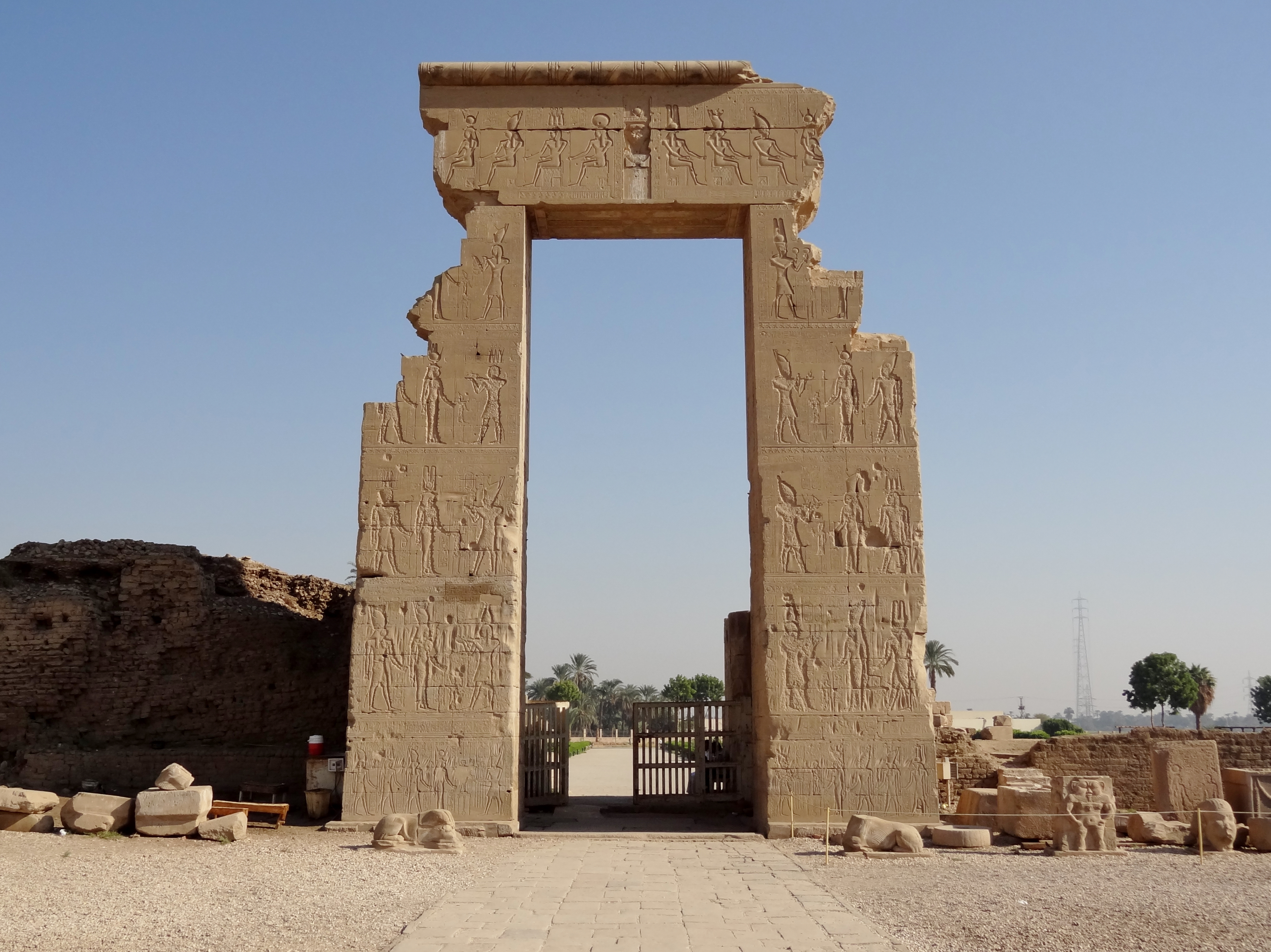
"Gate of Domitian and Trajan" northern entrance of the Temple of Hathor, in Dendera, Egypt.

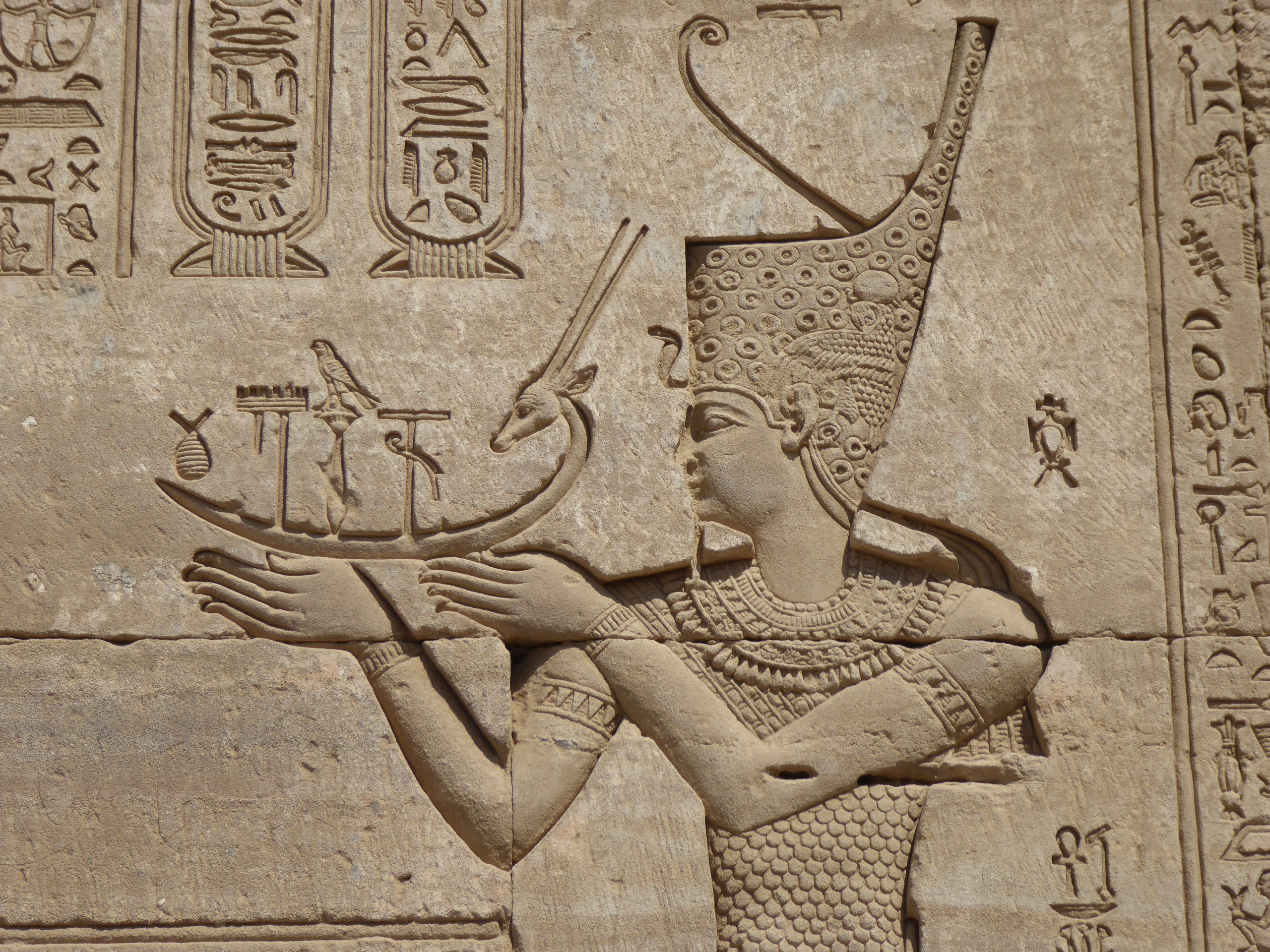
Roman Emperor Trajan as a Pharaoh making an offering to the Gods, in Dendera, Egypt.

The temple that dominates this complex, the structure that commands the attention of those who visit, is the Temple of Hathor. The original temple structure underwent continuous modifications throughout the Middle Kingdom and up until the beginning of the reign of the Roman emperor Trajan. The existing temple's structure began construction in 54 B.C.E, the late Ptolemaic period, under the reign of Ptolemy Auletes. The hypostyle hall was built in the Roman period under Tiberius.

In Egypt, Trajan was quite active in constructing buildings and decorating them. He appears, together with Domitian, in offering scenes on the propylaeum of the Temple of Hathor. His cartouche also appears in the column shafts of the Temple of Khnum at Esna.

Layout elements of the temple are:

- Large Hypostyle Hall
- Small Hypostyle Hall
- Laboratory
- Storage magazine
- Offering entry
- Treasury
- Exit to well
- Access to stairwell
- Offering hall
- Hall of the Ennead
- Great Seat and main sanctuary
- Shrine of the Nome of Dendera
- Shrine of Isis
- Shrine of Sokar
- Shrine of Harsomtus
- Shrine of Hathor's Sistrum
- Shrine of gods of Lower Egypt
- Shrine of Hathor
- Shrine of the throne of Rê
- Shrine of Rê
- Shrine of Menat collar
- Shrine of Ihy
- The Pure Place
- Court of the First Feast
- Passage
- Staircase to roof

Depictions of Cleopatra VI, which appear on temple walls, are good examples of Ptolemaic Egyptian art. On the rear of the temple exterior is a carving of Cleopatra VII Philopator (the popular, well-known Cleopatra) and her son, Ptolemy XV Philopator Philometor Caesar (Caesarion), who was fathered by Julius Caesar.

There are ten dead deities represented at Dendera, specifically on/in Hathor's temple, that can be connected to the nine dead deities at Horus's temple in Edfu. This would be due to the either parental or marital relationship between Hathor and Horus.

=== Dendera zodiac ===
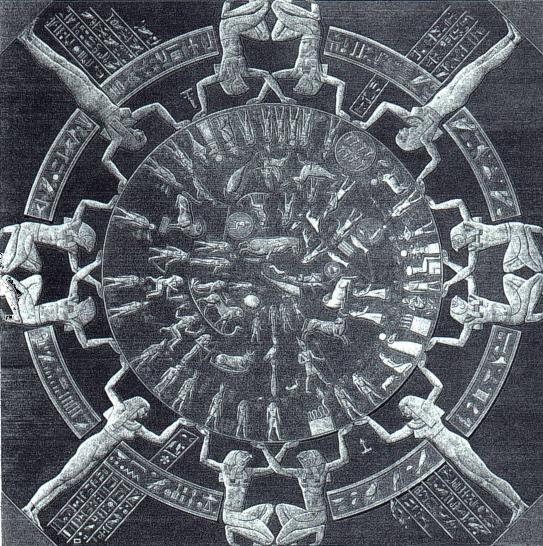
The Denderah zodiac

The sculptured Dendera zodiac (or Denderah zodiac) is a widely known relief found in a late Greco-Roman temple, containing images of the zodiac system still recognized today (i.e. Taurus [bull] and Libra [scales]). A sketch was made during the Napoleonic campaign in Egypt. In 1820 it was removed from the temple ceiling by Frenchmen and later replaced with a copy. There is controversy as to whether they were granted permission by Egypt's ruler, Muhammad Ali Pasha, to do so, or whether they stole it. (It is also said that in 1822, an antiquities thief using the name "Claude Le Lorraine,” who should not to be confused with the French Baroque painter, removed the zodiac from Dendera, brought it back to France, and sold it to the King.) The real bas relief is now in the Louvre. Jean-François Champollion, the man who deciphered the Rosetta Stone, dated it back to the Ptolemaic period, and it has been proved that he was correct, as Egyptologists now date it back to the first century BC.

=== Crypts ===
The Hathor temple's subterranean tombs contain twelve chambers. Some reliefs seen in the tombs are dated to as late as the reign of Ptolemy XII Auletes. The crypts reportedly were used for storing vessels and divine iconography. An opening in the Flame Room floor leads to a narrow chamber with representations on the walls of the objects which were kept in them. In the second chamber, a relief depicts Pepi I offering a statuette of the God Ihy to four images of Hathor. (Hathor is understood to be Ihy's mother.) In the crypt accessible from the Throne Room, Ptolemy XII has jewelry and offerings for the gods.

=== "Dendera light" reliefs ===
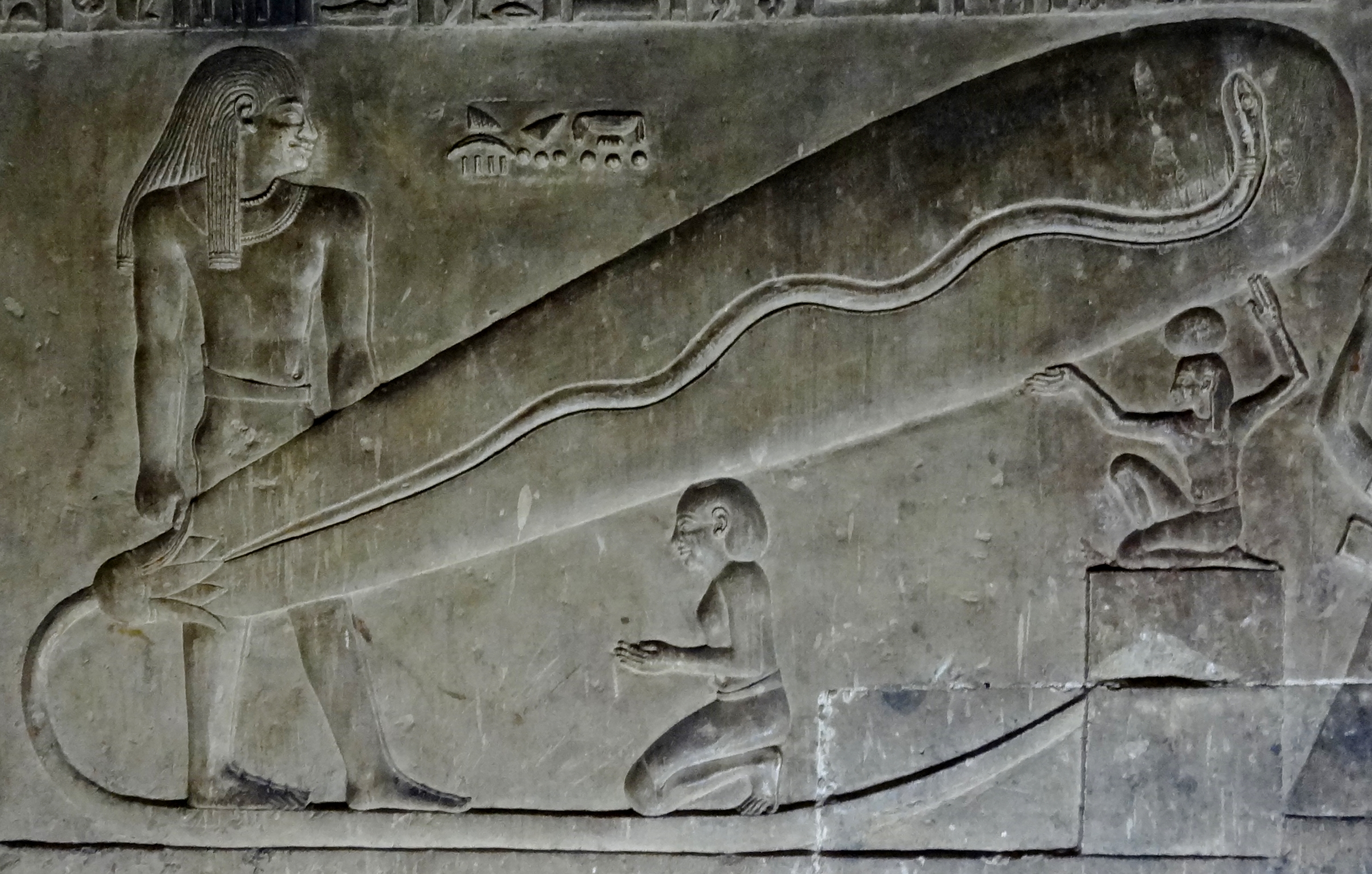
"Dendera light"

The Hathor Temple has stone reliefs that depict Harsomtus, in the form of a snake, emerging from a lotus flower. Harsomtus was equated with the god Ra. Harsomtus, also known as Horus, is depicted as one of the ancient gods, a "primeval creator." Harsomtus is likely depicted at the Dendera temple complex due to the main temple being dedicated to Hathor. In Egyptian mythology, Harsomtus is referenced as either Hathor's son or lover. In six reliefs he is positioned within an oval container called a hn, which might represent the womb of Nut. The oval container was sometimes interpreted by 20th-century pseudoarchaeologists as a modern incandescent light bulb with a power cord (lotus stem) and filament (snake). (See Dendera light.)

=== Processional staircase ===
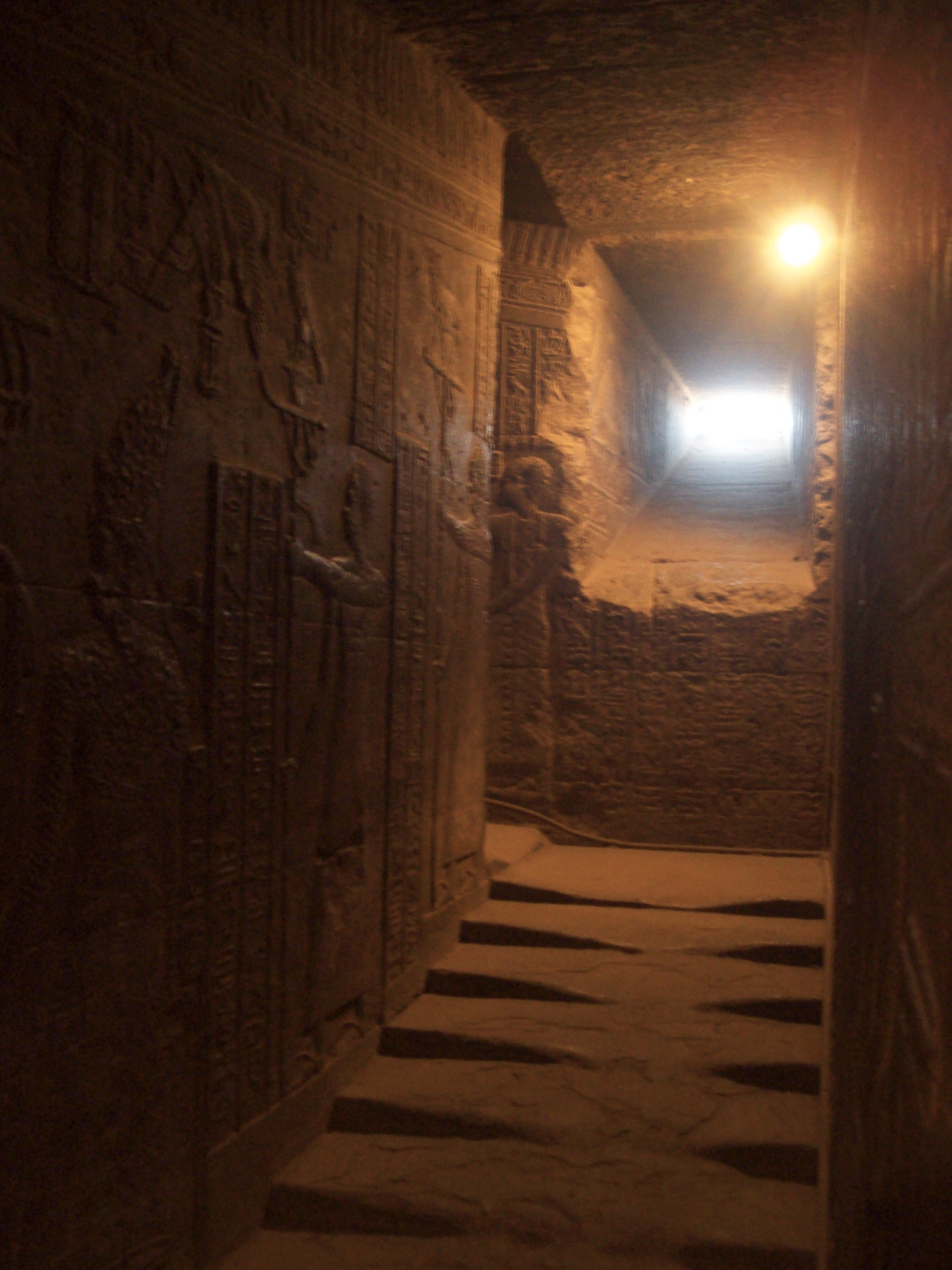
Processional staircase

There is a processional stairway leading to the roof of the temple. Reliefs decorating the walls depict scenes from rituals that would have been performed at the temple. The staircase shows wear from millennia of use, but it also shows an apparent accretion of material, which has lent the staircase the informal name of "the melted stairs."

=== Restoration work ===
The Supreme Council of Antiquities began the project of restoration and maintenance of the temple in 2005. Efforts stopped in 2011 and then resumed in 2017, after the completion of necessary scientific and archaeological studies, along with careful experimental studies using modern techniques. As of March 2021, the second phase of the restoration has been completed, which includes cleaning the Great Pillars Hall and restoring the original colors and clarity of painted scenes on walls and ceilings. More activity continues at the temple, including a cooperative effort started in 2019 with the French Archaeological delegation to turn the temple courtyard into an open museum.

== Roman mammisi ==
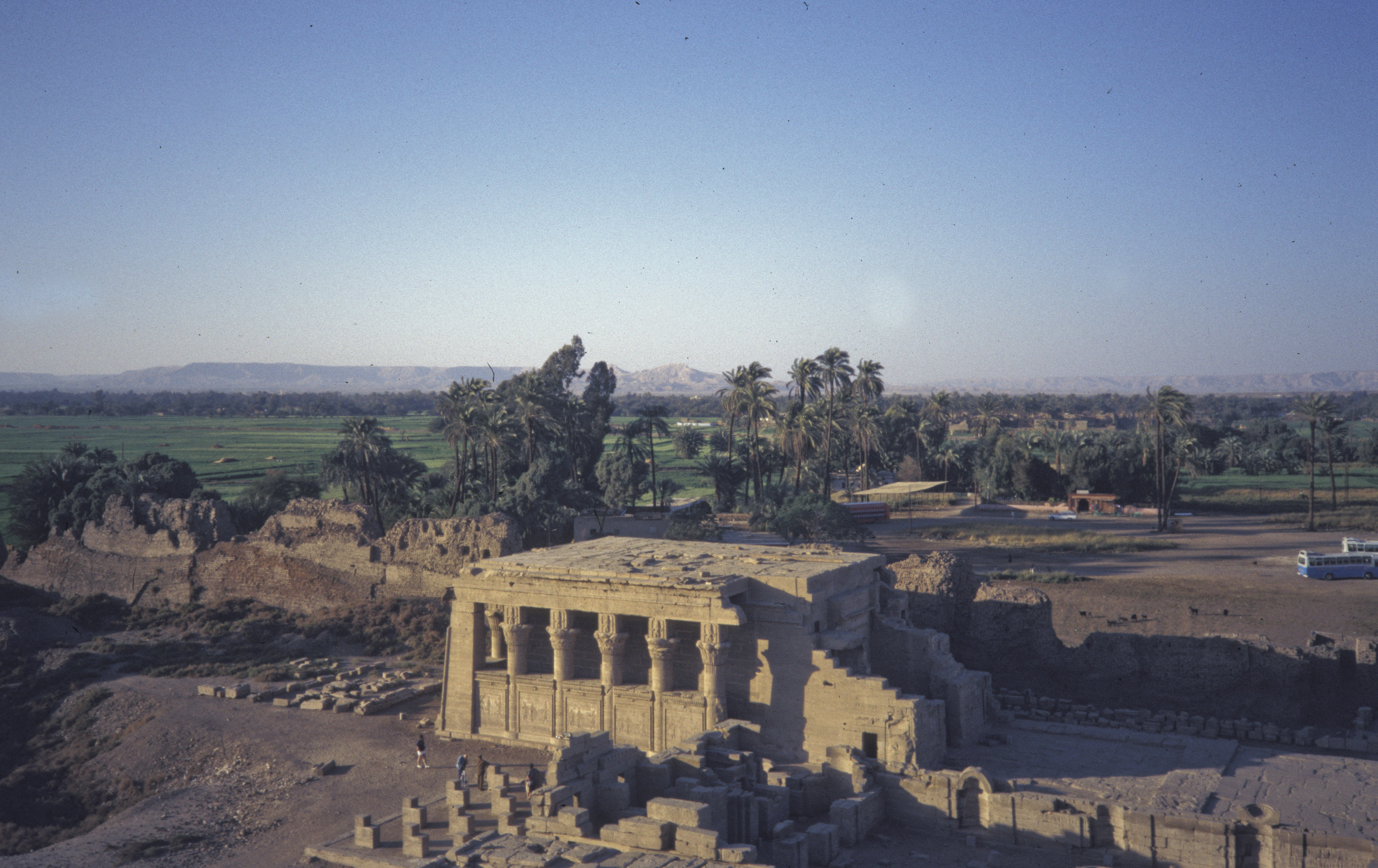
The Roman mammisi

The Roman mammisi is a subsidiary building dating to the reigns of Trajan and Marcus Aurelius. Numerous reliefs of Trajan making offerings to Egyptian deities can be seen. The presence of the Roman mammisi at the Dendera temple complex is indicative of the long and complicated history of the Romans in Egypt. As seen in the images below, Roman Emperor Trajan is depicted in the reliefs as an Egyptian pharaoh making offerings to Egyptian gods.

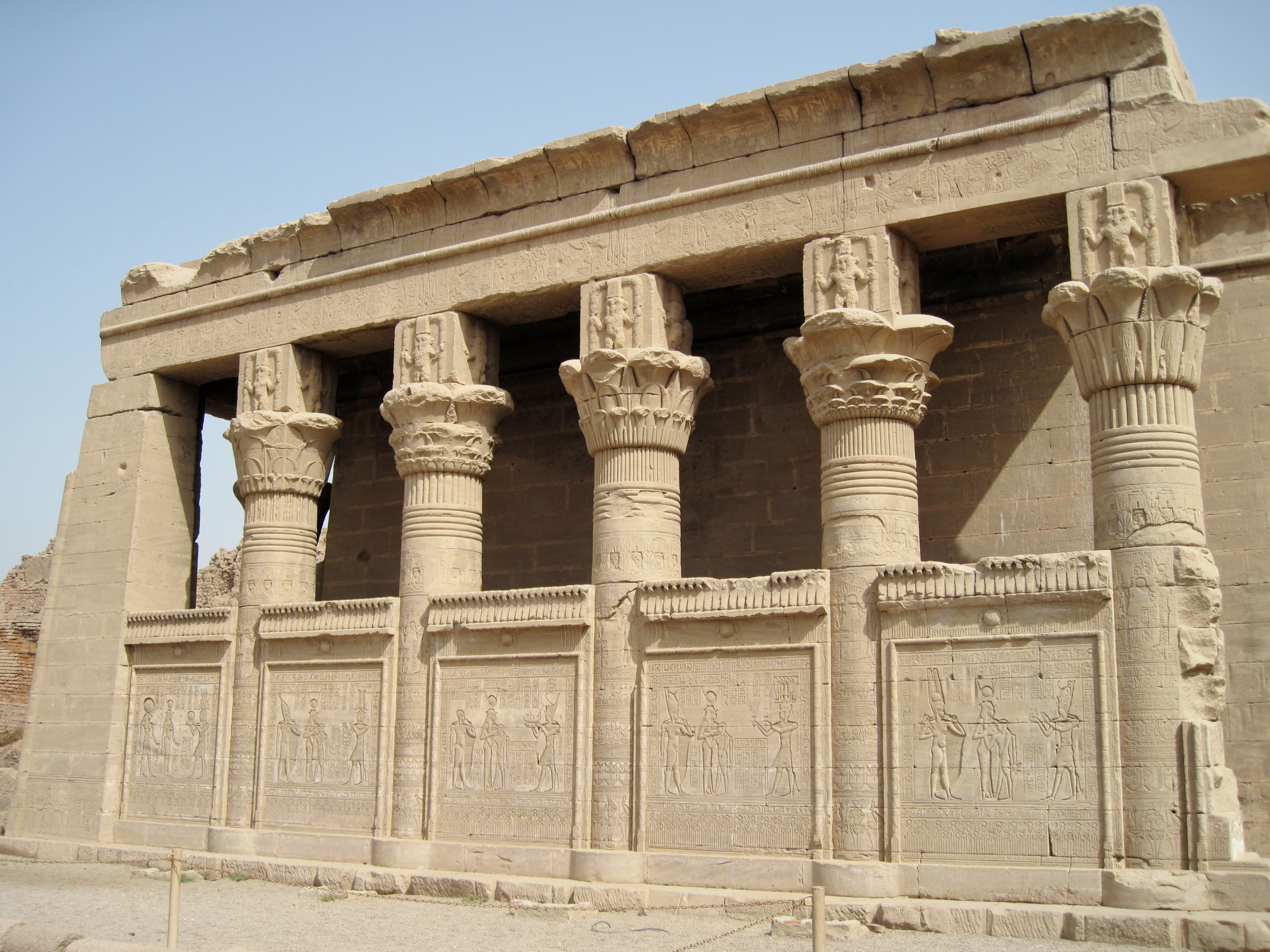
Side with reliefs

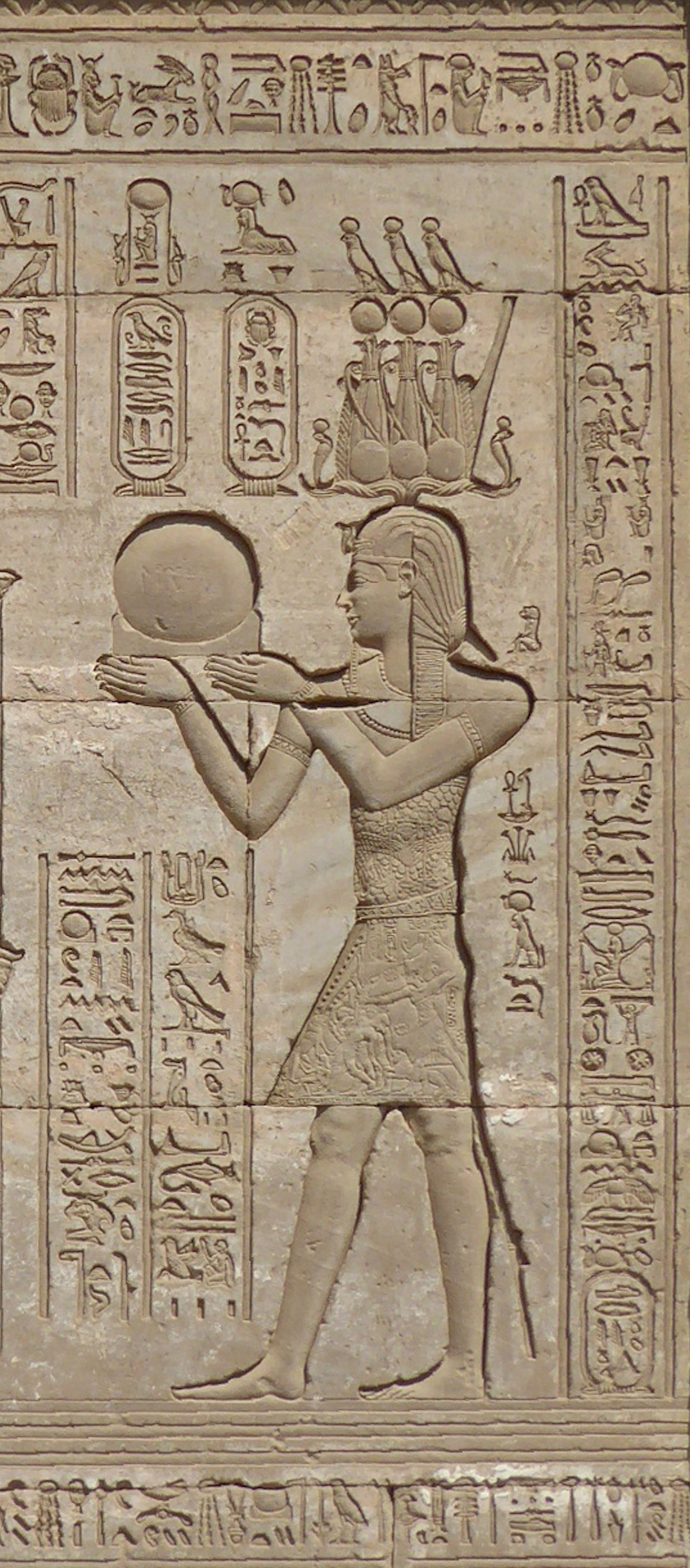
Roman Emperor Trajan at Dendera, Egypt

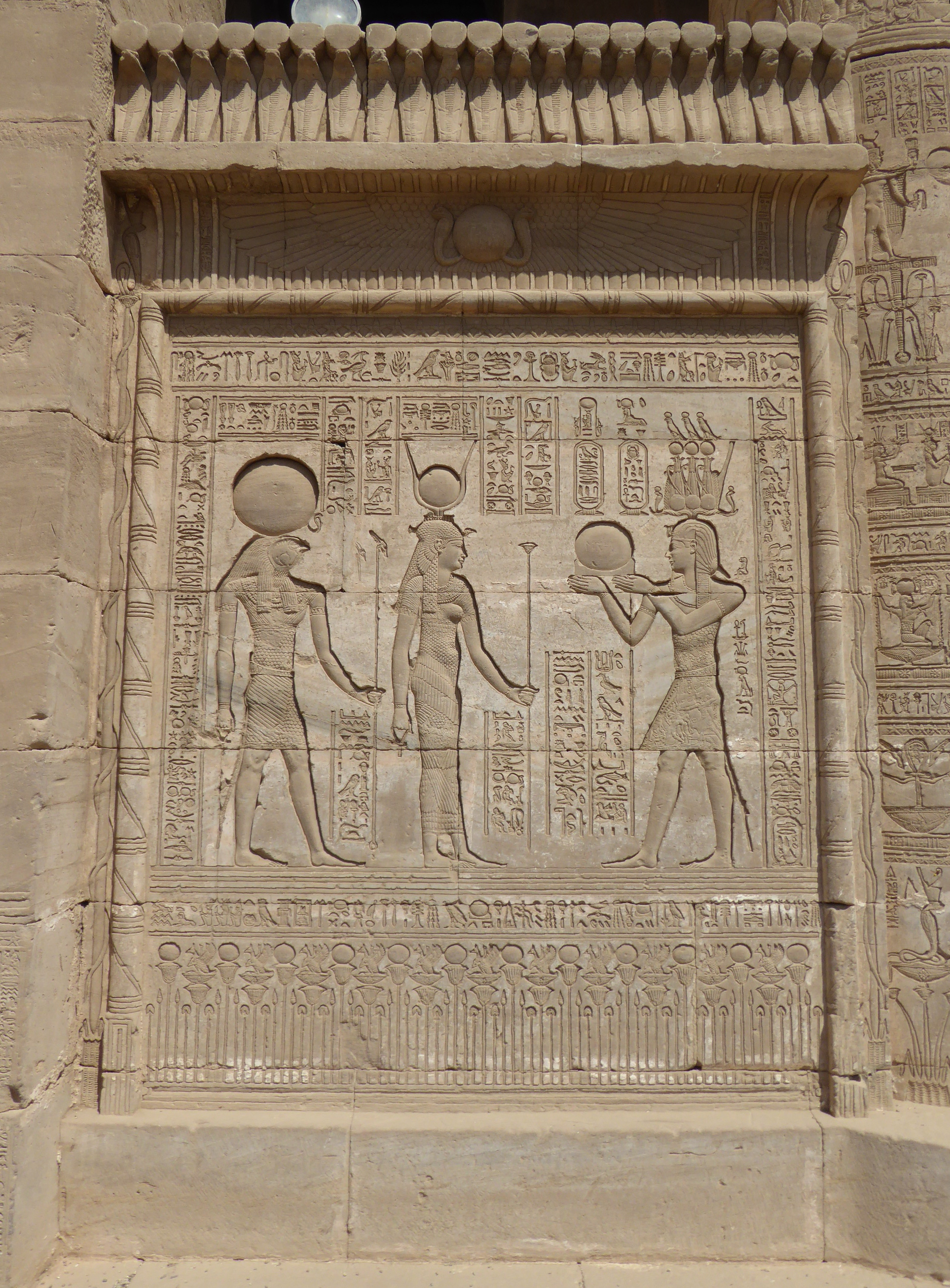
Roman Emperor Trajan brings offerings to Hathor and Ra-Harakhte, Dendera.

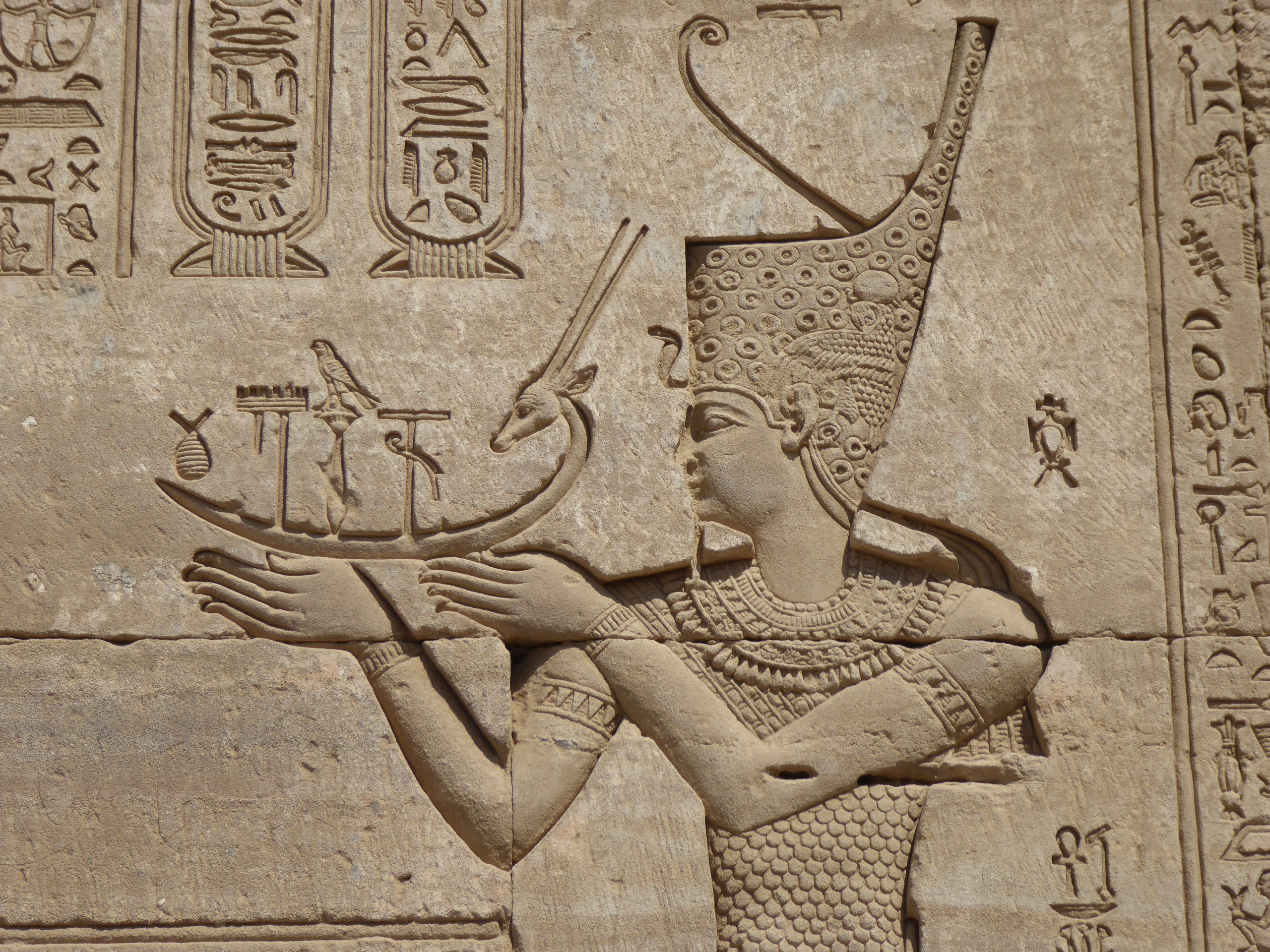
Emperor Trajan as a Pharaoh making an offering to the gods, in Dendera.

== Recent discoveries ==
In March 2023, during the recent excavations at the site archaeologists uncovered a limestone sphinx. This sphinx is depicted with a slight grin and dimples and is thought to have been created in the image of the Roman emperor Claudius. On the sphinx's head sits a nemes that has a cobra-shaped tip called a uraeus.

== Tourism ==
The Dendera complex has long been one of the most tourist-accessible ancient Egyptian places of worship. It is possible to visit virtually every part of the complex, from the crypts to the roof (at least until November 2025)

== Gallery ==
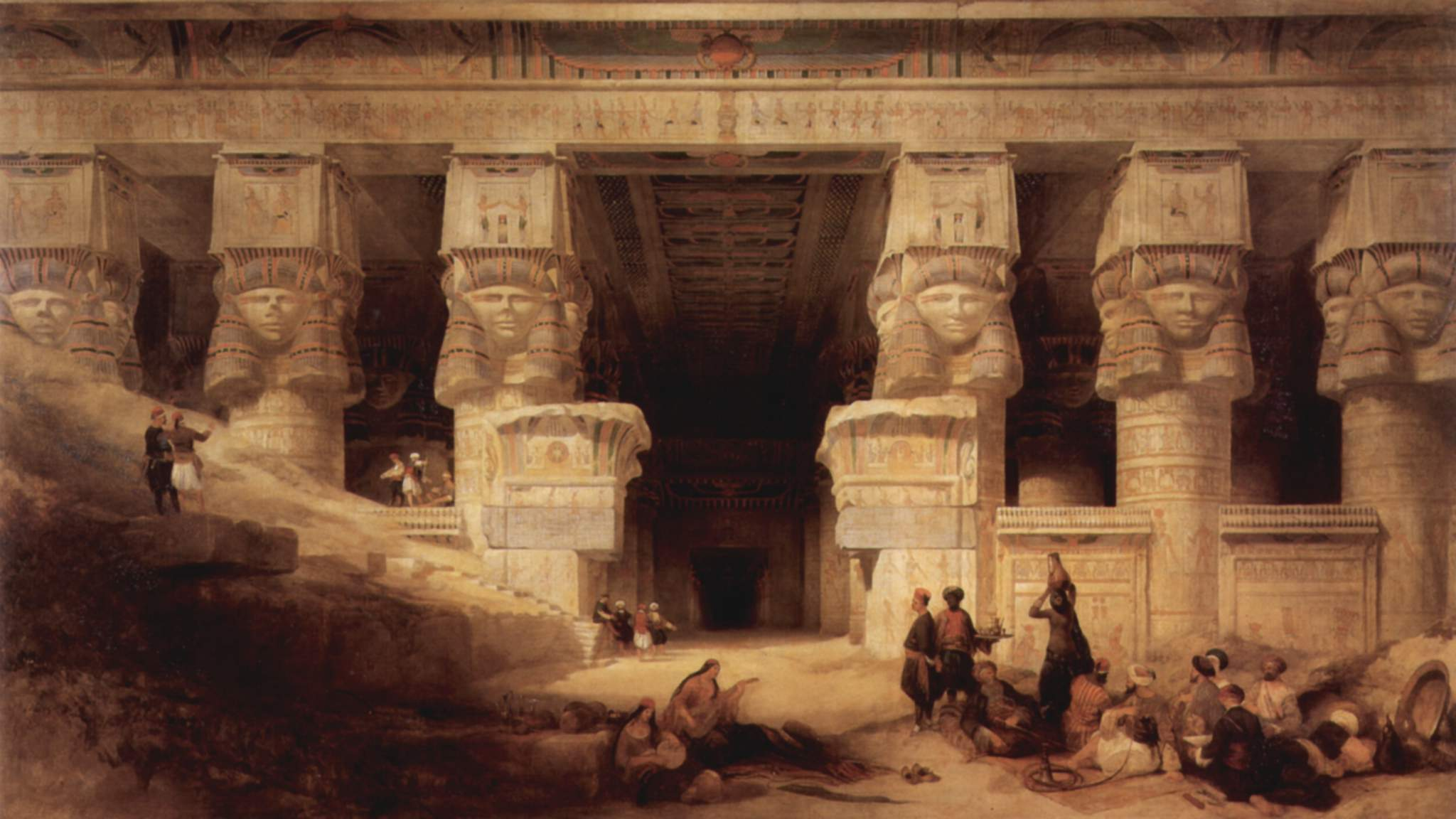
The Temple of Dendera by David Roberts

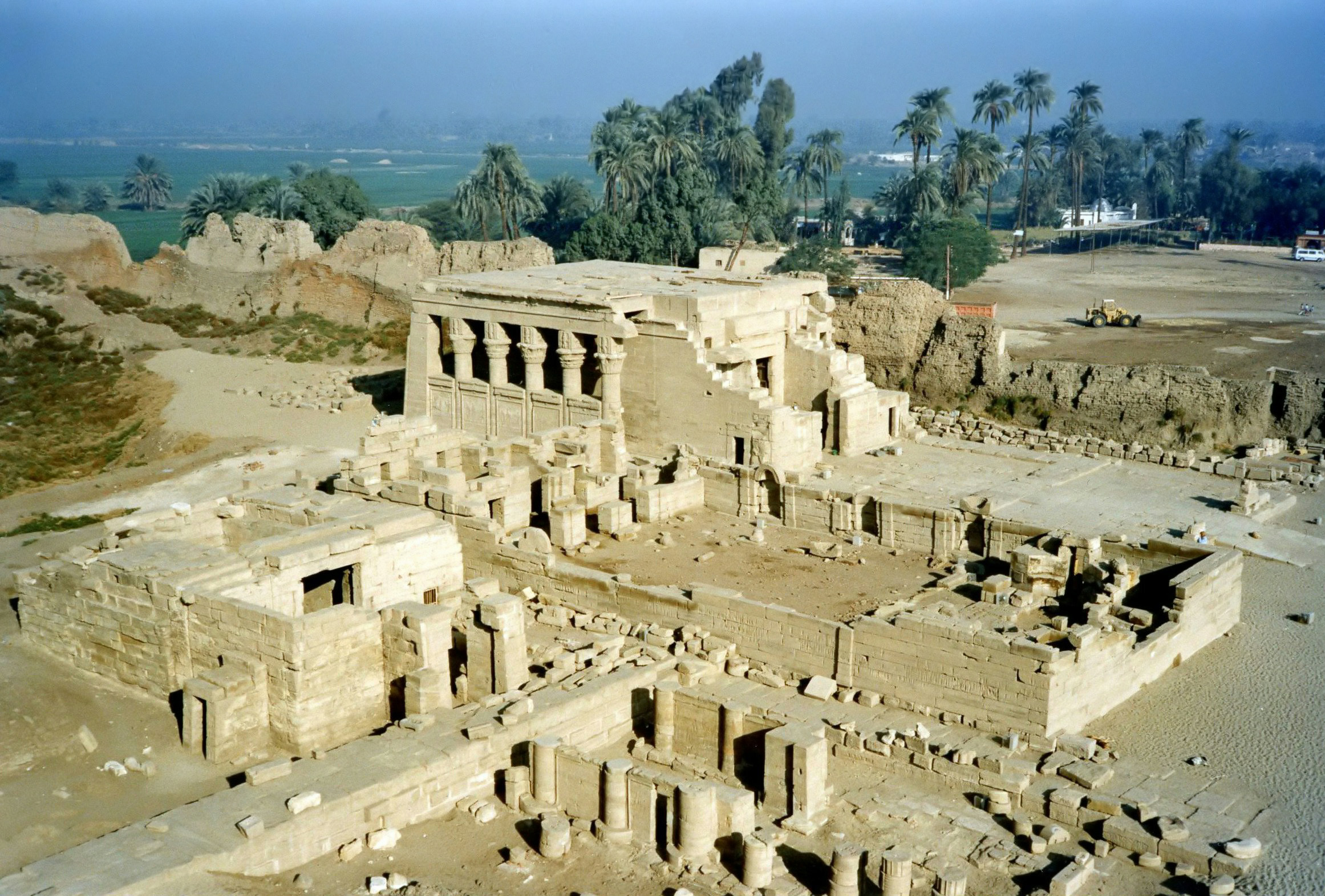
Satellite buildings of the Dendera temple complex

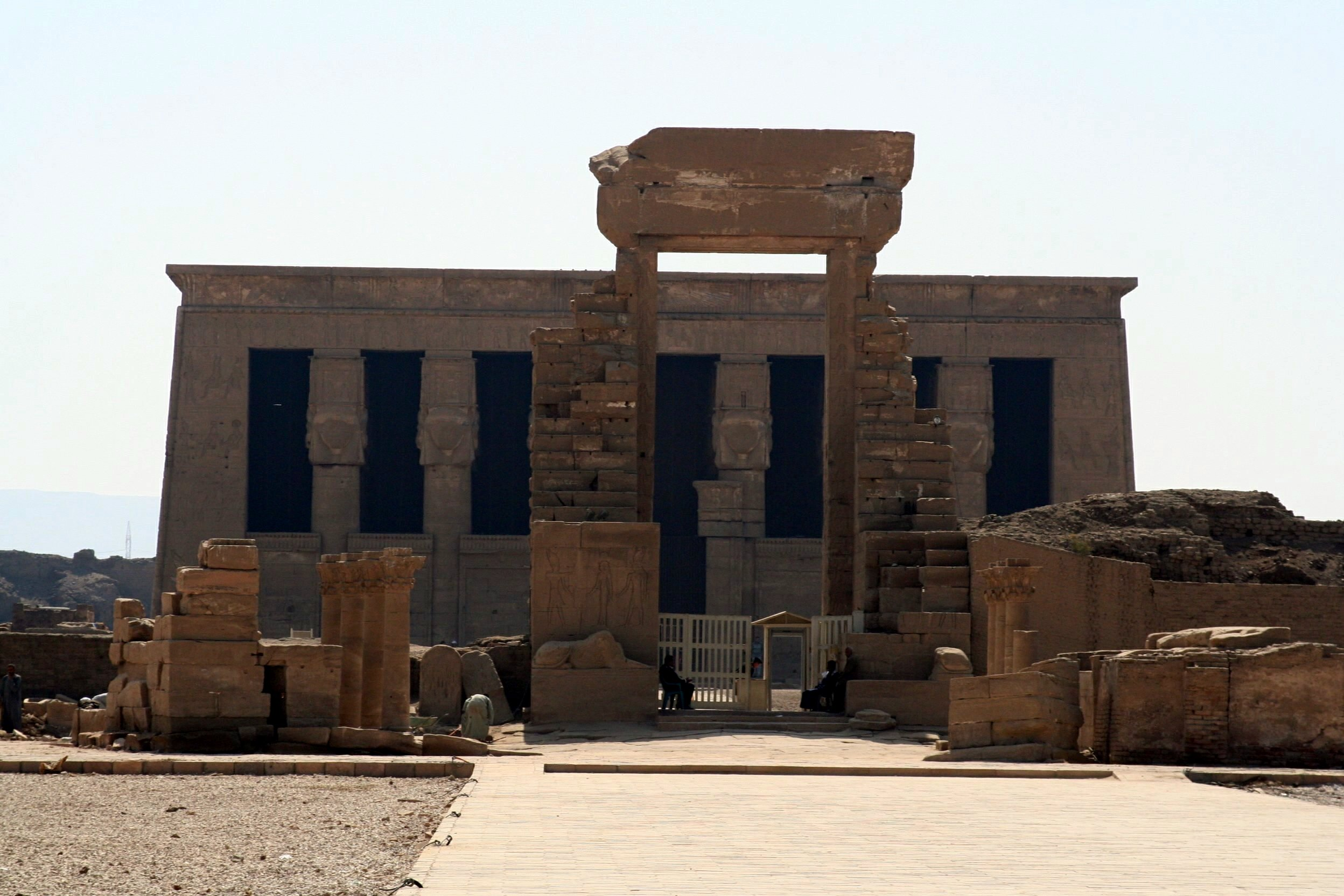
Entrance to the Dendera temple complex

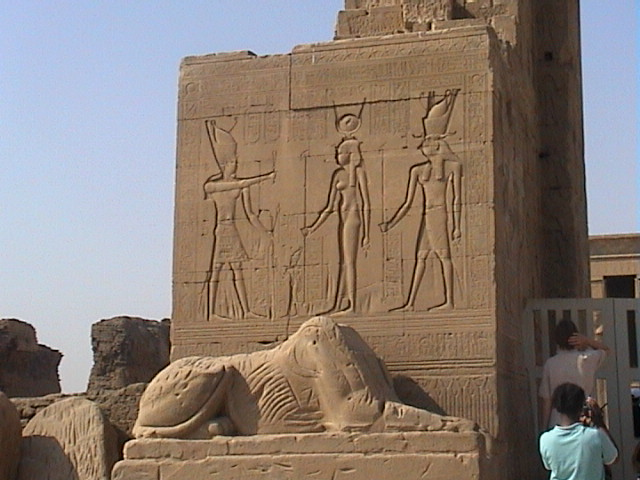
Entrance gate to the temple, with bas-relief and sphinx

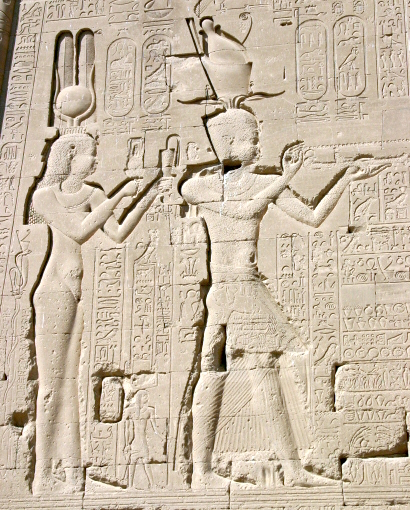
Reliefs of Cleopatra VII and Caesarion, her son by Julius Caesar, at the Dendera Temple

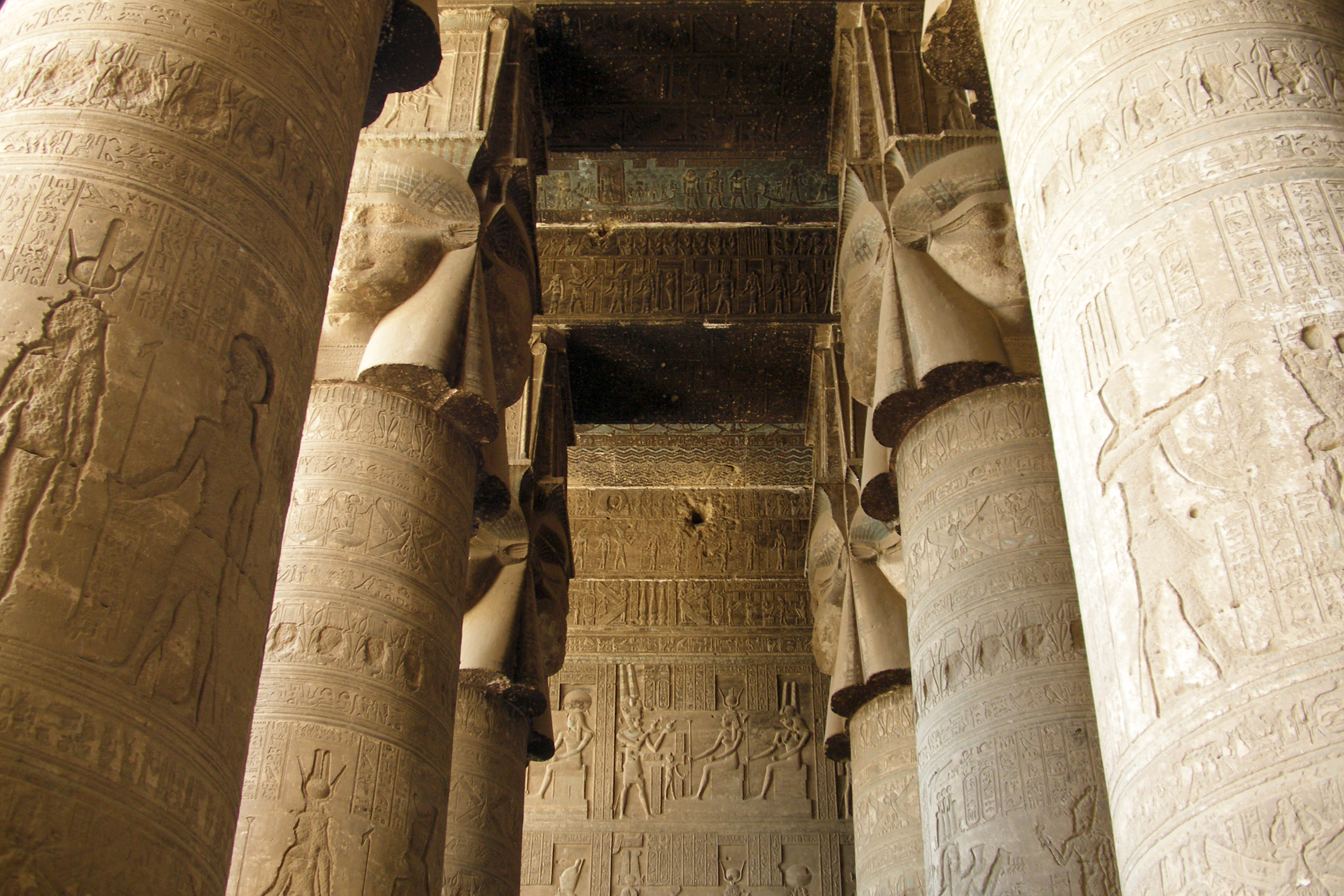
Columns of the Hypostyle Hall

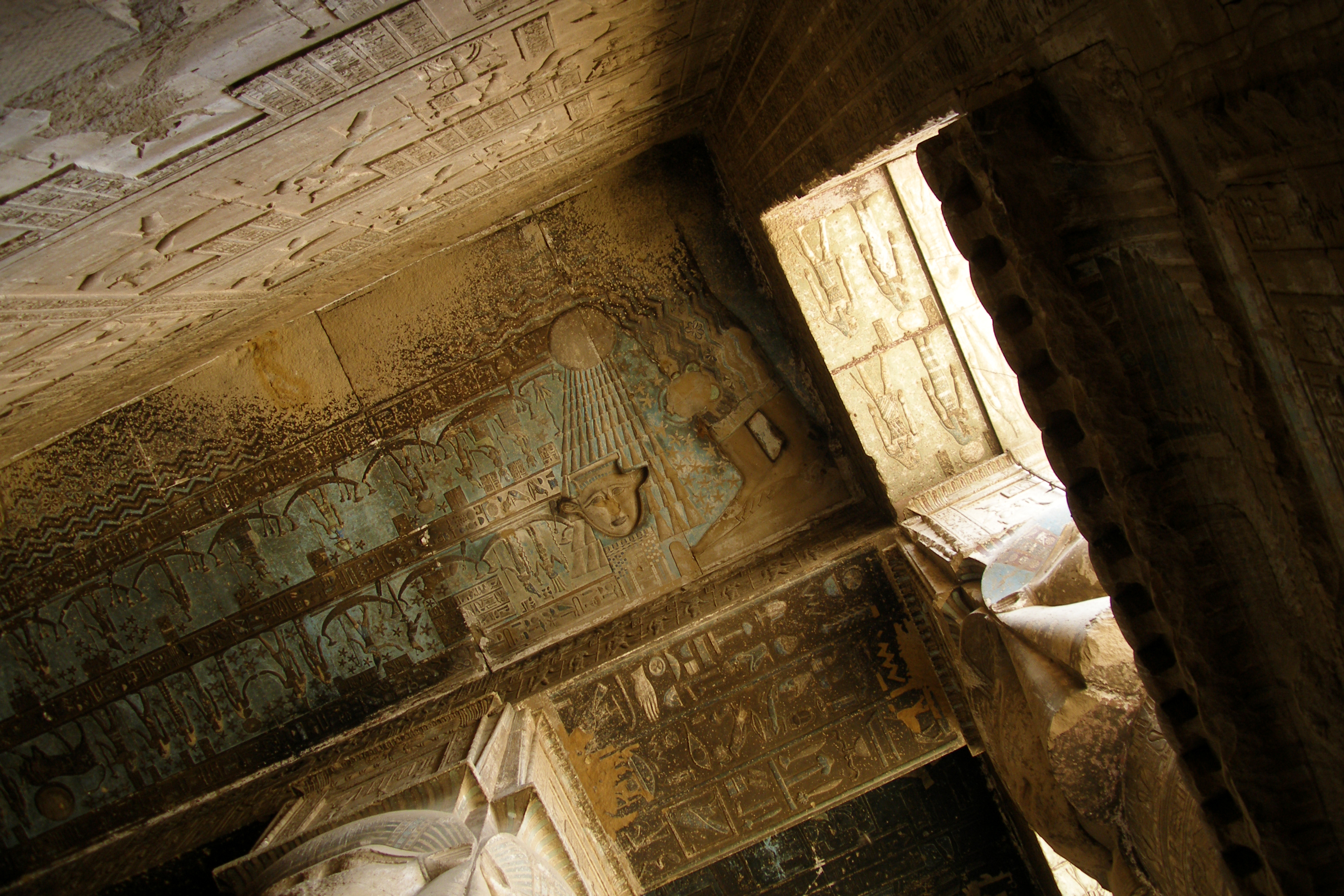
Ceiling of the temple before restoration (photographed 2007)

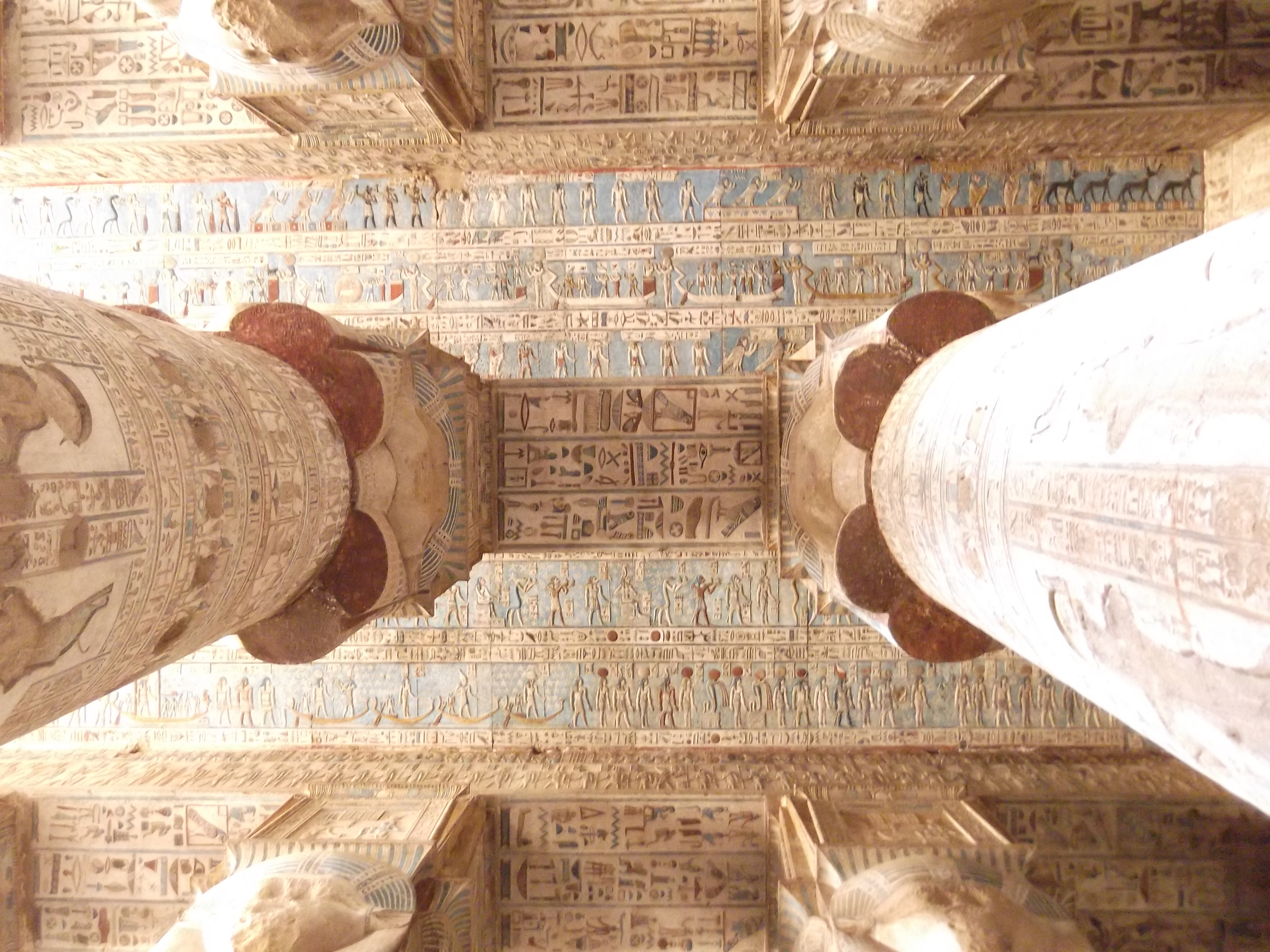
Restored ceiling of the Temple of Hathor (photographed 2011)

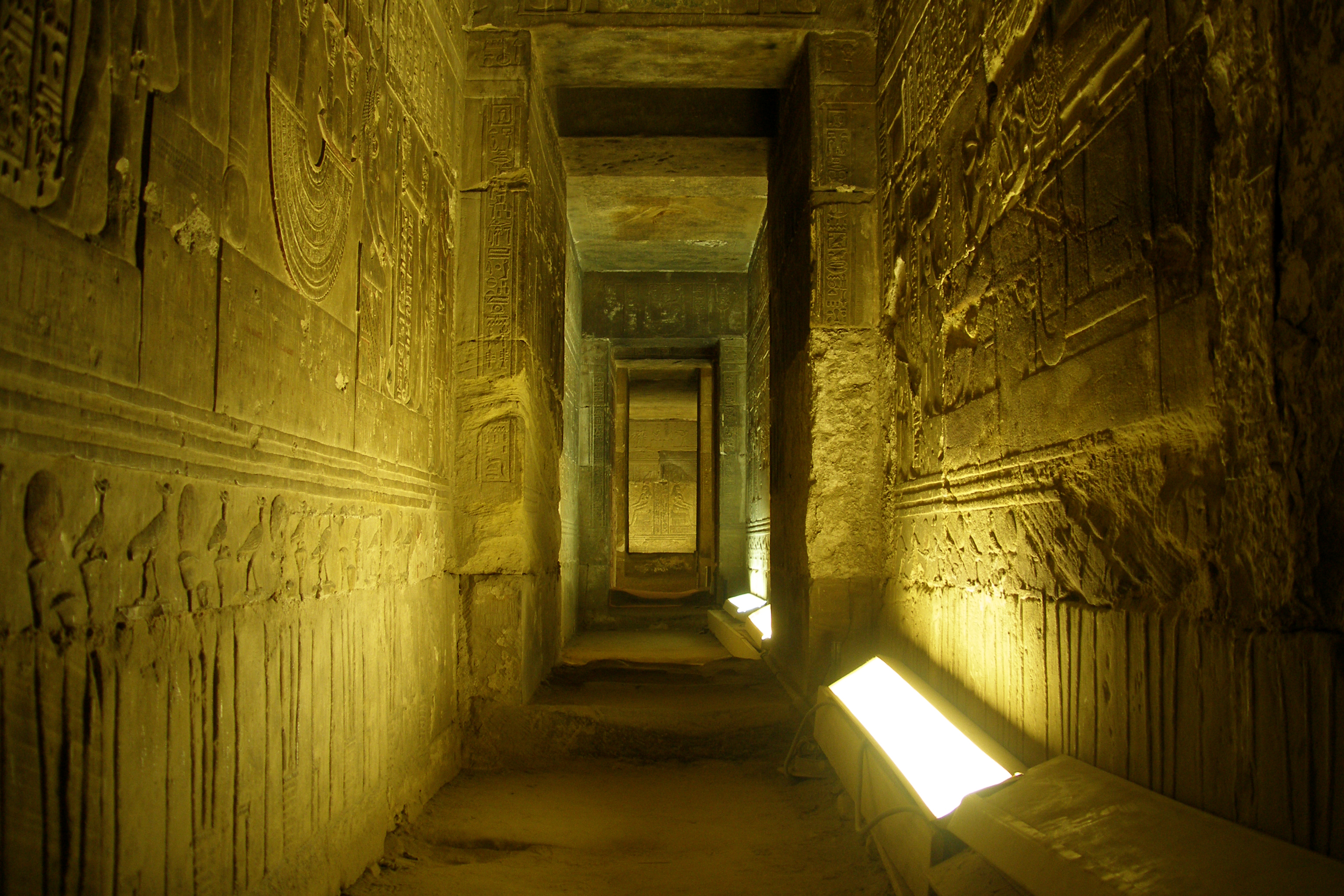
Crypt

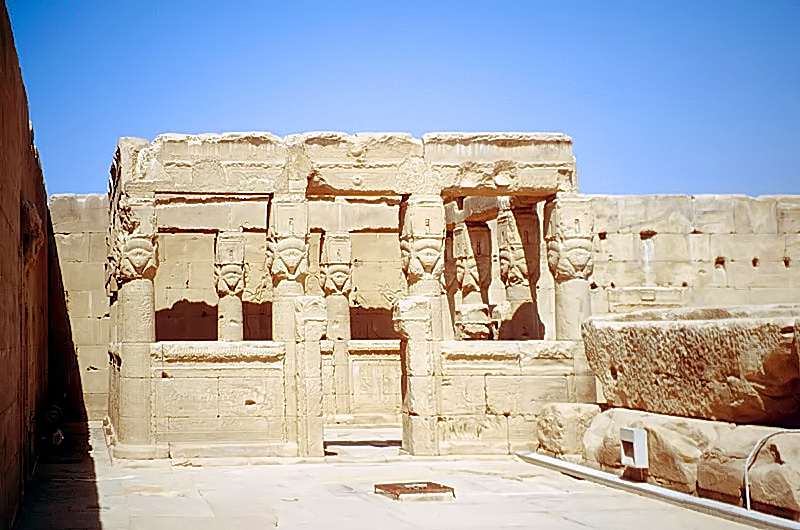
Kiosk of Hathor on the temple roof

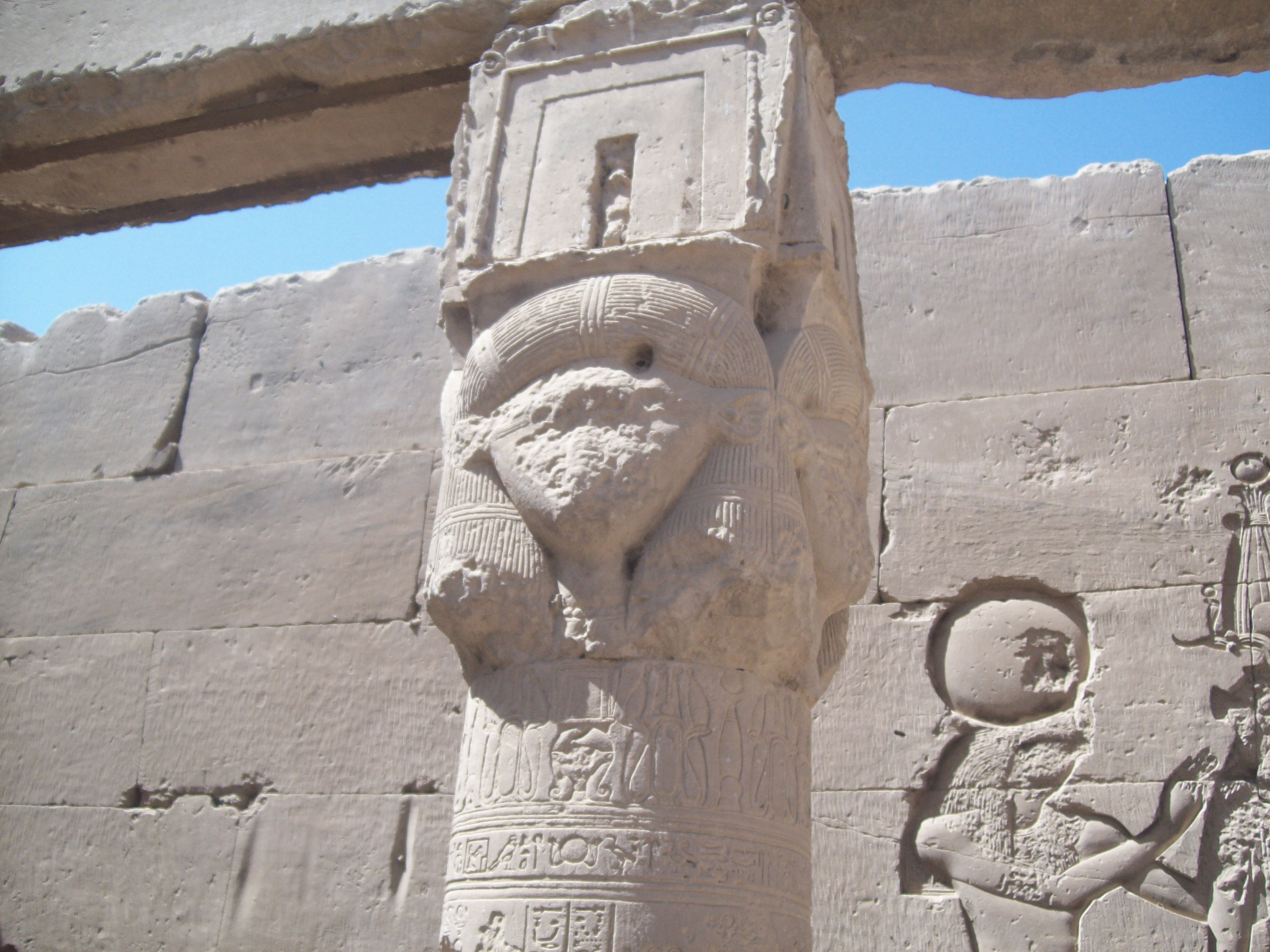
Close-up of a column on the Kiosk

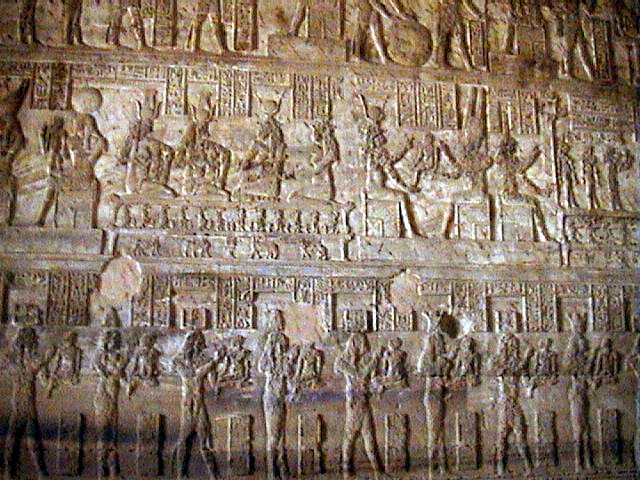
Digitally manipulated photograph of an interior wall in the Mammisi, highlighting the bas-relief

== See also ==
- Esna temple (in Esna)
- List of Ancient Egyptian sites
- Tomb of Meni
- Tomb of Nyibunesu

== Bibliography ==
- Arnold, Dieter; Heywood, Ann; Chen, Sara (August 12, 2018). "Petrified Sound and Digital Color: A Hathor Colum in the New Ptolemaic Galleries." The Metropolitan Museum of Art. Retrieved February 12, 2023.
- Bard, Kathryn A. (2005). Encyclopedia of the Archaeology of Ancient Egypt. Routledge. p. 252. ISBN 978-1-134-66525-9
- Brodie, Neil, and Colin Renfrew. "Looting and the World's Archaeological Heritage: The Inadequate Response." Annual Review of Anthropology, 2005: 343-361. doi:10.1146/annurev.anthro.34.081804.120551
- GABER, AMR (2015). "THE TEN DEAD DEITIES OF THE TEMPLE OF DENDERA". The Journal of Egyptian Archaeology. 101: 239–262. ISSN 0307-5133 JSTOR 26379046
- Hammerton, J. A. Wonders of the Past: a World-Wide Survey of the Marvellous Works of Man in Ancient Times. Edited by J. A. (John Alexander) Hammerton. New ed. ... New York: Wise & Co., 1937.
  - Seen in book format here: https://archive.org/details/wondersofpastwor00hamm/page/n11/mode/2up
- Kaper, O.E. “A Fragment from the Osiris Chapels at Dendera in Bristol.” Jaarbericht Van Het Vooraziatisch Egyptisch Genootschap Ex Oriente Lux 41 (December 31, 2008): 31–45. Retrieved from https://hdl.handle.net/1887/14086
- Kipfer, Barbara Ann (2000). Encyclopedic Dictionary of Archaeology. New York: Kluwer Academic/Plenum Publishers. p. 153. ISBN 0-306-46158-7
- Kuta, Sarah. "Smiling Sphinx Statue Unearthed in Egypt." Smithsonian Magazine. March 8, 2023. https://www.smithsonianmag.com/smart-news/archaeologists-egypt-unearth-small-sphinx-statue-180981770/.
- "Pharaonic temples in Upper Egypt from the Ptolemaic and Roman periods". UNESCO: World Heritage Center. 28 July 2003. Retrieved 16 March 2023. https://whc.unesco.org/en/tentativelists/1824/ [Website]
- Richter, Barbara A. 2016. The Theology of Hathor of Dendera. Edited by Jacco Dieleman and Carol Redmount. PDF. Lockwood Press. https://escholarship.org/uc/item/8np4d4hf.
- Rosicrucian Egyptian Museum (2023). "Middle Kingdom Monuments: Dendera Temple Complex". Roscicrucian Egyptian Museum. Retrieved 16 March 2023. https://egyptianmuseum.org/explore/middle-kingdom-monuments-dendera-temple-complex [Museum Website]
- Salem, Aisha. “Finders Keepers? The Repatriation of Egyptian Art.” Journal of Technology Law & Policy 10, no. 1 (June 2005). https://scholarship.law.ufl.ed/jtlp/vol10/iss1/6.
- United Nations Educational, Scientific and Cultural Organization. “Convention for the Protection of Cultural Property in the Event of Armed Conflict with Regulations for the Execution of the Convention.” 1954. [Hague Convention Paperwork] https://en.unesco.org/sites/default/files/1954_Convention_EN_2020.pdf
- Verner, Miroslav; Bryson-Gustova, Anna (2013). "Dendera: The Heliopolis of Hathor". Temple of the World: Sanctuaries, Cults, and Mysteries of Ancient Egypt. Translated by Bryson-Gustova, Anna. Cairo: The American University in Cairo Press. pp. 442–481. ISBN 977-416-563-2
