= Nyibunesu =

Ancient Egyptian priest

sw t n F34 F34 F34 b
Ny-ibu-nesu
in hieroglyphs
Era: Old Kingdom
(2686–2181 BC)

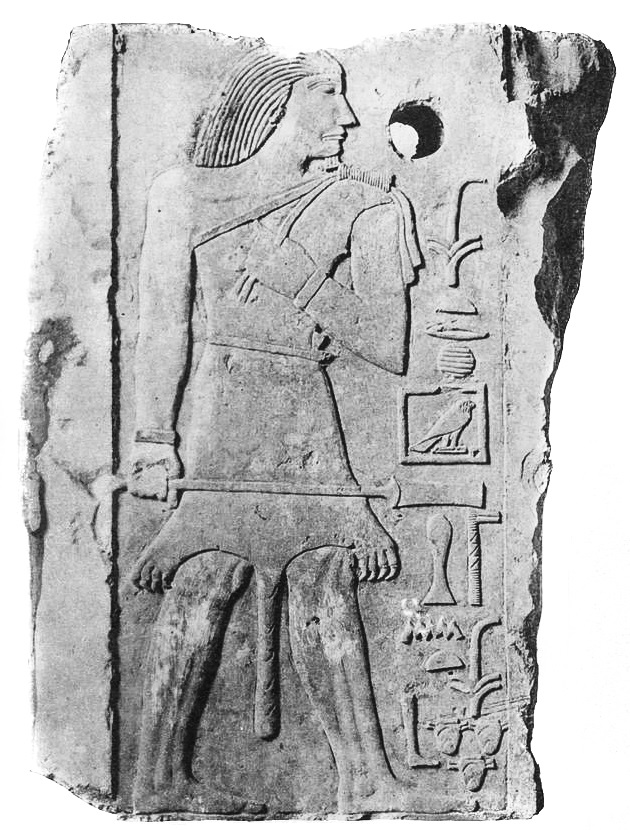
Photograph (Petrie, 1898).

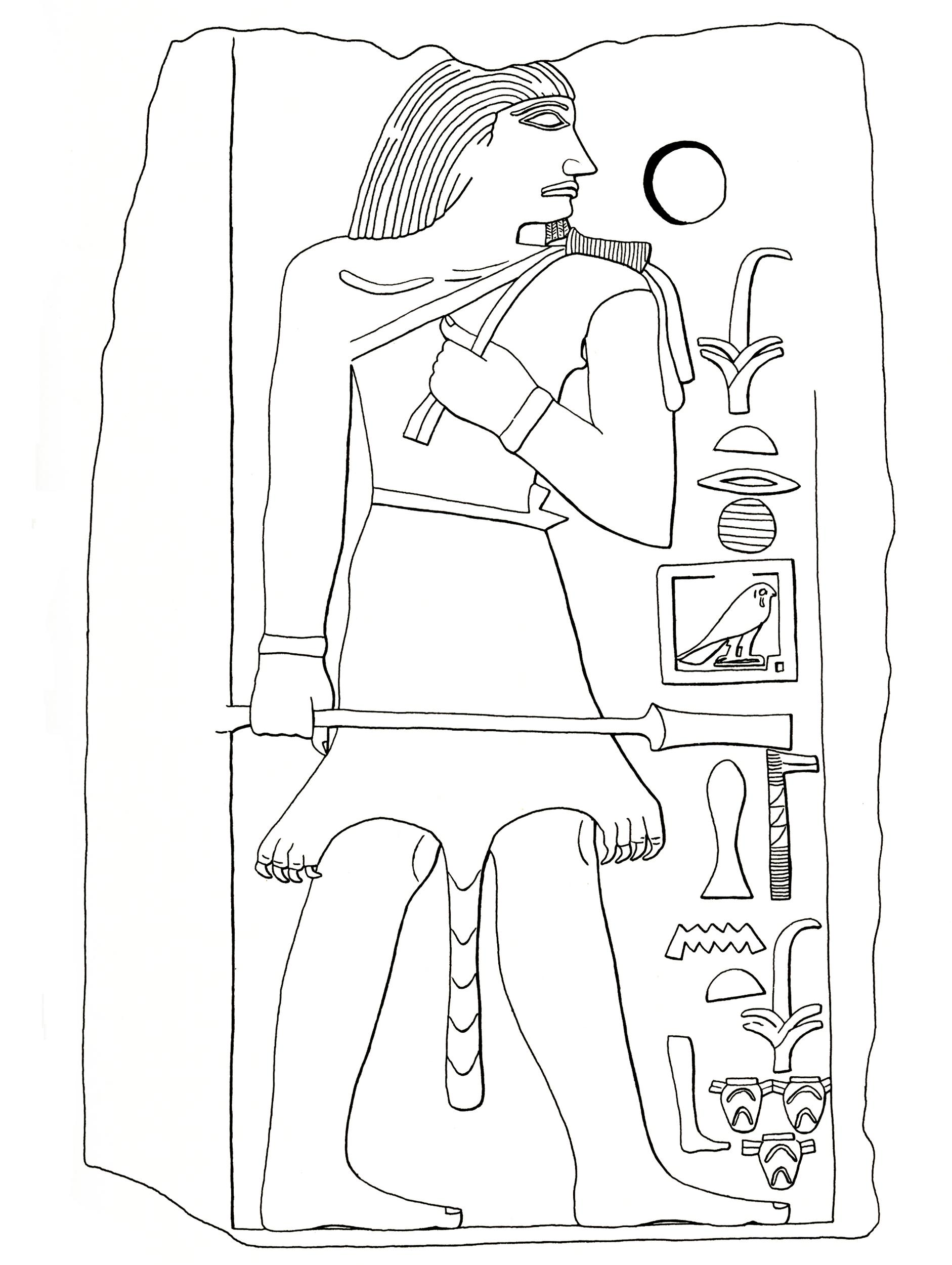
Line drawing (James, 1911).

Low relief of Nyibunesu, with his titles and name written in hieroglyphs.

Nyibunesu, Ni-Ibunesut or Ne-Ibunesu (also mentioned as Suten-en-Abu or Abu-Suten in older sources) was an ancient Egyptian priest of Hathor and local chief who lived during the Third or Fourth Dynasty in the region of Dendera. What is known from his life comes from his mastaba burial tomb in the Dendera Necropolis, a few hundred metres south of the Temple to Hathor. This tomb was explored during 1897 and 1898 by a team led by the British archaeologist Flinders Petrie.

== Life ==
Nyibunesu was doubtless a high-ranking local personage, most likely the chief man at Dendera at the end of the Third or beginning of the Fourth Dynasty. During his lifetime, Nyibunesu must have held a number of titles, but only two are recorded in his tomb: "king's acquaintance" and ḥem-priest (or prophet) of Hathor. This may be one of the earliest references to the cult of the goddess Hathor. The longest inscription found in Nyibnesu's tomb just includes these two titles and his name:

sw t r x O10 nTr Hm sw t n F34 F34 F34 b

rḫ-nswt ḥm-nṯr ḥwt-ḥr n(y)-jbw-nswt
The acquaintance of the king and priest of Hathor, Nyibunesu.

— Relief from the tomb of Nyibunesu

In the artwork found in his tomb, Nyibunesu appears holding a staff in his right hand and in full official dress, including a leopard-skin kilt, typically worn by high ranking priests. His involvement in the Hathor cult seems to corroborate the existence of a sanctuary to the goddess at that time.

== Tomb of Nyibunesu ==
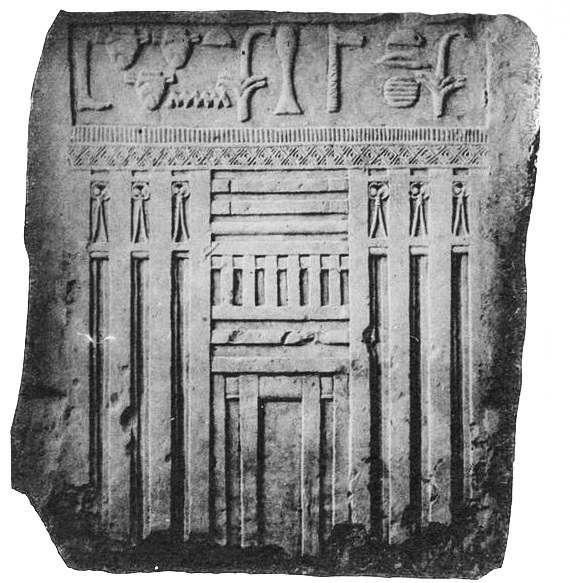
The false door styled as a palace-façade found in the tomb of Nyibunesu.

Nyibunesu's mastaba (M1055) is one of the earliest at the Dendera necropolis. Indeed, the tomb of Nyibunesu is thought to be the oldest in the so-called "Abu Suten Group" (Note: Named after the old name of Nyibunesu in old academic sources.), a small group which includes the earliest burials in this area. It is also the only tomb in the group whose owner is known by name. The mastaba is formed by massive brick walls filled with gravel. When the tomb was explored in 1898, the archaeological team found it mostly empty. It contained two wells, but the chambers below were only filled with cow bones belonging to late burials of the sacred cattle of Hathor.

The east face of the mastaba had a small false door (usually intended for the wife), while the south end featured a large false door (intended for Nyibunesu). Here, at the back, two limestone blocks were found: A false door styled as a palace-façade and, above it, the low relief of Nyibunesu. The Egypt Exploration Fund presented those pieces to the British Museum right after they were found, in 1898. Both are now displayed together in Room 4 (Egyptian Sculpture). (Note: Both blocks are kept in the British Museum EA1266, EA1267.) Apart from these, there were no other texts o representations; indeed, only a piece of pottery was found inside the tomb: a large ring-stand. Later, a third block was found, that most likely was intended for the smaller (eastern) false door: it is a low relief that also displays Nyibunesu, but in this case he looks left and the piece measures less than half the height and width than the other low relief. (Note: This block is kept in the Egyptian Museum J. 89071.) The inscription, however, is exactly the same, although less detailed.

The carvings found inside the tomb were undoubtedly very early: both the sculpture and the false door pattern are consistent with 3rd Dynasty artwork. It may be safer, however, to date them in the Fourth Dynasty since otherwise this would be "an almost isolated example of very early tomb-sculpture from the necropolis of Dendera". Recent comparisons of other pieces of pottery associated with the mastaba confirmed that it was built by the late Third or early Fourth Dynasty.

The figure of Nyibunesu has a stiff and clumsy pose, similar to that of the earliest mastabas. The low relief, however, is strong and well-moulded. The depiction of Nyibunesu shows some remains of black paint on the wig and on the armlet of the pendant arm. Some red paint is visible on the band across the chest. The hieroglyphs on both blocks are elaborately carved, but awkwardly sized and spaced. The false door shows high quality, although heavy, low relief. It represents a palace-façade, and contains Nyibunesu's titles and name on the lintel.

== Bibliography ==
- "EA1266 tomb-relief". British Museum.
- "EA1267 tomb-relief". British Museum.
- Hollis, Susan Tower (2020). Five Egyptian Goddesses: Their Possible Beginnings, Actions, and Relationships in the Third Millennium BCE. Bloomsbury. ISBN 9781474234252.
- Fischer, Henry George (1968). Dendera in the Third Millennium B.C. Down to the Theban Domination of Upper Egypt. New York: J. J. Augustin.
- James, T. G. H. (1961). Hieroglyphic texts from Egyptian Stelae, etc (PDF). London: The Trustees of the British Museum.
- Marouard, Gregory (2017). "Dendara at Its Origins: New Evidence for a Pre- and Early Dynastic Settlement Site in Upper Egypt". Near Eastern Archaeology. 80 (3): 166–75. doi:10.5615/neareastarch.80.3.0166. S2CID 166204105.
- Petrie, William Matthew Flinders (1900). Dendereh 1898. London: The Egypt Exploration Fund.
- Porter, Bertha; Moss, Rosalind (1937). Topographical Bibliography of Ancient Egyptian Hieroglyphic Texts, Reliefs and Paintings. V. Upper Egypt: Sites. Oxford: Griffith Institute. Ashmolean Museum.
- Rapport d'activité 2014-2015 (PDF) (in French). Institut français d’archéologie orientale. 2015.
- Rapport d'activité 2016-2017 (PDF) (in French). Institut français d’archéologie orientale. 2017.

== See also ==
- Dendera Temple complex
- Art of Ancient Egypt
- False door
- Meni (high official)
- British Museum Department of Ancient Egypt and Sudan
