= Menis =

Menis is both a given name and a surname. Notable people with the name include:

- Adán Martín Menis (1943–2010), president of the Canary Islands
- Argentina Menis (1948–2023), Romanian discus thrower
- Fernando Menis (born 1951), Spanish architect
- Menis Ketchum (born 1943), Justice of the Supreme Court of Appeals of West Virginia, U.S.
- Menis Koumandareas (1931–2014), Greek writer
