= Meni (high official) =

Ancient Egyptian high official

- Royal sealer
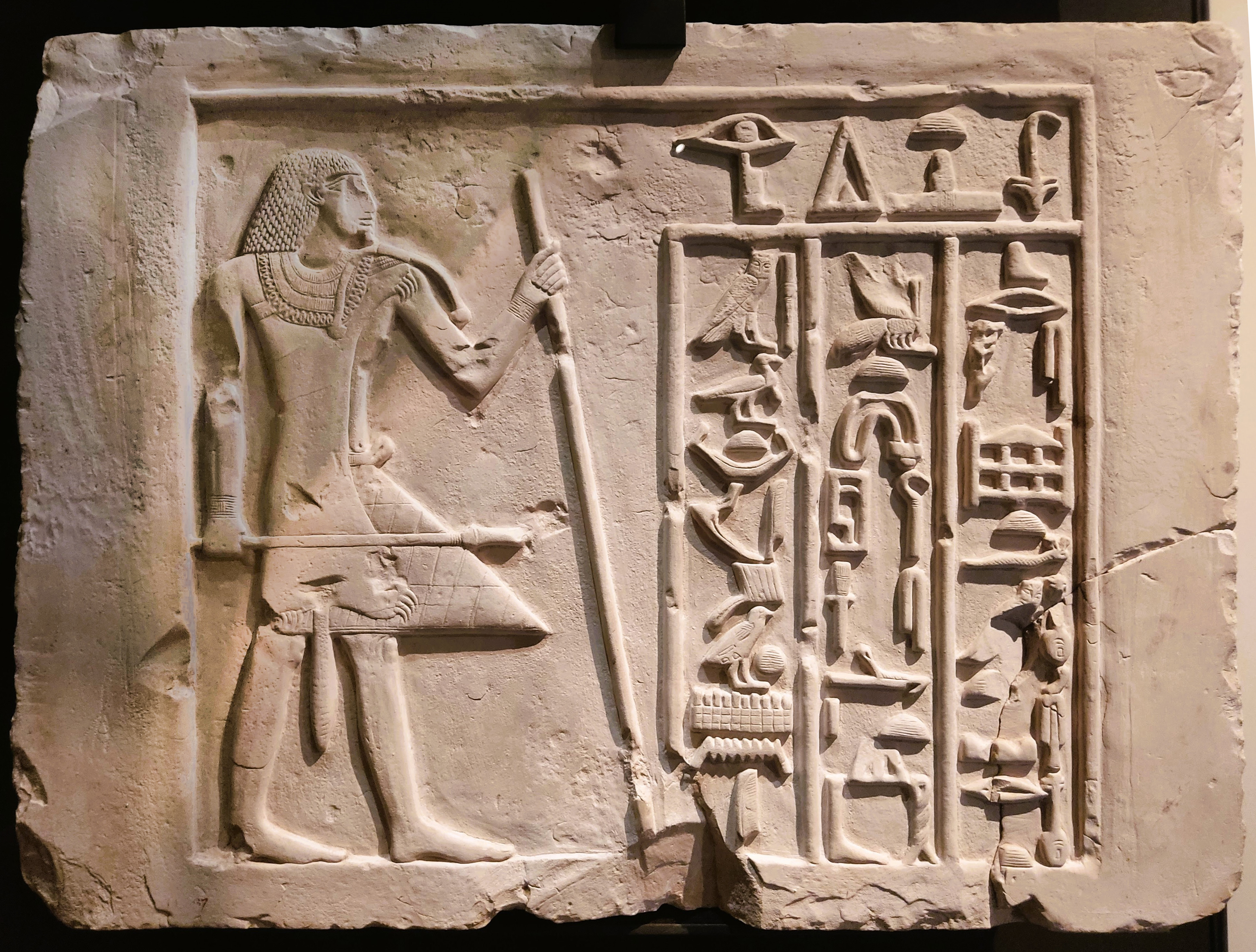
- One of the 5 stelae depicting Meni. This one is kept in the Bristol City Museum and Art Gallery.
Egyptian name
mn n iMnj< p p i i > mn n anxMen-ankh-Pepy
- Tenure: c. 2283 BC
- Dynasty: Sixth Dynasty
- Pharaoh: Pepi I and Nemtyemsaf I
- Burial: Mastaba in Dendera

Meni, Meny or Menankhpepy (also mentioned as Prince Mena in older sources; (fl. c. 2283 BC) was an ancient Egyptian high official who lived during the reigns of Pepi I and Nemtyemsaf I in the late Sixth Dynasty. Most of what is known about his life comes from his mastaba burial tomb in the Dendera Necropolis, a few hundred metres south of the Temple to Hathor. This tomb was explored during 1897 and 1898 by a team led by the British archaeologist Flinders Petrie.

Meni's full name was Men-ankh-Pepy (mn-ꜥnḫ-ppy), which can be translated as "Pepy's life is enduring" and makes reference to that king. However, in most inscriptions his name is rendered just as Meni (mnj), which was his nickname or good name.

== Life ==
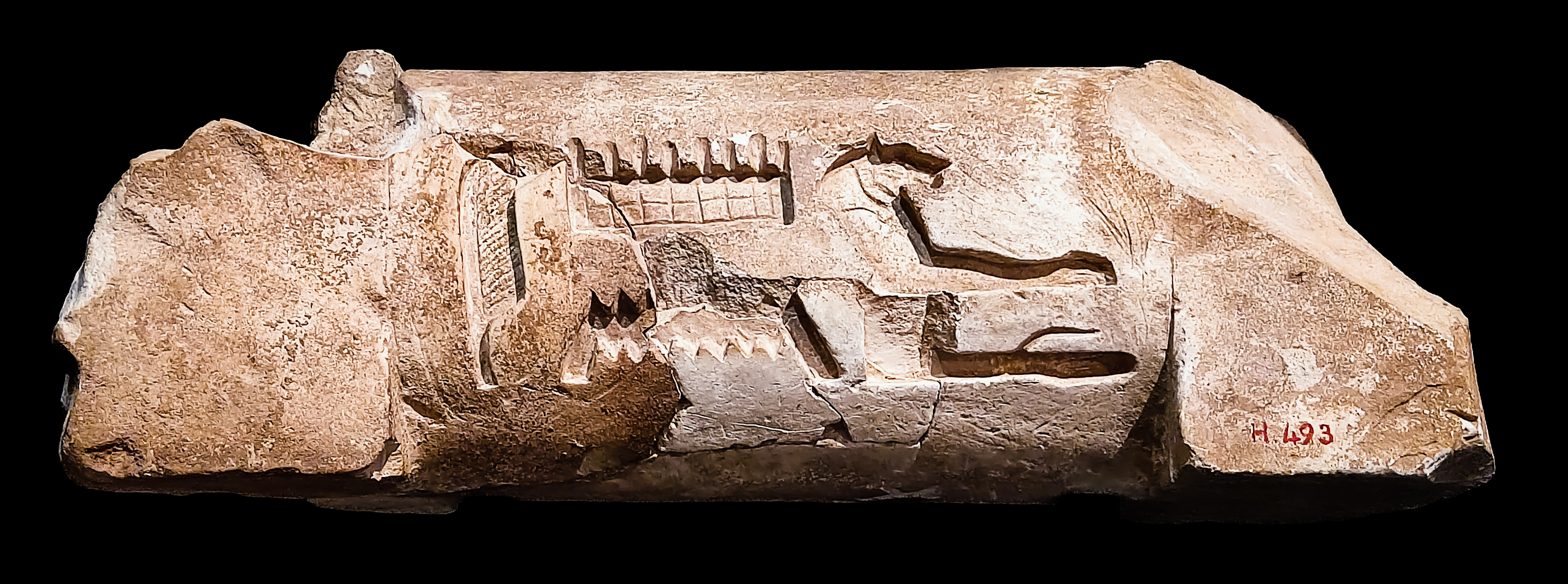
Door drum bearing the inscription "the high official Meni"

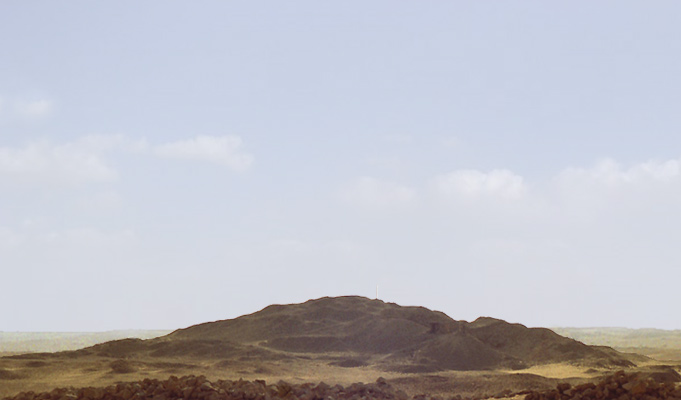
Remains of the Pyramid of Merenre in Saqqara, where Meni managed the funerary estate

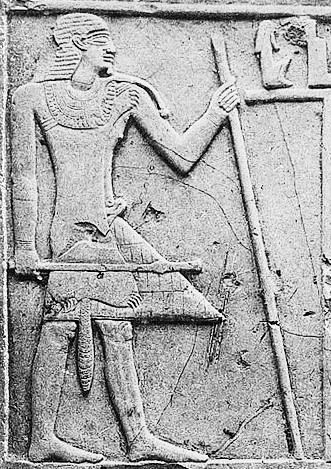
Meni as a fit young man, wearing a short kilt and a wig, clad in a leopard skin

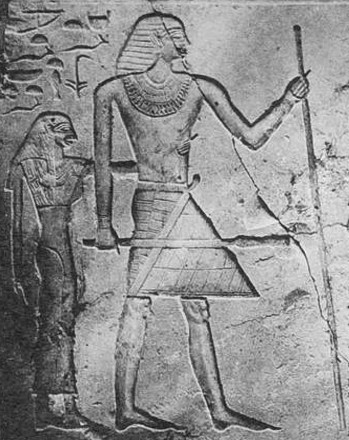
Meni and his wife. He is shown as a fit young man and is wearing a short kilt and a wig.

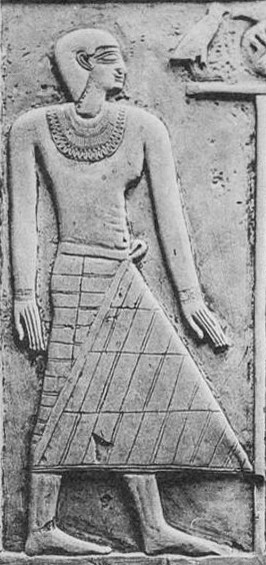
Meni as a portly elderly man, wearing a long kilt and no wig

In his tomb, Meni is shown wearing different outfits but almost always as an idealised young man. Only one stela shows him as a portly older man, which may indicate he commissioned it after reaching a relatively old age

While some authors suggested that Meni might have lived during the Ninth Dynasty (mainly on the basis of palaeography), and even the Eleventh Dynasty (based on architectural style), it seems now more probable that he lived during the late Sixth Dynasty, as his different titles appear to indicate. During his lifetime, Meni held a number of administrative titles, most of which can be associated with the pyramid estates of Sixth Dynasty kings Pepy I and Merenre. He managed the estate of both pyramid settlements, and held the office of royal seal-bearer. He is also described as a sole companion, meaning he had relatively direct access to the king, though this was a relatively low rank. Within the context of royal service, Meni is also recorded as overseer of tenant landholders of the Great House. In his local area, he was charged with supervising "all vegetation" and "every desert", as well as the "fishers, fowlers and hunters" of the nome (Dendera).

As was common at that time, he also held religious offices: he was a lector priest, and captain of the bat- or khebat-boat, an obscure term unattested elsewhere. It most likely refers to the ritual barque of Hathor, akin to the Abydos boats. The term itself (ḫbꜣt or bꜣt) may be a participle of either ḫbꜣ or bꜣ, two verbs meaning "to hack up". Thus, the name of this barque might have been "the hacked up (one)". Other people buried at Dendera had titles referring to the construction and towing of Hathor's barque, which indeed had a crew of oarsmen. Probably this is the same type of ritual barque that is recorded much later to have made a festival journey to Edfu.

A cornice inside his tomb, which was found badly damaged, includes a short biographical text in which Meni extols his good deeds, including some unusual phrases only attested in Dendera so far:

[I judged between to litigants] to their mutual satisfaction, I heard the word [of one whose throat was narrow, I kept away] evil from the needy, I saved the weak from the hand of him who was stronger than he, I held forth justice to the just [...] I was noble [...]

— Cornice of Meni's mastaba

In the corridor of his mastaba, a damaged slab was found of a man with his wife. (Note: Kept in Philadelphia, Pennsylvania University Museum E16184A.) It depicts Nebet-tef, (Note: N41 t f mr t f sw t Aa30 nb t t f ḥmt.f mr(y)t.f ẖkrt-nswt nbt-tf His beloved wife, the lady-in-waiting Nebet-tef.) together with her title of lady-in-waiting. While the name of the man is lost, the scene probably depicted Meni's wife. Likely, this slab was part of an architrave that may have included offerings and an appeal to the living along with another representation of the couple (a reconstruction can be seen below). Another inscription, badly defaced, mentions the phrase "... with barley, wheat, cattle...", which tells about accumulation of property. This may refer to Meni's private estate or may concern the temple of Hathor in Dendera, mentioned in the following line.

A full list of Meni's titles is as follows: sole companion (smr wꜥty), seal-bearer of the king of Lower Egypt (ḫtmty-bjty), overseer of tenant landholders of the Great House (jmy-rꜣ ḫntyw-š pr-ꜥꜣ), ruler of the estate (the pyramid) of "The-perfection-of-Mery-Re-abides" (ḥqꜣ ḥwt mn-nfr-mry-rꜥ), ruler of the estate (the pyramid) of "The-perfection-of-Merenre-appears" (ḥqꜣ ḥwt ḫꜥj-nfr-mr-n(y)-rꜥ), high official (ḥꜣty-ꜥ), estate manager (ḥqꜣ ḥwt), lector priest (ḫry-ḥbt), director in the barque of Hathor (ḫrp m ḫbꜣt), overseer of every cultivated place and every desert place (jmy-rꜣ kmt nb dšrt nb), overseer of fishers, fowlers and hunters of the nome (jmy-rꜣ whꜥw nww n(y) spꜣt), overseer of all vegetation of the nome (jmy-rꜣ šn-tꜣ nb n(w) spꜣt).

There is no evidence as to how many years Meni lived. One of his stelae (currently kept at the Egyptian Museum in Cairo) represents him as a portly and elderly person; in the same stela, he is wearing a long kilt, which is generally associated with portly old age in the Old Kingdom. Since such depictions are rare at Dendera, this may not be a meaningless stereotype, but an indication that he may have lived until a relative old age.

=== Possible links with individuals recorded in Giza ===
Some authors have linked this Meni with another figure of the same name who built a contemporary mastaba (possibly two) in Giza (the necropolis of ancient Memphis). The mastaba(s), now lost (but possibly S2530/2531 in the Western Cemetery), contained an alabaster offering slab bearing the names of Meni (mnj) and Menakhpepy (mn-ꜥnḫ-ppy). (Note: The full translation of the slab is as follows: Right: (1) An offering which the king gives, and Osiris: that funerary offerings may go forth to (2) one revered with Hathor Mistress of Dendera (3) the Sole Companion, Lector Priest, Overseer of Priests and Overseer of the Two Granaries (4) [Mnj] being his good name, Mn-ꜥnḫ-Ppy. Left: (1) An offering which the king gives, and Osiris: that funerary offerings may go forth to (2) one revered with Hathor Mistresss of Dendera (3) and with Horus in Dendera, She Who is Known to the King, (4) the Priestess of Hathor [Ni-ꜥnḫ]-Ḥtḥr.) The titles of this person in the inscription are: "sole companion, lector priest, overseer of priests, overseer of the two granaries", the first two also found in the tomb of Meni in Dendera. However, there is no certainty that the two are indeed the same person as they could just belong to the same family. The second inscription in the slab is devoted to a woman, the royal acquaintance and priestess of Hathor N[iankh]hathor (the name is partially erased due to wear). (Note: O10 n anx n x n[j-ꜥnḫ]-ḥwt-ḥr N[iankh]hathor.) The relation of the woman to Meni is unclear, although this type of offering slabs are typical of married couples.

In one of the Giza reliefs, this Meni appears with his wife (named Merutnes, (Note: mr w t n s merwt.n.s Merutnes.) and likely not the same person mentioned in Dendera or in the offering slab). The couple is shown receiving offerings from their children. Meni is also referred to as "elder of the house". In a separate lintel, the couple are being towed in a riverboat, piloted by their eldest son, while Merutnes smells a lotus flower. The names of the children depicted are: the scribe Aahathor, (Note: aA O10 ꜥꜣ-ḥwt-ḥr Aahathor.) Hetepnebu, (Note: Htp nbw ḥtp:nbw Hetepnebu.) Meretsit (Note: mr&r&t s t f mrtsjt Meretsit.) and Nefertjeshathor. (Note: O10 nfr S24 z nfr-ṯs-ḥwt-ḥr Nefertjeshathor.) A block for a false-door, that may come from the same mastaba(s), records the name of Meni and his mother, Neferi. (Note: nfr f r i nfrj Neferi.)

Therefore, it looks like Meni built a tomb at Giza and then another one at Dendera, both probably dating to the reign of Merenre Nemtyemsaf I. As a senior provincial official, and given that the offices of manager of the estate were almost certainly held at Memphis, it would make sense that Meni made provisions for his afterlife there. Thus, it is likely that Meni resided in the capital for several years.

== Tomb of Meni in Dendera ==
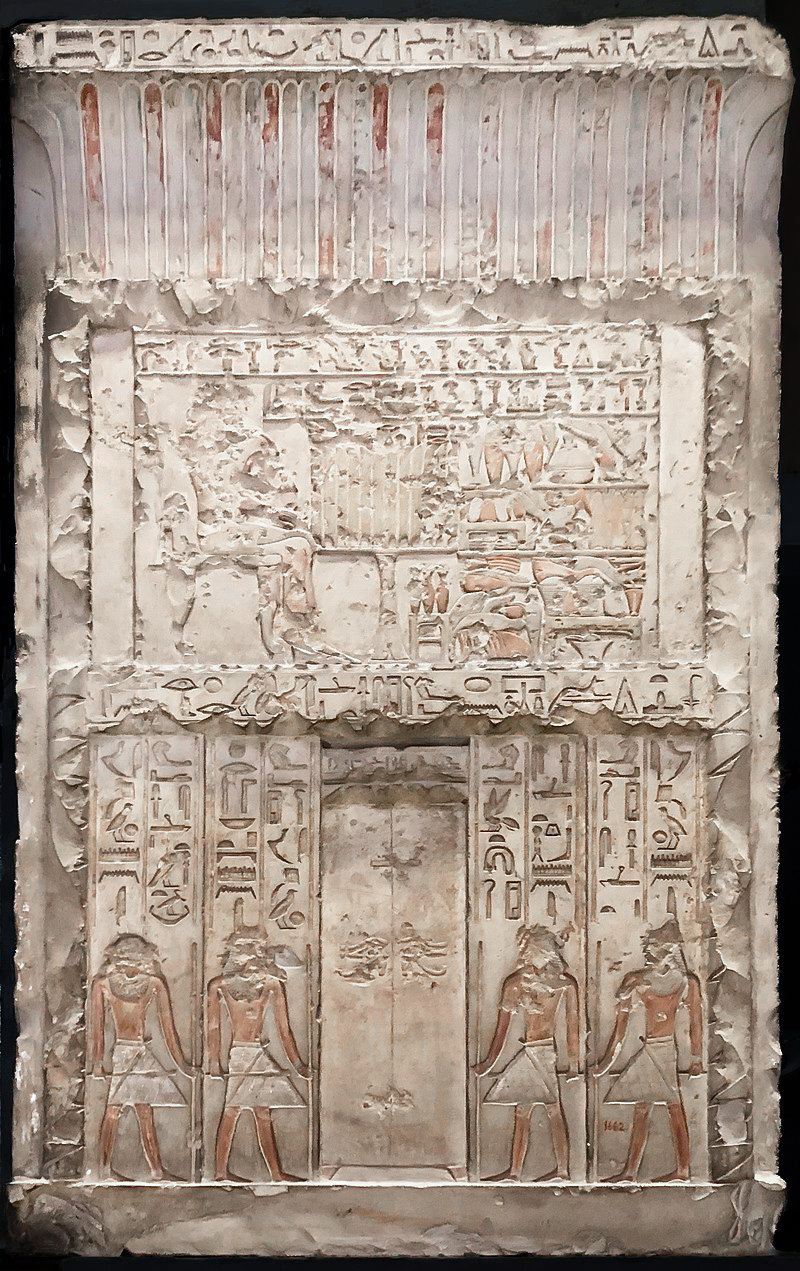
False door of Meni found at the hall of his mastaba in Dendera

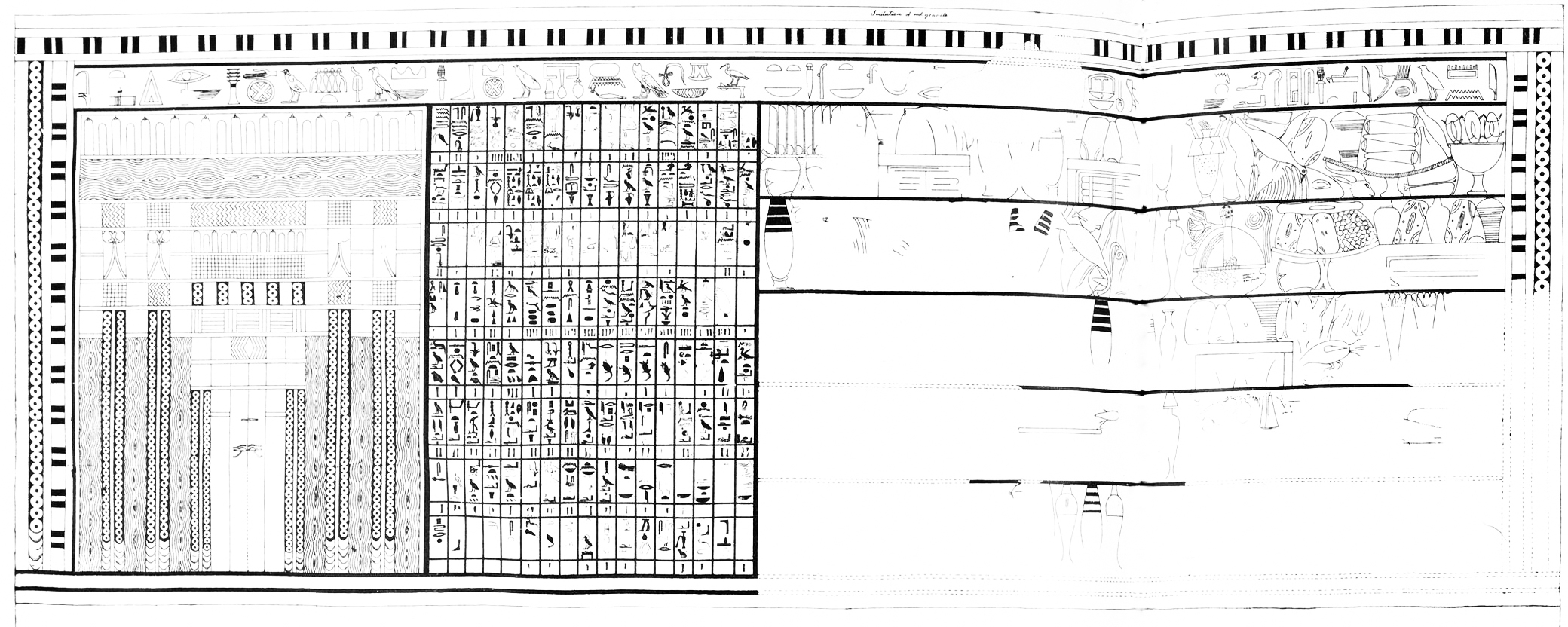
East wall of the sarcophagus chamber, including a false door and the tabulated list of offerings

Meni was buried inside a large mastaba, quite elaborate in plan, including a corridor, several wells and an open air court. Its style is similar to the mastabas of Idu I, Idu II and Mereri, also in Dendera. First explored in the late 19th century, the tomb contained a decorated false door, (Note: Kept in the Egyptian Museum 1662.) stelae, door drums and an elaborate sarcophagus chamber, among other minor finds.

The false door shows four representations of the figure of Meni, as if approaching the door in the centre. The inscriptions give his name and titles. The lintel is likewise inscribed with the same titles after a short offering, which is almost identical to the one on the cornice. Below on the left there is a representation of Meni (clad in a leopard skin) sitting before the offering table, which is spread with palm-branches and surrounded by trays of offerings. The inscription here asks for thousands of bread, beer, oxen, oryx, gooses, ducks, widgeons, pigeons, cloths, all good vegetables and all good things for the high official Meni. This scene is unusual in that it also depicts a censer with an armlike handle, followed by the words "giving incense". There remained a fragmentary lintel above it, which now kept in London.

All five limestone stelae contain similar inscriptions, with offerings to Osiris and Anubis and listing Meni's titles. Only one of the stelae contains Meni's full name. They are big limestone slabs, with high raised relief and carefully detailed hieroglyphs that stand out about 6mm deep, characteristic features of the workshops of Dendera at this time. According to Petrie, "[a]ny one of them would be a prize in any Museum in Europe". Indeed, the Egypt Exploration Fund quickly scattered them throughout several museums; at least one stayed in Egypt. (Note: The stelae are located as follows: one in the Museum of Fine Arts, Boston 98.1034, one in Manchester Museum 3503, one in the Egyptian Museum 1660, one in Bristol Museum H.487, one in the British Museum EA1262.) In most of the stelae, Meni is shown wearing a triangular, pleated kilt and a priest's leopard skin, which are rarely depicted at Dendera. He also wears bracelets, and a pectoral necklace of four strands. In all of them, Meni stands at the left, while the rest of the space is covered by the prayer. As an example, the stela held in the Bristol City Museum and Art Gallery reads:

(1) ḥtp-dj-nswt ꜣsjr (2) qrst.f nfr m jmnt nfrt (3) ḫtmty-bjty ḥqꜣ ḥwt smr wꜥty ẖry-ḥbt (4) ḫrp m (ḫ)bꜣt jmꜣḫw mnj

(1) A royal offering to Osiris: (2) may he be buried well in the goodly West, (3) the Royal seal-bearer, Chief of the estate, Sole companion, Lector priest (4) and Captain in the khebat-boat, the revered one Meni.

— Stela of Meni (Bristol, H487)

The stela in the Museum of Fine Arts, Boston has a similar inscription, translated by Ronald J. Leprohon. (Note: "[An offering which the king gi]ves, (and) Osiris (2) in all his places, that offerings be invoked for (3) the seal-bearer of the King of Lower Egypt, estate manager, sole friend, lector priest (4) the honored one before Osiris, Meni".) The stela in the Egyptian Museum has a slightly different inscription, in which Meni expresses his desire to participate in several important festivals:

(1) ḥtp-dj-nswt ꜣsjr (2) ḫnty-jmntyw nb ꜣbḏw prt-ḫrw (3) m wꜥg ḏḥwtt tpy-rnpt (4) wp rnpt ḥb zkr n ḥꜣty-ꜥ ḫtmty-bjty (5) smr wꜥty jmꜣḫw mnj

(1) A royal offering to Osiris, (2) foremost of the Westerners lord of Abydos: a voice offering (3) in the Wag festival, the festival of Thoth, the beginning of the lunar year, (4) the opening of the year, and the festival of Seker for the high official, the Royal seal-bearer, (5) and Sole companion, the revered one Meni.

— Stela of Meni (Cairo, 1660)

Twelve small false doors were carved in the walls of the mastaba, all of which had a roller, or drum over them. Two of those contained the inscription "the high official Meni" (ḥꜣtj-ꜥ mnj). (Note: One kept in the Museum of Fine Arts, Boston 98.1035, one in Bristol Museum H.493.) Other inscribed remains included a cornice with a very fragmentary autobiographical inscription, (Note: Kept in the Egyptian Museum J.d'E. 32147) as well as a possibly two fragments of a 4-piece architrave, the first from the left depicting Meni and his wife, and the third, which remained almost complete, containing an appeal to the living. (Note: Kept at the Oriental Institute (Chicago) E5028.) Finally, an unrelated, mostly defaced slab also contained a fragmentary appeal to the living and possibly some biographical information. (Note: Kept at the Oriental Institute (Chicago) E5024.)

Meni's sarcophagus or burial chamber was built of slabs. It was rough outside but finely painted inside. It contained Meni's name and titles, together with detailed lists and drawings of different offerings, which were largely vanished but were carefully copied by Petrie's team. (Note: Only two of the slabs were removed and taken to the Oriental Institute (Chicago) E5060a and E5060b.) The offerings included a tabulated list which contained everything that an Egyptian noble required for his daily personal needs: unguents, eye-paint, food, etc. Strikingly, Meni's decoration also includes a passage from the Pyramid Texts, a borrowing that wasn't attested elsewhere. The text, distributed in ten columns, deals with ritual anointing (Utterances 72-78). (Note: As a reference, here is the translation of these utterances as found in the pyramid of Unis: (72) Osiris Unis, I have filled for you your eye with oil. Recitation 4 times. "Festival-scent" oil. (73) Osiris Unis, accept the foam that is from his face. "Jubilation" oil. (74) Osiris Unis, accept Horus's eye, on which he caused devastation. Pine oil. (75) Osiris Unis, accept Horus's eye, which he rejoined. "Rejoining" oil. (76) Osiris Unis, accept Horus's eye, with which he got the gods. "Support" oil. (77) Ointment, ointment, where should you be? You on Horus's forehead, where should you be? You were on Horus's forehead, but I will put you on this Unis's forehead. You shall make it pleasant for him, wearing you; you shall akhify him, wearing you; you shall make him have control of his body; you shall put his ferocity in the eyes of all the akhs who shall look at him and everyone who hears his name as well. First-class cedar oil. (78) Osiris Unis, I have gotten for you Horus's eye, which he acquired, to your forehead. First-class Libyan oil.)

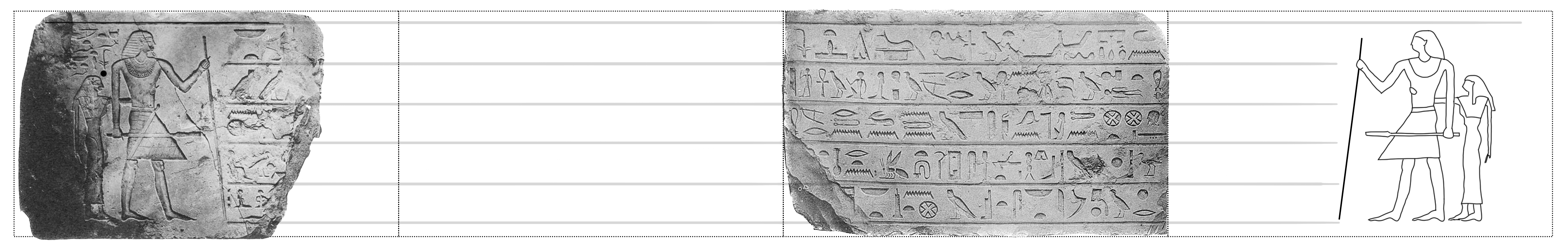
Meni's mastaba might have been topped by an architrave, including depictions of Meni and his wife, together with offerings and appeal to the living. This possible reconstruction is based on a study by Henry G. Fischer.

== Tomb of Meni in Giza ==
Inscriptions bearing the names of Meni and Menankhpepy were found in a mastaba in the Western Cemetery of Giza (known as Meni II). This may well be the same mastaba as the one known as Meni I, identified as S2530/2531, or they might have been intended as separate for a family burial complex. In Meni I eight fragments from a false door were found, inscribed with offering formulae, as well as an architrave fragment inscribed with the names of Meni and his children. Meni II contained two false-doors, (Note: Kept in Munich, Staatliche Sammlung für Ägyptische Kunst GL 024.) two panels with reliefs and inscriptions, two inscribed lintels, the upper part of jambs, three drums, (Note: Two kept in Munich, Staatliche Sammlung für Ägyptische Kunst GL 293-4.) and a block from a false-door. (Note: Kept in Munich, Staatliche Sammlung für Ägyptische Kunst GL 295.)

The reliefs do not only show Meni, but also his wife and children. One inscription also possibly mentions his mother. Among the common offering formulae, there is also a curse against tomb robbers. This curse invokes crocodiles and snakes, and reads:

(1) msḥ jr⸗f m mw ḥfꜣw jr⸗f ḥr tꜣ (2) jr.ty⸗fy ḫt jr nw (3) n-sp jr⸗j ḫt jr⸗f (4) jn nṯr wḏꜥ⸗f

(1) The crocodile is against him in the water and the snake is against him on land, (2) he who will do something against this (tomb), (3) as I have never done a thing against him. (4) It is the god who judges him.

— Curse text from the Tomb of Meni

== Bibliography ==
- Allen, James P. (2015). The Ancient Egyptian Pyramid Texts (2nd ed.). Atlanta: SBL. ISBN 978-1-62837-115-4.
- Amin, Osama Muhammed Shukir (2015-01-05). "False-Door Stela of Meni". World History Encyclopedia.
- Borchardt, Ludwig (1964). Denkmäler des Alten Reiches. Teil II (PDF). Catalogue Général des Antiquités Égyptiennes du Musée du Caire. Nº 1295-1808 (in German). Cairo: Organisme Général des Imprimeries Gouvernementales.
- Colledge, Sara Louise (2015). The Process of Cursing in Ancient Egypt (PDF). University of Liverpool.
- "EA1262 tomb-relief". British Museum.
- "EA1265 lintel". British Museum.
- Evans, Jack (2020-09-11). "Meni stela". Bristol City Museum and Art Gallery.
- Fischer, Henry George (1968). Dendera in the Third Millennium B.C. Down to the Theban Domination of Upper Egypt. New York: J. J. Augustin.
- Gilbert, Gregory P. (2004). "Three Recently Excavated Funerary Stelae from the Eighth Dynasty Tomb of Shemai at Kom El-Momanien, Qift". The Journal of Egyptian Archaeology. 90: 73–79. doi:10.1177/030751330409000105. JSTOR 3822245. S2CID 188981661.
- Kanawati, Naguib (2005). "Decoration of Burial Chambers, Sarcophagi and Coffins in the Old Kingdom". In Daoud, K.; Bedier, S.; Abd El-Fatah, S. (eds.). Studies in Honor of Ali Radwan 2. Cairo: Conseil Suprême des Antiquités de l'Égypte. pp. 55–71. ISBN 977-305-826-3.
- Leprohon, Ronald J. (2005). Texts from the Pyramid Age. Leiden, Boston: Brill. ISBN 978-90-04-13048-7.
- "Meni [I]". Digital Giza. The Giza Project at Harvard University.
- "Meni [II]". Digital Giza. The Giza Project at Harvard University.
- Moreno García, Juan Carlos (2014). "Invaders or just herders? Libyans in Egypt in the third and second millennia BCE". World Archaeology. 46 (4): 610–623. doi:10.1080/00438243.2014.931820. S2CID 219614187.
- Petrie, William Matthew Flinders (1898). Petrie Journal 1897 to 1898 pages 51-100. Griffith Institute Archive.
- Petrie, William Matthew Flinders (1900). Dendereh 1898. London: The Egypt Exploration Fund.
- Porter, Bertha; Moss, Rosalind (1937). Topographical Bibliography of Ancient Egyptian Hieroglyphic Texts, Reliefs and Paintings. V. Upper Egypt: Sites. Oxford: Griffith Institute. Ashmolean Museum.
- Porter, Bertha; Moss, Rosalind (1974). Málek, Jaromír (ed.). Topographical Bibliography of Ancient Egyptian Hieroglyphic Texts, Reliefs and Paintings. III. Memphis (2nd ed.). Oxford: Clarendon Press.
- Shafik, Sameh (2020). "The provincial policies of Teti, Pepy I and Merenre in Upper Egypt" (PDF). International Journal of Heritage, Tourism and Hospitality. 14 (2): 61–73. doi:10.21608/ijhth.2020.154172. S2CID 234572993.
- Sinclair, Neil (2013). The development and decline of provincial rule from the Old to the Middle Kingdom: an analysis of the tombs and titles of the senior officials of Upper Egypt. Macquarie University.
- Stefanović, Danijela (2009). "Stela Bolton 1920.10.12 The Non-Royal Women of the Middle Kingdom II (H̱krt Nswt, Bꜣkt Nt Ḥḳꜣ, and Ꜥnḫt Nt Tpt Nswt)". Studien zur Altägyptischen Kultur. 38: 297–309. JSTOR 3822245.
- "Stele of Meny". Museum of Fine Arts, Boston.
- "Unbekannt: Scheintürfragmente des Meni". bavarikon (in German).

== See also ==
- Dendera Temple complex
- Art of Ancient Egypt
- Nyibunesu
- Stele
