= Fernando Menis =

Spanish architect

- Born: 15 June 1951 (age 74); Santa Cruz de Tenerife, Spain
- Occupation: Architect
- Practice: Fernando Menis S.L.P.U.
- Projects: Magma Art&Congress; Multifunctional Concert Hall "Jordanki"; Sacred Museum and Plaza de España in Adeje; Bürchen Mystik; Holy Redeemer Church; Insular Athletics Stadium; Presidency of the Government of the Canary Islands

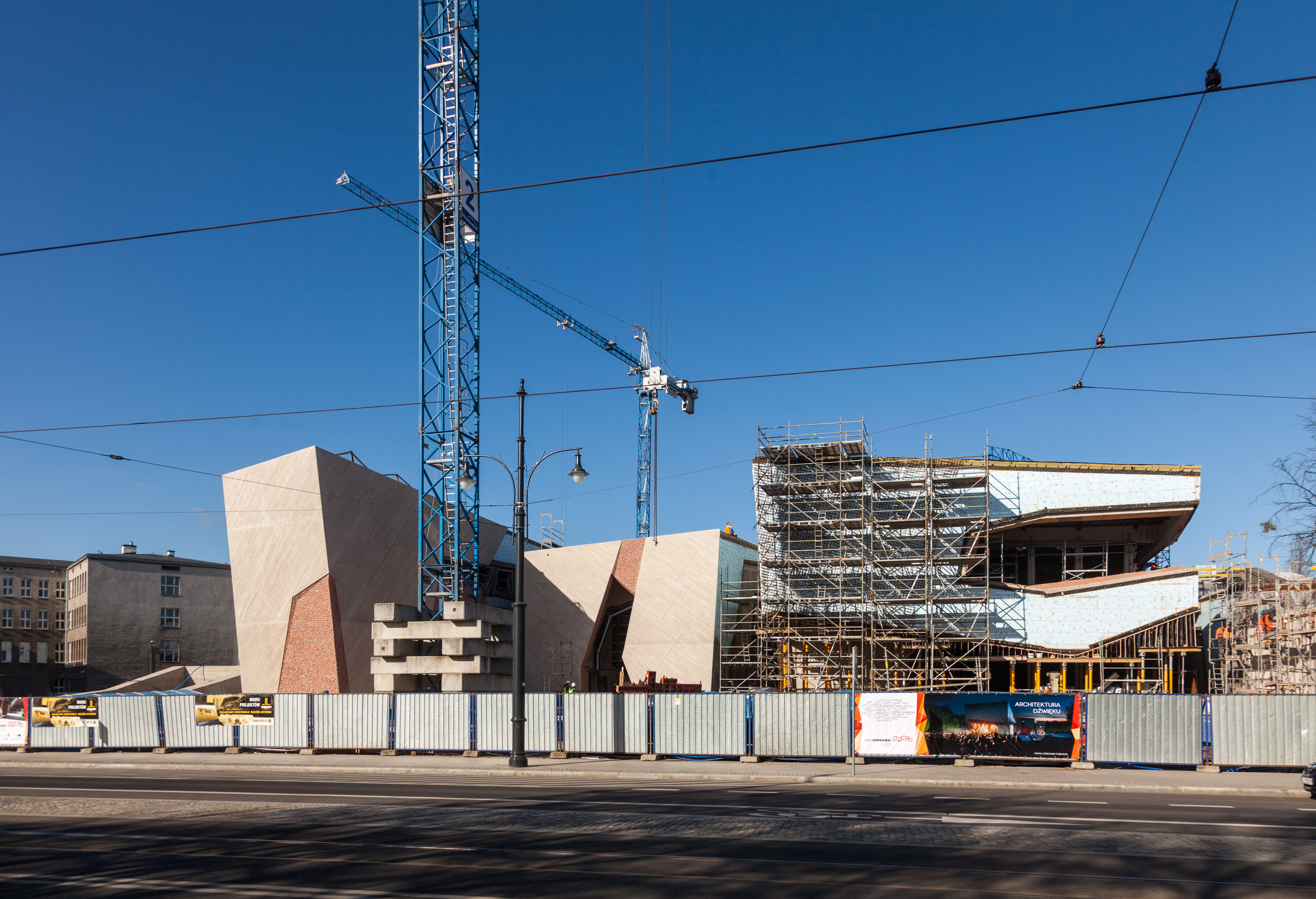
Multifuncional Concert Hall "Jordanki" in Toruń, Poland (under construction)

Fernando Martín Menis, better known as Fernando Menis (born June 15, 1951), is a Spanish architect. He graduated from the Barcelona Institute of Architecture. He serves as the Chairman of the Laboratory for Innovation in Architecture, Design and Advanced Tourism of Tenerife. He is also a professor at the European University of the Canary Islands (EUC) and, occasionally, serves as a guest speaker at International Congresses of Architecture and Universities (such as Harvard, Technische Universität Berlin, Columbia University etc).

== Early life and education ==
Perhaps to understand the professional moment Menis lives in, we have to go back to his childhood where he "used to help [his] father when making [his] own toys with recycled materials", something that later developed in his high school years, as he used to spend hours dreaming of shapes in soft materials, such as wax candles. Menis often describes this as his inspiration to study architecture later in College. He started his University journey in Las Palmas de Gran Canaria and finished his degree in Barcelona. Menis remembers those as some very exciting years in his life due to democracy being about to be established in Spain, which made the desire of incredible freedom and collective joy contagious. His two main inspirations where his then professors Pep Bonet and Rafael Cáceres, who "opened [his] dreams and brought common sense and harmony" into his work. Once he graduated, he moved to Paris and started working with Ricardo Bofill in the first period of his architectural studio. This gave him the opportunity to meet new friends and learn from a European world that was very different from what he had been used to in Spain. It is in Paris where he learns and participates in several competitions, such as La Villette, something that stimulates his pleasure of teamwork that surpasses itself in order to offer the best solution for a project. A few years after returning to the island (Tenerife, Islas Canarias), he met Dulce Xerach (a lawyer, doctor in architecture and a crime novel writer) with whom he has been married twice. First in 2003, divorced in 2007 and second wedding in 2014). They live in a house designed by the own Menis, Casa MM, in Santa Cruz de Tenerife.His wife has written 3 books inspired in the placed she has visited with Menis for work: Robbery in Sao Paulo, Murder on a London Beach and Kidnapping in Hong Kong, all of the same serie, in which the protagonist is a Spanish police inspector named María Anchieta.

== Representative projects ==
- Tank, garden around the cultural space, Gada Award, New Delhi, Rehinking the future. 2018
- Hatching - The Origination of a City (Venice Architecture Biennale 2014 – Morocco Pavilion FUNDAMENTAL-(ISM)S.).
- Bürchen Mystik (Switzerland, under construction).
- Multifunctional Concert Hall "Jordanki" in Toruń (Poland, 2015).
- Magma Art & Congress (Adeje, Spain, 2005).
- Holy Redeemer Church (San Cristóbal de La Laguna, Spain, under construction).
- Sacred Museum and Plaza de España in Adeje (Spain, 2010).
- Swimming Pool in Spree River (Berlin, 2004).
- Presidency of The Government of The Canary Islands (Santa Cruz de Tenerife, Spain, 1999).
- Casa MM, in Santa Cruz de Tenerife 1998.
- Tank, the cultural space, an industrial heritage tank of oil transformed into a cultural space, 1997.
- Auditorium in Toruń, Poland, CKK Jordanki (2015)
- Public Garden around the Tank cultural space (2022)

== Honours and awards ==
- 1982-83: Awarded First Prize Manuel de Oráa - Project: Texaco Service Station, Santa Cruz de Tenerife, Spain.
- 1988-89: Awarded Second Prize Manuel de Oráa - Project: La Vigilia Apartment, San Miguel, Spain.
- 1992-93: Awarded First Prize ex-aequo Manuel de Oráa - Project: Ana Bautista Sports Complex, Santa Cruz de Tenerife, Spain.
- 1992-93: Awarded First Prize ex-aequo Manuel de Oráa - Project: San Agustin Hall of Residence, San Cristóbal de La Laguna, Spain.
- 1994: Finalist at the IBERFAD Awards - Project: Proa Building, Santa Cruz de Tenerife, Spain.
- 1994-95: Accesit Manuel de Oráa - Project: Proa Building, Santa Cruz de Tenerife, Spain.
- 1998: Selected Work at IBERFAD Awards - Project: El Tanque Cultural Space, Santa Cruz de Tenerife, Spain.
- 1998: Awarded First Prize Manuel de Oráa - Project: MM House, Santa Cruz de Tenerife, Spain.
- 1998-99: Awarded the Spanish Architecture Biennale Award - Project: El Tanque Cultural Space, Santa Cruz de Tenerife, Spain.
- 1998-99: Awarded First Prize Manuel de Oráa - Project: El Tanque Cultural Space, Santa Cruz de Tenerife, Spain.
- 1999: Finalist at the FAD Awards - Project: MM House, Santa Cruz de Tenerife, Spain.
- 1999-00: Awarded First Prize Manuel de Oráa - Project: Presidency of the Canary Islands Government, Santa Cruz de Tenerife, Spain.
- 2000: Awarded First Prize of the National Architecture and Design Awards - Project: Presidency of the Canary Islands Government, Santa Cruz de Tenerife, Spain.
- 2002: Selected Work at the 8th Edition of the Venice Architecture Biennale Awards - Project: Presidency of the Canary Islands Government, Santa Cruz deTenerife, Spain.
- 2003: Awarded at the 13th Edition of the "Architecture in Stone” International Awards - Project: Presidency of the Canary Islands Government, Santa Cruz de Tenerife, Spain.
- 2003: Selected Work at IBERFAD - Project: 11 Apartments in El Guicho, Spain.
- 2004-05: First Prize ex aequo Manuel de Oráa - Project: Magma Art & Congress, San Miguel, Spain.
- 2005: Finalist at the 8th Edition of the Spanish Architecture Biennale Awards - Project: Swimming Pool in Spree River, Berlin, Germany.
- 2006: Finalist at the 4th Edition of the European Prize for Urban Public Space - Project: Swimming Pool in Spree River, Berlin, Germany.
- 2006: Selected Work at the 11th Edition of the Venice Architecture Biennale Awards - Project: Swimming Pool in Spree River, Berlin, Germany.
- 2006: Finalist at the FAD 2006 Awards - Project: Magma Art & Congress, Spain.
- 2006-07: Awarded First Prize and Special Award Manuel de Oráa - Project: Insular Athletics Stadium, Spain.
- 2007: Finalist at the 9th Edition of the Spanish Architecture Biennale Awards - Project: Magma Art & Congress, Spain.
- 2007: Awarded "Simproni Accessibility Architecture" First Prize - Project: Magma Art & Congress, Spain.
- 2007: Selected Work at the Spanish Architecture Awards - Project: Magma Art & Congress, Spain.
- 2007: Nominated for Mies van der Rohe Awards - Project: Magma Art & Congress, Spain.
- 2007: Honourable Mention at the 11th Edition of the "Architecture in Stone” Awards - Project Insular Athletics Stadium, Spain.
- 2008: Finalist at the Manuel de Oráa Award - Project: 4th phase of the Cuchillitos Park, Spain.
- 2010: Awarded World Architectural Festival (WAF) First Prize in the "Future Cultural Projects" category - Project: Multifunctional Concert Hall "Jordanki" in Toruń, Poland.
- 2011: Finalist at the World Architecture Festival (WAF) in the "Future Cultural Projects" category - Project: Auditorium in Pájara, Fuerteventura, Spain.
- 2012: Awarded Ambuja Cement Foundation 2012 Award for Innovation in Architecture - Project: Holy Redeemer Church, San Cristóbal de La Laguna, Spain.
- 2012: Finalist at the European Prize for Urban Public Space - Project: Sacred Museum and Plaza of Spain in Adeje, Spain.
- 2012: Awarded World Architecture Festival (WAF) First Prize in the “New & Old” category and the Director’s Special Award - Project: Sacred Museum and Plaza of Spain in Adeje, Spain.
- 2014: Finalist at the World Architecture Festival (WAF) - Project: Bürchen Mystik, Switzerland.
- 2016: Finalist, World Architecture Festival Intl. Awards (WAF), category - Landscape, Germany. - Project: Bürchen Public Space in Büchen, Switzerland.
- 2016: Finalist, European Award for Urban Public Space. - Project: Bürchen Public Space in Büchen, Switzerland.
- 2016: Jury Prize, Taipei Intl. Design Award, Public Space Design category, Taiwan. - Project: Bürchen Public Space in Büchen, Switzerland.
- 2016: New Wonder of Poland, Contest of the New 7 Wonders in Poland, National Geographic, Poland. - Project: CKK "Jordanki" in Toruń, Poland.
- 2016: Nomination, Modernizacja Awards, category New Urban Building, Poland. - Project: CKK "Jordanki" in Toruń, Poland.
- 2016: Finalist, World Architecture Festival Intl. Awards (WAF), Cultural category, Germany. - Project: CKK "Jordanki" in Toruń, Poland.
- 2016: Finalist, XIII Spanish Biennial of Architecture, category - "Product”. - Project: Picado, CKK "Jordanki" in Toruń, Poland.
- 2016: Finalist, Architecture Awards of the POLITYKA newspaper, Poland. - Project: CKK "Jordanki" in Toruń, Poland.
- 2016: Special Award for Universal Accessibility, CEMEX Building Awards, Mexico. - Project: CKK "Jordanki" in Toruń, Poland.
- 2016: Gold Award for Best Public Building, Taipei International Design Award, Taiwan. - Project: CKK "Jordanki" in Toruń, Poland.
- 2016: Best Concrete Building Award, World Architecture News Intl. Awards (WAN), United Kingdom, 2016 Award for Best Cultural Building, BUILD Architecture Awards, UK - Project: CKK "Jordanki" in Toruń, Poland.
- 2016: ICONIC Award, category - Public Building, Germany - Project: CKK "Jordanki" in Toruń, Poland.
- 2016: Award for Best Cultural Building in Poland, SARP Awards (Association of Polish Architects) - Project: CKK "Jordanki" in Toruń, Poland.
- 2016: Jury Prize, BRYŁA Awards, Poland - Project: CKK "Jordanki" in Toruń, Poland.
- 2016: Zlota Kareta Award, NOWOSCI newspaper, Poland - Project: CKK "Jordanki" in Toruń, Poland.
- 2018: Gada (Global Architecture and Design Awards, India)to the garden around the Tank Industrial Cultural Space, Tenerife, Canary Island, Spain
