= List of geological features on Venus =

Features present in the geology of Venus

Venus, the second planet from the Sun, is classified as a terrestrial planet. It is sometimes called Earth's "sister planet" due to their similar size, gravity, and bulk composition (Venus is both the closest planet to Earth and the planet closest in size to Earth). The surface of Venus is covered by a dense atmosphere and presents clear evidence of former violent volcanic activity. It has shield and composite volcanoes similar to those found on Earth.

== Valles ==
Cytherean valleys are called by the Latin term valles, and are named after river goddesses or after words for the planet Venus (including terms for the morning star or evening star specifically) in various languages.

Name	Latitude	Longitude	Diameter (km)	Year named	Name origin
Ahsabkab Vallis	24.0S	79.0E	700.0	2000	Mayan name for morning Venus.
Alajen Vallis	3.3S	337.1E	200.0	2000	Alajen, a Talysh river deity.
Albys Vallis	39.5S	30.5E	240.0	1997	Albys, a Tuvan/Altay river deity.
Anuket Vallis	66.7N	8.0E	350.0	1994	Anuket, an Egyptian river goddess.
Apisuahts Vallis	66.5S	17.0E	550.0	1997	Blackfoot/Algonquian name for planet Venus.
Austrina Vallis	49.5S	177.0E	600.0	1997	Austriņa, Latvian name for planet Venus.
Avfruvva Vallis	2.0N	70.0E	70.0	1994	Avfruvva, a Saami river goddess.
Baltis Vallis	37.3N	161.4E	6,000.0	1994	Syrian word for planet Venus.
Banumbirr Vallis	7.0S	4.0E	400.0	1997	Arnhem Land Aboriginal word for planet Venus.
Bastryk Vallis	7.5S	347.5E	190.0	2000	Bastryk, a Kumyk river deity.
Bayara Vallis	45.6N	16.5E	500.0	1994	Dogon word for planet Venus.
Belisama Vallis	50.0N	22.5E	220.0	1994	Belisama, a Celtic river goddess.
Bennu Vallis	1.3N	341.2E	710.0	1994	Egyptian word for planet Venus.
Chasca Vallis	52.8S	359.0E	400.0	1997	Quechua name for planet Venus.
Citlalpul Vallis	51.8S	187.0E	3,160.0	1994	Aztec name for planet Venus.(Name changed from Citlalpul Valles.)
Dilbat Vallis	55.0S	184.0E	420.0	2000	Assyro-Babylonian name for planet Venus.
Dzyzlan Vallis	16.0S	182.0E	250.0	1997	Dzyzlan, an Abkhazian river goddess.
Fara Vallis	1.2S	345.5E	260.0	2000	Fara, a Malagasy water goddess.
Fetu-ao Vallis	61.0S	254.7E	400.0	1997	Samoan name for planet Venus.
Fufei Vallis	46.0N	341.0E	170.0	1997	Fufei, a Chinese goddess of the Lo River.
Ganga Valles	4.8N	53.0E	200.0	2006	Ganga, a Hindu goddess of the sacred river Ganges.
Gendenwitha Vallis	63.0S	259.0E	900.0	1997	Iroquois name for planet Venus.
Helmud Vallis	33.9S	171.3E	280.0	1997	Helmud, an Afghan river goddess.
Hoku-ao Vallis	28.0N	166.5E	450.0	1997	Hawaiian name for planet Venus.
Ikhwezi Vallis	16.0N	147.8E	1,700.0	1997	Zulu name for planet Venus.
Jutrzenka Vallis	27.0N	155.8E	970.0	1997	Polish name for planet Venus.
Kallistos Vallis	51.1S	21.5E	900.0	1994	Ancient Greek name for planet Venus.
Khalanasy Vallis	51.0S	168.5E	320.0	1997	Khalanasy, an Azeri river mermaid.
Kimtinh Vallis	46.5S	67.0E	550.0	2000	Vietnamese word for planet Venus.
Kinsei Vallis	13.6N	141.0E	800.0	1997	Japanese name for planet Venus.
Koidutäht Vallis	76.5S	130.0E	700.0	1997	Estonian name for planet Venus.
Kumanyefie Vallis	80.5S	335.0E	600.0	1997	Ewe name for planet Venus.
Kŭmsŏng Vallis	59.0S	152.5E	700.0	1997	Korean name for planet Venus (금성).
Laidamlulum Vallis	73.0S	151.0E	2,700.0	2000	Maidu name for morning Venus.
Lo Shen Valles	12.8S	89.6E	225.0	1994	Lo Shen, a Chinese river goddess.
Lunang Vallis	68.2N	310.0E	250.0	1997	Lunang, a Nuristani goddess of the Parun River.
Lusaber Vallis	47.5S	164.0E	500.0	1997	Armenian name for planet Venus.
Martuv Vallis	23.0N	156.0E	250.0	1997	Martuv, Kyrgyz river deity.
Matlalcue Vallis	33.0S	167.5E	300.0	1997	Matlalcue, an Aztec fresh water goddess.
Merak Vallis	63.5S	162.0E	200.0	1997	Merak, a Baloch river deity.
Morongo Valles	20.0S	111.4E	660.0	2003	Makoni name of Venus as evening star.
Nahid Valles	55.1S	171.0E	500.0	1997	Persian name for planet Venus.
Nantosuelta Vallis	61.9S	193.0E	320.0	1997	Nantosuelta, a Celtic river goddess.
Nepra Vallis	1.4N	24.2E	350.0	1997	Nepra, an East Slavic goddess of the Dnieper River.
Ngyandu Vallis	62.0S	12.0E	500.0	1997	Swahili name for planet Venus.
Nommo Valles	40.7S	87.3E	200.0	2000	Nommo, Dogon water deities.
Nyakaio Vallis	47.5N	339.0E	150.0	1997	Nyakaio, Shilluk river deity.
Olokun Vallis	81.5N	269.0E	150.0	1997	Olokun, Bini sea and river deity.
Omutnitsa Vallis	33.0N	292.0E	150.0	1997	Omutnitsa, East Slavic river deity.
Poranica Valles	21.0S	178.5E	550.0	1997	Named after a supposedly Slovene word for Venus according to the official astronomical naming body, although neither Slovene dictionaries nor Slovene corpora include this word.(Name changed from Poranica Vallis.)
Saga Vallis	76.1N	340.6E	450.0	1994	Saga, Norse goddess in the form of a waterfall.
Samundra Vallis	24.1S	347.1E	110.0	1994	Samundra, Indian river goddess.
Sati Vallis	3.2N	334.4E	225.0	1994	Sati, Egyptian river goddess.
Sezibwa Vallis	44.0S	37.0E	300.0	1997	Sezibwa, Ganda river spirit.
Sholpan Vallis	63.9S	150.0E	590.0	2003	Kazakh and Karakalpak name of planet Venus.
Sinann Vallis	49.0S	270.0E	425.0	1994	Sinann, an Irish river goddess.
Taꞌurua Vallis	80.2S	247.5E	525.0	1994	Tahitian word for the planet Venus.
Tai-pe Valles	11.0N	156.5E	400.0	1997	Chinese name for planet Venus.
Tan-yondozo Vallis	41.5S	87.0E	800.0	1997	Bashkir name for planet Venus.
Tapati Vallis	27.0N	304.0E	150.0	1997	Tapati, Indian goddess of the Tapti River
Tawera Vallis	11.6S	67.5E	500.0	1997	Māori name for planet Venus.
Tingoi Vallis	6.0N	318.6E	250.0	1997	Tingoi, a Mandé river spirit.
Umaga Valles	49.0S	152.0E	400.0	1997	Old Tagal name for planet Venus.
Uottakh-sulus Valles	12.5N	239.0E	1,100.0	1997	Yakutian/Sakha name for planet Venus.
Utrenitsa Vallis	55.0N	280.0E	700.0	1997	Old Russian name for planet Venus.
Vakarine Vallis	5.0N	336.4E	625.0	1994	Lithuanian word for planet Venus.
Veden-Ema Vallis	15.0S	141.0E	300.0	1997	Veden-Ema, a Finnish goddess of fishing.
Vesper Vallis	59.3S	180.0E	610.0	2000	Latin name for evening Venus.
Vishera Vallis	33.1S	161.6E	300.0	2003	Vishera, a legendary Komi-Permyak girl who turned into the Vishera River.
Xulab Vallis	57.5S	186.0E	820.0	1997	Mayan name for planet Venus.
Ymoja Vallis	71.6S	204.8E	390.0	1994	Ymoja, a Yoruba river goddess.
Yuvkha Valles	10.5N	239.5E	200.0	1997	Yuvkha, a Turkmens river spirit.

== Undae ==
Undae, dune fields, are named after desert goddesses.

Name	Latitude	Longitude	Diameter (km)	Year named	Name origin
Al-Uzza Undae	67.7N	90.5E	150	1994	Al-‘Uzzá, Arabian desert goddess.
Menat Undae	24.8S	339.4E	100	1994	Menat, Arabian desert goddess.

== Tesserae ==
Tesserae are areas of polygonal terrain. They are named after goddesses in world mythologies.

Name	Latitude	Longitude	Diameter (km)	Year named	Name origin
Adrasthea Tesserae	30.0N	55.0E	750.0	1997	Adrastea, Greek goddess of law.
Ananke Tessera	53.3N	137.0E	1,060.0	1985	Ananke, Greek goddess of necessity.
Athena Tessera	35.0N	175.0E	1,800.0	1997	Athena, Greek goddess of wisdom.
Atropos Tessera	71.5N	304.0E	469.0	1985	Atropos, one of the Fates in Greek mythology.
Bathkol Tessera	61.0N	200.0E	1,485.0	1997	Bathkol, Israeli goddess of fate.
Chimon-mana Tessera	3.0S	270.0E	1,500.0	1997	Chimon-mana, Hopi goddess of the insane.
Clidna Tessera	42.0S	29.0E	500.0	1997	Clidna, an Irish bird goddess of the afterlife.
Clotho Tessera	56.4N	334.9E	289.0	1985	Clotho, one of the Fates in Greek mythology
Cocomama Tessera	62.0S	23.0E	1,600.0	1997	Kuka Mama, an Inca goddess of happiness.
Dekla Tessera	57.4N	71.8E	1,363.0	1985	Dēkla, Latvian goddess of fate.
Dolya Tessera	8.0S	296.0E	1,100.0	1997	Dolya, East Slavic good fate goddess.
Dou-Mu Tesserae	60.0S	244.0E	400.0	1997	Dou-Mu, Chinese life/death ruling goddess.
Fortuna Tessera	69.9N	45.1E	2,801.0	1985	Fortuna, a Roman goddess of chance.
Gbadu Tessera	1.0S	38.0E	700.0	1997	Gbadu, a Fon goddess of guessing.
Gegute Tessera	17.0N	121.0E	1,600.0	1997	Gegute, a Lithuanian goddess of time.
Giltine Tesserae	39.0S	250.0E	300.0	1997	Giltine, a Lithuanian bad fate goddess.
Haasttse-baad Tessera	6.0N	127.0E	2,600.0	1997	Haasttse-badd, a Navajo good health goddess.
Hikuleo Tesserae	42.0S	54.0E	1,400.0	1997	Hikuleo, a Tongan underworld goddess.
Humai Tessera	53.0S	250.0E	350.0	1997	Humai, an Iranian legendary bird of happiness.
Husbishag Tesserae	28.0S	101.0E	1,100.0	1997	Husbishag, a Semitic underworld goddess
Itzpapalotl Tessera	75.7N	317.6E	380.0	1985	Itzpapalotl, Aztec goddess of fate.
Kruchina Tesserae	36.0N	27.0E	1,000.0	1997	Kruchina, East Slavic goddess of sadness.
Kutue Tessera	39.5N	108.8E	653.0	1985	Kutue, a toad in Ulch folklore that brings happiness.
Lachesis Tessera	44.4N	300.1E	664.0	1985	Lachesis, one of the three Fates in Greek mythology.
Lahevhev Tesserae	29.0N	189.0E	1,300.0	1997	Lahevhev, Melanesian dead souls goddess.
Laima Tessera	55.0N	48.5E	971.0	1985	Laima, Latvian and Lithuanian goddess of fate.
Lhamo Tessera	51.0S	15.0E	800.0	1997	Lhamo, Tibetan time and fate goddess.
Likho Tesserae	40.0N	134.0E	1,200.0	1997	Likho, East Slavic deity of bad fate.
Mafdet Tessera	9.2N	38.5E	370.0	2003	Mafdet, Egyptian goddess of judicial authority and executions.
Mago-Halmi Tesserae	70.0N	157.0E	400.0	1997	Mago-Halmi, Korean helping goddess.
Magu Tessera	52.0S	305.0E	300.0	1997	Magu, Chinese goddess of immortality.
Mamitu Tesserae	22.0N	44.0E	900.0	1997	Mamitu, Akkadian destiny goddess.
Manatum Tessera	4.0S	64.0E	3,800.0	1997	Manatum, Semitic goddess of fate.
Manzan-Gurme Tesserae	39.0N	359.5E	1,354.0	1985	Manzan-Gurme, ancestress who possesses the book of fate in Mongol, Tibetan, and Buryat mythologies.
Meni Tessera	48.1N	77.9E	454.0	1985	Meni, Semitic goddess of fate.
Meskhent Tessera	65.8N	103.1E	1,056.0	1985	Meskhenet, Egyptian goddess of fortune.
Minu-Anni Tessera	20.0S	30.0E	1,300.0	1997	Minu-Anni, Assyrian fate goddess.
Moira Tessera	58.7N	310.5E	361.0	1985	The Moirai, Greek fate goddess.
Nedolya Tesserae	5.0N	294.0E	1,200.0	1997	Nedolya, East Slavic bad fate goddess.
Nemesis Tesserae	40.0N	181.0E	355.0	1985	Nemesis, Greek goddess of fate.
Norna Tesserae	50.0S	263.0E	700.0	1997	The Norns, Norse fate goddesses
Nortia Tesserae	49.0S	160.0E	650.0	1997	Nortia, Etruscan fate goddess.
Nuahine Tessera	9.0S	157.0E	1,000.0	1997	Nuahine, Rapanui fate goddess.
Oddibjord Tessera	82.0N	85.0E	900.0	1997	Oddibjord, Scandinavian fortune deity.
Pasom-mana Tesserae	33.0S	49.0E	1,200.0	1997	Pasom-mana, Hopi goddess of dreams and the insane.
Salus Tessera	1.5S	48.5E	850.0	1997	Salus, Roman health and prosperity goddess.
Senectus Tesserae	50.0N	292.0E	1,400.0	1997	Senectus, Roman goddess of old age.
Shait Tessera	54.0S	173.5E	220.0	1997	Shait, Egyptian human destiny goddess.
Shimti Tessera	31.9N	97.7E	1,275.0	1985	Shimti, the incarnation of Ishtar as the goddess of fate in Babylonian mythology.
Snotra Tesserae	24.0N	134.0E	1,000.0	1997	Snotra, Scandinavian goddess of wisdom.
Sopdet Tesserae	45.0S	243.0E	500.0	1997	Sopdet, Egyptian goddess of the Sirius star and the forthcoming year.
Sudenitsa Tesserae	33.0N	270.0E	4,200.0	1997	Slavic fate deities (three sisters).
Sudice Tessera	37.0S	112.0E	500.0	1997	Czech goddess of fate.
Tellus Tessera	42.6N	76.8E	2,329.0	1982	Greek Titaness
Tushita Tesserae	42.0S	54.0E	1,400.0	2000	Hindu deity of resignation to fate. Name changed from Hikuleo Tesserae.
Tyche Tessera	44.0S	14.5E	575.0	1997	Tyche, Greek goddess of fate.
Urd Tessera	40.0S	174.5E	250.0	1997	Urðr, Norse fate goddess.
Ustrecha Tesserae	43.0S	265.0E	450.0	1997	Old Russian goddess of chance.
Vako-nana Tesserae	27.0N	40.0E	1,200.0	1997	Adygan wise predictor.
Verpeja Tesserae	58.0S	160.0E	600.0	1997	Verpėja, Lithuanian life thread goddess.
Virilis Tesserae	56.1N	239.7E	782.0	1985	One of the names of Fortuna, Roman goddess of chance.
Xi Wang-mu Tessera	30.0S	62.0E	1,300.0	1997	Chinese Queen Mother of the West, keeper of medicine for eternal life.
Yuki-Onne Tessera	39.0N	261.0E	1,200.0	1997	Yuki-onna, Japanese spirit of icy death.
Zirka Tessera	33.0N	300.0E	450.0	1997	Belarusian happiness goddess.

== Rupes ==
Scarps on Venus are called rupes and are named after goddesses of the hearth.

Name	Latitude	Longitude	Diameter (km)	Year named	Name origin
Fornax Rupes	30.3N	201.1E	729.0	1985	Fornax, Roman goddess of hearth and bread baking.
Gabie Rupes	67.5N	109.9E	350.0	1985	Gabija, Lithuanian goddess of fire and hearth.
Hestia Rupes	6.0N	71.1E	588.0	1982	Hestia, Greek hearth goddess.
Uorsar Rupes	76.8N	341.2E	820.0	1985	Adygan, Caucasian goddess of hearth.
Ut Rupes	55.3N	321.9E	676.0	1982	Siberian; Turco-Tatar goddess of the hearth fire.
Vaidilute Rupes	43.5S	22.0E	2,000.0	1997	Vaidilutė, Lithuanian priestesses and protectors of the sacred fire.
Vesta Rupes	58.3N	323.9E	788.0	1982	Vesta, Roman hearth goddess.

== Tholi ==
Tholi are areas of small domical hill or mountains on Venus, typically characterized by its steep flanks.

Name	Latitude	Longitude	Diameter (km)	Year named	Name origin
Akka Tholus	75.1 N	233.0 E	19.4	2009	Akka, Finnish mother goddess
Alcyone Tholus	2.1S	256.4E	70.0	2003	Greek goddess who is the personification of a rain cloud.
Ale Tholus	68.2N	247.0E	87.0	1985	Igbo (Nigeria) goddess who created Earth and vegetation.
Amra Tholus	53.0N	98.0E	50.0	1997	Abkhazian sun deity.
Angerona Tholus	29.8S	287.2E	200.0	1997	Italian goddess of silence.
Angrboda Tholus	73.8S	116.0E	80.0	1997	Norse Giantness, the first wife of Loki and mother of three evil deities.
Apakura Tholus	40.3N	208.8E	10.0	2006	Māori (New Zealand) goddess of justice.
Ashtart Tholus	48.7N	247.0E	138.0	1985	Phoenician goddess of love, fertility and war; personification of planet Venus.
Azimua Tholi	34.05S	249.35E	40.0	2006	Sumerian underworld goddess.
Bast Tholus	57.8N	130.3E	83.0	1985	Egyptian goddess of joy.
Brigit Tholus	49.0N	246.0E	0.0	1985	Celtic goddess of wisdom, doctoring, smithing.
Cotis Tholus	44.3N	233.0E	62.0	1997	Thracian goddess, mother of gods, similar to Cybele.Named changed from Cotis Mons.
Dröl-ma Tholus	24.2N	6.3E	40.0	2000	Tibetan goddess of compassion.
Eirene Tholus	75.5 N	230.0 E	58.0	2009	Eirene, Greek goddess of peace
Evaki Tholus	37.6N	342.2E	200.0	1997	Amazonian sleep goddess.
Ezili Tholus	23.7N	91.3E	150.0	2006-09-25	Benin (West Africa) goddess of "sweet water", beauty, and love.
Furki Tholus	35.9N	236.4E	79.0	1997	Chechen and Ingush (Caucasus) goddess, wife of thunder god Sela.Name changed from Furki Mons.
Gerd Tholi	54.5S	291.5E	50.0	1997	Scandinavian sky maiden.
Grechukha Tholi	8.6S	255.8E	200.0	2000	Ukrainian field deity.
Iaso Tholus	5.2N	255.3E	30.0	2003	Iaso, Greek goddess of health, medicine, and recovery.
Justitia Tholus	28.7S	296.5E	60.0	1997	Roman goddess of justice.
Khotal-Ekva Tholi	9.1S	177.8E	50.0	1997	Mansi (Ob River Ugra) sun goddess.
Kwannon Tholus	26.3S	296.8E	135.0	1997	Japanese Buddhist goddess of mercy.
Lama Tholus	7.8N	266.0E	110.0	2003	Sumerian protective goddess.
Mahuea Tholus	37.5S	164.7E	110.0	1994	Māori fire goddess.
Meiboia Tholus	44.7S	281.3E	85.0	1997	Meiboia, Greek bee goddess.
Mentha Tholus	43.0N	237.3E	79.0	1997	Roman goddess, personification of the human mind.Name changed from Mentha Mons.
Monoshi Tholus	37.7S	252.0E	15.0	2006	Bengal goddess of snakes.
Muru Tholus	9.0S	305.5E	40.0	1997	Estonian deity of meadows.
Narina Tholi	25.8S	80.0E	55.0	2000	Australian wild bird goddess.
Ndara Tholus	57.5S	16.0E	70.0	1997	Toraji (Sulavesi Isl., Indonesia) underworld and earthquake goddess.
Neegyauks Tholus	68.6S	200.0E	30.0	2000	Tlingit (SE Alaska) volcano woman and frog princess.
Nertus Tholus	61.2N	247.9E	66.0	1985	German/Norse vegetation goddess.
Nipa Tholus	8.4N	255.7E	140.0	2003	Algonquin moon goddess.
Norterma Tholus	77.0S	188.0E	15.0	2000	Tibetan wealth-giving goddess.
Otafuku Tholi	28.7N	46.3E	80.0	1997	Japanese goddess of joyfulness.
Otohime Tholus	32.0S	268.2E	20.0	2006	Japanese goddess of the arts and beauty.
Padma Tholi	34.7S	68.3E	100.0	2000	Hindu lotus goddess.
Pajan Yan Tholus	8.3N	252.2E	80.0	2003	Cambodian healing goddess whose face appears in markings on the Moon.
Paoro Tholi	10.5N	268.0E	225.0	2003	Māori (New Zealand) goddess of echoes; she gave voice to the first woman Marikoriko.
Perynya Tholus	0.7S	353.2E	110.0	2000	Slavic goddess, wife of thunderstorm god Perun.
Podaga Tholus	56.3S	2.0E	40.0	1997	Slavic weather goddess.
Rohina Tholus	40.6S	295.4E	30.0	1997	Hindu cow goddess.
Rosna Tholi	25.5S	73.3E	130.0	2000	Chimalateco/Chinanteco (Mexico) mountain goddess.
Semele Tholi	64.3N	202.9E	194.0	1985	Frygian (Phoenician) Earth goddess.
Shamiram Tholus	6.9S	335.2E	10.0	2000	Armenian goddess of love.
Sumerla Tholi	13.8S	252.2E	90.0	2000	E.Slavic underworld goddess.
Toci Tholus	29.5N	355.1E	300.0	1997	Aztec earthquake goddess.
Turi Tholus	66.9S	222.3E	15.0	2000	Polynesian goddess, created islands' relief.
Tursa Tholus	35.4S	205.2E	75.0	1997	Italian goddess of terror.
Upunusa Tholus	66.2N	252.4E	223.0	1985	Earth goddess of Leti and Babar (Southwestern islands, eastern Indonesia).
Vilakh Tholus	6.5S	176.5E	15.0	1997	Lakian/Kazikumukhan (Daghestan) fire goddess.
Vupar Tholus	13.5S	306.0E	100.0	1997	Chuvash (Volga area) evil spirit causing lunar and solar eclipses.
Wohpe Tholus	41.4N	288.1E	40.0	2006	Lakota goddess of order, beauty, and happiness.
Wurunsemu Tholus	40.6N	209.9E	83.0	1985	Hatti (proto-Hittite) sun goddess and mother of gods.
Yansa Tholus	76.1 N	232.2 E	20.0	2009	Brazilian goddess of wind and fire
Yurt-Ava Tholus	13.8S	341.5E	15.0	2000	Mordovian (Volga Finn) "home's mother" deity.
Zorya Tholus	9.4S	335.3E	22.0	1994	Slavic dawn goddess.

== Regiones ==
A regio refers to a distinct geographical area on the planet's surface with specific geological features.

Name	Latitude	Longitude	Diameter (km)	Year named	Name origin
Alpha Regio	25.5S	0.3E	1,897.0	1979	First letter in Greek alphabet.
Asteria Regio	21.6N	267.5E	1,131.0	1982	Greek Titaness.
Atla Regio	9.2N	200.1E	3,200.0	1982	Norse giantess, mother of Heimdall.
Bell Regio	32.8N	51.4E	1,778.0	1982	English giantess.
Beta Regio	25.3N	282.8E	2,869.0	1979	Second letter in Greek alphabet.
Dione Regio	31.5S	328.0E	2,300.0	1991	Greek Titanness; consort of Zeus and the mother of Aphrodite according to Homer.
Dsonkwa Regio	53.0S	167.0E	1,500.0	1997	Kwakiutl (NW Coast) forest giantess.
Eistla Regio	10.5N	21.5E	8,015.0	1982	Norse giantess.
Hyndla Regio	22.5N	294.5E	2,300.0	1991	Norse wood giantess.
Imdr Regio	43.0S	212.0E	1,611.0	1982	Norse giantess.
Ishkus Regio	61.0S	245.0E	1,000.0	1997	Makah (NW Coast) forest giantess.
Laufey Regio	7.0N	315.0E	2,100.0	2000	Norse giantess.
Neringa Regio	65.0S	288.0E	1,100.0	1997	Lithuanian seacoast giantess.
Ovda Regio	2.8S	85.6E	5,280.0	1982	Hebrew, meaning "fact".
Phoebe Regio	6.0S	282.8E	2,852.0	1982	Greek Titaness.
Tethus Regio	66.0N	120.0E	0.0	1982	Greek Titaness.
Themis Regio	37.4S	284.2E	1,811.0	1982	Greek Titaness.
Thetis Regio	11.4S	129.9E	2,801.0	1982	Greek Titaness.
Ulfrun Regio	27.0N	225.0E	3,954.0	1982	Norse giantess.
Vasilisa Regio	11.0S	332.0E	1,200.0	1997	Russian tale heroine.

== Plana ==
Plana are regions of flat topography.

Name	Latitude	Longitude	Diameter (km)	Year named	Name origin
Astkhik Planum	45.0S	20.0E	2,000.0	1997	Astghik – Armenian goddess of love, beauty and water.
Lakshmi Planum	68.6N	339.3E	2,345.0	1979	Lakshmi, Indian goddess of love and war.
Turan Planum	13.0S	116.5E	800.0	2003	Turan, Etruscan goddess of love, health, and fertility.
Viriplaca Planum	20.0S	112.0E	1,200.0	2003	Viriplaca, Roman goddess of matrimonial love and happiness.

== Planitiae ==
Name	Latitude	Longitude	Diameter (km)	Year named	Name origin
Aibarchin Planitia	73.0S	25.0E	1,200.0	1997	Uzbek "Alpamysh" epic tale heroine.
Aino Planitia	40.5S	94.5E	4,985.0	1982	Finnish heroine who became water spirit.
Akhtamar Planitia	27.0N	65.0E	2,700.0	1997	Armenian epic heroine.
Alma-Merghen Planitia	76.0S	100.0E	1,500.0	1997	Mongol/Tibet/Buryat "Gheser" epic tale heroine.
Atalanta Planitia	45.6N	165.8E	2,050.0	1982	Greek mythical heroine.
Audra Planitia	59.8N	92.3E	1,860.0	1991	Lithuanian sea mistress.
Bereghinya Planitia	28.6N	23.6E	3,900.0	1985	Slavic water spirit.
Dzerassa Planitia	15.0S	295.0E	2,800.0	1997	Ossetian epic heroine Dzerassae; golden-haired daughter of water king.
Fonueha Planitia	44.0S	48.0E	3,000.0	1997	Samoan folktale blind old woman who became the shark.
Ganiki Planitia	40.0N	202.0E	5,160.0	1985	Orochian (Siberia) water spirit, mermaid.
Guinevere Planitia	21.9N	325.0E	7,520.0	1982	British, wife of Arthur.
Gunda Planitia	16.0S	267.0E	1,200.0	1997	Abkhazian epic heroine, beautiful sister of the giant knights.
Helen Planitia	51.7S	263.9E	4,360.0	1982	Helen of Troy; Greek; "the face that launched 1000 ships."
Hinemoa Planitia	5.0N	265.0E	3,700.0	1997	Māori tale heroine; swam across Rotorua Lake to her friend.
Imapinua Planitia	60.0S	142.0E	2,100.0	1997	E.Greenland Eskimo sea mistress.
Kanykey Planitia	10.0S	350.0E	2,100.0	1997	Kyrgyz "Manas" epic tale heroine, wife of the knight Manas.
Kawelu Planitia	32.8N	246.5E	3,910.0	1985	Hawaiian mythological heroine, died and brought back to life.
Laimdota Planitia	58.0S	117.0E	1,800.0	1997	Laimdota, Latvian mythological heroine.
Lavinia Planitia	47.3S	347.5E	2,820.0	1982	Roman; wife of Aeneas.
Leda Planitia	44.0N	65.1E	2,890.0	1982	Mother of Helen, Castor.
Libuše Planitia	60.0N	290.0E	1,200.0	1997	Czech tales heroine, wiser of three sisters.
Llorona Planitia	18.0N	145.0E	2,600.0	1997	Mexican/Spanish folktale heroine.
Louhi Planitia	80.5N	120.5E	2,440.0	1985	Karelo-Finn mother of the North.
Lowana Planitia	43.0N	98.0E	2,700.0	1997	Australian aboriginal tale heroine; lived alone by the sea weaving baskets.
Mugazo Planitia	69.0S	60.0E	1,500.0	1997	Vietnamese tale heroine.
Navka Planitia	8.1S	317.6E	2,100.0	1982	East-Slavic mermaid.
Niobe Planitia	21.0N	112.3E	5,008.0	1982	Niobe; Greek; her 12 children killed by Artemis and Apollo.
Nsomeka Planitia	53.0S	195.0E	2,100.0	1994	Bantu culture heroine.
Nuptadi Planitia	73.0S	250.0E	1,200.0	1997	Mandan (US Plains) folk heroine; had magic shell robe.
Rusalka Planitia	9.8N	170.1E	3,655.0	1982	Russian mermaid.
Sedna Planitia	42.7N	340.7E	3,570.0	1982	Sedna; Inuit; her fingers became seals and whales.
Snegurochka Planitia	86.6N	328.0E	2,775.0	1985	Snow maiden in Russian folktales, melted in spring.
Sogolon Planitia	8.0N	107.0E	1,600.0	1997	Mandingo (Mali) epic heroine, buffalo-woman, mother of giant.
Tahmina Planitia	23.0S	80.0E	3,000.0	1997	Iranian epic heroine, wife of knight Rustam.
Tilli-Hanum Planitia	54.0N	120.0E	2,300.0	1997	Azeri "Ker-ogly" epic tale heroine.
Tinatin Planitia	15.0S	15.0E	0.0	1994	Georgian epic heroine.
Undine Planitia	13.0N	303.0E	2,800.0	1997	Undinė, Lithuanian water nymph, mermaid.
Vellamo Planitia	45.4N	149.1E	2,155.0	1985	Karelo-Finn mermaid.
Vinmara Planitia	53.8N	207.6E	1,635.0	1985	Swan maiden whom sea god Qat kept on Earth by hiding her wings (New Hebrides).
Wawalag Planitia	30.0S	217.0E	2,600.0	1997	Two sisters named the Wawalag, in Yolngu mythology (Arnhem Land, Australia).
Zhibek Planitia	40.0S	157.0E	2,000.0	1997	Kazakh "Kyz-Zhibek" epic tale heroine.

== Paterae ==
A Patera is an irregular crater or a complex crater with scalloped edges.

Name	Latitude	Longitude	Diameter (km)	Year named	Name origin
Aitchison Patera	16.7S	349.4E	28.0	1994	Alison Aitchison, American geographer (1874–1964).
Anning Paterae	66.5N	57.8E	0.0	1991	Mary Anning, English paleontologist (1799–1847).
Anthony Patera	48.2N	32.6E	70.0	1991	Susan B. Anthony, American suffrage leader (1820–1906).
Apgar Patera	43.1N	83.8E	126.0	1991	Virginia Apgar, American doctor (1909–1974).
Ayrton Patera	6.0N	227.3E	85.0	1994	Hertha Ayrton, English physicist (1854–1923).
Bakhtadze Patera	45.5N	219.5E	50.0	1997	Kseniya Bakhtadze, Georgian geneticist (1899–1978).
Barnes Patera	15.5S	229.2E	15.0	2003	Florence "Pancho" Barnes, American aviator (1901–1975).
Bers Patera	66.7S	183.0E	17.0	2000	Sofya Andreyevna Tolstaya, wife and copyist for Leo Tolstoy (1844–1919).
Bethune Patera	46.5N	321.3E	94.0	1991	Mary McLeod Bethune, American educator and activist (1875–1955).
Boadicea Paterae	56.6N	96.5E	220.0	1991	Boudica, queen and heroine of the Iceni tribe (d. 60–61)
Bremer Patera	66.8N	63.7E	91.0	1991	Fredrika Bremer, Swedish writer, reformer, and feminist (1801–1865).
Cherskaya Patera	5.2S	232.5E	85.0	2003	Marva Pavlovna Cherskaya, Russian explorer of East Siberia, wife of Ivan Chersky (c. 1850 – c. 1900).
Colette Patera	66.3N	322.8E	149.0	1982	Sidonie-Gabrielle Colette, French novelist (1873–1954).
Darclée Patera	37.4S	263.8E	15.0	2006	Hariclea Darclée, Romanian soprano singer (1860–1939).
Davies Patera	47.2N	269.3E	93.0	1991	Emily Davies, British educator, feminist, and college founder (1830–1921).
Destinnová Patera	31.5S	250.2E	15.0	2006	Ema (pseudonym of Emilia Kittlova), Czech singer, also known as Emmy Destinn (1878–1930).
Dietrich Patera	5.3S	235.3E	100.0	2003	Marlene Dietrich, German-born American actress (1901–1992).
Dutrieu Patera	33.8N	198.5E	80.0	2006	Hélène Dutrieu, Belgian/French pioneer aviator (1877–1961).
Eliot Patera	39.1N	79.0E	116.0	1991	George Eliot (Mary Ann Evans), English writer (1819–1880).
Fedchenko Patera	24.0S	226.5E	75.0	1997	Olga Fedchenko, Russian botanist, explorer of Central Asia (1845–1921).
Fedosova Patera	45.0N	171.8E	24.0	1997	Irina Fedosova, Russian folk poet (1831–1899). Changed from Fedosova crater.
Garbo Patera	1.5N	258.2E	75.0	2003	Greta Garbo, Swedish-born American actress (1905–1990).
Garland Patera	32.7N	206.8E	45.0	2006	Judy Garland, American singer and actress (1922–1969).
Graham Patera	6.0S	6.0E	75.0	1997	Martha Graham, American dancer and choreographer (1894–1991). Name changed from Graham crater.
Grizodubova Patera	16.7N	299.6E	50.0	1997	Valentina Grizodubova, Soviet aviator (1909–1993).
Hatshepsut Patera	28.1N	64.5E	118.0	1985	Hatshepsut, Egyptian pharaoh (1507-1458 BC).
Hiei Chu Patera	48.2N	97.4E	139.0	1985	Chinese, converted silk worm product into thread and material (2698 B.C.).
Hroswitha Patera	35.8N	34.8E	163.0	1985	Hrotsvitha of Gandersheim, German writer (c. 935–975).
Izumi Patera	50.0N	193.6E	74.0	1985	Izumi Shikibu, Japanese writer (974–1036).
Jaszai Patera	32.0N	305.0E	70.0	1997	Mari Jászai, Hungarian actress (1850–1926).
Jotuni Patera	6.5S	214.0E	100.0	1997	Maria Jotuni, Finnish writer (1880–1943).
Keller Patera	45.0N	274.0E	69.0	1991	Helen Keller, American writer and activist (1880–1968).
Kottauer Patera	36.7N	39.6E	136.0	1985	Helena Kottauer, Austrian historical writer (1410–1471).
Kupo Patera	41.9S	195.5E	100.0	1997	Irena Kupo, Israelite astronomer (1929–1978).
Kvasha Patera	9.5S	69.0E	50.0	1997	Lidiya Kvasha, Soviet mineralogist, meteorite researcher (1909–1977).
Ledoux Patera	9.2S	224.8E	75.0	1994	Jeanne-Philiberte Ledoux, French painter(1767–1840).
Libby Patera	34.5S	199.5E	90.0	1997	Leona Woods, American chemist and physicist (1919–1986).
Lindgren Patera	28.1N	241.4E	110.0	2006	Astrid Lindgren, Swedish author (1907–2002).
Malibran Patera	18.4S	224.6E	60.0	2003	Maria Malibran, Spanish/French singer (1808–1836), sister of Pauline Viardot-Garcia (see Viardot Patera).
Malintzin Patera	57.0N	81.5E	60.0	1991	La Malinche, Nahua guide and interpreter (1501–1530).
Mansfield Patera	29.5N	227.5E	80.0	1997	Katherine Mansfield, New Zealand writer (1888–1923).
Mehseti Patera	16.0N	311.0E	60.0	1997	Mahsati, Persian poet (c.1050-c.1100).
Mezrina Patera	33.3S	68.8E	60.0	2000	Anna Mezrina, Russian clay toy sculptor (1853–1938).
Mikhaylova Patera	26.8S	348.2E	70.0	1997	Dariya (better known as Dasha of Sevastopol); Russian nurse (c.1830-c.1915).
Nikolaeva Patera	33.9N	267.5E	100.0	2006	Olga Nikolaeva, Russian planetologist/geochemist (1941–2000).
Nordenflycht Patera	35.0S	266.0E	140.0	1997	Hedvig Charlotta Nordenflycht, Swedish poet (1718–1763).
Panina Patera	13.0S	309.8E	50.0	1997	Varvara Panina, Romani/Russian singer (1872–1911).
Payne-Gaposchkin Patera	25.5S	196.0E	100.0	1997	Cecilia Payne-Gaposchkin, American astronomer (1900–1979).
Pchilka Patera	26.5N	234.0E	100.0	1997	Olena Pchilka (Olga Kosach), Ukrainian writer and ethnographer (1849–1930).
Pocahontas Patera	64.9N	49.4E	78.0	1991	Pocahontas, Powhatan Indian peacemaker (1595–1617).
Raskova Paterae	51.0S	222.8E	80.0	1994	Marina Raskova, Russian aviator (1912–1943).
Razia Patera	46.2N	197.8E	157.0	1985	Razia Sultana, Queen of Delhi Sultanate (1236–1240).
Rogneda Patera	2.8S	220.5E	120.0	2003	Rogneda of Polotsk, Slavic princess, wife of Vladimir the Great, duke of Kiev, mother of Yaroslav the Wise (c. 950–1000).
Sacajawea Patera	64.3N	335.4E	233.0	1982	Sacagawea, Shoshone guide and explorer (1786–1812).
Sachs Patera	49.1N	334.2E	65.0	1991	Nelly Sachs, German-born Swedish playwright and poet (1891–1970).
Sappho Patera	14.1N	16.5E	225.0	1979	Sappho, Greek lyric poet (c. 630–570)
Serova Patera	20.0N	247.0E	60.0	1997	Valentina Serova, Soviet actress (1918–1975).
Shelikhova Patera	75.7S	162.5E	60.0	1997	Natalia Shelikhova, Russian explorer of Alaska (1762–1810).
Shulzhenko Patera	6.5N	264.5E	60.0	1997	Klavdiya Shulzhenko, Soviet singer (1906–1984).
Siddons Patera	61.6N	340.6E	47.0	1997	Sarah Siddons, English actress (1755–1831).
Stopes Patera	42.6N	46.5E	169.0	1991	Marie Stopes, English paleontologist (1880–1959).
Tarbell Patera	58.2S	351.5E	80.0	1994	Ida Tarbell, American journalist and editor (1857–1944).
Teasdale Patera	67.6S	189.1E	75.0	1994	Sara Teasdale, American poet (1884–1933).
Tenisheva Patera	1.4S	254.8E	80.0	2000	Princess Maria Tenisheva, Russian painter and art collector (1867–1928).
Tey Patera	17.8S	349.1E	20.0	1994	Josephine Tey, Scottish author (1897–1952).
Tipporah Patera	38.9N	43.0E	99.0	1985	Hebrew medical scholar (1500 BC).
Viardot Patera	7.0S	254.3E	55.0	2000	Pauline Viardot, French singer and composer (1821–1910).
Vibert-Douglas Patera	11.6S	194.3E	45.0	2003	(Allie) Vibert Douglas, Canadian astronomer (1894–1988).
Villepreux-Power Patera	22.0S	210.0E	100.0	1997	Jeanne Villepreux-Power, French marine biologist (1794–1871).
Vovchok Patera	38.0S	310.0E	80.0	1997	Marko Vovchok, Ukrainian writer (1833–1907).
Wilde Patera	21.3S	266.3E	75.0	2000	Jane Wilde, Irish poet (1821–1891).
Witte Patera	25.8S	247.65E	35.0	2006	Wilhelmine Witte, German astronomer (1777–1854).
Žemaite Patera	35.0S	263.0E	60.0	1997	Žemaitė, Lithuanian writer (1845–1921).

== Lineae ==
Name	Latitude	Longitude	Diameter (km)	Year named	Name origin
Agrona Linea	40.0N	280.0E	2,300.0	2006	Agrona, Welsh goddess of slaughter, destroyer of life.
Antiope Linea	40.0S	350.0E	0.0	1982	Antiope, Amazon awarded to Theseus.
Badb Linea	14.0N	15.0E	1,750.0	1997	Badb, Irish war goddess.
Breksta Linea	35.9N	304.0E	700.0	1985	Breksta, Lithuanian night darkness goddess. Name changed from Breksta Dorsa August 2004
Discordia Linea	58.0S	246.5E	800.0	1997	Discordia, Roman goddess of strife.
Guor Linea	20.0N	0.0E	0.0	1982	Gudr, Norse Valkyrie.
Hippolyta Linea	42.0S	345.0E	0.0	1982	Hippolyta, Amazon queen.
Jokwa Linea	17.0S	210.0E	2,200.0	2003	Jokwa, the Japanese "Royal Lady of the West" who waged war with demons and giants, then set the world in order.
Kalaipahoa Linea	60.5S	336.5E	2,400.0	1991	Hawaiian war goddess.
Kara Linea	44.0S	306.0E	0.0	1982	Kára, Norse Valkyrie.
Lampedo Linea	62.2N	293.0E	800.0	1982	Lampedo, Scythian Amazon queen.
Molpadia Linea	48.0S	355.0E	0.0	1982	Molpadia, Amazon warrior
Morrigan Linea	54.5S	311.0E	3,200.0	1991	The Morrígan, Celtic war goddess.
Penardun Linea	54.0S	344.0E	975.0	1991	Celtic sky goddess.
Sarykyz Linea	77.3S	200.0E	370.0	1997	Uzbek evil spirit.
Sui-ur Linea	61.0S	260.0E	700.0	1997	Mansi (Ob River Ugra) wife of war god.
Thaukhud Linea	24.0S	232.0E	900.0	2003	Adygan (North Caucasus) brave female warrior, a good spirit.
Veleda Linea	10.0S	213.0E	1,350.0	2003	Warrior goddess of the continental Celts.
Virtus Linea	12.0N	21.0E	500.0	1997	Virtus, Roman war goddess.

== Labyrinthi ==
Name	Latitude	Longitude	Diameter (km)	Year named	Name origin
Radunitsa Labyrinthus	8.9S	351.3E	100.0	2000	Radunitsa, Ancient Slavic goddess, keeper of souls of the deceased.

== Fossae ==
Name	Latitude	Longitude	Diameter (km)	Year named	Name origin
Aife Fossae	67.0N	131.0E	280.0	1997	Irish warrior deity.
Ajina Fossae	45.0S	258.0E	300.0	1997	Tajik evil spirit.
Albasty Fossae	9.0S	336.5E	500.0	1997	Tartar evil spirit.
Arianrod Fossae	37.0N	239.9E	715.0	1985	Welsh warrior queen.
Bellona Fossae	38.0N	222.1E	855.0	1985	Roman war goddess, wife of Mars.
Brynhild Fossae	26.0S	18.0E	1,800.0	1997	Norse warrior maiden.
Enyo Fossae	62.0S	351.0E	700.0	1991	Greek war goddess.
Fea Fossae	27.5N	224.0E	620.0	1997	Gaelic war goddess.
Felesta Fossae	34.5N	46.5E	570.0	1991	Amazon queen in Scythian epic tales.
Friagabi Fossae	50.2N	109.5E	141.0	1985	Old English goddess, connected with Mars.
Gulaim Fossae	5.0S	329.0E	800.0	1997	Karakalpak amazon leader.
Hanekasa Fossae	29.0N	148.5E	700.0	1997	Sanema (Venezuela) amazon warrior.
Hildr Fossa	45.4N	159.4E	677.0	1985	Norse mythological warrior.
Ilbis Fossae	71.9N	254.6E	512.0	1985	Yakutian (Siberia) goddess of bloodshed.
Karra-māhte Fossae	28.0N	342.0E	1,800.0	1997	Kara māte, Latvian war goddess.
Khosedem Fossae	13.0S	303.0E	1,800.0	1997	Ketian (Yenisey R.) main evil goddess.
Magura Fossae	12.0S	332.5E	600.0	1997	E.Slavic winged warrior maiden.
Manto Fossae	63.6N	64.9E	536.0	1991	Greek war goddess.
Minerva Fossae	64.5N	252.5E	0.0	1985	Roman goddess of war.
Mist Fossae	39.5N	247.3E	244.0	1985	Norse Valkyrie.Changed to Mist Chasma.
Naguchitsa Fossae	35.6S	159.3E	730.0	2003	Adygan evil warrior, old woman with iron teeth.
Naijok Fossae	70.2S	337.0E	450.0	1997	Dinka (Sudan) evil deity.
Namjyalma Fossae	2.5N	2.7E	560.0	2000	Tibetan victorious mother.
Narundi Fossae	66.5S	329.0E	700.0	1997	Elam goddess of victory.
Nike Fossae	59.5S	340.0E	800.0	1991	Greek goddess of victory.
Penthesilea Fossa	12.0S	214.0E	1,700.0	1997	Greek amazon queen.
Perunitsa Fossae	10.0S	307.0E	1,300.0	1997	E.Slavic winged warrior maiden.
Rangrid Fossae	62.7N	356.4E	243.0	1985	Norse Valkyrie.
Saykal Fossae	73.0N	139.0E	300.0	1997	Kyrgyz warrior maiden.
Sigrun Fossae	50.5N	18.0E	970.0	1985	Norse Valkyrie.
Valkyrie Fossae	58.2N	7.0E	357.0	1991	Norse battle maidens.
Yenkhoboy Fossae	48.0S	7.0E	900.0	1997	Buryatian warrior sisters.
Yuzut-Arkh Fossae	48.0N	224.0E	550.0	1997	Khakas (S.Siberia) evil deity.
Zheztyrnak Fossae	67.5S	182.0E	180.0	2000	Kazakh evil deity, "copper claw" maiden.

== Fluctūs ==
Name	Latitude	Longitude	Diameter (km)	Year named	Name origin
Alpan Fluctus	7.5S	349.0E	500.0	1997	Lezghin (Daghestan) fire goddess.
Argimpasa Fluctus	0.0N	175.5E	950.0	1997	Argimpasa, Scythian goddess of love.
Arubani Fluctus	55.0S	132.0E	620.0	1997	Urartu supreme goddess.
Bolotnitsa Fluctus	50.0N	160.0E	1,100.0	1997	E.Slavic swamp mermaid.
Cavillaca Fluctus	72.0S	340.0E	800.0	1997	Huarochiri (Peru) virgin goddess, turned herself into a rock.
Darago Fluctus	11.5S	313.5E	775.0	1994	Darago, Philippine volcano goddess.
Djabran Fluctus	43.5S	183.0E	300.0	1997	Djabran, Abkhazian goddess of goats.
Djata Fluctus	66.5N	307.5E	280.0	1997	Ngadju (Kalimantan Isl., Indonesia) water goddess.
Dotetem Fluctus	6.0S	177.5E	530.0	1997	Ketian (Yenisey R.) evil spirit.
Eriu Fluctus	37.0S	357.0E	600.0	1991	Irish earth mother.
Heloha Fluctus	77.0 N	344.0 E	375.0	2009	Heloha, Chocktaw thunderbird
Henwen Fluctus	20.5S	179.9E	485.0	1994	Henwen, British Celtic sow-goddess.
Hikuleo Fluctus	52.5N	208.0E	600.0	1997	Hikuleo, Tonga (Polynesia) underworld goddess.
Ilaheva Fluctus	42.5S	84.0E	900.0	2000	Tonga (Polynesia) worm goddess.
Itoki Fluctus	6.0S	229.0E	900.0	2003	Itoki, Nicaraguan goddess of insects, stars, and planets.
Juturna Fluctus	76.0S	350.0E	900.0	1997	Roman nymph of the brook in Lavinia, wife of Janus, mother of Fons.
Kaapaau Fluctus	66.5S	181.0E	350.0	2000	Kaapaau, Polynesian goddess of sharks.
Kaiwan Fluctus	45.5S	358.0E	1,200.0	1991	Ethiopian earth mother.
Kasogonaga Fluctus	18.0S	268.0E	850.0	2000	Kasogonagá, Chaco tribes/Guaraní (Argentina) female rain spirit.
Koti Fluctus	12.5N	318.0E	400.0	1997	Koti, Creek (SE USA) water-frog, helpful spirit.
Kunkubey Fluctus	50.0S	207.0E	350.0	2000	Kunkubey, Yakutian/Sakha goddess, wife of supreme god Yuryung.
Mamapacha Fluctus	60.0N	185.0E	900.0	1997	Inca earthquake goddess.
Medb Fluctus	56.0S	127.0E	350.0	1997	Irish mother of gods, wife of Ailil.
Merisa Fluctus	20.5N	9.0E	630.0	2000	Adygan (N.Caucasus) beekeeping goddess.
Mert Fluctus	50.5S	230.5E	250.0	2000	Mert, Egyptian goddess of music and singing.
Mortim-Ekva Fluctus	1.0N	334.0E	1,250.0	2000	Mansi (Ob River Ugra) mistress of "Bird's country".
Mylitta Fluctus	54.0S	355.5E	1,250.0	1991	Semitic mother goddess.
Nambubi Fluctus	61.0S	135.0E	850.0	1997	Ganda goddess, mother of god Mukasa.
Naunet Fluctus	81.0S	136.0E	200.0	2000	Naunet, Ancient Egyptian (Heliopolis) sky goddess.
Neago Fluctūs	49.3N	351.0E	0.0	1991	Neago, Seneca (USA) goddess of silence.
Nekhebet Fluctus	0.0N	35.0E	400.0	1997	Egyptian vulture goddess.
Ney-Anki Fluctus	37.0S	105.0E	950.0	2000	Khanty (Ob River Ugra) mother of fire.
Ningyo Fluctus	5.5S	206.0E	970.0	1994	Japanese fish goddess.
Oilule Fluctus	22.0S	79.0E	900.0	2000	Oilule, West Bulgarian wife of thunder god.
Ovda Fluctus	6.1S	95.5E	310.0	1994	Named from regio where feature is located.
Praurime Fluctus	16.0N	154.0E	750.0	1997	Praurime, Lithuanian fire goddess.
Rafara Fluctus	65.0S	159.0E	700.0	1997	Rafara, Malagasy (Madagascar) water goddess.
Sicasica Fluctus	52.0S	180.4E	175.0	1994	Sicasica, Aymara (Bolivia) mountain goddess.
Sobra Fluctus	6.0N	248.0E	700.0	1997	Marindanim (New Guinea and Melanesia) creator goddess.
Sonmunde Fluctus	60.0S	120.0E	400.0	1997	Korean mountain goddess.
Strenia Fluctus	41.0N	250.0E	490.0	1997	Roman goddess of New Year festivities.
Syvne Fluctus	36.0S	72.0E	900.0	2000	Nenets (Samoyed) winter maiden.
Tie Fluctus	21.0N	159.0E	550.0	2003	Tie (goddess), Egyptian goddess of intelligence and wisdom.
Tsunghi Fluctus	67.0S	130.0E	800.0	1997	Hibaro (Ecuador) water goddess.
Turgmam Fluctus	56.0N	220.0E	500.0	1997	Turgmam, Nivkhi (Sakhalin Isl.) fire mistress.
Ubastet Fluctus	48.0S	27.0E	550.0	1997	Egyptian cat goddess.
Uilata Fluctus	17.0N	314.0E	700.0	1997	Cherokee stone-clad female monster.
Uzume Fluctus	28.6N	220.3E	700.0	1997	Japanese goddess of cheerfulness.
Vut-Ami Fluctus	38.0S	67.0E	1,300.0	2000	Chuvash (Volga Region) fire goddess.
Yagami Fluctus	80.6S	152.0E	260.0	2000	Japanese goddess, bride of god O-kuninusi.
Zipaltonal Fluctus	37.7N	251.3E	290.0	1997	Zipaltonal Nicaraguan creator goddess.

== Farra ==
Name	Latitude	Longitude	Diameter (km)	Year named	Name origin
Aegina Farrum	35.5N	20.9E	60.0	1994	Greek river nymph.
Anqet Farra	33.6N	311.5E	125.0	1994	Egyptian goddess of fertile waters.
Anqet Farrum	33.6N	311.5E	125.0	1994	Egyptian goddess of fertile waters.Changed to Anqet Farra.
Carmenta Farra	12.4N	8.0E	180.0	1994	Roman goddess of springs.
Egeria Farrum	43.6N	7.5E	40.0	1994	Roman water nymph.
Flosshilde Farra	10.5N	279.4E	75.0	1994	German water nymph.
Liban Farra	23.9S	353.5E	100.0	1994	Irish water goddess.
Nammu Farra	2.3N	169.4E	160.0	2003	Assyro-Babylonian goddess of the waters of creation.
Oshun Farra	4.2N	19.3E	80.0	1994	Yoruba (Nigeria) fresh water goddess.
Seoritsu Farra	30.0S	11.0E	230.0	1994	Japanese stream goddess.

== Dorsa ==
Name	Latitude	Longitude	Diameter (km)	Year named	Name origin
Abe Mango Dorsa	47.0N	212.0E	800.0	1997	Abe Mango, Tukano (Brazil) daughter of sun god.
Achek Dorsa	37.2S	230.0E	1,000.0	1997	Achek, Dinka (Sudan) wife of rain god Deng.
Aditi Dorsa	30.0S	189.0E	1,200.0	1997	Indian sky goddess.
Ahsonnutli Dorsa	47.9N	196.5E	1,708.0	1985	Ahsonnutli, Navajo (N.America) spirit of light and sky.
Aida-Wedo Dorsa	73.0N	214.0E	450.0	1997	Aida-Wedo, Haitian rainbow spirit.
Akewa Dorsa	45.5N	184.0E	900.0	1997	Akewa, Toba (Argentina) sun goddess.
Akuanda Dorsa	63.5N	232.0E	800.0	1997	Akuanda, Adygan light deity.
Alkonost Dorsa	5.0S	341.0E	730.0	1997	Alkonost, E.Slavic wonder bird with woman's face, lives in Paradise.
Allat Dorsa	60.0N	70.0E	750.0	1985	Allat, Arab sky goddess.
Amitolane Dorsa	77.0S	335.0E	900.0	1997	Amitolane, Zuni (SW USA) name of the rainbow.
Anpao Dorsa	62.0N	207.0E	550.0	1997	Anpao, Dakota name of the dawn.
Arev Dorsa	52.0S	216.0E	420.0	2000	Armenian female solar deity.
Asiaq Dorsa	53.0S	55.0E	400.0	1997	Asiaq, Inuit weather goddess.
Auska Dorsum	59.9N	357.8E	361.0	1985	Lithuanian goddess of sun rays.
Aušrā Dorsa	49.4N	25.3E	859.0	1985	Lithuanian dawn goddess.
Barbale Dorsa	15.0N	143.0E	1,200.0	1997	Georgian sun goddess.
Ben Dorsa	71.2N	284.1E	628.0	1985	Ben, Vietnamese sky goddess.
Bezlea Dorsa	30.4N	36.5E	807.0	1985	Lithuanian evening light goddess.
Biliku Dorsa	47.0S	138.0E	600.0	1997	Biliku, Andaman Islands monsoon deity.
Boszorkany Dorsa	19.5S	105.0E	550.0	2003	Boszorkany, Hungarian witch, flies over the sky.
Breksta Dorsa	35.9N	304.0E	700.0	1985	Lithuanian night darkness goddess.(Name changed to Breksta Linea August 2004.)
Charykh-Keyok Dorsa	54.5N	285.0E	550.0	1997	Charykh-Keyok, Khakasian (S.Siberia) magic bird.
Chih Nu Dorsum	73.0S	195.0E	625.0	1994	Chih Nu, Chinese sky goddess.
Dennitsa Dorsa	85.6N	205.9E	872.0	1985	Dennitsa, Slavic goddess of day, light.
Dodola Dorsa	46.8N	272.6E	607.0	1985	South Slavic rain goddess.
Dudumitsa Dorsa	13.5S	358.0E	980.0	2000	Dudumitsa, Bulgarian rain deity.
Dyan-Mu Dorsa	78.2N	31.9E	687.0	1985	Chinese lightning goddess.
Dylacha Dorsa	19.0S	76.0E	650.0	1997	Dylacha, Evenk/Tungu (Siberia) sun goddess.
Etain Dorsa	45.0S	199.0E	1,400.0	1997	Etain, Irish sun and horse goddess.
Frigg Dorsa	51.2N	150.6E	896.0	1985	Frigg, Norse, wife of supreme god Odin.
Fulgora Dorsa	78.5 N	342.0 E	463.0	2009	Fulgora, Roman lightning god
Hemera Dorsa	51.0N	243.4E	587.0	1985	Hemera, Greek goddess, personification of day.
Hera Dorsa	36.4N	29.5E	813.0	1985	Hera, Greek sky goddess, wife of Zeus.
Iris Dorsa	52.7N	221.3E	2,050.0	1985	Iris, Greek goddess of the rainbow.
Iyele Dorsa	50.0N	278.7E	595.0	1985	Iyele, Moldavian witch who directed the winds.
Juno Dorsum	31.0S	95.6E	1,652.0	1982	Juno, Roman sky goddess; sister and consort of Jupiter.
Kadlu Dorsa	69.5S	188.0E	500.0	1997	Kadlu, Inuit thunder deity.
Kalm Dorsa	18.0N	309.0E	300.0	1997	Kalm (Mansi mythology), Mansi (Ob River Ugra) winged messenger from gods to humans.
Kamari Dorsa	59.2N	55.8E	589.0	1985	Georgian sky maiden, daughter of weather god.
Kastiatsi Dorsa	53.0S	245.0E	1,200.0	1997	Kastiatsi, Acoma (SW USA) name of the rainbow.
Khadne Dorsa	14.0S	334.5E	220.0	1997	Khadne, Nenets (Samoyed) snowstorm maiden.
Kotsmanyako Dorsa	76.0S	242.0E	1,900.0	1997	Kotsmanyako, Keresan Pueblo mythological girl who scattered the stars into the sky.
Kuldurok Dorsa	50.4S	61.0E	1,100.0	1997	Kuldurok, Uzbek thunder and lightning goddess.
Laūma Dorsa	64.8N	190.4E	1,517.0	1985	Lauma, Lithuanian and Latvian earth and air goddess.
Laverna Dorsa	50.0S	132.0E	1,100.0	1997	Roman darkness and income goddess.
Lemkechen Dorsa	18.5N	68.5E	2,000.0	1997	Lemkechen, Berber pole star goddess, holds camel motionless to milk it.
Lukelong Dorsa	73.3N	178.8E	1,566.0	1985	Lukelong, Polynesian goddess, creator of heavens.
Lumo Dorsa	24.5N	149.0E	500.0	1997	Tibetan goddess of sky, rain, and mist.
Mardezh-Ava Dorsa	32.4N	68.6E	906.0	1985	Marian (Volga Finn) wind goddess.
Menkerot Dorsa	20.0S	351.5E	770.0	2000	Ancient Egyptian goddess, mother of the sun.
Metelitsa Dorsa	16.0N	31.0E	1,300.0	1997	Metelitsa, E.Slavic snowstorm deity.
Naatse-elit Dorsa	66.0S	249.0E	950.0	1997	Naatse-elit.Navajo rainbow goddess.
Nambi Dorsum	72.5S	213.0E	1,125.0	1994	Nambi, Ugandan sky goddess.
Naran Dorsa	54.0S	238.0E	600.0	1997	Naran, Mongolian sun goddess.
Natami Dorsa	71.5S	258.0E	800.0	1997	Natami (fairy), Mon (Burma/Myanmar) beauty fairy.
Nephele Dorsa	39.7N	138.8E	1,937.0	1985	Nephele, Greek cloud goddess.
Nichka Dorsa	10.0S	354.0E	550.0	2000	Nichka, Ukrainian night deity.
Norwan Dorsa	65.0N	163.0E	450.0	1997	Norwan, Wintun (California) light goddess.
Nuvakchin Dorsa	53.0S	212.0E	2,200.0	1997	Nuvakchin, Hopi snow maiden ('kachina').
Odzerchen Dorsa	72.0S	152.0E	300.0	2000	Odzerchen, Tibetan goddess of boundless light.
Ojuz Dorsa	6.0N	37.0E	400.0	1997	Tajik deity of frost and cold wind.
Okipeta Dorsa	67.5N	240.0E	1,200.0	1985	Okipeta, Greek goddess of whirlwind.
Oshumare Dorsa	58.5S	79.0E	550.0	1997	Yoruba rainbow deity.
Oya Dorsa	21.5N	157.5E	480.0	2003	Yoruba (Nigeria) goddess of violent rainstorms.
Pandrosos Dorsa	58.2N	207.7E	1,254.0	1985	Greek dew goddess.
Poludnitsa Dorsa	5.0N	179.5E	1,500.0	1997	Poludnitsa, E.Slavic witch, corn fields deity.
Pulugu Dorsa	65.0S	225.0E	650.0	1997	Andaman Islands monsoon wind deity.
Ragana Dorsa	69.0S	246.0E	950.0	1997	Ragana, Lithuanian and Latvian witch.
Rokapi Dorsa	55.0S	222.0E	2,200.0	1997	Georgian main witch.
Salme Dorsa	58.0N	25.2E	447.0	1991	Salme, Estonian sky maiden.
Saule Dorsa	58.0S	206.0E	1,375.0	1994	Saulė, Lithuanian and Latvian sun goddess.
Szél-anya Dorsa (dropped 1985)	79.4N	81.3E	975.0	1985	Hungarian wind goddess.
Semuni Dorsa	75.9N	8.0E	514.0	1985	Semuni, Ulchian (Siberia) sky goddess.
Shishimora Dorsa	37.0N	297.0E	800.0	1997	E.Slavic night and dreams deity.
Sige Dorsa	31.2N	106.9E	478.0	1991	Sige, Babylonian sky goddess.
Siksaup Dorsa	73.0S	228.0E	650.0	1997	Siksaup, Kachin (Burma/Myanmar) sun goddess.
Sinanevt Dorsa	66.5N	171.0E	1,800.0	1997	Sinanevt, Itelmen (Kamchatka) Raven's daughter, wife of sky man.
Sirona Dorsa	43.5S	193.5E	700.0	1997	Sirona, Celtic sky goddess.
Sogbo Dorsa	40.0S	237.0E	900.0	1997	Sogbo, Fon (Benin) thunder goddess/god.
Spidola Dorsa	73.5S	325.0E	950.0	1997	Spīdola, Latvian mythological heroine.
Sunna Dorsa	53.0S	134.0E	500.0	1997	Sunna, Norse sun goddess.
Surupa Dorsa	71.7N	209.0E	981.0	1997	Surupa, Hindu sky goddess, bringer of rain.
Tezan Dorsa (dropped 1985)	81.4N	47.1E	1,079.0	1985	Etruscan dawn goddess.
Tikoiwuti Dorsa	56.0N	225.0E	1,000.0	1997	Tikoiwuti, Hopi goddess of darkness.
Tinianavyt Dorsa	51.0S	239.0E	1,500.0	1997	Koryak (Kamchatka) wife of sky man.
Tomem Dorsa	31.2N	7.2E	970.0	1985	Ketian (Siberia) Mother of the hot; lives in the sky, near the Sun.
Tsovinar Dorsa	46.0S	254.0E	1,100.0	1997	Tsovinar – Armenian lightning deity.
Tukwunag Dorsa	69.0S	155.0E	1,000.0	1997	Tukwunag, Hopi cumulus cloud maiden ('kachina').
Unelanuhi Dorsa	12.0N	87.0E	2,600.0	1997	Unelanuhi, Cherokee sun goddess.
Uni Dorsa	33.7N	114.3E	800.0	1985	Etruscan goddess, same as Hera or Juno.
Unuk Dorsa	4.5S	351.5E	400.0	1997	Unuk, Eskimo (Chukotka) night maiden.
Urkuk Dorsa	12.0S	320.0E	600.0	1997	Urkuk, ivkhi (Sakhalin Isl.) night maiden.
Vaiva Dorsum	53.2S	204.0E	520.0	1994	Lithuanian rainbow goddess.
Varma-Ava Dorsa	62.3N	268.8E	767.0	1985	Mordvinian (Volga Finn) wind goddess.
Vedma Dorsa	42.0N	159.0E	3,345.0	1985	East Slav witch.
Vejas-mate Dorsa	70.5S	245.0E	1,600.0	1997	Vēja māte, Latvian wind goddess.
Vetsorgo Dorsum	6.5S	163.0E	700.0	2000	Mordovian/Erzya (Volga Finn) daughter of the supreme sky god Nishke.
Wala Dorsa	17.0S	62.0E	500.0	1997	Fox (US Plains) name of the dawn.
Yalyane Dorsa	7.0N	177.0E	1,200.0	1997	Yalyane, Nenets (Samoyed) maiden of light.
Yumyn-Udyr Dorsa	81.4N	164.7E	1,086.0	1985	Yumyn-Udyr, Marian (Volga Finn) daughter of main god.
Zaryanitsa Dorsa	0.0N	170.0E	1,100.0	1997	Zaryanitsa, E.Slavic night lightning goddess.
Zimcerla Dorsa	47.5S	73.5E	850.0	1997	Zimcerla, W.Slavic dawn goddess.
Zorile Dorsa	39.9N	338.4E	1,041.0	1985	Zorile, Moldavian dawn goddess.

== Colles ==
Name	Latitude	Longitude	Diameter (km)	Year named	Name origin
Akkruva Colles	46.1N	115.5E	1,059.0	1985	Saami-Lapp fishing goddess.
Asherat Colles	12.0N	162.0E	500.0	2003	Asherah, Phoenician goddess known as "Asherat-of-the-Sea."
Chernava Colles	10.5S	335.5E	1,000.0	1997	Chernava, East Slavic sea maiden, Sea Czar's daughter.
Jurate Colles	56.8N	153.5E	418.0	1985	Lithuanian sea goddess from the tale of Jūratė and Kastytis.
Marake Colles	55.7N	217.8E	150.0	1997	Mansi (Ob River Ugra) sea mistress.
Mena Colles	52.5S	160.0E	850.0	1994	Roman goddess of menses.
Migazesh Colles	49.0S	198.0E	230.0	2000	Adygan (North Caucasus) daughter of sea goddess.
Molpe Colles	76.0N	192.0E	548.0	1991	Greek; mother of Siren.
Nahete Colles	38.0N	241.0E	400.0	1997	Fon (Benin) wife of sea god Agbe.
Nuliayoq Colles	48.0N	224.0E	350.0	1997	Nuliajuk, Netsilik Inuit (Hudson Bay Eskimo) sea mistress; similar to Sedna.
Olosa Colles	18.0N	353.3E	200.0	1997	Yoruba (Nigeria) lagoon goddess.
Ran Colles	1.0N	163.0E	400.0	2003	Rán, Scandinavian sea goddess.
Ruad Colles	68.0S	118.0E	400.0	1997	Irish female deity, sank into the sea sleeping in her bronze boat.
Salofa Colles	63.0S	167.0E	250.0	1997	Samoan tale's girl/sea turtle.
Tʻien Hu Colles	30.7N	15.1E	947.0	1991	Tianhou, a Chinese sea goddess.
Urutonga Colles	10.0N	154.0E	500.0	2003	Urutonga, Māori sea goddess.

== Chasmata ==
Name	Latitude	Longitude	Diameter (km)	Year named	Name origin
Aikhylu Chasma	32.0N	292.0E	300.0	1997	Aikhylu Bashkir myth's moon daughter.
Aranyani Chasma	69.3N	74.4E	718.0	1985	Aranyani Indian forest goddess.
Ardwinna Chasma	21.0N	197.0E	500.0	1997	Ardwinna Continental Celtic wildwood goddess.
Artemis Chasma	41.2S	138.5E	3,087.0	1982	Artemis Greek goddess of hunt/moon.
Artio Chasma	35.5S	39.0E	450.0	1997	Artio Celtic wildlife bear-goddess.
Baba-Jaga Chasma	53.2N	49.5E	580.0	1985	Baba-Jaga Slavic forest witch.
Britomartis Chasma	33.0S	130.0E	1,000.0	1994	Greek/Cretan goddess of the hunt.
Chang Xi Chasmata	59.0S	17.0E	220.0	1997	Chang Xi Chinese, gave birth to twelve moons.
Chondi Chasma	18.5S	230.0E	1,000.0	2003	Chondi Bengali goddess of wild animals.
Dali Chasma	17.6S	167.0E	2,077.0	1982	Georgian; goddess of hunt.
Daura Chasma	73.8N	53.8E	729.0	1985	Hausa (W.Sudan) great huntress.
Devana Chasma	16.0N	285.0E	4,600.0	1982	Czech goddess of hunting.
Dewi Ratih Chasma	6.5S	359.7E	1,000.0	2000	Bali (Indonesia) moon goddess.
Diana Chasma	14.8S	154.8E	938.0	1982	Roman goddess of hunt/moon.
Dziwica Chasma	16.5S	235.0E	1,300.0	2003	Dziwica Forest maiden in myths of Luzicke Serby/Sorben/Wenden, W.Slavic group in E.Germany.
Gamsilg Chasma	46.0S	64.0E	600.0	1997	Gamsilg Chechen and Ingush evil forest deity.
Ganis Chasma	14.5N	194.0E	615.0	1982	Ganis Western Lapp forest maiden.
Geyaguga Chasma	56.5S	70.0E	800.0	1997	Geyaguga Cherokee moon deity.
Gui Ye Chasma	9.0S	337.1E	210.0	1997	Gui Ye Chinese moon fairy.
Hanghepiwi Chasma	48.5S	18.0E	1,100.0	1997	Hanghepiwi Dakota name of the moon and night.
Hanwi Chasma	10.5N	247.0E	1,800.0	2006	Hanwi Oglala (Sioux) moon and sky goddess.
Hecate Chasma	18.2N	254.3E	3,145.0	1982	Greek moon goddess.
Heng-o Chasma	6.6N	355.5E	734.0	1982	Heng-o, Chinese moon goddess.
Hina Chasma	63.7N	20.0E	415.0	1991	Hina, Hawaiian moon goddess.
Ix Chel Chasma	10.0S	73.4E	503.0	1982	Ix Chel, Aztec wife of the Sun god; probably moon goddess.
Jana Chasma	12.2S	117.9E	650.0	2003	Jana, Roman moon goddess.
Juno Chasma	30.5S	111.1E	915.0	1982	Roman sky goddess; sister and consort of Jupiter.
Kaygus Chasmata	49.6N	52.1E	503.0	1985	Kaygus Ketian (Siberia) ruler of forest animals.
Kicheda Chasma	2.5S	213.0E	1,500.0	2003	Kicheda Nganasan (Taymyr Peninsula Samoyed) lunar goddess.
Kokomikeis Chasma	0.0N	85.0E	1,000.0	1997	Kokomikeis Blackfoot/Algonquin moon goddess.
Kottravey Chasma	30.5N	77.9E	744.0	1985	Kottravey Dravidian (India) hunting goddess.
Kov-Ava Chasma	58.8S	21.8E	470.0	1997	Mordovian (Volga River Finn) forest mistress.
Kozhla-Ava Chasma	56.2N	50.6E	581.0	1985	Marian (Volga Finn) forest goddess.
Kuanja Chasma	12.0S	99.5E	890.0	1982	Mbundu goddess of the spirit of the hunt.
Lasdona Chasma	69.3N	36.8E	697.0	1985	Lithuanian main forest goddess.
Latona Chasma	26.0N	267.5E	530.0	1997	Roman moon goddess.
Lesavka Chasma	0.8S	215.0E	800.0	2003	E.Slavic forest deity, daughter of the forest father Leshiy and the swamp deity Kikimora.
Medeina Chasma	46.2N	89.3E	606.0	1985	Medeina, Lithuanian forest goddess.
Mežas-Mate Chasma	51.0N	50.7E	506.0	1985	Meža māte, Latvian forest goddess.
Misne Chasma	78.3N	316.5E	610.0	1985	Mansi (Siberia) forest maiden.
Mist Chasma	39.5N	247.3E	244.0	1997	Norse Valkyrie.Changed from Mist Fossae.
Morana Chasma	68.9N	24.6E	317.0	1985	Czech moon goddess.
Mots Chasma	51.9N	56.1E	464.0	1985	Mots Avarian (Caucasus) moon goddess.
Nang-byon Chasma	4.0N	316.5E	450.0	1997	Thaichang/White Thai (Vietnam) moon goddess.
Olapa Chasma	42.0S	208.5E	650.0	1997	Olapa Massai (Kenya, Tanzania) moon goddess.
Parga Chasmata	20.0S	255.0E	11,000.0	1982	Parga Nenets (Samoyed) forest witch.(Feature extent expanded in 2001.)
Pinga Chasma	20.0S	287.0E	500.0	1997	Pinga Inuit goddess of hunt; moon god Igaluk is subordinate to her.
Quilla Chasma	23.7S	127.3E	973.0	1982	Quilla Inca moon goddess.
Rabie Chasma	10.5S	267.0E	950.0	2000	Rabie Wemale (E.Indonesia) moon goddess.
Ralk-umgu Chasma	15.0S	106.0E	840.0	2003	Ralk-umgu Nivkhan (Sakhalin Island) "lunar woman."
Reitia Chasma	51.5S	100.0E	400.0	1997	Reitia Italian (Venetian) healthcare and hunting goddess.
Seo-Ne Chasma	63.5S	26.0E	430.0	1997	Korean moon deity, sun's wife.
Sutkatyn Chasmata	64.0S	11.0E	350.0	1997	Sutkatyn Kumyk (Daghestan) forest spirit.
Tellervo Chasma	60.0S	125.0E	600.0	1997	Tellervo Finnish maiden of woods.
Tkashi-mapa Chasma	13.0N	206.0E	1,100.0	1997	Tkashi-mapa Georgian forest goddess.
Tsects Chasma	61.6S	35.0E	600.0	1997	Tsects Haida (NW Coast) friendly spirit of forest underworld – grandma mouse.
Varz Chasma	71.3N	27.0E	346.0	1985	Varz Lezghin (Caucasus) moon goddess.
Vir-ava Chasma	16.5S	124.0E	1,700.0	1982	Vir-ava Mordvinian forest mother.
Vires-Akka Chasma	75.6N	341.6E	742.0	1985	Vires-Akka Saami-Lapp forest goddess.
Xaratanga Chasma	54.0S	70.0E	1,300.0	1997	Xaratanga Purépecha (Mexico) moon goddess.
Zewana Chasma	9.0N	212.0E	900.0	1997	Zewana W.Slavic/Polish hunting goddess.
Žverine Chasma	18.5N	271.0E	1,300.0	1997	Žvėrinė, Lithuanian hunting goddess.

== See also ==
- List of coronae on Venus
- List of craters on Venus
- List of extraterrestrial dune fields
- List of montes on Venus
- List of terrae on Venus
