= Makoni (surname) =

Makoni is a Zimbabwean surname. Notable people with the surname include:

- Betty Makoni, Zimbabwean women's rights activist
- Julius Makoni, Zimbabwean Anglican bishop
- Simba Makoni, Zimbabwean politician
- Lavender Makoni, Zimbabwean judge
- Steve Makoni, Zimbabwean songwriter
- Tanunurwa Makoni, Zimbabwean cricketer

== See also ==
- Makoni
