= Allie Vibert Douglas =

Canadian astronomer

Allie Vibert Douglas OC MBE
- Born: Alice Douglas Vibert; 14 December 1894; Montreal, Quebec, Canada
- Died: July 2, 1988 (aged 93); Kingston, Ontario, Canada
- Education: McGill University (B.A., M.S., Ph.D.)
- Scientific career
- Fields: Astronomy, astrophysics
- Institutions: McGill University; Queen's University at Kingston

Alice Vibert Douglas OC MBE (née Douglas Vibert; December 15, 1894 – July 2, 1988), who usually went by her middle name, was a Canadian astronomer and astrophysicist.

== Early life and education ==
Douglas was born in Montreal, Quebec, on 15 December 1894 to parents John Albert Vibert and Allie Douglas. Douglas's mother died the year she was born, and her father died in 1904, leaving her and her brother, George, to be raised by her aunts and grandmother in London, England. Born "Alice Douglas Vibert", Douglas and her brother took "Vibert" as their middle name and "Douglas" as their last in 1920 honour of their aunt and their mother.

Douglas' grandfather was Rev. George Douglas, a prominent Methodist minister and educator. In 1904 both Douglas and her brother returned to Montreal where they attended Westmount High School. Growing up, Douglas was interested in science but felt that her gender was a handicap. In high school, she was refused admission to a small science club solely because she was a woman. Her brother helped her circumvent this issue by leaving the door ajar and letting Douglas sit outside the classroom to listen to lectures. Douglas graduated at the top of her class and received a scholarship to McGill University.

In 1912 she began her studies in honors mathematics and physics at McGill, but they were interrupted during her third year by the outbreak of World War I. Her brother George enlisted as an officer, was stationed near London, England and moved his family, including Douglas, with him. Douglas was then invited to join the war effort by a family friend and decided to work in the War Office as a statistician. Although bombs would fall close to her workplace, Douglas persevered and had the highest payout of all of the temporary women civil servants in the National Service. In 1918, at the age of 23, she was appointed Member of the Order of the British Empire (MBE) for her work.

Having returned to Montreal in 1920, she continued her studies, earning a bachelor's degree and then a master's degree in 1921. She went on to the University of Cambridge, working with Ernest Rutherford at the Cavendish Laboratory and studying under Arthur Eddington, one of the leading astronomers of the day. She earned her PhD in astrophysics through McGill in 1926 and was the first person to receive it from a Quebec university, and one of the first women to accomplish this in North America. Douglas wrote an important biography of Eddington, The Life of Arthur Eddington at the request of his sister, Winnifred.

== Scientific career ==
After completing her doctorate, Douglas joined the faculty at McGill, lecturing in physics and astrophysics. In 1939 she moved to Queen's University at Kingston where she served as Dean of Women until 1958. She was a professor of astronomy from 1946 until her retirement in 1964 and was instrumental in having women accepted into engineering and medicine. During World War II she established that all students had to complete two mandatory hours of "contribution to the war effort", set up knitting stations for women between classes, and required all new students to go take nursing classes. She became the first Canadian president of the International Federation of University Women from 1947-1950.

Douglas was an active member of the Royal Astronomical Society of Canada (RASC) and became female president in 1943. It was largely due to her work that the Kingston Centre of the RASC was founded in 1961.

Collaborating with John Stuart Foster, she researched the spectra of A and B type stars and the Stark effect using the Dominion Astrophysical Observatory. In 1947 she became the first Canadian president of the International Astronomical Union and represented Canada during a UNESCO conference in Montevideo, Uruguay, seven years later. In 1967 she became an Officer of the Order of Canada and was named one of 10 Women of the Century by the National Council of Jewish Women. She received honorary doctorates from McGill, Queen's and Queensland Universities.

== Personal life ==
Douglas never married, though she remained close with her brother George and his family throughout her life.

Douglas had a love of travel, and visited dozens of countries in her lifetime, including Russia, China, Czechoslovakia, and India. As of 2003, she held the Canadian record for attending the largest number of International Astronomical Union meetings.

She lived in Kingston until her death on 2 July 1988 at the age of 93.

== Legacy ==
Vibert Douglas has a patera (an irregular or complex crater) on Venus named after her. Vibert-Douglas Patera is located at 11.6° South latitude 194.3° East longitude. It is almost circular and 45 km in diameter. In 1988, the year of her death, asteroid 3269 was named Vibert Douglas in her honor. She has a wing in Jean Royce Hall on Queen's University campus named after her.

== See also ==
- List of craters on Venus
- List of geological features on Venus § Paterae
