= Makoni =

Makoni may refer to:

- Makoni District, a district in Manicaland Province of northeastern Zimbabwe
- Makoni Central, a constituency of the Parliament of Zimbabwe
- Makoni North, a constituency of the Parliament of Zimbabwe
- Makoní language, an extinct Maxakalian language of Brazil
- Makoni (surname), list of people with surname Makoni
