= Steve Makoni =

Zimbabwean comedian, songwriter and guitarist

Steve Makoni is a comedian, songwriter and solo guitarist from Zimbabwe.

== Background ==
Makoni is perhaps best known for his hit "Sabhuku Nedhongi". After a period of inactivity he made a comeback performance in December, 2009. He also penned and sang the woman empowering song "Handiende" about a wife telling her husband that she will not go as the husband wants to remarry but would rather stay for her kids. Another song he is known for is "Zvachonyana" which is a song about the realities and exaggerations of love, for instance, kana usipo, handidye, apedza hupfu ndiyani? - which translates to if you aren't there my love, I won't eat, but then who is finishing the food in the cupboard. His comic take on realistic issues made him popular.
