= Ganis Chasma =

Chasma on Venus

Ganis Chasma is a group of rift zones on the surface of the planet Venus. Bright spots detected by the Venus Monitoring Camera on the European Space Agency's Venus Express in the area suggest that there may be active volcanism on Venus.

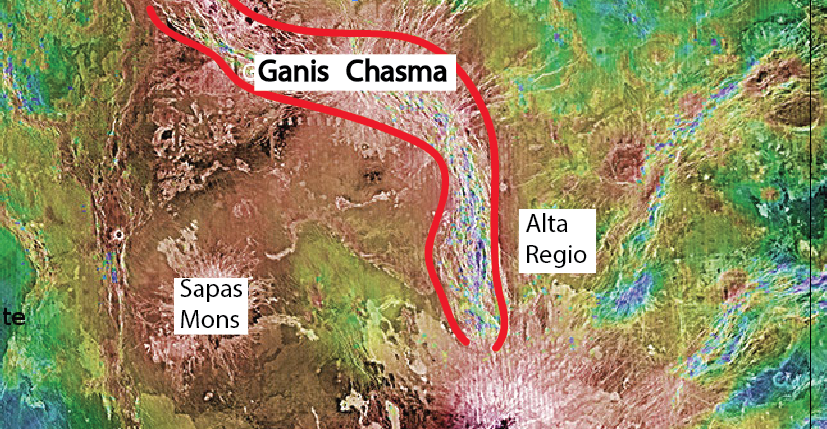
Image of the Ganis Chasma Rift Zone on Venus. Image taken by the Magellan spacecraft by NASA. Modified after Dinderman (2015).

== Introduction ==
Ganis Chasma consists of a group of rift zones located in the Ganiki Planitia Quadrangle on Venus. A chasma is defined as a long, narrow, steep sided depression on a planet. These depressions, or canyons, formed as a result of extensional tectonics due to volcanism. Ganis Chasma is associated with volcanism of Sapas Mons, a coronae feature located in the Alta Regio region of Venus. The rifts that make up Ganis Chasma formed in the shape of an arc along the edge of Sapas Mons, orientated in a north–south direction.

Little is known about ongoing volcanic activity on Venus. So far, no volcanic activity has been determined to have occurred in the last two million years. In 2008 and 2009 images taken by the Venus Monitoring Camera on the European Space Agency's (ESA) Venus Express (VEx) in eight observational sessions detected four bright transient spots along the edges of Ganis Chasma. In 2014, this was interpreted by Eugene Shalygin and his colleagues as active hotspot volcanism. The team suggests that transient bright spots observed in several consequent images of Ganis Chasma is the first direct evidence of current volcanic activity on Venus.

== Ganiki Planitia Quadrangle ==
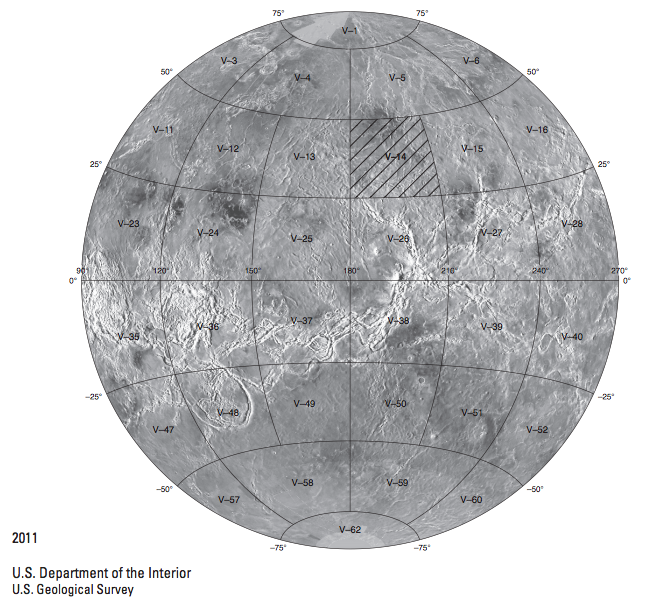
Location of the Ganiki Planitia Quadrangle

Ganis Chasma is located in the Ganiki Planitia Quadrangle. This quadrangle is positioned between two volcanic regions on Venus. To the north lies the Atlanta Planitia lowland which was formed as the result of mantle upwelling and downwelling. To the south lies Alta Regio. This region is a major volcanic rise and was formed as the result of mantle upwelling. The Ganiki Planitia Quadrangle was strongly influenced by mantle flow tectonics derived from these two regions. The area contains many volcanic, tectonic, and impact features. Ganis Chasma is one of the extensional features located in the region. Other features include grabens, troughs and lineaments. Chains of pit craters located throughout the Ganiki Planitia Quadrangle have been found to influence the formation and deformation of these extensional features.

== Tectonics ==
Ganis Chasma was formed due to extension associated with volcanism in Alpha Regio. It formed in the shape of an arc around the Sapas Mons, a corona feature associated with Alta Regio. There are two types of rift structures on Venus, rifts (or chasmata), and fracture belts. Ganis Chasma is younger than other chasmata on Venus, as evidenced by the lack of associated wrinkle ridges. Ganis Chasma has undergone additional deformation due to pit crater chains that induced fracturing along the rift zone.

== Possible volcanic activity ==
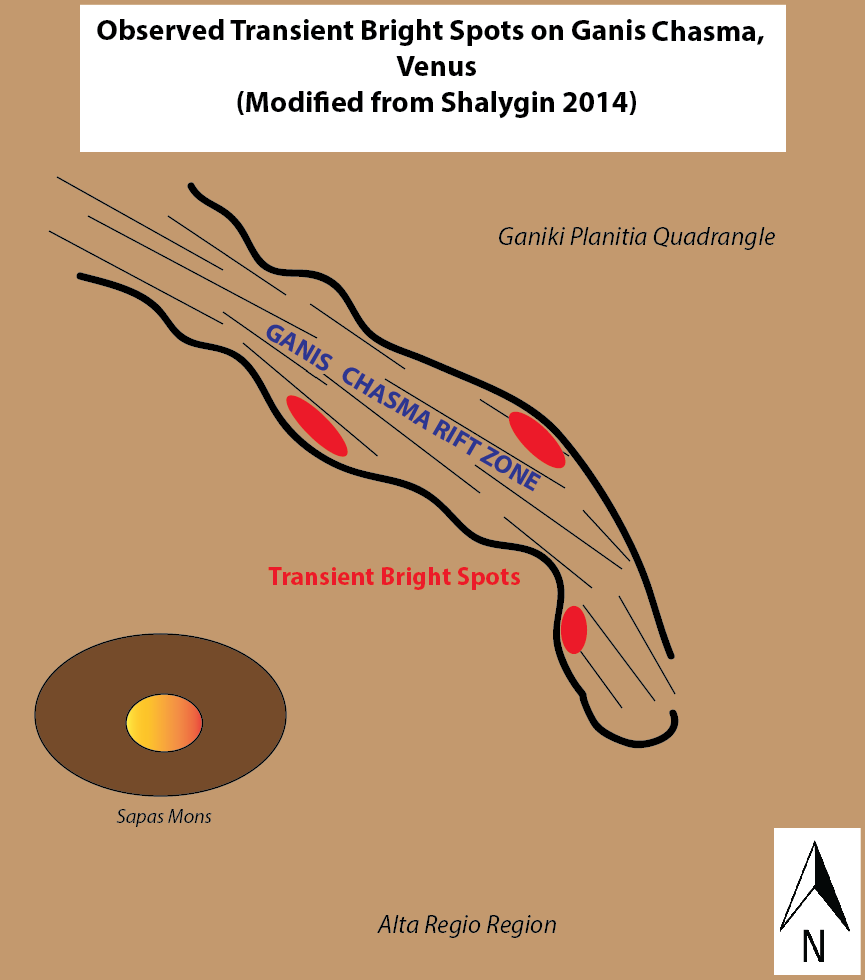
Locations of observed transient bright spots on Ganis Chasma, Venus. Modified from Shalygin (2014)

Previous studies have been conducted in search of current volcanic activity on Venus. These include observing increases in the amount of sulfur dioxide, a gas emitted by volcanoes, in Venus's upper atmosphere as well as observing possible lava flows emitting heat on Venus's surface. While these studies indicate presence of past volcanic activity, none could prove any volcanism occurring in the past 2 million years. In 2008 and 2009 images retrieved by the VEx Venus Monitoring Camera using a near infrared one micron filter indicated several transient bright spots located in Ganis Chasma along the edges of the rift zone. In 2014, these transient bright spots were interpreted by Eugene Shalyin and his colleagues as possible active hotspot volcanism. Shalygin and his team created mosaics of the images of the study area and created maps of relative surface brightness. They interpreted these bright spots as hot matter at or just above the surface due to the result of a process that releases hot matter such as lava or gas (volcanism). If this claim can be substantiated, it would be the first direct evidence of current volcanic activity on Venus.
