= Julius Makoni =

Anglican bishop

Julius Makoni was a banking executive in the City of London, who left his role in order to serve as an Anglican bishop in Zimbabwe. He was Bishop of Manicaland from 2009 to 2015. He subsequently returned to banking, with a position at the International Monetary Fund.

== Changing careers ==
Makoni had a successful career in banking. After roles with Morgan, Grenfell & Co., and then the World Bank Group, he moved to HSBC, where he held the position of Senior Adviser (emerging markets and principal investments). During this appointment he began studying theology, ultimately returning to university to obtain a theology diploma from the University of Cambridge. He was ordained as a deacon in 2008, and as a priest in 2009, serving in the Church of England.

== Appointment as Bishop ==
After only two weeks in office as a priest, Makoni was invited to become the Bishop of Manicaland, in Zimbabwe. The speed of progression from priesthood to episcopate is a record in modern times, and brought widespread commentary at the time. Makoni reports that some commentators drew parallels with the story of St Ambrose, a 4th-century Bishop of Milan whose own progression within the church hierarchy was similarly rapid. Makoni held the position of Bishop of Manicaland for six years, during a time of significant reconciliation and restructuring of the diocese, which was recovering from schism and state interference before Makoni's appointment. He resigned the role in 2015, in order to return to banking.

== Personal life ==
Maconi was married to Pauline Mutsa Makoni. She divorced Bishop Makoni in legal proceedings in the English courts which began in 2013, and concluded in December 2014. There were subsequent legal proceedings in Zimbabwe, where the courts upheld the legitimacy of the English court decisions, particularly in relation to the disposal of marital properties in both London and Zimbabwe.
