= Al-Uzza Undae =

Dune field on Venus

- Feature type: Dune field
- Location: Venus
- Coordinates: 67°42′N 90°30′E
- Diameter: 150 km (93 mi)
- Discoverer: Magellan, early 1990s
- Naming: 1994
- Eponym: Ussa, an Arabian goddess

Al-Uzza Undae is one of the two major dune fields on Venus. The dune field was named after the Ussa, an Arabian goddess of the desert. The name "Al-Uzza Undae" was officially approved by the International Astronomical Union (IAU) in 1994. It was discovered by the NASA spacecraft Magellan, in the early 1990s.

== Geology and characteristics ==
Its coordinates are 67°42′N 90°30′E, and it is 150 kilometres (93 mi) in diameter. As of 2014, it was thought to have recent activity.

== See also ==
- Surface features of Venus
