= Jaszai Patera =

Patera on Venus

Jászai Patera
- Feature type: Patera
- Coordinates: 32°N 305°E

Jászai Patera is a 40 km (25 mi) to 30 km (19 mi) wide volcanic caldera on Venus containing steep sided lava domes.
