= Wilhelmine Witte =

German astronomer

Wilhelmine Sophie Elizabeth Witte (née Böttcher; 17 November 1777 – 17 September 1854) was a German amateur astronomer. Böttcher was born in 1777 in Hanover, the daughter of Johanne Sophie Marie, (née Brinkmann; 1755–1824) and of senator Gottfried Ernst Böttcher (1750–1823). She married privy councilor Friedrich Christian Witte (1773–1854) on 17 November 1797 and they had 14 children, including Minna, Theodor and Friedrich Ernst.

She was interested in astronomy and bought her first telescope in 1815 (a Fraunhofer-Refrakter, the best telescope on the market at that time). She used this with the existing maps of the Moon's surface (by Johann Heinrich von Mädler) to develop a terrain model of the Moon. Her globe, with a diameter of 34 centimeters, was presented by Mädler at an 1839 congress in Bad Pyrmont and can be seen today at the Historisches Museum Hannover. One year before, she presented a draft version to the astronomer John Herschel. In 1840, she presented the globe to scientists and members of the Prussian royal household. It was afterwards bought by the royal family. In 1844, Witte prepared a new version of the globe which was presented by Herschel to the Society for the Advancement of Science at Cambridge.

In 2006 the IAU named a patera on Venus "Witte Patera" after her in honor of her exploits in mapping the topography of the Moon. In 2011, a street in the Kirchrode district of Hanover was named after her.
