= Iaso Tholus =

Tholus on Venus

- Feature type: Tholus
- Coordinates: 5.2°N 255.3°E
- Diameter: 30.0 km
- Eponym: Iaso

Iaso Tholus is a feature on Venus.
