= Lakshmi Planum =

Planum on Venus

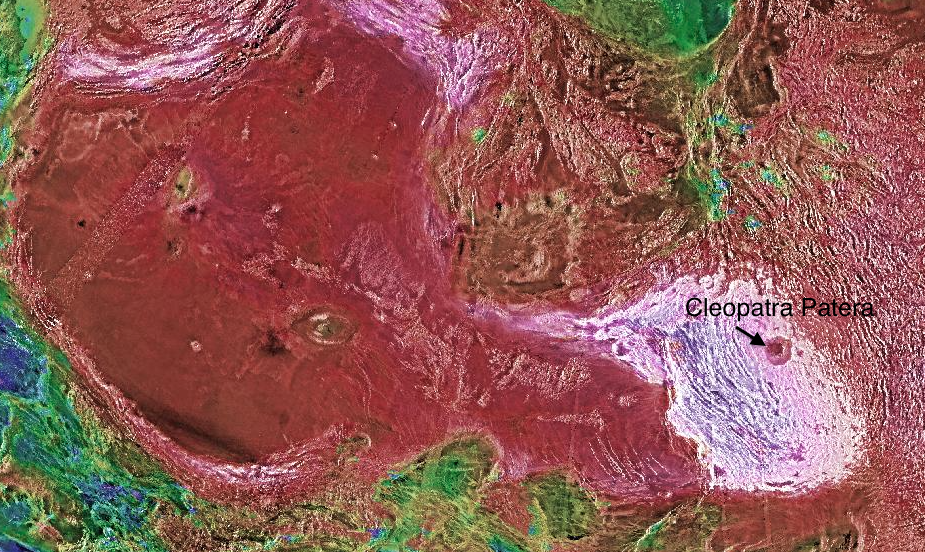
- Lakshmi Planum in dark red, in a topographically coloured radar image of Ishtar Terra
- Feature type: Planum
- Coordinates: 68.6°N 339.3°E
- Diameter: 2,345.0 km
- Eponym: Lakshmi

Lakshmi Planum is a plateau feature approximately 2 million km^{2} ringed by rugged mountains, the surface of Venus on the Western Ishtar Terra. It is named after Lakshmi, the Hindu goddess of wealth.

It is roughly 3.5 to 5 kilometers (2.2 to 3.1 mi) above the mean planetary radius, featuring two large oval depressions (Colette and Sacajawea).

The plains of Lakshmi are made up of radar-dark, homogeneous, smooth lava flows.

Lakshmi Planum is ringed by intensely deformed terrain, some of which is shown in the southern portion of the image and is called Clotho Tessera.

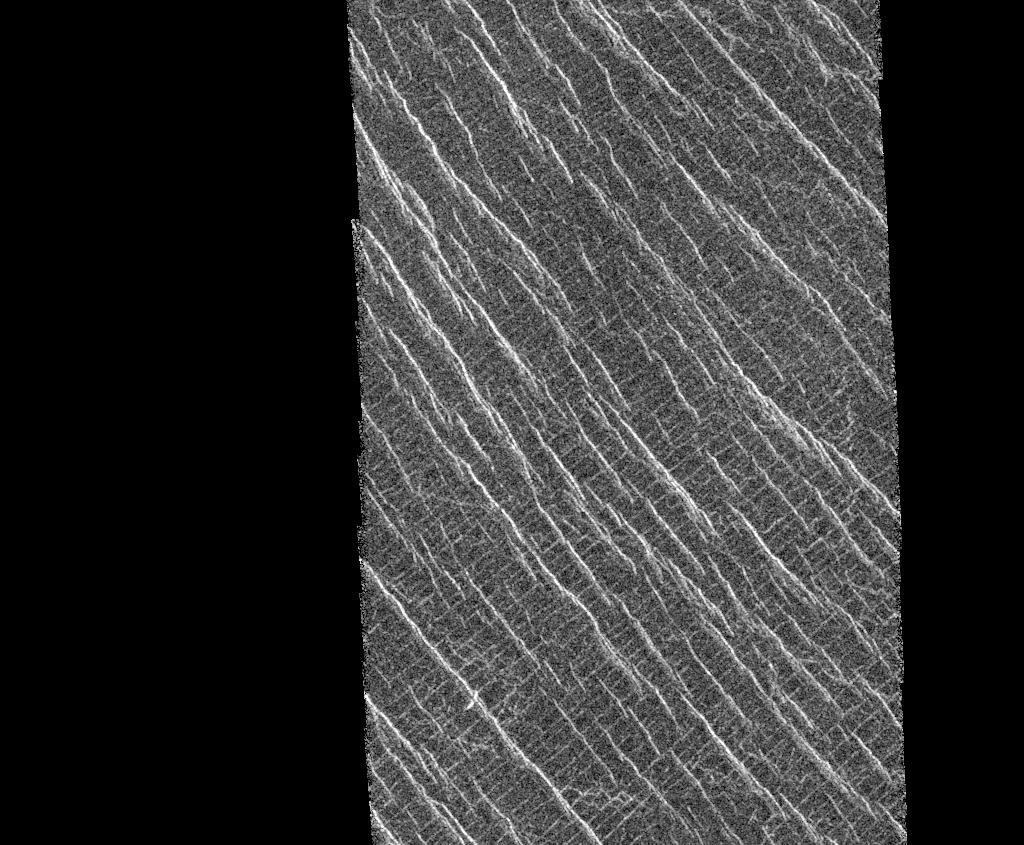
Lineated plains in Lakshmi Region.Two sets of parallel lineations are seen intersecting almost at right angles

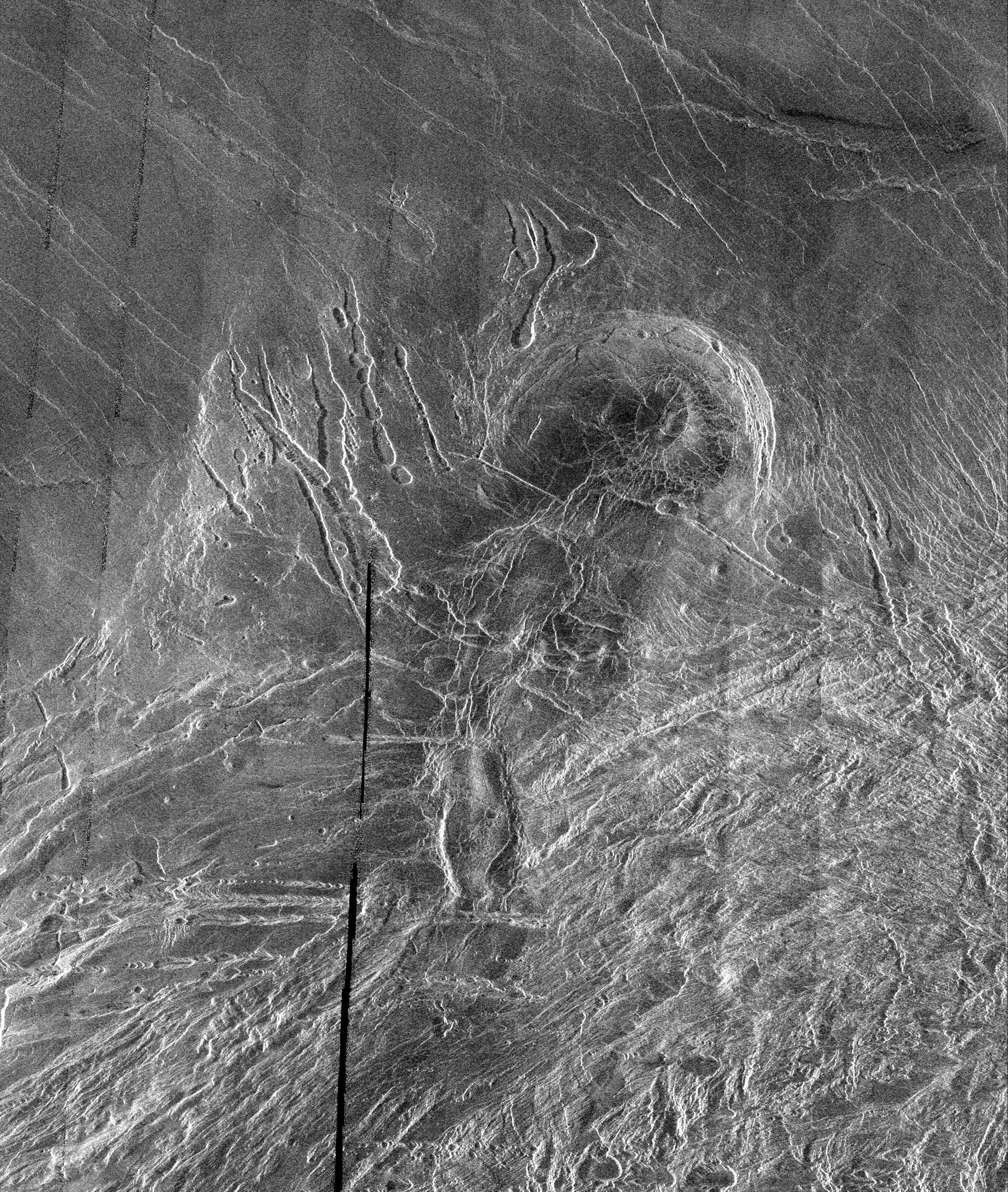
The radar smooth region in the northern part of the image is Lakshmi Planum, ringed by the intensely deformed terrain of Clotho Tessera.

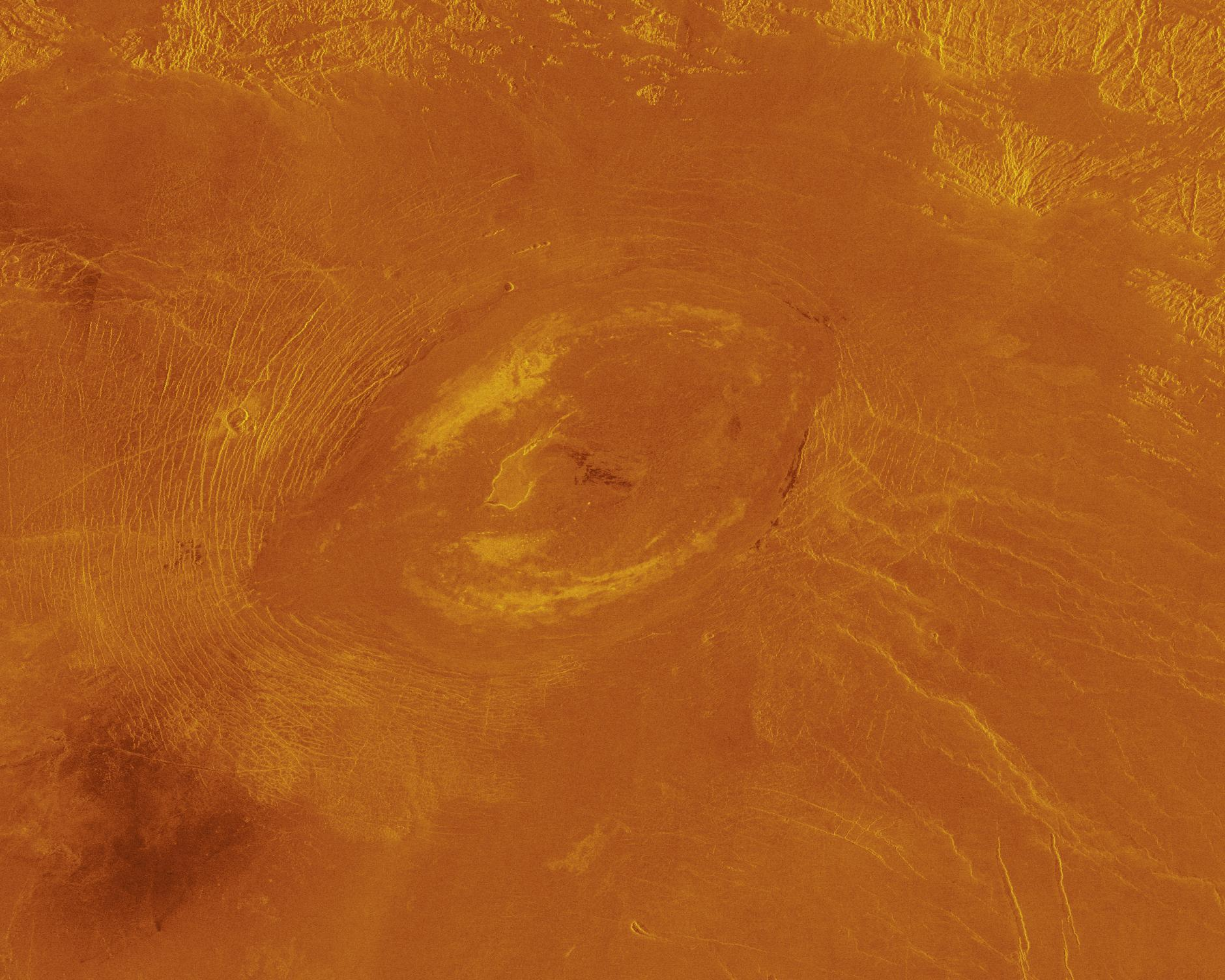
Sacajawea Patera, a large, elongate caldera on the smooth plateau of Lakshmi Planum, approximately 1.2 km deep and 120 by 215 km in diameter.
