= List of extraterrestrial dune fields =

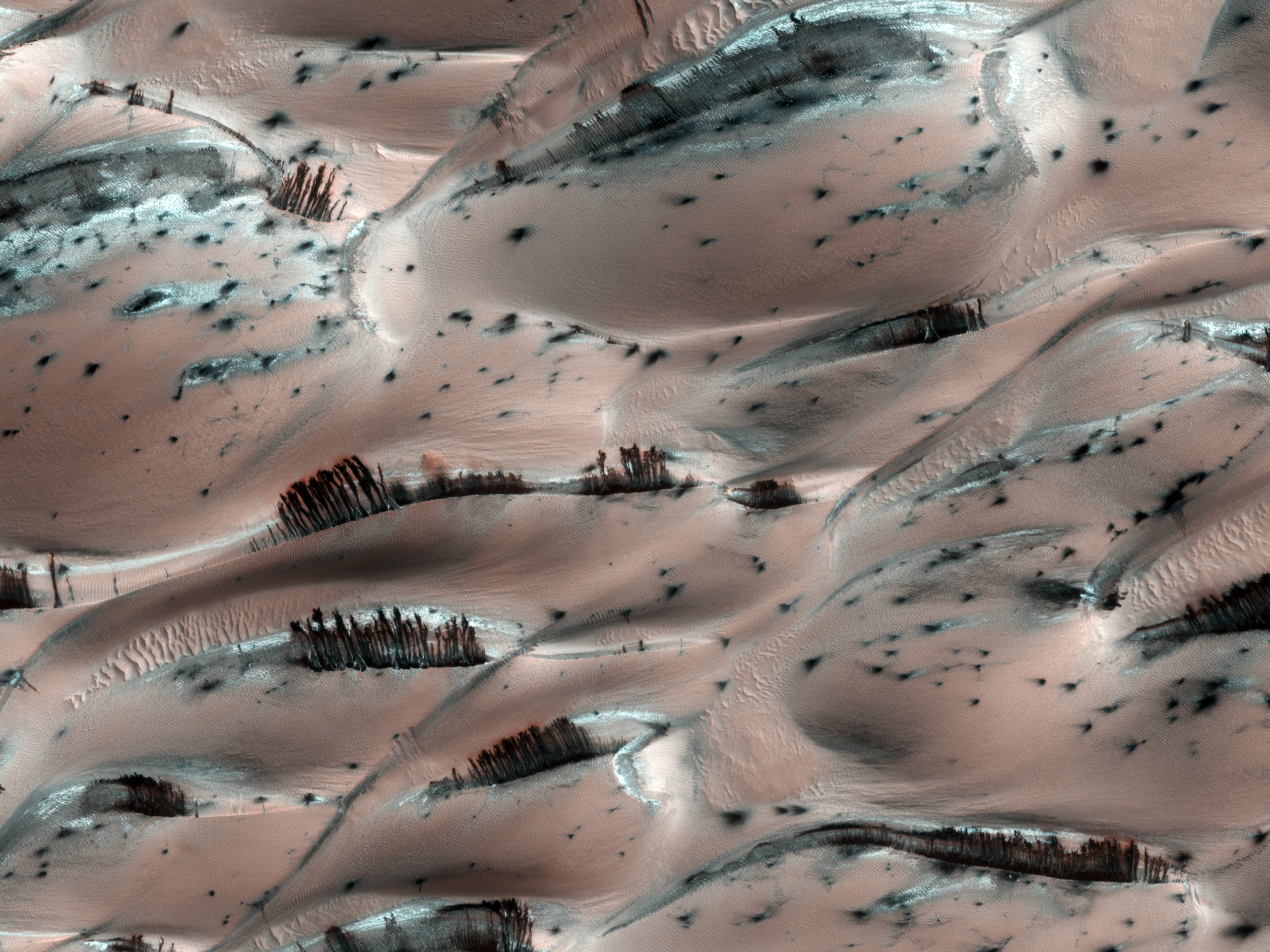
Tree-like dunes on Mars. Groups of dark brown streaks have been photographed by the Mars Reconnaissance Orbiter on melting pinkish sand dunes covered with light frost. The image was taken near the North Pole of Mars, spring 2010. Objects about 25 centimetres across are resolved on this image, which is about one kilometre wide. Close ups of some parts of this image show billowing plumes indicating that the sand slides were occurring at the time of the photo; see center left.

This is a list of dune fields not on Earth which have been given official names by the International Astronomical Union. Dune fields are named according to the IAU's rules of planetary nomenclature. The relevant descriptor term is undae. As of now, the only two Solar System planets, besides Earth, with named dune fields are Venus and Mars. Dune fields have also been discovered on Saturn's moon Titan, Pluto and comet 67P/Churyumov–Gerasimenko.

== Venus ==
There are three officially named dune fields on Venus. They are named after desert goddesses, as per the IAU's rules. They are listed below.

- Al-Uzza Undae 67.7N, 90.5E – named after Al-Uzza, an Arabian desert goddess.
- Menat Undae 24.8S, 339.4E - named after the Egyptian Goddess Hathor who was sometimes called Menat.
- Ningal Undae 9.0N, 60.7E – named after Ningal, the wife of the Sumerian desert god Sin.

== Mars ==
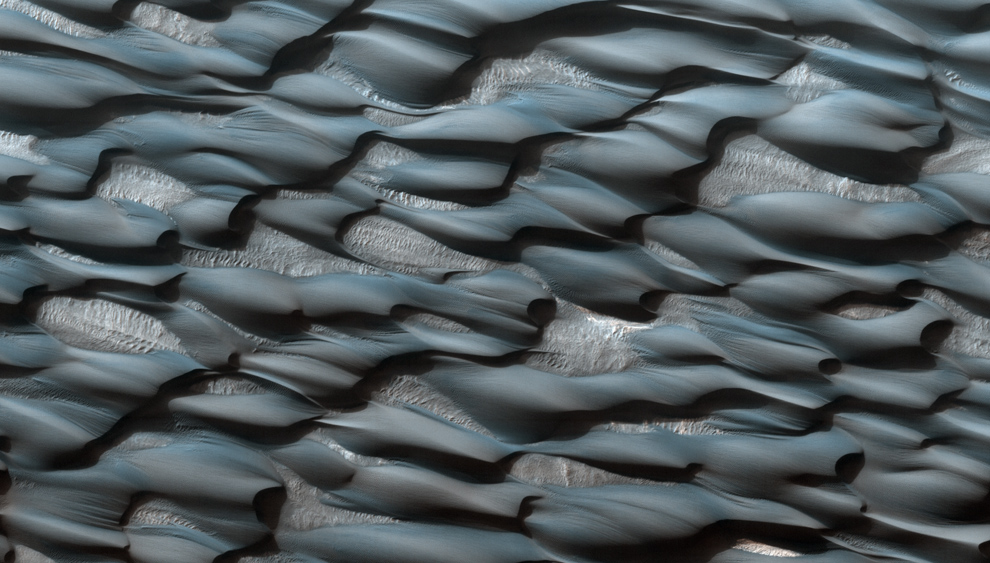
Dunes in Abalos Undae, Mars appear blueish due to basalt, while the reddish-white areas may be dust.

There are six officially named dune fields on Mars, which are named after nearby classical albedo features in accordance with the IAU's rules. Five of them lie between 75°N to 85°N, between Planum Boreum and Vastitas Borealis. These dune fields span over 200 degrees of longitude. The sixth, Ogygis Undae, lies on the southern hemisphere of Mars. They are listed below.

- Abalos Undae
- Aspledon Undae
- Hyperboreae Undae
- Ogygis Undae
- Olympia Undae
- Siton Undae

=== Unofficial field names ===
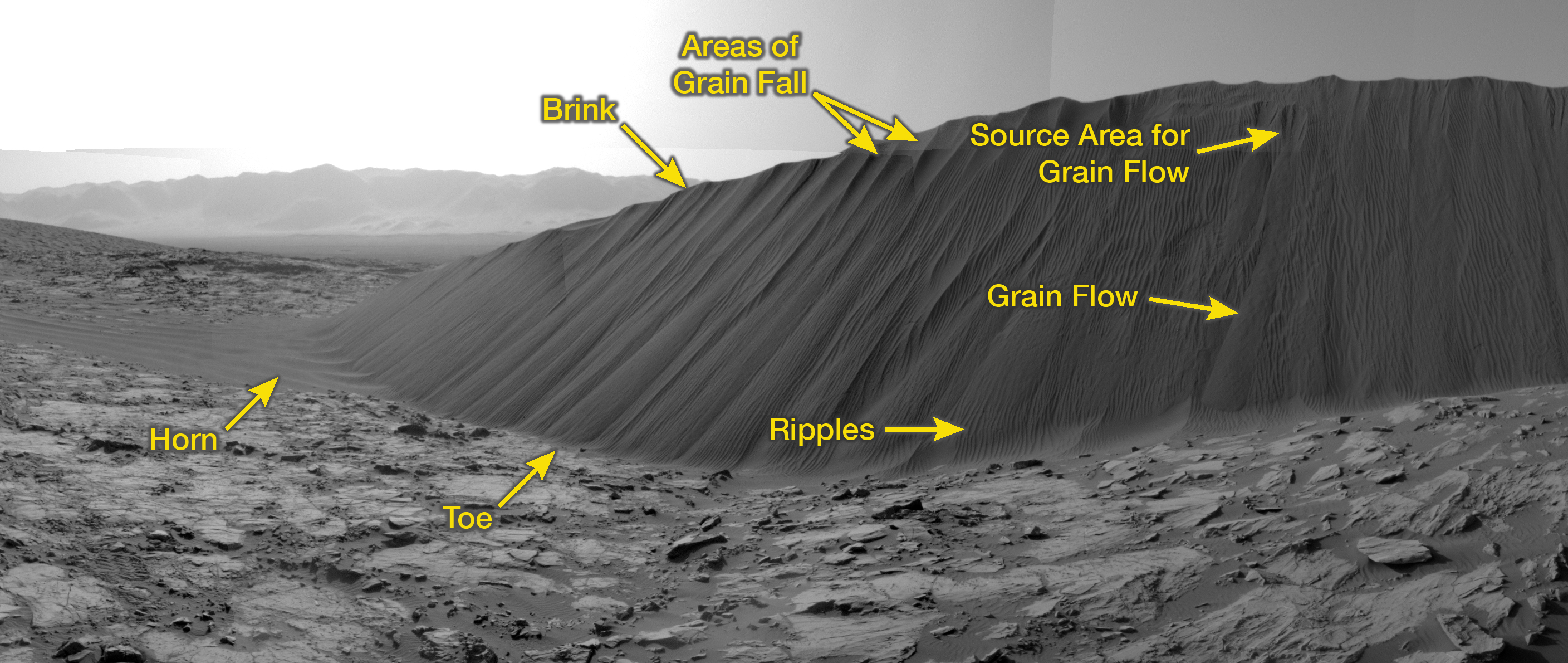
Namib sand dune (downwind side) on Mars (Curiosity rover; 17 December 2015).

- Bagnold dune field, Gale crater. This dune field was explored by Curiosity between initially between mission Sols ~1174–1248, where the rover investigated High dune, and Namib dune. Three orders of bedform were identified: wind ripple, large ripple (or wind drag ripple) and dune. Sand grains in this section of the dune field had a modal grain size of 120 μm
- Namib dune, Gale crater. This is a prominent feature that looks like the giant dunes of Africa's Namib Desert.
- As part of the Mars Exploration Rover mission, a small dune field unofficially named El Dorado on the south side of Husband Hill in Gusev crater was investigated by the Spirit rover from sols 706 to 710. Analysis of El Dorado showed that it consists of black wind-blown sand which is "well-sorted, well-rounded and olivine rich.

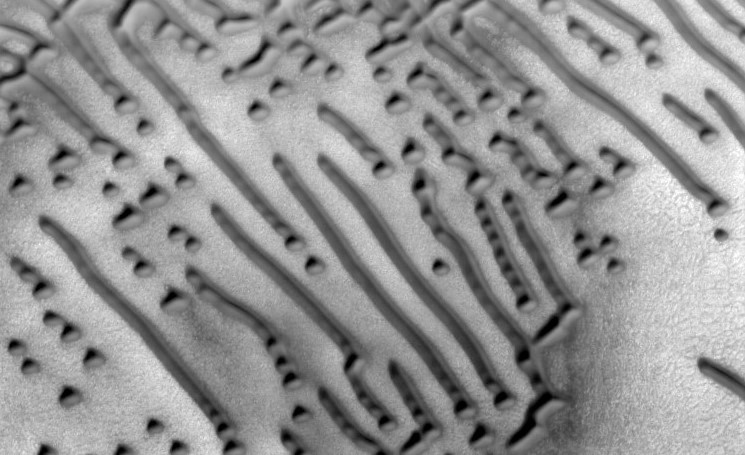
Detail of the dunes of the Hagal Dune Field

- The Hagal dune field is named after Frank Herbert's novel Dune and the fictional planet Hagal. The field is also known as the "Martian Morse Code" due to the similarity of the Dune shapes to Morse code dots and dashes.
- Nili Patera dune field

== Titan ==
There are five officially named dune fields on Titan, which are named after Greek gods, goddesses or personifications of wind. They are listed below:

- Aura Undae
- Boreas Undae
- Eurus Undae
- Notus Undae
- Zephyrus Undae

Literature also uses names of dark albedo features when referring to Titan's dune fields:

- Aztlan
- Belet
- Fensal
- Senkyo
- Shangri-La

== Pluto ==
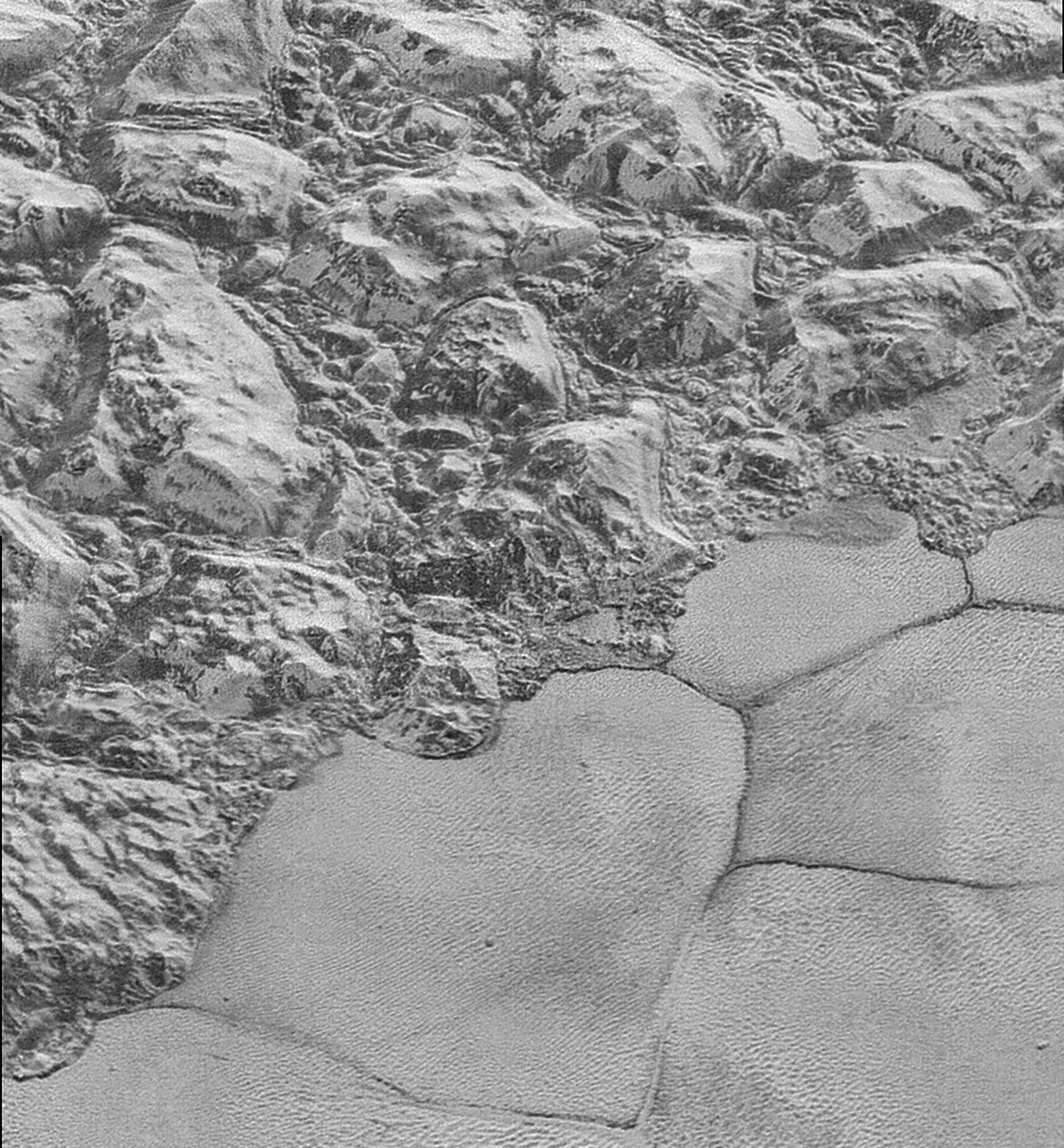
Dune fields in Sputnik Planitia near Planitia

Analysis of high resolution photos from New Horizons taken on 14 July 2015 of Pluto's Sputnik Planum region in 2018 has confirmed the presence of transverse dunes (perpendicular to the wind streaks) within the cellular nitrogen plains, spaced about 0.4 to 1 km apart, that are thought to be composed of 200–300 μm diameter particles of methane ice believed to be derived from the nearby Al-Idrisi Montes. These features are yet to be formally named.
