= Kadlu =

Inuit deity

- Abode: House supported by whalebone ribs
- Symbol: Hollow ice, dried seal skins
- Gender: Female

Genealogy
- Siblings: Kweetoo, Ignirtoq

In Inuit mythology, Kadlu refers to one of the trinity of sisters, the 3 goddesses creating thundery weather. She creates thunder by jumping on hollow ice, singing or rubbing together dried seal skins. Her sister Kweetoo creates lightning by rubbing stones against each other. The third sister, Ignirtoq, who makes lightning by striking two stones together and urinates with profusion which makes rain. The story tells that Kadlu was such a noisy child that her parents command her to play outside. There she invented the described "stormy game" with her sisters.

Kadlu and her sisters live in a large house supported by whalebone ribs.
