= Sacajawea Patera =

Venusian caldera

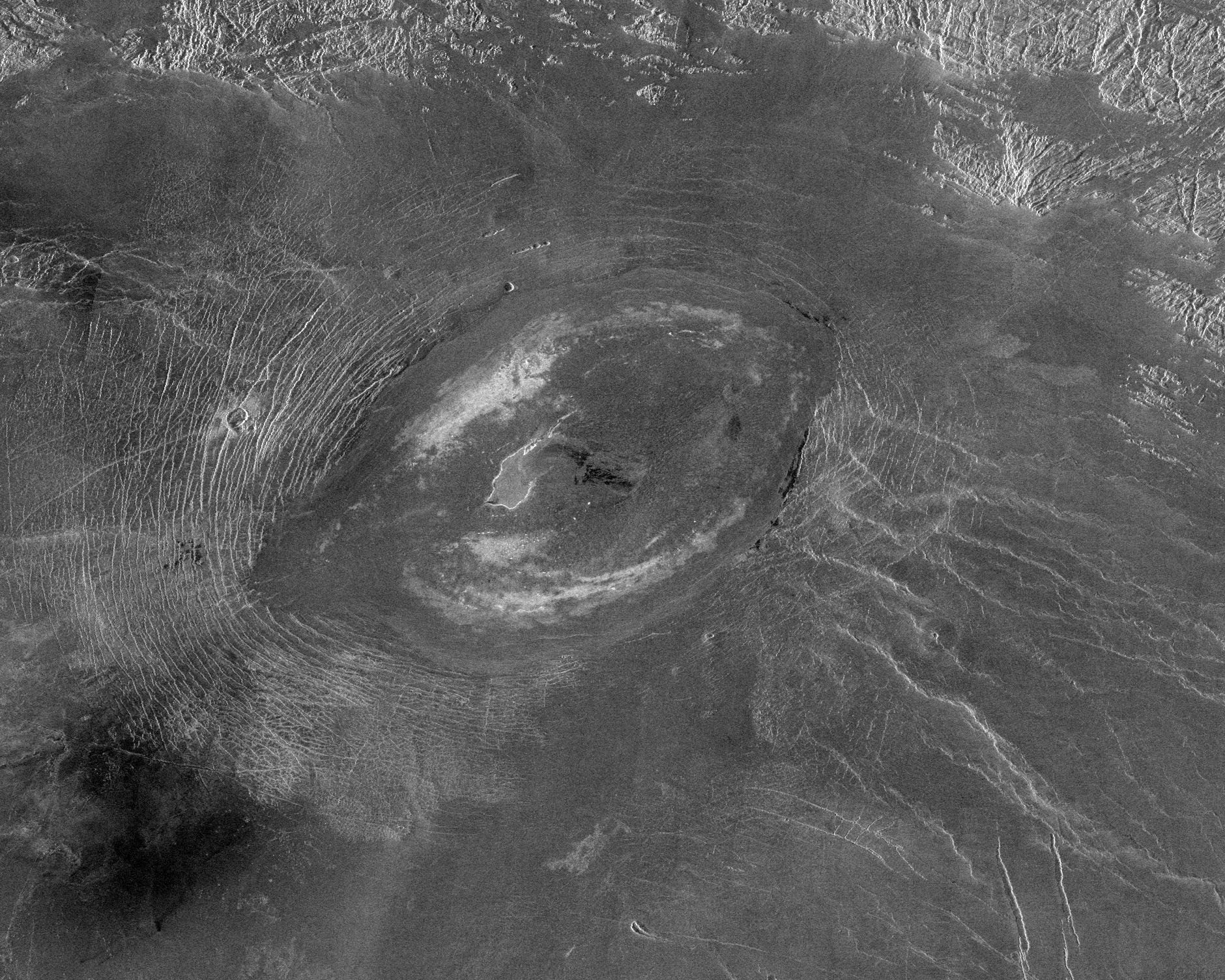
- Magellan radar image
- Feature type: Patera
- Coordinates: 64.3°N 335.4°E
- Diameter: 233 km
- Eponym: Sacajawea

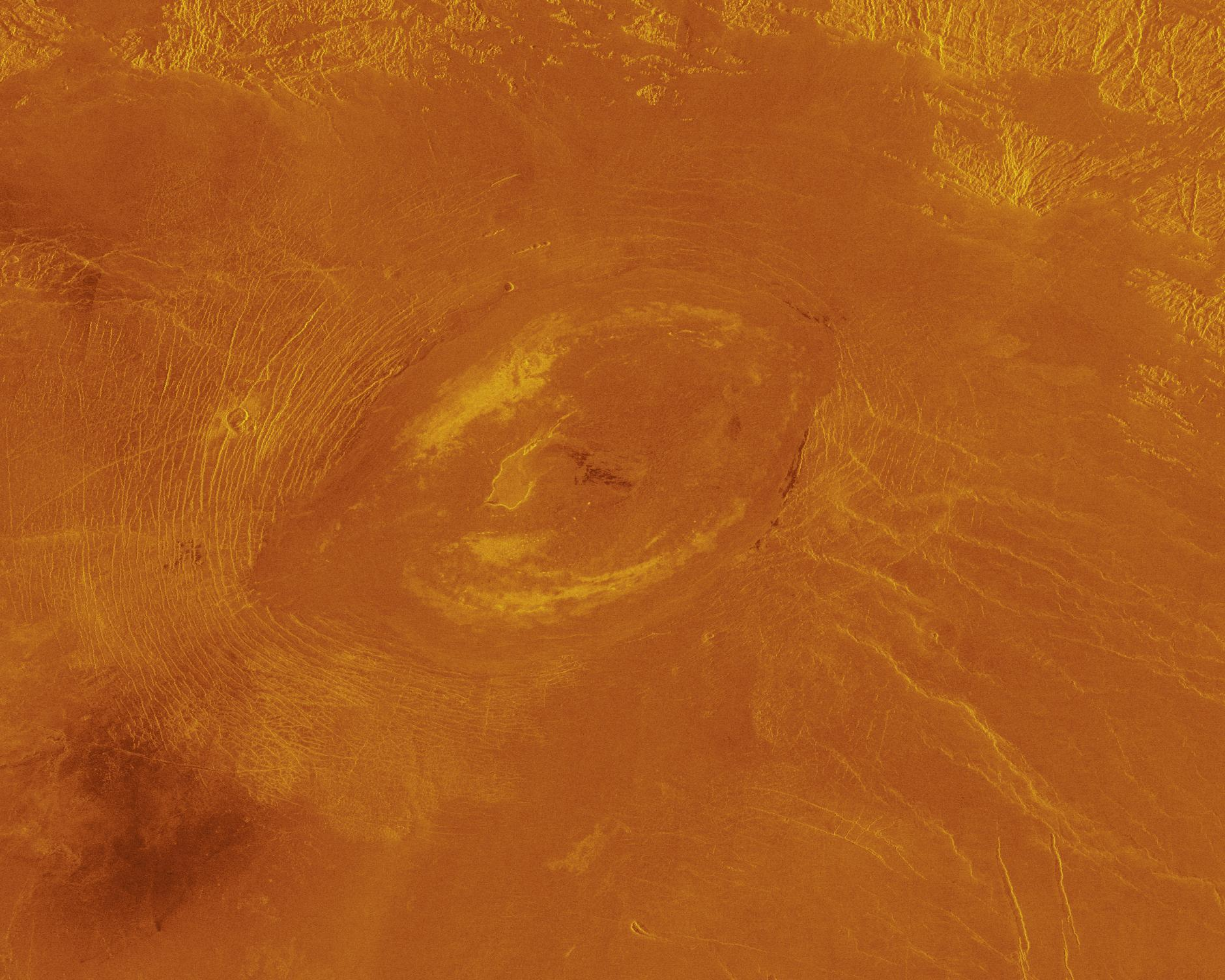
Color image of Sacajawea Petera

Sacajawea Patera is a large, elongate caldera located in Western Ishtar Terra on the smooth plateau of Lakshmi Planum, on the planet Venus. The image is centred at 64.5 degrees North latitude and 337 degrees East longitude. It is approximately 420 km (260 mi) wide at the base. Sacajawea is a depression approximately 1–2 kilometres (0.62–1.24 mi) deep and 120 by 215 kilometres (75 mi × 134 mi) in diameter; it is elongate in a southwest–northeast direction. The depression is bounded by a zone of circumferential curvilinear structures interpreted to be graben and fault scarps. These structures are spaced 0.5–4 kilometers (0.31–2.49 miles) apart, are 0.6–4.0 kilometers (0.37–2.49 miles) in width and up to 100 km (62 mi) in length.

Extending up to approximately 140 km (87 mi) in length from the southeast of the patera is a system of linear structures thought to represent a flanking rift zone along which the lateral injection and eruption of magma may have occurred. A shield edifice 12 km (7.5 mi) in diameter with a prominent central pit lies along the trend of one of these features.

The impact crater Zlata, approximately 6 km (3.7 mi) in diameter is located within the zone of graben to the northwest of the patera. Few flow features are observed in association with Sacajawea, possibly due to age and state of degradation of the flows. Mottled bright deposits 4–20 kilometers (2.5–12.4 miles) in width are located near the periphery and in the center of the patera floor within local topographic lows. Diffuse patches of dark material approximately 40 kilometers (25 mi) in width are observed southwest of the patera, superposed on portions of the surrounding graben.

The formation of Sacajawea is thought to be related to the drainage and collapse of a large magma chamber. Gravitational relaxation may have caused the resultant caldera to sag, producing the numerous faults and graben that circumscribe the patera. Regions of complex, highly deformed tessera-like terrain are located north and east of the patera and are seen in the upper portion of the image.
