= Sachs Patera =

Patera on Venus

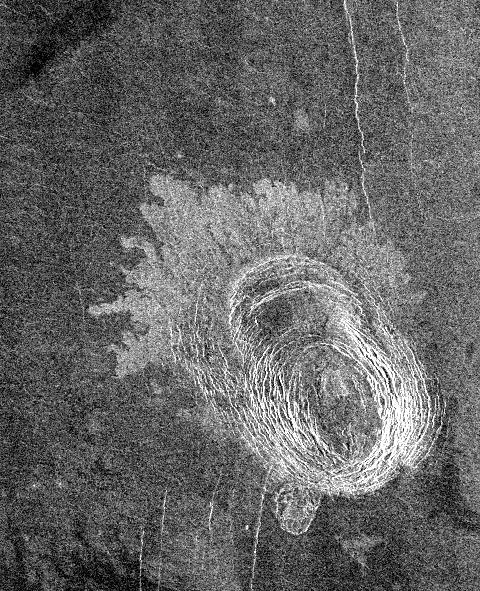
- Magellan radar image of Sachs
- Feature type: Patera
- Coordinates: 49.1°N 334.2°E
- Diameter: 65.0 km
- Eponym: Nelly Sachs

Sachs Patera is a feature on Venus. Defined as a sag-caldera, Sachs is an elliptical depression 130 meters (81 feet) in depth, spanning 40 kilometers (25 mi) in width along its longest axis. The morphology implies that a chamber of molten material drained and collapsed, forming a depression surrounded by concentric scarps spaced 2 to 5 kilometres (1.2 to 3.1 mi) apart. The arc-shaped set of scarps, extending out to the north from the prominent ellipse, is evidence for a separate episode of withdrawal; the small lobe-shaped extension to the southwest may represent an additional event. Solidified lava flows 10 to 25 kilometres (6.2 to 15.5 mi) long give the caldera its flower-like appearance. The flows are a lighter tone of gray in the radar data because the lava is blockier in texture and consequently returns more radar waves. Much of the lava, which was evacuated from the chamber, probably traveled to other locations underground, while some of it may have surfaced further south. This is unlike calderas on Earth, where a rim of lava builds up in the immediate vicinity of the caldera.
