= Von Gestern bis Heute =

Greatest hits album by Die Flippers
- Released: 1978
- Recorded: 1969–1978
- Genre: Schlager
- Label: Bellaphon

Die Flippers chronology
| Kinder des Sommers (1978) | Von Gestern bis Heute (1978) | Heimweh nach Tahiti (1979) |

Von Gestern bis Heute ("From Yesterday until Today") is the first major compilation album released by German Schlager group Die Flippers. It contains songs from the group's albums up until 1978's Kinder des Sommers, and one new song entitled "Manuela".

== Track listing ==
1. "Weine night, kleine Eva" (From Die Flippers)
2. "Luana" (From Das schönste im Leben)
3. "Marlena" (From Marlena)
4. "Surf Baby Surf" (From Marlena)
5. "Zwei Schatten am Fenster" (From Von Herz zu Herz)
6. "Manuela"
7. "Kinder des Sommers" (From Kinder des Sommers)
8. "Schau in den Spiegel, Du bist Schön" (From Kinder des Sommers)
9. "Südamerika" (From Marlena)
10. "Wenn weiße Wolken heimwärtz zieh'n" (From Von Herz zu Herz)
11. "Kleine Sonja" (From Marlena)
12. "Sha La La, I Love You" (From Die Flippers)

== Bibliography ==
- Von Gestern bis Heute at AllMusic. Retrieved 00:54, 10 December 2020 (UTC).
