= Marlana =

Marlana is a feminine given name. Notable people with the name include:

- Marlana Doyle, artistic director of the Houston Metropolitan Dance Company
- Marlana Sheetz, of the band Milo Greene
- Marlana Thompson (born 1978), Akwesasne artist and fashion designer
- Kristy Marlana Wallace (born 1953), American musician known as Poison Ivy

== See also ==
- Marlena
- Marlene
