= Marlena (disambiguation) =

Marlena is a given name and surname. It may also refer to:

== Music ==
- "Marlena" (song), a song recorded and released by the Four Seasons c. 1963
- Marlena (Die Flippers album), 1977
- Marlena (Marlena Shaw album), 1972

== Other uses ==
- Marlena (restaurant), San Francisco, US
- Marlena (novel), 2017 novel by Julie Buntin

== See also ==
- Marlene (disambiguation)
- Marlen
