= Marla =

- Marla (given name), a female given name in English
- Marla faith, the traditional religion of the Mari people of the republic of Mari El, Russia
- Marla (unit), a unit of measuring land (surface) in Southern Asia approximately equal to 25 sq yards or 225 sq ft (20.9 m^{2})
- Marla, South Australia, a town and locality
  - Marla Airport

== See also ==
- Mala (disambiguation)
