= Dobkin =

Dobkin is a surname. Notable people with the surname include:

- Alix Dobkin (1940–2021), American folk singer-songwriter
- Bob Dobkin, electrical engineer
- David Dobkin (director) (born 1969), film director, producer and former screenwriter
- David P. Dobkin, the Dean of the Faculty and Phillip Y. Goldman '86 Professor of Computer Science at Princeton University
- Debra Dobkin, musician and painter
- Eliyahu Dobkin (1898–1976), leading figure of the Labor Zionism movement and signatory of the Israeli declaration of independence
- Jess Dobkin (born 1970), performance artist living and working in Toronto, Canada
- Lawrence Dobkin (1919–2002), American television director, actor and television screenwriter
- Marjorie Housepian Dobkin (1922–2013), best-selling author and Professor in English at Barnard College, Columbia University, New York
- Marlene Dobkin de Rios (1939–2012), American cultural anthropologist, medical anthropologist, and psychotherapist
- Martin Dobkin, the first mayor of the City of Mississauga, Ontario
- Mary Dobkin, advocate for children
- Mykhailo Dobkin (born 1970), Ukrainian politician
- Yosef Dobkin (1909–1977), Israeli chess master
