= Nang Lang Kham =

Burmese businesswoman and philanthropist

- နန်းလိုင်ခမ်း
- Born: 1 June 1988 (age 38); Taunggyi, Shan State, Myanmar
- Education: University of Sydney; National University of Singapore
- Occupations: Businesswoman, philanthropist
- Known for: Deputy CEO of Kanbawza Bank; Co-founder and chair of Brighter Future Myanmar Foundation
- Parent(s): Aung Ko Win; Nang Than Htwe
- Awards: State Excellent Performance Award (2015); Job Creation for Differently-abled Persons Award (2016); Woman of Excellence Award (2016); Promising Young Banker Award (2017); Social Commitment Award (2017); Eminent Business Alumni Award (2018)

Nang Lang Kham (Burmese: နန်းလိုင်ခမ်း; born 1 June 1988) is a Burmese businesswoman and philanthropist. She is a Deputy CEO of Kanbawza Bank, and the executive director of the Kanbawza Group, a major business conglomerate founded by her father, Aung Ko Win. Nang is also known for her philanthropic work as the co-founder and chair of the Brighter Future Myanmar Foundation, one of the biggest contributors to social and community development in Myanmar, which supports health, education, poverty reduction, and youth empowerment.

She was named one of the Women to Watch by Forbes Asia, and Inspiring Women of Burma, Champions for Change and Newsmakers of the Year 2016 by The Irrawaddy.

== Early life and education ==
Nang Lang Kham was born on 1 June 1988 in Taunggyi, Shan State, Myanmar to parents Aung Ko Win, a business tycoon and Nang Than Htwe. She studied basic education at Teacher Training College. At the age of 14, she moved to Singapore to study at a boarding school. She holds a Master's Degree in Management from University of Sydney and a Bachelor's Degree in Business Administration from National University of Singapore.

== Career ==
In 2008, she went to areas hit by Cyclone Nargis to support cyclone victims. Visiting the camps and meeting the people who lost their homes and families has motivated her and her sister, Nang Kham Noung, to establish the foundation of Brighter Future Myanmar (BFM), the social initiative arm of the KBZ Group.

Nang started her business career in 2011 as part of the founding team of Air KBZ, obtaining a Diploma in Airline Management from IATA in Singapore and later being appointed Executive Director of Aviation and Financial Businesses. She also created jobs at Kanbawza Bank for disabled people. She organized free medical treatment for children with cleft lips and cleft palates, and she conducted gender education for bank staff.

In 2016, she participated in the International Leaders Program, having received an invitation from the British government. In March 2016, she was an invited speaker at the Most Powerful Women Asia Summit in Hong Kong, hosted by Fortune. Nang was recognized in the annual "People of the Year (2016)" list by the Irrawaddy News Agency, highlighting her as one of the emerging leaders in the private business sector. Additionally, she was featured in the "Admirable Smart Women" series. Nang practices gender neutrality within her company. She is an advocate for gender equality. In a groundbreaking move for Kanboza Bank in 2016, she eliminated stringent job application criteria related to gender, age, and marital status, marking a significant departure from the practices upheld for 22 years since the establishment of the bank.

In 2017, Nang was promoted to Deputy CEO of the bank. She has been selected to participate in the Huawei Future Shapers Project. She became a member of the Executive Committee of Myanmar Young Entrepreneurs Association. During a donation ceremony in 2017 for the development of Rakhine State, she contributed 65,160,000 kyats through State Counsellor Aung San Suu Kyi.

== Awards ==
In 2015, Nang was awarded the "State Excellent Performance Award of the President" by the President Thein Sein.

She received the Woman of Excellence Award from the Taunggyi Association (Yangon), the Job Creation for Differently Abled Persons Award from the Ministry of Social Welfare Relief and Resettlement, and the Euromoney Achievement Award for CSR 2015 in 2016. She was also recognised by Forbes Magazine as Asia's Woman to Watch 2016.

In 2017, she was awarded the Promising Young Banker Award presented by The Asian Banker, which recognises top bankers in Asia under the age of 40. On February 7, 2017, the Shan State Government presented her with the Luhmu Htoochon (Social Commitment Award) (First Class) in honor of the 70th anniversary of Shan State Day.

In 2018, she received the Eminent Business Alumni Award 2018 from the National University of Singapore.
