= Marlena =

Marlena is a given name and a surname. Individuals with this name include:

- Atishi Marlena (born 1981), Indian politician, former chief minister of Delhi
- Marlena (wrestler), ring name of Terri Runnels
- Marlena De Lacroix, pseudonym of American journalist Connie Passalacqua Hayman
- Marlena Fejzo (born 1968), American medical scientist
- Marlena Granaszewska (born 1998), Polish sprinter
- Marlena Jansson (born 1970), Swedish orienteer
- Marlena Karwacka (born 1997), Polish racing cyclist
- Marlena Kowalik (born 1984), German-born Polish footballer
- Marlena Kruger, South African-New Zealand medical researcher and academic
- Marlena Maląg (born 1964), Polish politician
- Marlena Novak, American artist
- Marlena Rybacha (born 1987), Polish field hockey player
- Marlena Shaw (1939–2024), American singer
- Marlena Smalls, American educator and musician
- Marlena Spieler (1949–2023), American food writer
- Marlena Monika Ng Sta. Maria, Filipino fashion model
- Marlena Wesh (born 1991), Haitian-American sprinter
- Marlena Zagoni (née Predescu, born 1951), Romanian rower

== Characters ==
- Marlena Evans, a character on the soap opera Days of our Lives
- Marlena "Nana" McQueen, a character on the soap opera Hollyoaks
- Queen Marlena, the mother of He-Man and She-Ra

== See also ==
- Marlen
