= Marlen =

Marlen, feminine: Marlena (portmanteau of Marx + Lenin) is a Russian given name of Soviet origin. Notable people with the name include:

It may also be a feminine given name, a variant of Marlene, Marleen, which is a portmanteau of Maria+Magdalene.

== Western name ==
- Marlen Chow, Nicaraguan feminist and sociologist
- Marlen Esparza, American professional boxer
- Marlen Haushofer (1920–1970), Austrian writer
- Marlen Reusser, Swiss racing cyclist

== Soviet name ==
- Marlen Aimanov, Kazakh football player
- Marlen Khutsiev, Georgia-born Soviet and Russian filmmaker
- Marlen Papava, Soviet sports shooter
- Marlena Rakhlina (1925–2010) Soviet Russian and Ukrainian poet and translator
- Marlen Spindler (1931–2003), Russian painter
- Marlen Zmorka (born 1993), Ukrainian racing cyclist

== See also ==
- Trude Marlen, Austrian stage and film actress
