= Marlene =

Marlene may refer to:

== People ==
- Marlene (given name), including a list of people with the name
- Marlene (Burmese businesswoman), Nang Kham Noung (born 1991)
- Marlene (Japanese singer) (born 1960), a Filipina jazz singer active in Japan

== Film ==
- Marlene (1949 film), a French musical crime film
- Marlene (1984 film), a documentary film about Marlene Dietrich
- Marlene (2000 film), a German biopic film about Marlene Dietrich
- Marlene (2020 film), a Canadian docudrama film about Marlene and Steven Truscott

== Music ==
- "Marlene" (song), a 2010 single by Lightspeed Champion
- Marlene", a song by Kevin Coyne from his 1973 album Marjory Razorblade
- "Marlene", a song by Jackson C. Frank from Jackson C. Frank
- "Marlene", a song by Todd Rundgren from Something/Anything?

== See also ==
- "Lily Marlene" or "Lili Marleen", a 1938 German love song popular during World War II
- Marlena (disambiguation)
- Marlin, a species of fish
