= Cavaretta's =

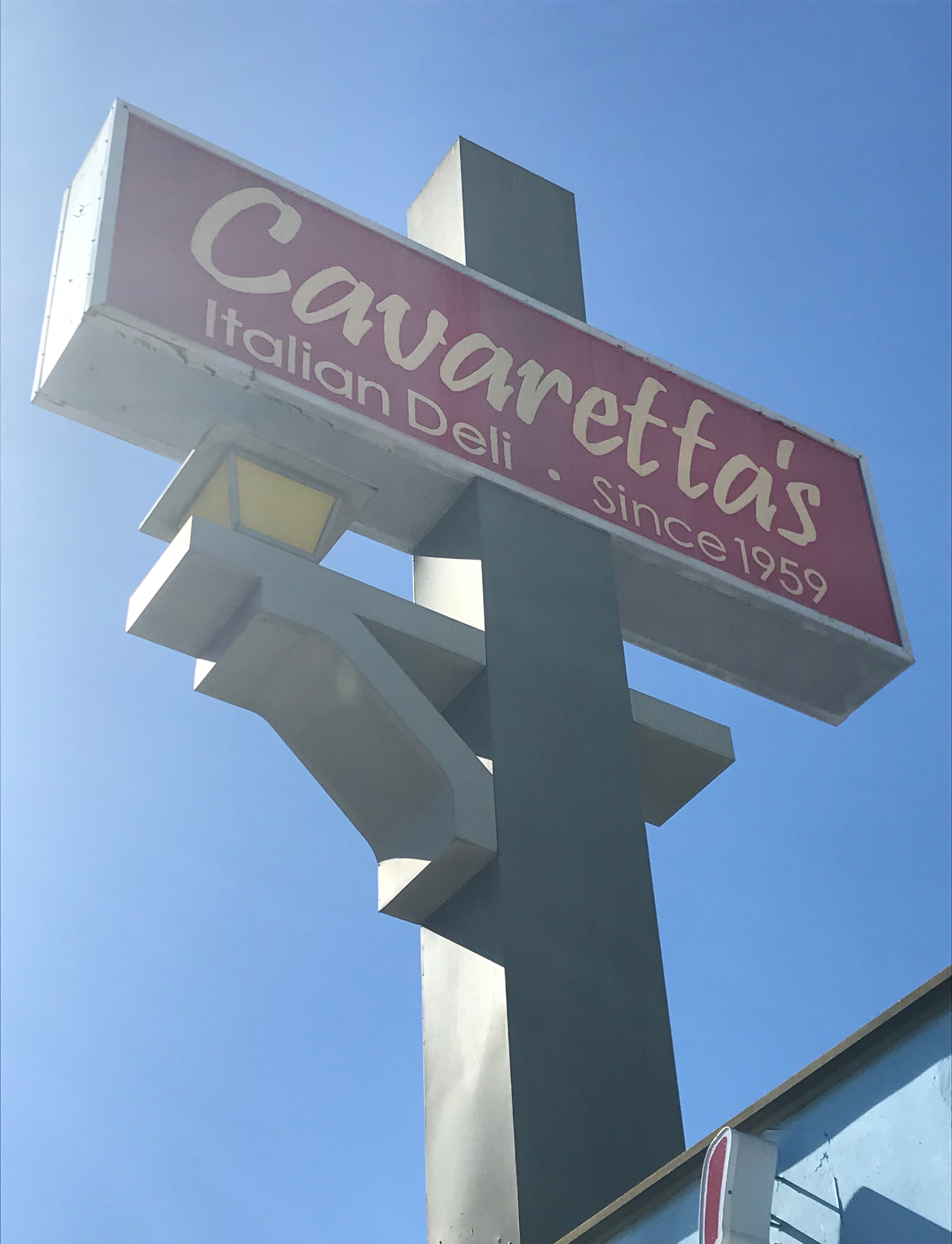

Restaurant information
- Established: 1959
- Food type: Delicatessen
- Location: 22045 Sherman Way, Canoga Park, Los Angeles, California, 91304, United States
- Website: cavarettasdeli.com

Cavaretta's is an Italian deli located at 22045 Sherman Way in Canoga Park, CA. It was founded in 1959.

== History ==
Cavaretta's was founded by Lou Cavaretta in 1959. It was sold in 1978, and two years later, sold again. Finally, in 1983, it was sold to Joe and Paul Nunneri, whose mother also took a place at the deli. In 2000, Dave Weisberg replaced Joe Nunneri, partnering with Paul.

The deli makes many foods from scratch, including lasagna, antipasto, caprese salads, and marinara, as well as cannoli from a Mrs. Nunneri recipe dating to 1953 and hand-rolled meatballs. Freshly baked rolls are also served.

== Menu ==
The Cavaretta's sandwiches come with a choice of 12 meats, such as peppered turkey, spicy salami, and four flavors of chicken. All sandwiches come with lettuce, tomato, onions, mustard, mayonnaise, Italian dressing, and cheese.

== Awards and recognition ==
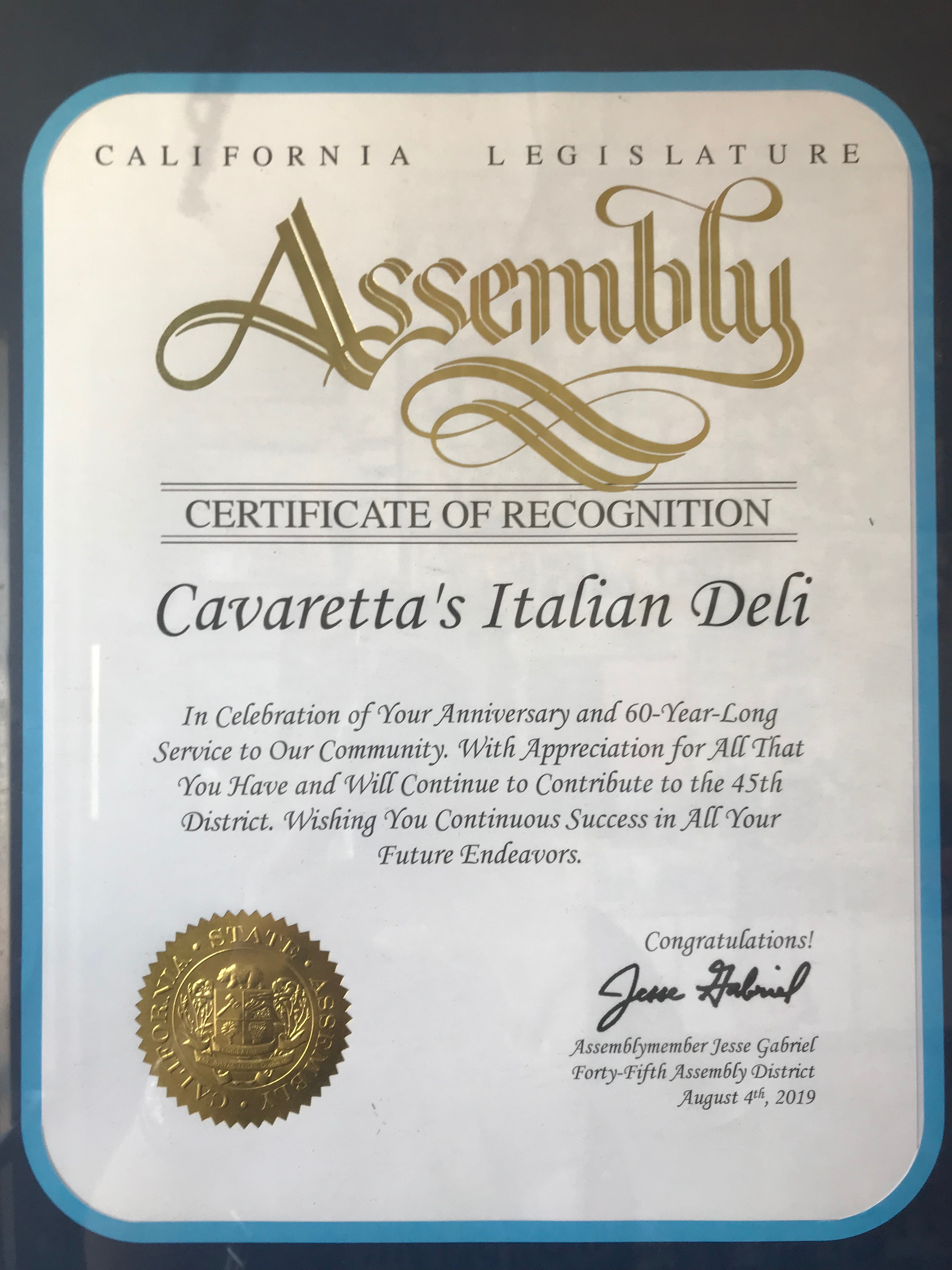

- Cavaretta's was the Daily News's Reader's Choice Best Deli in 2025.
- Cavaretta's was the Daily News's Reader's Choice Best Deli in 2021.
- In 2019, Assemblymember Jesse Gabriel recognized Cavaretta's for their 60 years of service to the community.

== Gallery ==
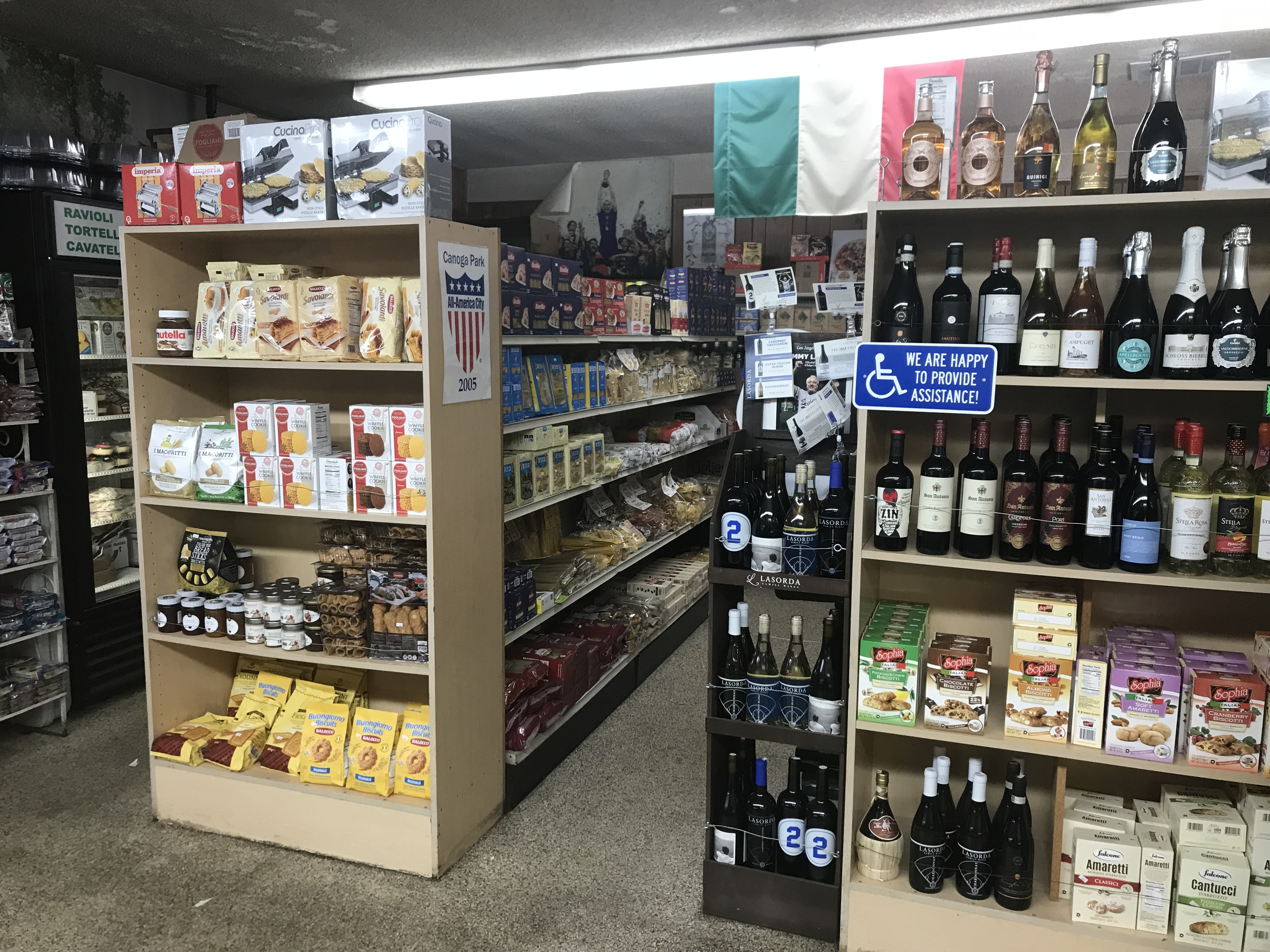

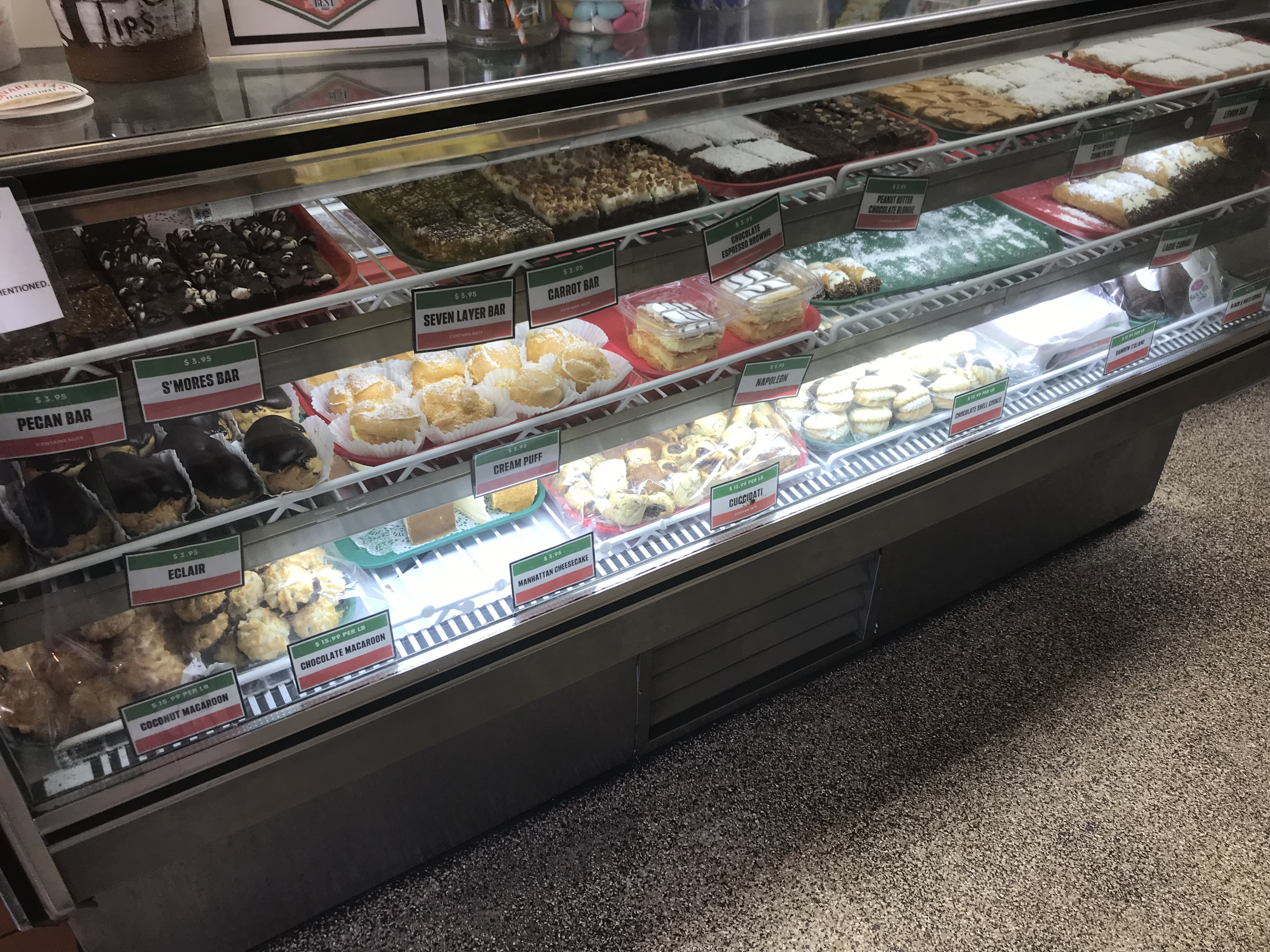

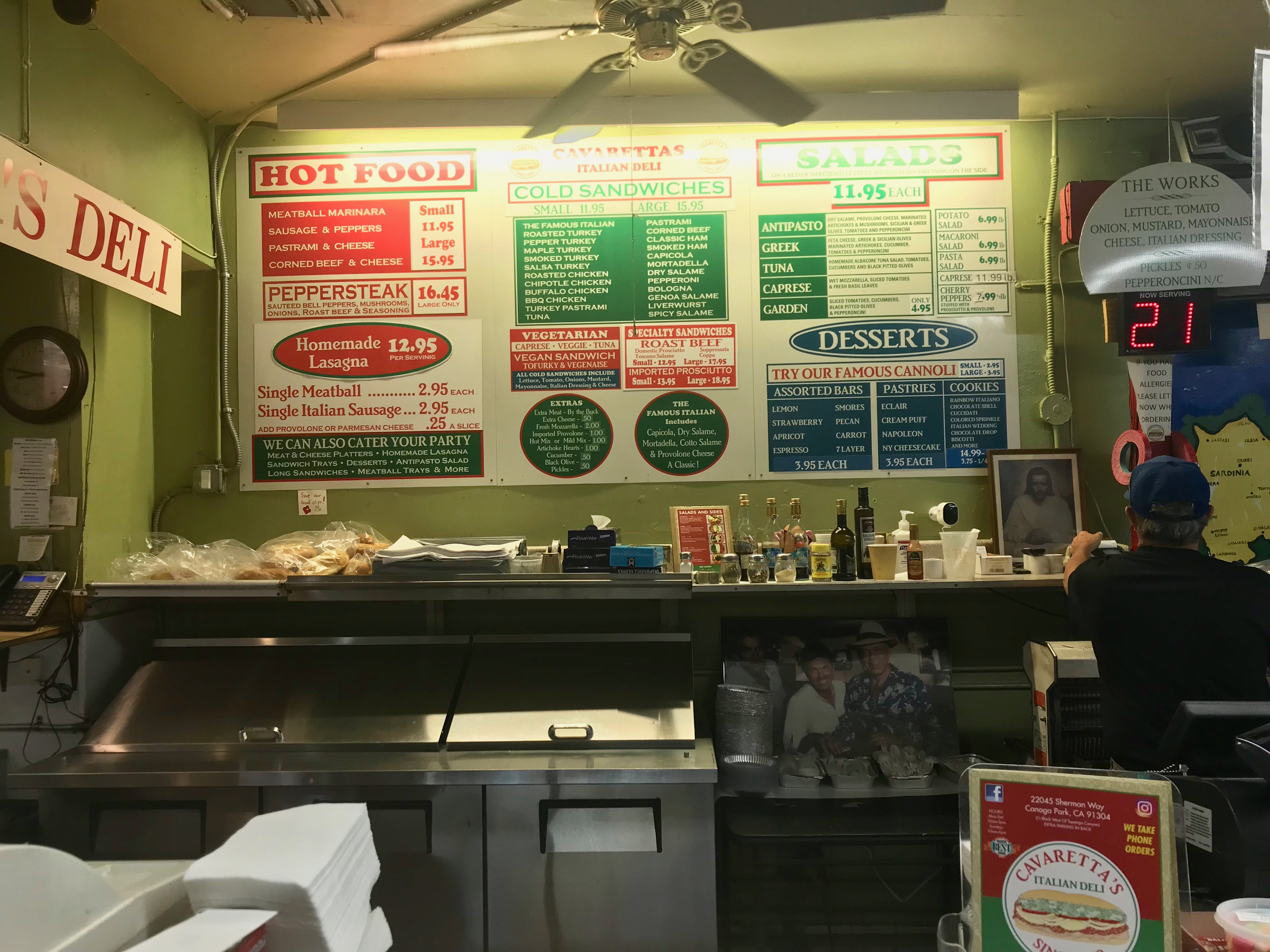

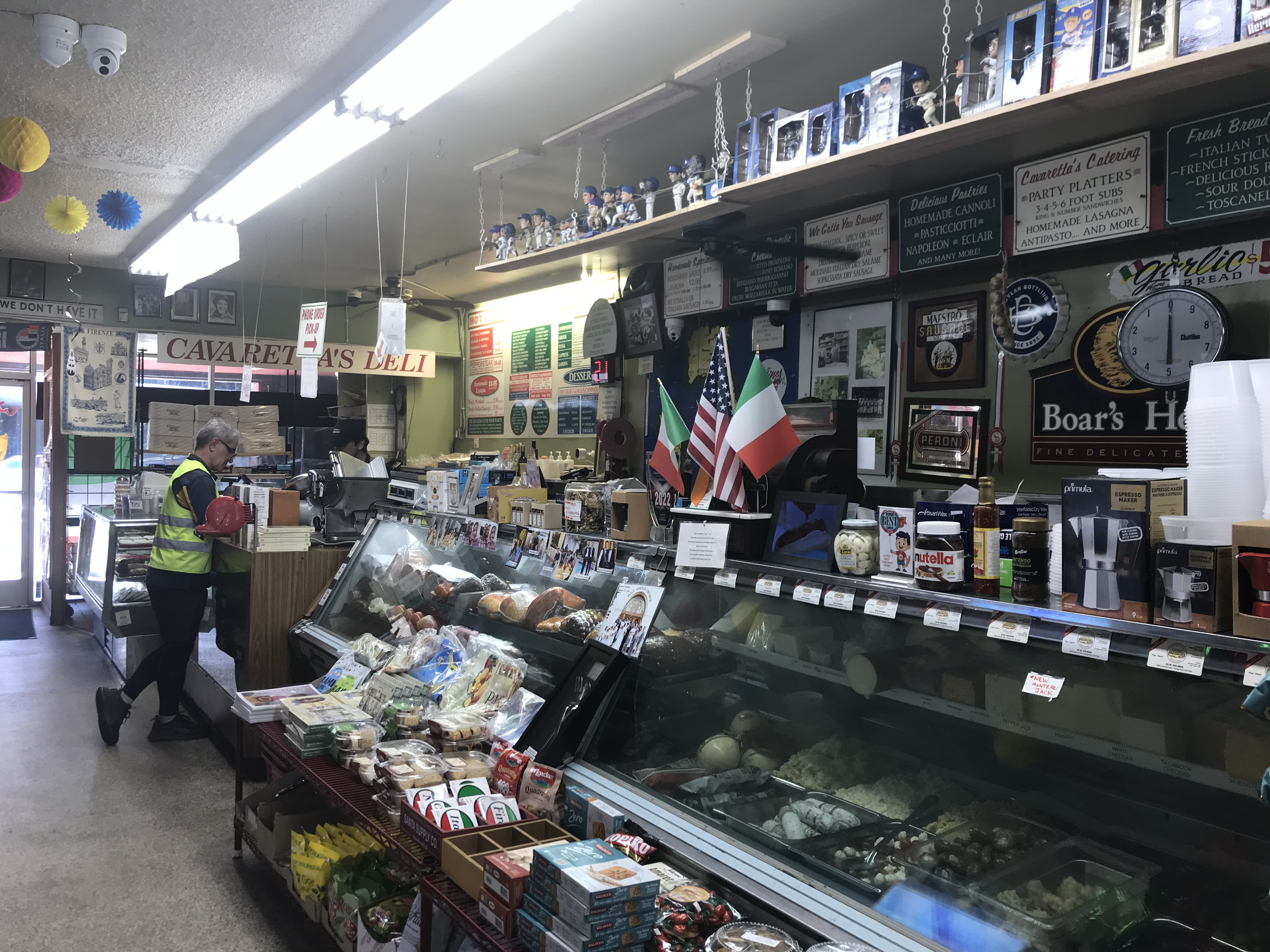

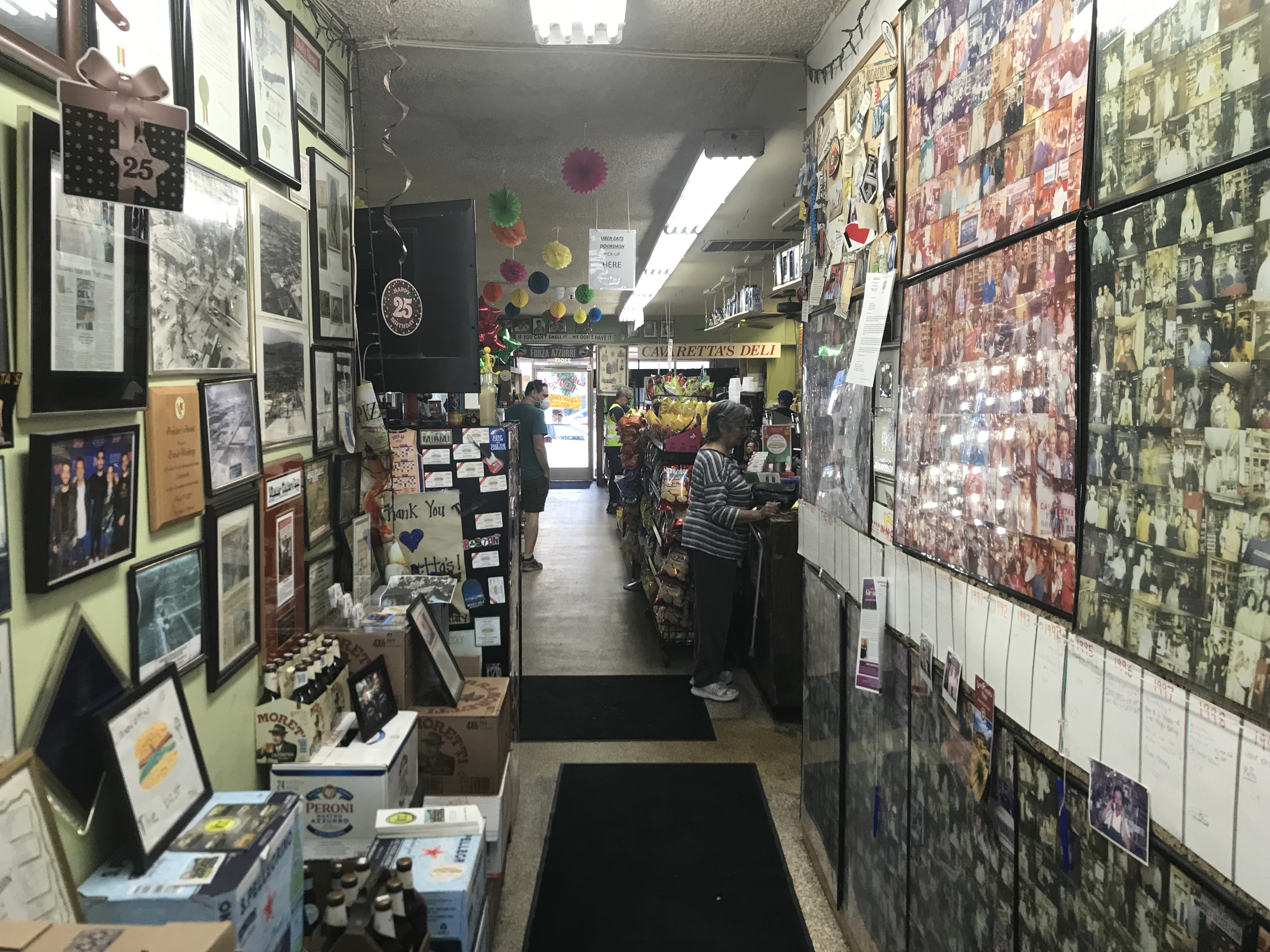
