= Sommersprossen =

Studio album by Die Flippers
- Released: 5 September 1995
- Genre: Schlager
- Length: 46:24
- Label: Ariola

Die Flippers chronology
| Sayonara (1994) | Sommersprossen (1995) | Liebe ist ... 3 (1996) |

"Sommersprossen" is also the title of a 1982 Neue Deutsche Welle song by UKW.

Sommersprossen (Freckles) is the twenty-seventh studio album released by German Schlager group Die Flippers. It was certified Gold in 2010, 15 years after its release.

== Track listing ==
1. "Sommersprossen" ("Freckles")
2. "Weit, weit von Hongkong" ("Far, Far Away From Hong Kong")
3. "In der Nacht" ("In the Night")
4. "Mit Dir geh ich durchs ganze Leben" ("I'll Go Through My Whole Life With You")
5. "Und dann hab ich geweint" ("And Then I Cried")
6. "Der letzte Bolero"
7. "Träum doch mit mir von der Insel" ("Dream Of the Island With Me")
8. "Hallo Pia tanz mit mir" ("Hello Pia Dance With Me")
9. "Liebe is mehr..." ("Love Is More...")
10. "Tango"
11. "Sommer der Erinnerung" ("Summer Of the Memory")
12. "Tanz doch mit mir in den Morgen" ("Dance With Me In the Morning")
13. "Adieu Madeleine"
14. "Wann seh'n wir uns wieder" ("When Will We See Each Other Again")

== Personnel ==
- Olaf Malolepski - guitars, lead vocals
- Bend Hengst - bass guitar, vocals
- Manfred Durban - percussion, vocals
