= Nur wer die Sehnsucht kennt (Die Flippers) =

Studio album by Die Flippers
- Released: 1986
- Genre: Schlager
- Label: Bellaphon

Die Flippers chronology
Auf rote Rosen fallen Tränen (1985)	Nur wer die Sehnsucht kennt (1986)	Aus Liebe weint man nicht (1987)

Nur wer die Sehnsucht kennt (Only Those Who Know Longing) is the fifteenth studio album released by German Schlager group Die Flippers.

The album was a huge success, being certified gold in Germany within a year. It contained the massive single "Die rote Sonne von Barbados", which made it to number one on the ZDF-Hitparade, and the title track "Heut Nacht hab' ich dich verloren" also received heavy airplay on Schlager radio.

== Track listing ==
1. "Nur wer die Sehnsucht kennt" (Only Those Who Know Longing.)
2. "Traum von Mykonos" (Dream From Mykonos)
3. "Du bist die Sonne..." (You Are the Sun...)
4. "Wenn es Früling wird in Amsterdam" (When Spring Comes in Amsterdam)
5. "Heut Nacht hab' ich dich verloren" (Tonight I've Lost You)
6. "Jeder Abscheid kann ein neur Anfang sein" (Every Departure Can Be a New Beginning)
7. "Die rote Sonne von Barbados" (The Red Sun From Barbados)
8. "Tausend mal mit dir Traeumen" (Dream With You a Thousand Times)
9. "Wann kommst du wieder" (When Are You Coming Back)
10. "Bitte bleib mir treu" (Please Stay Faithful to Me)
11. "Veronika"
12. "Adios my love"
