= Die Flippers =

German Schlager group (1964–2011)

- Origin: Knittlingen, Baden-Württemberg, Germany
- Genres: Schlager; Easy Listening
- Years active: 1964–2011
- Labels: Ariola; Dino; Bellaphon; Vogue Schallplatten
- Past members: Olaf Malolepski; Manfred Durban; Bernd Hengst; Claus Backhaus; Franz Halmich; Manfred Mössner; Manfred Hehl; Hans Springer; Martin Krauss; Roland Bausert; Albin Bucher (aka Albin Berger); Harry Authenrieth; Stevie Blake
- Website: Official website

Die Flippers (The Flippers) were a German Schlager group formed in 1964. They were one of the most successful Schlager groups of all time, and have been constantly recording and releasing new music since their self-titled debut album was released in 1970. They have released 45 albums, 5 of which have gone platinum, 24 gold. They have won 11 Goldene Stimmgabel awards (one of the biggest German music awards) in 1988, 1991, 1994, 1995, 1996, 1998, 1999, 2000, 2002, 2003 and 2004.

== Band history ==
The group was formed in 1964 in Knittlingen, Baden-Württemberg consisting of Manfred Durban, Claus Backhaus, Franz Halmich, Manfred Mössner, Manfred Hehl and Hans Springer. They called themselves the "Dancing Band," and one year later renamed themselves the "Dancing Show Band." Hans Springer was soon replaced by Bernd Hengst. In 1967 Olaf Malolepski replaced Manfred Hehl.

In 1969 the group released their first single "Weine nicht, kleine Eva" under their new name, Die Flippers. The song enjoyed great success on Schlager radio. Their second single, also from their debut album, entitled "Nur mit dir allein" was released, but did not match the success of "Weine nicht, kleine Eva". Not long after, the group released their third single, "Sha La La, I Love You" which was also a great success, and is now considered one of their trademark songs.

In the following years the group released numerous albums and quickly became arguably the biggest Schlager group of the early 1970s. In 1973, the group started working with producer Jean Frankfurter. In 1974, Claus Backhaus left the group.

Towards the end of the 1970s, the group's record sales began to drop, but the attendance for concerts remained high. In 1979 Roland Bausert left the group, and Albin Bucher (who would later become famous touring solo as Albin Berger) replaced him as the lead singer. In the same year Mick Hannes and Walter Gerke became the new production team, in an attempt to regain the success the group enjoyed in years past.

The first half of the 1980s had passed, and the group was still unable to regain the success of the early 1970s. In 1985, lead Roland Bausert rejoined the group, but 1986 he exited the group once again. A new keyboardist, Harry Authenrieth, also joined the group but left shortly after Roland Bausert's exit.

The band continued as a trio, consisting of Bernd Hengst, Olaf Malolepski and Manfred Durban. This lineup would remain the same until the bands retirement in 2011. The band teamed up with producers Heinz Rupprich and Uwe Busse for the album Auf rote Rosen fallen Tränen. One year after in 1986, the group released their fifteenth album Nur wer die Sehnsucht kennt. This played out to be their comeback album, and it was the group's first gold record. It also contained the massive hit "Die rote Sonne von Barbados". With this song, they appeared on many German television programs, including the ZDF-Hitparade. The album's title track was also a great success, and received a large amount of airplay on Schlager radio stations.

In 1988, the group went on tour for the first time. Since that year, they have been on yearly tours. Their biggest concert was at the Westfalenhalle in Dortmund, Germany before an audience of 17,000.

In 1994, the German television network ZDF aired the first Flippers special. This led to several more throughout the rest of the 1990s and the 21st century.

In 2004, they celebrated their 35th anniversary with a greatest hits compilation entitled 35 Jahre - Ein Leben für die Zärtlichkeit and the biggest tour of their career, during which they played in some of the biggest stadiums in Germany. Over the course of the tour, over 150,000 people were in attendance.

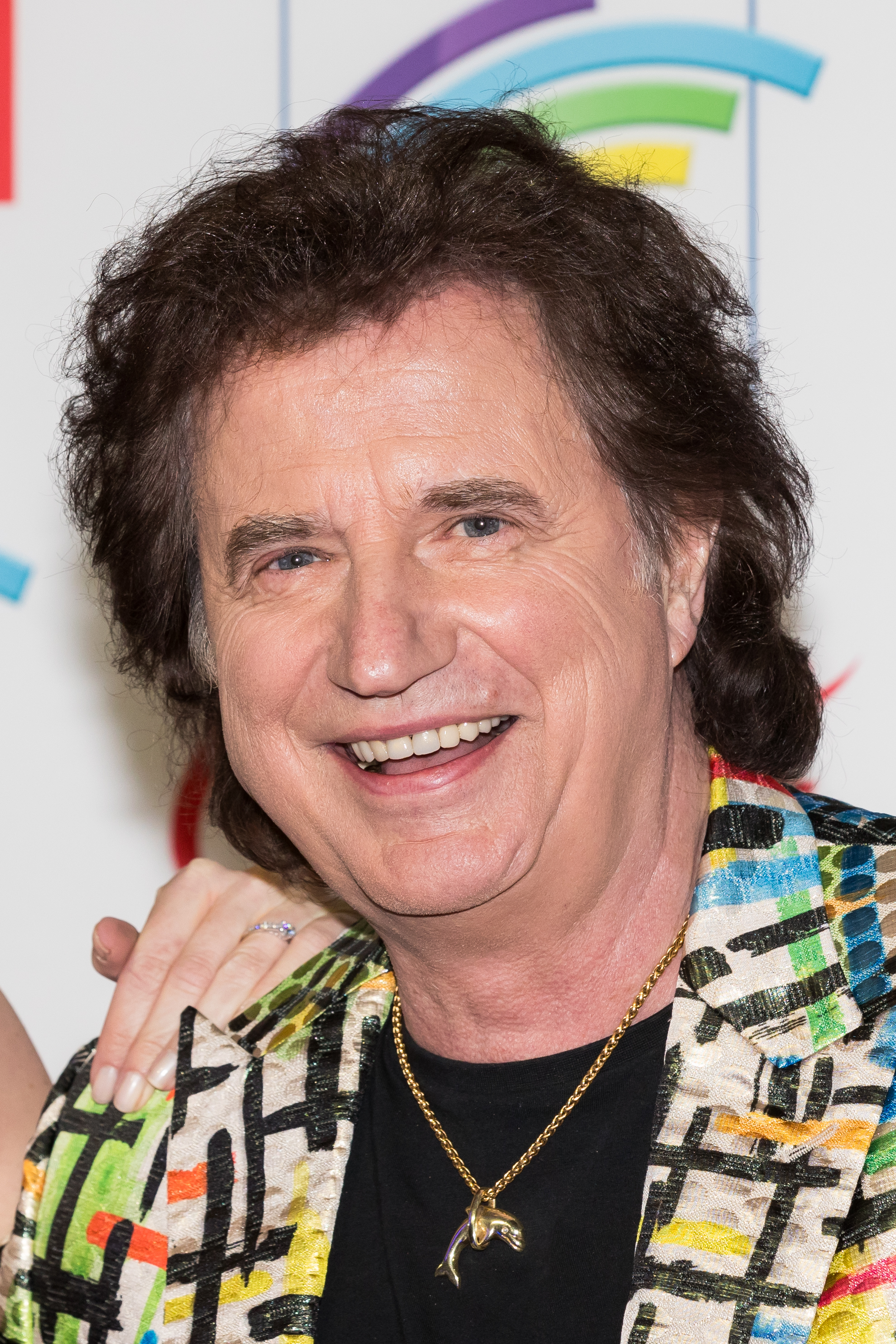
Olaf Malolepski in 2018

They performed their last concert in Manheim on 19 March 2011 and gave their final TV performance on 9 April 2011.

Founding member Manfred Durban died on 20 October 2016 at the age of 74.

The former lead singer Olaf Malolepski remains active as a solo performer under the name "Olaf der Flipper" (Olaf the Flipper). In May 2025, he reached No. 71 in the UK Single charts with the song "Drinking Wine, Feeling Fine", a collaboration with Swiss singer Vincent Gross.

== Reception ==
The Pet Shop Boys have talked in German interviews about their interest in Schlager music. They referred to Die Flippers as their favorite group from that genre and called the music "well-produced".

== Discography ==
=== Albums ===
- 1970: Die Flippers
- 1971: Alles Liebe
- 1973: Komm auf meine Insel
- 1975: Das schönste im Leben
- 1975: Die schönsten Volkslieder
- 1976: Von Herz zu Herz
- 1977: Marlena
- 1978: Kinder des Sommers
- 1978: Von Gestern bis Heute
- 1979: Heimweh nach Tahiti
- 1980: Immer nur träumen
- 1981: Wünsche fliegen übers Meer
- 1983: Ich halt zu Dir
- 1984: Ich kann den anderen in deinen Augen sehen
- 1985: Auf rote Rosen fallen Tränen
- 1986: Nur wer die Sehnsucht kennt (DE: Gold)
- 1987: Aus Liebe weint man nicht (DE: Gold)
- 1987: Träume, Liebe, Sehnsucht – Ihre größten Erfolge
- 1987: Weihnachten mit den Flippers (DE: Gold)
- 1988: Nur für dich (DE: Gold)
- 1989: Liebe ist ... (DE: Platinum)
- 1989: Lotosblume (DE: Platinum)
- 1990: Sieben Tage Sonnenschein (DE: Gold)
- 1991: Liebe ist ... 2
- 1991: Träume einer Nacht (DE: Gold)
- 1992: Liebe ist eine Rose (DE: Gold)
- 1993: Sehnsucht nach irgendwo (DE: Gold)
- 1994: Unsere Lieder (DE: Gold)
- 1994: Sayonara (DE: Gold)
- 1995: Sommersprossen (DE: Gold)
- 1996: Liebe ist ... 3
- 1996: Rote Sonne weites Land
- 1997: Ein Herz aus Schokolade (DE: Gold)
- 1998: Das Leben ist eine Wundertüte (DE: Gold)
- 1999: Das Hit auf Hit-Party-Album
- 1999: Maskenball (DE: Gold)
- 2000: Der Floh in meinem Herzen (DE: Platinum)
- 2001: Das muss doch Liebe sein (DE: Gold)
- 2002: Isabella (DE: Gold)
- 2003: Immer immer wieder (DE: Gold)
- 2004: 35 Jahre - Ein Leben für die Zärtlichkeit (DE: Gold)
- 2004: Solang in uns ein Feuer brennt (DE: Gold)
- 2005: Hundertmal (DE: Gold)
- 2006: Du bist der Oscar meines Herzens
- 2007: Kein Weg zu weit
- 2008: Ay, Ay Herr Kapitän (DE: Gold)
- 2009: Aloha He Stern der Südsee (DE: Gold)
- 2010: Es war eine wunderschöne Zeit (DE: Gold)
- 2011: Fernweh
- 2011: Best of: alle grossen Hits aus 42 Jahren

=== Videos and DVDs ===
- 1994: Unsere Lieder: Ihre größten Hiterfolge aus 25 Jahren - Die Flippers auf Mallorca
- 1996: Liebe ist...mein erster Gedanke - Die Flippers in Venedig
- 1998: Das Leben ist eine Wundertüte - Die Flippers an der Côte d'Azur
- 1999: Maskenball - Die Flippers im Tessin
- 2000: Der Floh in meinem Herzen - Die Flippers auf Inseltour in Griechenland
- 2001: Das muss doch Liebe sein - Die Flippers in Portugal
- 2002: Isabella - Die Flippers am Gardasee / Eine musikalische Zeitreise
- 2003: Immer immer wieder - Die Flippers an der Costa del Sol
- 2004: 35 Jahre Die Flippers - Unsere schönsten musikalischen Reisen
- 2005: Hundertmal - Die Flippers in Istrien

=== Singles ===
- "Weine nicht, kleine Eva" 1969
- "Sha La La, I Love You" 1970
- "Bleib mir treu" 1972
- "Komm auf meine Insel" 1973
- "Rosemarie" 1974
- "Luana" 1975
- "Kinder des Sommers" 1977
- "Isabell" 1980
- "Ein kleines Hotel bei Cuxhaven" 1982
- "Nimm den ersten Zug" 1983
- "Nein, nein, ich bin lieber frei" 1983
- "Hab' ich Dich verloren" 1984
- "Auf rote Rosen fallen Tränen" 1985
- "Die rote Sonne von Barbados" 1986
- "Nur wer die Sehnsucht kennt" 1986
- "Mexico" 1987
- "Malaika" 1987
- "Arrivederci Ciao Amor" 1988
- "St. Tropez" 1988
- "Mitternacht in Trinidad" 1988
- "Summer-Lady" 1988
- "Acapulco" 1988
- "Je t'aime heißt: Ich liebe dich" 1989
- "Sommerwind" 1989
- "Lotusblume" 1989
- "Moskau im Regen" 1989
- "Sieben Tage" 1990
- "Santa Maria Goodbye" 1990
- "Goodbye Eloisa" 1991
- "Schuld war die Sommernacht von Hawaii" 1991
- "Mona Lisa" 1991
- "Liebeskummer" 1991
- "Hasta la vista" 1992
- "Mädchen von Capri" 1992
- "Angelina" 1993
- "Wilde Orchidee" 1993
- "Sehnsucht nach irgendwo" 1993
- "Sayonara" 1994
- "Sommersprossen" 1995
- "Der letzte Bolero" 1995
- "Weit, weit von Hongkong" 1995
- "Der Löwe schläft heut' nacht" 1996
- "Mexican Lady" 1996
- "Rote Sonne, weites Land" 1996
- "Ein Herz aus Schokolade" 1997
- "Das ganze Leben ist eine Wundertüte" 1998
- "Liebe ist mehr als nur eine Nacht" 1998
- "In Vendig ist Maskenball" 1999
- "Der kleine Floh in meinem Herzen" 2000
- "Die weißen Mühlen von Rhodos" 2000
- "Bye bye Belinda" 2001
- "Isabella" 2002
- "Drei Töne am Piano" 2002
- "Immer, immer wieder" 2003
- "Wetten dass..."" 2004
- "Solang ins uns ein Feuer brennt" 2004
- "Auf deiner Mailbox sind drei Küsse von mir" 2005
- "Hundertmal" 2005
- "Du bist ein ungelöstes Rätsel" 2005
- "Wir Männer" 2005
- "Du bist der Oscar meines Herzens" 2006
- "Er war der größte Casanova" 2006
- "Kein Weg zu weit" 2007
- "Wenn ich Dich nicht haben kann" 2007
