= Liebe ist eine Rose =

Studio album by Die Flippers
- Released: October 5, 1992
- Genre: Schlager
- Length: 40:32
- Label: Dino

Die Flippers chronology
Träume einer Nacht (1991)	Liebe ist eine Rose (1992)	Sehnsucht nach irgendwo (1993)

Liebe ist eine Rose (Love Is a Rose) is the 23rd studio album released by the German Schlager group Die Flippers. It was the group's first album on Ariola Records. It was certified Gold.

== Track listing ==
1. "Hasta la vista"
2. "Denn heut schenk ich die rote Rosen" ("Because Tonight I Give You Red Roses")
3. "Im heißen Sand von Rhodos" ("In the Hot Sand From Rhodos")
4. "Schenk mir ein paar Worte" ("Give Me a Couple of Words")
5. "Ich hab heut ein Rendezvous mit deinem Herzen" ("Today I'm Having a Rendezvous With Your Heart")
6. "Zwei Herzen suchen Liebe" ("Two Hearts Looking For Love")
7. "Liebe ist eine Rose" ("Love Is a Rose")
8. "Mädchen von Capri" ("Girls From Capri")
9. "Roter Mond von El Dorado" ("Red Moon From El Dorado")
10. "Sie geht den Weg der Eisamkeit" ("She Goes Down the Path of Loneliness")
11. "Schließ die Augen" ("Close Your Eyes")
12. "Wenn in San Remo die roten Rosen blühn"
13. "Natascha"
14. "Schmetterlinge" ("Butterflies")

== Personnel ==
Olaf Malolepski - guitars, lead vocals
Bend Hengst - bass guitar, vocals
Manfred Durban - percussion, vocals
