= Ich halt zu Dir =

Studio album by Die Flippers
- Released: 1983
- Genre: Schlager
- Label: Bellaphon

Die Flippers chronology
Wünsche fliegen übers Meer (1981)	Ich halt zu Dir (1983)	Ich kann den anderen in deinen Augen sehen (1984)

Ich halt zu Dir (I Stick To You) is the twelfth studio album released by German Schlager group Die Flippers. This proved to be an unsuccessful album and the group's record sales continued to drop after the release of Ich halt zu Dir.

== Track listing ==
1. "Nein, nein, ich bin lieber frei" (No, No, I'd Rather Be Free - This song was performed a few years later by Thommy Steiner and became a minor hit)
2. "Fremdes Mädchen" (Strange Girl)
3. "Ich halt zu Dir" (I Stick To You)
4. "Schau mich an" (Look At Me)
5. "Das schwarze Pony" (The Black Pony)
6. "Bevor Du gehst" (Before You Go)
7. "Nimm den ersten Zug" (Take the First Train)
8. "Ich wird Dich im Leben nicht vergessen" (In This Life I Will Not Forget You)
9. "Laß mich doch noch einmal spüren" (Let Me Make Sense of This One More Time)
10. "Ich bin auf dem Weg zu Dir" (I'm One the Way to You)
11. "Ein Kuss zum Frühstück" (A Kiss For Breakfast)
12. "Engel vom Laggo Maggiore" (Angel From Laggo Maggiore - This song was performed a few years later by an Austrian singer called "Daniel" and became one of his most successful singles)
