= Heimweh nach Tahiti =

Studio album by Die Flippers
- Released: 1979
- Genre: Schlager
- Length: 40:41
- Label: Bellaphon

Die Flippers chronology
Von Gestern bis Heute (1979)	Heimweh nach Tahiti (1979)	Immer nur träumen (1980)

Heimweh nach Tahiti (Homesick for Tahiti) is the ninth studio album released by German Schlager group Die Flippers. This is the last of the Flippers' studio albums with singer Roland Bausert.

== Track listing ==
1. "Ich hab' Heimweh nach Tahiti" (I Am Homesick for Tahiti)
2. "Alles was Du lieben kannst" (Everything That You Can Love)
3. "Vagabund der Straße" (Tramp of the Street)
4. "Virginia"
5. "So wirst Du nie meine Braut" (You'll Never Become My Bride This Way)
6. "Bye Bye Bella Seniorita"
7. "Rock'n Roll Lady"
8. "Die Nacht als Charly Joker kam" (The Night That Charly Joker Came)
9. "Mama Mia"
10. "In Deinen Augen steht es geschrieben" (It's Written In Your Eyes)
11. "Und sie war erst siebzehn Jahr'" (And She Was Just Seventeen Years)
12. "Guitar Man"
