= Träume einer Nacht =

Studio album by Die Flippers
- Released: 1991
- Genre: Schlager
- Length: 40:32
- Label: Dino

Die Flippers chronology
| Liebe ist ... 2 (1991) | Träume einer Nacht (1991) | Liebe ist eine Rose (1992) |

Träume einer Nacht (Dreams of a Night) is the twenty-second studio album released by German Schlager group Die Flippers. The first single, "Mona Lisa", was a big success, as well as the second single, "Liebeskummer". It was the group's last album on Dino Records. It was certified Gold in 1994.

== Track listing ==
1. "Mona Lisa"
2. "Schenk mir diese Nacht" ("Give Me This Night")
3. "Ciao, ciao, Marina"
4. "Bleib heut Nacht" ("Stay Tonight")
5. "Santa Monika"
6. "Jenny weint oft" ("Jenny Cries Often")
7. "Liebeskummer" ("Lovesickness")
8. "Was wird Morgen sein" ("What Will Tomorrow Be")
9. "Sterne der Nacht" ("Stars of the Night")
10. "Laß doch deine Tränen Sein" ("Leave Your Tears Be")
11. "Meine Liebe trocknet deine Tränen" ("My Love Dries Your Tears")
12. "So wie der Wind" ("Just Like the Wind")

== Personnel ==
Olaf Malolepski - guitars, lead vocals
Bend Hengst - bass guitar, vocals
Manfred Durban - percussion, vocals
