= Sayonara (album) =

Studio album by Die Flippers
- Released: 10 October 1994
- Genre: Schlager
- Label: Ariola

Die Flippers chronology
Unsere Lieder (1994)	Sayonara (1994)	Sommersprossen (1995)

Sayonara is the twenty-sixth studio album released by German Schlager group Die Flippers. It was certified Gold.

== Track listing ==
1. "Sayonara"
2. "Wenn am Horizont..." ("When on the Horizon...")
3. "Mandolinen einer Sommernacht" ("Mandolins of a Summer Night")
4. "Ein Tag, der mit Dir beginnt" ("A Day That Begins with You")
5. "Tanz kleine Piroschka" ("Dance Little Piroschka")
6. "Das letzte Souvenir" ("The Last Souvenir")
7. "Niemand weint für immer" ("Nobody Cries Forever")
8. "Rose der Südsee" ("Rose of the South Sea")
9. "Ich bin einsam" ("I Am Alone")
10. "Insel im Wind" ("Island in the Wind")
11. "Himmelblau und Rosenrot" ("Sky Blue and Rose Red")
12. "Sommernacht am Laggo Magorie" ("Summer Night at Lago Maggorie")
13. "Ti amo Maria"
14. "Prinzessin der Nacht" ("Princess of the Night")

== Personnel ==
- Olaf Malolepski - guitars, lead vocals
- Bend Hengst - bass guitar, vocals
- Manfred Durban - percussion, vocals

== Charts ==
Chart (1994–1995)	Peak position
German Albums (Offizielle Top 100)	13
