= Lotosblume =

Studio album by Die Flippers
- Released: 1989
- Genre: Schlager
- Label: Dino

Die Flippers chronology
Liebe ist ... (1989)	Lotosblume (1989)	Sieben Tage Sonnenschein (1990)

Lotosblume ('Lotus Flower') is the nineteenth studio album released by German Schlager group Die Flippers. The album was a huge success, going platinum and peaking at number 5 on the German Billboard Charts. The title track received heavy airplay on Schlager radio.

== Track listing ==
1. "Lotosblume" ("Lotus Flower")
2. "Wenn die Wilden Kirschen blühen in Catania" ("When the Wild Flowers Bloom in Catania")
3. "Moskau im Regen" ("Moscow in the Rain")
4. "Wenn der Sommerwind..." ("When the Summer Wind...")
5. "Liebe die wie Feuer brennt" ("Love That Burns like Fire")
6. "Durch das Tal der bunten Blumen" ("Through the Valley of Colorful Flowers")
7. "Arrivederci Maria"
8. "Mit Dir will ich..." ("With You I Want to...")
9. "Mädchen mit den Traurigen Augen" ("Girl With the Sad Eyes")
10. "Jede Stunde mit Dir" ("Every Hour With You")
11. "Herzen brauchen Zärtlichkeit" ("Hearts Need Tenderness")
12. "Und in der Nacht" ("And In the Night")
