= Die schönsten Volkslieder =

Studio album by Die Flippers
- Released: 1975
- Genre: Schlager
- Label: Bellaphon

Die Flippers chronology
Das schönste im Leben (1975)	Die schönsten Volkslieder (1975)	Von Herz zu Herz (1976)

Die schönsten Volkslieder (The most beautiful Volkslieder) is the fifth studio album released by German Schlager group Die Flippers. The album is very different from any of their previous recordings, containing a folk-twist. The group released the album to show the kind of music they listened to while growing up.

== Track listing ==
1. "Ännchen von Tharau"
2. "Das Wandern ist des Müllers Lust", "Wem Gott will rechte Gunst erweisen", "Muß i denn ..."
3. "Lustig ist das Zigeunerleben"
4. "Am Brunnen vor dem Tore"
5. "Hoch auf dem gelben Wagen, ein Jäger aus Kurpfalz"
6. "Es waren zwei Königskinder"
7. "Du, du liegst mir am Herzen, Freut euch des Lebens"
8. "Hohe Tannen"
9. "Horch was kommt von draußen rein, Auf de schwäb'sche Eisenbahne, Schwarzbraun ist die Haselnuß"
10. "Sah ein Knab' ein Röslein stehen"
11. "Ich weiß nicht was soll es bedeuten"
12. "Guten Abend, gute Nacht"
