= Marla (given name) =

Female given name

Marla is a female given name in English. It is a variant of the name Marlene, which comes from Mary Magdalene, the biblical woman to whom Jesus Christ first appeared after his resurrection.

== People named Marla ==
- Marla Adams, American soap opera actress
- Marla Gibbs, American actress
- Marla Glen, American jazz singer
- Marla Hanson, American screenwriter and ex-model, attack victim
- Marla Heasley, American film and TV actress
- Marla Landi, British film actress
- Marla Lukofsky, Canadian stand-up comedian
- Marla Maples (Trump), American actress and model, married to Donald Trump from 1993 to 1997
- Marla Olmstead, American artist, considered to be a child prodigy of abstract art
- Marla Pennington, American actress
- Marla Runyan, American marathon runner, legally blind
- Marla Ruzicka, American activist and aid worker, killed by a car-bomb in Iraq
- Marla Shapiro, Canadian medical reporter
- Marla Smith, American politician
- Marla Sokoloff, American actress
- Marla Streb, professional mountain bike racer

== In fiction ==
- Marla McGivers, Star Trek: historian aboard the USS Enterprise (NCC-1701)
- Marla Singer, female character from the 1996 novel Fight Club
- Marla, Colonel Raeburn's Venusian secretary in the 1962 television series Space Patrol
- Marla Grayson, the main character in the 2020 black comedy film I Care a Lot

== See also ==
- Marla (disambiguation)
- Marlene (given name)
