= Ich kann den anderen in deinen Augen sehen =

Studio album by Die Flippers
- Released: 1984
- Genre: Schlager
- Label: Bellaphon

Die Flippers chronology
Ich halt zu Dir (1983)	Ich kann den anderen in deinen Augen sehen (1984)	Auf rote Rosen fallen Tränen (1985)

Ich kann den anderen in deinen Augen sehen (I Can See the Other One In Your Eyes) is the thirteenth studio album released by German Schlager group Die Flippers. This was the first Flippers' album that did not feature the members of the group on the album cover.

The single "Maria LaCatalania" became their most successful single for many years and was successful on some radio charts, like the SDR1 Hitparade.

The song "Monika" is very similar to "Monja" by Roland B.

The song "Der Sommer, als Jenny sich verliebte" was performed a few years later by the Austrian singer Daniel and became his most successful hit.

This is the last album released with singer/guitarist Albin Bucher.

== Track listing ==
1. "Ich kann den anderen in deinen Augen sehen" (I Can See the Other One In Your Eyes)
2. "Teufel aus Caracas" (Devil Out Of Caracas)
3. "Mit dem Wind um die Welt" (With the Wind Around the World)
4. "Monika"
5. "Schenk mir Deine Liebe" (Give Me Your Love)
6. "Angelika"
7. "Ich muss wieder lernen ohne Dich zu Leben" (I Must Learn to Live Without You, Again)
8. "Der Sommer, als Jenny sich verliebte" (The Summer That Jenny Fell in Love)
9. "Maria La Catalania"
10. "Der Wind hinter mir" (The Wind Behind Me)
11. "Sabine"
12. "Hab' ich Dich verloren"
