= Wünsche fliegen übers Meer =

Studio album by Die Flippers
- Released: 1981
- Genre: Schlager
- Label: Bellaphon

Die Flippers chronology
Immer nur träumen (1980)	Wünsche fliegen übers Meer (1981)	Ich halt zu Dir (1983)

Wünsche fliegen übers Meer (Wishes Are Flying Over the Sea) is the eleventh studio album released by German Schlager group Die Flippers. This was the first Flippers' album with new producers Mick Hannes and Walter Gerke, who helped bring a fresh new sound to the group's music. However, despite the new sound, the album brought the group almost no publicity and record sales continued to drop.

== Track listing ==
1. "Mein Herz is tätowiert... Mit Deinem Namen" (My Heart is Tattooed... With Your Name)
2. "Donna Mexicana"
3. "Liebst Du mich noch wie früher" (Do You Still Love Me Like You Used To)
4. "Mit der Raupe fahr'n" (Driving With the Caterpillar)
5. "Zwei Schritte nach vorn" (Two Steps Forward)
6. "Ich hab 'nen Bungalow in Santa Nirgendwo" (I Have a Bungalow in Santa Nowhere - This song became very popular a few years later, recorded by IBO)
7. "Jackie"
8. "Ein kleines Hotel bei Cuxhaven" (I Small Hotel Near Cuxhaven)
9. "Jenny und Tom" (Jenny and Tom)
10. "Die Zeit is reif" (The Time is Ripe)
11. "Wünsche fliegen übers Meer" (Wishes Are Flying Over the Ocean)
12. "Du, bin ich zu weit gegangen" (Hey, Did I Go Too Far?)
