= Alles Liebe =

Studio album by Die Flippers
- Released: 1971
- Genre: Schlager
- Label: Bellaphon

Die Flippers chronology
Die Flippers (1970)	Alles Liebe (1971)	Komm auf meine Insel (1973)

Alles Liebe (Everything is Love or All is Love) is the second studio album released by German Schlager group Die Flippers. The album was not as successful as the group's first album, but still did respectably well.

== Track listing ==
1. "Mona Lisa"
2. "Ich Bin So Allein" (I Am So Alone)
3. "Ein Mädchen Wie Dich Muss Man Lieben" (One Needs to Love a Girl Like You)
4. "Santa Maria"
5. "Manuela"
6. "Ich Vergesse Dich Nie" (I'll Never Forget You)
7. "Alles Liebe, Alles Gute" (Everything Love, Everything Good)
8. "Aber Dich Gibt's Nur Einmal Für Mich" (You're Only For Me Once)
9. "Meine Grosse Liebe" (My Big Love)
10. "Bleib' Doch Steh'n" (Stay Tanding)
11. "Sweet, Sweet Love"
12. "Ich Komme Wieder" (I'll Come Back)

== Personnel ==
- Roland Bausert - vocals
- Manfred Durban - drums, trumpet
- Claus Backhaus - guitar, saxophone
- Franz Halmich - organ, saxophone
- Manfred Hössner - guitar
- Manfred Hehl - bass guitar
- Hans Springer - banjo, trumpet
