= Kanbawza Group of Companies =

Companies bearing the Kanbawza brand
- Native name: ကမ္ဘောဇကုမ္ပဏီအုပ်စု
- Industry: Construction, garments, insurance, banking, oil, communications, cement, aviation and mining
- Founded: 1994
- Founder: Aung Ko Win
- Headquarters: Yangon, Myanmar
- Brands: Kanbawza Bank; KBZ Life Insurance; KBZ MS General Insurance
- Website: www.kbzgroup.com.mm

The Kanbawza Group of Companies (Burmese: ကမ္ဘောဇကုမ္ပဏီအုပ်စု; abbreviated as KBZ) is a group of Myanmar-based companies across industries such as construction, garments, insurance, banking, oil, communications, cement, aviation and mining that bear the KBZ brand.

Each company operates as a separate independent entity.

== History ==
The first KBZ ventures were founded in 1988 by U Aung Ko Win in textile trading and mining. This subsequently expanded into the finance, agriculture, aviation, manufacturing, and tourism sectors.

Aung Ko Win (also known as Saya Kyaung) is a former schoolteacher with close connections to General Maung Aye, the former second in command of the former military junta, the State Peace and Development Council (SPDC). He is married to Nan Than Htwe, the niece of Win Myint, a former SPDC official. In January 2000, Kanbawza was awarded a banking license to operate Kanbawza Bank, which was first established in Taunggyi as an independent business.

In 2017, daughters Nang Lang Kham and Nang Kham Noung stepped assumed leadership positions in Kanbawza, playing an active management role as Deputy CEOs in KBZ Bank.

== Controversy ==
In 2017, the Burmese military launched a fundraising campaign to fund "clearance operations" in northern Rakhine State, as part of the broader Rohingya conflict. In response, KBZ Group's Brighter Future Foundation donated over 3.469 billion kyats (approximately US$2.48 million) to the armed forces.

== See also ==
- Kanbawza Bank
