= Weihnachten mit den Flippers =

Studio album by Die Flippers
- Released: 1987
- Genre: Schlager
- Label: Bellaphon

Die Flippers chronology
Träume, Liebe, Sehnsucht - Ihre größten Erfolge (1987)	Weihnachten mit den Flippers (1987)	Nur für dich (1988)

Weihnachten mit den Flippers (Christmas With the Flippers) is a Christmas album released by German Schlager group Die Flippers. The album features fourteen traditional German Christmas songs. It was certified Gold in 1988.

== Track listing ==
1. "Oh du fröhliche"
2. "Alle Jahre wieder"
3. "Vom Himmel hoch da komm ich her"
4. "Kommet, ihr Hirten"
5. "Kling, Glöckchen, kling"
6. "Süßer die Glocken nie klingen"
7. "O Tannenbaum"
8. "Stille Nacht"
9. "Es ist ein Ros entsprungen"
10. "Morgen, Kinder wird's was geben"
11. "Schlittenfart" (Jingle Bell's)
12. "Aba Heidschi Bumbeidschi"
13. "Am Weinachtsbaum die Lichter brennen"
14. "Leise rieselt der Schnee"
