= Unsere Lieder =

Studio album by Die Flippers
- Released: 9 May 1994
- Genre: Schlager
- Label: Ariola

Die Flippers chronology
Sehnsucht nach irgendwo (1993)	Unsere Lieder (1994)	Sayonara (1994)

Unsere Lieder (Our Songs) is the twenty-fifth studio album released by German Schlager group Die Flippers. This was the first Flippers' album that was produced only by Uwe Busse. It was certified Gold.

== Track listing ==
1. "Ein Herz auf reisen" ("A Traveling Heart")
2. "Hab ich Dich verloren" ("Have I Lost You")
3. "Bleib mir treu ich komm wieder" ("Stay True to Me, I'm Coming Back")
4. "Mama Lucia"
5. "Ein Traum fliegt zu Dir" ("A Dream Flies to You")
6. "Wellen, Wind und Schöne Mädchen" ("Waves, Wind and Beautiful Girls")
7. "Sag einfach ich liebe Dich" ("Just Say I Love You")
8. "Lass mein Herz nie mehr weinen" ("Never Let My Heart Cry Again")
9. "Heut ist die Nacht der tausend Rosen" ("Today Is the Night of a Thousand Roses")
10. "Sommer, Sonne, Zärtlichkeit" ("Summer, Sun, Tenderness")
11. "Rosen der Liebe" ("Roses of Love")
12. "Sehnsucht nach Dir" ("Longing for You")
13. "Ich bin so allein" ("I Am So Alone")
14. "Schöne Jahre" ("Beautiful Years")

== Personnel ==
- Olaf Malolepski - guitars, lead vocals
- Bernd Hengst - bass guitar, vocals
- Manfred Durban - percussion, vocals
