= Sehnsucht nach irgendwo =

Studio album by Die Flippers
- Released: 4 October 1993
- Genre: Schlager
- Label: Ariola

Die Flippers chronology
Liebe ist eine Rose (1992)	Sehnsucht nach irgendwo (1993)	Unsere Lieder (1994)

Sehnsucht nach irgendwo (Longing For Somewhere) is the twenty-fourth studio album released by German Schlager group Die Flippers. The albums contains the hit-single "Ti amo (Das Lied der verlorenen Herzen)". It was certified Gold.

== Track listing ==
1. "Wilde Orchidee"
2. "Sehnsucht nach irgendwo" ("Longing For Somewhere")
3. "Angelo mio"
4. "Auf der Straße undere Liebe" ("On the Street of Out Love")
5. "Es ist so schön, daß du da bist" ("It's So Nice That You're Here")
6. "Ich schenk Dir mein Leben" ("I'm Giving You My Life")
7. "Angelina"
8. "Tanzen unterm Regenbogen" ("Dancing Under the Rainbow")
9. "Weine keine Tränen heut Nacht" ("Don't Cry Any Tears Tonight")
10. "Luisa"
11. "Ti amo (Das Lied der verlorenen Herzen)" ("Ti Amo [The Song of the Lost Hearts]")
12. "Wenn ich morgens auf stehe" ("When I Get Up In the Morning")
13. "Wenn es Sommer wird in Avignon" ("When Summer Comes in Avignon")
14. "Bis zum Morgen dieser Nacht" ("Until the Morning of This Night")

== Personnel ==
- Olaf Malolepski - guitars, lead vocals
- Bend Hengst - bass guitar, vocals
- Manfred Durban - percussion, vocals
