= Immer nur träumen =

Studio album by Die Flippers
- Released: 1980
- Genre: Schlager
- Length: 42:54
- Label: Bellaphon

Die Flippers chronology
Heimweh nach Tahiti (1979)	Immer nur träumen (1980)	Wünsche fliegen übers Meer (1981)

Immer nur träumen (Always Only Dreaming) is the tenth studio album released by the German Schlager group Die Flippers. This is the first studio album with the singer/guitarist Albin Bucher, who replaced Roland Bausert. Record sales started to drop after the release of this album.

== Track listing ==
1. "Denn ein Bild kann nicht Reden" (Because A Picture Cannot Talk)
2. "Mykonos"
3. "Ich glaub daß Liebe mehr ist" (I Believe That Love Is More")
4. "Daddy's kleines Mädchen" (Daddy's Little Girl)
5. "Immer nur Träumen" (Always Only Dreaming - This was a cover version of the Tremoloes' Hit "Silence Is Golden")
6. "Hey Jamaica Mama"
7. "Die Nacht der tausend Rosen" (The Night of a Thousand Roses)
8. "Isabell"
9. "Lieber arm und allein" (Rather Poor and Alone)
10. "Du, ich fang noch einmal an" (Hey, I'm Gonna Start Again)
11. "Gold in Kalifornien" (Gold in California)
12. "Weiße Lady, Goodbye" (White Lady, Goodbye)
