= Sieben Tage Sonnenschein =

Studio album by Die Flippers
- Released: 1990
- Genre: Schlager
- Label: Dino

Die Flippers chronology
Lotosblume (1989)	Sieben Tage Sonnenschein (1990)	Liebe ist ... 2 (1991)

Sieben Tage Sonnenschein (Seven Days of Sunshine) is the twentieth studio album released by German Schlager group Die Flippers. The single "Sieben Tage" was a huge success, and the album went gold in Germany.

== Track listing ==
1. "Sieben Tage" ("Seven Days")
2. "Wenn es Nacht wird" ("As It Becomes Night")
3. "Lago Maggiore"
4. "Du bist alles was ich hab" ("You Are All That I Have")
5. "Ein Sommer lang auf Mallorca" ("A Summer at Majorca")
6. "Ein Sonntag in Paris" ("A Sunday in Paris")
7. "Santa Maria Goodbye"
8. "Rote Rosen" ("Red Roses")
9. "Gib mir die Hand" ("Give Me Your Hand")
10. "Sonnenschein am Strand vom San José" ("Sunshine on the Beach of San José")
11. "Rhodos"
12. "Adios heißt auf Wiederseh'n" ("Adios Means Good-bye")
