= Auf rote Rosen fallen Tränen =

Studio album by Die Flippers
- Released: 1985
- Genre: Schlager
- Label: Bellaphon
- Producer: Uwe Busse, Karlheinz Rupprich

Die Flippers chronology
Ich kann den anderen in deinen Augen sehen (1984)	Auf rote Rosen fallen Tränen (1985)	Nur wer die Sehnsucht kennt (1986)

Auf rote Rosen fallen Tränen (Tears Fall on Red Roses) is the fourteenth studio album released by German schlager group Die Flippers.

== Track listing ==
- All arrangements by Detlef Reshöft.
1. "Auf Rote Rosen Fallen Tränen" 3:12 (Uwe Busse, Karlheinz Rupprich)
2. "Die Nacht Von Santa-Monica" 3:29 (Busse, Rupprich)
3. "Was Ist Schon Eine Nacht" 3:48 (Walter Keup, Busse, Rupprich)
4. "Der Sommer Mit Dir" 3:07 (Manfred Durban)
5. "Reise Ins Glück" 3:26 (Achim Slawik, Busse, Rupprich)
6. "Ich Geh Mit Dir Bis Zum Regenbogen" 3:41 (Slawik, Busse, Rupprich)
7. "Ein Kleines Lied Vom Sonnenschein" 3:34 (Busse, Rupprich)
8. "Silbermond Und Goldne Sterne" 3:23 (Bernd Hengst)
9. "Ich Hab Sehnsucht" 3:23 (Durban)
10. "Mit Der Liebe Leben" 3:27 (Harald Autenrieth, Olaf Malolepski)
11. "San Francisco" 3:16 (Busse, Rupprich)
12. "Sag Nicht Goodbye" 3:33 (Hengst, Authenrieth)
