= Kinder des Sommers =

Studio album by Die Flippers
- Released: 1978
- Genre: Schlager
- Label: Bellaphon

Die Flippers chronology
Marlena (1977)	Kinder des Sommers (1978)	Von Gestern bis Heute (1979)

Kinder des Sommers ("Kids of the Summer") is the eighth studio album released by German Schlager group Die Flippers. After the successful previous album, Marlena, this album was disappointing. The album sales were low, and there were no significant Schlager-radio hits coming from Kinder des Sommers.

== Track listing ==
1. "Mary Lee"
2. "Oh, oh, Christina"
3. "Du tust mir weh, wenn Du weinst" (You Hurt Me When You Cry)
4. "Rock n' Roll"
5. "Costa del amor"
6. "Schau' in den Spiegel, Du bist Schön" (Look in the Mirror, You are Beautiful)
7. "Hallo Josephine" (Hello Josephine)
8. "Angie"
9. "Gib ein Zeichen" (Give a Sign)
10. "Die Unschuld vom Lande" (The Innocence of the Land)
11. "Alle gegen einen" (All Against One)
12. "Kinder des Sommers" (Kids of the Summer)
