= Nur für dich =

Studio album by Die Flippers
- Released: 1988
- Genre: Schlager
- Label: Bellaphon

Die Flippers chronology
Weihnachten mit den Flippers (1987)	Nur für dich (1988)	Liebe ist ... (1989)

Nur für dich (Only For You) is the seventeenth studio album released by German Schlager group Die Flippers. The album brought the group their first Goldene Stimmgabel, one of the largest German music awards. It also won Gold certification in Germany. It was the group's last album on Bellaphon Records.

== Track listing ==
1. "Summer-Lady"
2. "Elisa"
3. "Solan'es Deine Liebe gibt" (As Long As Your Love Exists)
4. "Acapulco"
5. "Die schönsten Träume" (The Most Beautiful Dreams)
6. "Bella, bella Felicita"
7. "St. Tropez"
8. "Maria Angela"
9. "Wir stehen am Anfang" (We're Standing At the Beginning)
10. "Ich brauch Dich" (I Need You)
11. "Mitternacht in Trinidad" (Midnight in Trinidad)
12. "Manche Nacht geht nie vorüber" (Some Nights Never End)
