= Caprese salad =

Italian salad

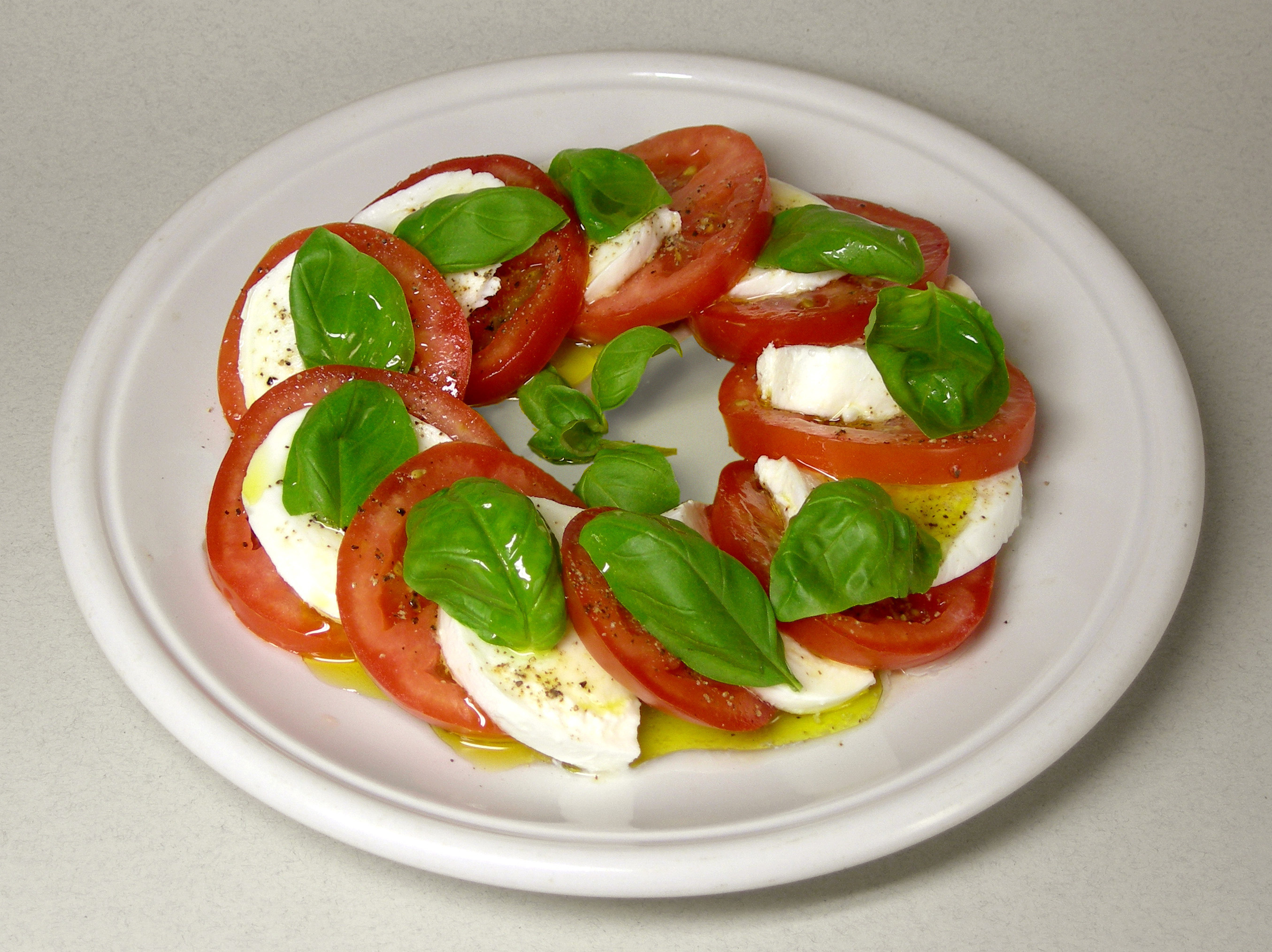
- Alternative names: Insalata caprese (in Italian)
- Place of origin: Italy
- Region or state: Capri, Campania
- Main ingredients: Mozzarella, tomatoes, basil, olive oil, balsamic vinegar

Caprese salad (Italian: insalata caprese, pronounced [insaˈlaːta kaˈpreːze; -eːse]) is an Italian salad composed of sliced fresh mozzarella, tomatoes, and basil, seasoned with salt and olive oil or balsamic vinegar. The salad's name references the island of Capri, where it is believed to have originated. The dish became known internationally in the 1950s, sometimes said to have occurred after it was served to King Farouk of Egypt while visiting the island.

In Italy, the dish is often eaten as an appetiser (antipasto), without vinegar, and sometimes with pepper and olives. The components are used as the basis for various dishes, including uncooked in sandwiches, and lightly cooked in sauces for gnocchi or ravioli. Internationally, serving differs: in the US, it is eaten as a side dish, and in Argentina, its components often fill empanadas. The salad is sometimes confused with insalata tricolore, which also contains components making up the national colours of Italy (green, white, and red), but uses any ingredient for the green element.

== History ==
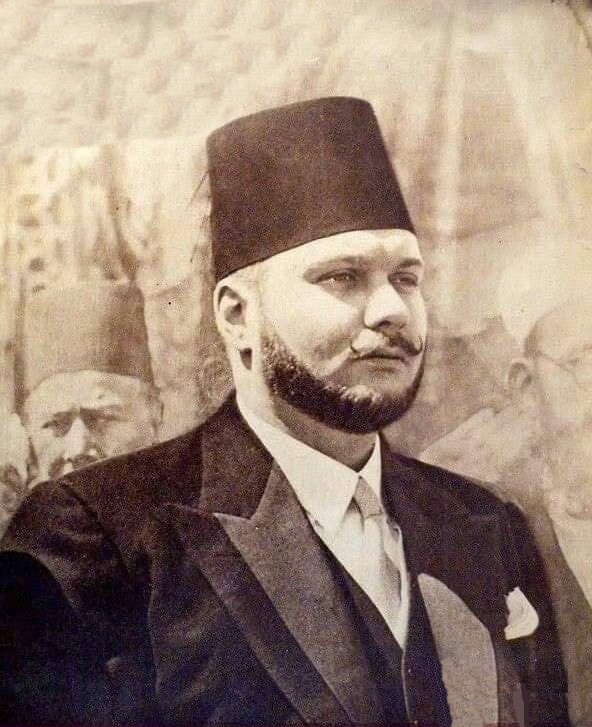
Farouk of Egypt

Caprese salad is named after the island of Capri, situated in the Bay of Naples, Campania. This is where it is believed to have originated, and as of the 1990s, locals commonly believed the salad to be at least one hundred years old. Several accounts describe the dish's creation, the oldest a legend crediting the Roman emperor Tiberius as he vacationed on the island. Others give the creation as a patriotic homage to the Italian flag, or a way to appease the palates of vacationing royalty and politicians in the 20th century. According to the Capri food writer Marino Barendson, the salad gained its name in the 1930s at the Ristorante Luigi ai Faraglioni. The Naples Chamber of Commerce dates the beginning of the dish's prominence in Capri to the 1920s when the founder of the Futurist movement Filippo Tommaso Marinetti served it over a series of dinners at the Grand Hotel Quisisana.

Over time, the method of preparation and serving Caprese salad has changed. At one point in the 20th century, preparation involved chopping, salting, and draining tomatoes, before seasoning with salt, pepper, oil, and garlic and tossing with basil and diced mozzarella. At other times, the tomato was cut in half, and a flower was formed by inserting basil and mozzarella. By the 1990s, oregano was a popular inclusion, particularly on Capri which grew a sweeter local variety, as was a domesticated arugula that was popularly described as "wild". Around this time, McDonald's throughout Italy began selling a Caprese salad.

During the 1950s, Capri was frequented by celebrities, royalty, and politicians. Kate Wickers in Italy Magazine credits the dish's international awareness to this period, after it was served to a visiting King Farouk of Egypt. This account is echoed by the Naples Chamber of Commerce, which adds that Farouk was served the salad in a roll. Some stories attribute the dish's initial movement off the island to a Capri man named Constantino Moffa, who accounts maintain served the dish while working in Switzerland as a hotel maître d'.

== Dish ==
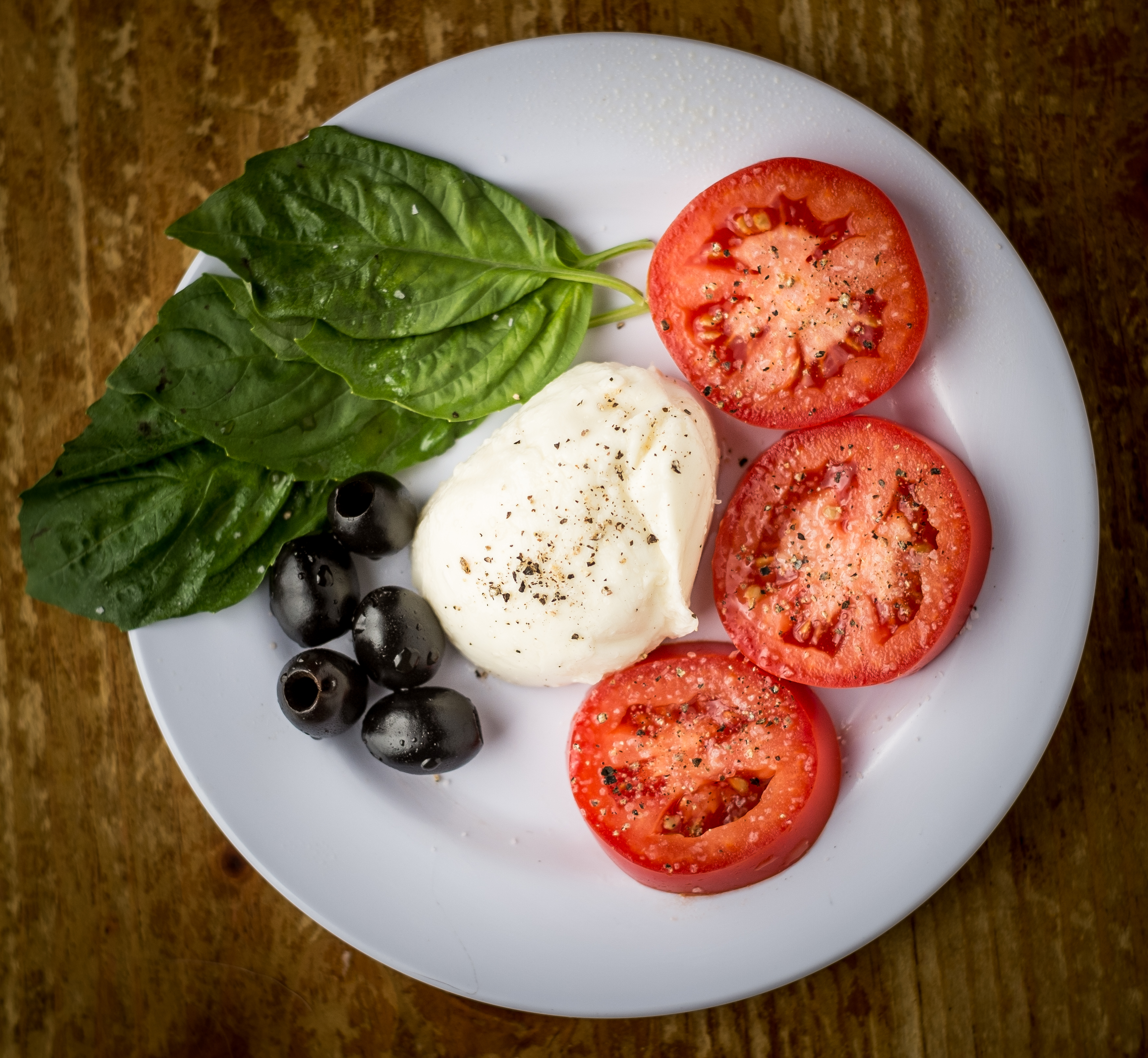
A serving of Caprese salad with the ingredients separated

A Caprese salad, at its simplest, consists of tomato and mozzarella, sliced with basil, salt and pepper, and extra virgin olive oil. At times, oregano is included, and particularly in homes, recipes may be augmented with olives, chili peppers, and garlic. Unlike in the US, preparations of Caprese salad in Italy omit vinegar based on a belief that inclusion would "destroy the delicate flavour of fresh mozzarella". The colours of the green basil, white mozzarella, and red tomato make up the national colours of Italy, sometimes causing confusion with insalata tricolore which contains mozzarella, tomato, and any green vegetable.

Large, round tomatoes of the cuore di bue variety (a type similar to the American beefsteak tomato) are the most popular in Campania for the salad; pairing basil and tomato is common in the broader Naples area. How basil is treated is beholden to popular wisdom, that dictates it should always be torn, never cut with the metal of a knife. (Note: Food scientist Harold McGee dismisses this belief, saying "as long as your knife is sharp it doesn't matter whether you cut or tear the leafs.") The type of cheese used varies across the region—in Capri and the nearby Sorrento Peninsula mozzarella made from cow's milk (fior di latte) is the most popular, while elsewhere in Campania the most common is mozzarella made from buffalo milk.

At service, a typical preparation alternates slices of tomato and mozzarella. In Italy, Caprese salad is served throughout the day, typically as an appetiser (antipasto) in the Italian meal structure, while internationally it is typically eaten as a side dish. The dish is strongly regional—eaten outside of Capri or locations as close as Rome, a Caprese salad may be "a dish of rubbery cheese, hard tomatoes, and a sprinkling of dried basil". Diners in restaurants internationally can have a similar experience; a 2008 description of the dish in the Canadian The Globe and Mail called Caprese salad "the most-often botched item on tables today". American food writer Marlena Spieler attests to this discrepancy, describing the ideal as "fresh", "delicious and local", and "a perfect, edible, portrait of life in the summer sun of the island".

== Adaptations ==
Variations

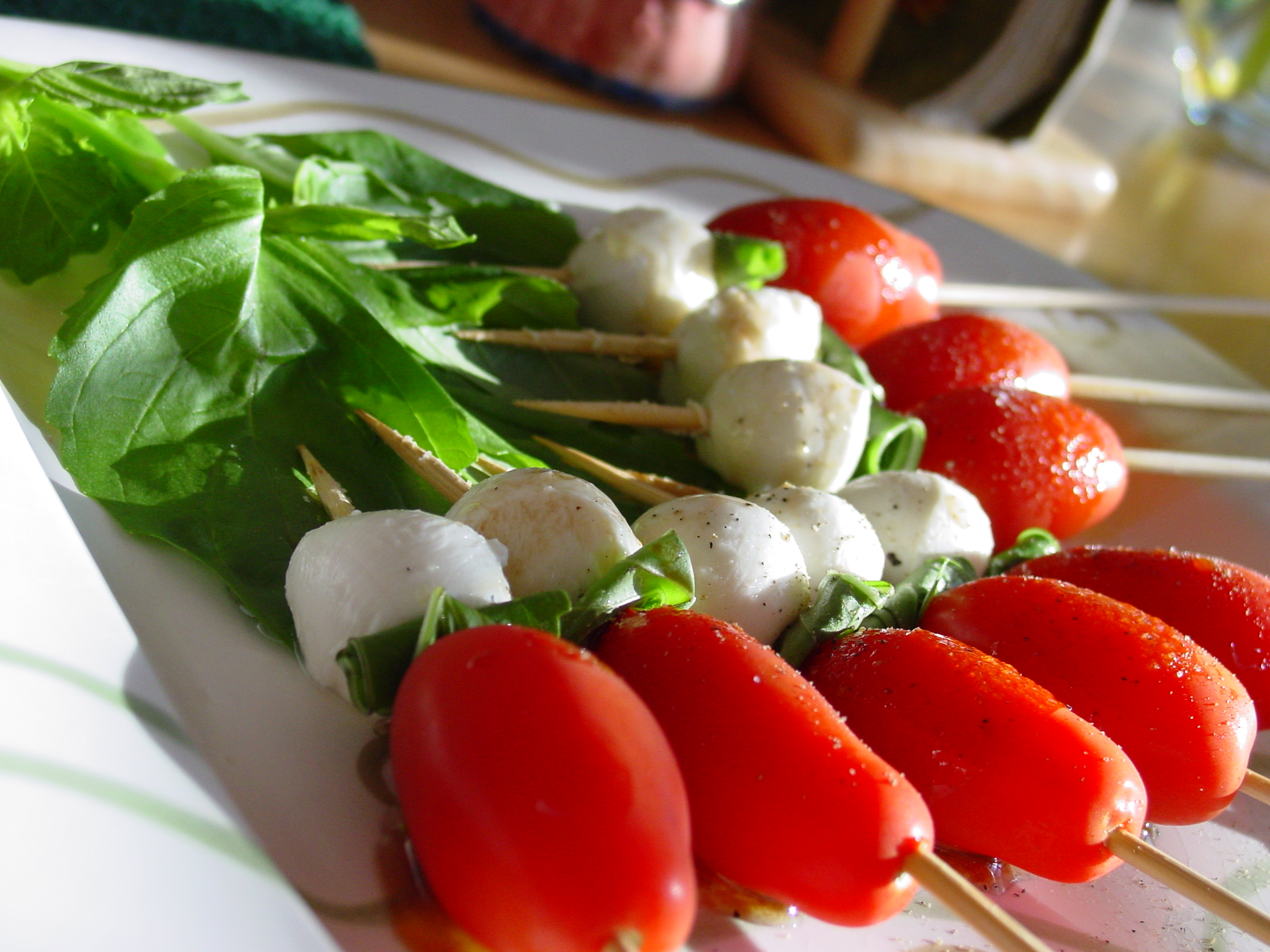
Caprese salad skewer appetisers

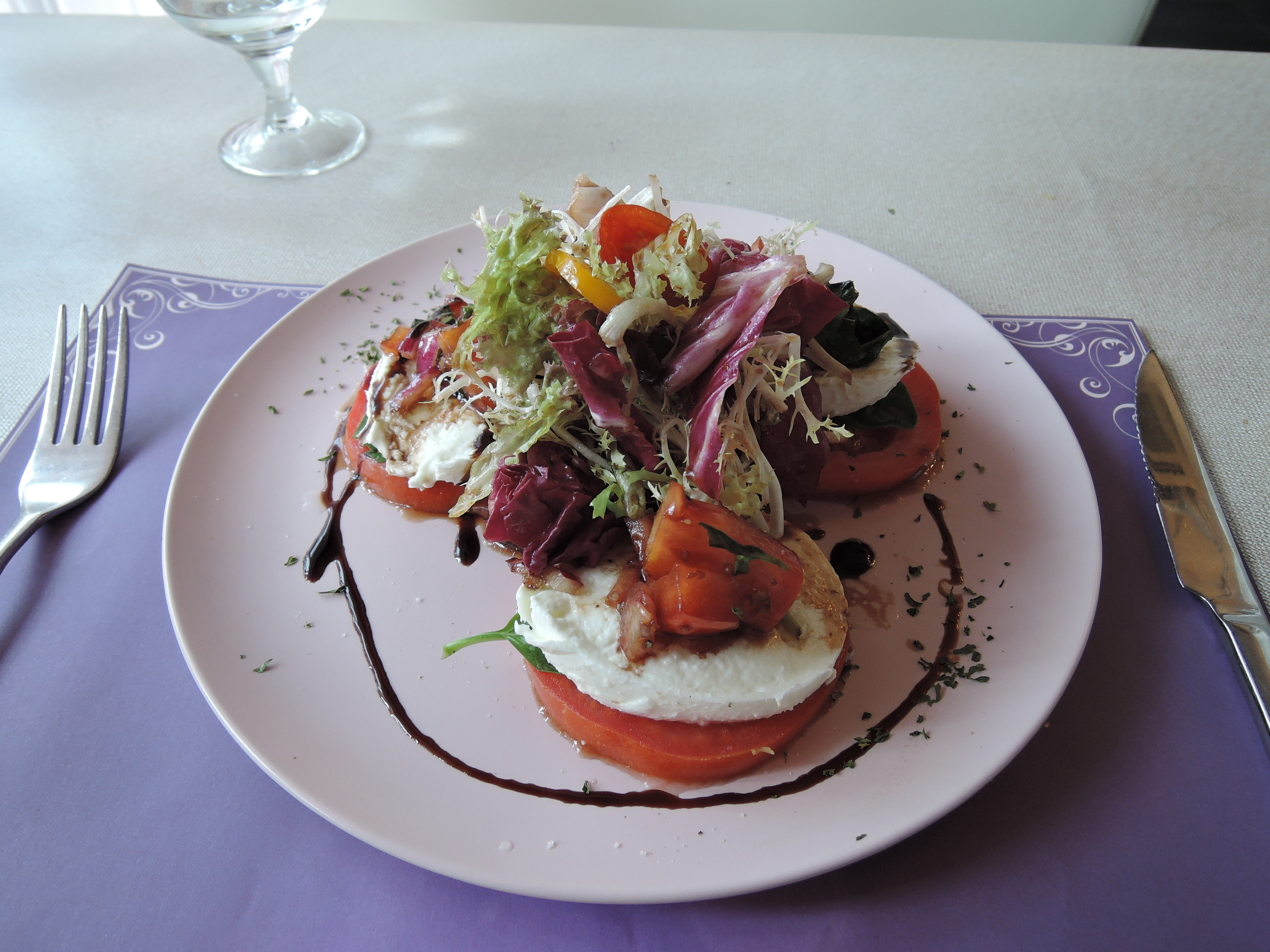
Mozzarella and tomato with vegetable salad

Caprese salad is one form of a Caprese dish; it may also be served as pizza, sandwich, or sauce for gnocchi or ravioli; there, only lightly cooked to maintain fresh flavours of the ingredients. In Argentina, Caprese salad is a typical filling of the empanada.

== See also ==
- List of salads
- List of tomato dishes
