= Aus Liebe weint man nicht =

Studio album by Die Flippers
- Released: 1987
- Genre: Schlager
- Label: Bellaphon

Die Flippers chronology
Nur wer die Sehnsucht kennt (1986)	Aus Liebe weint man nicht (1987)	Träume, Liebe, Sehnsucht - Ihre größten Erfolge (1987)

Aus Liebe weint man nicht (You Don't Cry Out of Love) is the sixteenth studio album released by German Schlager group Die Flippers. The album did not have the success of the group's previous album, but still sold well, going to gold status in Germany.

== Track listing ==
1. "Aus Liebe weint man nicht" ("You Don't Cry Out of Love")
2. "Malaika"
3. "Frag den Abendwind" ("Ask the Evening Wind")
4. "Arrivederci Ciao Amor"
5. "Vom Winde verweht" ("Blown Away By the Wind")
6. "Nie mehr allein" ("Never Alone Again")
7. "Mexico"
8. "Weiße Rosen im Sommerwind" ("White Roses in the Summer Wind")
9. "Wenn in Petersburg die weißen Rosen blühen" ("When the White Roses Bloom in Petersburg")
10. "Fliege mit mir" ("Fly With Me")
11. "Am Ende bleiben noch nur Träume" ("Yet At the End Only Dreams Remain")
12. "Sag bitte beim Abschied Auf Wiedersehen" ("Please Say Good-bye At Our Parting")
