= Marlene (given name) =

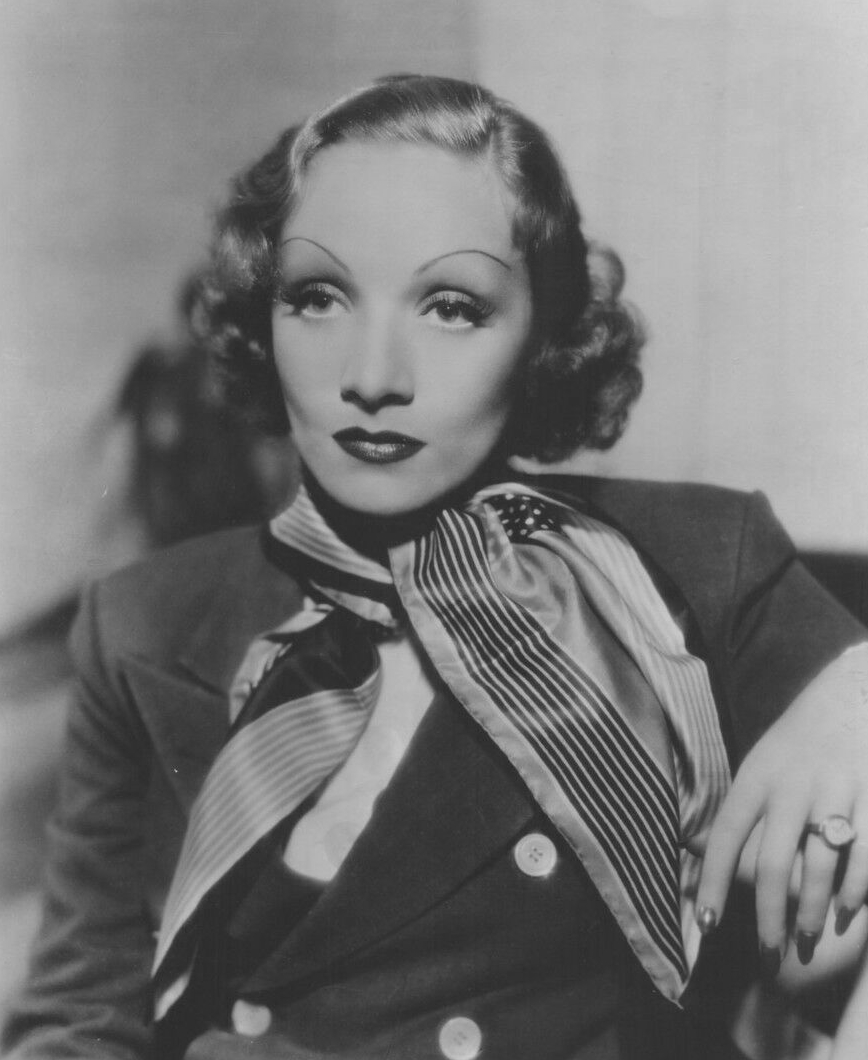
- Actress Marlene Dietrich popularized the name.
- Pronunciation: German: [maʁˈleːn(ə)] or [marˈleːn(ə)] English: /mɑːrˈliːn/
- Gender: Female

Origin
- Language: German
- Meaning: Mary Magdalene
- Region of origin: German speaking world

Other names
- Alternative spelling: Marléne
- Related names: Maria and Magdalene

Marlene is a German feminine given name. It is derived from Maria combined with Magdalene. It was popularized by actress and singer Marlene Dietrich. It also came into wider use in the 1940s due to the popular song Lili Marlene. The traditional German pronunciation is mar-LAY-nuh. The North American English pronunciation of the name is mar-LEEN. Phonetic variants include Marlena and Marleen.

== Usage ==
Marlene has been a well-used name throughout the Western world. In the United States, it was among the top 100 names for newborn girls between 1931 and 1942, was among the top 200 names between 1943 and 1959, and among the top 1,000 names between 1960 and 2012. It was a top 1,000 name for girls in France between 1933 and 2002. It ranked among the top 100 names given to girls in Austria between 1984 and 2021 and was a top 100 name for newborn girls in Germany between 2017 and 2022. It ranked among the top 1,000 names for girls in Brazil between 1930 and 2000.

== Notable people ==
=== Politics ===
- Marlene Attzs, Trinidadian senator
- Marlene Brady, American politician from Wyoming
- Marlene Catterall, Canadian Member of Parliament 1988–2005
- Marlene Cowling, Canadian Member of Parliament 1993–1997
- Marlene Gottwald (born 1985), German politician
- Marlene Graham, member of the Legislative Assembly of Alberta 1997–2004
- Marlene Jennings, Canadian Member of Parliament, 1997–2011
- Marlene Johnson, Lieutenant Governor of Minnesota 1983–1991
- Marlene Lenz, German Member of the Bundestag and Member of the European Parliament
- Marléne Lund Kopparklint, Swedish Member of Parliament 2018-present
- Marlene McDonald, Trinidadian Member of Parliament
- Marlène Zebango, Burkinabé politician

=== Academia ===
- Marlene Belfort, who helped discover self-splicing introns in bacteriophage DNA
- Marlene Dobkin de Rios (1939–2012), American cultural anthropologist, medical anthropologist, and psychotherapist
- Marlene Scardamalia, education researcher
- Marlène Zarader, French philosopher
- Marlene Zuk, evolutionary biologist

=== Sports ===
- Marlene Ahrens, Chilean athlete
- Marlène Boissonnault, (born 1997), Canadian ice hockey goaltender
- Marlene Elejarde, Cuban sprinter
- Marlene Gerson (born 1940), South African tennis player
- Marlene Hagge, American professional golfer
- Marlène Harnois (born 1986), French taekwondo practitioner
- Marlene Matthews, Australian Olympic sprinter
- Marlene Slebsager, Danish cricketer
- Marlene Streit, Canadian amateur golfer
- Marlene Thomsen, Danish badminton player
- Marlene Weingärtner (born 1980), German tennis player

=== Entertainment ===
- Marlene, Brazilian singer
- Marlene Callahan, also known as Marlene Wallace
- Marlene Charell, German entertainer
- Marlene Daudén, Filipina drama actress
- Marlene Dietrich, German actress and entertainer
- Marlene Enright, Irish singer
- Marlene Favela, Mexican actress
- Marlene Janssen, American model
- Marlène Jobert, French actress
- Marlene Morreis, Austrian actress
- Marlene Morrow, American model
- Marlene Schmidt, Miss Universe in 1961
- Marlene van Niekerk, writer
- Marlene Warfield, American actress

=== Arts ===
- Marlene Dumas, South African painter
- Marlene Neubauer-Woerner, German sculptor
- Marlene Reidel, German artist

=== Others ===
- Marlene (Burmese businesswoman), also known as Nang Kham Noung
- Marlene Garcia-Esperat, murdered journalist
- Marlene Lehnberg, also known as The Scissor Murderess

== Fictional characters ==
- Marlene (Final Fantasy VII)
- Marlene, from The Last of Us video game series
- Marlene, a Dauntless-born character in Veronica Roth's Divergent
- Marlene Alraune, of the Marvel Universe
- Marlene Griggs-Knope, from American comedy series Parks and Recreation
- Marlene Kratz, from Australian soap opera Neighbours
- Marlene Rush, from the Robotech Series
- Marlene the otter, character in the animated TV show The Penguins of Madagascar
- Marlene McFly, Marty McFly's daughter in Back to the Future II
- Marlene McKinnon, character in J.K. Rowling's Harry Potter series
- Marlene Boyce, character in Only Fools and Horses and The Green Green Grass

== See also ==
- Marleen
- Marlen
