= Liebe ist ... =

Studio album by Die Flippers
- Released: 1989
- Genre: Schlager
- Label: Dino

Die Flippers chronology
Nur für dich (1988)	Liebe ist ... (1989)	Lotosblume (1989)

Liebe ist ... (Love is ...) is the eighteenth studio album released by German Schlager group Die Flippers. The first single, "Sommerwind", was a huge success peaking at number one on the ZDF-Hitparade. The album became the group's first platinum record. This is the first Flippers' studio album that offers more than twelve songs, this one having sixteen, although not all songs were new. This was the group's first album on Dino Records, after leaving Bellaphon.

== Track listing ==
1. "Je t'aime heißt: 'Ich liebe Dich'" ("I love You")
2. "Sommerwind" ("Summer Wind")
3. "Seit es Dich gibt" ("Since There Is You")
4. "Santo Domingo"
5. "Monja"
6. "Ich glaub an Dich" ("I Believe In You")
7. "Verlorene Herzen" ("Lost Hearts")
8. "Du bist mein Leben" ("You Are My Life")
9. "Nachts am Wolgerstrand" ("Nights On Wolger Beach")
10. "Jeany ich brauch Dich" ("Jeany I Need You")
11. "Weine Nicht kleine Eva" ("Don't Cry, Little Eva")
12. "Sommernachtsträume" ("Summer Night's Dreams")
13. "Ich halt' Dich" ("I Hold You")
14. "Aber Dich gibt's nur einmal für mich" ("But You Are Only For Me Once")
15. "Wo meine Sonne scheint" ("Where My Sun Shines")
16. "Bist Du einsamm..." ("Are You Lonely...")
