= Das schönste im Leben =

Studio album by Die Flippers
- Released: 1975
- Genre: Schlager
- Label: Bellaphon

Die Flippers chronology
Komm auf meine Insel (1971)	Das schönste im Leben (1975)	Die schönsten Volkslieder (1975)

Das schönste im Leben (The Most Beautiful in Life) is the fourth studio album released by German Schlager group Die Flippers.

== Track listing ==
1. "Luana"
2. "Desiree"
3. "Schöne Carmencita"
4. "Hanni Angela"
5. "Ich muß sie wiedersehn" (I Must See Her Again)
6. "Das schönste im Leben" (The Most Beautiful in Life)
7. "Rosemarie"
8. "Dann singt die Nichtigall ihr Lied" (Then the Nightingale Sings Her Song)
9. "Ich hab' die Liebe gefunden" (I Have Found Love)
10. "California"
11. "Nie kann Ich vergessen" (I Can Never Forget)
12. "Spiel nich mit dem Feuer 2" (Don't Play With the Fire 2)
