= Nang Kham Noung =

Burmese businesswoman and philanthropist

Nang Kham Noung, preferred as Marlene (born 1991), is a Burmese businesswoman and philanthropist. She is a Deputy CEO of the country's largest financial institution Kanbawza Bank, and the executive director of the Kanbawza Group, a major business conglomerate founded by her father, Aung Ko Win. Nang is the chair of I-KBZ Insurance, and the co-founder of the Brighter Future Myanmar Foundation, one of the biggest contributors to social and community development in Myanmar, which supports health, education, poverty reduction, and youth empowerment. In 2020, she won the ASEAN Entrepreneur Award in empowering women category for her outstanding contribution to deepening financial inclusion and equality in Myanmar.

== Early life ==
Nang Kham Noung was born in 1991 to Aung Ko Win and Nang Than Htwe in Taunggyi, Shan State. She is the second daughter among three siblings. During her youth, she studied in Taunggyi and later pursued her education in Singapore, London, and Qatar.

== Career ==
In 2008, she went to areas hit by Cyclone Nargis to support cyclone victims. Visiting the camps and meeting the people that lost their homes and families has motivated her and her sister, Nang Lang Kham, to establish the foundation – Brighter Future Myanmar (BFM), the social initiative arm of the KBZ Group.

After studying in Singapore, London and Qatar, she became the fresh-faced executive director of KBZ Group at the age of 24. In 2017, she became a Deputy CEO of Kanbawza Bank. In 2018, she launched Myanmar's first bank-led mobile wallet, KBZ Pay. Forbes magazine describes her as one of the most promising young business leaders in Myanmar, commending her for successful business practices.

She was awarded the 5th ASEAN Entrepreneur Award in 2020, specifically in the empowering women category.

== Personal life ==
Marlene married Arno Willemink, the Chief Operating Officer of DHAN Co., Ltd, hailing from the Netherlands, in November 2023. Known for her modest approach, she opts for simple wedding receptions and has a philanthropic spirit, having donated over 9.18 billion kyat (equivalent to 2.7 million USD) to various charitable causes.
