= Marlen Chow =

Nicaraguan feminist and sociologist

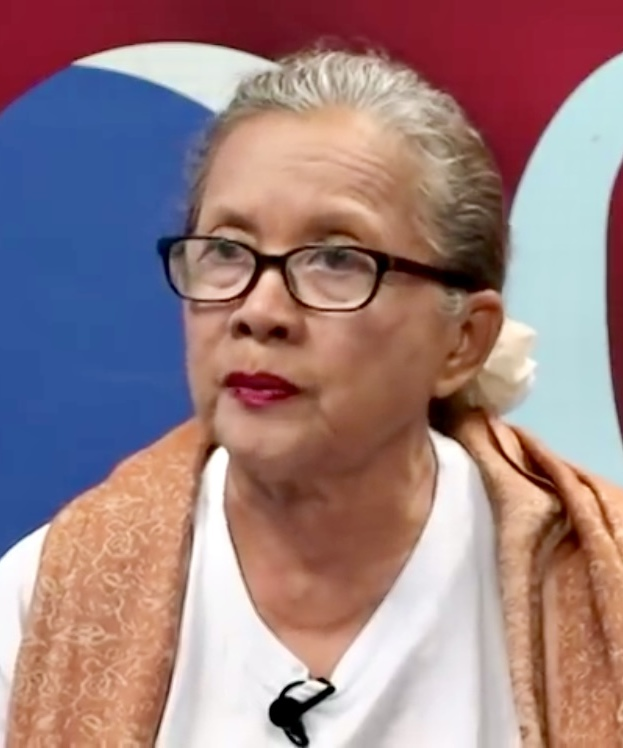
- Chow in 2018

Marlen Chow is a Nicaraguan feminist and sociologist.

== Early life and education ==
Marlen Auxiliadora Chow Cruz was born circa 1948 in Alamikamba, Prinzapolka, on the North Caribbean Coast, to a Nicaraguan mother and Chinese father. She was baptized as Egda Rosa, but the name proved difficult for her father to pronounce, so her parents changed it to Marlen as a version of Mayling. Growing up, she wanted to be a pilot or a missionary nun.

Chow attended National Autonomous University of Nicaragua at León where she studied economics and first became involved in activism, participating in advocacy for student aid.

During the Nicaraguan Revolution, she was a guerrilla fighting for the Sandinista National Liberation Front. Following the fall of the Somoza dictatorship, in the early 1980s she was director of the fine arts section of the Ministry of Culture in the FSLN government, where she emphasized a diversity of aesthetic practices, saying: “The revolutionary process doesn’t demand a unified theme. Diverse styles do exist.”

Chow has a master's degree in Public health.

== Later life ==
Chow is part of the Autonomous Women's Movement (MAM) and a critic of President Daniel Ortega. In 2008 her home was bulgarized with her computer stolen and books and papers on feminist subjects and opposition groups were disturbed, but other books and valuables like televisions and cameras were untouched, causing her to regard it as an act of intimidation.

During the Nicaraguan protests touched off in April 2018, Chow was arrested by the FSLN in October and identified herself, on impulse, as part of the “Pico Rojo”, meaning lipstick, recalling the poet Claribel Alegría, who once founded the Association of Pico Rojo Nicaraguan Women. Red lipstick became a symbol of protest with men and women alike posting photographs of themselves wearing red lipstick with the hashtag #SoyPicoRojo.
