= Marlen Spindler =

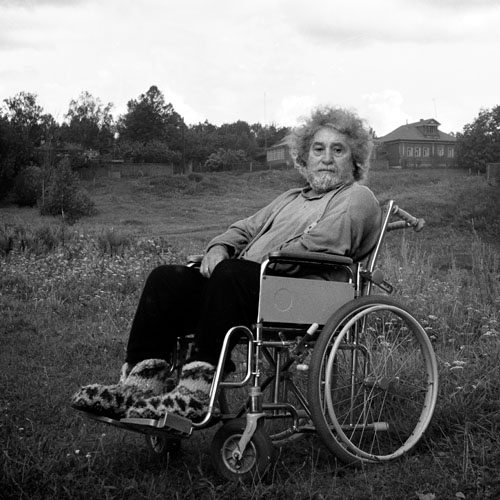
Marlen Spindler Portrait

Marlen Spindler (1931 – 2003) was a Russian painter. He was born in the Kirgiz town of Karakol. His parents named him Marlen by creating a portmanteau word from Marx and Lenin. He grew up all over Central Asia, in Samarkand, Tashkent and Alma-Ata. The family eventually moved to the Moscow suburb of Kraskovo.

Spindler refused to paint in the officially endorsed genre of socialist realism. As a result, he was dismissed from his job and sentenced to 15 years of imprisonment and exile. He continued to paint while incarcerated, despite difficult conditions, and later regained his freedom following the fall of Soviet communism. In the 1990s, he held several solo exhibitions in Moscow and later in Zurich.
