= Von Herz zu Herz =

Studio album by Die Flippers
- Released: 1976
- Genre: Schlager
- Label: Bellaphon

Die Flippers chronology
Die schönsten Volkslieder (1975)	Von Herz zu Herz (1976)	Marlena (1977)

Von Herz zu Herz ("From Heart to Heart") is the sixth studio album released by German Schlager group Die Flippers. This album won over many new fans and was their most successful since their first album in 1970. The group also returned to their trade mark sound with this album, after releasing a folk album a year before.

== Track listing ==
1. "Wenn weiße Wolken heimwärz zieh'n" (When White Clouds Go Home)
2. "Hey Mary Brown"
3. "Madonna der einsamen Herzen" (The Madonna of the Lonely Hearts)
4. "Das Leben ist doch viel zu schön" (Life Is Just Too Beautiful)
5. "Es ist nur eine Nacht deines Lebens" (It's Only One Night of Your Life)
6. "Du gehst an mir vorbei" (You Passed Me By)
7. "Zwei Schatten am Fenster" (Two Shadows at the Window)
8. "Nur von einem sollst du Träumen" (You Should Only Dream of One)
9. "Rote Rosen in blauer Nacht" (Red Roses in Blue Night)
10. "Ohne dich bin ich verloren" (Without You I am Lost)
11. "Hey wenn die Sonne scheint" (Hey When the Sun Shines)
12. "Mary Madonna"
