= Marleen =

Marleen is a Dutch-language feminine given name. It can be a contraction of Maria and either Magdalena or Helena. People bearing the name include:

- Marleen Barth (born 1964), Dutch politician
- Marleen S. Barr (born 1953), American academic and author
- Marleen Clemminck (born 1958), Belgian racing cyclist
- Marleen Daniels (born 1958), Belgian photographer
- Marleen Gorris (born 1948), Dutch writer and director
- Marleen van Iersel (born 1988), Dutch beach volleyball player
- Marleen Kuppens (born 1959), Belgian sprint canoer
- Marleen de Pater-van der Meer (1950–2015), Dutch politician
- Marleen Renders (born 1968), Belgian long-distance runner
- Marleen van Rij (born 1950), Dutch rower
- Marleen Temmerman (born 1953), Belgian politician
- Marleen Vanderpoorten (born 1954), Belgian/Flemish politician
- Marleen Veldhuis (born 1979), Dutch swimmer
- Marleen Wissink (born 1969), Dutch football goalkeeper

== See also ==
- "Marleen" (Australian Playhouse), A 1966 Australian TV play
- "Lili Marleen", a German song
- Marlene (given name)
