= Aung Ko Win =

Burmese businessman

Thray Sithu Aung Ko Win (A Win Lay)
- အောင်ကိုဝင်း
- Born: Burma
- Education: Mandalay University
- Occupation: Businessman
- Spouse: Nang Than Htwe
- Children: Nang Lang Kham; Nang Kham Noung; Nang Mo Hom
- Awards: The Banker Awards (2013); State Excellence Award (2013, 2014, 2015); The Legacy Award (2017)

Tharay Sithu Aung Ko Win (Burmese: အောင်ကိုဝင်း) is a Burmese business tycoon and former school teacher. He owns interests in several businesses in Myanmar under the Kanbawza (KBZ) brand in the finance, agriculture, aviation, manufacturing and tourism sectors.

== Career ==
Aung Ko Win was a teacher, then he switched to tutoring before going into trading and mining. He has benefited from close connections to General Maung Aye, the second in command of the former military junta, the State Peace and Development Council (SPDC). While Maung Aye was a commander in jade-mining region of Shan State, Maung Aye offered Aung Ko Win jade and gem mining concessions.

His trading and mining business prospered, and two years later, he bought the banking operation. Then, he moved KBZ and his family to Yangon in the late 1990s, when there were only 4 branches. Now there are 485, and KBZ expects to reach 500 by the end of 2017.

== Personal life ==
He is married to Nang Than Htwe, the niece of Win Myint, a former State Peace and Development Council official. He has 3 daughters. His wife is Deputy Chairman of KBZ, while his daughters serve as directors within the company. Two daughters are Deputy CEOs of KBZ Bank. His brother-in-law, Major-General Zaw Myint Naing was appointed vice-governor of the Central Bank of Myanmar in August 2022.

== Awards and honours ==
=== Awards ===
In 2015, Aung Ko Win accepted "The Banker of the Year Award" in Asia 2015 award at a ceremony held at the London Stock Exchange on 3 December.

In 2017, he was awarded with the ASEAN's "The Legacy Award" conferred on him by the ASEAN Business Advisory Council-ABAC on 6 September in Manila, Philippines.
