= Kanbawza Bank =

Private commercial bank in Myanmar

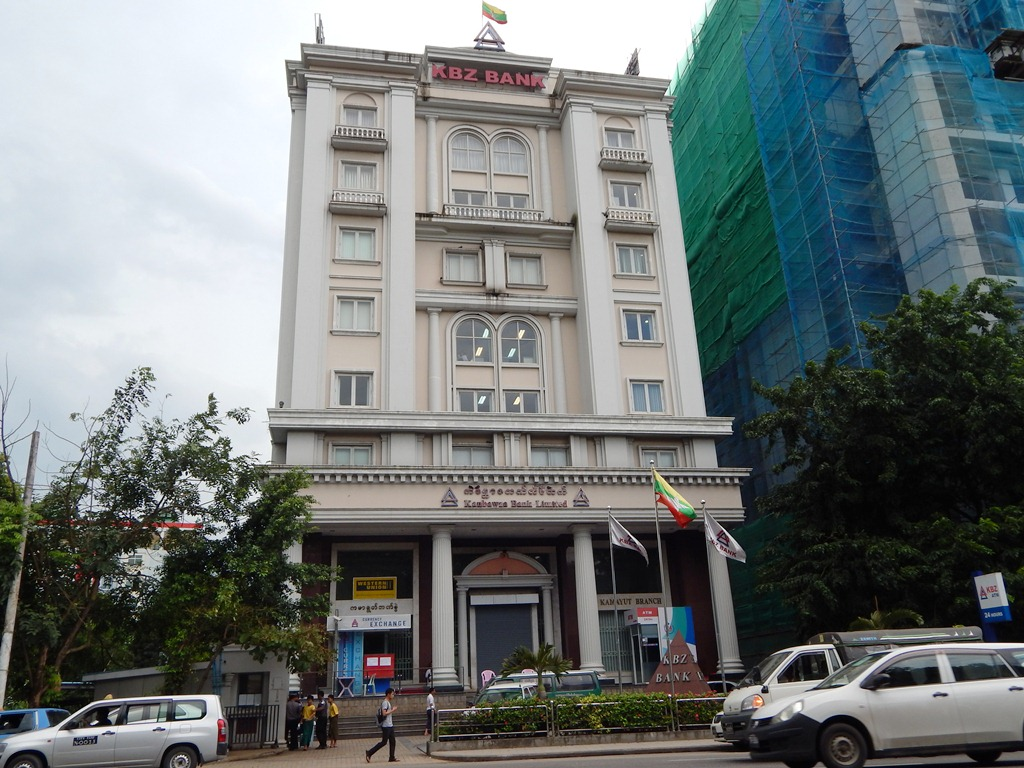
- Company type: Private
- Industry: Banking
- Founded: 1994; 32 years ago
- Headquarters: Yangon, Myanmar
- Key people: Aung Ko Win (Chairman Emeritus) Zaw Lin Aung (CEO)
- Products: Financial services
- Number of employees: Over 18,000
- Website: www.kbzbank.com

Kanbawza Bank (Burmese: ကမ္ဘောဇဘဏ်; Burmese pronunciation: [kàɴbɔ́za̰ bàɴ]; abbreviated as KBZ Bank) is a private commercial bank in Myanmar. The bank was established on 1 July 1994 in Taunggyi, Shan State. KBZ Bank shares the same brand as a number of companies in Myanmar but is separate and independent of those companies. Kanbawza Group is a brand founded by Aung Ko Win to share the KBZ name across industries.

== History ==
=== Launch of KBZPay ===
In October 2018, KBZ Bank launched KBZPay, a mobile wallet platform that allows individuals, merchants and businesses access to the financial system and Myanmar's emerging digital economy. Aside from storing money, KBZPay app allows customers to make cashless transactions, send and receive money, and withdraw cash through authorised agents, merchants and ATMs, at zero to low cost, without a card, across the country.

Most recently, the platform was boosted by the introduction of shopper and personal loans, digital life insurance, and a donation function, which allows people to donate to charities within a single platform. The app, which is available for download across the country, has been downloaded 6 million times by August 2020, with more than US$9 billion in transactions facilitated.

=== COVID-19 relief contributions ===
In March 2020, KBZ Bank donated nearly US$1 million to Myanmar's health ministry to combat COVID-19. The bank also donated 600,000 surgical masks and 3,000 other sets of PPE. The bank increased the supply of bank notes by tenfold in all of its 500 branches and 2,200 ATMs, while also doubling withdrawal limits for its customers. To ease the financial impact of COVID-19 on businesses and households, financial relief programs were also established, including rescheduling repayments for mortgages, reducing interest rates on loans in-line with Central Bank recommendations and tailoring loans for specific groups, such as rural farmers.

=== 2021 protests ===
In the aftermath of the 2021 Myanmar coup d'état, civil resistance efforts emerged in the country. On 8 February, Kanbawza Bank temporarily closed its branches due to staff shortages resulting from KBZ staff participating in the civil disobedience campaign.
