= Marlena Spieler =

American food writer (1949–2023)

- Born: April 16, 1949; Sacramento, California, U.S.
- Died: July 6, 2023 (aged 74); England
- Occupations: Food writer; Broadcaster
- Website: marlenaspieler.com

Marlena Spieler (April 16, 1949 – July 6, 2023) was an American food writer of more than 70 cookbooks. She contributed to Bon Appétit, Saveur, and the San Francisco Chronicle food column "The Roving Feast."

== Early life ==
Spieler was born in Sacramento, California. As a student, she started drawing recipes while she attended an art school. Her life interest was focused on cooking, tasting, and sharing stories about food.

== Career ==
Spieler's publications were based on cooking, eating and sharing. As a food writer, she was the Roving Feast columnist for The San Francisco Chronicle. She also worked for radio and television shows. She wrote over 70 cookbooks. Spieler's book, "The Classic Barbecue and Grill Cookbook was a #1 best-seller in the United Kingdom. After writing "Yummy Potatoes," she was invited as an ambassador to the 2008 UN Year of Potato conference in Peru.

== Personal life and death ==
Marlena Spieler resided in the United Kingdom with her husband Alan until her death. She died at her home outside of London on July 6, 2023, at the age of 74.

== Awards and recognitions ==
Spieler received the James Beard for two books and one newspaper column, the Guild of Food Writers Awards twice (UK best radio food broadcaster of the year), and the Association of Food Journalists (USA:Best Column in Newspaper of Over 400,000 circulation) twice, for radio presenting and publications. Her book "Feeding Friends" won the International Cookbook Award in Perigueux, France in 2000, and the "Jewish Heritage Cooking" book was honored in the Loire Valley in 2003, by a Special Jury Award at World Gourmand Book Awards.

== Selected publications ==
1. 1997 The Vegetarian Bistro: 250 Authentic French Regional Recipes
2. 2002 Williams-Sonoma Collection: Vegetable
3. 2002 The Jewish Heritage Cookbook
4. 2003 Classic Home Cooking by Marlena Spieler, Mary Frances Berry
5. 2004 Jewish Cooking
6. 2004 Grilled Cheese: 50 Recipes to Make You Melt by Marlena Spieler, Sheri Giblin
7. 2005 Macaroni & Cheese by Marlena Spieler, Noel Barnhurst
8. 2006 The Complete Guide to Traditional Jewish Cooking
9. 2007 Yummy Potatoes: 65 Downright Delicious Recipes by Marlena Spieler, Sheri Giblin (Photographs)
10. 2008 Mexico by Marlena Spieler, Marita Adair (Contributor), Nick Rider
