= Marlena (Die Flippers album) =

Studio album by Die Flippers
- Released: 1977
- Genre: Schlager
- Label: Bellaphon

Die Flippers chronology
Von Herz zu Herz (1976)	Marlena (1977)	Kinder des Sommers (1978)

Marlena is the seventh studio album released by German Schlager group Die Flippers. The group's album sales continued to rise with the release of this album. It was one of their most successful albums of the 1970s.

== Track listing ==
1. "Surf Baby Surf"
2. "Isabell"
3. "Gina"
4. "Kleina Sonja" (Little Sonja)
5. "Freunde" (Friends)
6. "Carry Ann"
7. "Marlena"
8. "Nur ein Bild von Dir" (Just a Picture of You)
9. "Die Liebe ist wie ein Garten" (Love Is Like a Garden)
10. "Südamerika" (South America)
11. "Rosalle"
12. "Weine nicht um Tommy" (Don't Cry Over Tommy)
