= Marlene Dobkin de Rios =

American anthropologist and psychotherapist

Marlene Dobkin de Rios FRAI
- Dobkin de Rios in 2002
- Born: April 12, 1939; The Bronx, New York City, U.S.
- Died: November 10, 2012 (aged 73); Placentia, California, U.S.
- Occupations: Cultural anthropologist, medical anthropologist, psychotherapist
- Children: 2

Academic background
- Education: Queens College, City University of New York; New York University; University of California, Riverside

Academic work
- Institutions: California State University, Fullerton, University of California, Irvine

Marlene Dobkin de Rios FRAI (April 12, 1939 – November 10, 2012) was an American cultural anthropologist, medical anthropologist, and psychotherapist. She conducted fieldwork in the Amazon for almost 30 years. Her research included the use of entheogenic plants by the indigenous peoples of Peru.

== Early life and education ==
Dobkin de Rios was born in 1939 in The Bronx into a Ukrainian Jewish family. She was the daughter of Bernard Dobkin, a salesman from Kyiv, and Anne (née Schwartz), a bookkeeper whose parents emigrated from Galicia. Her family were Russian Jews.

Dobkin de Rios completed a bachelor's degree in clinical psychology at Queens College, City University of New York in 1959. In 1963, Dobkin de Rios earned a M.A. in anthropology from New York University. She researched gender issues including the social aspects of purdah in Turkey and the French colonial empire's policies impacting women in French West Africa.

She conducted doctoral research on the Preclassic Maya's use of psychoactive plants. In 1972, she earned a Ph.D. at University of California, Riverside. Her dissertation was titled The Use of Hallucinogenic Substances in Peruvian Amazonian Folk Healing.

== Career ==
In 1972, Dobkin de Rios became a tenured professor cultural anthropology at California State University, Fullerton. She taught at Fullerton from 1969 until her retirement in 2000. Dobkin de Rios led fieldwork in the Peruvian and Brazilian Amazon for almost thirty years. Her research included the use of entheogenic plants by the indigenous peoples of Peru.

From 1999 to 2000, Dobkin de Rios directed the qualitative dimension of research of ayahuasca use among adolescents within the União do Vegetal in Brazil.

Dobkin de Rios was a fellow of the American Anthropological Association and the Royal Anthropological Institute of Great Britain and Ireland. She served as president of the Ethnopharmacology Society (1979-1981) and the Southwestern Anthropological Association (1979-1980).

== Personal life ==
On November 7, 1969, Dobkin married artist Yando Rios, son of Peruvian healer Don Hilde. They had two children. Dobkin de Rios died on November 10, 2012, in Placentia, California of cancer.

== Selected works ==
- Dobkin de Rios, Marlene (1972). Visionary Vine: Psychedelic Healing in the Peruvian Amazon. Chandler Publishing Company. ISBN 978-0-8102-0456-0.
- Dobkin de Rios, Marlene (1976). The Wilderness of Mind: Sacred Plants in Cross-Cultural Perspective. Sage Publications. ISBN 978-0-8039-0752-2.
- Dobkin de Rios, Marlene (1984). Hallucinogens, Cross-Cultural Perspectives. University of New Mexico Press. ISBN 978-0-8263-0737-8.
- Dobkin de Rios, Marlene (1992). Amazon Healer: The Life and Times of an Urban Shaman. Prism. ISBN 978-1-85327-076-5.
- Dobkin de Rios, Marlene; Janiger, Oscar (2003). LSD, Spirituality, and the Creative Process. Inner Traditions / Bear & Co. ISBN 978-0-89281-973-7.
- Dobkin de Rios, Marlene; Rumrrill, Róger (2008). A Hallucinogenic Tea, Laced with Controversy: Ayahuasca in the Amazon and the United States. Greenwood Publishing Group. ISBN 978-0-313-34542-5.
- Dobkin de Rios, Marlene (2009). The Psychedelic Journey of Marlene Dobkin de Rios: 45 Years with Shamans, Ayahuasqueros, and Ethnobotanists. Simon and Schuster. ISBN 978-1-59477-891-9.
- Dobkin de Rios, Marlene (2011). Fate, Fortune, and Mysticism in the Peruvian Amazon: The Septrionic Order and the Naipes Cards. Simon and Schuster. ISBN 978-1-59477-947-3.
