= Russian given name =

Russian naming system

Russian given names are provided at birth or selected during a name change. Orthodox Christian names constitute a fair proportion of Russian given names, but there are many exceptions including pre-Christian Slavic names, Communist names, and names taken from ethnic minorities in Russia. Given names form a distinct area of the Russian language with some unique features.

The evolution of Russian given names dates back to the pre-Christian era, though the list of common names changed drastically after the adoption of Christianity. In medieval Russia two types of names were in use: canonical names given at baptism (calendar or Christian names, usually modified) and non-canonical. The 14th century was marked by the elimination of non-canonical names, that ended by the 18th century. In the 20th century after the October Revolution the whole idea of a name changed. It was a completely new era in the history of Russian names, marked by significant changes in common names.

The names of popular saints are known as "calendar names" from their occurrence in the Eastern Orthodox liturgical calendar. A common custom is to name the baby for the saint who is the patron over their birthday. Such names include Ivan (Иван, "John"), Andrei (Андрей, "Andrew"), Yakov (Яков, "Jacob"), Yuri (Юрий, "George"), Tatyana (Татьяна, "Tatiana"), Maria (Мария, "Mary"), Avdotia (Авдотья, "Eudocia"), Elizaveta (Елизавета, "Elizabeth"), Margarita (Маргарита, "Margaret"). The group of calendar names includes traditional names that used to be listed in orthodox menologia prior to the October Revolution and in popular calendars of the Soviet era that had been printed since the second half of the 19th century. In the Soviet Union in the 1980s, 95% of the Russian-speaking population had calendar names.

Ancient Slavic names include Stanislav (Станислав), Rada (Рада) and Radomir (Радомир), and Dobromila. Old Russian names include Zhdan (Ждан), Peresvet (Пересвет), Lada (Лада), and Lyubava (Любава). Soviet-era names include Vilen (Вилен), Avangard (Авангард), Ninel (Нинель), and Era (Эра). Names borrowed from other languages include Albert (Альберт), Ruslan (Руслан), Zhanna (Жанна), and Leyla (Лейла).

The number of currently used names is relatively small. According to various estimations no more than 600 masculine and feminine names more or less regularly appear in modern generations: the main body of given names does not exceed 300–400.

== History ==
The history of Russian given names is usually divided in three stages:

- pre-Christian, period of pagan names, created by means of Old-East Slavic language.
- Christian, foreign Christian names began to replace old pagan names; small proportion of traditional names became canonical;
- modern, starting from October Revolution, characterized by elimination of difference between canonical, calendar and non-calendar names, active borrowing and active name construction.

=== Before the Christian era ===
Before the adoption of Christianity until the end of the 10th century, eastern Slavs (ancestors of modern Russians, Ukrainians and Belarusians) used almost exclusively Slavonic names which were given at birth. No distinction between first name and nickname was made during this period. Given names in Old East Slavonic language (nickname, epithet, handle) are similar to appellation after a particular episode. Pre-Christian names were used in Rus' several centuries after adoption of Christianity. They were commonly used alongside Christian names until the end of the XVII century.

Old Slavonic names are exceptionally diverse. The Dictionary of Old Slavonic names by N. M. Tupikov, printed in 1903, comprised 5300 masculine and 50 feminine names. Old Slavonic names fall in several categories:

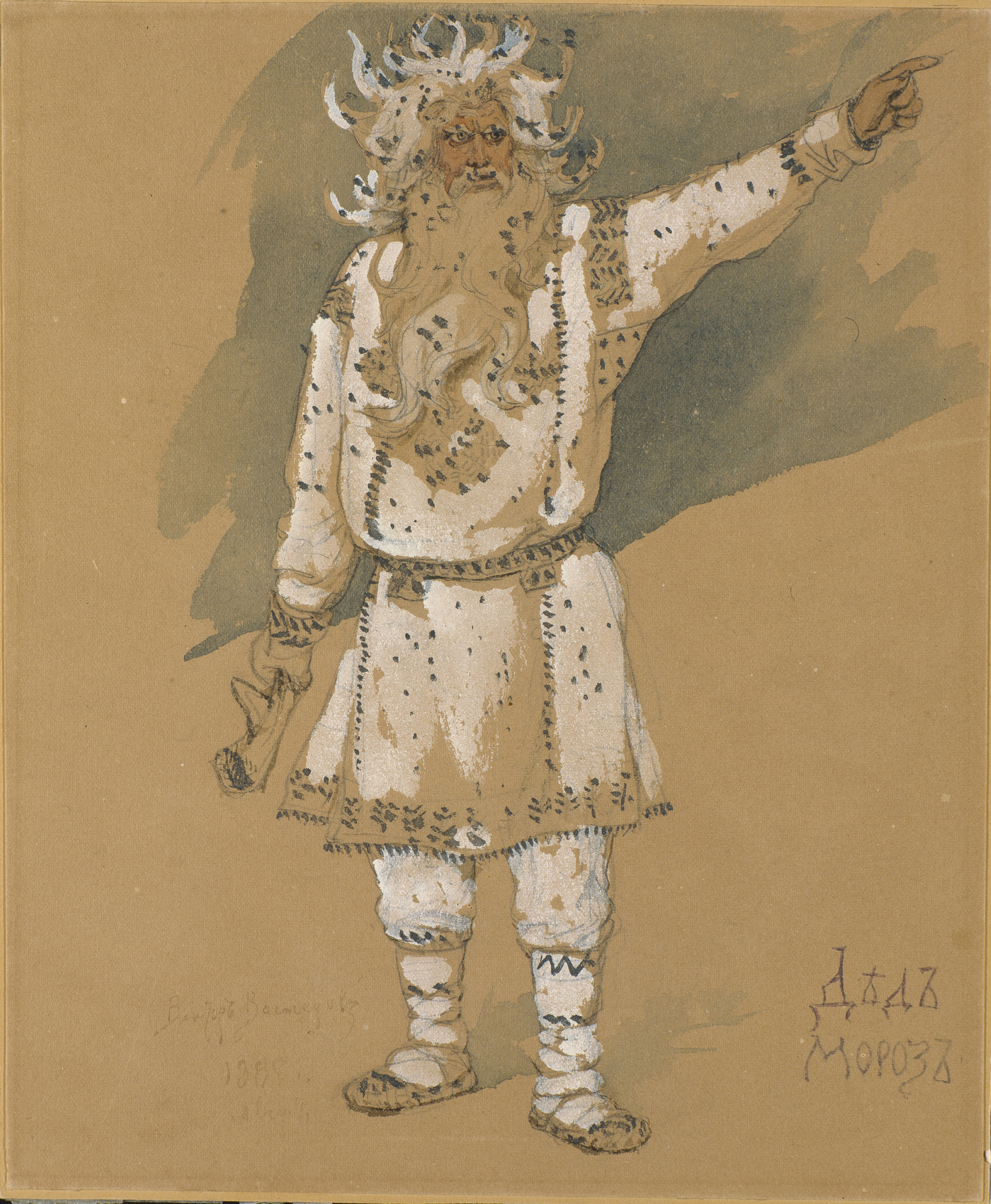
«Moroz» (Russian: Мороз, "Frost") used to be a personal name, hence the popularity of the surname Morozov

- Numerical names representing birth order in a family: Perva, Pervoy (the first), Vtorak (the second), Tretyak (the third), Chetvertak (the fourth) and so on. Due to biological limitations, those names wouldn't go far beyond ten (Desyatko).
- Names based on individual characteristics, like hair and skin color. Names like Chernysh, Chernyai, Chernyava,(=black one) Bel, Belyai, Belyak, Beloukha (=white one) were widely used. Constitution features also could be reflected in a name: Mal (Small), Малюта, Малой (Smaller), Долгой (Tall), Сухой (thin one), Толстой (Fat one), Голова (Head), Головач, Лобан, Беспалой (Fingerless).
- Names describing personality, habits and behaviour. Among them Забава (fun or game), Истома, Крик (scream), Скряба, Молчан (silent one), Неулыба (one who does not smile), Булгак (restless), Смеяна (one who laughs) и Несмеяна (one who does not laugh).
- Names reflecting attitude toward the child, whether it was longed for: Богдан (gift of God) и Богдана, Бажен (desired one), Голуба, Любава (loved one), Ждан (awaited one) и Неждан (unexpected one), Хотен, Чаян и Нечай.
- Seasonal names: Veshnyak Вешняк (spring one), Zima Зима (winter), Moroz Мороз (frost).
- Animal and plant-related names: Бык (bull), Волк (wolf), Ворон (raven), Щука (pike), Кот (cat), Кошка (she-cat), Жеребец (Stallion), Корова (cow), Щавей (from щавель, Rumex), Трава (grass), Пырей. It is believed that this kind of name is a relic of totem beliefs.
- Names related to beliefs that "bad" words can deflect evil spirits, diseases and even death: Горяин, Немил, Некрас (ugly one), Нелюба (loveless one), Неустрой, Злоба (Anger), Тугарин (from туга — печаль, sorrow).
- Names related to other nations : Chudin Чудин (after Chud people, чудь), Karel Карел, Tatarin Татарин, Kozarin Козарин (от названия хазар), Ontoman Онтоман (after Turks people, оттоманы).

All previously mentioned names fall into domestic category were used in family circle. However, when a person entered a broader social group (changing his occupation or place of residence), his name was replaced or supplemented by another. This sort of nickname exceeds family names in number - an adult has more distinct characteristics that can be used as a basis for a nickname than a child.

Not all pre-Christian names were equally popular. Only some tens of several thousand names were actively used. Popularity of pagan names resulted in formation of various diminutive forms: Bychko from Byk, Zhdanko from Zhdan, Puzeika from Puzo and so on. The most popular names had many forms. For example, root -bel- produced a wide range of names like Bela, Belka, Belava, Beloy, Belonya, Belyay, Belyash. Root -sem- produced 33 names, including Semanya, Semeika and Semushka.

Increasing influence of the Russian Orthodox church on social life led to gradual elimination of pagan nicknames. However, they didn't become completely extinct, as they served as basis for major part of Russian surnames (the first stage of surname formation took place in the 15th century).

=== Establishment of Russian naming tradition ===
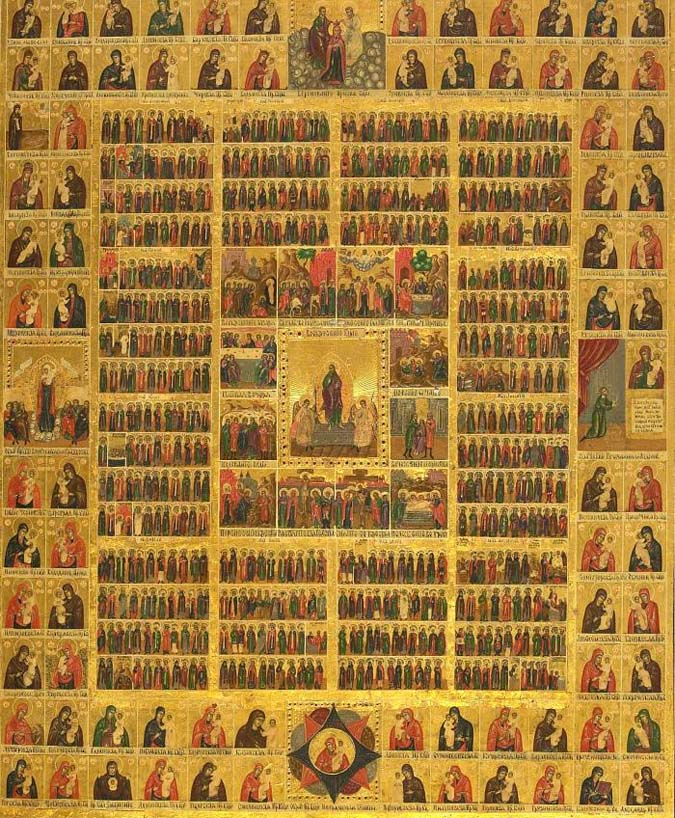
Icon "Минеи на год" (Russian: Minei na god, Year calendar) picturing all saints organized by their respective days. This kind of icon was exhibited in a church, so that even the illiterate could consult them at any moment.

Adoption of Christianity led to introduction of completely new, foreign names that were tightly connected to baptism ceremony: according to Christian tradition baptism presumes giving Christian name. Names were given according to Menaion (Месячные минеи), special books which described religious services, ceremonies for each day, including which saint to praise. Religious tradition dictated that children should be named in honor of a saint, praised on the day of baptism. Sometimes on birthday, sometimes any day between birth and baptism. Minei were extremely expensive, so some churches couldn't afford them. One possible solution was to use menologia (Месяцеслов, святцы) – calendars with brief listing of religious celebrations and Saints days.

Minei were among the first books to be translated into Russian from Greek. With a rare exceptions names were not translated, preserving their original pronunciation. Their meaning was completely obscure for vast majority of people and they were perceived as alien. This state of things led on the one hand to long coexistence of Christian and pagan names and to active assimilation and transformation of Christian names.

==== Coexistence of old and new names ====
Christian and pagan names coexisted up to the 17th century. One of the reasons is that parents could not choose a name for a child freely – a newborn was baptized according to the menologium. Sometimes several children in one family would bear one name. Furthermore, the total number of names in the menologium at the time didn't exceed 400. Pagan nicknames being more diverse and less restrictive provided a convenient way to distinguish people bearing one name.

A practice established in the 14th to 16th centuries supposed giving two names: a baptismal name (usually modified) and a nickname. For example: Trofimko Czar (Torpes the Czar), Fedka Knyazets, Karp Guba, Prokopiy Gorbun (Procopius the Humpback), Amvrosiy Kovyazin, Sidorko Litvin. This practice was widespread in all stratas. Boyar Andrei Kobyla (lit. Andrew the Mare) a progenitor of Romanov dynasty and some other boyar families man serve as an example as well his sons' names: Semyon Zherebets (Semyon the Stallion), Aleksandr Yolka (Alexandre the Spruce), Fyodor Koshka (Fyodor the Cat). Craftsmen did name their children in the same manner. For example, Ivan Fyodorov the first man to print a book often signed as Ivan Fyodorov, son of Moskvit (Иван Фёдоров сын Москвитин may also be translated as Ivan son of Fyodor, the moscovite).

Influence of Russian Orthodox church steadily grew in 11th–14th centuries, its influence as a consolidating religious force after Mongol invasion of Rus and during period of feudal fragmentation in Kiev Rus became especially important. Unification of Russian feudal states also contributed to raise of church's influence on policy and society. Under influence of the church many knyazes, descendants of Rurik, began to abandon their pagan names in favor of Christian names.

=== Separation of baptismal, popular and literary forms ===
In XVII century, names divided in the three distinct forms: popular (spoken), literary and baptismal (church form). This process was boosted by Patriarch Nikon's reform. One of the ventures he undertook was to correct religious books, which had accumulated a lot of errors and misreadings as they used to be copied by sometimes illiterate scribes. As a result, religious services differed in different parts of the country. Patriarch Nikon set the goal to unify service in Russia and to correct errors in religious books (including menologia). New translations from Greek were made to achieve this goal. Corrected versions were printed in 1654.

=== Early Soviet Union ===
Modern era begins right after October Revolution. The decree "On Separation of Church from State and Schools from Church" outlawed connection of any public and social acts with religious ceremonies. Since that baptism ceased to be a legally binding act. The right to register names was handed to civil authorities, namely civil registry. As a result, the whole conception of name changed. Naming no longer depended on religious traditions and rules. Direct and tight connection with orthodox saints names was lost. Any citizen was free to choose a name he wished for himself and his children. As a matter of fact, any word could be used as a name; function of civil registry was reduced to proper registration of citizens.

Social innovations gave incentive to develop "new names for new life". Mikhail Frunze, a high-ranked soviet officer, Civil war veteran was among the first to use a new name, naming his son Timur. Another example is the case of Demyan Bedny, a well-known atheistic activist who named his son Svet. The Soviet writer Artem Veseliy named his daughter Volga.

Since 1924 Gosizdat started issuing calendars similar to those that had existed prior to the Revolution. This new kind of calendars included traditional but rare names given without reference to saints as well as new names. New names comprised non-baptismal names, both Russian and Slavic, borrowed names and newly formed names. Calendars of 1920-30 being a good reference wasn't the only source of names. As mentioned above, parents were free to pick any name they wished, and this freedom led to active name formation, which later was dubbed "anthroponymic bang".

== Formal Russian name and its derivative forms ==
=== Legal given name ===
According to Russian naming tradition, people are addressed by their name followed by a patronymic in official speech. In official situations, one's given name is always written or spoken in its legal form (name given at birth and documented in papers like birth certificate and passport).

Prior to October Revolution, canonical form was considered official. It was documented in baptismal register books. However, in birth certificate and other documents a secular form was used. Arising ambiguity was not considered important and did not cause any legal consequences. In baptismal register books, people bearing names Yuriy and Egor appeared as Georgy, but in other documents, they could use the variant they were used to.

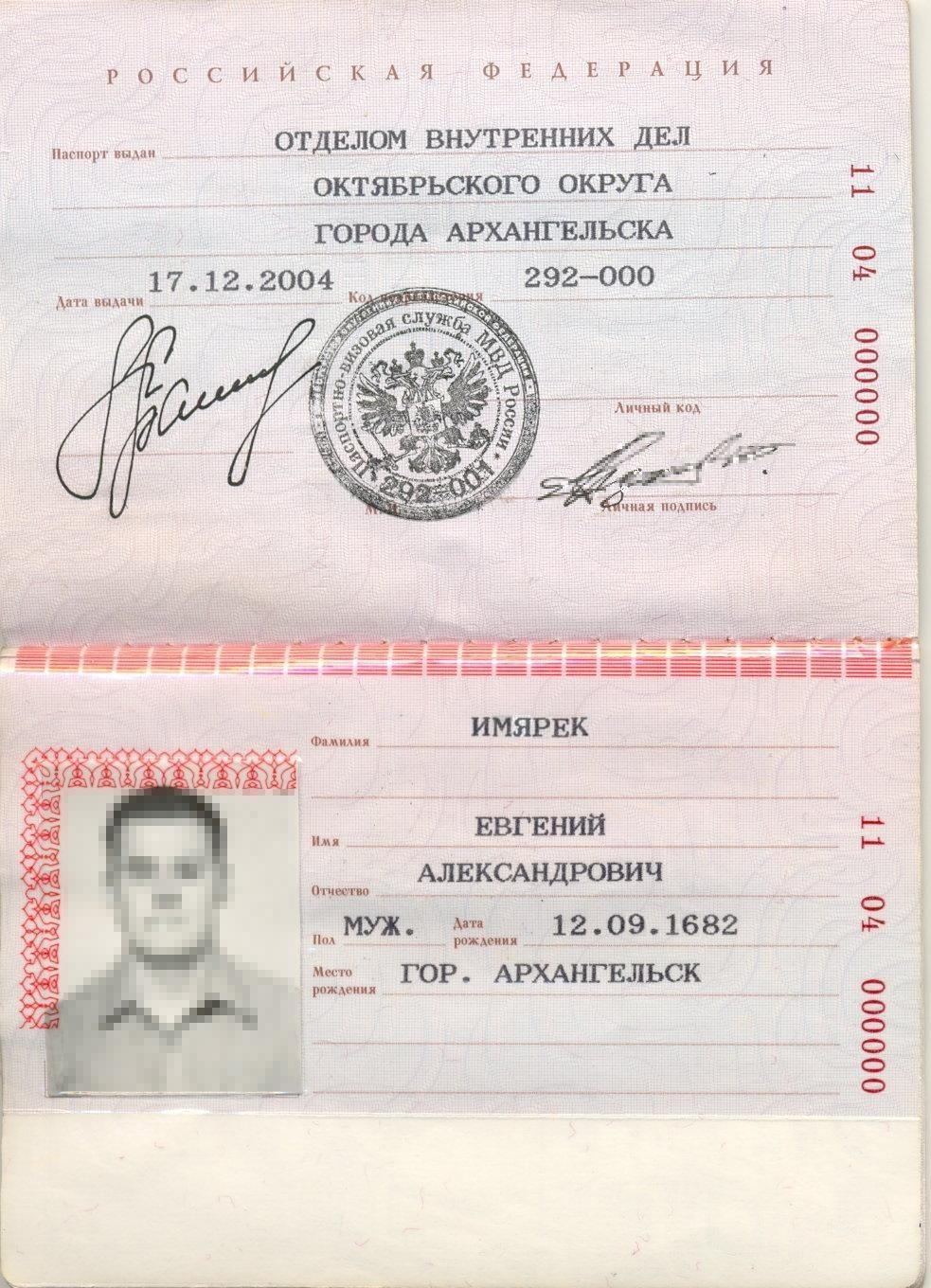
Russian internal passport

After the Revolution, various forms of one's name started being considered as different names. Names from the example above – Georgy, Yegor and Yuriy became legally different names after the Revolution. Generally, names are considered to be different if they acquired significant differences during assimilation, as in following cases:

- Names have different initials: Elena and Alyona, Irina and Arina, Anastasia and Nastasya, Iosif and Osip, Yuliania and Ulyana.
- Differing in stem: Georgiy and Yuriy, Cyprian and Cupryan, Evstafiy and Ostap.

There are names which, being legally different, are considered the same in common usage and share short forms, like Nataliya and Natalya (short form – Natasha).

=== Full (formal) and short forms ===
As opposed to full forms used in formal situations, short forms of a name are used in communication between well-acquainted people, usually relatives, friends and colleagues. Short forms emerged in spoken language for convenience as majority of formal names are cumbersome. They are often multi-syllabic or otherwise phonetically aberrant. Short forms, being stylistically neutral, demonstrate that people using them are in close relationships and equal statuses. In cases where elder people address younger ones, short names also are stylistically neutral.

Short form were derived from truncated stems of full forms, sometimes preserving very little in common. There are traditional short form, formed by adding -a or -ya suffix to a truncated stem of a name: Valer(y) → Valera, Fyod(or) → Fedya, Rom(an) → Roma, Pyot(r) → Petya, Ol(ga) → Olya, Vic(toriya) → Vika. Such transformation results in a short word ending with an open syllable, convenient to address or call a person.

Russian language has neutral suffixes that are used (sometimes with -a and -ya) with more radically truncated stems:

- -sh-: Ma(ria) → Masha, Pa(vel) → Pasha, Mi(khail) → Misha, Da(rya) → Dasha, (A)le(ksey) → Lyosha, (Alek)sa(ndr) → Sasha;
- -n-: Ma(ria) → Manya, So(fya) → Sonya, Ta(tyana) → Tanya, Ga(vriil) → Ganya, Ge(nnadiy) → Gena, (An)to(nina) → Tonya, A(nna) → Anya;
- -k-: (Fe)li(zia) → Lika, I(gor') → Ika, Mi(khail) → Mika;
- -s- and -us-: Lyud(mila) → Lyuda, (A)ga(fya) → Gasya, (Ev)d(okiya) → Dusya etc..

Unrestrained derivation of new names made possible coexistence of multiple short forms of the same name. For example, Irina → Rina, Risha, Irisha, Ina; Vitaliy → Vitalya, Vita, Vitya, Talya, Vitasha. On the other hand, extremely faint phonetic connection between short and full forms permits to associate one short form with many full names. For example "Dictionary of Russian personal names" by N.A. Petrovskiy corresponds Alya to 19 masculine and 18 feminine names including Aleksey, Oleg, Yuvenaliy, Aleksandr and Aleksandra, Alisa, Alla, Galina.

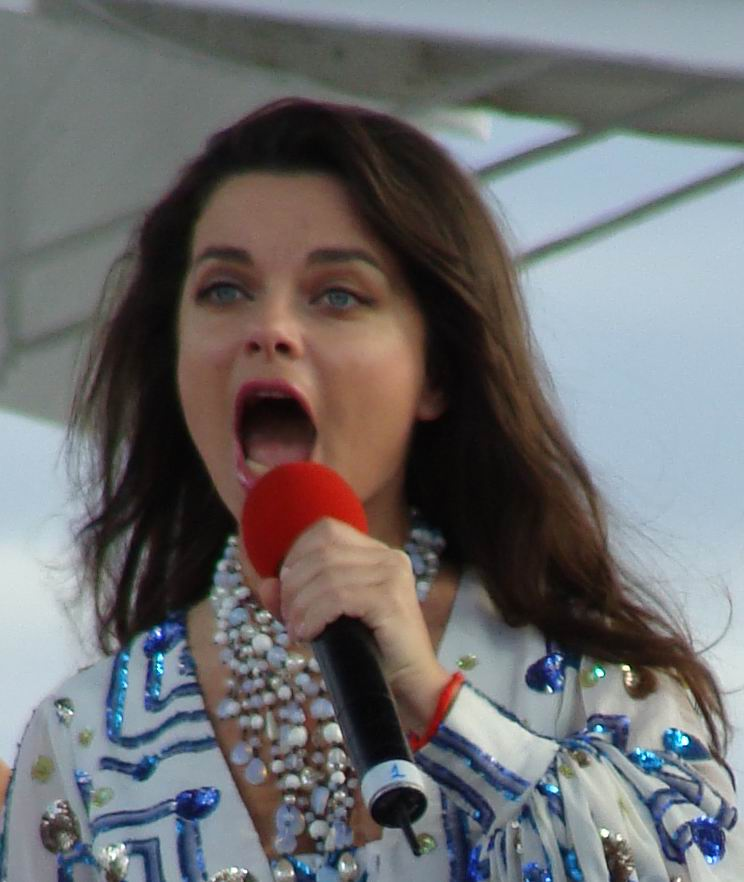
No fan would designate Natasha Korolyova as «Natalya Vladimirovna»

There are names for which a short form is difficult to produce. These are usually rare names like Erast, Orest, Toviy, Radiy, Rosa and suchlike. Also some (usually two-syllable) names in are traditionally used in full form even in informal conversation disregarding their short forms (Andrey, Igor, Oleg, Vera, Inna, Nina).

As already stated above, the short form is generally used in spoken conversation between acquainted people and usually doesn't act as an official or public name. However starting from the late 1980s in popular culture, in artistic circles short names gained new status. They appear on posters, disk covers and are widely used in mass media. Dima Malikov, Dima Bilan, Vlad Topalov, Nastya Poleva, Tanya Bulanova, Vika Tsyganova, Lyuba Uspenskaya, Masha Rasputina, Natasha Koroleva became known under their short names. This approach is perceived as accepted part of artistic freedom.

== Soviet-era name formation ==
The "anthroponymic bang" of the 1920s and 1930s produced several distinct categories of new names. One major category consisted of acronyms and contractions derived from revolutionary slogans and the names of Soviet leaders. Vilen (Вилен) was formed from the initials of Vladimir Ilyich Lenin; Vladlen (Владлен) combined Vladimir and Lenin; and Ninel (Нинель) was simply Lenin spelled backwards. Mels (Мэлс) compressed the surnames Marx, Engels, Lenin and Stalin into a single name. Among the most striking examples is Dazdraperma (Даздраперма), an abbreviation of the Russian phrase Da zdravstvuyet pervoe Maya ("Long live the First of May"). A second category honoured revolutionary figures directly: names like Telman (after German Communist Ernst Thälmann) and Kim (reinterpreted as an acronym for the Communist Youth International) were widely used. A third category expressed ideological concepts through new coinages: Avangard (Авангард, "vanguard"), Traktorina (after the tractor as a symbol of industrialisation) and Oktyabrina (after the October Revolution) all appeared during this period. The proliferation of these names was also encouraged by a short-lived "new Soviet rite" of civil naming ceremonies, promoted as a secular substitute for baptism.

Many Russian short names are used, in slightly adapted form, as full legal given names in Serbia, Montenegro and Croatia. For example: Anja, Daša, Feđa, Katja, Manja, Maša, Nastja, Nataša, Olja, Saša, Sonja, Staša, Tanja, Vanja, Varja, Vasja.

=== Diminutive forms ===
In Russian, there are an extremely large number of expressive forms for given names. Diminutive forms constitute a distinct body among various derivative forms. As opposed to full, formal names, their short forms are emotional. They demonstrate warm and tender attitude towards addressee, although some diminutive forms can bear slighting or pejorative emotions. Generally, diminutive forms are used by close relatives, such as parents addressing their children, and good friends.

Diminutive and affectionate forms are derived by adding various diminutive suffixes (-ochk-, -echk-, -onyk-, -enyk-, -ushk-, -yushk-, -yush-, -yash-, -ul-, -ush-, -un-, -us-, -k-, -ik- &c.). Diminutive forms can be derived from both short and full names. For example: from Maria (full form) following diminutive forms can be derived:

- Maria → Maryunya, Marunya, Marusya, Maryusha, Maryushka and Maryasha.
- Masha (short form) → Mashka, Mashenyka, Mashulya.
- Manya (another short form) → Manechka, Manyusya, Manyusha, Manyasha etc.

From Viktor (full form) following diminutive forms can be derived:

- Viktor → Vitya.
- Vitya (short form) → Vitenka, Vit'ka.

Diminutives derived with -k- suffix (Sashka, Grishka, Svetka etc.) carry a pejorative tint. This is related to a historical tradition to use semi-names to refer to oneself when speaking with a person of higher social status. However, among peers this form didn't have such a tint, indicating only simplicity in communication and close relation. Nonetheless, in modern Russian diminutives like Vasyka, Marinka, Vit'ka, Alka are considered stylistically lowered.

== See also ==
- East Slavic name
