= Lada (disambiguation) =

Lada is a Russian brand of automobile.

Lada or LADA may also refer to:

== Military ==
- Lada-class submarine
- London Air Defence Area, a World War I organization which attempted to defend London from air raids
- ČZ 2000, a type of Czech assault rifle based on the LADA prototype

== People ==
- Lada (given name), Slavic female given name
- Lada (surname)

== Places ==
- Ladha or Lada, a town in South Waziristan, Pakistan
- Lada, Asturias, a parish in Spain
- Łada, Lublin Voivodeship, a village in Poland
- Lada, Prešov District, a village in Slovakia
- Łada (river), in Poland
- Lada, a village in Tătărăștii de Jos Commune, Romania

== Science and technology ==
- 2832 Lada, a minor planet
- Laser-assisted device alteration, a technique used in semiconductor analysis
- Latent autoimmune diabetes in adults, a form of type 1 diabetes mellitus
- Area codes in Mexico, known there as LADA (larga distancia) codes

== Sports ==
- FC Lada-Togliatti, a Russian football team
- HC Lada Togliatti, a Russian hockey team
- Łada Biłgoraj, a Polish football club based in Biłgoraj

== Other uses ==
- Lada (mythology), a goddess in Baltic and Slavic mythology
- Łada coat of arms

== See also ==
- Lada Izhevsk, a subsidiary of the carmaker AvtoVAZ based in Izhevsk, Russia
- Lada Terra, a highland on Venus
- Ladas (disambiguation)
