= Finnish orthography =

Spelling conventions of the Finnish language

Finnish orthography is based on the Latin script, and uses an alphabet derived from the Swedish alphabet, officially comprising twenty-nine letters but also including two additional letters found in some loanwords. The Finnish orthography strives to represent all morphemes phonologically and, roughly speaking, the sound value of each letter tends to correspond with its value in the International Phonetic Alphabet (IPA) – although some discrepancies do exist.

== Alphabet ==
Finnish alphabet
Pronunciation as audio. Includes ⟨w⟩ after ⟨v⟩.

The following table describes how each letter in the Finnish alphabet (Finnish: suomen aakkoset) is spelled and pronounced separately. If the name of a consonant begins with a vowel (usually ⟨ä⟩ [æ]), it can be pronounced and spelled either as a monosyllabic or bisyllabic word. In practice, the names of the letters are rarely spelled, as people usually just type the (uppercase or lowercase) glyph when they want to refer to a particular letter.

The pronunciation instructions enclosed in slashes are broad transcriptions based on the IPA system. In notes, more narrow transcriptions are enclosed in square brackets.

Glyphs	Name	Name pronunciation	Notes on usage (for more, see Finnish phonology)
A, a	aa	/ɑː/	
B, b	bee	/beː/	Occurs in relatively new loanwords, such as banaani 'banana' and bussi 'bus'. Typically represents [b̥] or [p].
C, c	see	/seː/	Occurs in unestablished loanwords, such as curry and cesium. Typically represents [k] or [s].
D, d	dee	/deː/	In present standard language, ⟨d⟩ stands for [d], but the pronunciation in dialects varies greatly.
E, e	ee	/eː/	The precise pronunciation tends to be between [e] and [ɛ].
F, f	äf, äffä	/æf/, /ˈæf.fæ/, occasionally /ef/	Occurs in relatively new loanwords, such as asfaltti 'asphalt' or uniformu 'uniform'. Historically and in dialectal pronunciation (apart from some Western dialects), /f/ is typically replaced with /ʋ/ or medially /hʋ/ (e.g. kahvi /ˈkah.ʋi/ ← Swedish kaffe 'coffee'). Even newer loanwords may have an alternative spelling where ⟨v⟩ has replaced ⟨f⟩ (asvaltti, univormu). Note that the names of the country, language, and nationality beginning with F (Finland, Finnish, Finn) are non-native, the native ones being Suomi, suomi, and suomalainen.
G, g	gee	/ɡeː/	Occurs natively in the digraph ⟨ng⟩, which marks the long velar nasal [ŋː] (with no [ɡ] sound). Otherwise ⟨g⟩ only occurs in relatively new loanwords, such as gaala 'gala' and geeni 'gene'. Typically represents [ɡ̊] or [k].
H, h	hoo	/hoː/	Normally a voiceless fricative, but the precise pronunciation depends on the preceding vowel; between two vowels may be pronounced as breathy-voiced [ɦ].
I, i	ii	/iː/	[i]
J, j	jii	/jiː/	Without exception [j] (English consonant ⟨y⟩), as in German and Swedish, never fricative or affricate as in French or English.
K, k	koo	/koː/	
L, l	äl, ällä	/æl/, /ˈæl.læ/, occasionally /el/	
M, m	äm, ämmä	/æm/, /ˈæm.mæ/, occasionally /em/	
N, n	än, ännä	/æn/, /ˈæn.næ/, occasionally /en/	
O, o	oo	/oː/	The precise pronunciation tends to be between [o] and [ɔ].
P, p	pee	/peː/	
Q, q	kuu	/kuː/	Mainly occurs in foreign proper names (in loanwords digraph ⟨qu⟩ has often been replaced with ⟨kv⟩, aside from unestablished recent loanwords, such as queer). Typically represents [k], though some speakers pronounce it as [ɡ].
R, r	är, ärrä	/ær/, /ˈær.ræ/, occasionally /er/	
S, s	äs, ässä	/æs/, /ˈæs.sæ/, occasionally /es/	
T, t	tee	/teː/	The precise pronunciation tends to be dental [t̪] rather than alveolar [t].
U, u	uu	/uː/	The precise pronunciation tends to be between [u] and [o].
V, v	vee	/ʋeː/	Typically represents approximant [ʋ] rather than fricative [v].
W, w	kaksoisvee tuplavee	/ʋeː/, /ˈkɑk.soisˌʋeː/, /ˈtup.lɑˌʋeː/	The "double-v" may occur natively as an archaic variant of ⟨v⟩, but otherwise in unestablished loanwords and foreign proper names only. It occurs in some rare surnames such as Waltari (e.g. Mika Waltari, a world-famous author) or in some rare first names such as Werner (e.g. Werner Söderström, a well-known publisher). In collation the letter ⟨w⟩ was treated like ⟨v⟩ before 2022. Typically represents [ʋ].
X, x	äks, äksä	/æks/, /ˈæk.sæ/, occasionally /eks/	Occurs in unestablished loanwords, such as taxi or fax, but there is often a preferred alternative where ⟨x⟩ has been replaced with digraph ⟨ks⟩ (taksi, faksi). Typically represents [ks].
Y, y	yy	/yː/	The precise pronunciation tends to be between [y] and [ø].
Z, z	tset, tseta	/tset/, /ˈtse.tɑ/	Occurs in unestablished loanwords, such as zeniitti /tse.niːt.ti/ 'zenith' or pizza, but there may be an alternative spelling with ⟨ts⟩ (e.g. pitsa). Typically represents [ts] (like in German), but sometimes [z] or [s].
Å, å	ruotsalainen oo	/oː/, /ˈruot.sɑˌlɑi.nen oː/	The "Swedish ⟨o⟩", carried over from the Swedish alphabet and redundant in Finnish; retained especially for writing Finland-Swedish proper names (such as Ståhlberg). All Finnish words containing ⟨å⟩ are proper names and their derivatives (ångström, åkermaniitti, vårdöläinen); there it represents [oː] (identically to ⟨oo⟩). The spelling spåra ('tram', colloquial, from Swedish spårvagn) sometimes occurs in practice, but the standard spelling is spora.
Ä, ä	ää	/æː/	
Ö, ö	öö	/øː/	The precise pronunciation tends to be between [ø] and [œ].

The letters ⟨š⟩ and ⟨ž⟩ are variants of ⟨s⟩ and ⟨z⟩, but they are often overlooked, as they are only used in some relatively new loanwords and foreign names, and may be replaced with ⟨sh⟩ and ⟨zh⟩, respectively, if it is technically impossible to reproduce ⟨š⟩ and ⟨ž⟩. The Finnish keyboard layout on Microsoft Windows does not include ⟨š⟩ or ⟨ž⟩; thus, in practice, only highly formal sources such as official texts, encyclopedias or Helsingin Sanomat use them.

Glyphs	Name	Name pronunciation	Notes on usage (for more, see Finnish phonology)
Š, š	hattu-äs, hattu-ässä; suhu-äs, suhu-ässä	/ˈhat.tu.æs/, /ˈhat.tu.æs.sæ/; /ˈsu.hu.æs/, /ˈsu.hu.æs.sæ/	The "⟨s⟩ with caron" is a rare variant of ⟨s⟩. It occurred in some relatively new loanwords, such as šakki 'chess' and šillinki 'shilling', but is often replaced with digraph ⟨sh⟩ (šampoo → shampoo) or, in more established loanwords, with plain ⟨s⟩ (sampoo). In theory it represents [ʃ] but actual pronunciation may vary.
Ž, ž	hattu-tset, hattu-tseta	/ˈhat.tuˌtset/, /ˈhat.tuˌtse.tɑ/	The "⟨z⟩ with caron" is a rare variant of ⟨z⟩. It occurs in some unestablished loanwords, such as džonkki 'junk', and foreign proper names, but is often replaced with digraph ⟨zh⟩. In theory it represents [ʒ] but the actual pronunciation may vary.

=== The extra letters ⟨ä⟩ and ⟨ö⟩ ===
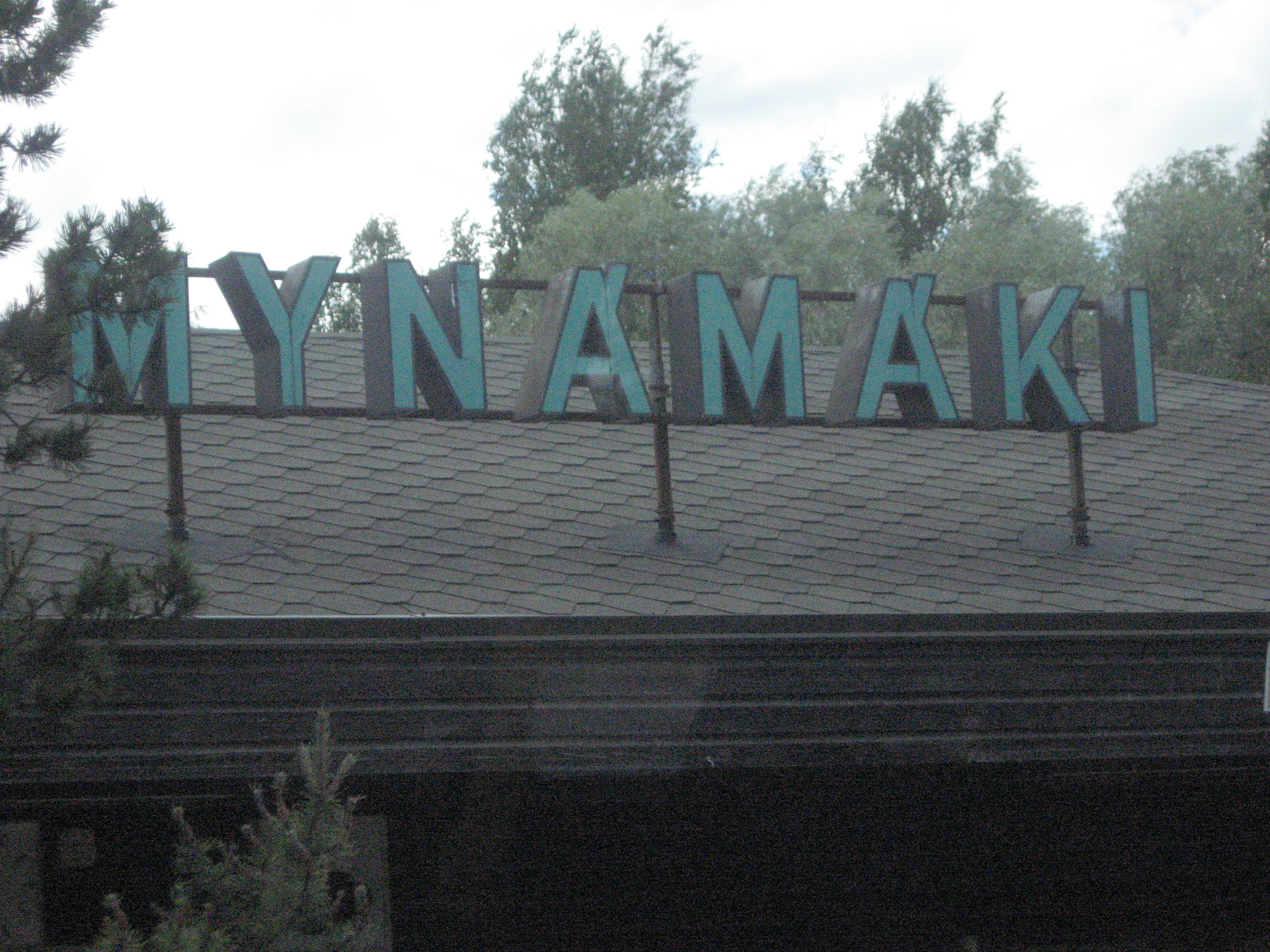
The sign at the bus station of the Finnish municipality Mynämäki, illustrating a stylized variation of ⟨ä⟩.

The main peculiarities in the Finnish alphabet are the two extra vowels ⟨ä⟩ and ⟨ö⟩ (and Swedish ⟨å⟩, which is not actually needed in Finnish). In Finnish, these extra letters are collectively called ääkköset when they need to be distinguished from the ISO basic Latin alphabet; the word is a somewhat playful modification of aakkoset, which is Finnish for "alphabet". Another informal term is skandit or skandimerkit, short for skandinaaviset merkit "Scandinavian characters" (however, the Danish and Norwegian ⟨æ⟩ and ⟨ø⟩ are usually not taken into account).

In Finnish, ⟨ä⟩, ⟨ö⟩ and ⟨y⟩ are the "front vowel" counterparts to the "back vowels" ⟨a⟩, ⟨o⟩ and ⟨u⟩; grammatical endings and suffixes using these letters, use either the front or back form depending on the vowel harmony of the word. The glyphs for ⟨ä⟩ and ⟨ö⟩ are derived from the similar-looking German umlauted letters, but as with ⟨y⟩ versus ⟨u⟩, they are considered letters in their own right and thus alphabetized separately (after ⟨z⟩).

The Germanic umlaut or convention of considering digraph ⟨ae⟩ equivalent to ⟨ä⟩, and ⟨oe⟩ equivalent to ⟨ö⟩ is inapplicable in Finnish. Moreover, in Finnish, both ⟨ae⟩ and ⟨oe⟩ are vowel sequences, not single letters, and they have independent meanings (e.g. haen "I seek" vs. hän "he, she").

In handwritten text, the actual form of the extra marking may vary from a pair of dots to a pair of short vertical bars, to a single horizontal bar, or to a wavy line resembling a tilde. In practice, almost any diacritic situated above the base glyph (such as, á ā ã) would probably be interpreted as a carelessly written pair of dots (ä). However, in computerized character sets, these alternatives are incorrect. The front-vowel counterpart of ⟨u⟩ using ⟨y⟩ rather than ⟨ü⟩ is carried over from Swedish, and also avoids confusion in cursive script with ⟨ii⟩, which is common in Finnish.

=== Non-native letters in the Finnish alphabet ===
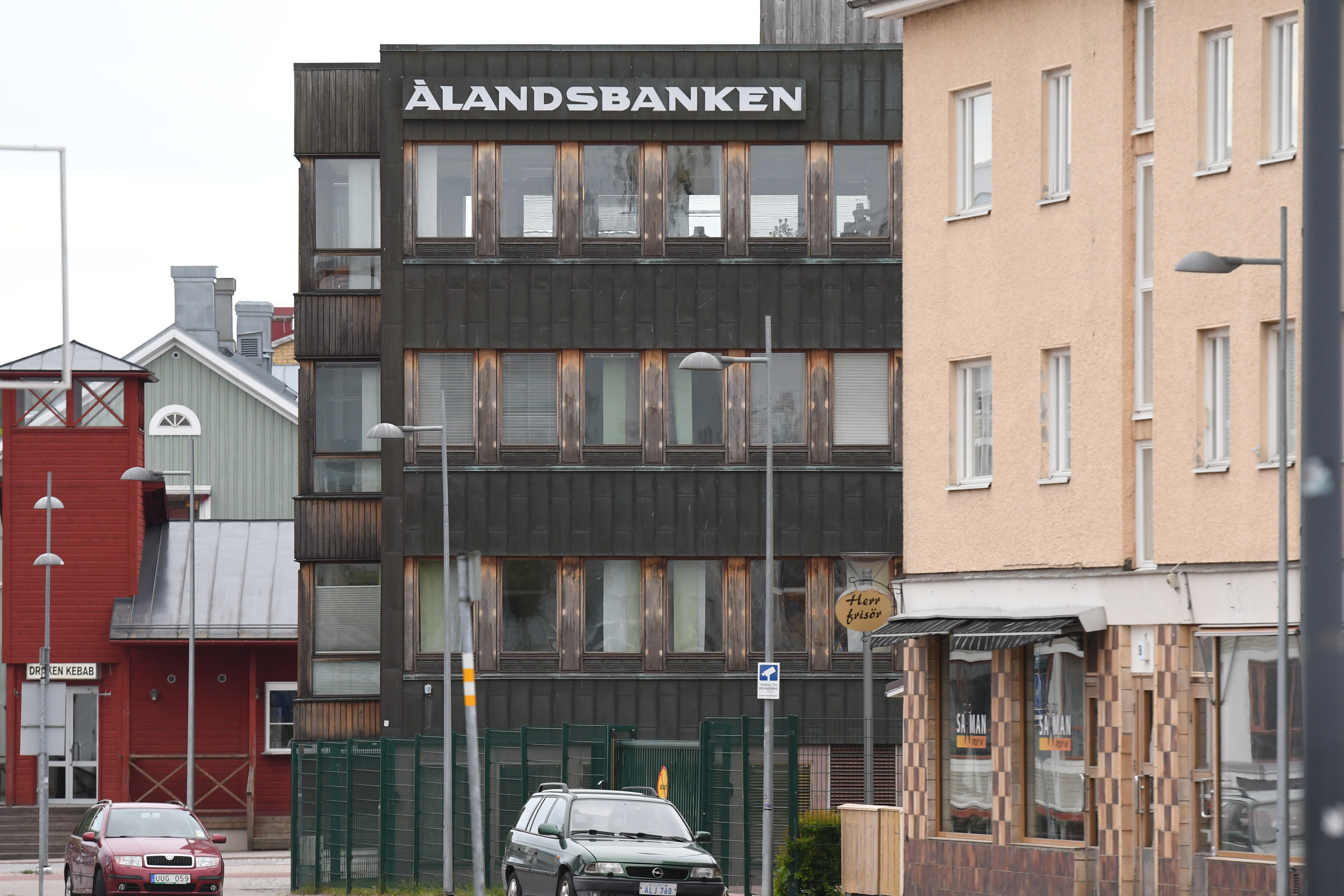
Ålandsbanken 'Bank of Åland' uses a stylized letter ⟨å⟩ in its logotype.

In the Finnish writing system, some basic Latin letters are considered redundant, and other letters generally represent sounds that are not inherent in the Finnish language. Thus, they are not used in established Finnish words, but they may occur in newer loanwords as well as in foreign proper names, and they are included in the Finnish alphabet in order to maintain interlingual compatibility. The pronunciation of these letters varies quite a lot.

- The redundant letters are often replaced with more common alternatives in Finnish, except in proper names. They include ⟨c⟩ (which may be replaced with either ⟨k⟩ or ⟨s⟩), ⟨q⟩ (which is usually replaced with ⟨k⟩, and particularly ⟨qu⟩ with ⟨kv⟩), and ⟨x⟩ (which is replaced with ⟨ks⟩). In addition, the Swedish ⟨å⟩ is redundant from the Finnish point of view, as its pronunciation is more or less equivalent to the Finnish way of pronouncing ⟨o⟩. It is officially included in the Finnish alphabet so that keyboards etc. would be compatible with Swedish, which is one of the two official languages in Finland, as well as for the reproduction of Swedish proper names, which are quite common in Finland, even as surnames of monolingual speakers of Finnish.
- The letters representing foreign sounds can be found in relatively new loanwords, but in more established loanwords they have been replaced with alternatives that better reflect the typical Finnish pronunciation, e.g. kahvi 'coffee', parta 'beard'. The letters include ⟨b⟩, ⟨f⟩, and ⟨g⟩ (which is also used to mark the inherent velar nasal [ŋ], however). From a historical point of view, even ⟨d⟩ could be said to belong to this group, but the [d] sound has long been an established part of standard language.
- The letters ⟨w⟩ and ⟨z⟩ could be classified into both of the aforementioned groups. The [w] sound is not regarded as a phoneme in Finnish, but historically ⟨w⟩ was used to mark [v] (or, rather, [ʋ]), as in Dutch, German or Polish. Although this is today considered archaic and ⟨v⟩ is used instead, ⟨w⟩ may still occur in some old surnames as a variant of ⟨v⟩. Occasionally this can also be applied for faux-archaic effect, as in Wanha Satama "Ye Olde Harbour". Likewise, the ⟨z⟩ is not native to Finnish, but ⟨z⟩ (or ⟨tz⟩) was formerly used to denote [ts] (as in German). It is still often represents [ts], but its pronunciation varies greatly: some speakers may pronounce it [z], or sometimes [tʃ]. The Finnish academic dictionary Kielitoimiston sanakirja prescribes pronunciations [ts] (e. g. zeniitti, zeoliitti, zoomi), [z] (e. g. azeri, zen, zulu), and [s] (e. g. zambo, zloty).
- The letters ⟨š⟩ [ʃ] and ⟨ž⟩ [ʒ] (⟨s⟩ and ⟨z⟩ with caron) are officially recommended instead of ⟨sh⟩ and ⟨zh⟩ for transliteration from another alphabet, although in practice, ⟨sh⟩ and ⟨zh⟩ are often used. For example, Russian Бре́жнев (transcribed Brezhnev in English) is transliterated Brežnev. However, these sounds are foreign to the Finnish language, the letters do not appear on Finnish keyboards and their pronunciation is not consistent. The [ʃ] sound is familiar to most Finnish speakers and quite commonly used in many loanwords, e.g. šakki 'chess', shampoo, but [ʒ] is restricted to foreign words only.

== Collation order ==
In Finnish, words are ordered alphabetically according to the collation rules specified in the official standard SFS 4600. There are a few cases where Finnish collation is different from the rules applied in English:

- ⟨å⟩, ⟨ä⟩ and ⟨ö⟩ are regarded as distinct letters and collated after ⟨z⟩
- Before 2022, ⟨w⟩ was regarded as equivalent to ⟨v⟩ (in a multilingual context it might, however, be collated separately after ⟨v⟩, as in English). Since 2022, the standard sorting is ⟨w⟩ after ⟨v⟩ (the same changing in sorting occurred in Danish in 1980 and in Swedish in 2006).

Diacritics are never added to letters in native Finnish words (as the dots above the Finnish graphemes ⟨ä⟩ and ⟨ö⟩ are not considered diacritics). Generally, diacritics are retained in foreign-language proper names, e.g. Vilén, if possible, but when arranging words alphabetically, diacritics are usually ignored (this also applies to ⟨š⟩ and ⟨ž⟩, despite them being an officially recognized part of Finnish orthography). There are, however, some exceptions:

- German and Turkish ⟨ü⟩ and Hungarian ⟨ű⟩ are alphabetized as ⟨y⟩, not as ⟨u⟩
- Danish and Norwegian ⟨ø⟩, Estonian ⟨õ⟩ and Hungarian ⟨ő⟩ are alphabetized as ⟨ö⟩, not as ⟨o⟩.

The standard does not specify how one should alphabetize the letter ⟨ü⟩ when used in other languages than German, but at least as regards the Estonian or Hungarian ⟨ü⟩, it seems consistent to treat it as equivalent to ⟨y⟩ (and even more so, since ⟨ü⟩ in Estonian and Hungarian is not considered a mere variant of ⟨u⟩, as it is in German). It would seem problematic, however, to apply the same principle to e.g. ⟨ü⟩ (u-diaeresis) as used in Spanish or ⟨õ⟩ (nasal vowel) as used in Portuguese, as these letters represent quite different orthographic traditions.

Other special cases:

- Sami ⟨ŋ⟩ (eng) is alphabetized as ⟨n⟩
- Sami ⟨đ⟩ (⟨d⟩ with stroke) and Icelandic ⟨ð⟩ (eth) are alphabetized as ⟨d⟩
- Icelandic ⟨þ⟩ (thorn) is alphabetized as ⟨th⟩
- Polish ⟨ł⟩ (⟨l⟩ with stroke) is alphabetized as ⟨l⟩.

Ligatures are alphabetized as two individual letters:

- ⟨æ⟩ is alphabetized as ⟨ae⟩ (not as ⟨ä⟩)
- ⟨œ⟩ is alphabetized as ⟨oe⟩ (not as ⟨ö⟩)
- ⟨ß⟩ is alphabetized as ⟨ss⟩.

Letters and characters taken from other alphabets (e.g. Σ 'Greek capital letter sigma') or writing systems are collated after Latin letters.

== Orthographic principles ==
When writing Finnish, the foundational principle is that each letter stands for one sound and each sound is always represented by the same letter, within the bounds of a single morpheme. The most notable exception to this rule is the velar nasal [ŋ], which does not have an allotted letter.

=== Short and long sounds ===
In Finnish, both vowels and consonants may be either short or long. A short sound is written with a single letter, and a long sound is written with a double letter (digraph). It is necessary to recognize the difference between such words as tuli /ˈtu.li/ 'fire', tuuli /ˈtuː.li/ 'wind' and tulli /ˈtul.li/ 'customs'. However, long consonants are sometimes written as short consonants in morpheme boundaries (see Finnish phonology#Sandhi for this phenomenon), thus, /ˈhɑ.kel.lɑ.vɑ/ is written as hakelava "open-box bed for wood chips" instead of expected *hakellava, and /ˈtu.let.tæn.ne/ is tule tänne "come here" instead of *tule ttänne or *tulet tänne.

In syllabification, a long consonant is always regarded as having a syllable break in the middle (as in /ˈtɑp.pɑː/), but a long vowel (or a diphthong) is regarded as a single unit that functions as the nucleus of a syllable. Either a long or short vowel may occur in a stressed as well as unstressed syllable. The phonetic quality of a vowel remains the same regardless of whether the vowel is long or short, or whether it is stressed or unstressed.

=== Velar nasal ===
The velar nasal /ŋ/ (generally referred to as äng-äänne 'the eng sound') does not have a letter of its own. Natively, a short /ŋ/ only occurs before /k/, and it is simply written with ⟨n⟩, as in kenkä /ˈkeŋ.kæ/ 'shoe'. Since the alveolar nasal /n/ can not occur in such a position, /ŋ/ can be seen as an allophone of /n/. However, if the /k/ is weakened (because of a phenomenon called consonant gradation that occurs when the word is inflected), the result is a long, or geminated, velar nasal /ŋː/ that is written with digraph ⟨ng⟩, as in kengät /ˈkeŋ.ŋæt/ 'shoes'. The geminated /ŋː/ is not an allophone of geminated /nː/, since minimal pairs do exist: kangas /ˈkɑŋ.ŋɑs/ 'textile' vs. kannas /ˈkɑn.nɑs/ 'isthmus'.

The treatment of the velar nasal in loanwords is highly inconsistent, often mixing the original spelling of the word with an applied Finnish pronunciation pattern. Englanti "England" is pronounced /ˈeŋ.lɑn.ti/ (with a short /ŋ/ but no /ɡ/), and even magneetti "magnet" is pronounced /ˈmɑŋ.neːt.ti/ (with plain ⟨g⟩ being pronounced as /ŋ/ when followed by ⟨n⟩, as in Swedish and classical Latin) – cf. a more specialized term diagnoosi /di.aɡ.noː.si/ 'diagnosis', and in a word-initial position gnuu /ɡnuː/ "gnu". Following the typical Finnish pronunciation pattern, kongestio "congestion" is often pronounced /ˈkoŋ.ŋes.ti.o/, but /ˈkoŋ.ɡes.ti.o/ may also occur.

=== Voiced plosives ===
Traditionally, /b/ and /ɡ/ are not counted as Finnish phonemes, since they only appear in loanwords. However, these borrowings being relatively common, they are nowadays considered part of the educated norm. The failure to use them correctly is sometimes ridiculed, e.g. if a news reporter or a high official consistently and publicly pronounces Belgia 'Belgium' as /ˈpel.ki.a/. Even many educated speakers, however, still make no distinction between voiced and voiceless plosives in regular speech, although minimal pairs exist: /ˈbus.si/ 'bus' vs. /ˈpus.si/ 'bag', /ˈɡo.ril.lɑ/ 'gorilla' vs. /ˈko.ril.lɑ/ 'with/at a basket'.

The status of /d/ is somewhat different from /b/ and /ɡ/, since it appears in native Finnish words, too, as a regular "weak" correspondence of the voiceless /t/ (as a result of consonant gradation), and even in the infinitives of many verbs, such as syödä, "to eat". At the time when Mikael Agricola, the "father" of literary Finnish, devised a system for writing the language, this sound still had the value of the voiced dental fricative /ð/, as in English "then". Agricola chose to mark it with ⟨d⟩ or ⟨dh⟩, which corresponded to the way it was traditionally written in Swedish (although the sound was in the process of disappearing in most Swedish dialects during that period).

Later on, the /ð/ sound developed in a variety of ways in different Finnish dialects: it was deleted, or became a hiatus, a flap consonant, or any of ⟨r⟩, ⟨l⟩, ⟨j⟩, ⟨jj⟩. For example, historical and rare dialectal meiðän, käðen "our" (gen.), "hand" (gen.) could be:

- meij(j)än, käen/käjen
- meirän, kären
- meilän, kälen
- (rare) meidän, käden

In the middle of the 19th century, a significant portion of the Swedish-speaking upper class in Finland decided that Finnish had to be made equal in usage to Swedish. They even started using Finnish as their home language, even while very few of them really mastered it well. Since the historical */ð/ no more had a common way of pronunciation between different Finnish dialects and since it was usually written as ⟨d⟩, many started using the Swedish pronunciation [d], which eventually became the educated norm.

Initially, few native speakers of Finnish acquired the foreign plosive realisation of the native phoneme. Still some decades ago it was not entirely exceptional to hear loanwords like deodorantti 'deodorant' pronounced as /teotorantti/, while native Finnish words with a /d/ were pronounced in the usual dialectal way. Nowadays, the Finnish language spoken by native Swedish speakers is not anymore considered paradigmatic, but as a result of their long-lasting prestige, many people particularly in the capital district acquired the new [d] sound. Due to diffusion of the standard language through mass media and basic education, and due to the dialectal prestige of the capital area, the plosive [d] can now be heard in all parts of the country, at least in loanwords and in formal speech. Nowadays replacing /d/ with a /t/ is considered rustic, for example /nyt tarvittais uutta tirektiiviä/ instead of /nyt tarvittaisiin uutta direktiiviä/ 'now we could use a new directive'.

In Helsinki slang, the slang used by some, more rarely nowadays, in Helsinki, the voiced stops are found in native words even in positions which are not the result of consonant gradation, e.g. /dallas/ 's/he walked' (← native verb root talla-), /bonjata/ 'to understand' (← Russian /ponʲiˈmatʲ/ понимать). In the Southwestern dialects of Rauma-Eurajoki-Laitila area, /b/, /d/ and /ɡ/ are commonplace, since the voicing of nasals spread to phonemes /p/, /t/ and /k/, making them half-voiced, e.g. /sendä/ ← sentään or /ninɡo/ ← niin kuin. They are also found in those coastal areas where Swedish influenced the speech.

== The spelling alphabet ==
Letter	spelling name
A, a	Aarne
B, b	Bertta
C, c	Celsius
D, d	Daavid
E, e	Eemeli
F, f	Faarao
G, g	Gideon
H, h	Heikki
I, i	Iivari
J, j	Jussi
K, k	Kalle
L, l	Lauri
M, m	Matti
N, n	Niilo
O, o	Otto
P, p	Paavo
Q, q	Kuu
R, r	Risto
S, s	Sakari
T, t	Tyyne
U, u	Urho
V, v	Vihtori
W, w	Wiski
X, x	Äksä
Y, y	Yrjö
Z, z	Tseta
Å, å	Åke
Ä, ä	Äiti
Ö, ö	Öljy
