= Boala Corona =

Corona on Venus

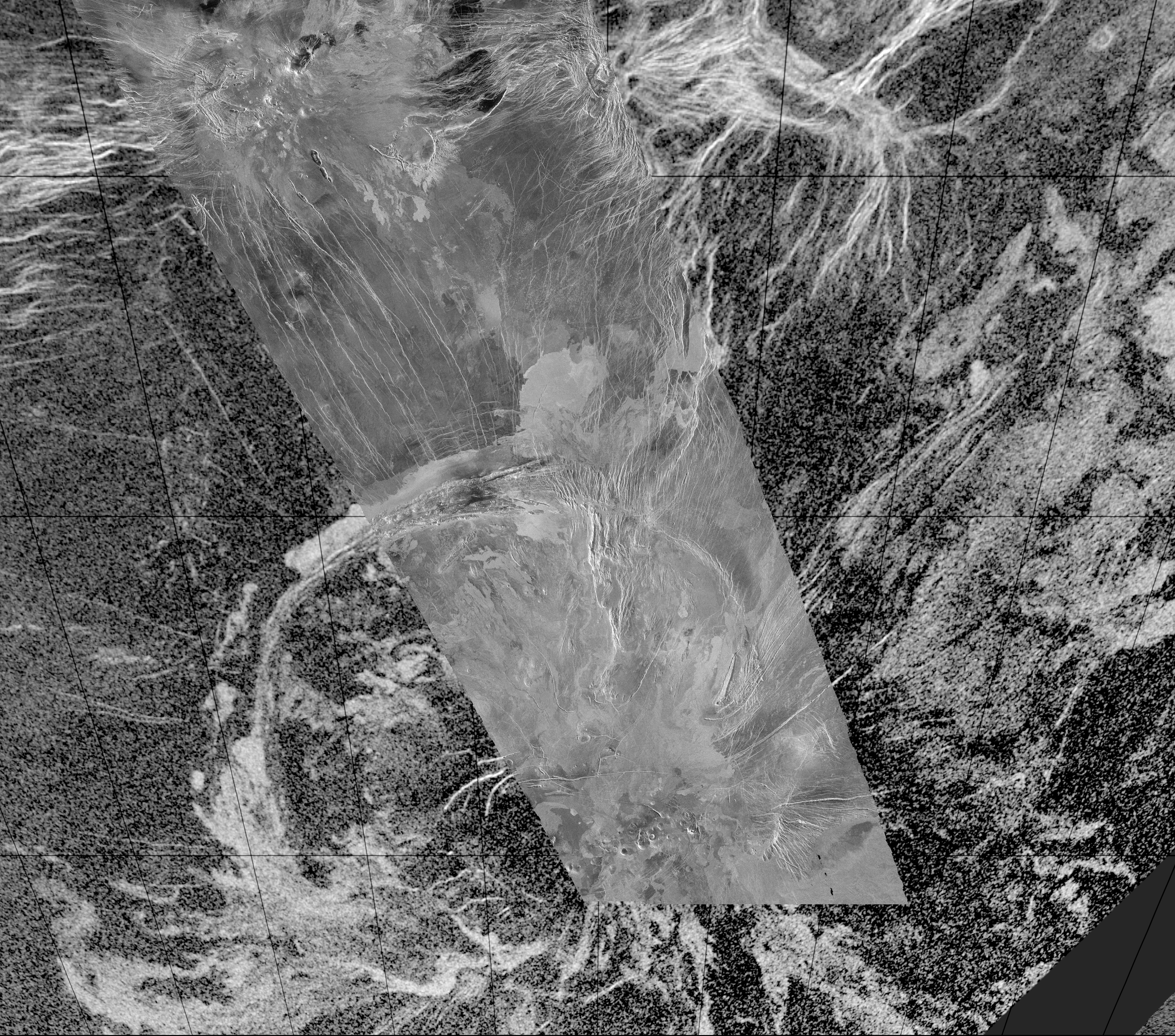
- Boala is barely visible to the south inside of Quetzalpetlatl Corona.
- Feature type: Corona
- Location: Lada Terra, Quetzalpetlatl Corona, Venus
- Diameter: 220 km
- Eponym: Mongo-Nkundo (Bantu group, Zaire) the first woman, ancestor of people.

Boala Corona is a 220 km diameter corona located in Lada Terra on the surface of Venus.

Its name derives from the Mongo-Nkundo first woman, ancestor of people, and was accepted in the year 1997

== Geology and characteristics ==
Boala corona is located inside another corona named Quetzalpetlatl Corona, which is situated at the summit of Lada Rise and is conjectured to have contributed partly to the vast extent of Quetzalpetlatl Corona's massive lava flows. Boala corona is much different than its surrounding corona, with the smaller of the two that featuring a shallow depression surrounded by a gently sloping ridge, the opposite of Quetzalpetlatl Corona. The produced lava flows by the shield volcanoes at its base, as well as most flows observed on Venus to date, seem to preferentially produce pahoehoe-type flows, and the reasons behind this are still unclear.

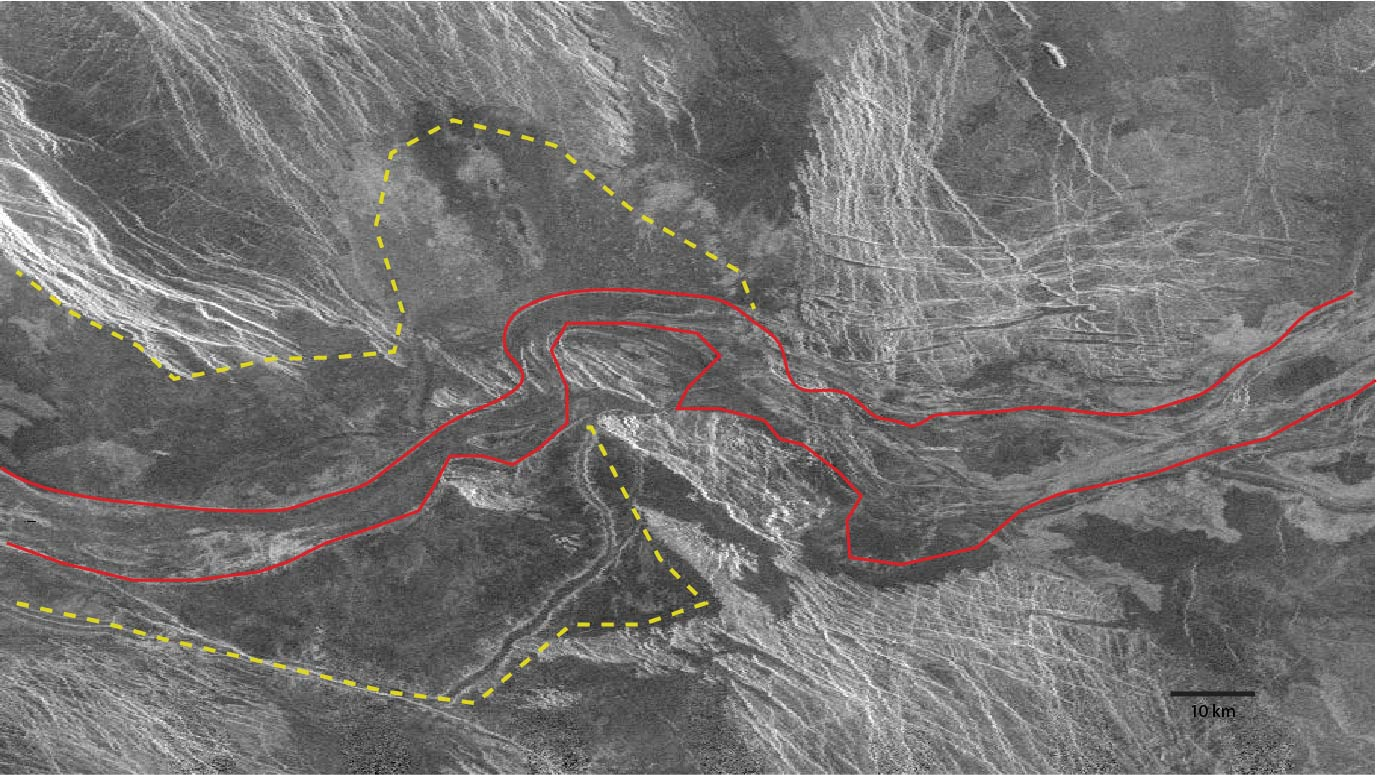
Outflow channels on Lada Terra, red outlines with youngest flow extent depicted as the yellow dashed lines. The channel is about 20 kilometers wide. Lada Terra, southern hemisphere of Venus. Background image provided by NASA/JPL

== See also ==
- Lada Terra
