= Wiehl (disambiguation) =

Wiehl is a municipality in North Rhine-Westphalia, Germany.

Wiehl may also refer to:

- Wiehl (Agger), a river in North Rhine-Westphalia, Germany
- Joe Wiehl (1910 – 1996), a professional American football player
- Lis Wiehl (born 1961), an American author and legal analyst
- Christopher Wiehl (born 1970), an American actor

== See also ==
- Wyhl
- Wil (disambiguation)
