= Wilen (disambiguation) =

Wilen is a town in the canton of Thurgau, Switzerland.

Wilen may also refer to:

== Places ==
- Wilen (Gottshaus), a hamlet of Hauptwil-Gottshaus in the Swiss canton of Thurgau
- Wilen (Herisau), a village in the municipality of Herisau in the Swiss canton of Appenzell Ausserrhoden
- Wilen (Illighausen), a part of Illighausen in the Swiss canton of Thurgau
- Wilen (Menzingen), a part of Menzingen in the Swiss canton of Zug
- Wilen (Vitznau), a part of Vitznau in the Swiss canton of Luzern
- Wilen (Walzenhausen), a hamlet of Walzenhausen in the Swiss canton of Appenzell Ausserrhoden
- Wilen bei Wollerau, a village in the Swiss canton of Schwyz

== Railway stations ==
- Wilen railway station, a railway station in Herisau in the Swiss canton of Appenzell Ausserrhoden
- Wilen bei Wollerau railway station, a railway station in Freienbach in the Swiss canton of Schwyz

== People ==
- Barney Wilen, a French musician
- Erik Wilén, a Finnish sprinter
- Jessica Wilen Berg, an American attorney and specialist in Public Health (MPH)
- Margareta Wilén (born 1938), from 1961 Steinby, Finnish archaeologist and professor
- Odette Wilen, a member of the United Kingdom's Special Operations Executive during World War II
- Tiina Wilén-Jäppinen, a Finnish politician

== See also ==
- Wil
- Wila
- Vilen
