= Wil (disambiguation) =

Wil is a Swiss city. Wil or WIL may also refer to:

== Other places in Switzerland ==
- Wil (Wahlkreis), a district which contains the city
- Wil, Aargau, a village
- Wil bei Koppigen, a former municipality in the canton of Bern
- Wil, Nidwalden, a settlement
- Wil, Zurich, a municipality

== Transportation ==
- West Island line of Hong Kong
- Wil railway station, a railway station in Wil in the Swiss canton of St. Gallen
- WIL, Amtrak code for Wilmington station (Delaware)
- WIL, National Rail code for Willington railway station, Derbyshire
- WIL, IATA code for Wilson Airport, Kenya
- WIL, station code for Williamstown railway station, Melbourne, Australia

== Radio stations ==
- WIL-FM, an FM radio station in St. Louis, Missouri
- KZQZ, an AM radio station in St. Louis, Missouri formerly known as WIL (AM)

== Acronyms ==
- Webel Informatics Limited, of West Bengal, India
- Western International League, a North American baseball league of the early 20th century
- Work integrated learning, a method of theoretical and practical learning
- Workers International League (disambiguation), several socialist organisations

== Other uses ==
- Will (given name), a list of people and fictional characters named Will or Wil
- FC Wil, a football club based in the city of Wil
- Wiltshire, county in England, Chapman code

== See also ==
- Wila (disambiguation)
- Wilen (disambiguation)
