= Lada (given name) =

Lada (Cyrillic: Лада) is a Slavic female given name. In Slavic mythology, Lada is the goddess of beauty, love and marriage. It may be related to the word lad (order), the Old Czech lada (girl, maid) or Serbian and Croatian mlada (bride). Pronounced lah-dah. Lada is also a shortened name for the Slavic names Ladislava, Vladislava and Władysława.

Lada is also a Polish, Czech surname.

== Name days ==
- Czech: 7 August
- Slovenian: 4 May or 27 June

== People ==
=== Lada ===
- Lada Adamic, American scientist
- Lada Chernova (born 1970), Russian javelin thrower
- Lada Dance (born 1966), Russian singer and actress
- Lada Engchawadechasilp, Thai American beauty pageant contestant
- Lada Galina (1934–2015), pen name of Ganka Slavova Karanfilova, a Bulgarian writer
- Lada Jelínková (born 1974), Czech actress
- Lada Jiyenbalanova (born 1970), Kazakhstani modern pentathlete
- Lada Kaštelan (born 1961), Croatian writer
- Lada Kozlíková (born 1979), Czech cyclist
- Lada Luzina (born 1972), Ukrainian author and journalist
- Lada Luzin (born 1972), Ukrainian Russian-language writer and journalist
- Lada Negrul (born 1967), Russian actress and poet
- Lada Nesterenko (born 1976), Ukrainian cross country skier
- Lada Pusch (born 2008), German rhythmic gymnast
- Lada St. Edmund (born 1947), American personal trainer and dancer
- Lada Zadonskaya (born 1986), Russian speed skater
- Lada Žigo (born 1970), Croatian writer

=== Ladislava ===
- Ladislava Bakanic (1924–2021), American gymnast
- Ladislava Kozderková (1949–1986), Czech actress
- Ladislava Něrgešová (born 1976), Czech actress

== Fictional characters ==
- Princess Lada from Princezna se zlatou hvězdou

== See also ==
- Ladislav, male form of Ladislava
- Ladas (disambiguation)
