= Lada (surname) =

Lada (Cyrillic: Лада) is the surname of the following people:

- Androniki Lada (born 1991), Cypriot discus thrower
- Anton Lada (1890–1944), American ragtime, jazz and dance musician and recording artist
- Elizabeth Lada, American astronomer
- Éric Lada (born 1965), French football player
- Jen Lada (born 1981), American sportscaster
- Josef Lada (1887–1957), Czech illustrator
- Oksana Lada (born 1976), Ukrainian actress
- Otakar Lada (1883–1956), Bohemian fencer
- Polly Lada-Mocarski (1902–1997), American bookbinder, inventor and rare book scholar

== See also ==
- Ladas (disambiguation)
