= Willa =

Willa is a feminine given name. Notable people and characters with the name include:

- Willa or Guilla of Provence (died before 924), early medieval Frankish queen
- Willa of Tuscany (died 970), queen consort of Berengar II of Italy
- Willa Brown (1906–1992), African-American pioneering aviator, lobbyist, teacher and civil rights activist
- Willa Cather (1873–1947), American novelist and writer
- Willa McGuire Cook (1928–2017), American three-time world and 18-time national water skiing champion
- Willa Wales Corbitt, American politician
- Willa Fitzgerald (born 1991), American actress
- Willa Ford, stage name of American singer, songwriter and actress Amanda Lee Williford (born 1981)
- Willa Holland (born 1991), American actress and model
- Willa Kim (Wullah Mei Ok Kim; 1917–2016), American costume designer for stage, dance and film
- Willa Muir (1890–1970), Scottish novelist, essayist and translator
- Willa O'Neill (born 1973), New Zealand actress
- Willa Beatrice Player (1909–2003), African-American educator, college president and civil rights activist
- Willa Shalit (born 1955), American sculptor, producer, photographer, author and activist
- Willa Schneberg (born 1952), American poet
- Willa Holt Wakefield (1870–1946), American vaudeville performer
- Willa, protagonist of the French-Canadian animated TV series Willa's Wild Life
- WILLA, the independent film production and distribution company

== See also ==
- Hurricane Willa, October 2018 Pacific storm
- Wila (disambiguation)
