= WILA =

WILA may refer to:

- WILA (defunct), a defunct radio station (92.1 FM) licensed to serve Woodstock, Illinois, which operated from 1948 until 1950.
- WILA (FM), a radio station (100.1 FM) licensed to serve Live Oak, Florida, United States.
- WWDN, a radio station (1580 AM) licensed to serve Danville, Virginia, United States, which held the call sign WILA from 1957 to 2009.
- Western Intercollegiate Lacrosse Association (WILA), a defunct NCAA lacrosse-only athletic conference.

== See also ==
- Wila (disambiguation)
