= Lada, Prešov District =

Village and municipality in Slovakia

Lada
- Municipality
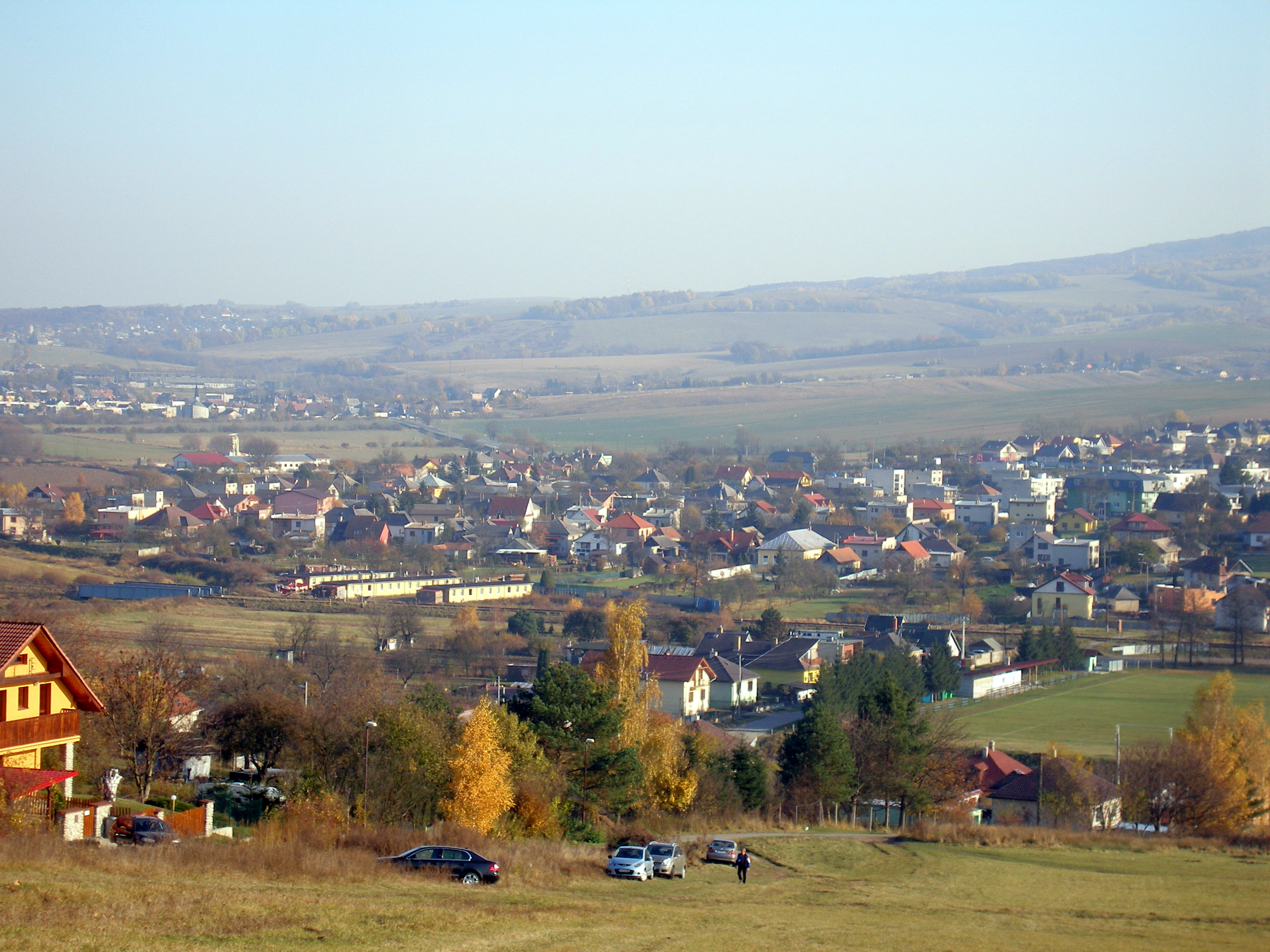

- Flag

- Location of Lada in the Prešov Region Location of Lada in Slovakia
- Coordinates: 49.05°N 21.37°E
- Country: Slovakia
- Region: Prešov Region
- District: Prešov District
- First mentioned: 1410

Area
  - Total: 3.09 km^{2} (1.19 sq mi)
- Elevation: 270 m (890 ft)

Population (2025)
  - Total: 842
- Time zone: UTC+1 (CET)
  - Summer (DST): UTC+2 (CEST)
- Postal code: 821 2
- Area code: +421 51
- Vehicle registration plate (until 2022): PO
- Website: www.obeclada.sk

Lada (Hungarian: Láda) is a village and municipality in Prešov District in the Prešov Region of eastern Slovakia.

== History ==
In historical records the village was first mentioned in 1410.

== Geography ==
The municipality lies at an altitude of 270 metres (890 ft) and covers an area of 3.09 km^{2} (1.19 sq mi) (2025).

== Population ==
Population statistic (10 years)
| Year | 1995 | 2005 | 2015 | 2025 |
|---|---|---|---|---|
| Count | 763 | 827 | 838 | 842 |
| Difference | | +8.38% | +1.33% | +0.47% |

Population statistic
| Year | 2024 | 2025 |
|---|---|---|
| Count | 837 | 842 |
| Difference | | +0.59% |

It has a population of 842 people (31 December 2025).

=== Ethnicity ===
Census 2021 (1+ %)
| Ethnicity | Number | Fraction |
|---|---|---|
| Slovak | 819 | 98.43% |
| Total | 832 | |

In year 2021 was 832 people by ethnicity 819 as Slovak, 6 as Not found out, 5 as Rusyn, 5 as Other, 3 as Czech, 2 as Ukrainian, 1 as Italian, 1 as Romani, 1 as German, 1 as French and 1 as English.

Note on population: The difference values of population numbers in the table "Population statistic" and in the sections "Ethnicity" & "Religion" is caused by the use of various statistical methods.

=== Religion ===
Census 2021 (1+ %)
| Religion | Number | Fraction |
|---|---|---|
| Roman Catholic Church | 363 | 43.63% |
| Evangelical Church | 331 | 39.78% |
| Greek Catholic Church | 59 | 7.09% |
| None | 48 | 5.77% |
| Ad hoc movements | 9 | 1.08% |
| Total | 832 | |

In year 2021 was 832 people by religion 363 from Roman Catholic Church, 331 from Evangelical Church, 59 from Greek Catholic Church, 48 from None, 9 from Ad hoc movements, 8 from Not found out, 4 from Jehovah's Witnesses, 4 from Hinduism, 3 from Calvinist Church, 1 from Eastern Orthodox Church, 1 from Paganism and natural spirituality and 1 from Seventh-day Adventist Church.
