= Quetzalpetlatl Corona =

Corona on Venus

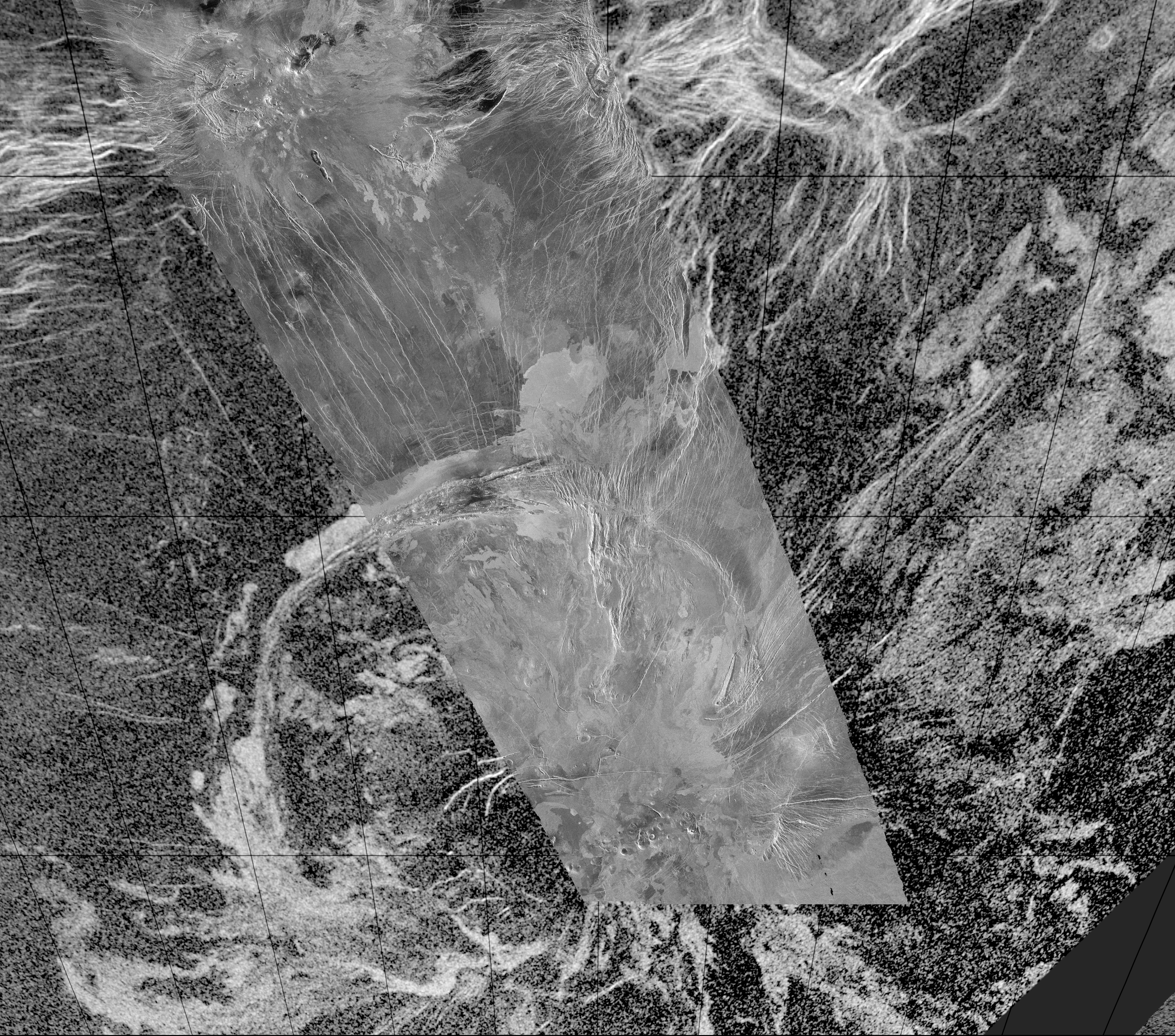
- Radar image of Venus centered on 65 degrees south, 359 degrees east and about 1,500 km × 1,500 km (930 mi × 930 mi) in extent. The large oval feature in the lower half of the image is Quetzalpetlatl Corona, approximately 700 km (430 mi) in diameter.
- Feature type: Corona
- Location: Lada Terra, Venus
- Coordinates: 68°S 357°E
- Diameter: 780 km
- Eponym: Quetzalpetlatl

Quetzalpetlatl Corona is a corona in Lada Terra on the planet Venus. Latitude 68° South, Longitude 357° East. It has a diameter of 780 kilometers, and is the 4th largest corona on Venus. It lies in part on the Lada Rise, with part of the corona intersecting the Ammavuro-Quetzalpetlatl belt in the northwestern region of Lada Terra.

It is named for Quetzalpetlatl, an Aztec fertility goddess. It was accepted by the IAU in the year 1991.

== See also ==
- List of coronae on Venus
