= Wanha Satama =

Coordinates: 60°09′55.9″N 024°58′03.1″E

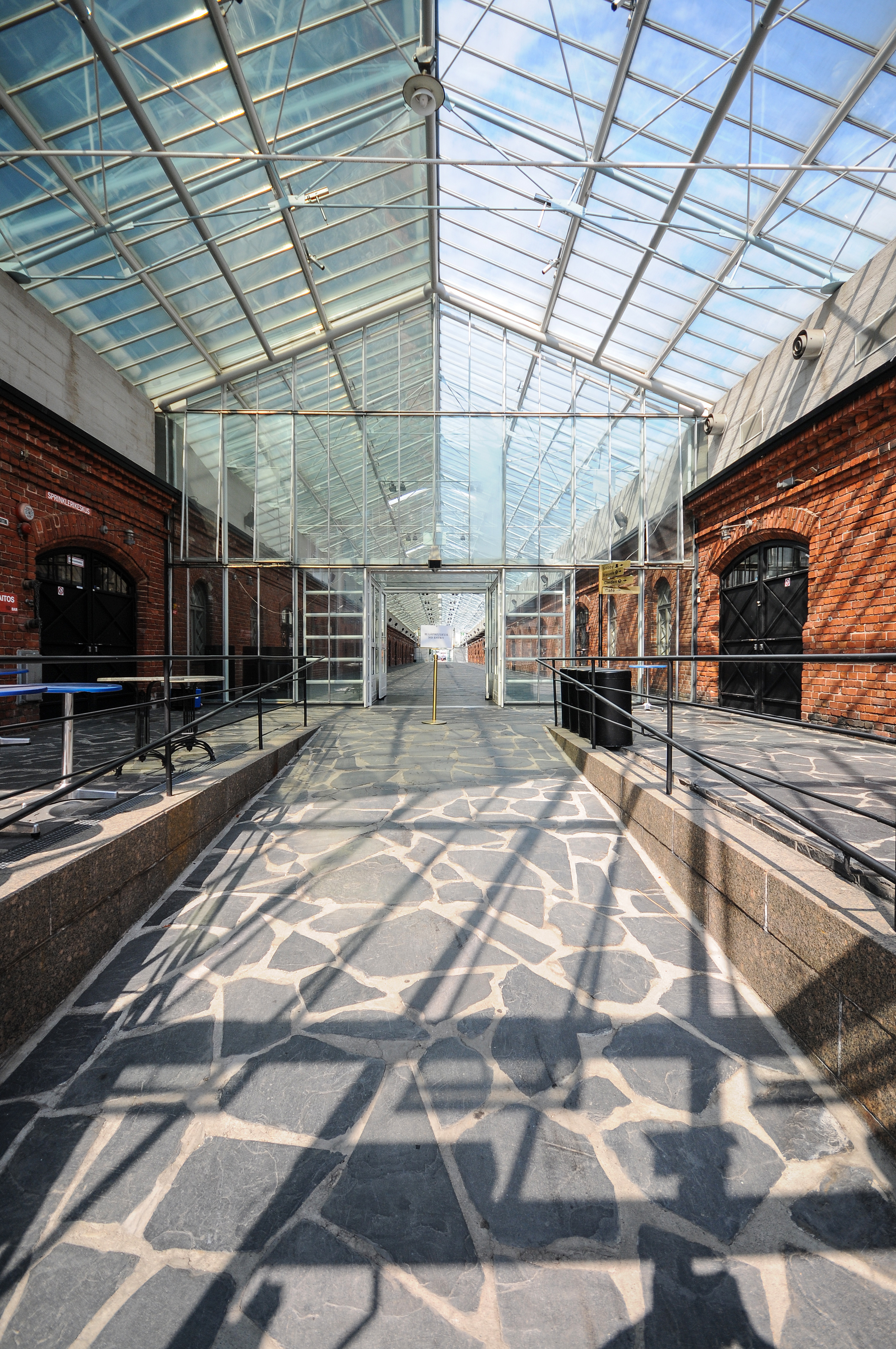
Wanha Satama

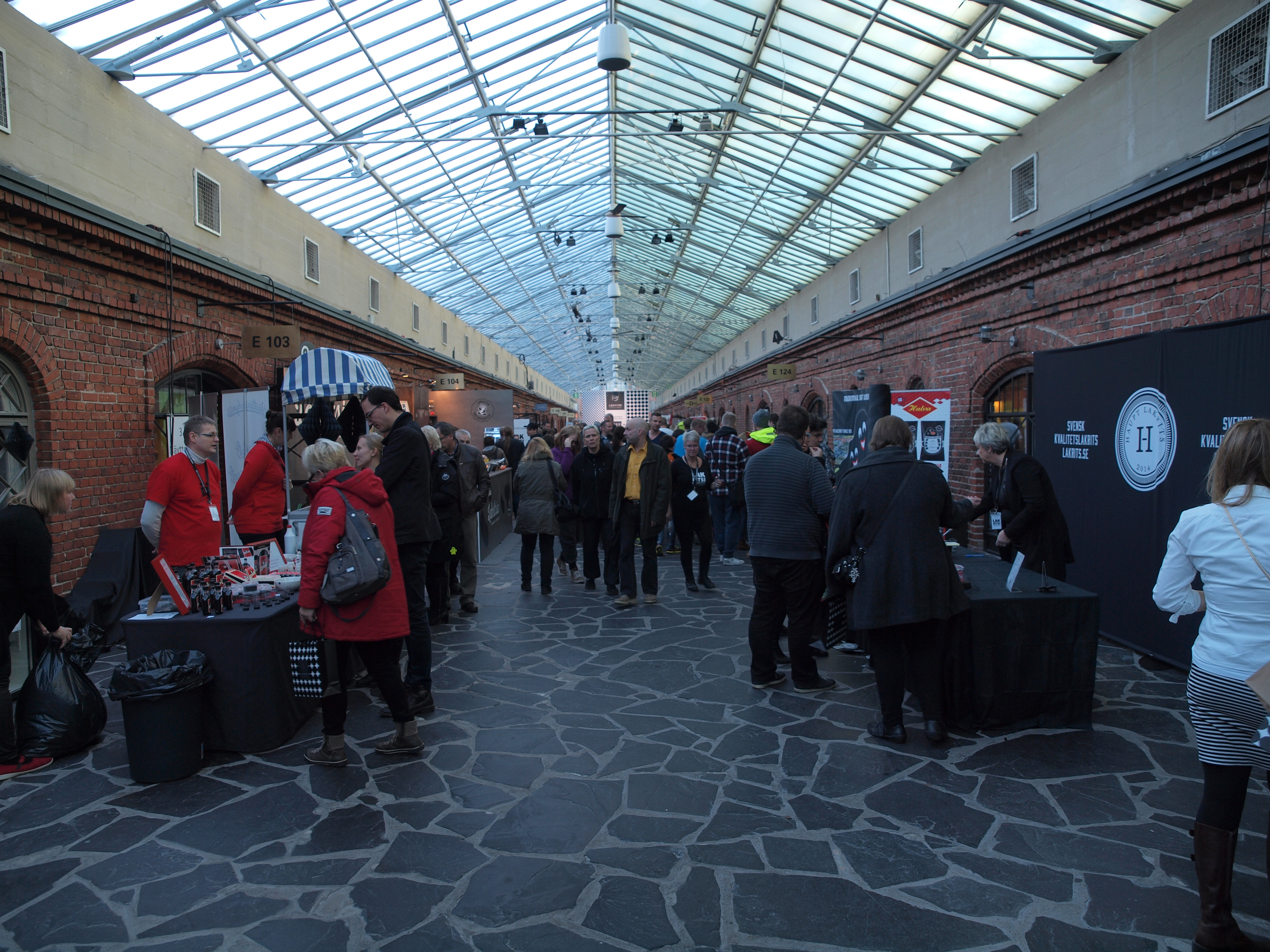
Interior of Wanha Satama

Wanha Satama (Finnish for "old harbour") is an exhibition centre in Helsinki, Finland.

== History ==
Wanha Satama is located in Katajanokka, a maritime district just east of the city centre. In Katajanokka, it is located very near the seaside and close to the Viking Line terminal. The Wanha Satama building is an old brick building originally dating back to the 19th century. It was renovated into an exhibition centre in the 1990s.
