= Lada Negrul =

Russian actress

Lada Negrul, (Russian: Лада Негруль, born April 18, 1967) is a Russian actress. She works in Moscow's "Russian House" theater and played main roles in ten Russian movies, including a TV serial "Dirty Work". She is the author and producer of documentaries about Irina Skobtseva, Sergei Bondarchuk, and Vladislav Galkin.

Negrul published four books of her poetry and a book about Alexander Men. She also performs sound poetry and songs by Alexander Galich and Vladimir Vysotsky.
