= Zhanna =

Zhanna is a given name, Russian form of Jeanne. Notable people with the name include:

- Zhanna Agalakova (born 1965), Russian journalist
- Zhanna Aguzarova (born 1962), Soviet and Russian singer
- Zhanna Bichevskaya (born 1944), prominent Russian bard and folk musician
- Zhanna Friske (1974–2015), Russian film actress, singer, and socialite
- Zhanna Pintusevich-Block (born 1972), sprinter who has competed in the Olympic Games
- Zhanna Prokhorenko (1940–2011), actress who starred in Grigori Chukhrai's 1959 film Ballad of a Soldier

== See also ==
- Zhanna, a play by Yaroslava Pulinovich, staged in 2014 with Ingeborga Dapkūnaitė in the title role
