= Lada Luzina =

Ukrainian author and former journalist

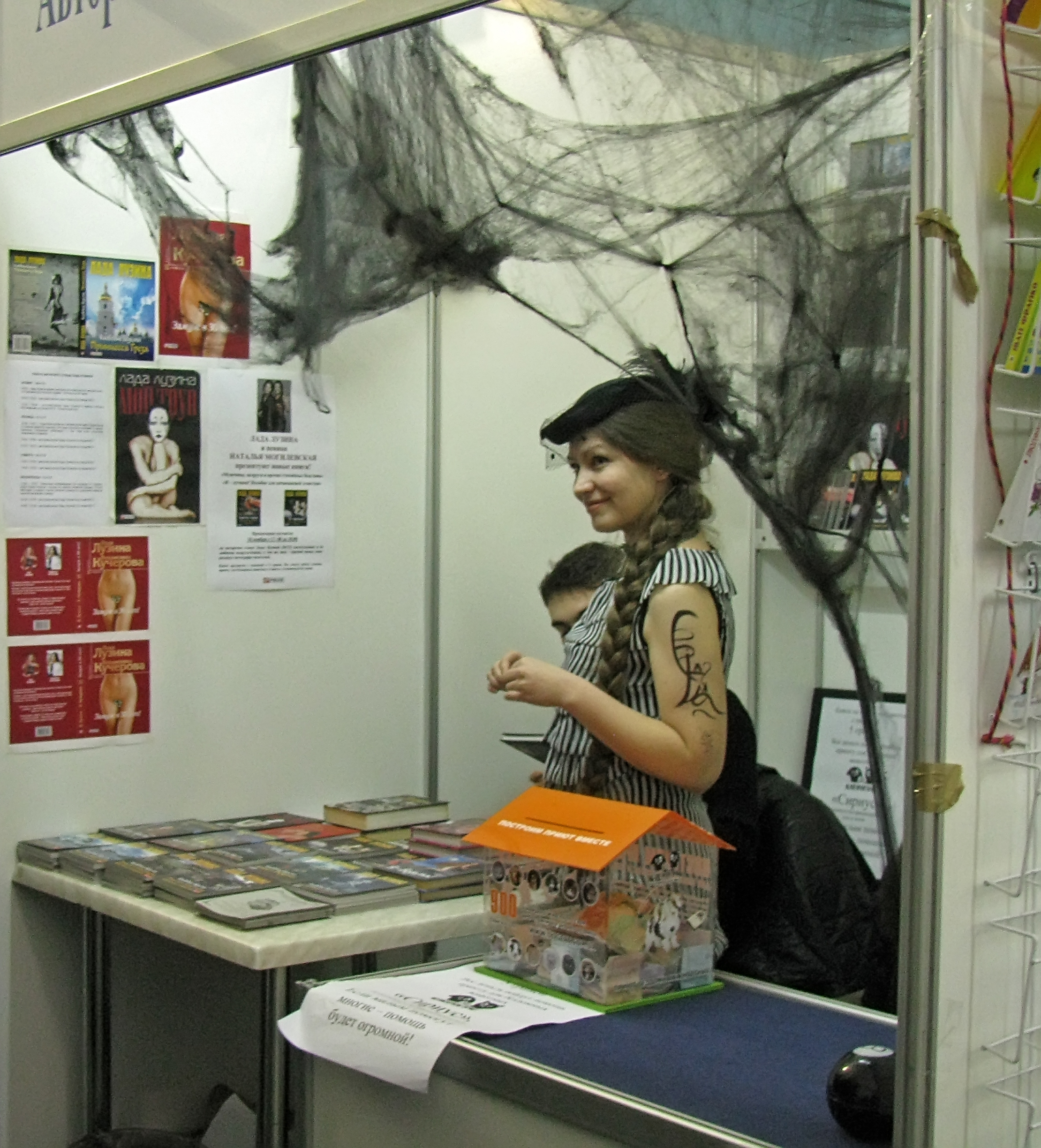
- Luzina at a book exhibition, Kiev, 2011
- Native name: Лада Лузіна
- Born: Vladislava Kucherova; October 21, 1972 (age 53) Kyiv, Ukrainian Soviet Socialist Republic

Vladislava Kucherova (Ukrainian: Владислава Кучерова; born 21 October 1972), better known by the pen name Lada Luzina (Ukrainian: Лада Лузіна), is a Ukrainian author and former journalist. Nicknamed the "Kyiv Witch", she writes novels in Russian within the crime and fantasy genres.

== Biography ==
Luzina was born on 21 October 1972 in Kyiv, Ukrainian Soviet Socialist Republic. Her parents divorced when she was four years old.

У мене золота мама, вона ніколи мені нічого не нав'язувала і не забороняла. Пізніше я зрозуміла те, що усвідомлювала в дитинстві інтуїтивно: батько міг би мене зламати. Мама ж виростила мене абсолютно вільною. Саме завдяки її виховання в мені сформувався головний життєвий принцип: у світі немає нічого неможливого! Всі правила і закони ілюзорні.

I have a golden mother, who never imposed or forbade me anything. Later, I realized what I knew intuitively as a child: my father could break me. My mother raised me completely free. It is thanks to her upbringing that the main principle of life has formed in me: nothing is impossible in the world! All rules and laws are illusory.

— Lada Luzina,

Eventually, she began to user her mother's maiden name, Luzina, as a pseudonym.

After the 8th grade, her mother took Luzina to an architectural school, the Vocational School No. 18, after which she worked in construction. She later entered the Faculty of Theater Criticism of the Kyiv Theater Institute. Starting her freshman year, her articles and poems began to be printed in various publications.

After leaving school, Luzina began her career as a tabloid journalist, which earned her the nickname "scandal journalist".

=== Writing ===
Luzina stories are mainly set in Kyiv, where she lives and works, and typically follow the urban fantasy genre. She began her book career in 2002, when she self-published her first book, My Lolita.

Initially planned as a trilogy, her "Witches of Kyiv" series began in 2005, when the book Sword and Cross was published. The series is of the crime and fantasy genre. Thematically, it focuses on questions around the cultural identity of Kyiv as it sits between Russia and Ukraine.

The publisher originally announced that the third and final book of the series, The Master's Recipe, was planned to be released in the fall of 2011. The first eight chapters of the book were uploaded onto Luzina's website, but by 2014, the book had still not been published. Instead, three different novels from the series were released in 2011.

In 2014, Luzina wrote a book titled Kak ja byla skandal'noj žurnalistkoj (How I was a Scandalous Journalist). Her 2020 urban fantasy book, Demons of Vladimirskaya Gorka, was based on Kyiv's historical plague and cholera epidemics.

== Personal views ==
=== Russia ===
Luzina has stated that Ukraine, Belarus and Russia all come from Kievan Rus', and has called Russia "Ukraine's daughter."

== Awards and honors ==
Luzina's book Shot at the Opera, the second in her "Witches of Kyiv" series, was awarded “Best Ukrainian Book” in 2008.

In 2010, Luzina was included in the list of "Top 10 most successful writers of Ukraine" according to Glavred magazine, which estimated the total book circulation of the writer sold in Ukraine between 1992 and 2010 to be about 250 thousand copies. In 2012, she was included in the ranking of the top 30 most successful writers of Ukraine, according to the magazine Focus. In 2012, the writer received the Golden Writers of Ukraine literary award.

== Selected bibliography ==
- My Lolita (Russian: Моя Лолита) — Kharkiv: Folio, 2002 — ISBN 966-03-2200-3
- I Am a Witch! (Russian: Я — ведьма!) —Kharkiv: Folio, 2003. — ISBN 966-03-1978-9
- How I was a Scandalous Journalist (Russian: Как я была скандальной журналисткой) — Kharkiv: Folio, 2004 — ISBN 966-03-2615-7
- Sex and the City of Kyiv (Russian: Секс и город Киев) — Kharkiv: Folio, 2004 — ISBN 978-966-03-4456-3
- My Corpse (Russian: Мой труп) — Kharkiv: Folio, 2009. — ISBN 978-966-03-4790-8
- Zhadan S. V. (Russian: Жадан С. В. Палата No.7) — Kharkiv: Folio, 2013.— ISBN 978-966-03-6387-8

=== "Kiev Witches" series ===
- Sword and Cross (Russian: Киевские ведьмы. Меч и Крест) — Kharkiv: Folio, 2005 — ISBN 966-03-2848-6
- Shot at the Opera (Russian: Киевские ведьмы. Выстрел в Опере) — Kharkiv: Folio, 2007 — ISBN 978-966-03-3946-0, 978-966-03-4321-4
- Save the Emperor!, Book 1 (Russian: Киевские ведьмы. Рецепт Мастера. Спасти Императора!) — Kharkiv: Folio, 2011 — ISBN 978-966-03-5720-4
- Master's Recipe. Save the Emperor!, Book 2 (Russian: Киевские ведьмы. Рецепт Мастера. Спасти Императора!) — Kharkiv: Folio, 2011 — ISBN 978-966-03-5721-1
- Dream Princess (Russian: Киевские ведьмы. Принцесса Греза.) — Kharkiv: Folio, 2011 — ISBN 978-966-03-5506-4
- Nikola Wet (Russian: Киевские ведьмы. Никола Мокрый) — Kharkiv: Folio, 2011 — ISBN 978-966-03-5534-7
- Angels of the Abyss (Russian: Киевские ведьмы. Ангел Бездны) — Kharkiv: Folio, 2011 — ISBN 978-966-03-5666-5
- Stone Guest (Russian: Киевские ведьмы. Каменная гостья) — Kharkiv: Folio, 2011 — ISBN 978-966-03-5669-6
- Ice Princess (Russian: Киевские ведьмы. Ледяная царевна) — Kharkiv: Folio, 2015 — ISBN 978-966-03-7079-1
- Shadow of the Demon (Russian: Киевские ведьмы. Тень Демона) — Kharkiv: Folio, 2016 — ISBN 978-966-03-7393-8
- Jack the Ripper from Khreshchatyk (Russian: Джек-потрошитель с Крещатика) — Kharkiv: Folio, 2018 — ISBN 978-966-03-8375-3
- Demons from Vladimirskaya Gorka (Russian: Бесы с Владимирской горки.) — Kharkiv: Folio, 2020 — ISBN 978-966-03-9077-5

=== Books about Ukraine ===
- Magical Kyiv (Russian: Киев волшебный) — Kharkiv: Folio, 2016 — ISBN 978-966-03-7659-5
- Legends of Kyiv (Russian: Легенды Киева) — Kharkiv: Folio, 2016 — ISBN 978-966-03-7657-1
- Wonders of Kyiv (Russian: Чудеса Киева) — Kharkiv: Folio, 2016 — ISBN 978-966-03-7658-8
- Increible Kyiv (Russian: Невероятный Киев) — Kharkiv: Folio, 2018 — ISBN 978-966-2536-35-5
- Ukrainian Women's Magic Traditions (Russian: Волшебные традиции украинок) — Kharkiv: Folio, 2018 — ISBN 978-966-03-8052-3; English version: Glagoslav Distribution, 2020 — ISBN 978-9-66-038957-1

=== Children's books ===
- Good Tales About Christmas Toys (Russian: Добрые сказки о ёлочных игрушках) — Kharkiv: Folio, 2012 — ISBN 978-966-03-6159-1
- Tale of the Light Bulb (Russian: Сказка о лампочке) — Kharkiv: Folio, 2013 — ISBN 978-966-03-6250-5
- The Story of the Christmas Tree (Russian: Сказка о новогодней ёлке)— Kharkiv: Folio, 2013 — ISBN 978-966-03-6251-2

== Screen adaptations ==
In 2007 and 2008, the Ukrainian and Russian films Masha and the Sea (Masha i more) were released based on the story of the same name from Luzina's book I am a witch!
