= Vilén =

Vilen or Vilén may refer to:

- Vilén (surname)
- Vilen (given name)
- 4514 Vilen, an asteroid

== See also ==
- Wilen (disambiguation)
