= Ladas =

Ladas can refer to:

== People ==
- Ladas of Argos, Greek runner, winner of dolichos at the Olympic Games 460 BC
- Ladas of Aegium, Greek runner, winner of the stadion race at the Olympic Games 280 BC
- Georgios Ladas (1913–1997), Cypriot politician
- Ioannis Ladas (1913–1997), a member of the Greek military junta of 1967–1974

== Other uses ==
- Ladas (automobile), an English car built in 1906
- Ladas (horse), winner of the 1894 Epsom Derby
- Ladas, Messenia, a village in Messenia, Greece
- L.A.D.A.S., a locomotive of the Snowdon Mountain Railway that was destroyed in an accident on the railway's opening day

== See also ==
- Lada (disambiguation)
