= Ninel =

Ninel is a given name. It is feminine in the former Soviet Union and masculine in Romania. In many Soviet cases, it is often considered to be derived from reversing the surname Lenin. It may refer to:

- Ninel Aladova (born 1934), Belarusian architect, theorist and educator
- Ninel Conde, Mexican singer, actress and television host
- Alena and Ninel Karpovich (born 1985), Belarusian twin sister musical duo
- Ninel Krutova (born 1926), Russian retired diver
- Ninel Kurgapkina (1929–2009), Russian dance teacher and former prima ballerina
- Ninel Lukanina (born 1937), Soviet Olympic volleyball player
- Ninel Miculescu (born 1985), Romanian weightlifting champion
- Ninel Petrova (died 2026), Soviet/Russian ballerina
- Ninel Shakhova (1935–2005), Russian television journalist
