= Ladas (automobile) =

The Ladas was an English automobile manufactured in 1906. It was named after the winning horse of the 1894 Derby.

James Bowen of Didsbury, Manchester, showed the single cylinder, 7 hp two-seater model at the February 1906 Manchester Motor Show. It was priced at £150, and it is unlikely that many more were made as Bowen sold the business in 1906 to a J.N. Aitken who from then on made Ladas bicycles and motorcycles.
