= Workers' International League =

Workers' International League may refer to:

- Workers' International League (1937) British Trotskyist Group
- Workers' International League (1985) British Trotskyist Group

See also the Workers Internationalist League and the International Workers League.
