= Vilén (surname) =

Vilén or Wilén and is a surname. Notable people with the surname include:

- Bo Wilén (1944–2023), Swedish diplomat
- Jari Vilén (born 1964), Finnish diplomat and politician
- Raimo Vilén (born 1945), Finnish sprinter
- Teuvo Vilen (born 1953), Finnish footballer
- Topias Vilén (born 2003), Finnish hockey player
