= Wila =

Wila may refer to:

- Wila (lichen)
- Wila, Missouri, a ghost town
- Wila, Switzerland, a municipality
  - Wila railway station
- Wila' language, the name of several extinct Malayan languages
- Polo Wila, an Ecuadorian footballer
- An alternate spelling of Vila (fairy), a Slavic fairy

== See also ==
- WILA (disambiguation)
- Willa (disambiguation)
