= Lada Terra =

Terra on Venus

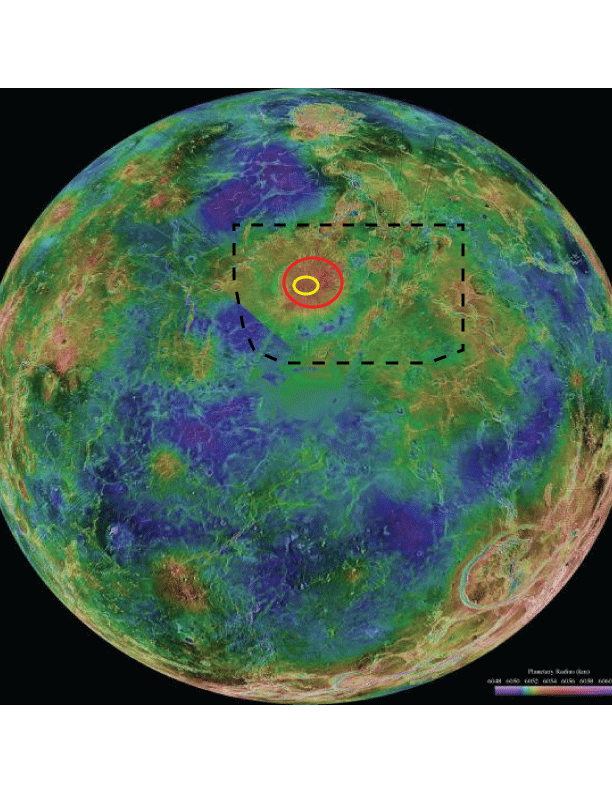
- A view of the southern hemisphere of Venus. V-56 Quadrangle bordered by the black dashed lines. The Quetzalpetlatl Corona is outlined in red and the inner Boala Corona in yellow. Background image provided by NASA/JPL.
- Feature type: Highland
- Coordinates: 60°S 20°E
- Diameter: 8,615 km
- Eponym: Lada

Lada Terra, named for a Slavic goddess of Love, is a major landmass near the south pole of Venus which is centered at 60°S and 20°E and has a diameter of 8,615 kilometres (5,353 mi). It is defined by the International Astronomical Union as one of the three "major landmasses," or terrae, of Venus. The term "landmass" is not analogous to the landmass on Earth, as there are no apparent oceans on Venus. The term here applies to a substantial portion of land that lies above the average planetary radius, and corresponds to highlands.

The broad region of Lada Terra contains massive coronae, rift zones, and volcanic plains as well as many other features that scientists use to attempt to piece together the history of this complex planet. The distinctive cross-cutting relationships found in the bedding of Lada Terra have been important in realizing relative ages of the extensional belts and coronae, as well as the complex tesserae features present planet-wide.

In 1990 the Venus Radar Mapper revealed the largest outflow channel system on the planet located in the northern region of Lada Terra. Although Lada Terra is generally considered a highland of Venus, the topography is much lower-lying than its northern counterparts Ishtar Terra and Aphrodite Terra.

Lada Terra is named after Lada, the Slavic goddess of love.

== Features ==
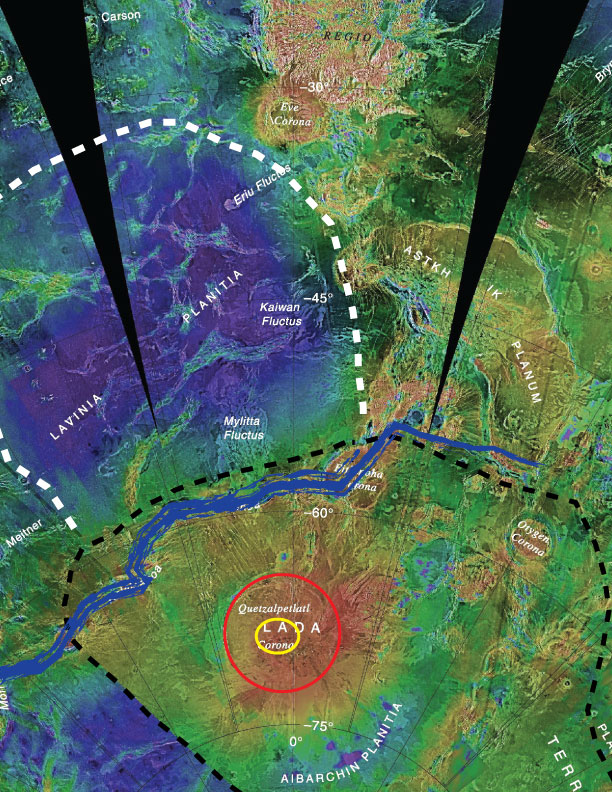
Expanded view of Lada Terra. Black dashed line bounds Lada Terra while the white encloses Lavinia Planitia. The Quetzalpetlatl Corona is in red and the Boala Corona in yellow. The Alpha-Lada belt is depicted as the jagged light blue line. Background image courtesy of NASA/JPL

Lada Terra is one of eight distinct regions on the surface of Venus. Ishtar Terra and Aphrodite Terra are the other significant terrae of the planet, located near the northern polar region and the equator, respectively.

Lada Terra has a diameter of 8,615 kilometres (5,353 mi) and covers most of the south pole region on Venus. The region consists of heavily deformed terrains indicating crustal deformation processes affecting the area in the past. The lowlands are much smoother terrain with very little deformation, which scientists postulate to be relatively young lava flow remnants. The most prominent region is the midlands, where gently sloping topography is disrupted by faults, fractures, and corona, making this area the most complex and studied region in Lada Terra.

=== Lada Rise ===
The western portion of Lada Terra contains a large dome-shaped structure about 2,000 kilometres (1,200 mi) across termed, "the Lada Rise," which is the main highland of the region. It reaches an elevation of about 3 kilometres (1.9 mi) and is dominated by one of the most massive corona in the Solar System, the Quetzalpetlatl Corona, as well as two massive rift zones surround and partially intersect the rise. The high rises of Venus generally fall into the corona-dominated or rift-dominated categories, but the Lada Rise is unique in that it contains both of these features in relatively equal amounts. In 2007, data retrieved from the Venus Express mission using the Visible and Infrared Thermal Imaging Spectrometer revealed high emissivity anomalies which is interpreted by many scientists to be a hotspot analogous to the Hawaii hot spot on Earth. This, along with the positive gravity anomaly observed, implies a recently active region. Further evidence is observed in the Boala Corona (which lies inside, and postdates the Quetzalpetlatl Corona), where the grabens formed in the depression of the Corona are interpreted to be surface manifestations of terrestrial dikes. The mantle upwelling associated with hot spot tectonism appears to be the dominant process which formed and evolved the Lada Rise.

==== Alpha-Lada Extensional Belt ====
A rift about 6,000 kilometres (3,700 mi) long and 200 kilometres (120 mi) wide, named the Alpha-Lada extensional belt, spans the northwestern edge of Lada Terra separating the relatively high lands of Lada Terra from the broad lowlands of Lavinia Planitia. The Lavinia Planitia basin is suspected to be an area of mantle downwelling, where there are less thermal stresses on the lithosphere. Because the nearby Lada Rise is speculated to be an area of mantle upwelling, models predict this could create a zone of weakness between these two convection cells which stretches the lithosphere, thus creating the rift zone. Associated with the rift zone are large lava flow fields and corona. The bedding relationships between the rift zone and these volcanic structures indicate they were formed about the same time, which many interpret as lava finding a preferential route to the surface through these newly formed fractures.

==== Ammavuro–Quetzalpetlatl Extensional Belt ====
A second rift, named the Ammavuro–Quetzalpetlatl extensional belt, is a 2,000 kilometres (1,200 mi) long and 300 kilometres (190 mi) wide rift which lies in the northeast region of Lada Terra. These two massive rifts intersect in the northern region of Lada Terra, and the observed deformation of the two extensional belts seems to have occurred at the same time, although the larger Alpha-Lada rift most likely continued to be deformed for a longer period.

=== Quetzalpetlatl Corona ===
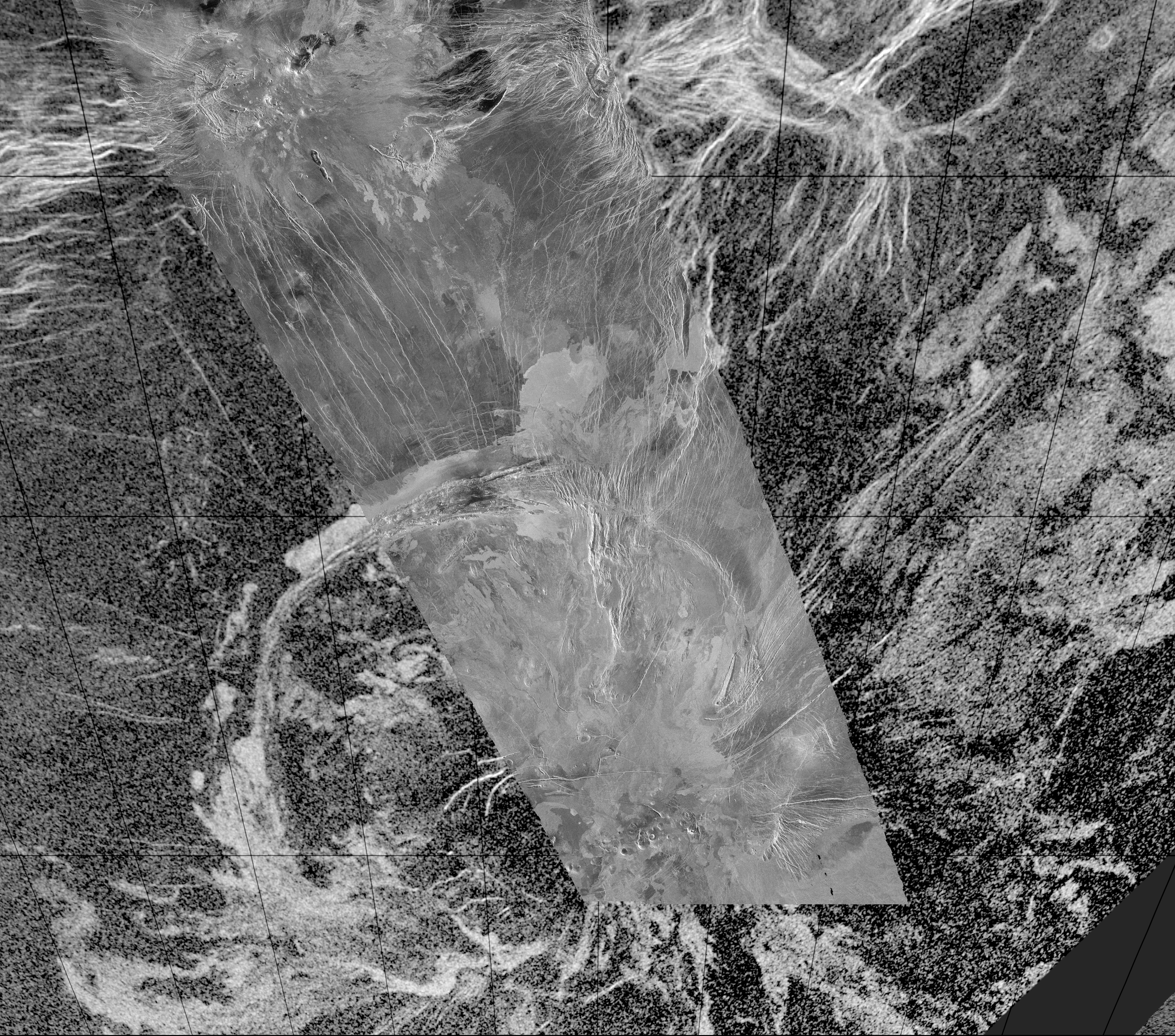
The large oval feature in the lower half of the image is Quetzalpetlatl Corona, approximately 700 km (430 mi) in diameter. Tectonic activity is largely observed in a relatively narrow rim region, which in this image is defined by a complex lineated terrain that surrounds much of the corona. Bright and dark volcanic flows are seen throughout the corona and surrounding terrain. Small shield volcanoes, 1–20 km (0.62–12.43 mi) in diameter, are seen near the southern limit. Narrow linear troughs (seen in the image as bright lines) trend to the north-northwest of Quetzalpetlatl.

Unlike most coronae on the planet, which are about 200 kilometres (120 mi) in diameter, Quetzalpetlatl Corona has a diameter of about 800 kilometres (500 mi). It is the third most massive corona after Artemis Corona and Heng-O Corona, and lies on the Lada Rise, with part of the corona intersecting the Ammavuro-Quetzalpetlatl belt in the northwestern region of Lada Terra. The corona consists of a raised inner region surrounded by the lower-lying "corona floor," with an elevated ridge about 1–2 kilometres (0.62–1.24 mi) above the corona floor, as well as an outer "moat" of depressed terrain which is 200–300 metres (660–980 ft) below the surrounding land. The corona is characterized by massive lava flows that cover almost 600,000 square kilometres (230,000 sq mi) of the Venusian surface, the largest lava flow extent seen on the planet to date. We can draw an analogue of this lava flow to a flow that occurred on earth, the Deccan Traps igneous province in India. Compared to other corona on Venus, Quetzalpetlatl Corona not only exhibits the most massive lava flow, but is also composed of lava of relatively homogeneous composition as revealed by the variations in brightness using radar backscatter imaging. This is in contrast with most coronae on Venus, which exhibit lava flows of a more heterogeneous nature. The latter are interpreted as lava flows originating from very distinct source(s).

==== Boala Corona ====
Quetzalpetlatl Corona contains within itself a younger, smaller corona named Boala Corona, which is situated at the summit of Lada Rise and is speculated to have contributed partly to the vast extent of Quetzalpetlatl Corona's massive lava flows. This corona is much different than its surrounding companion, with the smaller of the two featuring a shallow depression surrounded by a gently sloping ridge (the opposite of Quetzalpetlatl Corona). The lava flows produced by the shield volcanoes at its base, as well as most flows observed on Venus to date, seem to preferentially produce pahoehoe-type flows, and the reasons behind this are still unclear.

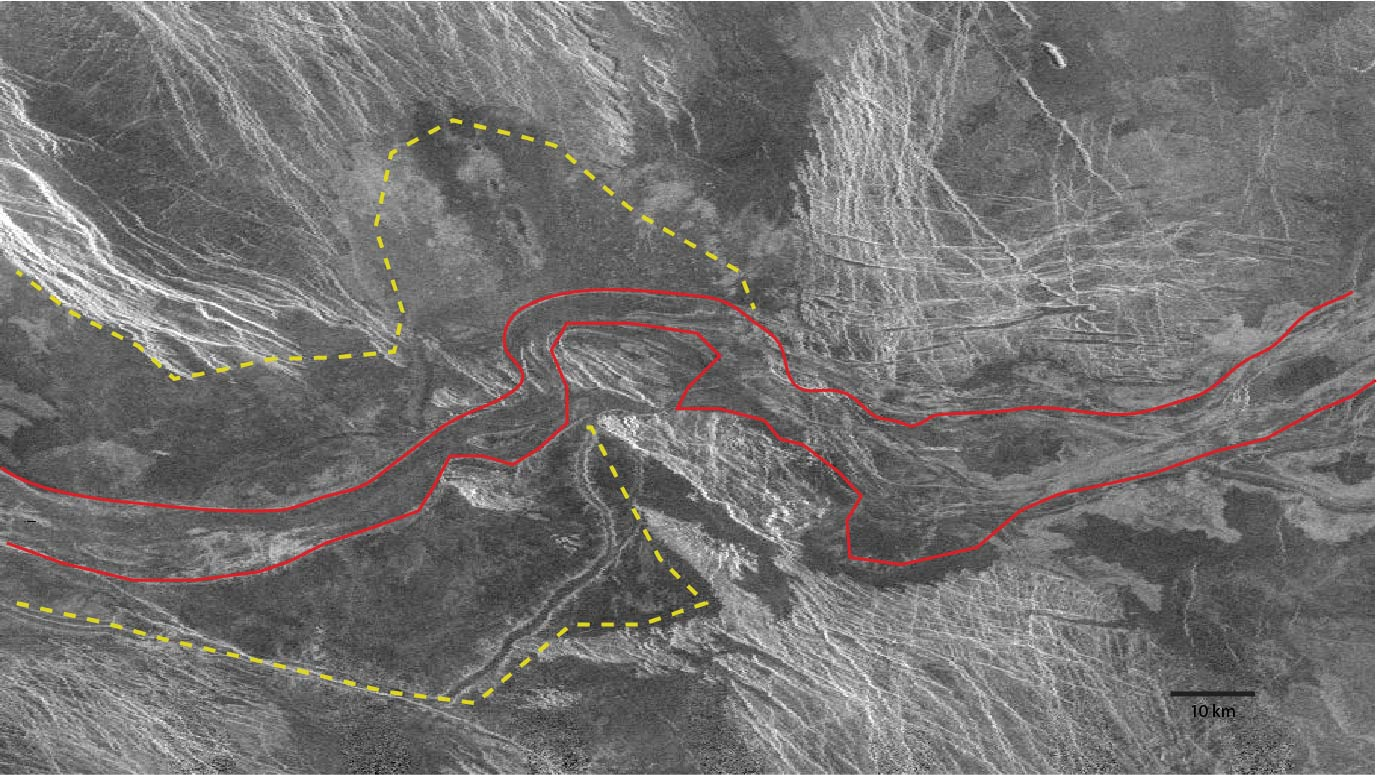
Outflow channels on Lada Terra, outlined in red with youngest flow extent depicted as the yellow dashed lines. The channel is about 20 kilometers wide. Lada Terra, southern hemisphere of Venus. Background image provided by NASA/JPL

== Stratigraphic relationships ==
Using crater counting methods, scientists have dated the surface of Venus to be between 300 and 800 million years old. This is very young when compared to a region on earth located in Canada where there are 4 billion year old rock outcrops. This, coupled with the unique and complex lava flows and corona, make relative age dating very difficult for scientists. However, using cross cutting relationships obtained from the radar data received from the missions to Venus has allowed scientists to draw complex correlations. The unique tessera terrain, which is interpreted to be a deformation product of the high regional stresses on Venus, is the oldest type of terrain found in the Lada Terra Region. The extensional belts and several corona, including the Quetzalpetlatl Corona, are observed to be cutting across the tessera terrain, implying these structures to be formed after this heavily deformed material. The extensional belts in some areas cross cut the corona whereas the corona embay the extensional belts in other areas, implying a coevolution of the two. As a result, shield volcanoes formed around the corona and began intense episodic volcanism, with the flows from these events now covering 48% of the Lada Terra region. These massive lava flows along with the suspected adjacent mantle upwelling slowly built and uplifted the Lada Rise some time after the initial formation of the Quetzalpetlatl Corona. This is indicated by the Quetzalpetlatl corona being offset with respect to the summit of the Lada Rise, or in other words, the corona is tilted at a different angle relative to the summit, implying the rock was tilted by the formation of the rise. Volcanism due to the formation of the Boala Corona (with its deposits cross cutting the previously mentioned structures) form the youngest lava flows observed and represents the latest episode of the evolution of the Lada Rise.

== See also ==
- Geography of Venus
- Aphrodite Terra
- Ishtar Terra
