= List of coronae on Venus =

This is a list of named coronae on Venus. With a few exceptions, cytherean coronae are named after fertility and earth goddesses.

== List of coronae on Venus ==
Name	Latitude	Longitude	Diameter (km)	Named after
A
Abundia Corona	18.5	125	250	Norse goddess of giving.
Achall Corona	−31.2	259.6	265	Celtic earth and nature goddess.
Acrea Corona	24.2	243.7	200	Greek resplendent mother goddess.
Aeracura Corona	−19	238.5	250	Celtic earth goddess.
Agraulos Corona	−27.7	165.8	170	Greek fertility goddess.
Ak-Ene Corona	9.4	254.7	150	Altay Great Mother, "White Mother." (Turkic mythology)
Allatu Corona	15.5	114	125	Akkadian earth goddess.
Ama Corona	−45.7	278.2	300	Jukun (Central Nigeria) goddess of childbirth, personification of earth.
Ambar-ona Corona	−70	82.5	550	Uzbek women's and fertility goddess.
Ament Corona	−67.2	217.9	115	Egyptian earth goddess.
Among Corona	−13.4	213.5	210	Karen(Burma/Myanmar) mythological first woman.
Anahit Corona	77.1	277.3	324	Armenian goddess of fertility.
Annapurna Corona	−35.5	152	300	Indian goddess of wealth.
Aramaiti Corona	−26.3	82	350	Persian fertility goddess.
Artemis Corona	−35	135	2,600	Greek moon and hunting goddess.
Aruru Corona	9	262	450	Sumerian earth goddess.
Ashnan Corona	50.2	357	300	Sumerian harvest goddess.
Asintmah Corona	25.9	208	150	Athabaskan (W. Canada Subarctic) Earth and nature goddess; the first woman on Earth.
Asomama Corona	23.3	21.6	180	Quechua potato goddess.
Aspasia Corona	56.1	189.1	200	Name changed from Aspasia Patera.
Atahensik Corona	−19	170	700	Huron/Iroquois goddess, creator of the sun and moon.
Atargatis Corona	−8	8.6	360	Hittite fertility goddess.
Atete Corona	−16	243.5	600	Oromo (Ethiopia) fertility goddess.
Atse Estsan Corona	8.5	92	150	Navajo fertility goddess.
Attabeira Corona	−1.5	211.5	240	Taino (Puerto Rico) fertility goddess.
Audhumla Corona	45.5	12	225	Norse primordial nourisher.
Azham Corona	66.4	252.7	380	Karachay/Balkar goddess
B
Bachue Corona	73.3	261.4	463	Chibcha (Colombia) goddess of fertility.
Baʽhet Corona	48.4	0.1	145	Baʽḥet, Egyptian personification of abundance. Formerly Ba'het Patera.
Banba Corona	−47.2	209.2	110	Irish earth goddess.
Bau Corona	52.8	259.3	355	Sumerian fertility goddess.
Beiwe Corona	52.6	306.5	600	Saami (Lapp) fertility goddess.
Belet-Ili Corona	6	20	300	Mesopotamian nature/fertility goddess.
Benten Corona	16	340	310	Japanese love/fertility goddess.
Benzozia Corona	27.5	204.5	185	Basque mother goddess.
Beruth Corona	−19	233.5	350	Phoenician earth goddess.
Beyla Corona	26.5	15.5	400	Norse earth goddess.
Bhumidevi Corona	−17.2	343.6	150	Hindu earth goddess.
Bhumiya Corona	15	118	100	Hindu earth goddess.
Bibi-Patma Corona	−47	302	450	Turkman goddess of women.
Bil Corona	3	168	225	Norse-Viking Earth and nature goddess.
Blai Corona	−0.4	134.5	125	Celtic fertility goddess.
Blathnat Corona	35	293.8	300	Celtic fertility goddess.
Blid Corona	−0.5	231.3	175	Scandinavian goddess of Earth, nature, and happiness.
Boala Corona	−70	359	220	Mongo-Nkundo (Bantu group, Zaire) the first woman, ancestor of people.
Boann Corona	27	136.5	300	Irish fertility goddess.
Bona Corona	−24	157.5	275	Roman virgin/fertility goddess.
Branwen Corona	27	35	320	British goddess of love.
C
Cailleach Corona	−48	88.3	125	Scottish Celtic fertility goddess.
Calakomana Corona	6.5	43.5	575	Pueblo Indian corn goddess.
Carpo Corona	−37.5	3	215	Greek fertility goddess.
Cassatt Corona	65.6	207.6	152	Mary Cassatt; American Impressionist painter (1844–1926). Formerly Cassatt Patera.
Cauteovan Corona	31.5	142.9	553	Kataba (Colombia) fertility goddess.
Cavell Corona	38.3	18.8	100	Edith Cavell; British nurse, heroine (1865–1915). (Formerly Cavell Patera.)
Ceres Corona	−16	151.5	675	Roman harvest goddess.
Cerridwen Corona	49.6	201.8	217	Celtic nature goddess.
Changko Corona	10.9	6.2	200	Kachin (Burma/Myanmar) mother of all humans.
Chantico Corona	−1.7	215	200	Aztec hearth goddess.
Chanume Corona	−29.2	245.5	330	Kachin (Tibetan people of Burma/Myanmar) creator goddess.
Chiun Corona	18.3	340.5	150	Hebrew fertility goddess.
Chuku Corona	−23.5	265.5	380	Igbo (Nigeria) creator goddess.
Clonia Corona	16	167.4	100	Greek Earth and nature goddess.
Coatlicue Corona	63.2	273	199	Aztec earth goddess.
Codidon Corona	−46	56	250	Arauakan (Colombia) great mother goddess.
Colijnsplaat Corona	−32	151	350	Teutonic fertility goddess.
Copia Corona	−42.5	75.5	500	Roman goddess of plenty.
Cybele Corona	−7.5	20.7	500	Phrygian fertility goddess.
D
Damona Corona	48.9	28	140	Gaulish fertility goddess, "Great Cow".
Demeter Corona	53.9	294.8	560	Greek goddess of fertility.
Demvamvit Corona	−65.5	38	370	Gurage (SW Ethiopia) women's goddess.
Deohako Corona	−67.5	118	300	Seneca Iroquois spirit of crops.
Derceto Corona	−46.8	20.2	200	Philistine fertility goddess.
Dhisana Corona	14.5	111.7	100	Vedic goddess of plenty.
Dhorani Corona	−8	243	200	Thai earth and love goddess.
Didilia Corona	19	38	320	E. Slavic childbirth goddess.
Dilga Corona	−18.7	250.4	220	Karadjeri (NW Australia) Earth goddess.
Disani Corona	2.7	57.5	300	Nuristan (NE Afghanistan) fertility goddess.
Dunne-Musun Corona	−60	85	630	Evenk (Tungu) earth and taiga mistress.
Dyamenyuo Corona	−57.5	42.5	200	Enets (Samoyed) women's and childbirth deity.
Dzuzdi Corona	35.2	20.6	80	W. Komi-Permyakan (Ural Finn) mythological ancestor of Zyuzdino tribes, Upper Kama River area.
E
Earhart Corona	70.1	136.2	414	Amelia Earhart; American aviator (1897–1937).
Edda Corona	47.2	25.4	50	Scandinavian goddess, "great grandmother", first woman to produce offspring.
Eigin Corona	−5	175	200	Celtic fertility goddess.
Eingana Corona	5	350	375	Australian aboriginal snake goddess, maker of all beings.
Eithinoha Corona	−57	7.5	500	Iroquois earth goddess.
Ekhe-Burkhan Corona	−50	40	600	Buryatian creator goddess.
Elihino Corona	-37	47.1	175	Cherokee Earth goddess
Emblae Corona	28.9	205.4	132	Scandinavian Earth goddess, creator of life.
Emegeljie Corona	−21.5	213.5	225	Mongolian childcare goddess.
Emegen Corona	37.5	290.5	180	Tuva (S. Siberia) childcare goddess.
Enekeler Corona	−46	264	350	Altay childbirth goddess.
Epona Corona	−28	208.5	225	Celtic horse/fertility goddess.
Ereshkigal Corona	21	84.5	320	Mesopotamian nature/fertility goddess.
Erigone Corona	−34.5	284	325	Greek harvest goddess.
Erkir Corona	−16.3	233.7	275	Armenian earth goddess.
Eurynome Corona	26.5	94.5	200	Greek mother earth goddess.
Eve Corona	−32	359.8	330	Hebrew first name; name changed from Eve (crater).
F
Fakahotu Corona	59.1	106.4	290	Tuamotu earth mother.
Fatua Corona	−16.3	17.7	400	Roman goddess of fertility.
Fefafa Corona	−24.8	210.8	100	Polynesian goddess of Earth, nature, and the life/death cycle.
Feronia Corona	68	281.7	360	Ancient Italian goddess of spring and flowers.
Flidais Corona	−24.5	177.3	150	Irish fertility goddess.
Fotla Corona	−58.5	163.5	150	Celtic fertility goddess.
Furachoga Corona	−38	258	550	Chibcha/Muiska earth goddess.
G
Gaia Corona	6	21.5	400	Greek earth/fertility goddess.
Gashan-Ki Corona	11.7	243.7	225	Babylonian "Lady of the Earth."
Gefjun Corona	−33.5	98.5	300	Norse fertility goddess.
Gertjon Corona	−30	276	250	Teutonic goddess of fertility.
H
Habonde Corona	3	81.8	125	Danish goddess of abundance.
Hannahannas Corona	0	170.5	200	Ḫannaḫanna, Hittite (Asia Minor) mother and insect goddess.
Haumea Corona	54	21.8	375	Polynesian fertility goddess.
Heng-o Corona	2	355	1,060	Named for Chinese moon goddess.
Hepat Corona	−2	145.5	150	Hittite mother goddess.
Heqet Corona	7	169.5	250	Heqet, Egyptian fertility goddess.
Hervor Corona	−25.5	269	250	Norse fertility goddess.
Hlineu Corona	−38.7	241	150	Chin/Kieng (Burma/Myanmar, Bangladesh) ancestor goddess.
Holde Corona	53.5	155.8	200	German fertility goddess.
Holla Corona	−13	237.7	180	German Earth, nature, and household affairs goddess.
Hulda Corona	12	308.3	230	German goddess of fruitfulness and marriage.
Húraru Corona	9	68	150	Pawnee húraaruʼ "earth, land"
I
Iang-Mdiye Corona	−47	86	300	Ede (Vietnam) goddess of rice.
Idem-Kuva Corona	25	358	230	Finno-Ugraic harvest spirit.
Ilmatar Corona	34.3	25	110	Finnish sky goddess, creator of the world.
Ilyana Corona	−69.5	65	300	Moldavian main female deity.
Inacho Corona	−20.5	212.2	125	Micronesian Earth and nature goddess.
Inanna Corona	−37	35.9	350	Semitic fertility goddess.
Inari Corona	−18	120.3	300	Japanese rice goddess.
Indrani Corona	−37.5	70.5	200	Hindu fertility goddess.
Isong Corona	12	49.2	540	Ibibio (Nigeria) fertility goddess.
Ituana Corona	19.5	153.5	220	Amazon River goddess, "Mother Scorpion", afterworld ruler.
Iweridd Corona	−21	310	500	Brythonic (English Celtic) earth goddess.
Ixcuina Corona	−47.5	207.5	150	Aztec earth and fertility goddess.
Iyatik Corona	−16.5	347.5	200	Iyatik， Keresan Pueblo (New Mexico) corn mother.
J
Jarina Corona	13	165	250	Brazilian Earth, tree, and happiness goddess.
Javine Corona	−5.5	251.2	450	Lithuanian harvest goddess.
Jord Corona	−58.5	349.5	130	Jord， Norse earth goddess.
Juksakka Corona	−19.5	44.5	320	Juksakka，Lapp goddess of birth.
Junkgowa Corona	37	257	280	Yolngu (Australia) fertility goddess.
K
Kaltash Corona	0.5	75	450	Mansi (Ob River Ugra) mother goddess.
Kamadhenu Corona	21	136.5	400	Hindu goddess of plenty.
Kamui-Huci Corona	−63.5	322.5	300	Ainu (Japan) earth goddess.
Kapenopfu Corona	−21.7	271	200	Angami-Naga (Burma/Myanmar) creator goddess.
Katieleo Corona	−12.5	327.5	210	Senufo (Burkina Faso) creator goddess.
Kayanu-Hime Corona	33.5	57	150	Shinto grain goddess.
Khabuchi Corona	−11	173	285	Avarian/Andalalan (Daghestan) childbirth deity.
Khotun Corona	−46.5	81.5	200	Yakut goddess of plenty.
Ki Corona	43.2	227.8	300	Sumerian earth goddess.
Kolias Corona	−16.5	207.9	200	Greek Earth, nature, and foothills goddess.
Kostromae Corona	40.6	7.6	230	E. Slavic female deity of spring and fertility.
Krumine Corona	−5	261.5	300	Lithuanian food goddess.
Kuan-Yin Corona	−4.3	10	310	Chinese fertility goddess.
Kubebe Corona	15.5	132.5	125	Hittite mother earth goddess.
Kulimina Corona	−27.8	261.9	170	Arawakan (Brazil, Venezuela) creator goddess who created women.
Kumang Corona	25	11.8	40	Mother goddess of Ibans, the Sea Dayaks of Borneo/Kalimantan, Indonesia.
Kunhild Corona	19.3	80.1	200	German fertility maiden.
L
Lalohonua Corona	−24	250.5	460	The first woman in Hawaiian mythology.
Latmikaik Corona	−64	123	500	Palau (Micronesia) fertility and childbirth goddess.
Latta Corona	−38.6	287	225	Chechen/Ingush (N. Caucasus, Russia) earth goddess.
Lengdin Corona	2.5	223	525	Chinese Earth goddess.
Libera Corona	12.5	24	350	Roman fertility goddess.
Lilwani Corona	−29.5	271.5	500	Hittite earth goddess.
Ludjatako Corona	−12.5	250.5	300	Creek (SE USA) Giant turtle deity. Name changed from Ludjatako Mons.
Lumimuut Corona	−11.5	234.5	230	Minahas (N. Sulavesi, Indonesia) ancestor goddess.
M
Ma Corona	−22.5	57	420	Fertility goddess from Asia Minor.
Maa-Ema Corona	40.8	102.5	300	Estonian harvest goddess.
Madalait Corona	37.6	206.4	150	Australian creator goddess; "Creator of life".
Madderakka Corona	9	315.5	220	Lapp goddess of birth.
Makh Corona	−48.7	85	200	Assyro-Babylonian goddess of fecundity.
Mama-Allpa Corona	−27	31	300	Peruvian harvest goddess.
Maram Corona	−7.5	221.5	600	Oromo (Ethiopia) fertility goddess.
Mari Corona	54	151	200	Cretan goddess of plenty.
Marzyana Corona	−53	67.5	550	West Slavic grain and fertility goddess.
Masateotl Corona	−53	244	180	Aztec goddess of love and fertility.
Maslenitsa Corona	77	202.5	0	Slavonic personification of fertility.
Mawu Corona	31.7	241.3	295	Fon (Benin) goddess of fertility.
Maya Corona	23	98	225	Hindu mother earth goddess.
Mayauel Corona	−27.5	154	200	Mexican goddess of plenty.
May-Enensi Corona	−42.5	68	330	Teleutan (S. Altay) fertility goddess.
Mesca Corona	27	342.6	190	Irish fertility goddess.
Metra Corona	26	97.7	101	Persian fertility/moon goddess.
Minona Corona	23.5	218.5	130	Benin (W. Africa) goddess who grants fertility to both women and the land.
Miralaidji Corona	−14	163.8	300	Aborigine fertility goddess.
Mirizir Corona	−66.4	185	70	Kassitan (Babylonia) earth and fertility goddess.
Miti Corona	−3.5	259.8	180	Koryak and Itelmen (Kamchatka) the Raven's (world creator) wife.
Modron Corona	32.8	23.1	50	Welsh divine mother goddess.
Momue Corona	−21	220.3	260	Darghinan (Daghestan) childbirth deity.
Moombi Corona	−64.5	235.5	100	Gikuyu (Kenya), the first woman, ancestor of nine tribes.
Mou-nyamy Corona	−49.5	59	200	Nganasan (Samoyed) lifebringing goddess.
Mukylchin Corona	−12.5	46	525	Udmurt (Urals Finn, Russia) fertility goddess.
Muzamuza Corona	65.6	205.4	163	Indian earth goddess.
Mykh-Imi Corona	−73	99	150	Khanty (Ob River Ugra) earth goddess.
N
Nabuzana Corona	−8.5	47	525	Ganda (Uganda) crop goddess.
Nagavonyi Corona	−18.5	259	190	Ganda (Uganda) crop goddess.
Nalwanga Corona	48.7	247	380	Ganda (Uganda) goddess of childbirth.
Nana-Bulukue Corona	39.4	14	230	Dahomean world creator deity, both male and female.
Nanen Corona	69.9	198.5	50	Brazilian Earth and nature goddess.
Nang Pao Corona	−47	204.5	160	Nang Pao, A South Laotian mythical ruler who called for rain, bringing fertility to the rice fields.
Naotsete Corona	−58.3	249.5	200	Keresan Pueblo ancestor goddess, mother of all foreign (non-Keresan) people.
Navolga Corona	−48.6	296.5	170	Ganda (Uganda) goddess of childbirth.
Ndoi Corona	−20.3	230.3	225	Mende (Sierra Leone) Earth and nature goddess.
Nefertiti Corona	35.9	48.2	371	Nefertiti Famously beautiful Egyptian queen (c. 1390-c. 1354 B.C.).
Nehalennia Corona	14	10	345	Teutonic fertility goddess.
Nei-Teukez Corona	14.2	258.8	90	Micronesian (Gilbert Islands, Kiribati) mother of gods.
Nepret Corona	52.7	6.8	303	Egyptian grain goddess.
Neyterkob Corona	49.7	204.7	211	Maasai earth/fertility goddess.
Nightingale Corona	63.6	129.5	471	Florence Nightingale; English nurse (1820–1910).
Nimba Corona	32.8	204.5	88	Guinea (West Africa) Earth and mother goddess.
Ninhursag Corona	−38	23.5	125	Babylonian earth goddess.
Ninkarraka Corona	65.3	221	150	Babylonian goddess of childbirth.
Ninmah Corona	16.5	49	700	Sumer-Akkadian mother goddess.
Nintu Corona	19.2	123.5	75	Akkadian earth goddess.
Nirmali Corona	−6.3	172.3	60	Nuristan (NE Afghanistan) childbirth goddess.
Nishtigri Corona	−24.5	72	275	Hindu earth mother.
Nissaba Corona	25.5	355.5	300	Mesopotamian wisdom/fertility goddess.
Nott Corona	−32.3	202	150	Scandinavian earth goddess.
Nungui Corona	−42.5	245.2	150	Hibaro (Peru/Ecuador) fertility goddess.
Nzambi Corona	−45	287.5	225	Congo (Bantu) ancestor goddess, mother of all beings.
Nzingha Corona	68.7	205.7	140	Nzingha queen, head of Amazon band (1582–1663). Name changed from Nzingha Patera.
O
Oanuavae Corona	−32.5	255.5	375	Gaulish Celtic earth goddess.
Obasi-Nsi Corona	−53.5	291	230	Ekoi (S. Nigeria) earth/fertility goddess.
Obiemi Corona	−31.9	276.6	300	Bini (Nigeria) childbirth goddess.
Obilukha Corona	−81.5	19	220	E. Slavic crop protection deity.
Oduduwa Corona	−11	211.5	150	Yoruba (Nigeria) fertility goddess.
Ohogetsu Corona	−27	85.7	175	Japanese food goddess.
Okhin-Tengri Corona	−70.5	40	400	Kalmykan fertility goddess.
Olwen Corona	37.5	67.5	175	Brythonic goddess of spring growth.
Omeciuatl Corona	16.5	119	175	Aztec generative power.
Omosi-Mama Corona	64.5	306	480	Manchoo childbirth goddess.
Onatah Corona	49	5.5	298	Iroquois corn spirit.
Onenhste Corona	−19	221.5	230	Mohawk/Iroquois corn maiden, the eldest of the Three Sisters, the harvest deities.
Ops Corona	68.8	89	183	Greek fertility goddess.
Orbona Corona	−47.8	293.2	150	Roman goddess of children, protects orphans.
Otau Corona	67.8	298.7	172	Bini (S. Nigeria) goddess of fertility.
Otygen Corona	−57	30.5	400	Mongolian earth mother. (Turkic mythology)
P
Pachamama Corona	−36	21.8	130	Incan earth goddess.
Pakoti Corona	-38.8	42.4	75	Maori plant goddess
Pani Corona	19.9	231.5	320	Maori fertility goddess.
Parma Corona	44.5	17.5	110	Komi-Permyakan (Ural Finn) personification of wilderness, in particular, of the North Ural taiga-covered uplands; mother of the first man, Pera.
Partula Corona	−49.7	289.2	145	Roman goddess of childbirth who determines the length of gestation.
Parvati Corona	−36	276.7	173	Hindu Earth and nature goddess, creator of life, primordial being.
Pasu-Ava Corona	29	319	250	Mari (Volga Finn) harvest goddess.
Pavlova Corona	14.5	40.0	440	Anna; Russian ballet dancer (1881–1931).
Pazar-ana Corona	−3.2	214.8	300	Gagauzan (Moldova) "Sunday mother", protector of women.
Perchta Corona	17	234.5	500	German fertility goddess.
Persephone Corona	−36	304.6	120	Greek underworld goddess, daughter of corn goddess Demeter.
Phra Naret Corona	−66.6	209.6	150	Thai fertility goddess.
Pölöznitsa Corona	0.5	302	675	Finno-Ugric grain goddess.
Pomona Corona	79.3	299.4	315	Roman goddess of fruits.
Ponmakya Corona	34.3	11.8	280	Burman (Myanmar) fertility goddess.
Prthivi Corona	10.8	248.5	375	Hindu (India) mother goddess.
Pugos Corona	−19	335	180	Khanty (Ob River Ugra) lifebringing goddess.
Purandhi Corona	26.1	343.5	170	Hindu goddess of plenty.
Q
Qakma Corona	35.5	207.1	130	Bella Coola/Nuxalk (SW Canada) creator of life, the first woman.
Qetesh Corona	−20.5	343.5	80	Egyptian fertility goddess.
Quetzalpetlatl Corona	−68	357	780	Aztec fertility goddess.
R
Rabzhima Corona	4.9	11	100	Tibetan great mother goddess.
Rananeida Corona	62.6	263.5	448	Saami-Lapp goddess of spring and fertility.
Rauni Corona	40.8	271.9	271	Finnish goddess of harvest, earth.
Renenti Corona	32.7	326.2	200	Renenti, Egyptian goddess of abundance.
Repa Corona	−13	218.8	240	Egyptian fertility and underworld goddess.
Rigatona Corona	−33.5	278.5	300	Celtic fertility goddess.
Rind Corona	8.2	247.5	140	Norse "Earth's Winter Queen," personification of the frost-covered Earth.
Romi-Kumi Corona	−81.2	180	150	Tukano (Colombia) great mother goddess.
Rosmerta Corona	0	124.5	300	Celtic fertility/luck goddess.
Rzhanitsa Corona	−17.6	214.6	450	Russian goddess of rye fields.
S
Samdzimari Corona	−11	339.5	260	Samdzimari was a Georgian fertility deity.
Samsing Corona	−23.8	229.5	165	Korean childcare deity, a good grandmother.
Sand Corona	41.7	15.5	181	George. (Aurore Dupin); French novelist (1804–1876). Name changed from Sand Patera.
Santa Corona	−34.5	288	200	Sabine goddess of fertility and health.
Sarpanitum Corona	−52.3	14.6	170	Babylonian fertility goddess.
Saunau Corona	−1.3	173	200	Abkhazian goddess of corn milling.
Schumann-Heink Corona	74.3	214.5	122	Ernestine; German singer (1861–1936). Name changed from Schumann-Heink Patera.
Seia Corona	−3	153	225	Roman grain goddess.
Seiusi Corona	−62	241	150	Tupi/Huarani (Bolivia) fertility goddess.
Selu Corona	−42.5	6	300	Cherokee corn goddess.
Semiramus Corona	−37	293	375	Assyrian fertility goddess.
Shiwanokia Corona	−42	279.8	500	Zuni fertility goddess.
Shulamite Corona	−38.8	284.3	275	Hebrew fertility goddess.
Shyv-Amashe Corona	−57	63	410	Chuvash (Volga Region) main water goddess.
Silvia Corona	12.6	355.7	270	Rhea Silvia a Roman earth goddess.
Simoting Corona	41.2	21.5	270	Naga (Tibetan people in NE India) ancestor of all people.
Sinlaku Corona	17.3	260.3	300	Micronesian (Kosrae Island, Caroline Islands) breadfruit tree goddess.
Sitapie Corona	−36.5	246.8	270	Indonesian earth, nature, and creator goddess.
Sith Corona	−10.2	176.5	350	Sif, the Norse harvest goddess.
Su-Anasy Corona	−78	39	300	Tartar/Kumyk/Karachay mother of water. (Turkic mythology)
Sulis Corona	44.3	14.2	136	British goddess of springs and healing waters.
Sunrta Corona	8.3	11.7	170	Hindu fertility goddess.
Sus-Khotin Corona	−54	241	110	Tajik and Uzbek fertility and rain goddess.
T
Tacoma Corona	−37	288	500	Earth goddess of Salish, Puyallup & Yakima Indians.
Tadaka Corona	−4	210.5	260	Indian Earth and nature goddess.
Tai Shan Corona	−32.5	95	175	Chinese fertility goddess.
Takus Mana Corona	−19.6	345.3	125	Hopi (USA) fertility goddess.
Tamfana Corona	−36.3	6	400	European-Norse fertility goddess.
Tamiyo Corona	−36	298.5	400	Japanese goddess of abundance.
Tangba Corona	−47	258	200	Lobi (Burkina Faso) earth goddess.
Taranga Corona	16.5	251.5	525	Polynesian fertility goddess.
Tari Pennu Corona	0.3	264.3	180	Khonds (India) Earth goddess.
Teteoinnan Corona	−38.5	149.5	125	Aztec fertility goddess.
Thermuthis Corona	−8	33	330	Egyptian fertility/harvest goddess.
Thouris Corona	−6.5	12.9	190	Egyptian fertility goddess .
Tituba Corona	42.4	214.7	163	Tituba, nurse who started Salem witch hunt (c. 1692). Name changed from Tituba Patera.
Tonatzin Corona	−53	164	400	Aztec earth and childbirth goddess.
Toyo-uke Corona	−62.5	41.5	300	Shinto fertility goddess.
Triglava Corona	−53.5	95	400	Triglava，Ancient Slavic earth goddess.
Trotula Corona	41.3	18.9	146	Trotula, an Italian physician (A.D. 1097). Name changed from Trotula Patera.
Tumas Corona	−16.3	351.2	200	Tumas，Hopi (USA) fertility goddess.
Tunehakwe Corona	−33.4	303.6	290	Tunehakwe，Onondaga/Iroquois deities of crops ("The Three Sisters").
Tureshmat Corona	−51.5	289.5	150	Ainu (Japan) creator goddess, created Hokkaido Island.
Tusholi Corona	69.5	101.2	350	Chechen and Ingush (Caucasus) goddess of fertility.
Tutelina Corona	29	348	180	Roman harvest goddess.
U
Ugatame Corona	−76.5	255	370	Kapauku (Papua/Melanesia) Great Mother goddess.
Ukemochi Corona	−39	296.1	300	Japanese fertility goddess.
Ulgen-ekhee Corona	−14.2	224	300	Buryatan Earth mother.
Umay-ene Corona	−27.5	50.5	370	Kazakh childcare goddess. (Turkic mythology)
Urash Corona	43.2	282	360	Sumerian-Akkadian earth goddess, wife of sky god Anu.
Utset Corona	−55.5	167	150	Zia (SW USA) the First Mother.
V
Vacuna Corona	60.4	96	448	Sabinian (Ancient Italy) goddess of harvest.
Vasudhara Corona	43.2	2.7	160	Buddhist female Bodhisattva of abundance.
Ved-Ava Corona	33	143	200	Mordovian (Volga Finn) water mother.
Verdandi Corona	−5.5	65.2	180	Norse bestower of blessings.
Vesuna Corona	−65.5	275	200	Italian (Umbrian) vegetation goddess.
W
Whatitiri Corona	−83	140	300	Maori ancestor goddess, great mother.
X
Xcacau Corona	−56	131	200	Quiche (Guatemala) cacao goddess.
Xcanil Corona	−37	43	200	Aztec and Quiche maiz goddess.
Xilonen Corona	51	321	300	Aztec maize (fertility) goddess.
Xmukane Corona	−28.2	269.5	200	Mayan mother and fertility goddess.
Xquiq Corona	38.1	14.6	55	Mayan fertility and motherhood divinity.
Y
Yanbike Corona	−1.5	328.5	200	Bashkir mythical first woman.
Yaroslavna Corona	38.8	21.2	112	Russian, wife of Price Igor; patiently waited for his return from captivity (12th century). Name changed from Yaroslavna Patera.
Ya-Yerv Corona	−9	214	275	Nenets (Samoyed) Earth mother.
Z
Zamin Corona	31.5	258.3	315	Persian earth goddess.
Zaramama Corona	−22	240.5	240	Quechua (Peru) maize deity.
Žemina Corona	-11.7	186	530	Lithuanian fertility goddess.
Zemire Corona	31.5	312.5	200	Kumyk (Daghestan) fertility goddess.
Zemlika Corona	−33.5	50	150	Latvian earth goddess.
Zhivana Corona	13	287.5	180	Slavic goddess of life.
Zisa Corona	12	221	850	German/Nordic harvest goddess.
Zywie Corona	−38.6	291.2	200	Polish goddess of life.

== See also ==
- List of craters on Venus
- List of geological features on Venus
- List of montes on Venus
