= Zisa Corona =

Corona on Venus

- Feature type: Corona
- Coordinates: 12°N 221°E
- Diameter: 850 km
- Eponym: Zisa

Zisa Corona is a corona located on the planet of Venus at latitude 12° north, longitude 221° east. It has a diameter of 850 kilometers, and is the 3rd largest corona on Venus.

It is named for Zisa, a German/Nordic harvest goddess and consort of Tyr. The name was accepted by the International Astronomical Union in 1994.

== See also ==
- List of coronae on Venus
- Artemis Corona - Largest corona on Venus
- Heng-o Corona - 2nd largest corona on Venus
