= Sand Corona =

Corona on Venus

- Feature type: Corona
- Diameter: 181 km
- Eponym: George. (Aurore Dupin); French novelist (1804–1876). Name changed from Sand Patera.

Sand Corona is a 181 km diameter corona and an arachnoid on the surface of Venus. It is part of the largest arachnoid group on Bereghinya planitia, located at the center of the group in the coordinates 41.7° N 15.5° E. It sits in a well-developed belt containing complex wrinkle edges that connects Trotula and Sand Coronae to the northwestern twin of Nana-Buluku Coronae.

Its name derives from the French novelist, George Sand. The name was accepted by the IAU in the year 2003. On Venus coronae are usually named after fertility and earth goddesses
