= Baʽhet Corona =

Corona on Venus

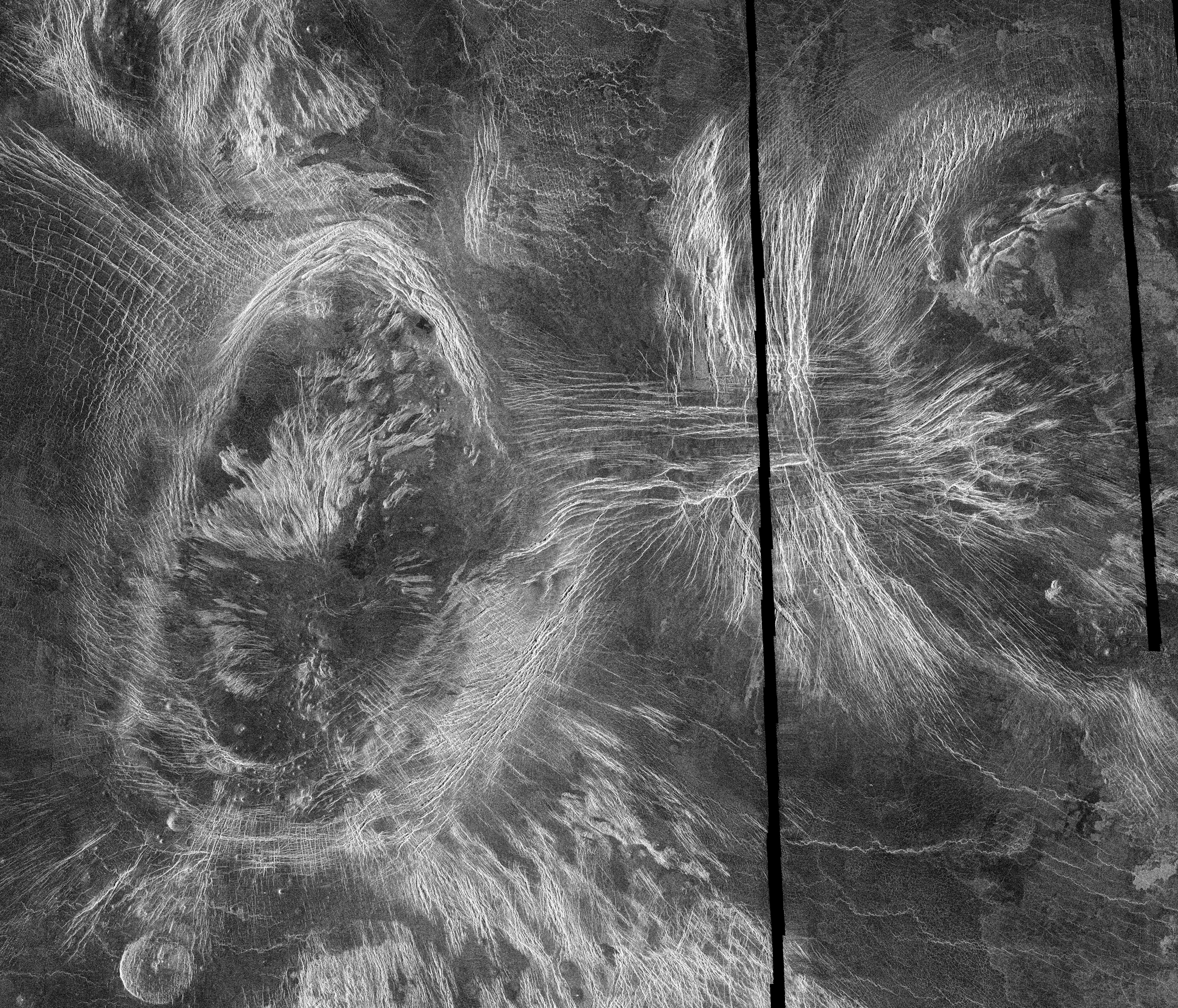
- Baʽhet is the structure on the left
- Feature type: Corona
- Coordinates: 48.4°N 0.1°E
- Diameter: 145 km
- Eponym: Personification of Egyptian baʽḥet (𓃀𓂝𓎛𓏏) "abundance"

Baʽhet Corona is a corona on the surface of Venus. About 230 kilometres (140 mi) long and 150 kilometres (93 mi) across, it is adjacent to Onatah Corona. Both features are surrounded by a ring of ridges and troughs, which in places cut more radially-oriented fractures. The centers of the features also contain radial fractures as well as volcanic domes and flows. Coronae are thought to form due to the upwelling of hot material from deep in the interior of Venus. The two coronae may have formed at the same time over a single upwelling, or may indicate movement of the upwelling or the upper layers of the planet to the west over time. A pancake dome, similar to low-relief domes see in the southern hemisphere, is located just to the southwest of Bahet.

Its name derives from the Egyptian personification of abundance, Baʽḥet, formerly Ba'het Patera. The name was accepted by the IAU in the year 1997.

== See also ==
- List of coronae on Venus
