= Guinevere Planitia =

Planitia on Venus

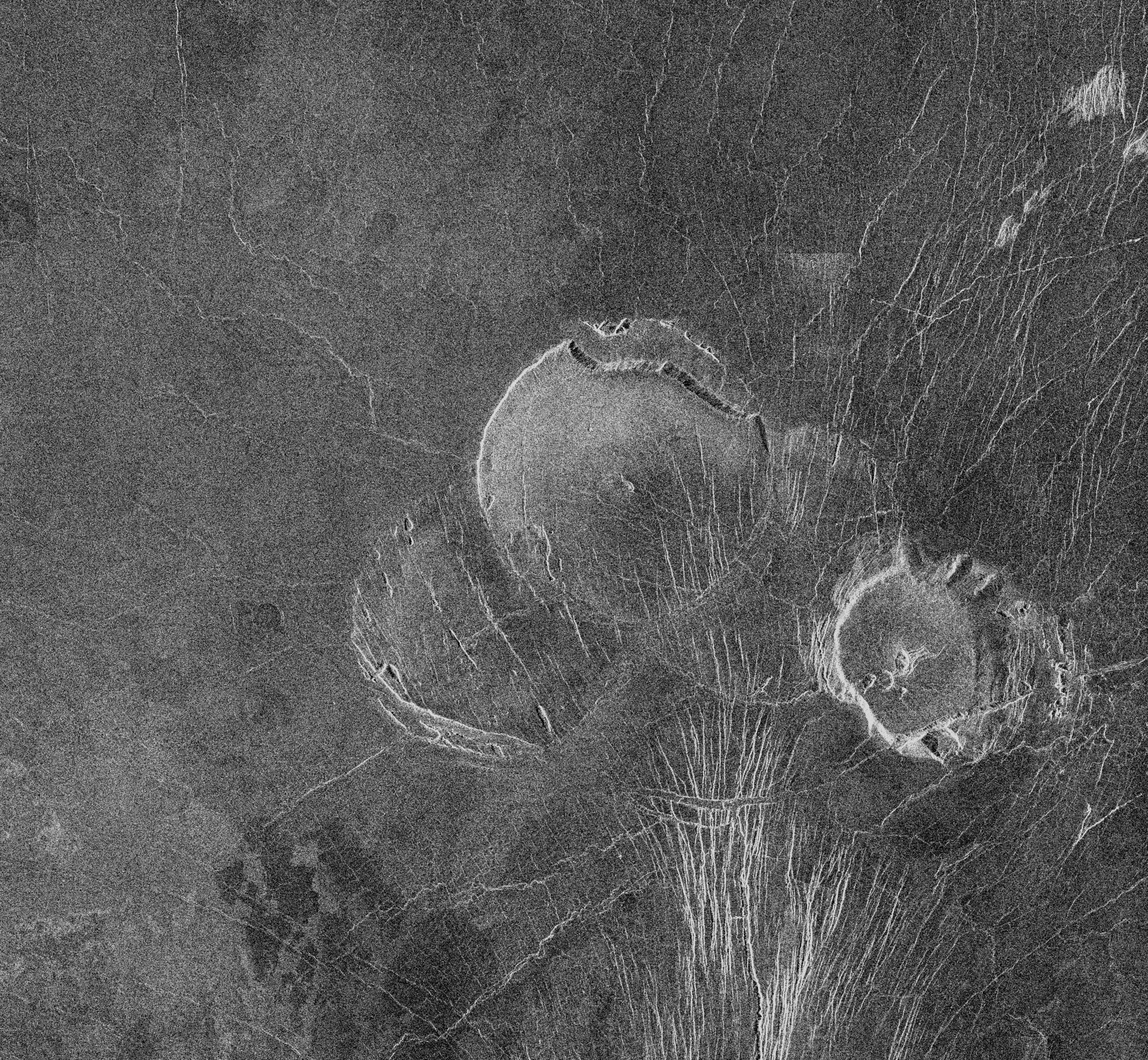
- View of pancake domes in lowlands
- Feature type: Terra
- Coordinates: 21.9°N 325°E
- Diameter: 7,520 km

Guinevere Planitia is an expansive lowland region of Venus that lies east of Beta Regio and west of Eistla Regio (quadrangle V-30). These low-lying plains, particularly in the western portion, are characterized by apparent volcanic source vents and broad regions of bright, dark, and mottled deposits. They are the only break in an equatorially connected zone of highlands and tectonic zones. The types, numbers, and patterns of mapped tectonic features and small volcanic landforms in the region provide important detail in the interpretation and evolution of venusian landscape.

By using Pioneer Venus, Goldstone, and Arecibo data, these regions have been interpreted as widespread superposed flows that originated from the source vents. Fracture zones and lineament belt segments that have been identified are said to represent the Beta-Eistla deformation zones of the region. Magellan SAR images have revealed that most of these surface units are composed of volcanic land forms. There is also Seymour crater that is associated with extensive crater outflow deposits.

== Overview ==
The region of Guinevere Planitia gives great insight to venusian tectonics and how the planet manages its heat. The nature of these structures also provides clues to the styles of volcanism, which is related to composition, volatile content, interaction with crust during magma movement, and the structure of the crust and lithosphere. By using geomorphic properties observed in the images taken, the terrain can be categorized into three types of geologic material: ridge terrain, plains materials, and volcanoes. There are crater materials locally that include ejecta, rim, and floor deposits from nine recognized craters. These structures also exhibit prominent outflow deposits.

== Ridge terrain ==
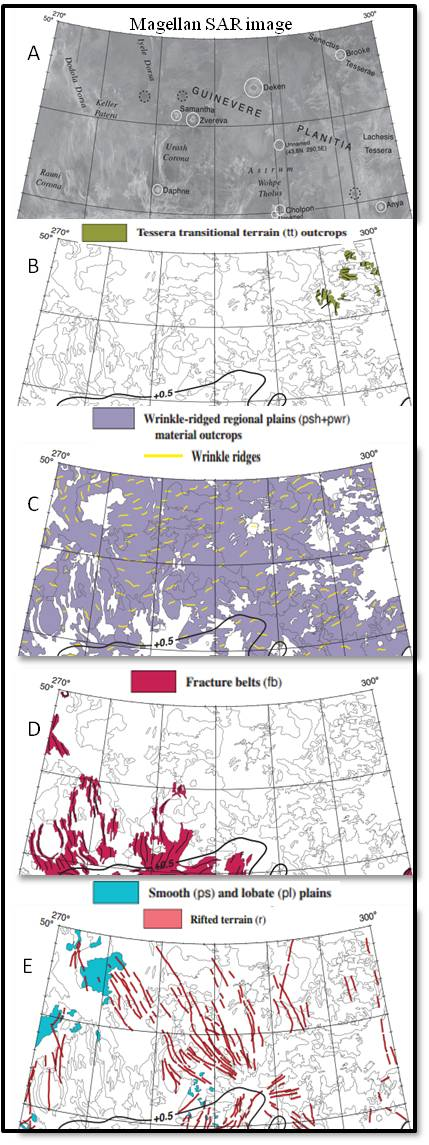
The terrain of Guinevere Planitia is, although seemingly flat, full of extensional tectonic structures.

Complex ridge terrain in Guinevere Planitia consists of embayed remnants of material that have undergone extensive deformation. Lineated materials contain one dominant orientation of tectonic features, and complexly lineated materials contain two or more tectonic fabrics. Ridge terrain includes the oldest materials found in this region and are often referred to as tessera. The ridge terrain is generally referred to as mottled, lineated plains which are generally large expanses of rolling topography that contain a small variety of volcanic domes, shields, cones, and flows. The mottled nature of the ridges is a result of ponding of flows and flow deposits in regions of low slopes.

== Regional plains ==
Structures primarily found in the plains of Guinevere Planitia consist of wrinkle ridges, fractures and lineaments. Lineaments exhibit one dominant orientation of tectonic features. Extending through the plains of Guinevere is a deformation zone that is made up of discontinuous segments of lineament belts and ovoids that are referred to as the Beta-Eistla deformation zone.

Other structural features are observed in coronae and coronae-like features as well as tesserae and other highly tectonized units. Within this region, structures exhibit a diversity of orientations and occur in sets of features with similar trends. Prominent east–west and southeast–northwest trends are locally observed in the regional plains. The figure to the left, beginning with A, shows a backscatter image of the northeastern region of Guinevere Planitia. Depicted in figure B, in the shaded regions are outcrops of tesserae which are concentrated on the eastern side of Beta Regio. Wrinkle ridges can be viewed as the purple fill in figure C. These outcrops dominate the low-lying region and are marked with yellow lines that represent major trends. Figure D shows the distribution of fracture belts and their trends in black. The likely cause of these trends is due to mantel upwelling at Beta Regio to the west. The trend of these figures can be directly related to radiating fractures and grabens, interpreted as underlying dyke swarms. The remainder of the systems are interpreted to be caused by tectonic stresses related to uplift or a combination of dyke and uplift mechanisms.

== Volcanology ==
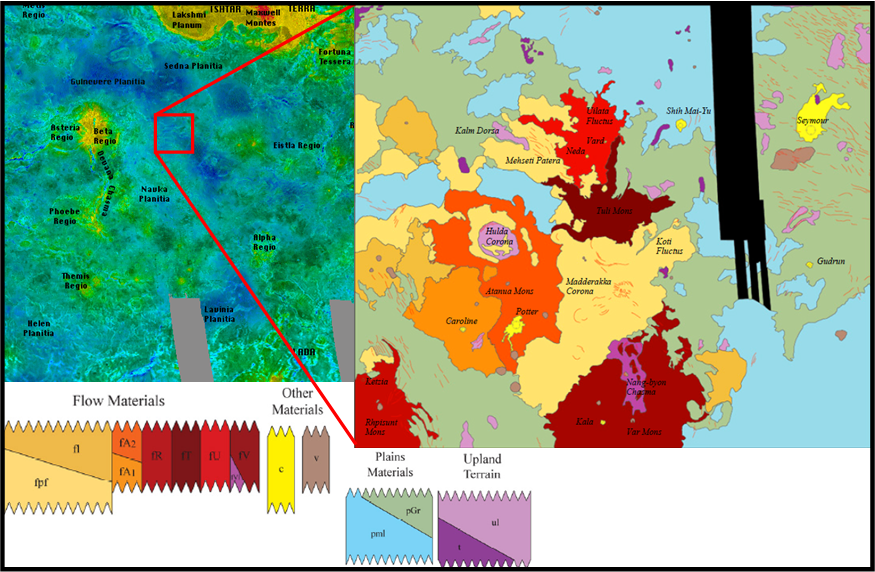
Map of the geology of southern Guinevere Planitia

Volcanism is one of the fundamental processes of heat transfer from planetary interiors. By assessing the location of volcanic deposits and edifices, their volumes, and their sequences provide evidence for quantitative assessment of heat transfer in space and time. The region contains three major volcanoes which have smaller volcanic constructs built upon their flanks and summit regions: Atanua, Rhpisunt, Tuli, and Var Mons, and three coronae: Hulda, Madderakka, and Pölöznitsa. Due to the amount of flows from these major eruptive centers, there is much obscurities among the deposits. Relative age relationships both within and between the major eruptive centers are difficult to determine due to the complex nature in which these flows coalesce and inter-finger. Each volcano appears to have had an extensive period of eruptive activity with several major phases creating large flow fields and more localized activity occurring both at vents on the flanks of the volcanoes and at their summits. Geologic mapping shows a general progression from upland terrain to volcanic plains and then to shield volcanoes and flow fields but also reveals a complex interplay between volcanic and tectonic processes.

=== Tuli Mons ===
Tuli Mons (13°N, 314.5°) is ~600×800 km across and contains a ~100×200 km field of low shields at its summit. Tuli rises an average of 600 m above its surroundings, and its flanks consist of a series of lobate, narrow flows which radiate from the summit region. Progressing north, large flow fields extend onto the plains and unite with a secondary eruptive center.

=== Atanua Mons ===
The westernmost volcano, Atanua Mons (9.5°N, 309°), is delineated by a cluster of small edifices and flows. At the summit, radial flows surround a small shield or cone with a central pit roughly 12 km in diameter. The flanks of this edifice (~1000 km across) are composed of lobate flows that extend in all direction from the summit. To the north of Atanua flows embay a corona, to the west is a fan-shaped flow field that covers the adjacent plain and may include some of the youngest deposits in the region, and to the south, flows embay a remnant of complexly deformed terrain.

=== Var Mons ===
Var Mons (1.5°N, 316°) lies in the southernmost portion of the plains and has a very complex summit region consisting of a shield field, a collapsed and embayed steep-sided dome, and a large, irregular dome. On the southern flank of Var Mons lies narrow, lobate flows which extend for ~500 km where they overlie dark, ridged plains. North of the summit extends a prominent rift zone that stretches a distance of 250 km where it terminates in a cluster of ring structures. The rift zone is embayed by summit flows. North of this rift zone, four more corona-like structures (~70–250 km in diameter) are partially embayed by flank flows and appear to be source regions for other flows on the plain as well.
