= Outline of Venus =

Overview of and topical guide to the second planet of the solar system

The following outline is provided as an overview of and topical guide to Venus:

Venus – second planet from the Sun, orbiting it every 224.7 Earth days. It has the longest rotation period (243 days) of any planet in the Solar System and rotates in the opposite direction to most other planets. It has no natural satellite. It is named after the Roman goddess of love and beauty. It is the second-brightest natural object in the night sky after the Moon, reaching an apparent magnitude of −4.6, bright enough to cast shadows. Because Venus orbits within Earth's orbit it is an inferior planet. Venus is a terrestrial planet and is sometimes called Earth's "sister planet" because of their similar size, mass, proximity to the Sun, and bulk composition. It is radically different from Earth in other respects. It has the densest atmosphere of the four terrestrial planets, consisting of more than 96% carbon dioxide. The atmospheric pressure at the planet's surface is 92 times that of Earth, or roughly the pressure found 900 m (3,000 ft) underwater on Earth.

== Classification of Venus ==
- Astronomical object
  - Gravitationally rounded object
    - Planet
      - Planet of the Solar System
        - Inferior planet
        - Inner planet
      - Terrestrial planet

== Location of Venus ==
- Milky Way Galaxy – barred spiral galaxy
  - Orion Arm – a spiral arm of the Milky Way
    - Solar System – the Sun and the objects that orbit it, including 8 planets, the planet second-closest to the Sun being Venus
      - Orbit of Venus

== Features of Venus ==
- Atmosphere of Venus
- Geology of Venus
  - Geological features on Venus
    - Arachnoid
    - Coronae on Venus
    - Craters on Venus
    - Montes on Venus
    - Terrae on Venus
  - Volcanism on Venus
- Orbit of Venus
- Quadrangles on Venus

== History of Venus ==
History of Venus

=== Exploration of Venus ===
- Observations and explorations of Venus
- Artificial objects on Venus

==== Flybys and direct missions to explore Venus ====
- Venera
- Venera 1
- Venera 2
- Venera 3
- Venera 4
- Venera 5
- Venera 6
- Venera 7
- Venera 8
- Venera 9
- Venera 10
- Venera 11
- Venera 12
- Venera 13
- Venera 14
- Venera 15
- Venera 16
- Mariner program
- Mariner 2
- Mariner 5
- Mariner 10
- Zond program
- Zond 1
- Pioneer Venus project
- Vega program
- Vega 1
- Vega 2
- Galileo spacecraft
- Magellan spacecraft
- Cassini–Huygens
- Venus Express
- MESSENGER
- Akatsuki spacecraft
- IKAROS
- Shin'en

==== Cancelled missions to explore Venus ====
- TMK
- Manned Venus Flyby

== Future of Venus exploration ==
- Colonization of Venus
- Terraforming of Venus

=== Proposed missions to explore Venus ===
- Venera-D
- Venus In-Situ Explorer
- Venus Entry Probe
- Shukrayaan-1

== Venus in popular culture ==
- Venus in fiction
  - Venusians

== See also ==
- Outline of astronomy
  - Outline of the Solar System
- Outline of space exploration
- Ashen light
- Cytherean
- Hesperus
- Neith
