= Nott Corona =

Corona on Venus

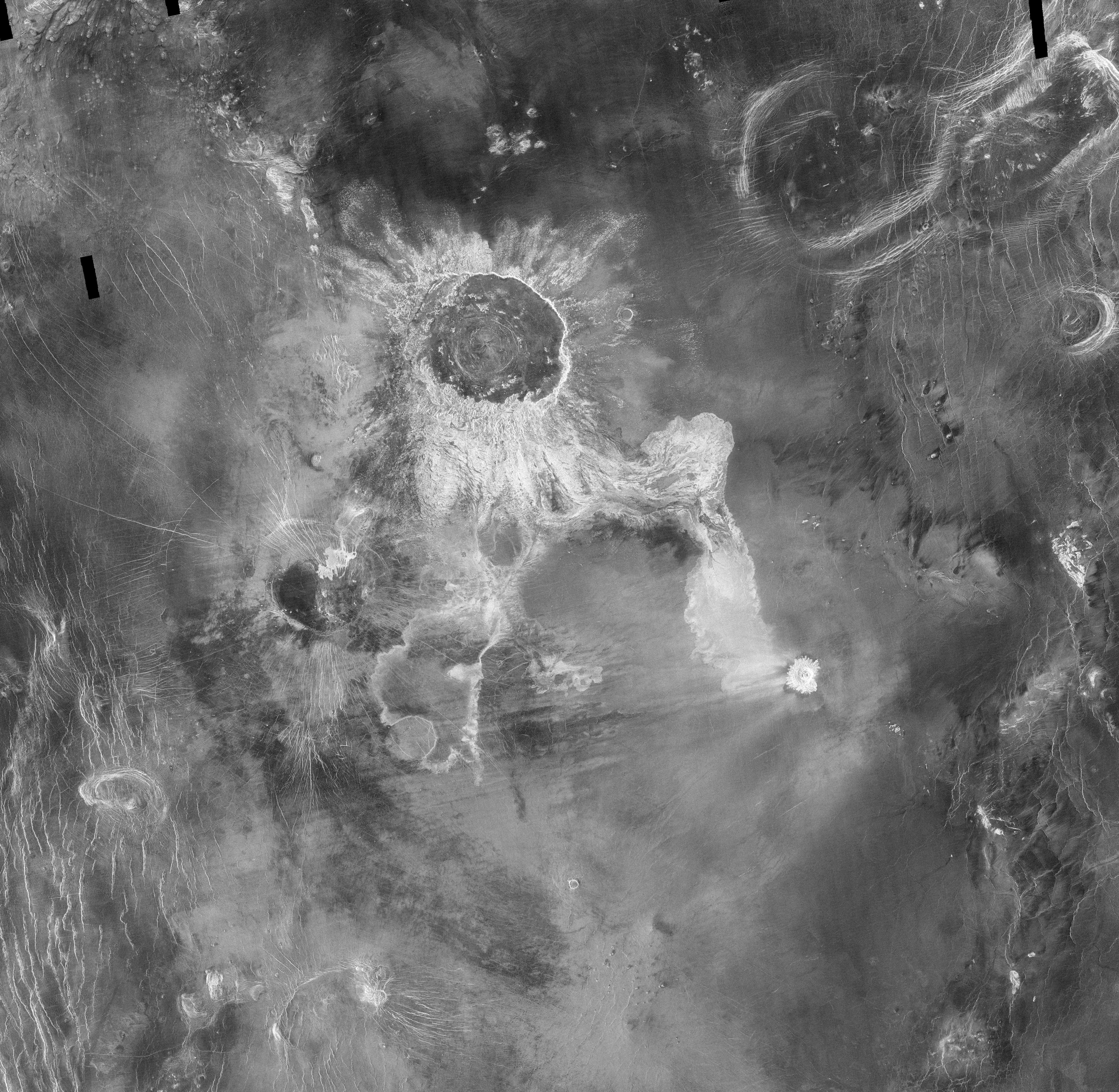
- Nott Corona is located southwest of Isabella crater (in the middle) on this image.
- Feature type: Corona
- Coordinates: 32.3°N 202°E
- Diameter: 150 km
- Eponym: Nótt

Nott Corona is a corona, a geological formation in the shape of a crown, located on the planet Venus at -32.3° N and 202° E. It is located in the Isabella quadrangle. It is named after Nótt, the Scandinavian goddess of the Earth.

== Geography and geology ==
Nott Corona covers a circular area about 150 km in diameter.

== See also ==
- List of coronae on Venus
