= Ninmah Corona =

Corona on Venus

Pavlova Corona
- Feature type: Corona
- Coordinates: 16.5°N 49°E
- Diameter: 700 km
- Eponym: Ninmah

Ninmah Corona is a corona found on the planet Venus, at 16.5°N 49°E Mead Quadrangle. It is named after Ninmah, a Sumer-Akkadian mother goddess.

== Geography and geology ==
Ninmah Corona covers a circular area of around 700 km in diameter. Ninmah Corona is one of the four major coronae of eastern Eistla Regio (Didilia, Pavlova, Ninmah, and Isong). These coronae have relatively similar structure: an uplifted concentric feature with a central dome and surrounded by a relatively flat interior floor.

== See also ==
- List of coronae on Venus
