= Minona Corona =

Corona on Venus

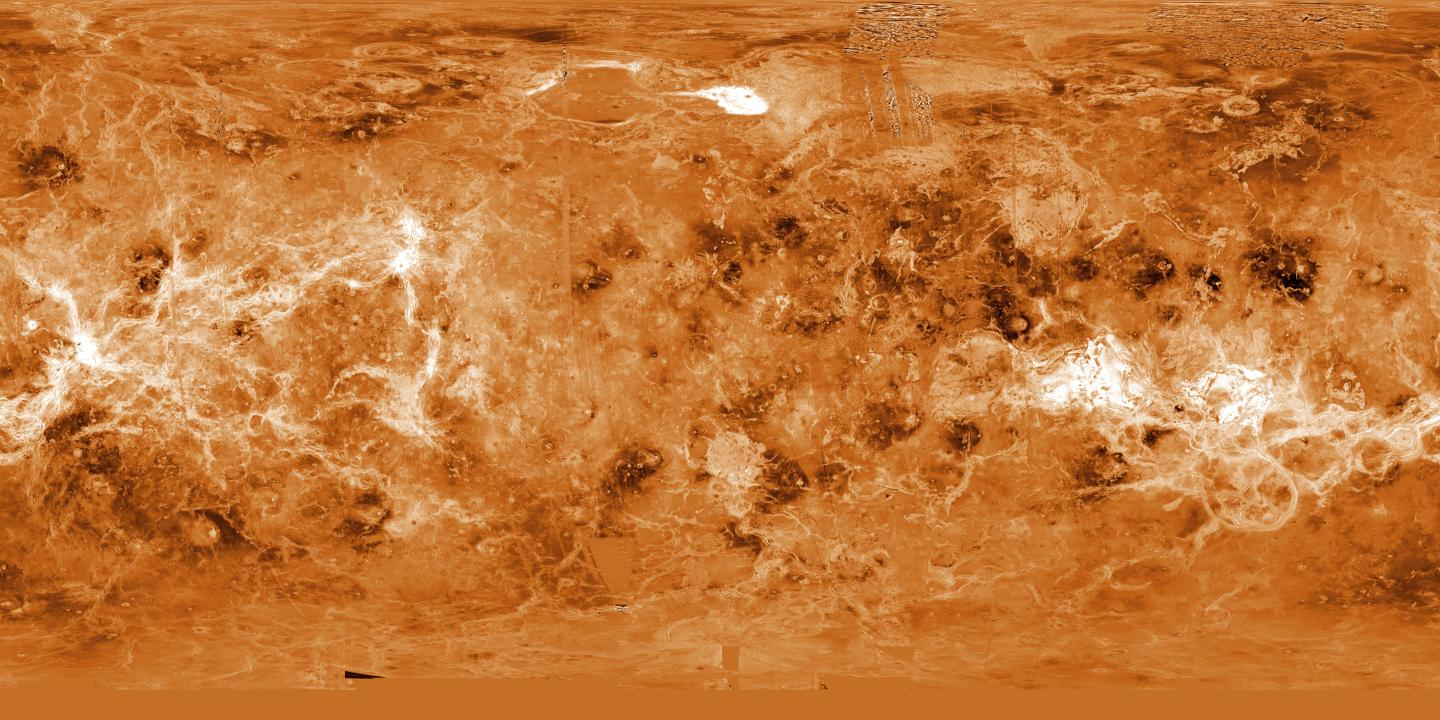
- Minona Corona (Venus)
- Feature type: Corona
- Coordinates: 23.5°N 218.5°E
- Diameter: 130 kilometres (81 mi)
- Eponym: Minona, Beninese goddess

Minona Corona is a corona found on the planet Venus at 23.5°N 218.5°E. It is located in quadrangle V-27 (Ulfrun Regio) and was named after the Beninese goddess Minona, who grants fertility to both women and the land.

== Geography and Geology ==
Minona Corona covers a circular area of approximately 130 kilometres (81 mi) in diameter.

== See also ==
- List of coronae on Venus
