= Artemis Chasma =

Chasma on Venus

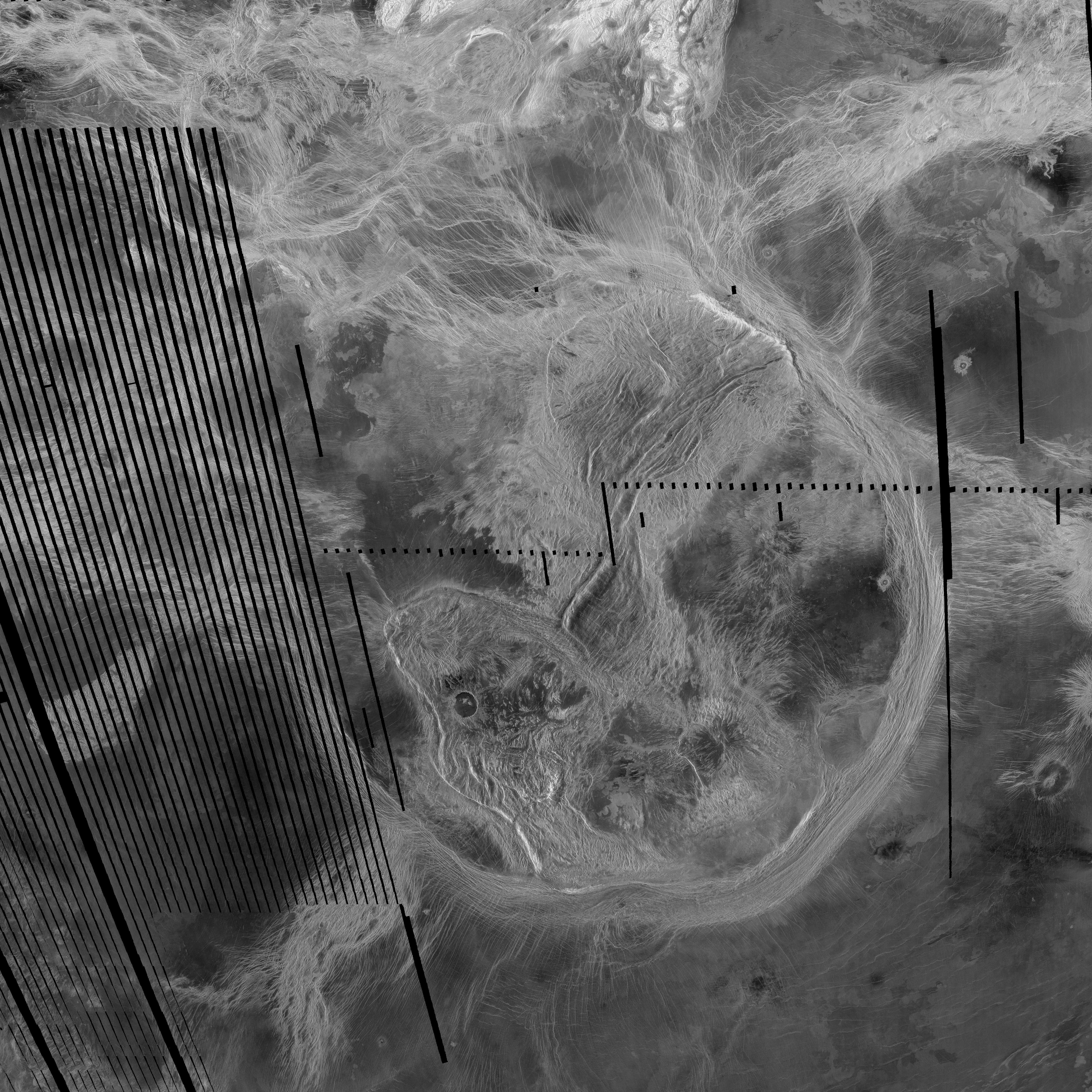
- The near-circular trough of Artemis Chasma
- Feature type: Chasma
- Coordinates: 35°S 135°E
- Diameter: 2,600 km
- Eponym: Artemis

The Artemis Chasma is the nearly circular fracture in Venus's surface which almost encloses Artemis Corona. The chasma and its associating corona can be found on the Aphrodite Terra continent, at Latitude 35° South, Longitude 135° East. It was first described in 1980.

It is named after the Artemis, the Greek virgin goddess of the hunt and the Moon, the hills, the forest, birth, virginity, and fertility, who carries a bow and arrow.
