= Onatah Corona =

Corona on Venus

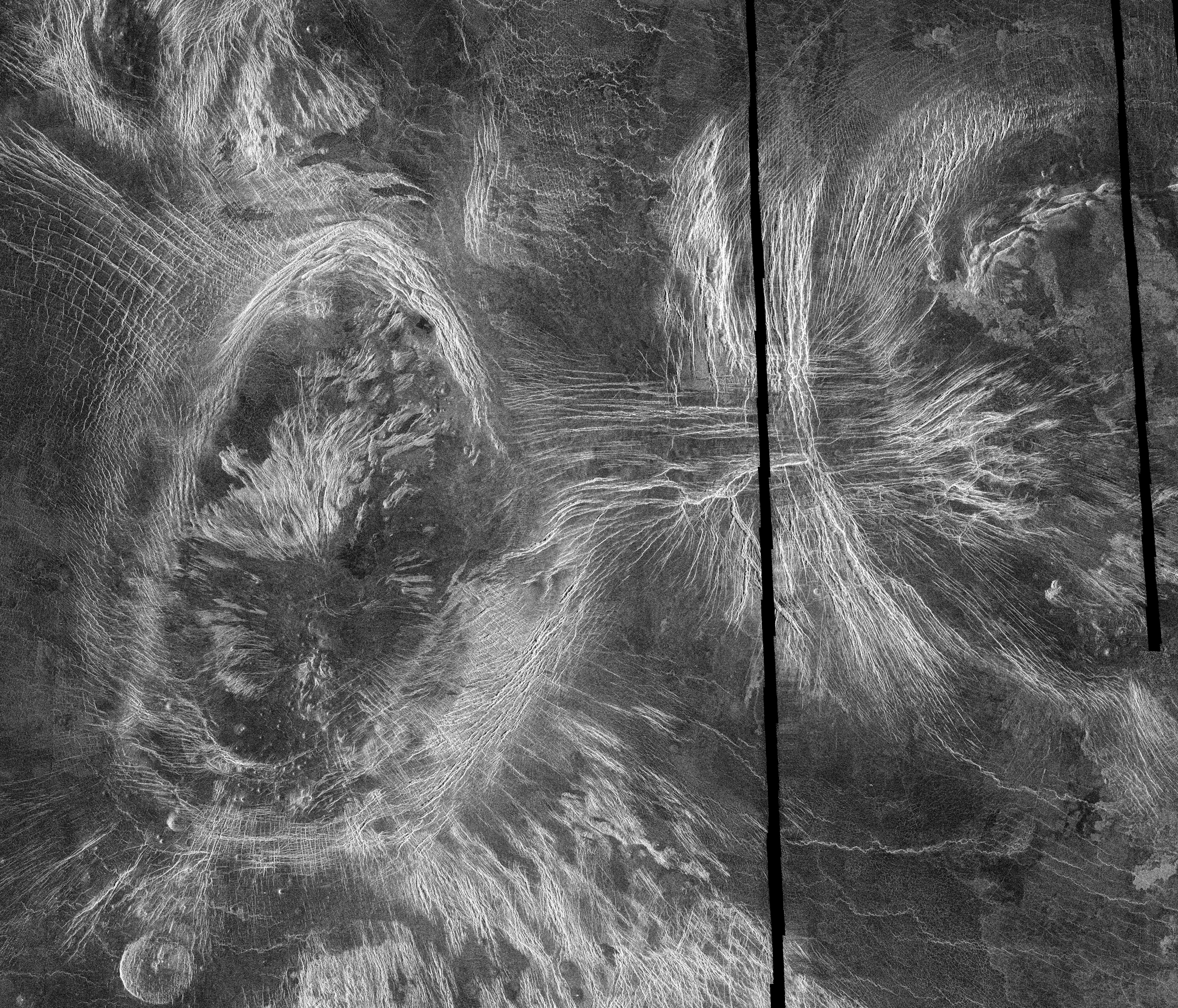
- Onatah is partially visible on the right
- Feature type: Corona
- Coordinates: 49°N 5.5°E
- Diameter: 298 km
- Eponym: Onatah

Onatah Corona is a corona (a geological feature) on Venus adjacent to Ba'het Corona. Both features are surrounded by a ring of ridges and troughs, which in places cut more radially-oriented fractures. The centers of the features also contain radial fractures as well as volcanic domes and flows. Coronae are thought to form due to the upwelling of hot material from deep in the interior of Venus. The two coronae may have formed at the same time over a single upwelling, or may indicate movement of the upwelling or the upper layers of the planet to the west over time.

== See also ==
- List of coronae on Venus
