= Pavlova Corona =

Corona on Venus

- Feature type: Corona
- Coordinates: 14.5°N 40°E
- Diameter: 370 km
- Eponym: Anna Pavlova

Pavlova Corona is a corona found on the planet Venus, at 14.5°N 40°E, Mead Quadrangle. It is named after Anna Pavlova, a Russian ballerina (1881–1931).

== Geography and geology ==
Pavlova Corona covers a circular area of around 400 km in diameter. Pavlova Corona is one of the four major coronae of eastern Eistla Regio (Didilia, Pavlova, Ninmah, and Isong). These coronae have relatively similar structure: an uplifted concentric feature with a central dome and surrounded by a relatively flat interior floor.

== See also ==
- List of coronae on Venus
