= Nightingale Corona =

Corona on Venus

- Feature type: Corona
- Coordinates: 63.6°N 129.5°E
- Diameter: 471
- Eponym: Florence Nightingale

Nightingale Corona is a corona found on the planet Venus. Latitude 63.6° North, Longitude 129.5° East. It has a diameter of 471 kilometers, and is the 35th largest corona on Venus.

It is named for Florence Nightingale, an English nurse. Coronae are conventionally named for goddesses: however, when it was first discovered it was thought to be a crater, and named accordingly. It was 1983 when it was closely observed by the radar imaging equipment aboard the Venera 15 and Venera 16 spacecraft, that its true nature became apparent.

Unlike the circular Aramaiti Corona, the Nightingale formation is more elliptical and irregular in shape.

== See also ==
- List of coronae on Venus
