= Fotla Corona =

Corona on Venus

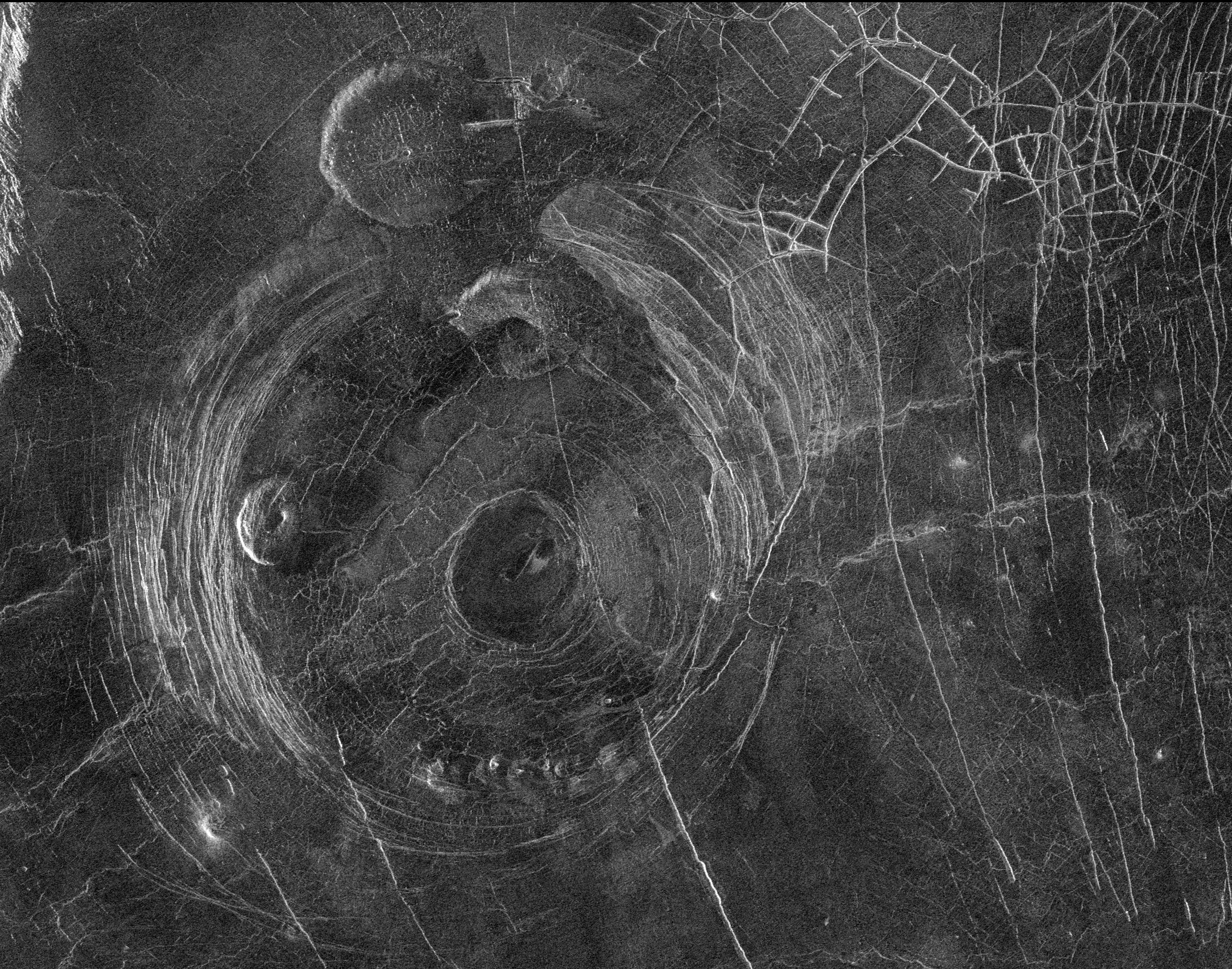
- Magellan radar image
- Feature type: Corona
- Coordinates: 59°S 164°E
- Diameter: 150 km
- Eponym: Celtic fertility goddess.

Fotla Corona is a 150 km diameter corona located on the surface of Nsomeka Planitia, on Venus.

The name derives from the Celtic fertility goddess. It was approved by the IAU in the year 1994. The name was originally called Aine Corona.

== Structure ==
Fotla Corona has a flat-topped pancake dome on the north of the corona, which has a diameter of 31 km. Another one of this structure is located at the west inside the corona. The corona has a complex fracture pattern on the northeast of the corona.
