= Heng-o Corona =

Corona on Venus

- Feature type: Corona
- Coordinates: 2°N 255°E
- Diameter: 1060 km
- Eponym: Heng O

Heng-o Corona is a corona in Guinevere Planitia on the planet Venus at Latitude 2° North, Longitude 355° East. It has a diameter of 1,060 kilometres (660 mi), and is the second largest corona on Venus.

It is named after Heng'e, the original name of Chang'e, the Chinese goddess of the Moon.

== Geography and geology ==
Heng-o Corona is located on the eastern Guinevere. Within the faulted ring system of Heng-o Corona lies several small impact craters and intricate fractures which trend to the north and to the northwest of the corona.

== See also ==
- List of coronae on Venus
