= Triglava Corona =

Corona on Venus

- Feature type: Corona
- Location: Venus
- Diameter: 400 km
- Eponym: Triglava, Ancient Slavic earth goddess.

Triglava Corona is a 400 km diameter corona on the surface of Venus, located on the western flank of the Addams crater, and the eastern flank of the Fredegonde crater, and in contact of the Reitia Chasma.

Its name derives after the ancient Slavic earth goddess named Triglava. It was accepted by the IAU in the year 1997. On Venus, coronae are named after fertility and earth goddesses.
