= Xcacau Corona =

Corona on Venus

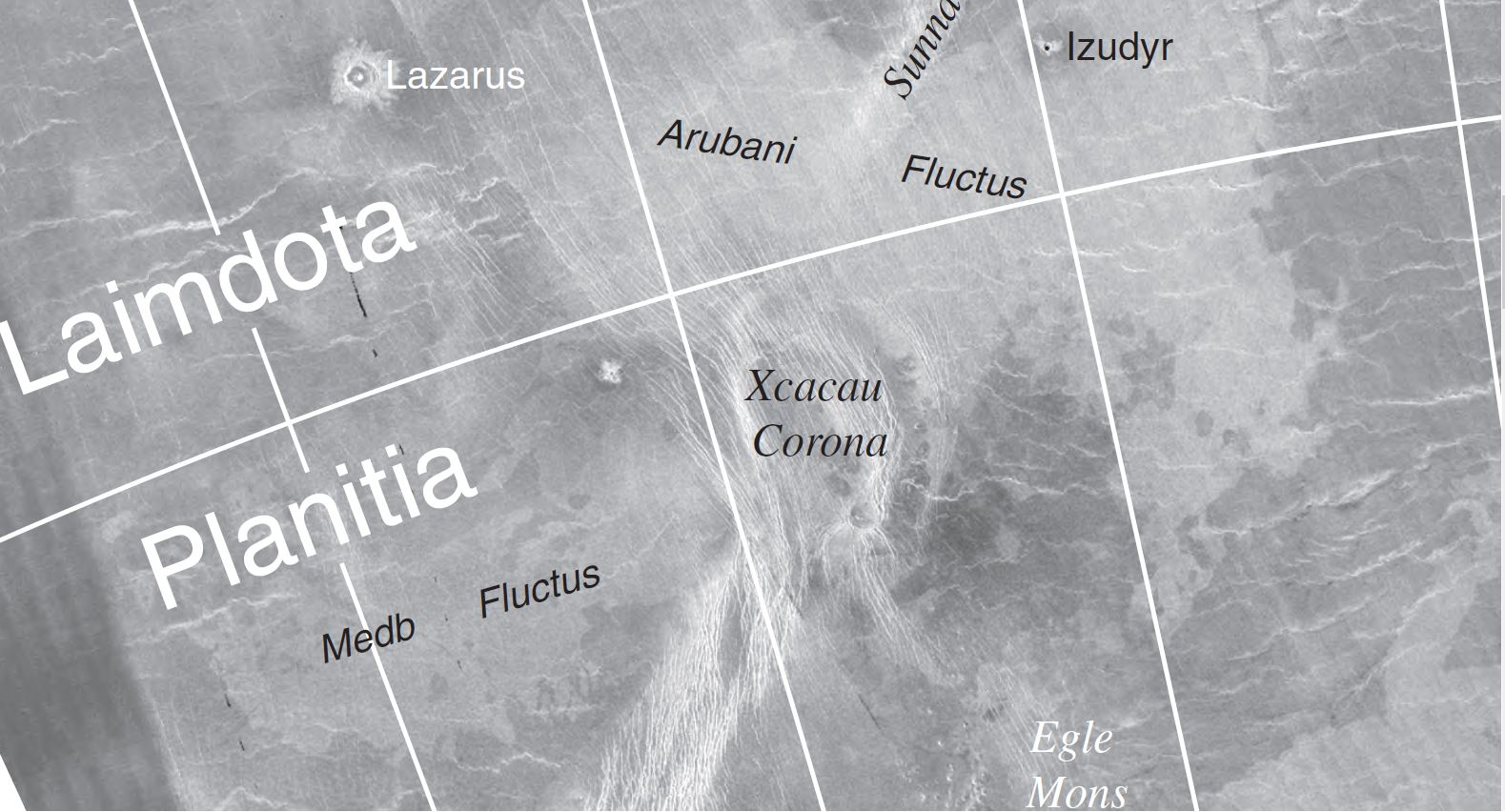
- Part of a radar map of Venus showing Xcacau Corona
- Feature type: Corona
- Location: Henie Quadrangle, Venus
- Coordinates: 56°S 131°E
- Diameter: 200 km
- Eponym: Xcacau

Xcacau Corona is a corona (geological formation in the form of crown) on the planet Venus, in the coordinates -56 ° S and 131 ° E.

It spans a circular area approximately 200 kilometers in diameter and is situated within the Henie Quadrangle. Coronae on Venus like Xcacau are thought to be formed by upwelling of warm material from the mantle, leading to the formation of concentric tectonic ridges and a central uplift. This process reflects ongoing geological activity on Venus, which may be similar to early tectonic activities observed on Earth.

The corona was named in 1997 after the Xcacau, the K'iche' goddess of cacao and fertility, reflecting the practice of naming planetary features after significant cultural or mythological figures. and fertility.

== See also ==
- Corona (planetary geology)
