= Geodynamics of Venus =

Venus
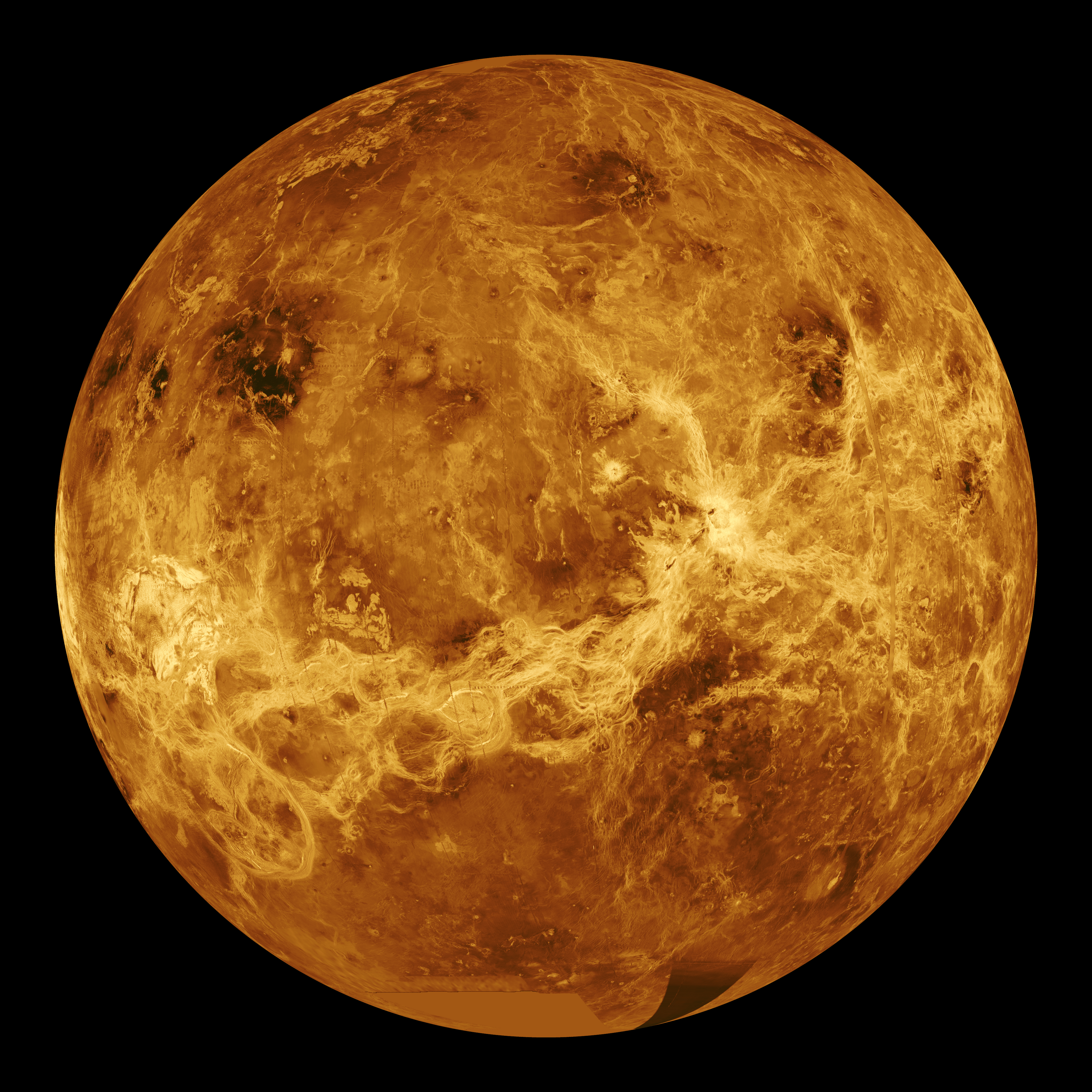
- Global radar view of the surface from Magellan radar imaging between 1990 and 1994

Physical characteristics
- Mean radius: 6051.8±1.0 km; 0.9499 Earths
- Surface area: 4.60×10^{8} km^{2}; 0.902 Earths
- Volume: 9.28×10^{11} km^{3}; 0.866 Earths
- Mass: 4.8676×10^{24} kg; 0.815 Earths
- Mean density: 5.243 g/cm^{3}
- Surface gravity: 8.87 m/s^{2}; 0.904 g
| Surface temp. | min | mean | max |
|---|---|---|---|
| Kelvin | | 737 K |
| Celsius | | 462 °C |
| Fahrenheit | | 864 °F (462 °C) |

Atmosphere
- Surface pressure: 92 bar (9.2 MPa)

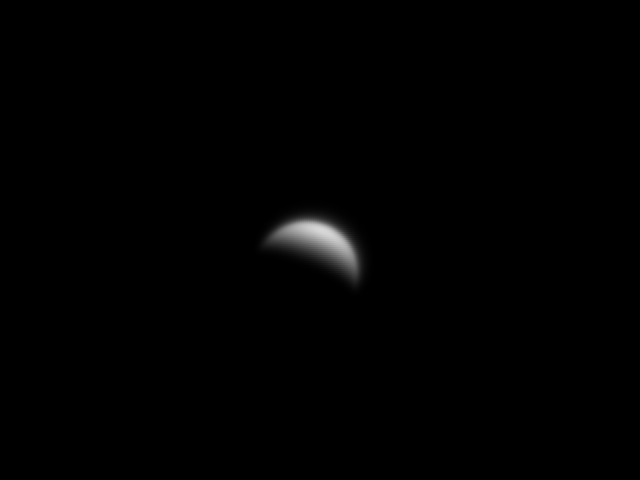
Planet Venus Observed with Modern Telescope on April 10, 2020

NASA's Magellan spacecraft mission discovered that Venus has a geologically young surface with a relatively uniform age of 500±200 Ma (million years). The age of Venus was revealed by the observation of over 900 impact craters on the surface of the planet. These impact craters are nearly uniformly distributed over the surface of Venus and less than 10% have been modified by plains of volcanism or deformation. These observations indicate that a catastrophic resurfacing event took place on Venus around 500 Ma, and was followed by a dramatic decline in resurfacing rate. The radar images from the Magellan missions revealed that the terrestrial style of plate tectonics is not active on Venus and the surface currently appears to be immobile.

Despite these surface observations, there are numerous surface features that indicate an actively convecting interior. The Soviet Venera landings revealed that the surface of Venus is essentially basaltic in composition based on geochemical measurements and morphology of volcanic flows. The surface of Venus is dominated by patterns of basaltic volcanism, and by compressional and extensional tectonic deformation, such as the highly deformed tesserae terrain and the pancake like volcano-tectonic features known as coronae. The planet's surface can be broadly characterized by its low lying plains, which cover about 80% of the surface, 'continental' plateaus and volcanic swells. There is also an abundance of small and large shield volcanoes distributed over the planet's surface. Based on its surface features, it appears that Venus is tectonically and convectively alive but has a lithosphere that is static.

== Resurfacing hypotheses ==
The global distribution of impact craters that was discovered by the Magellan mission to Venus has led to numerous theories on Venusian resurfacing. Phillips et al. (1992) developed two conceptual end-member resurfacing models that describe the distribution of impact craters. The first end-member model suggests that a spatially random distribution of craters can be maintained by having short-duration resurfacing events of large spatial area that occur in random locations with long intervening time intervals. A special case of this end-member would be global resurfacing events; for this case one would be unable to tell from the current surface whether the last global event was part of a recurring cycle or a singular event in the planet's history. The other end-member is that resurfacing events that wipe out craters are of small spatial area, randomly distributed and frequently occurring.

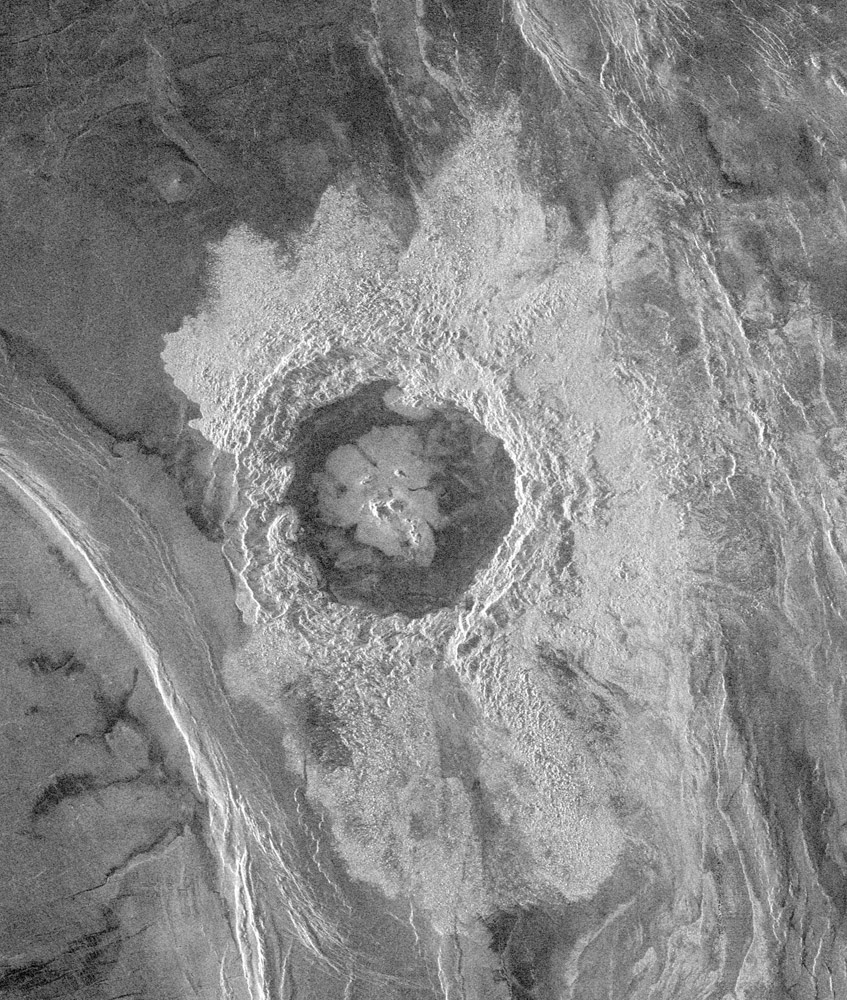
The image is approximately 185 kilometers (115 miles) wide at the base and shows Dickinson, an impact crater 69 kilometers (43 miles) in diameter. The crater is complex, characterized by a partial central ring and a floor flooded by radar-dark and radar-bright materials. The lack of ejecta to the west may indicate that the impactor that produced the crater was an oblique impact from the west. Extensive radar-bright flows that emanate from the crater's eastern walls may represent large volumes of impact melt, or they may be the result of volcanic material released from the subsurface during the cratering event.

This is effectively a uniformitarian hypothesis as it assumes that geologic activity is occurring everywhere at similar rates. Global events that periodically resurface nearly the entire planet will leave a crater-free surface: craters then occur and aren't subsequently modified until the next global event. Resurfacing events occurring frequently everywhere will produce a surface with many craters in the process of being resurfaced. Thus, the end-members can be distinguished by observing the extent to which the craters have experienced some degree of tectonic deformation or volcanic flooding.

Initial surveys of the crater population suggested that only a few percent of the craters were heavily deformed or embayed by subsequent volcanism, thus favoring the "catastrophic resurfacing" end member. A number of geophysical models were proposed to generate a global catastrophe, including

- episodic plate tectonics proposed by Turcotte (1993)
- a transition from mobile lid to stagnant lid convection proposed by Solomatov and Moresi (1996)
- and a rapid transition from a thin to thick lithosphere proposed by Reese et al. (2007)

The portion of the planet with large rift zones and superposed volcanoes was found to correlate with a low crater density and an unusual number of heavily deformed and obviously embayed craters. The tessera regions of the planet seem to have a slightly higher than normal percentage of craters, but a few of these craters appear to be heavily deformed. These observations, combined with global geologic mapping activities, lead to scenarios of geologic surface evolution that paralleled the catastrophic geophysical models. The general vision is that the tessera regions are old and date to a past time of more intense surface deformation; in rapid succession the tessera ceased deforming and volcanism flooded the low-lying areas; currently geologic activity is concentrated along the planet's rift zones.

=== Episodic plate tectonics ===
Turcotte (1993) suggested that Venus has episodic tectonics, whereby short periods of rapid tectonics are separated by periods of surface inactivity lasting on the order of 500 Ma. During periods of inactivity, the lithosphere cools conductively and thickens to over 300 km. The active mode of plate tectonics occurs when the thick lithosphere detaches and founders into the interior of the planet. Large scale lithosphere recycling is thus invoked to explain resurfacing events. Episodic large scale overturns can occur due to a compositionally stratified mantle where there is competition between the compositional and thermal buoyancy of the upper mantle.

This sort of mantle layering is further supported by the 'basalt barrier' mechanism, which states that subducted basaltic crust is positively buoyant between the mantle depths of 660–750 km, and negatively buoyant at other depths, and can accumulate at the bottom of the transition zone and cause mantle layering. The breakdown of mantle layering and consequent mantle overturns would lead to dramatic episodes of volcanism, formation of large amounts of crust, and tectonic activity on the planet's surface, as has been inferred to have happened on Venus around 500 Ma from the surface morphology and cratering. Catastrophic resurfacing and widespread volcanism can be caused periodically by an increase in mantle temperature due to a change in surface boundary conditions from mobile to stagnant lid.

=== Stagnant lid convection ===
Despite their categorical separation, all of the models display some sort of conceptual overlap that applies to the others. Solomatov and Moresi (1996) suggested that a reduction in convective stresses caused the surface lid to change from mobile to stagnant. This argument proposed that the present surface of Venus records a permanent end to lithospheric recycling. The decrease in planetary heat flow, as convective vigor decreased, changed the mode of mantle convection from mobile to stagnant.

Despite their previous publication, Moresi and Solomatov (1998) used numerical models of mantle convection with temperature-dependent viscosity to propose that at intermediate levels of yield stress for the lithosphere, a change from a mobile to an episodic convective regime for Venus could occur. They focused on an episodic regime for a current explanation of Venus, whereby brittle mobilization of the Venusian lithosphere may be episodic and catastrophic.

=== Transition from thin to thick lithosphere ===
Reese et al. (2007) proposed a model of planet resurfacing, whereby lithosphere thinning and widespread melting follows a shift from mobile lid to stagnant lid convection. These parameterized convection models suggest that a cessation of magmatic resurfacing can occur in several ways: (1) the mantle temperature drops sufficiently such that mantle rising adiabatically does not cross the solidus, (2) the molten layer migrates below the solid/melt density inversion at 250–500 km so that no melt can escape, and (3) sublithospheric, small-scale convection stops and conductive thickening of the lid suppresses melting. In each case, the inability of magma to penetrate the thickened Venusian lithosphere plays a role. However, it has been suggested that Venus's surface has experienced a continuous but geologically rapid decline in tectonic activity due to the secular cooling of the planet, and no catastrophic resurfacing event is required to explain its heat loss.

=== Directional history hypothesis ===
In a series of subsequent papers, Basilevsky and colleagues extensively developed a model that Guest and Stofan (1999) termed the "directional history" for Venus evolution. The general idea is that there is a global stratigraphy that progresses from heavily deformed tessera, to heavily deformed, then moderately deformed plains, and then to undeformed plains. Most recent activity is focused near major rift zones that tend to intersect with large shield volcanoes.

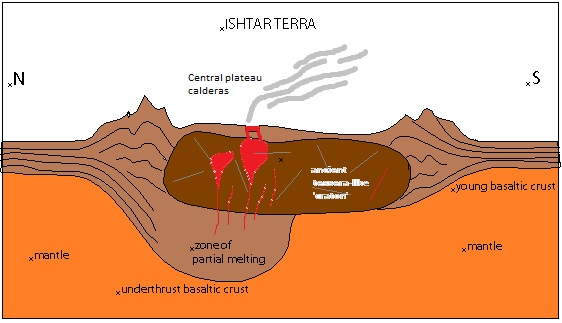
The interpretation of tessera as older continental-style cratons is supported by geological analysis of Ashtar Terra and its surroundings. Compression forces, coupled with the inability of the thin basaltic crust to subduct, resulted in fold mountains around the edges of Ishtar. Further compression led to underthrusting of material that subsequently was able to partially melt and feed volcanism in the central plateau.

If the directional evolution model is valid then the evolution must have been slow and the timing of events would have overlapped considerably. A valid end member interpretation is that the crater population still represents a population emplaced on a mostly inactive planet, but the final throes of a global emplacement of volcanic plains has filled most of the craters with a few hundred meters of volcanic flows. If this is true, then post-tessera plains emplacement must have dragged on for most of the visible surface history of the planet and the cessation of tessera deformation must have overlapped considerably with emplacement of plains. Thus, while a tessera/plains/rifts evolution is a valid hypothesis, that evolution could not have occurred as a "catastrophe". The highly varying levels of post-impact volcanism and deformation that the craters have experienced are consistent with a steady state model of Venus resurfacing. The craters are in a variety of stages of removal but display the same processes that have operated throughout the visible surface history. It remains a powerful constraint that the distribution of geologic features on the planet (plains, volcanoes, rifts, etc.) is decidedly more nonuniform than the crater population. This means that while the nature of resurfacing on Venus may vary regionally in the uniformitarian hypothesis, the rates must be similar.

== See also ==
- Outline of Venus
- Transit of Venus
- Venus zone
- Stats of planets in the Solar System
