= Abundia Corona =

Corona on Venus

- Feature type: Corona
- Coordinates: 18.5°N 125°E
- Diameter: 250 km
- Eponym: Norse goddess of giving

Abundia Corona is a corona on the surface of Venus, with a diameter of 250 km. Its name comes from the Norse goddess of giving.

== Surroundings ==
Abundia Corona is next to both the crater Himiko, and the corona Nintu. The corona can be found at the quadrangle, Greenaway V-24.
