= Nsomeka Planitia =

Planitia on Venus

- Feature type: Planitia
- Location: Henie Quadrangle, Venus
- Coordinates: 53°0′N 195°0′E
- Diameter: 2,100 km
- Eponym: Bantu culture heroine

Nsomeka Planitia is a 2,100 km diameter planitia on the surface of Venus.

The plain derives, and was name after the Bantu culture heroine.

Nsomeka Planitia is located both at the quadrangle of Henie, and Barrymore.
