= Whatitiri Corona =

Corona on Venus

- Feature type: Corona
- Location: Venus
- Diameter: 300 km
- Eponym: Maori ancestor goddess, great mother.

Whatitiri Corona is a 300 km diameter corona on the surface of Venus, located at 83.00° South, and 140.00° East. Nearby features include the crater Bickerdyke and the fluctūs Yagami and Naunet.

== Naming ==
In 1999, the Task Group on Venus Nomenclature, which is part of the International Astronomical Union's Working Group on Planetary System Nomenclature, named about 65 geological features on Venus, namely 19 coronae. And Whatitiri was one of them. It is named after Whaitiri, a Māori ancestor goddess and great mother. It was accepted by the International Astronomical Union in the year 2000. On Venus, coronae are named after fertility and earth goddesses.
