= Artemis Corona =

Corona on Venus

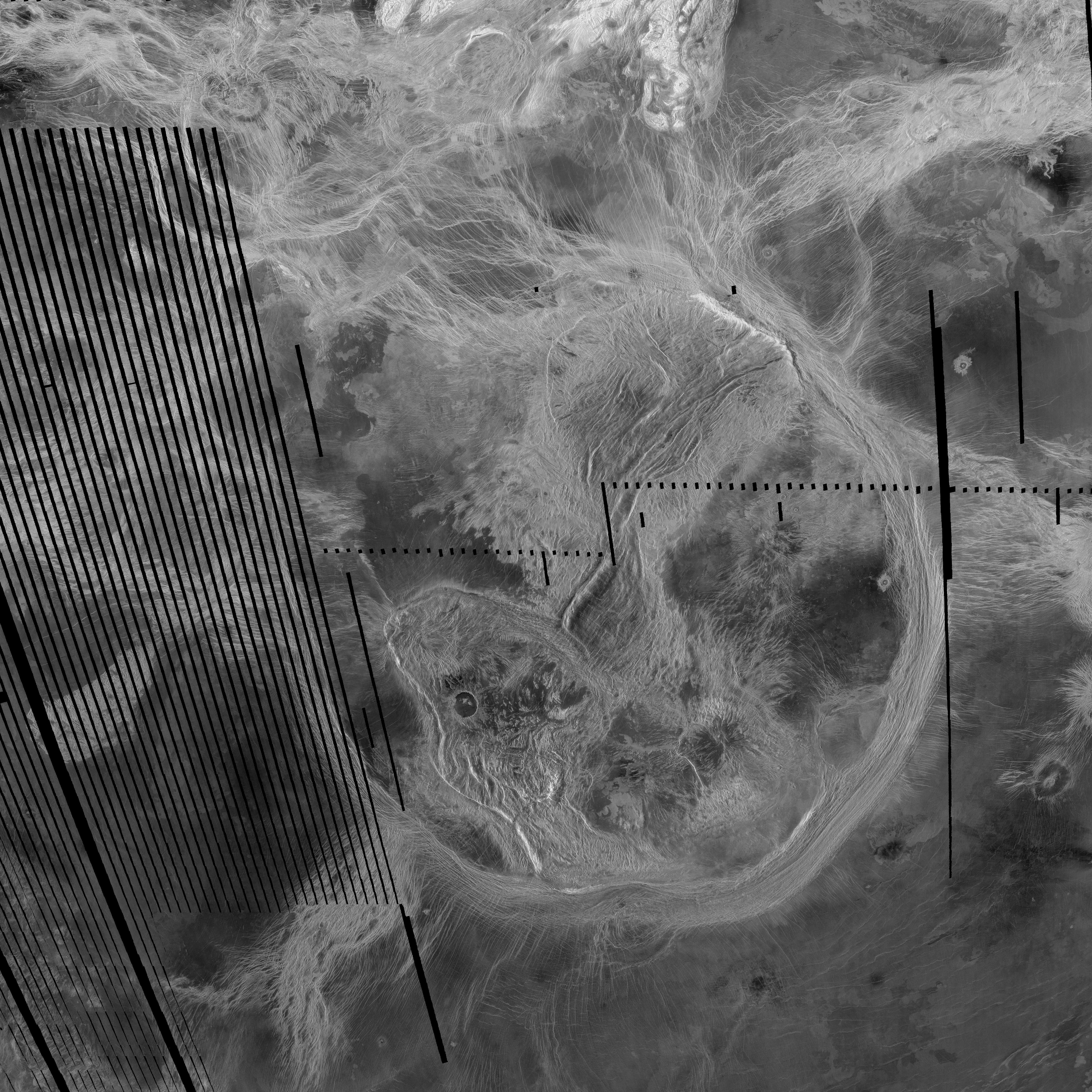
- Radar image of Artemis Corona
- Feature type: Corona
- Coordinates: 35°S 135°E
- Diameter: 2,600 kilometers (1,600 mi)
- Eponym: Artemis

Artemis Corona is a corona found in the Aphrodite Terra continent, on the planet Venus, at 35°S 135°E.

Named after Artemis, the Greek goddess of hunting, it is the largest corona on Venus, with a diameter of 2,600 kilometers (1,600 mi). First described in 1980, it is largely enclosed by the near circular Artemis Chasma – a circular belt of arc-shaped features believed to be largely of compressional origin.

Artemis is an unusual feature on Venus as it has been interpreted to be the site of plate tectonics operating on a regional scale. There are grabens and compressional arcs which rise above the surrounding plains. As a whole, Artemis is not elevated like other coronae. Regions within Artemis are in fact some 4 kilometers (2.5 mi) below the surrounding plains. The differences between the highest and the lowest point within Artemis are in the order of 7.5 kilometers (4.7 mi).

The central rift region of Artemis has been interpreted as a spreading zone (Britomartis Chasma) which has been offset – with clear signs of strike-slip faulting offsetting the central rift zone. Retrograde subduction is interpreted to occur at the circular arc belts of Artemis Chasmata.

== See also ==
- List of coronae on Venus
