= Trotula Corona =

Corona on Venus

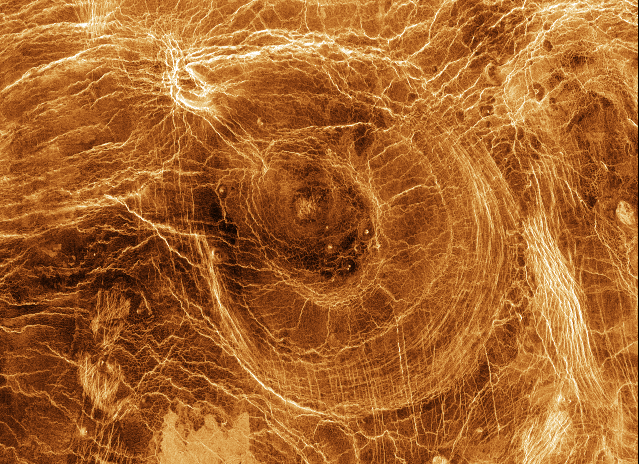
- Feature type: Corona
- Location: Venus
- Coordinates: 41.3° N 18.9° E
- Diameter: 146 km
- Eponym: Trotula, an Italian physician (A.D. 1097). Name changed from Trotula Patera.

Trotula Corona is a 146 km diameter corona and an arachnoid on the surface of Venus. It is part of the largest arachnoid group on Bereghinya planitia, located at the west of the group.

Its name derives from an Italian physician, Trotula. The name was accepted by the IAU in the year 2003. On Venus coronae are usually named after fertility and earth goddesses.
