= Quadrangle of Henie =

Venusian region

The Quadrangle of Henie is one of the 62 quadrilateral defined by the cartography of Venus approved by the International Astronomical Union.

On the scale maps of 1 / 5,000,000 (identified by the code V-58) it includes the part of the surface of Venus located in the latitude between 50 ° and 75 ° S and a length between 120 ° and 180 ° E.

It owes its name to Henie's crater.

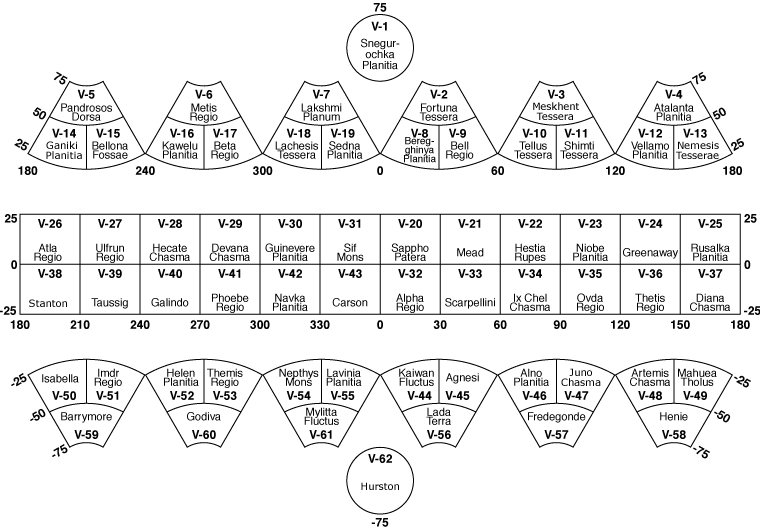
Quadrangles of Venus on a scale map 1 / 5,000,000

== See also ==
- Xcacau Corona
