= Orbit of Venus =

Representation of Venus (yellow) and Earth (blue) circling around the Sun.

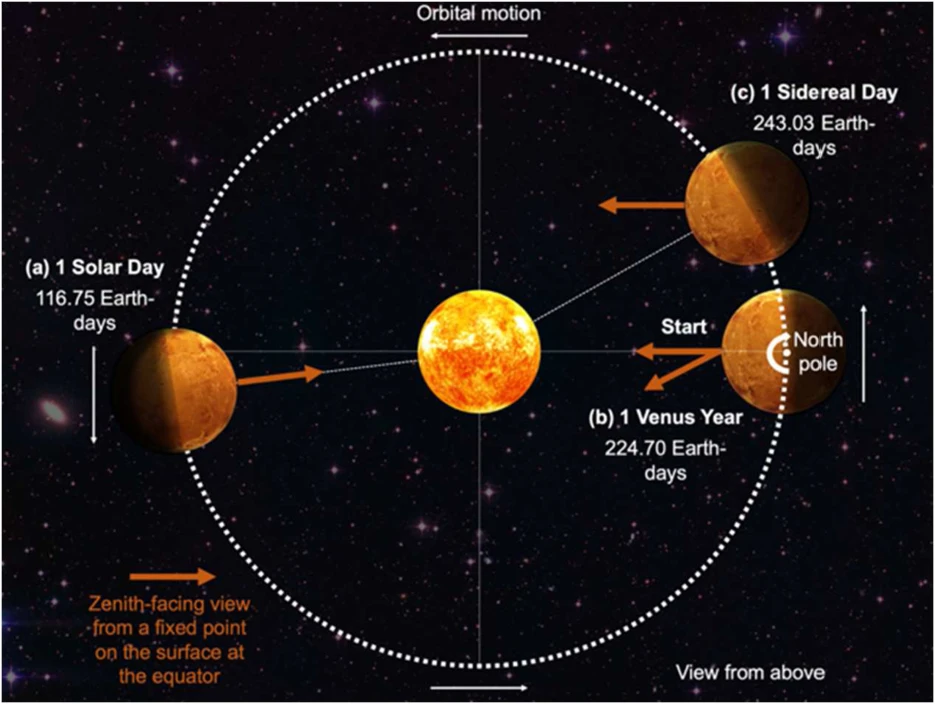
Venus and its rotation in respect to its revolution.

Venus has an orbit with a semi-major axis of 0.723 au (108,200,000 km; 67,200,000 mi), and an eccentricity of 0.007. The low eccentricity and comparatively small size of its orbit give Venus the least range in distance between perihelion and aphelion of the planets: 1.46 million km. The planet orbits the Sun once every 225 days and travels 4.54 au (679,000,000 km; 422,000,000 mi) in doing so, giving an average orbital speed of 35 km/s (78,000 mph).

== Conjunctions and transits ==
When the geocentric ecliptic longitude of Venus coincides with that of the Sun, it is in conjunction with the Sun – inferior if Venus is nearer and superior if farther. The distance between Venus and Earth varies from about 42 million km (at inferior conjunction) to about 258 million km (at superior conjunction). The average period between successive conjunctions of one type is 584 days – one synodic period of Venus. Five synodic periods of Venus is almost exactly 13 sidereal Venus years and 8 Earth years, and consequently the longitudes and distances almost repeat.

The 3.4° inclination of Venus's orbit is great enough to usually prevent the inferior planet from passing directly between the Sun and Earth at inferior conjunction. Such solar transits of Venus rarely occur, but with great predictability and interest.

== Close approaches to Earth and Mercury ==
In this current era, the nearest that Venus comes to Earth is just under 40 million km. Because the range of heliocentric distances is greater for the Earth than for Venus, the closest approaches come near Earth's perihelion. The Earth's declining eccentricity is increasing the minimum distances. The last time Venus drew nearer than 39.5 million km was in 1623, but that will not happen again for many millennia, and in fact after 5683 Venus will not even come closer than 40 million km for about 60,000 years. The orientation of the orbits of the two planets is not favorable for minimizing the close approach distance. The longitudes of aphelion were only 29 degrees apart at J2000, so the smallest distances, which come when inferior conjunction happens near Earth's perihelion, occur when Venus is near perihelion. An example was the transit of December 6, 1882: Venus reached perihelion Jan 9, 1883, and Earth did the same on December 31. Venus was 0.7205 au from the Sun on the day of transit, decidedly less than average.

Moving far backwards in time, more than 200,000 years ago Venus sometimes passed by at a distance from Earth of barely less than 38 million km, and will next do that after more than 400,000 years.

Venus and Earth come the closest, but they come less often closer than Venus and Mercury. While Venus approaches Earth the closest, Mercury approaches Earth more often the closest of all planets. That said, Venus and Earth still have the lowest gravitational potential difference between them than to any other planet, needing the lowest delta-v to transfer between them, than to any other planet from them.

The distance between Venus and Mercury will become smaller over time primarily because of Mercury's increasing eccentricity.

== Historical importance ==
The discovery of phases of Venus by Galileo in 1610 was important. It contradicted the model of Ptolemy which considered all celestial objects to revolve around the Earth and was consistent with others, such as those of Tycho and Copernicus.

In Galileo’s day the prevailing model of the universe was based on the assertion by the Greek astronomer Ptolemy almost 15 centuries earlier that all celestial objects revolve around Earth (see Ptolemaic system). Observation of the phases of Venus was inconsistent with this view but was consistent with the Polish astronomer Nicolaus Copernicus’s idea that the Solar System is centered on the Sun. Galileo’s observation of the phases of Venus provided the first direct observational evidence for Copernican theory.

Observations of transits of Venus across the Sun have played a major role in the history of astronomy in the determination of a more accurate value of the astronomical unit.

== Accuracy and predictability ==
Venus has a very well observed and predictable orbit. From the perspective of all but the most demanding, its orbit is simple. An equation in Astronomical Algorithms that assumes an unperturbed elliptical orbit predicts the perihelion and aphelion times with an error of a few hours. Using orbital elements to calculate those distances agrees to actual averages to at least five significant figures. Formulas for computing position straight from orbital elements typically do not provide or need corrections for the effects of other planets.

However, observations are much better now, and space age technology has replaced the older techniques. E. Myles Standish wrote Classical ephemerides over the past centuries have been based entirely upon optical observations: almost exclusively, meridian circle transit timings. With the advent of planetary radar, spacecraft missions, VLBI, etc., the situation for the four inner planets has changed dramatically. For DE405, created in 1998, optical observations were dropped and as he wrote initial conditions for the inner four planets were adjusted to ranging data primarily... Now the orbit estimates are dominated by observations of the Venus Express spacecraft. The orbit is now known to sub-kilometer accuracy.

== Table of orbital parameters ==
No more than five significant figures are presented here, and to this level of precision the numbers match very well the VSOP87 elements and calculations derived from them, Standish's (of JPL) 250-year best fit, Newcomb's, and calculations using the actual positions of Venus over time.

distances	au	Million km
semimajor axis	0.72333	108.21
perihelion	0.71843	107.48
aphelion	0.7282	108.94
average	0.72335	108.21
circumference	4.545	679.9
closest approach to Earth	0.2643	39.54

eccentricity
0.0068 (almost perfect circle)

angles	degrees
inclination to ecliptic	3.39

times	days
orbital period	224.70
synodic period	583.92

speed	km/s
average speed	35.02
maximum speed	35.26
minimum speed	34.78

== Dust ring ==
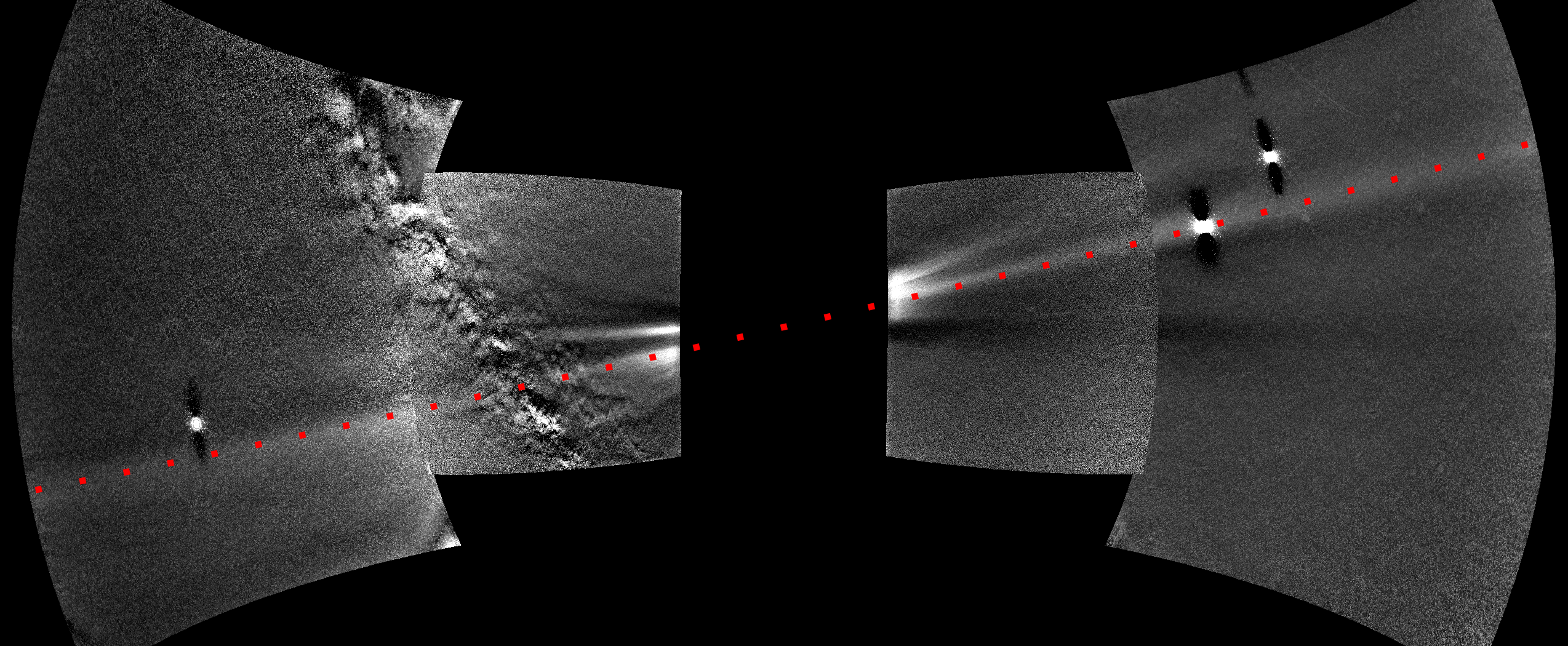
First ever panorama image of the dust ring of Venus's orbital space, imaged by Parker Solar Probe.

Venus's orbital space has been shown to have its own dust ring-cloud, with a suspected origin either from Venus trailing asteroids, interplanetary dust migrating in waves, or the remains of the Solar System's circumstellar disc out of which its proto-planetary disc and then itself, the Solar planetary system, formed.
