= Arachnoid (astrogeology) =

Large structure of unknown origin on Venus

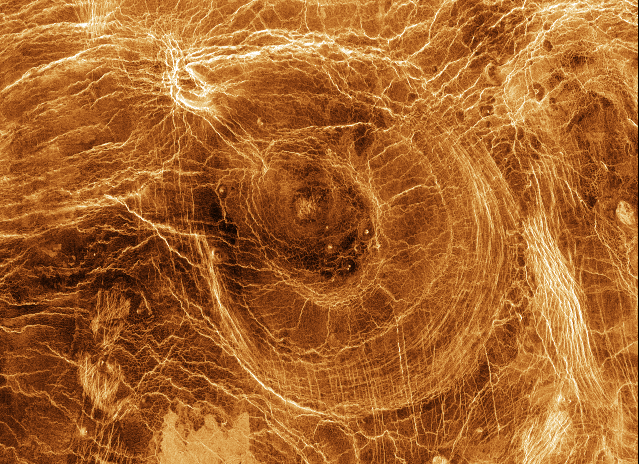
Venusian arachnoid Trotula Corona

In astrogeology, an arachnoid /əˈræknɔɪd/ is a large geological structure resembling a spider web. They are of unknown origin, and have been found only on the surface of the planet Venus. They appear as concentric ovals surrounded by a complex network of fractures, and can span 200 kilometers. Over 90 arachnoids have been identified on Venus.

Arachnoids could be related to volcanos, however it is also possible that different arachnoids are formed by different processes. One possible explanation is that an upwelling of magma from the interior of the planet pushed up on the surface, causing cracks. An alternate hypothesis concerning their origin is that they are a precursor to coronae formation.

Much of what is known about arachnoids is the result of studies performed by C.B. Dawson and L.S. Crumpler.

== See also ==
- Chaos terrain
- Geysers on Mars
- Pancake dome
- Rille
- Coronae
