= Pancake dome =

Type of lava dome found on the planet Venus

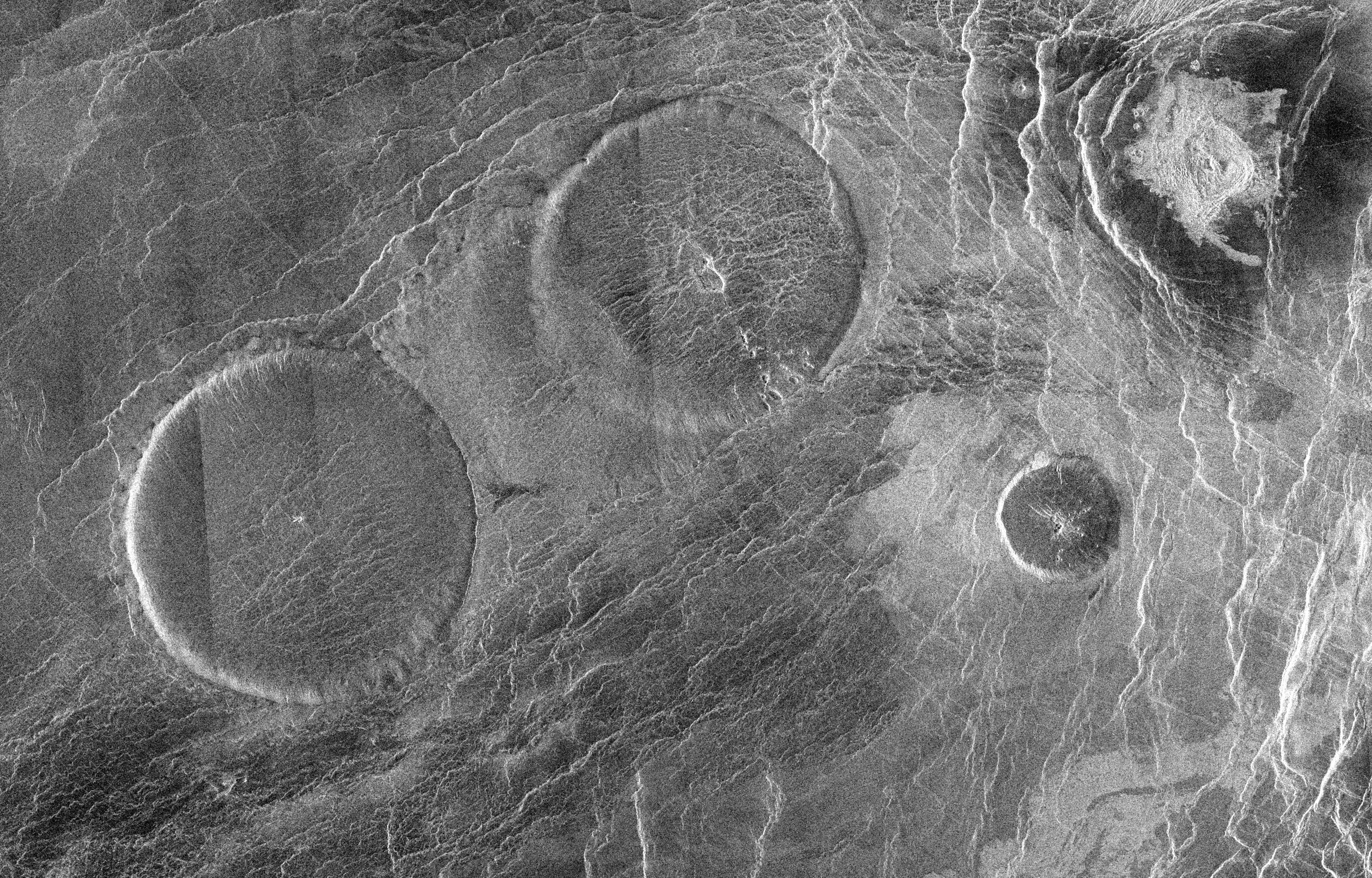
Several "pancake volcanoes" called Carmenta Farra

A pancake dome, known in planetary nomenclature as farrum (plural farra) is an unusual type of lava dome found on the planet Venus. They are widely scattered on that planet and often form groups or clusters, though with smaller numbers of pancake domes in each group than is typical for the more common shield volcanos. They are commonly found near coronae and tesserae (large regions of highly deformed terrain, folded and fractured in two or three dimensions, believed to be unique to Venus) in the lowland plains. Pancake domes are between 10 and 100 times larger than volcanic domes formed on Earth.

== Description ==
Pancake domes have a broad, flat profile similar to shield volcanoes and are thought to form from one large, slow eruption of viscous silica-rich lava. They usually have a central pit- or bowl-like feature similar to a volcanic crater, but it is thought that these pits form after the eruption as the lava cools and emits gas rather than being a vent from which the lava originated. The surface of pancake domes are covered with patterns of small cracks and faults.

== See also ==
- Arachnoid
- Volcanism on Venus
