= East Slavic name =

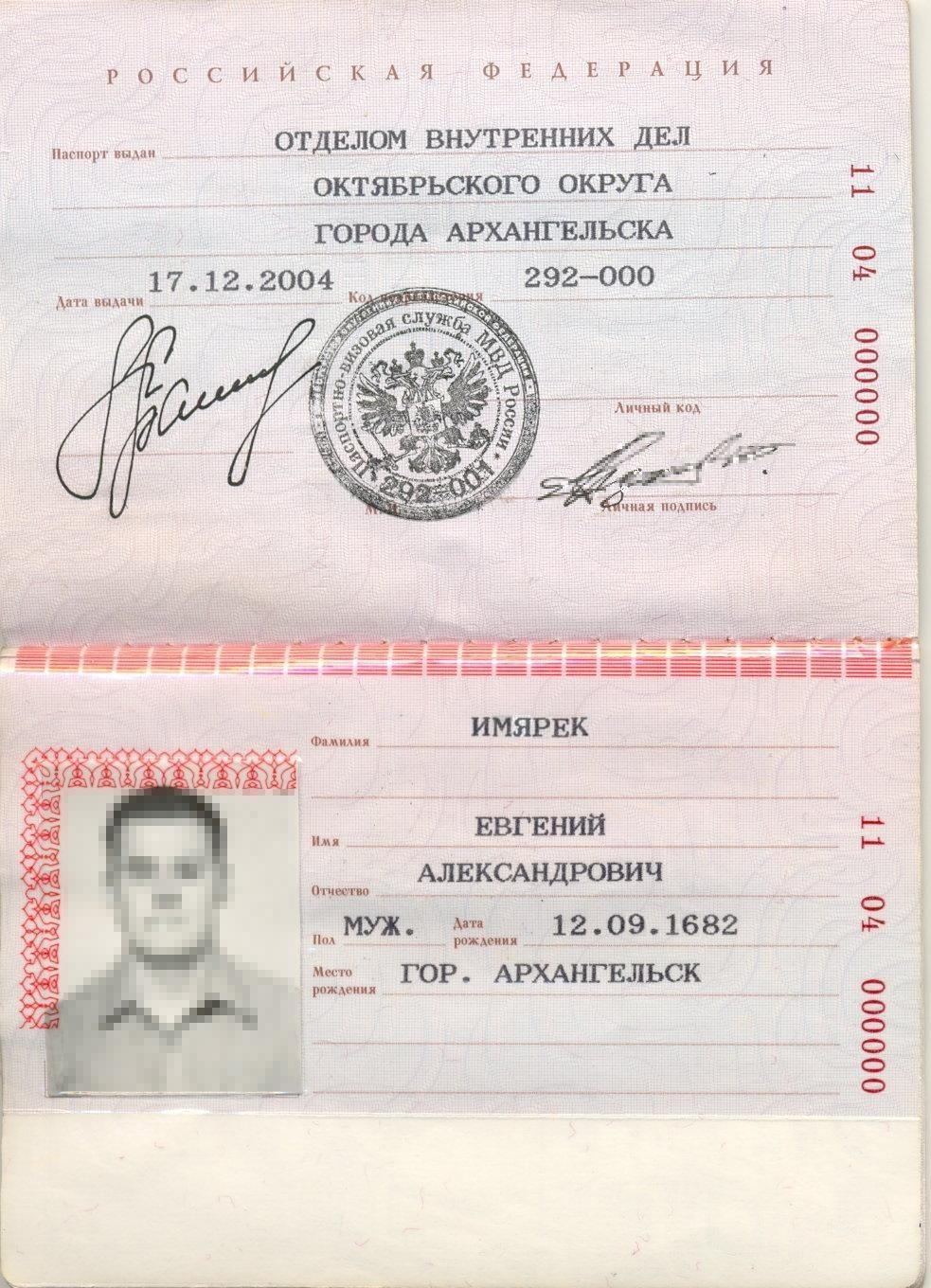
A Russian citizen's (Yevgeniy Aleksandrovich Imyarek) internal passport. The lower page includes the lines: Russian: Фамилия, romanized: Familiya, lit. 'Family name', Russian: Имя, romanized: Imya ("Name") and Russian: Отчество, romanized: Otchestvo, lit. 'Patronymic'.

East Slavic naming customs are the traditional way of identifying a person's given name, patronymic name, and family name in East Slavic cultures in Russia and some countries formerly part of the Russian Empire and the Soviet Union.

They are used commonly in Russia, Ukraine, Belarus, Moldova, Kazakhstan, Turkmenistan, Uzbekistan, and to a lesser extent in Kyrgyzstan, Tajikistan, Azerbaijan, Armenia and Georgia.

Name	Belarusian example	Russian example	Ukrainian example
First name (given name)	Уладзімір, Uladzimir	Владимир, Vladimir	Володимир, Volodymyr
Patronymic	Антонавіч, Antonavič	Антонович, Antonovich	Антонович, Antonovych
Family name (surname)	Іваноў, Ivanoŭ	Иванов, Ivanov	Іванів, Ivaniv

== Given names ==
East Slavic parents select a given name for a newborn child. Most first names in East Slavic languages originate from two sources:

- Eastern Orthodox Church tradition
- native pre-Christian Slavic lexicons

Almost all first names are single. Doubled first names (as in, for example, French, like Jean-Luc) are very rare and are from foreign influence. Most doubled first names are written with a hyphen: Mariya-Tereza.

=== Males ===
Belarusian variant	Russian variant	Ukrainian variant	Latin-alphabet transliteration (Note: The same romanization system is used for all three languages for comparative purposes. For the official romanization systems of Russian, Ukrainian, and Belarusian, which will be used throughout the rest of the article, see romanization of Russian, romanization of Ukrainian, and romanization of Belarusian, respectively.) (Belarusian / Russian / Ukrainian)	Origin	Comments
Іван, Ян	Иван, Ян	Іван, Ян	Ivan, Jan / Ivan / Ivan	Hebrew	equivalent to John
Якуб, Якаў	Иаков, Яков	Яків	Yakub, Yakau / Iakov, Yakov / Yakiv	Hebrew	equivalent to James or Jacob
Ілля	Илья	Ілля	Illa / Ilia / Illia	Hebrew	equivalent to Elijah
Мікалай, Мікола	Николай	Микола	Mikałaj, Mikoła / Nikolai / Mykola, Mykolai	Greek	equivalent to Nicholas, meaning "Victory (of the) People"
Мiкiта	Никита	Микита	Mikita / Nikita / Mykyta	Greek	equivalent to "Nicetas", meaning "victorious one" (from Nike "victory")
Барыс	Борис	Борис	Barys / Boris / Borys	Bulgar	unclear, possibly "wolf", "short" or "snow leopard"
Уладзімір	Владимир	Володимир	Uładzimir / Vladimir / Volodymyr	Slavonic	meaning "great/famous lord" (-мир comes from мѣръ and is not related to міръ or миръ, see also the name's etymology) Equivalent to Norse Valdemar
Пётр, Пятро, Пятрусь	Пётр	Петро	Piotr, Piatro, Piatruś / Petr, Pyotr / Petro	Greek	equivalent to Peter
Андрэй	Андрей	Андрій	Andrej / Andrei / Andrii	Greek	equivalent to Andrew
Аляксандр	Александр	Олександр, Олекса	Alaksandr / Aleksandr / Oleksandr, Oleksa	Greek	equivalent to Alexander
Піліп	Филипп	Пилип	Pilip / Filipp / Pylyp	Greek	from Greek Φίλιππος (Phílippos), meaning "fond of horses". Equivalent to Philip.
Дзмітры, Зміцер	Дмитрий	Дмитро	Dzmitry, Zmicier / Dmitrii / Dmytro	Greek	from Greek Δημήτριος (Demétrios), meaning "of Demeter"
Сяргей	Сергей	Сергій	Siarhiej / Sergei / Serhii	Latin	from the Roman nomen (patrician family name) Sergius, itself from a more ancient Etruscan name
Леанід, Лявон	Леонид	Леонід	Leanid, Lavon / Leonid / Leonid	Greek	from Greek Leonidas, meaning "Son of the Lion"
Віктар	Виктор	Віктор	Viktar / Viktor / Viktor	Latin	meaning "Conqueror"
Георгій, Юры	Георгий	Георгiй	Hieorhij, Jury / Georgii / Heorhii	Greek	the analogues are Russian: Егор, romanized: Yegor, Russian: Юрий, romanized: Yury, equivalent to George
Павел, Павал, Паўло	Павел	Павло	Pavał, Paŭło / Pavel / Pavlo	Latin	equivalent to Paul
Канстанцін, Кастусь	Константин	Костянтин	Kanstancin, Kastuś / Konstantin / Kostiantyn	Latin	equivalent to Constantine
Кірыл, Кірыла	Кирилл	Кирило	Kirył, Kiryła / Kirill / Kyrylo	Greek	equivalent to Cyril
Васіль, Базыль	Василий	Василь	Vasiĺ, Bazyl / Vasilii / Vasyl	Greek	equivalent to Basil
Раман	Роман	Роман	Raman / Roman / Roman	Latin	from Romanus
Уладзіслаў	Владислав	Владислав	Uladzisłaŭ / Vladislav / Vladyslav	Slavonic	meaning "Lord of Fame"
Вячаслаў	Вячеслав	В'ячеслав	Viačasłaŭ / Viacheslav / Viacheslav	Slavonic	meaning "Growing Fame"
Матвей, Мацвей	Матвей	Матвій	Matviej, Macviej / Matvei / Matvii	Hebrew	equivalent to Matthew
Міхал, Міхась	Михаил	Михайло	Michał, Michaś / Mikhail / Mykhailo	Hebrew	equivalent to Michael
Алег	Олег	Олег	Aleh / Oleg / Oleh	Old Norse	derivative from Scandinavian "Helgi"
Ігар	Игорь	Ігор	Ihar / Igor / Ihor	Old Norse	derivative from Scandinavian "Ingvar"
Максім	Максим	Максим	Maksim / Maksim / Maksym	Latin	meaning "Greatest"
Фёдар	Фёдор	Федiр	Fiodar / Fyodor / Fedir	Greek	equivalent to Theodore, meaning "God's gift" or "God-given"
Захар	Захар	Захар	Zachar / Zakhar / Zakhar	Hebrew	equivalent to Zachary, meaning "Remembered"
Аляксей	Алексей	Олексій	Alaksej / Aleksei / Oleksii	Greek	equivalent to Alexis, meaning "Defender"
Макар	Макар	Макар	Makar / Makar / Makar	Greek	meaning "Blessed"

=== Females ===
Belarusian variant	Russian variant	Ukrainian variant	Latin-alphabet transliteration (Belarusian / Russian / Ukrainian)	Origin	Comments
Настасся, Наста	Анастасия	Анастасія	Nastassia, Nasta / Anastasiya / Anastasiia	Greek	from Greek Ἀναστασία (Anastasia) meaning "she of the Resurrection"
Ангеліна	Ангелина	Ангеліна	Anhelina / Angelina / Anhelina	Greek	From Greek Ἀγγελίνα (Angelina) meaning "messenger"
Ганна	Анна	Ганна	Hanna / Anna / Hanna	Hebrew	equivalent to Anne or Hannah
Алена	Елена, Алёна	Oленa	Alena / Yelena, Alyona / Olena	Greek	equivalent to Helen; in Russian Alyona can be both a pet version of Yelena and a name in its own right
Марыя	Мария	Марія	Maryja / Mariya / Mariia	Hebrew	equivalent to Mary
Наталля	Наталья, Наталия	Наталя, Наталія	Natallia / Natalya / Nataliia	Latin	equivalent to Natalie
Вольга	Ольга	Ольга	Volha / Olga / Olha	Old Norse	derivative from Scandinavian Helga
Аляксандра	Александра	Олександра	Alaksandra / Aleksandra / Oleksandra	Greek	equivalent to Alexandra
Ксенія, Аксана	Ксения	Оксана	Ksienija, Aksana / Kseniya / Oksana	Greek	in Russian, Oksana is a separate name of the same origin
Кацярына	Екатерина	Катерина	Kaciaryna / Yekaterina / Kateryna	Greek	equivalent to Catherine
Лізавета	Елизавета	Єлизавета	Lizaveta / Yelizaveta / Ielyzaveta	Hebrew	equivalent to Elizabeth
Тацяна, Таццяна	Татьяна	Тетяна	Tacciana / Tatyana / Tetiana	Latin	derivative from the Latinized name of the Sabine king Titus Tatius
Людміла	Людмила	Людмила	Ludmila / Lyudmila / Liudmyla	Slavonic	meaning "Dear to the People"
Святлана	Светлана	Світлана	Sviatłana / Svetlana / Svitlana	Slavonic	meaning "The Shining One"
Юлія	Юлия	Юлія	Julija / Yuliya / Yuliia	Latin	equivalent to Julia or Julie
Вера	Вера	Віра	Vera / Vera / Vira	Slavonic	meaning "Faith"; a calque of the Greek Πίστη
Надзея	Надежда	Надія	Nadzeja / Nadezhda / Nadiia	Slavonic	meaning "Hope"; a calque of the Greek Ἐλπίς
Любоў	Любовь	Любов	Luboŭ / Lyubov / Liubоv	Slavonic	meaning "Love"; a calque of the Greek Ἀγάπη
Соф'я	София, Софья	Софія	Sofja / Sofiya, Sofya / Sofiia	Greek	equivalent to Sophia, meaning "Wisdom"

=== Forms ===
Being highly synthetic languages, the East Slavic ones treat personal names as grammatical nouns and apply the same rules of inflection and derivation to them as for other nouns. So one can create many forms with different degrees of affection and familiarity by adding the corresponding suffixes to the auxiliary stem derived from the original name. The auxiliary stem may be identical to the word stem of the full name (the full name Жанна Zhanna can have the suffixes added directly to the stem Жанн- Zhann- like Жанночка Zhannochka), and most names have the auxiliary stem derived unproductively (the Russian name Михаил, Mikhail has the auxiliary stem Миш-, Mish-, which produces such name-forms as Миша, (Misha), Мишенька, (Mishenka), Мишуня, (Mishunya) etc., not Михаилушка, (Mikhailushka)).

Unlike English, in which the use of diminutive forms is optional even between close friends, in East Slavonic languages, such forms are obligatory in certain contexts because of the strong T–V distinction: the T-form of address usually requires the short form of the counterpart's name. Also, unlike other languages with prominent use of name suffixes, such as Japanese, the use of derived name forms is mostly limited to the T-addressing: there is no way to make the name more formal than the plain unsuffixed full form, and usually no suffixes can be added to the family name.

Most commonly, Russian philologists distinguish the following forms of given names:

Name form	Example	Formation	Comments
Full	Анна, (Anna)	full name stem + case ending	-
Short	Аня, (Anya)	short name stem + II declension ending	most common for informal communication, comparable to Western name-only form of address (Ann, John), or Japanese surname-only, or surname/name -kun
Diminutive	Анька, (Anka)	short name stem + -к-, -k- + II declension ending	expresses familiarity, may be considered rude when used between people who are not close friends. Comparable to English diminutives (Annie, Willy) or Japanese unsuffixed names
Affective diminutive	Анечка, (Anyechka)	short name stem + -ечк/очк/оньк/усь/юсь/уль/юль-, -echk/ochk/on'k/us/yus/ul/yul- + II declension ending	most intimate and affectionate form, comparable to German diminutives (Ännchen) or Japanese -chan suffixes

==== Short forms ====
Николай II, (Nicholas II), the last Russian emperor. In private, his wife addressed him as Nicki, in the German manner, rather than Коля (Kolya), which is the East Slavic short form of his name.

The "short name" (краткое имя, kratkoye imya, historically also "half-name" (полуимя, poluimya), is the simplest and most common name derivative. Bearing no suffix, it is produced irregularly and always has the II declension noun ending for both males and females, thus making short forms of certain unisex names indistinguishable: for example, Sasha (Russian: Саша) is the short name for both the masculine name Aleksandr and the feminine form Aleksandra.

Some names, such as Zhanna and Mark, have no short forms; others may have two or more different forms. In the latter case, one form is usually more informal than the others.

Full name (Cyrillic script)	Full name (Latin script)	Short forms (Cyrillic)	Short forms (Latin)
Александр	Aleksandr (m)	Саша, Саня, Шура, ukr. Сашко, Лесь	Sasha, Sanya, Shura, ukr. Sashko, Les
Александра	Aleksandra (f)	Саша, Шура, ukr. Леся	Sasha, Shura, ukr. Lesia
Алексей	Aleksey (m)	Алёша, Лёша	Alyosha, Lyosha
Анастасия	Anastasia (f)	Настя, Стася	Nastya, Stasya (rare)
Анатолий	Anatoly (m)	Толя	Tolya
Андрей	Andrey (m)	Андрюша, Дюша, Андря	Andryusha, Dyusha, Andrya (rare)
Анна	Anna (f)	Аня, Анюта, Нюта, Нюша	Anya, Anyuta, Nyuta, Nyusha
Борис	Boris (m)	Боря	Borya
Давид	David (m)	Дава	Dava
Даниил	Daniil (m)	Данила, Даня	Danila, Danya
Дарья	Darya (f)	Даша	Dasha
Дмитрий	Dmitry (m)	Дима, Митя	Dima, Mitya
Галина	Galina (f)	Галя	Galya
Геннадий	Gennady (m)	Гена	Gena
Георгий	Georgy (m)	Гоша, Жора	Gosha, Zhora
Григорий	Grigory (m)	Гриша	Grisha
Иван	Ivan (m)	Ваня	Vanya
Иммануил	Immanuil (m)	Моня	Monya
Ирина	Irina (f)	Ира	Ira
Кирилл	Kirill (m)	Кира, Киря	Kira, Kirya
Константин	Konstantin (m)	Костя	Kostya
Ксения	Ksenya (f)	Ксюша	Ksyusha
Лариса	Larisa (f)	Лара, Лёля	Lara, Lyolya (rare)
Леонид	Leonid (m)	Лёня	Lyonya
Лев	Lev (m)	Лёва	Lyova
Лидия	Lidiya (f)	Лида	Lida
Любовь	Lyubov' (f)	Люба	Lyuba
Людмила	Lyudmila (f)	Люда, Люся, Мила	Lyuda, Lyusya, Meela (rare)
Мария	Mariya (f)	Маша, Маня, Маруся, Машуля, Машенька, Марийка, Маняша, Марічка	Masha, Manya, Marusya, Mashulya, Mashеnka, Mariyka, Manyasha (rare), Marichka (ukr.)
Матвей	Matvey (m)	Мотя	Motya
Михаил	Mihail (m)	Миша	Misha
Надежда	Nadezhda (f)	Надя	Nadya
Наталья	Natalya (f)	Наташа	Natasha
Николай	Nikolay (m)	Коля	Kolya
Ольга	Olga (f)	Оля	Olya
Павел	Pavel (m)	Паша, Павлик	Pasha, Pavlik
Полина	Polina (f)	Поля, Лина	Polya, Lina (rare)
Пётр	Pyotr (m)	Петя	Petya
Роман	Roman (m)	Рома	Roma
Семён	Semyon (m)	Сёма	Syoma
Сергей	Sergey (m)	Серёжа	Seryozha
София	Sofia, Sofya (f)	Соня, Софа	Sonya, Sofa
Светлана	Svetlana (f)	Света, Лана	Sveta, Lana
Станислав	Stanislav (m)	Стас	Stas, Stanko
Тамара	Tamara (f)	Тома	Toma
Татьяна	Tatyana (f)	Таня	Tanya
Вадим	Vadim (m)	Вадик, Вадя, Вадос, Дима	Vadik, Vadya, Vados, Dima (rare)
Валентин / Валентина	Valentin (m) / Valentina (f)	Валя	Valya
Валерий	Valery (m)	Валера	Valera
Валерия	Valeriya (f)	Лера	Lera
Василий	Vasily (m)	Вася	Vasya
Виктор	Viktor (m)	Витя	Vitya
Виктория	Viktoriya (f)	Вика	Vika
Виталия	Vitaliya (f)	Вита	Vita
Владимир	Vladimir (m)	Вова, Володя	Vova, Volodya
Владислав, Владислава	Vladislav (m), Vladislava (f)	Влад, Влада	Vlad, Vlada
Вячеслав	Vyacheslav (m)	Слава	Slava
Ярослав	Yaroslav (m)	Ярик	Yarik
Елена	Yelena (f)	Лена, Алёна	Lena, Alyona
Елизавета	Yelizaveta (f)	Лиза	Liza
Екатерина	Yekaterina (f)	Катя	Katya
Евгений / Евгения	Yevgeniy (m) / Yevgeniya (f)	Женя	Zhenya
Юлия	Yuliya (f)	Юля	Yulya
Юрий	Yury (m)	Юра	Yura
Яков	Yakov (m)	Яша	Yasha

==== Diminutive forms ====
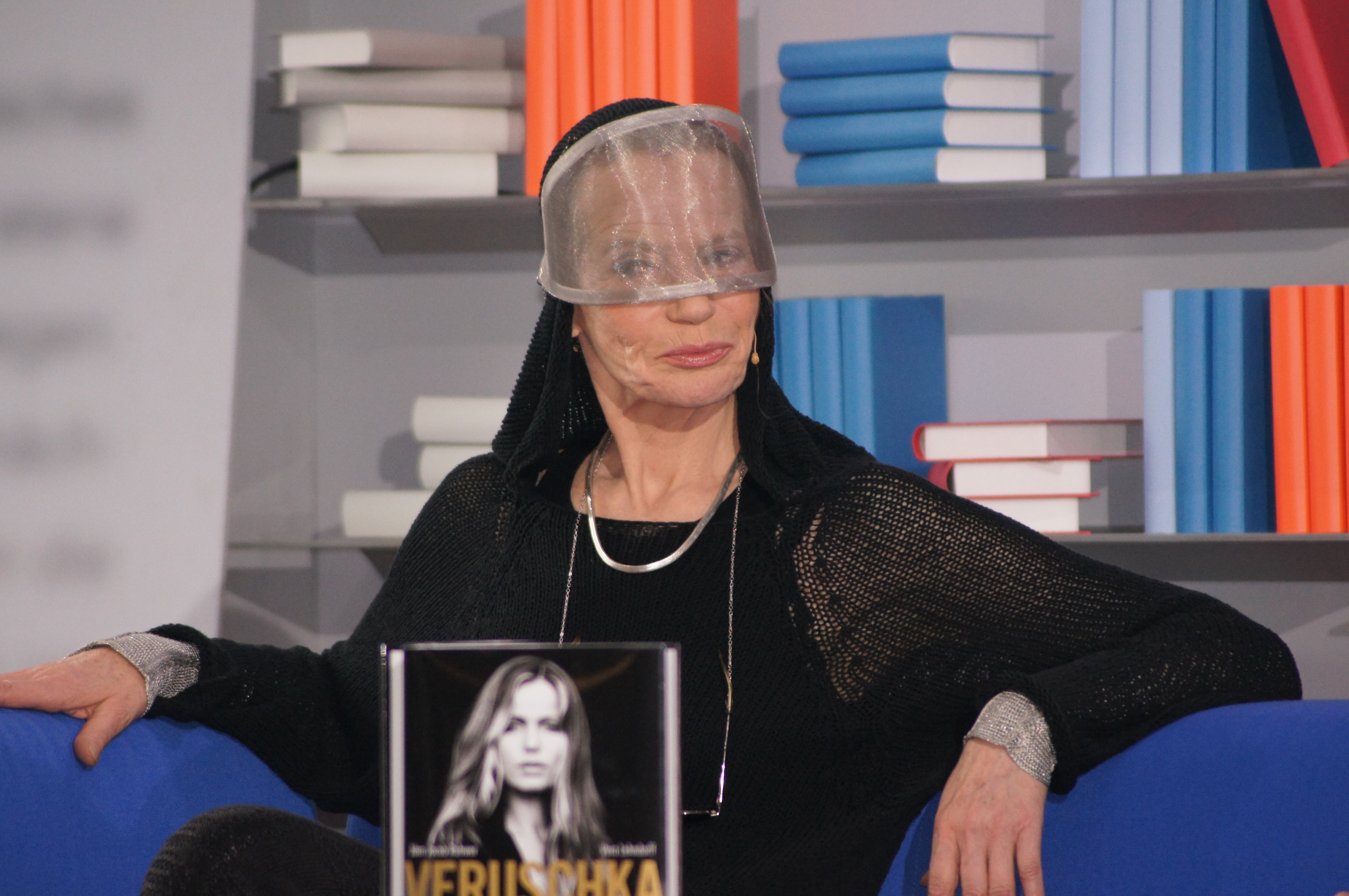
Veruschka, a German model, actress and artist. "Veruschka" is the German spelling the hypocoristic Верушка of her given name Vera.

Diminutive forms are produced from the "short name" by means of various suffixes; for example, Михаил Mikhail (full) – Миша Misha (short) – Мишенька Mishenka (affectionate) – Мишка Mishka (colloquial). If no "short name" exists, then diminutive forms are produced from the full form of the respective first name; for example, Марина Marina (full) – Мариночка Marinochka (affectionate) – Маринка Marinka (colloquial). Unlike the full name, a diminutive name carries a particular emotional attitude and may be unacceptable in certain contexts. Depending on the nature of the attitude, diminutive name forms can be subdivided into three broad groups: affectionate, familiar, and slang.

===== Affectionate diminutive =====
Typically formed by suffixes -еньк- (-yenk-), -оньк- (-onk-), -ечк- (-yechk-), -ушк (-ushk), as illustrated by the examples below. It generally emphasises a tender, affectionate attitude and is roughly analogous to German suffixes -chen, -lein, Japanese -chan and -tan and affectionate name-derived nicknames in other languages. It is often used to address children or intimate friends.

Within a more official context, this form may be combined with the honorific plural to address a younger female colleague.

Full form	Short form	Diminutive form
(Cyrillic/Latin)
Анна/Anna	Аня/Anya	Анечка/Anyechka
Виктор/Viktor	Витя/Vitya	Витенька/Vitenʲka
Дмитрий/Dmitry	Дима/Dima	Димочка/Dimochka
Ольга/Olga	Оля/Olya	Оленька/Olyenka
Степан/Stepan	Стёпа/Styopa	Стёпочка/Styopochka

===== Colloquial diminutives =====
Colloquial diminutives are derived from short names by the -к- ("-k-") suffix. Expressing a highly familiar attitude, the use may be considered rude or even pejorative outside a friendly context.

Full form		Short form		Colloquial diminutive form	
(Cyrillic)	(Latin)	(Cyrillic)	(Latin)	(Cyrillic)	(Latin)
Анна	Anna	Аня	Anya	Анька	Anʲka
Виктор	Viktor	Витя	Vitya	Витька	Vitʲka
Дмитрий	Dmitry	Дима	Dima	Димка	Dimka
Ольга	Olga	Оля	Olya	Олька	Olʲka
Степан	Stepan	Стёпа	Styopa	Стёпка	Styopka

===== Slang forms =====
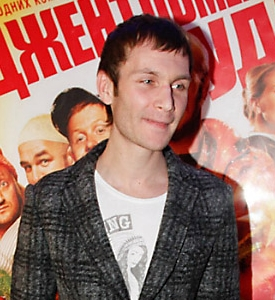
Колян (Kolyan), a character in the sitcom Реальные пацаны (Realnye Patsany, Real Lads). Kolyan shows viewers the ridiculous side of the life of gopniks, a subculture similar to British chavs.

Slang forms exist for male names and, since a few decades ago, female names. They are formed with the suffixes -ян (-yan), -он (-on), and -ок/ёк (-ok/yok). The suffixes give the sense of "male brotherhood" that was once expressed by the patronymic-only form of address in the Soviet Union.

Full form		Short form		Slang form	
(Cyrillic)	(Latin)	(Cyrillic)	(Latin)	(Cyrillic)	(Latin)
Анатолий	Anatoly	Толя	Tolya	Толян	Tolyan
Николай	Nikolay	Коля	Kolya	Колян	Kolyan
Дмитрий	Dmitry	Дима	Dima	Димон	Dimon
Владимир	Vladimir	Вова	Vova	Вован	Vovan
Александр	Alexander	Саня	Sanya	Санёк	Sanyok
Татьяна	Tatiana	Таня	Tanya	Танюха	Tanyukha
Андрей	Andrey	Андрюша	Andryusha	Андрюха	Andryukha

=== Early Soviet Union ===
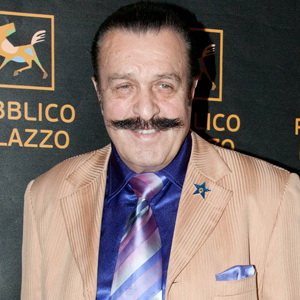
Vilen "Willi" Tokarev was "octobered" with the name Vilen after V.I. Lenin

During the days of the October Revolution, as part of the campaign to rid Russia of bourgeois culture, there was a drive to invent new, revolutionary names. As a result, many Soviet children were given atypical names, often being acronyms/initialisms.

Name (Cyrillic)	Name (Latin)	Origin	Comments
Вил, Вилен, Владлен, Владлена	Vil, Vilen, Vladilen Vladlen (m) / Vladlena (f)	Владимир Ильич Ленин (Vladimir Ilyich Lenin)	
Мэл(c)	Mel/Mels	Маркс, Энгельс, Ленин (и Сталин) (Marx, Engels, Lenin (and Stalin))	
Баррикада	Barrikada	-	"Barricade" - refers to the revolutionary activity
Ревмир, Ревмира	Revmir (m) / Revmira (f)	Революция мира (Revolyutsiya mira)	Means "The World Revolution"
Гертруда	Gertruda	Gertrude reinterpreted as Герой труда (Geroy truda)	Means "The Hero of Labour"
Марлен	Marlen	Marlene reinterpreted as Маркс и Ленин (Marx and Lenin)	
Стэн	Sten	Stan reinterpreted as Сталин и Энгельс (Stalin and Engels)	
Ким	Kim	Kim reinterpreted as Коммунистический интернационал молодёжи (Kommunistichesky Internatsional Molodyozhi)	Means "Young Communist International"

== Patronymics ==
The patronymic name is based on the given name of the father and is written in all legal and identity documents. If used with the given name, the patronymic always follows it; but it is not analogous to an English middle name.

=== Usage ===
The patronymic name is obligatory when addressing a person of higher social stance and/or on special occasions such as business meetings; for example, when a pupil addresses a teacher, they are obliged to use both first and patronymic names – Russian: Марья Ивановна, могу я спросить..., lit. 'Marya Ivanovna, may I ask...'. Not using patronymic names in such situations is considered offensive.

Addressing a person by patronymic name only is widespread among older generations and serves as a display of close relationship based on not only sympathy but also mutual responsibility.

In speech patronymics are commonly truncated and it is not considered to be a colloquialism, e.g., written "Ivan Ivanovich" may be pronounced "as is", as well as "Ivan Ivanych".

In the past of East Slavs, before the introduction of surnames, noble, wealthy, or otherwise respected people were addressed by name plus patronymic, see, e.g., "Yaroslavich"/"Yaroslavna". From this custom a number of surnames of West Ruthenian origin was produced, such as Antonovich or Prokopovich, which in their turn derived Polish surnames, such as Antonowicz or Prokopowicz (the Ruthenian origin is recognized by the suffix -wicz: the corresponding native (now archaic) Polish suffix was '-wic': Szymonowic, Klonowic).

For commoners, when the distinction among people with the same given name was required, a qualifier "son of..." was usually added: "Ивашка, Антонов сын" ("Ivashka, Antonov syn", i.e., 'Ivashka, son of Anton'). From the latter tradition Russian patronymic surnames ending in "-ov/-ev/yov" originated, in this case, Antonov".

=== Derivation ===
Name	Masculine patronym	Feminine patronym
Anatoly	Anatolyevich	Anatolyevna
Konstantin	Konstantinovich	Konstantinovna
Dmitry	Dmitriyevich	Dmitriyevna
Ilya	Ilyich	Ilyinichna
Ivan	Ivanovich	Ivanovna
Nikolay	Nikolayevich	Nikolayevna
Vladimir	Vladimirovich	Vladimirovna
Yakov	Yakovlevich	Yakovleva / Yakovlevna

The patronymic is formed by a combination of the father's name and suffixes. The suffix is -ович (-ovich) for a son, -овна (-ovna) – for a daughter. For example, if the father's name was Иван (Ivan), the patronymic will be Иванович (Ivanovich) for a son and Ивановна (Ivanovna) for a daughter.

If the suffix is being appended to a name ending in a й ("y") or a soft consonant, the initial o in the suffixes -ович (-ovich) and -овна (-ovna) becomes a е ("ye") and the suffixes change to -евич (-yevich) and -евна (-yevna). For example, if the father is Дмитрий (Dmitry), the patronymic is Дмитриевич (Dmitrievich) for a son and Дмитриевна (Dmitrievna) for a daughter. It is not Дмитрович (Dmitrovich) or Дмитровна (Dmitrovna) because the name Дмитрий (Dmitry) ends on "й" ("y");

For some names ending in a vowel, the suffix is -ич (-ich) for a son and -ична (-ichna) or -инична (-inichna) for a daughter; for example, Фока Foka (father's first name) – Фокич Fokich (male patronymic) – Фокична Fokichna (female patronymic); Кузьма Kuzma (father's first name) – Кузьмич Kuzmich (male patronymic) – Кузьминична Kuzminichna (female patronymic).

=== Historical grounds ===
Historical Russian naming conventions did not include surnames. A person's name included that of their father: e.g. Иван Петров сын (Ivan Petrov syn) which means "Ivan, son of Peter". That is the origin of most Russian -ov surnames.

From the 17th century, the second name with suffix -ович (-ovich) was the privilege given by the tsar to commoners. For example, in 1610, Tsar Vasili IV gave to the Stroganovs, who were merchants, the privilege to use patronyms. As a tribute for developing the salt industry in Siberia, Pyotr Stroganov and all his issues were allowed to have a name with -ovich. The tsar wrote in the chart dated on 29 May, "... to write him with ovich, to try [him] in Moscow only, not to fee [him] by other fees, not to kiss a cross by himself [which means not to swear during any processions]" In the 18th century, it was the only family of merchants to have patronyms. By the 19th century, the -ovich form eventually became the default form of a patronymic.

=== Legal basis ===
Everyone in Russia, Ukraine, and Belarus is supposed to have a tripartite name. Single mothers may give their children any patronym, and this does not have any legal consequences. Foreigners who adopt Russian citizenship are exempted from having a patronym. Now, an adult person is entitled to change patronyms if necessary, such as to alienate themselves from the biological father (or to show respect for the adopted one) as well as to decide the same for an underage child.

=== Matronymic ===
In modern Russia, there are cases when women raising a child without a father give the child their own name instead of a patronymic (Russian: матчество, матроним, romanized: matchestvo, matronim, lit. 'matronymic'). This practice is not recognized by law, but the civil registry offices may meet such wishes. A common loophole is when the mother's name is a feminine form of a masculine given name, the mother will give the child the patronym of the masculine equivalent.

== Family names ==
Family names are generally used like in English.

=== Derivation and meaning ===
In Russian, some common suffixes are -ов (-ov), -ев (-yev), meaning "belonging to" or "of the clan of/descendant of", e.g. Petrov = of the clan of/descendant of Petr (Peter), usually used for patronymic surnames—or -ский (-sky), an adjectival form, meaning "associated with" and usually used for toponymic surnames. Historically, toponymic surnames may have been granted as a token of nobility; for example, the princely surname Shuysky is indicative of the princedom based on the ownership of Shuya. Prince Grigory Aleksandrovich Potemkin-Tavricheski had the victory title 'Tavricheski', as part of his surname, granted to him for the annexation of Crimea by the Russian Empire.

In the 19th and early 20th centuries, -off was a common transliteration of -ov for Russian family names in foreign languages such as French and German (like for the Smirnoff and the Davidoff brands).

Surnames of Ukrainian and Belarusian origin use the suffixes -ко (-ko), -ук (-uk), and -ич (-ych). For example, the family name Писаренко (Pisarenko) is derived from the word for a scribe, and Ковальчук (Kovalchuk) refers to a smith.

Less often, some versions of family names will have no suffix, e.g. Lebed, meaning swan, and Zhuk, meaning beetle (but see also Lebedev and Zhukov).

Hyphenated surnames like Petrov-Vodkin are possible.

There is also a plural form used when referring to the family as a whole or several members of it (as opposed to a single member). For "–ов/–ев/-ёв" (-ov/-yev/-yov) it is "–овы/–евы/-ёвы" (-ovy/-yevy/-yovy), for "–ин" (-in) the form is "–ины" (-iny) and for "–ий/-ой/-ый" (-iy/-oy/-yy) it is "–ие/-ые" (-iye/-yye).

=== Grammar ===
The Coat of Arms of the Романовы (Romanovs), the last Russian royal dynasty. The family name Романов (Romanov) means "pertaining to (the name) Roman".

East Slavic languages are synthetic languages and have grammatical cases and grammatical gender. Unlike analytic languages like English, which use prepositions ("to", "at", "on" etc.) to show the links and relations between words in a sentence, East Slavic suffixes are used much more broadly than prepositions. Words need the help of some suffix to integrate them into the sentence and to build a grammatically correct sentence. That includes names, unlike in German. Family names are declined based on the Slavic case system.

The surnames that originally are short (-ov, -ev, -in) or full (-iy/-oy/-yy) Slavic adjectives, have different forms depending on gender: male forms -ov, -ev, -in and -iy/-oy/-yy correspond to female forms -ova, -eva, -ina and -aya, respectively. For example, the wife of Борис Ельцин (Boris Yel'tsin) was Наина Ельцина (Naina Yel'tsina); the wife of Leo Tolstoy was Sophia Tolstaya, etc. All other, i.e. non-adjectival, surnames stay the same for both genders (including surnames ending with -енко (-yenko), -ич (-ich) etc.), unlike in many West Slavic languages, where the non-adjectival surname of men corresponds to the derivative feminine adjectival surname (Novák → Nováková). Note the difference between patronymics and surnames ending with -ich: surnames are the same for males and females, but patronymics are gender-dependent (for example, Ivan Petrovich Mirovich and Anna Petrovna Mirovich).

This dependence of grammatical gender of adjectival surname on the gender of its owner is not considered to be changing the surname (compare the equivalent rule in Polish, for example). The correct transliteration of such feminine surnames in English is debated: the names technically should be in their original form, but they sometimes appear in the masculine form.

The example of Иванов (Ivanov), a family name, will be used:

Grammatical case	Example of question	Masculine form		Feminine form	
Grammatical case	Example of question	Cyrillic	Latin	Cyrillic	Latin
Nominative	Who?	Иванов	Ivanov	Иванова	Ivanova
Genitive	Whose?	Иванова	Ivanova	Ивановой	Ivanovoy
Dative	To whom?	Иванову	Ivanovu	Ивановой	Ivanovoy
Accusative	Whom?	Иванова	Ivanova	Иванову	Ivanovu
Instrumental	By whom?	Ивановым	Ivanovym	Ивановой	Ivanovoy
Locative (Prepositional)	About whom?	Иванове	Ivanove	Ивановой	Ivanovoy

The surnames which are not grammatically adjectives (Zhuk, Gogol, Barchuk, Kupala etc.) decline according to case and number as the corresponding common noun. The exception is when a woman has a surname which is grammatically a noun of masculine gender; in such case, the surname is not declined. For example, Ivan and Anna Zhuk in dative case ("to whom?") would be: Ивану Жуку (Ivanu Zhuku), but Анне Жук (Anne Zhuk).

Family names are generally inherited from one's parents. As in English, women usually adopt the surname of the husband upon marriage; the opposite, when the husband adopts the maiden surname of his wife, occurs very seldom. Occasionally, both spouses keep their pre-marriage family names. A fourth option, very rare but still legal, is to take on a double surname; for example, in a given marriage between Ivanov (he) and Petrovskaya (she), the spouses may adopt the family names Ivanov-Petrovsky and Ivanova-Petrovskaya, respectively.

== Slavicisation of foreign names ==
=== Slavicisation of foreign surnames ===
Some surnames in those languages have been Russified since the 19th century: the surname of Kazakh former president Nursultan Nazarbayev has a Russian "-yev" suffix, which literally means "of Nazar-bay" (in which "bay" is a Turkic native noble rank: compare Turkish "bey", Uzbek "boy" "bek", and Kyrghyz "bek"). The frequency of such Russification varies greatly by country.

After the incorporation of Azerbaijan into the Soviet Union, it became obligatory to register their surnames and to add a Russian suffix such as -yev or -ov for men and -yeva or -ova for women. Since the majority did not have official surnames, the problem was resolved by adopting the name of the father and adding the mentioned suffixes. Examples are Aliyev, Huseynov, and Mammadov. After Azerbaijan gained its independence, the Azerbaijanization of surnames has been pursued.

Since the 1930s and 1940s, surnames and patronymics were obligatory in Uzbekistan. The surname could be derived from the name of the father by adding the suffixes -ev after vowels or soft consonants and -ov in all other cases. Examples are Rashidov, Beknazarov and Abdullaev. Most of the people born in this time had the same surname as their patronymic.

=== Slavicisation of foreign patronymics ===
By law, foreign persons who adopt Russian citizenship are allowed to have no patronymic. Some adopt non-Slavonic patronymics as well. For example, the Russian politician Irina Hakamada's patronym is Муцуовна (Mutsuovna) because her Japanese father's given name was Mutsuo. The ethnicity of origin generally remains recognizable in Russified names. Other examples are Kazakh ұлы (uly; transcribed into Latin script as -uly, as in Nursultan Abishuly Nazarbayev), or Azeri оглы/оғлу (oglu) (as in Heydar Alirza oglu Aliyev); Kazakh қызы (transcribed into Latin script as -qyzy, as in Dariga Nursultanqyzy Nazarbayeva). Such Turkic patronymics were officially allowed in the Soviet Union.

Bruno Pontecorvo, after he emigrated to the Soviet Union, was known as Бруно Максимович Понтекорво (Bruno Maximovich Pontekorvo) in the Russian scientific community, as his father's given name was Massimo (corresponding to Russian Максим (Maksim)). His sons have been known by names Джиль Брунович Понтекорво (Dzhil Brunovich Pontecorvo), Антонио Брунович Понтекорво (Antonio Brunovich Pontecorvo) and Тито Брунович Понтекорво (Tito Brunovich Pontekorvo).

== Forms of address ==
=== Common rules ===
- For informal communication, only the first name is used: Иван Ivan. Even more informally, diminutives (several can be formed from one name) are often used.
- In rural areas, the patronymic name alone (Петрович Petrovich, Ивановна Ivanovna) is used by old people among themselves, but young people sometimes use the form for irony. Also, younger people can use the form for much older people for both respect and informality. For example, a much younger man with a very good relationship with his elder colleague may use a patronymic and the "ty" form, but using the first name alone is generally inappropriate. Using a diminutive (like in most informal communication) would nearly always be very impolite.
- The family name alone (Петров, Petrov) is used, much more rarely, in formal communications. It is commonly used by school teachers to address their students. Informally, Russians are starting to call people by their surnames alone for irony.
- the form "first name + patronymic" (for instance, Иван Иванович, Ivan Ivanovich):
  - is the feature of official communication (for instance, students in schools and universities call their teachers in the form of "first name + patronymic" only);
  - may convey the speaker's respect for the recipient. Historically, patronymics were reserved for the royal dynasty (Рюриковичи, Ruerikovichi)
- The full three-name form (for instance, Иван Иванович Петров Ivan Ivanovich Petrov) is used mostly for official documents. With some exceptions, everyone in Russia, Ukraine, and Belarus is supposed to have a three-part name. This form is also used on formal occasions and for introducing oneself to a person who is likely to write down the full name, like a police officer. The family name is placed first (Петров Иван Иванович, Petrov Ivan Ivanovich) in various documents, when sorting by personal name is important.

Historically, diminutives of the given names were used in reference to commoners, to indicate an their low status: Stenka Razin, Grishka Rasputin, etc. A diminutive could be used by persons of a higher class when referring to themselves to indicate humility, e.g., when addressing to the tsar.

The choice of addressing format is closely linked to the choice of second-person pronoun. Russian language distinguishes:

- formal вы (vy, "you"); respectful Вы ("Vy", "You") may be capitalized in formal correspondence, but plural вы ("vy", "you") is not.
- informal ты (ty, "you", "thou" in old English);

Вы ("Vy") is the plural of both forms to address a pair or group. Historically, it comes from German, under Peter the Great, which uses du and Sie similarly.

Other than the use of patronymics, Russian forms of address in Russian are very similar to English ones.

Also, the meaning of the form of address strongly depends on the choice of a V-T form:

Vy or ty	Form	Male example	Female example	Use
Using "Vy"	Full three-name form	Anatoliy Pavlovich Ivanov	Varvara Mikhailovna Kuznetsova	Official documents, very formal occasions (when necessary)
Using "Vy"	First name + patronymic	Anatoliy Pavlovich	Varvara Mikhailovna	General formal or respectful form
Using "Vy"	Surname	Ivanov	Kuznetsova	Formal. Often used by a person of a higher social position (like a teacher talking to a student)
Using "Vy"	Informal first name + informal patronymic	Tol' Palych	Varvara Mikhalna	Respectful but less formal
Using "Vy"	Full first name	Anatoliy	Varvara	Respectful but less formal
Using "Vy"	Diminutive first name	Tolya	Varya	Friendly but still somewhat formal
Using "Vy"	Affectionate first name		Varechka	Used almost exclusively towards women, showing fondness but still keeping some formality (like to a younger colleague)
Using "Ty"	First name + patronymic	Anatoliy Pavlovich	Varvara Mikhailovna	Can be used between friends on semi-formal occasions or ironically
Using "Ty"	Informal patronymic	Palych	Mikhalna	Combining familiarity and respect
Using "Ty"	Surname	Ivanov	Kuznetsova	Similar in use to a "vy" form but less formal
Using "Ty"	Full first name	Anatoliy	Varvara	Friendly but with a tone of formality. If the name has no diminutive form (Yegor), also used informally
Using "Ty"	Diminutive first name	Tolia	Varya	General informal form
Using "Ty"	Colloquial first name	Tolik	Var'ka	Very familiar form
Using "Ty"	Slang first name	Tolyan	Varyukha	Very familiar form
Using "Ty"	Affectionate first name	Tolen'ka	Varechka	Tender, affectionate form

Using a "ty" form with a person who dislikes it or on inappropriate occasions can be an insult, especially the surname alone.

== See also ==
- Religious name
- Romanization of Russian
- Russian given name
- Russian surnames of illegitimate children
- Slavic names
- Slavic name suffixes
- Surnames of Russian Orthodox clergy
- Ukrainian name
