= Adlen =

Adlen is an English surname and a forename used in Maghrebi Arabic-, English- and some Russian-speaking contexts. As a surname it derives from Old English roots associated with nobility and protection, though it has also been explained as a variant of Aitken linked to the name Adam (see Etymology below). As a forename (also spelled Adlène in Francophone usage) it is typically masculine in the Maghreb, from Arabic roots associated with justice and fairness (ʿadl, "to act justly"). Notable people with the name include:

- Adlene Harrison (1923–2022), American politician, first Jewish woman to serve as mayor of a major U.S. city
- Michel Adlen (1898–1980), Russian-born painter of Jewish origin, engraver of the École de Paris
- Adlen Griche (born 1979), Algerian former footballer
- Adlene Guedioura (born 1985), French-born Algerian international footballer

== Etymology and usage ==
=== English surname ===
The surname Adlen has been recorded in England — principally in Somerset — with genealogical sources tracing the family's presence there to before the Norman Conquest of 1066. It is explained in that literature as deriving from Old English adel ("noble") and helm ("helmet", "protection"), with the sense "noble protector"; related variant spellings include Adlam, Adlum, Adelhelm, and Eadhelm. By the 1921 census, most Adlens in Britain lived in London; the most common given names among them were William, Henry, Annie, and Elizabeth.

An alternative etymology holds that Adlen is a variant of Aitken or Aitkin, derived from a diminutive form of the Hebrew name Adam ("man" or "mankind"), signifying "little Adam" or "son of Adam".

Known people with the surname include Sam Adlen, a British space-industry executive, co-founder and co-CEO of the space-based solar power company Space Solar. Ella Adlen is a researcher at the Oxford Martin School and co-author of a widely cited 2019 Nature paper on carbon dioxide removal.

=== American usage ===
One early documented American bearer of the surname is Danll Adlen, recorded as arriving in Virginia in 1666. The forename Adlene appears in American records from the early 20th century, peaking in the 1920s. In English, Adlene has also been used as a feminine form and may alternatively be a simplified spelling of Adeline ("noble").

Adlene Harrison (born Adlene Nathanson, 1923–2022) was an American politician from Dallas, Texas. Harrison, who was the daughter of Russian Jewish immigrants, became Dallas's first female and first Jewish mayor. The Jewish Women's Archive records her as the first Jewish woman to serve as mayor of a major American city.

=== Maghrebi and Jewish usage ===
Bearers such as Adlen Griche (Arabic: عدلان قريش; born in Constantine, Algeria) and Adlene Guedioura (Arabic: عدلان قديورة; born 1985 in La Roche-sur-Yon, France), an Algerian international footballer who appeared at the 2010 FIFA World Cup and won the 2019 Africa Cup of Nations, illustrate the name's use among Algerian and wider Maghrebi communities. The Arabic script form عدلان is standardly romanized as Adlan; Adlen and Adlène are French-influenced latinizations more common in North African and Francophone contexts.

From the 19th century, Jewish communities in Morocco, Algeria, and Tunisia adopted hereditary surnames derived from Arabic given names. The surname Adlani (also El Adlani), a patronymic derived from Adlen/Adlan, is concentrated in Morocco and Algeria; Sephardic genealogical records list it among names in ketubot from both countries. Because such names were shared across religious lines in the Maghreb, they are not exclusively Jewish coinages — Alexander Beider's A Dictionary of Jewish Surnames from Maghreb, Gibraltar, and Malta documents names of this kind that are borne by both Jews and non-Jews.

=== Russian and potential Soviet usage ===
Michel Adlen (Russian: Михаил Захарьевич Адлен; born 1898–1980) was a Jewish painter born in the Russian Empire — sources give his birthplace as either Lutsk (now in western Ukraine) or Saky (now in Crimea) — who trained in Vienna and Berlin before settling in Paris. There he became a representative of the École de Paris, worked as an illustrator for Parisian magazines from 1929 to 1939, and founded the Jewish Painters and Sculptors Association. His works are held in museums in Moscow, Kyiv, and the Musée national des Arts et Traditions populaires in Paris.

The ending -len has also led to speculation that the forename Adlen could be a Soviet commemorative coinage of the kind that produced Vladlen (an abbreviation of Vladimir Lenin), and Vilen. Names ending in -len were sometimes parsed as incorporating Lenin (compare Arlen, a Soviet coinage from ARmiya LENina, "Lenin's army"). However, Adlen has no entry in major Soviet onomastic dictionaries.

== See also ==
- Adlène
- Vladlen
- Adeline (given name)
- Jean-Michel Atlan — Algerian-born Jewish painter of the École de Paris
