= Battlestar Galactica (1978 TV series) =

Sci-fi television series (1978–1979)

- Battlestar Galactica intro
- Genre: Science fiction; Space opera; Action adventure
- Created by: Glen A. Larson
- Starring: Richard Hatch; Dirk Benedict; Lorne Greene; John Colicos; Maren Jensen; Noah Hathaway; Herbert Jefferson Jr.; Tony Swartz; Laurette Spang; Terry Carter; Anne Lockhart
- Composer: Stu Phillips
- Country of origin: United States
- Original language: English
- No. of seasons: 1
- No. of episodes: 24 (list of episodes)

Production
- Running time: 45 minutes
- Production companies: Glen A. Larson Productions; Universal Television

Original release
- Network: ABC
- Release: September 17, 1978 – April 29, 1979

Related
- Galactica 1980; Battlestar Galactica (reimagined series)

Battlestar Galactica is an American science fiction television series created by Glen A. Larson that aired on the ABC network from September 17, 1978, to April 29, 1979. It stars an ensemble cast led by Lorne Greene, Richard Hatch, and Dirk Benedict. The series follows a group of humans fleeing the destruction of their homeworlds aboard the titular spacecraft, searching for a new home while being pursued by the Cylons, a fearsome society of robots intent on exterminating all humans.

Beginning production as a miniseries, ABC subsequently ordered a full season and the show was reworked as an episodic serial. However, high production costs and declining ratings led to the series' cancellation after 24 episodes. ABC attempted to revive the series as a lower-budget spinoff, Galactica 1980, but it performed poorly and was cancelled after airing ten episodes. Despite initially failing to find a wide audience, Battlestar Galactica developed a cult following. The show spawned a media franchise which includes comics, theme park attractions, games, and a re-imagined series in the early 2000s.

== Series overview ==
Season	Episodes	Originally released	
Season	Episodes	First released	Last released
Battlestar Galactica	24 (Note: The series consist of a three-hour pilot movie "Saga of a Star World" plus 21 episodes. The pilot movie was split into three one-hour episodes for syndication.)	September 17, 1978	April 29, 1979
Galactica 1980	10	January 27, 1980	May 4, 1980

In a distant star system, the Twelve Colonies of Mankind were reaching the end of a thousand-year war with the Cylons, warrior robots created by a reptilian race that expired long ago, presumably destroyed by their own creations. Humanity was ultimately defeated in a sneak attack on the colonies by the Cylons, carried out with the help of a human traitor, Baltar. Protected by the last surviving capital warship, a battlestar named Galactica, the survivors fled in available ships. The Commander of the Galactica, Adama, led this "rag-tag fugitive fleet" of 220 ships in search of a new home. They begin a quest to find the long lost thirteenth tribe of humanity that had settled on a legendary planet called Earth. The Cylons continue to pursue them relentlessly across the galaxy. The main characters include Captain Apollo, a Colonial fighter pilot who is Adama's son. His best friend is Lieutenant Starbuck, a highly regarded fighter pilot, and also a gambler and womanizer.

The era in which this exodus took place is never clearly stated in the series itself. At the start of the series, it is mentioned as being "the seventh millennium of time", although it is unknown when this is in relation to Earth's history. The final aired episode, "The Hand of God", indicates that the original series took place after the Apollo 11 Moon landing in 1969 as the Galactica receives a television transmission from Earth showing the landing. The later Galactica 1980 series is expressly set in 1980, after a 30-year voyage to Earth.

A member of the Church of Jesus Christ of Latter-day Saints, Larson incorporated many themes from Mormon theology into the shows.

== Cast and characters ==
- Richard Hatch as Captain Apollo
- Dirk Benedict as Lieutenant Starbuck
- Lorne Greene as Commander Adama
- John Colicos as Baltar
- Maren Jensen as Lieutenant Athena
- Noah Hathaway as Boxey
- Herbert Jefferson Jr. as Lieutenant Boomer
- Tony Swartz as Flight Sergeant Jolly
- Laurette Spang as Cassiopeia
- Terry Carter as Colonel Tigh
- Anne Lockhart as Lieutenant Sheba

== Pilot and subsequent changes ==
The pilot, budgeted at $8 million (one of the most expensive at that time), was theatrically released in Sensurround. An edited version was released on July 8, 1978, in several regions including Canada, Japan, and select Western European countries.

On September 17, 1978, the full 148-minute pilot premiered on ABC to high Nielsen ratings. Two–thirds of the way through the broadcast, ABC interrupted with a special report of the signing of the Camp David Accords at the White House by Israeli Prime Minister Menachem Begin and Egyptian President Anwar Sadat, witnessed by U.S. President Jimmy Carter. Following the ceremony, ABC resumed the broadcast at the point where it was interrupted. This interruption did not occur on the West Coast. After the pilot aired, the 125-minute theatrical version received a nationwide theatrical release in May 1979.

The pilot had originally been announced as the first of three television films. After broadcast of the second episode, "Lost Planet of the Gods", however, Larson announced the format change to a weekly series, catching his writing and production staff off guard. This resulted in several 'crash of the week' episodes until other scripts could resume. This also resulted in scripts being finished just minutes before filming started and actors having to read their lines off cue cards, which affected their performances. "Lost Planet" also introduced a costume change from the original, in that the warriors' dress uniform featured a gold-trimmed cape falling to upper thigh. Because of the costume change, a portion of the pilot was reshot; this refilmed version was released in cinemas in 1979. The original version of the warriors' dress uniform, a plain, mid-thigh-length cape, is documented in The Official Battlestar Galactica Scrapbook by James Neyland, 1978.

== Legal troubles ==
In June 1978, prior to the release of the pilot, 20th Century Fox (producers of Star Wars) sued Universal Studios (producers of Battlestar Galactica) for plagiarism, copyright infringement, unfair competition, and Lanham Act claims, alleging Galactica had stolen 34 distinct ideas from Star Wars. Universal promptly countersued, claiming Star Wars had stolen ideas from their 1972 film Silent Running, notably the robot "drones", and the 1930s Buck Rogers serials. Fox's copyright claims were dismissed by the trial court in 1980, but in 1983, a federal appeals court reversed that decision and remanded the case for trial.

Star Wars director George Lucas additionally threatened legal action against Apogee, Inc., the visual effects studio formed by John Dykstra and several other former artists from Lucas' Industrial Light and Magic who decided to remain in Van Nuys rather than relocate to San Rafael, California with the rest of the company. Lucas claimed that Apogee's work on Galactica was being done with equipment that he had left behind, for a project that would be in direct competition against Star Wars. Eventually, Apogee agreed to surrender the equipment to ILM, and several members of Dykstra's team returned to ILM. Afterwards, Universal's newly formed visual effects division, Universal Hartland Visual Effects, took over the show's visual effects for the remainder of its run. Lucas also went after Galactica merchandise, claiming that the Cylon Raider and Colonial Viper toys could be confused with his own Star Wars toys. His major contention was that the Galactica toys featured plastic pellets that could be fired to simulate lasers, and these constituted a choking hazard for children, and he did not want to be blamed for any such accidents, despite none of the Star Wars toys offered by Kenner having anything similar.

Such an accident came to pass on Christmas Day 1978, when a four-year-old child accidentally shot a pellet from a Cylon Raider toy into his mouth, where it lodged in his larynx and caused his brain to be deprived of oxygen. He was declared dead six days later on New Year's Eve 1978. Within two weeks, Mattel issued an immediate recall of all Galactica toys with missiles, and the boy's parents sued Mattel. A second incident involved the Colonial Viper toy which ended in emergency surgery to remove an inhaled pellet from a young boy's lungs. This incident was not fatal, but Mattel subsequently redesigned all of its Galactica toys so that the pellets no longer left the toy when fired.

== Ratings ==
Battlestar Galactica initially was a ratings success. CBS counter programmed by moving its Sunday block of All in the Family and Alice an hour earlier, to compete with Galactica in the 8:00 timeslot. From October 1978 to March 1979, All in the Family averaged more than 40 percent of the 8:00 audience, against Galactica's 28 percent. For the 1978–79 season as a whole, Battlestar Galactica ranked 34th out of 114 shows airing that season, averaging a 19.6 rating and a 30 share.

In mid-April 1979, ABC executives canceled the show. An AP article reported "The decision to bump the expensive Battlestar Galactica was not surprising. The series ... had been broadcast irregularly in recent weeks, attracting slightly over a quarter of the audience in its Sunday night time slot." Larson claimed that it was a failed attempt by ABC to reposition its number one program Mork & Mindy into a more lucrative timeslot. The cancellation led to viewer outrage and protests outside ABC studios, and it even contributed to the suicide of Edward Seidel, a 15-year-old boy in Saint Paul, Minnesota who was obsessed with the program.

== Language ==
While primarily English, the Colonial language was written to include several fictional words that differentiated its culture from those of Earth, most notably time units and expletives. The words were roughly equivalent to their English counterparts, and the minor technical differences in meaning were suggestive to the viewer. Colonial distance and time units were incompletely explained and inconsistent in their usage, but appear to have been primarily in a decimal format.

Time units included micron (less than one second), centon (minute), centar (hour), cycle (day), secton (week), sectar (month), quatron (unknown, perhaps a 25 centar day or maybe 1/4 yahren), yahren (Colonial year), and centuron (Colonial century).

Deprecated time units A millicenton was about 10 minutes long and only used in the first few episodes. The microcenton was replaced with the micron after the 2nd episode "Lost Planet of the Gods".

Distance units were metron (meter), maxim, hectar, and a few other rarely used words.

Expletives included "frack", also spelled "frak" (interjection), "felgercarb" (noun), "snitrag" (noun), and "golmogging", also spelled "gall-mogging" and "galmonging" (adjective). These words avoided US FCC guidelines on the use of profanities and the associated fines.

Other terms included daggit (a canine–like animal indigenous to one of the colonies), ducat (ticket), pyramid (card game), cubit (unit of currency represented by rectangular coins), triad (a full-contact ball and goal game similar to basketball), lupus (a wolf-like animal indigenous to another of the colonies), travelator (travel agent), officiator (triad referee) and socialator (prostitute/escort).

Figures of speech There were a number of these used in the series, such as "daggit dribble", a term used to condemn falsehood, and "daggit-meat", used as an expression of contempt.

== Music ==
The show's original music was composed and conducted by Stu Phillips, with the pilot score performed by the Los Angeles Philharmonic Orchestra. It was recorded at 20th Century Fox, which later sued Universal over the series. MCA Records released a soundtrack album on LP and cassette with Phillips as the music producer; the album was later reissued on compact disc by Edel in 1993, and Geffen Records in 2003. For the series, Phillips used a studio orchestra at Universal, although the theme and end credits music as recorded by the LAPO were retained.

In 2011–2012 Intrada Records released four albums featuring Phillips's music for the series, representing the first commercial release of music other than that of the pilot. (Phillips previously produced a four-CD promotional set.) Except the first, all are two-disc sets.

- 2011: Battlestar Galactica Volume 1: "Saga of a Star World".
- 2011: Battlestar Galactica Volume 2: "Lost Planet of the Gods" parts 1 and 2, and "Gun on Ice Planet Zero" parts 1 and 2.
- 2012: Battlestar Galactica Volume 3: "The Long Patrol", "The Lost Warrior", "The Magnificent Warriors", "The Young Lords", "Murder on the Rising Star", "Take the Celestra", "The Hand of God", and Galactica 1980's "The Return of Starbuck".
- 2012: Battlestar Galactica Volume 4: "The Living Legend" parts 1 and 2, and "War of the Gods" parts 1 and 2, plus music recorded for Mission Galactica: The Cylon Attack and Galactica 1980.

"Fire in Space", "The Man with Nine Lives", "Greetings from Earth", "Baltar's Escape", and "Experiment in Terra" were entirely tracked with preexisting material.

== Real-world criticism ==
Battlestar Galactica was criticized by Melor Sturua in the Soviet newspaper Izvestia. He saw an analogy between the fictional Colonial/Cylon negotiations and the US/Soviet SALT talks and accused the series of being inspired by anti-Soviet hysteria.

== Follow-up projects ==
In 1999, Richard Hatch (who had played Apollo) released a trailer for a proposed sequel, Battlestar Galactica: The Second Coming.

The series was remade with a reimagined three-hour miniseries in 2003 and followed by a weekly series that ran from 2004 to 2009.

Caprica was a prequel series to the 2004 reimagined series that ran for 19 episodes in 2010. It is set 58 years before the main series on the Colonial capital world of Caprica, showing how humanity first created the Cylons, who would later turn against their human masters. One last installment, Battlestar Galactica: Blood & Chrome, a sequel set during the First Cylon War after the events of Caprica, was released on Machinima, Inc. before being released to home video in 2012.

In 2009, Bryan Singer was tapped to direct a feature film remake with production input from original series creator Glen A. Larson. Larson's death in 2014 caused a delay, but in 2016 Lisa Joy was assigned to be the screenwriter and the studio was considering Francis Lawrence to replace Singer as director. As of 2024, no film project has materialized.

A Battlestar Galactica project was announced in 2019 as a future addition to NBCUniversal's Peacock streaming service. Mr. Robot creator Sam Esmail was to serve as the new Galactica's executive producer. In July 2024, Variety reported that the project was no longer in development.

== In popular culture ==
Cast member Dirk Benedict also starred in the 1980s action‑adventure TV series The A-Team. One second-season episode features a scene in which Benedict, in the character of Templeton Peck, is visiting a studio park when a Cylon robot walks across the frame; Peck reacts with an apparent double take. This clip was subsequently used in the credits montage at the beginning of each episode.
