= Spartak (given name) =

Spartak (Russian: Спартак) is a masculine given name of Soviet origin in commemoration of Spartacus. It may also be used in other countries besides the former Soviet Union.

Notable people with the name include:

== Albania ==
- Spartak Ajazi, Albanian footballer
- Spartak Braho, Albanian politician
- Spartak Elmazi, Albanian footballer

== Russia and former Soviet Union ==
- Spartak Akhmetov, Russian politician
- Spartak Belyaev, Soviet and Russian theoretical physicist
- Spartak Borisov, Russian politician and businessman
- Spartak Mishulin, Soviet and Russian actor
- Spartak Murtazayev, Soviet and Uzbek footballer
- Spartak Jejelava (1923–1975), Soviet and Georgian footballer
