= Adlène =

Adlène or Adlene is a given name. Notable people with the name include:

- Adlen Grich (born 1979), Algerian football player
- Adlène Bensaïd (born 1981), Algerian football player
- Adlène Guedioura (born 1985), French-born Algerian international footballer
- Adlene Harrison (1923–2022), American politician, acting mayor of Dallas in 1976, and its first female mayor
- Adlène Hicheur (born 1976), French particle physicist

== See also ==
- Adlen
