= Vilen (given name) =

Vilen, feminine: Vilena are given names originated in the early Soviet Union as an acronym for "Vladimir Ilyich Lenin". Notable people with the name include:

- Vilen Barskyi (1930–2012), Ukrainian Soviet and German painter and graphic artist
- Vilen Galstyan (1941–2021), Armenian actor
- Vilen Ivanov (born 1934), Russian sociologist
- Vilen Kalyuta (1930–1999), Ukrainian cinematographer
- Vilen Komissarov (1924–2005), Russian linguist and translator
- Vilen Künnapu (born 1948), Estonian architect
- Vilen Prokofyev (2001–2020), Kazakh hockey player
- Vilen Strutinsky (1929–1993), Soviet nuclear physicist
- Vilen Tokarev, birth name of Willi Tokarev (1934–2019), Russian-American singer-songwriter
- Vilena Grigoryan (born 1937), Armenian psycho- and neurophysiologist
- Vilena Dylykova (born 1938), Soviet and Russian orientalist, expert in Tibet

== See also ==
- Vladlen
- Villen Novak (1938–2026), Ukrainian film director
