= Pavlenkov =

Pavlenkov, feminine: Pavlenkova is a patronymic surname, a derivative of the nickname Pavlyonok, павлёнок, "peacock's chick" or may be derived from the given name Pavel.. Notable people with the surname include:

- Florenty Pavlenkov, Russian publisher, librarian and philanthropist
- Vladlen Pavlenkov, Soviet dissident
