= ISPR =

ISPR may refer to:

- International Standard Payload Rack, a standard for hardware deployment in the International Space Station
- Institute of Socio-Political Research, a Russian academic research center
- Inter-Services Public Relations, the media wing of the Pakistan Armed Forces
- Inter-Services Public Relations (Bangladesh), the media wing of the Bangladesh Armed Forces
