= Vladimir Martynenko =

Russian sociologist, economist and political scientist

Vladimir Martynenko Владимир Мартыненко
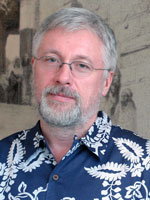
- Born: 24 March 1957 (age 69); Kiev, Ukrainian Soviet Socialist Republic, Soviet Union
- Citizenship: Russian
- Education: Moscow State University
- Scientific career
- Fields: sociology, economy, political science
- Workplaces: Institute of Socio-Political Studies under the Russian Academy of Sciences

Vladimir Vladimirovich Martynenko (Russian: Владимир Владимирович Мартыненко, born March 24, 1957, Kiev, Ukraine) is a Russian sociologist, economist, and political scientist; Doctor of political sciences, Professor, Chief Scientific Officer, Institute of Socio-Political Studies under the Russian Academy of Sciences (ISPI RAN).

The principal trends of Dr. Martynenko's scientific research include an economic sociology and political sociology, investigation of the socio-structuring value of monetary relations and a critical analysis of Marxism and vulgarization of liberal theories.

== Principal research results ==
In his research activity Dr. Martynenko has sought to:

- investigate the contradictions and revise the scientific stock of knowledge in political philosophy and political sociology against the present-day socio-political realities, expose some conceptual gaps in social development; evolve a new social ontology, epistemology and research methodology for analysing a state and civil society and a political identification of social historic forms and prospects for a social revolution;
- develop some new inter-disciplinary trends in scientific research such as sociology of monetary policy and “monetary authorities”, a political sociology of monetary relations and banking activity; evolve a theory of the credit nature for forming legal relations in a society and a concept of money as a category of social law; expose a socio-political value of de-monopolization of currency issue;
- evolve a theory of social insurance as a basic system component for social state functions in order to minimize the risk of social disintegration, widen the socially significant credit relations and secure the well-balanced socio-economic development of a society.

== Principal scientific publications ==
In his books “The Sociology of Monetary Relations” (2004) and “The Unknown Policy of the Bank of Russia” (2004) Dr. Martynenko was the first to present an entirely new approach to an analysis of virtual money characteristics and evolution of money forms, offer a new socially conditioned concept of monetary policy and secure a stable monetary-and-credit system. He formulated and theoretically substantiated some concrete measures aimed at transforming the role and place of monetary authorities in a common system for dividing them as a prerequisite for developing a civil society and overcoming internal contradictions of a democratic state system.

In his book “The Unknown Policy of the Bank of Russia” (2004), Dr. Martynenko made an overall analysis of the aims and methods used by Russia in a monetary policy in the early 1990s and of its socio-economic and political aftermath. He criticized the activity and ideology of the Central Bank of Russia and the Russian Government in a monetary sphere including the formation of an effective banking system and interaction of the Central Bank of Russia with commercial banks. The author suggests an entirely new concept for carrying out a currency issue which supposes a refusal of any provision for a currency issue by the Central Bank of Russia. On the contrary, the volumes of currency issue released by the Central Bank of Russia must themselves serve as a provision (through refunding and deposit insurance) for credit-and-monetary issues of commercial banks. The currency issue of the Central Bank of Russia must be used to meet the current monetary liabilities of commercial banks before creditors and depositors.

The results of developing the methodology for exposing social indicators which characterize the transformation of the policy pursued by the authorities out of the socially claimed indicators into the economically unjustified ones published in the book “Ideology vs. Economics” (2005) is an important stage in scientific and research activity. This process leads to the loss of inner resources and its renewal by the political system.

His book “The Caldera of State Power” (2005) offers an insight into the essence and a dual role of the state and inner peculiarities and contradictions of the given category and is an important scientific work. Therein, Dr. Martynenko also presents some methods for evaluating socially significant decisions adopted by the state power and their conformity to the objective needs and opportunities offered by the balanced socio-economic development. This book is a fundamental investigation of the theoretical and practical interaction of political and civil societies including the political, economic, and social aspects of financial and monetary relations. Martyenko offers some concepts and practical recommendations for optimizing the functions of executive, legislative, legal and also of “monetary” authorities. Pride of place in this book is assigned to the analysis of inner contradictions of the Marxist theory.

The afore-mentioned concepts and substantiation of the given recommendations have been developed further by the author in his subsequent scientific papers and books such as “The Social Epistemology and Politics” (2008), “The Social Matrix of a Political Knowledge” (2008) and “A Civil Society: From Political Speculations and Ideological Mist to a Social Knowledge and Deliberate Option” (2008). These books detail the contents of some new interdisciplinary trends in social research and substantiate the necessity for their profound scientific development. Dr. Martynenko exposes the theory of credit nature for forming socials rights and social insurance system and a social meaning of monetary authorities and currency issue. He also presents a new socially conditioned reading of money as a category for the formation of social subjects’ rights and obligations in a society. The author reveals the socio-political significance of a historic evolution of monetary forms, clarifies its contents, specifies the aims and methods for pursuing a social politics and strategy of social insurance, their role in a systematic guarantee of the balanced socio-economic development and prevention of the risk of social disintegration. This book also explains the reasons for socio-political transformations and concepts of a civil society, outlines the circumstances which helped stimulate a scientific and practical interest in the problems of the present-day civil society.

The book “The Offensive Polytology. The Fundamentals and Peculiarities of a Political Science” (2010) is noted for its special scientific significance in the solution of conceptual problems in political science and sociology. This book assesses the theoretical legacy in political philosophy, political sociology, political economy and sociology and outlines the key trends and methodology for interdisciplinary political research.

== Sources ==
- Dr. Martynenko’s personal page (incl. biography) in the ISPI RAN Web site
- Dr. Martynenko’s profile in the Russian Academy of Sciences Web site (in Russian)
