= Names of Soviet origin =

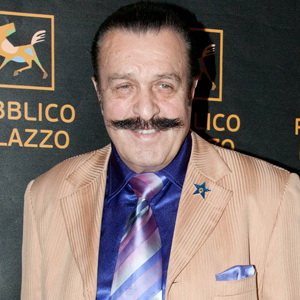
Vilen "Willi" Tokarev was "octobered" with the name Vilen after V.I. Lenin

Given names of Soviet origin appeared in the early history of the Soviet Union, coinciding with the period of intensive word formation, both being part of the so-called "revolutionary transformation of the society" with the corresponding fashion of neologisms and acronyms, which Richard Stites characterized as a utopian vision of creating a new reality by means of verbal imagery. They constituted a notable part of the new Soviet phraseology.

Such names may be primarily found in Russian persons, and sometimes in Belarusians and Ukrainians, as well as in other minorities of the former USSR (e.g. Tatar).

== History ==
The proliferation of the new names was enhanced by the propagation of a short-lived "new Soviet rite" of Octobering, in replacement of the religious tradition of child baptism in the state with the official dogma of Marxist–Leninist atheism.

In defiance of the old tradition of taking names from menology, according to the feast days, many names were taken from nature having patriotic, revolutionary, or progressive connotation: Beryoza (Берёза, "birch tree", a proverbial Russian tree), Gvozdika (Гвоздика, "carnation", a revolutionary flower), Granit (Гранит, "granite", a symbol of power), Radiy (Радий, "radium", a symbol of scientific progress). A peculiarity of the new naming was neologisms based on the revolutionary phraseology of the day, such as Oktyabrin/Oktyabrina, to commemorate the October Revolution, or Vladlen for Vladimir Lenin.

Richard Stites classifies the Soviet "revolutionary" names into the following categories:

- Revolutionary heroes (their first names, their last names used as first names and various acronyms thereof)
- Revolutionary concepts (exact terms and various acronyms)
- Industrial, scientific, and technical imagery
- Culture, myth, nature, place names

Most of these names were short-lived linguistic curiosities, but some of them fit well into the framework of the language, proliferated and survived for a long time.

== Common new names ==
The following names were quite common and may be found in various antroponymic dictionaries.

Name (Cyrillic)	Transliteration	Origin	Comments
Вил, Вилен, Владлен, Владлена	Vil, Vilen, Vladlen (m) / Vladlena (f), Vladilen	Владимир Ильич Ленин (Vladimir Ilyich Lenin)	"Vilen" or "Vilén" is also a traditional Finnish and Swedish surname.
Мэл	Mel	Маркс, Энгельс и Ленин (Marx, Engels and Lenin)	
Мэлс	Mels	Маркс, Энгельс, Ленин и Сталин (Marx, Engels, Lenin and Stalin)	
Баррикад, Баррикада	Barrikad (m) / Barrikada (f)	Barricade	Refers to the revolutionary activity
Ревмир, Ревмира	Revmir (m) / Revmira (f)	Революция мира (Revolyutsiya mira)	Means "The revolution of the World"
Гертруда	Gertruda	Gertrude reinterpreted as Герой труда (Geroy truda)	Means "The Hero of Labour"
Марлен	Marlen (m)	Marlene reinterpreted as Маркс и Ленин (Marx and Lenin)	
Стэн	Sten, Stan	Stan reinterpreted as Сталин и Энгельс (Stalin and Engels)	
Те́льман	Telman	Telman is a tribute to German Communist Ernst Thälmann	
Ким	Kim	Kim reinterpreted as Коммунистический интернационал молодёжи (Kommunistichesky Internatsional Molodyozhi)	Young Communist International

== People with Soviet names ==
- Avangard:
  - Avangard Leontiev (born 1947), Soviet and Russian theater and film actor, teacher, professor
  - Avangard Fyodorov, Soviet and Russian clarinetist and music educator
- Barrikad Zamyshlyaev: Баррикад, from "barricade"
- Demokrat Leonov: after Democracy
- Dzhonrid Svanidze (after John Reed)
- Elmira (name): Эльмира, backronym for "электрификация мира", elektrifikatsiya mira (electrification of the world)
- Geliy: Гелий = "helium", multiple persons
- Aleksandr Gelyevich Dugin: Patronym = Ге́льевич. Father's name: Geliy = "helium"
- Izil Zabludovsky: Изиль = исполнитель заветов Ильича, ispolnitel zavetov Il'icha (Performer of the Testaments of Il'ich (Lenin))
- Igor Talankin: birth name: Индустрий (Industriy)
- Iskra: И́скра, in reference to Iskra, the revolutionary newspaper, the name of which means "spark"
- Frunzik Mkrtchyan, Armenian actor, in honor of Mikhail Frunze
- Nonna Mordyukova: born Ноябри́на (Noyabrina), from Noyabr = "November"; October Revolution (which happened in November by the Gregorian calendar)
- Aleksei Oktyabrinovich Balabanov: Patronym = Oктябpинoвич. Father's name: Октябри́н from 'October'
- Pobisk Kuznetsov (поколение борцов и строителей коммунизма, 'generation of fighters and builders of Communism')
- Radiy Pogodin: Радий (Radiy) = "radium"
- Radner Muratov: Раднэ́р = радуйся новой эре, raduysya novoy ere ("Hail the new era")
- Revolt Pimenov: Рево́льт
- Rem Viakhirev: Рем = революция мировая, revolyutsiya mirovaya (World revolution)
- Rem Petrov: Рэм = Революция, Энгельс, Маркс (Revolution, Engels, Marx)
- Rimma Kazakova, birth name Remo, Рэмо = Революция, электрификация, мировой Октябрь, revolyutsiya, elektrifikatsiya, mirovoy Oktyabr (Revolution, Electrification, October of the World)
- Spartak (given name): Спартак = "Spartacus", multiple persons
- Telman (given name): multiple persons
- Torez Kulumbegov: after Maurice Thorez
- Zhores: Жоре́с, after Jean Jaurès

=== Marx/Engels/Lenin ===
- Arlen = ARmiya LENina (Lenin's army)
  - Arlen Blyum (1933–2011), Soviet and Russian bibliographer, historian of Russian and Soviet censorship
  - Arlen Ilyin (1932–2013), Soviet and Russian mathematician
  - Arlen Kashkurevich (1929–2013), Soviet and Belarusian artist
  - Arlen Meliksetov (1930–2006, Soviet and Russian sinologist
- Elem Klimov: Эле́м = Engels, LEnin, Marx
- Engelsina Markizova: Энгельси́на.
- Marlen#Soviet name: Марле́н = Marx + Lenin
- Melor Sturua: Мэлор = "Marx, Engels, Lenin, October Revolution"
- Mels (name), multiple persons
- Ninel Tkachenko: Нинель = "Lenin" read backwards
- Ninel Shakhova
- Vil Mirzayanov: Вил, from VIL = Vladimir Ilyich Lenin
- Vil Lipatov: Виль
- Vilen, multiple persons
- Villen Novak: Віллен (Ukrainian)
- Vladilen, multiple persons
- Vladlen, multiple persons
- Vladlena, multiple persons
- Willi Tokarev: Вилли, born Vilen
