= Yaroslavna =

East Slavic feminine patronymic

Yaroslavna (Russian: and Ukrainian: Ярославна) is either an archaic or a colloquial contracted feminine East Slavic patronymic derived from the given name Yaroslav. The modern non-contracted patronymic is Yaroslavovna. The corresponding masculine patronymic is Yaroslavich. Notable persons with this patronymic include:

- Anastasia Yaroslavna or Anastasia of Kiev (1023-1074/1094), Queen of Hungary
- Anna Yaroslavna or Anne of Kiev (1030-1075), Queen of France
- Euphrosyne Yaroslavna (fl. 12th century), wife of Igor Svyatoslavich, Prince of Novgorod-Seversk, commonly known simply as 'Yaroslavna', following the famous "Yaroslavna's Lament" from The Tale of Igor's Campaign
- Maria Yaroslavna, or Maria of Borovsk, grand princess of Moscow, being wife of Vasily II of Moscow
- Vysheslava Yaroslavna, Russian name of the East Slavic princess married into Poland and mostly known by the Polish name Wyszesława halicka, or Vysheslava of Halych
- Yelizaveta Yaroslavna or Elisiv of Kiev, queen consort of Harald III of Norway
