= Telman (given name) =

Telman is a Russian-language name of Soviet origin, a tribute to Ernst Thälmann, encountered in former Soviet Union. Notable people with the name include:

- Telman Adigozalov
- Telman Aliev
- Telman Gdlyan
- Telman Kazimov
- Telman Malikov
- Telman Ismailov
- Telman Pashayev
- Telman Zeynalov
