= Gennady Osipov =

Russian scientist and academic (born 1929)

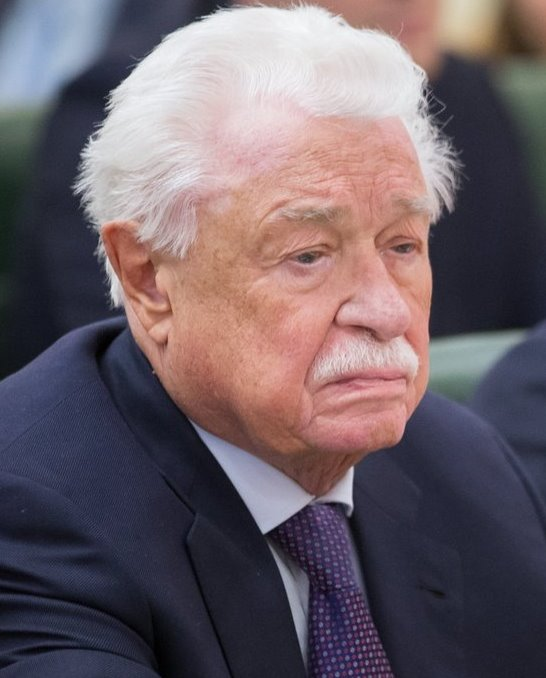
Gennady Osipov, 2018

Gennady Vasilievich Osipov (Russian: Геннадий Васильевич Осипов) (born June 27, 1929 in Ruzayevka, Mordovia) is a Russian scientist, sociologist and philosopher, Ph.D., Professor, full member (academician) of the Russian Academy of Sciences /RAS/ since 1991; scientific leader of the Institute of Socio-Political Research of the Russian Academy of Sciences (ISPR RAS); President of the Russian Academy of Social Sciences (RASS); member of RAS Social Sciences Department Bureau; President of the Eurasian International Association; member of the Scientific Council of the Russian Security Council; Honorary President of the Russian Sociological Association. Osipov graduated from Moscow State Institute of International Relations (MGIMO-University) in 1952.

Thanks to his organizational and scientific activities, sociology has become a vital component of humanitarian and social sciences. Osipov was the first to initiate sociological research in the USSR and stood behind the first Soviet sociological journal Sotsialnye issledovaniya (Social research) published since 1967. He made a major contribution to the development of theoretical and methodological basis of scientific analysis of the socio-political situation in Russia with due regard for foreign sociological thought. In the 1960-70s he initiated the translation of the papers by American and British sociologists into Russian. Osipov is the author of the first Russian textbook on sociology – Rabochaya kniga sotsiologa (Sociologist's handbook) which was translated into various languages. He penned over 250 scientific works on crucial issues of sociology and philosophy. He initiated the establishment of two Institutes: The Institute of Sociology under the Russian Academy of Sciences (RAS) and the Institute of Socio-Political Research (ISPR RAS).

== Awards and prizes ==
- Order of Honor
- Order of Friendship
