= Rudolph Yanovskiy =

Rudolph Grigorjevich Yanovskiy (Russian: Рудольф Григорьевич Яновский) (born June 16, 1929, in Suzdal, Vladimir Oblast; died January 13, 2010) was a Russian philosopher, professor, Ph.D., corresponding member of the Russian Academy of Sciences (from 1991), President of the All-Russian Scientific Association of Sociologists and Demographers, full member of the Russian Academy of Social Sciences and chairman of the editorial board of the Bezopasnost Evrazii (Eurasia's Security) journal. He was a top authority on national security, the sociology of social consciousness, the formation, intellectual and moral development of an individual with a special emphasis on women's socio-political status.

From 1991, he was employed by the Institute of Socio-Political Research under the Russian Academy of Sciences as a top scientist. He was head of the Sociology Department for National Security and Federalism and head of the National Security Centre.
