= Yaroslavich =

East Slavic masculine patronymic

Yaroslavich or Yaroslavych (Russian and Ukrainian: Ярославич) is either an archaic or colloquial contracted masculine East Slavic patronymic derived from the given name Yaroslav with the patronymic suffix -ich, meaning "son of Yaroslav". The modern, non-contracted patronymic is Yaroslavovich. The corresponding feminine patronymic is Yaroslavna. Notable persons with this patronymic include:

- Alexander Nevsky before acquiring the epithet "Nevsky" was referred to as "Aleksandr Yaroslavich"
- Andrey II Yaroslavich or Andrey II of Vladimir
- Igor Yaroslavich, son of Yaroslav the Wise
- Iziaslav Yaroslavich or Iziaslav I of Kiev
- Mikhail Yaroslavich or Mikhail of Tver
- Sviatoslav II Yaroslavich or Sviatoslav II of Kiev
- Vladimir Yaroslavich:
  - Vladimir of Novgorod
  - Vladimir II Yaroslavich (fl. 1180–1198), prince of Halych (1187–1189, 1189–1198/99)
- Vsevolod I Yaroslavich or Vsevolod I of Kiev
- Yaroslav III Yaroslavich or Yaroslav of Tver
