= Tony Swartz =

American actor

Tony Swartz (born September 24, 1943, in Iowa as Russell Anthony Swartz; died September 27, 2016, in Missouri) was an American actor whose roles include Flight Sergeant Jolly on the original Battlestar Galactica television series.

Swartz appeared in episodes of The Golden Girls, Kojak and The Invisible Man television series, as well as in a number of television movies.

Swartz worked on a number of documentary and promotional films.

In addition to acting, his roles in television and film production included working as a location scout, and as a driver.

Married to Helen Blume, his daughter is Kathryn Swartz.

== Filmography ==
Year	Title	Role	Notes
1976	Dynasty	Harry Blackwood	TV movie
1978	Battlestar Galactica	Flight Sergeant Jolly	
1978-1979	Battlestar Galactica	Flight Sergeant Jolly	TV series, 21 episodes
1980	Schizoid	Bartender	Uncredited
1986	The Golden Girls	John	TV series
