= Zhores =

Zhores is a Russian given name of Soviet origin; Russian: Жорес, after Jean Jaurès (Russian: Жан Жорес, romanized: Zhan Zhores). Notable people with the name include:

- Zhores Alferov (1930–2019), Russian physicist
- Zhores Khachatryan (1935–2017), Armenian archaeologist
- Zhores Medvedev (1925–2018), Russian dissident, biologist, and historian
