= Geliy =

Geliy: Russian: Гелий = "helium" a Russian masculine given name of Soviet origin. Notable people with the name include:

- Geliy Arkadyev (1927–2002) Soviet and Russian animator and illustrator
- Geliy Aronov (1932–2016) Soviet and Ukrainian doctor, medical scientist, and writer
- Geliy Aronov, birth name of Grigori Aronov (1923–1984), Soviet film director, actor, and screenwriter
- Geliy Korzhev (1925–2012), Soviet and Russian painter
- Geliy Ryabov (1922–2015) Soviet and Russian writer, film director and screenwriter
- Geliy Zherebtsov (1938) Soviet and Russian radiophysicist
