= Double-take (comedy) =

Expression of surprise in body language

A double-take is a nonverbal communication in which a second look is taken at something with a marked physical reaction such as shock, astonishment, or amazement.

In theatrical terms, a "take" is a physical reaction to seeing something. Comic characters often perform a double take because of the absurd world in which they are performing, and their audiences are often in a similar position when they have had an instant to reflect on a comic performance. With correct timing, a double-take seldom fails to get a laugh. The double-take has probably been in the comedians repertoire for centuries, and the term has been in general use since at least the 1940s.
