= Spartak Elmazi =

Albanian footballer (1987–2021)

Personal information
- Date of birth: 3 December 1987
- Place of birth: Korçë, Albania
- Date of death: 19 December 2021 (aged 34)
- Position: Midfielder

Senior career*
Years	Team	Apps	(Gls)
2007–2012	Pogradeci	66	(4)
2012–2013	Tomori	23	(1)
2013–2014	Kastrioti	7	(0)
2014–2015	Mamurrasi	16	(0)
2015–2016	Dinamo Tirana	19	(0)
2016–2017	Kamza	21	(0)
2017–2018	Dinamo Tirana	20	(0)
- * Club domestic league appearances and goals

Spartak Elmazi (3 December 1987 – 19 December 2021) was an Albanian footballer who played as a midfielder. He died on 19 December 2021, at the age of 34.
