= Mels (name) =

Mels is a given name. It was created in the Soviet Union as an acronym of the major Communist figures:
Мэлс (Маркс, Энгельс, Ленин и Сталин),
Mels (Marx, Engels, Lenin and Stalin).

Notable people with the given name include:

- Mels An (born 1949) Soviet and Uzbekistani sambo wrestler, Honored Coach of Uzbekistan (1982)
- Mels Bekboyev (born 1952), Kyrgyzstani military commander
- Mels Dabayev Soviet and Russian arher
- Mels Eleusizov (born 1950), Kazakh public figure and ecologist. He was a candidate for President of Kazakhstan in the 2005 and 2011 elections
- Mels Kosymbayev (born 1970), Kazakhstani poet
- Mels Safin, Soviet and Kazakhstani architect
- Sambuyev (1940–1981), was a Buryat poet in the Soviet Union.
- Mels Turjanov (1940–2004) Russian physician and public figure

== Fictional characters ==
- Mels Biryukov, main character in the 2008 Russian film Stilyagi
