= Vladilen =

Vladilen (abbreviation of Vladimir Lenin) is a Russian masculine given name of Soviet origin, created after Vladimir Lenin's death as a way to commemorate him. Notable people with the name include:

- Vladilen Mashkovtsev (1929–1997), Russian poet, writer and journalist
- Vladilen Letokhov, Soviet and Russian physicist
- Vladilen F. Minin (born 1932), Soviet physicist
- Vladilen Nikitin (1936–2021), Soviet Russian engineer and politician
- Vladilen Volkov (born 1939), Russian politician
- Vladilen Zakharov (born 1994), Russian ice hockey player

== See also ==
- Vladlen
