= Octobering =

Child naming ceremony in the early Soviet Union

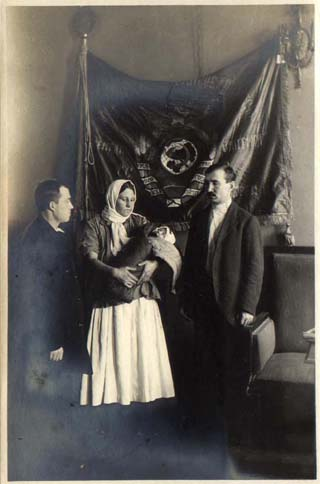
Octobering in 1927

Octobering was a naming ceremony which occurred during the early era of the Soviet Union, which involved giving a name to a newborn, introduced by the state on the official basis of Marxist–Leninist atheism as an attempt to replace the religious tradition of christening. The term serves as a translation of two synonymous Soviet neologisms: Oktyabryenie, coined in an analogy to Kreshcheniye, literally, the sacrament of "baptism", and Oktyabriny instead of Krestiny, the latter being a family celebration on the occasion of baptism.

The term Oktyabriny is distinct from Oktyabrina, which is a Soviet given name. All three words are derived from the word Oktyabr (October), commemorating the October Revolution.

Since the religious symbol of the Christian cross was replaced with the revolutionary symbol of Red Star (Russian: "krasnaya zvezda"), the ceremony was also called zvezdiny, in an analogy with krestiny, the term "to Christen" (Russian: okrestit) was replaced with the term ozvezdit.

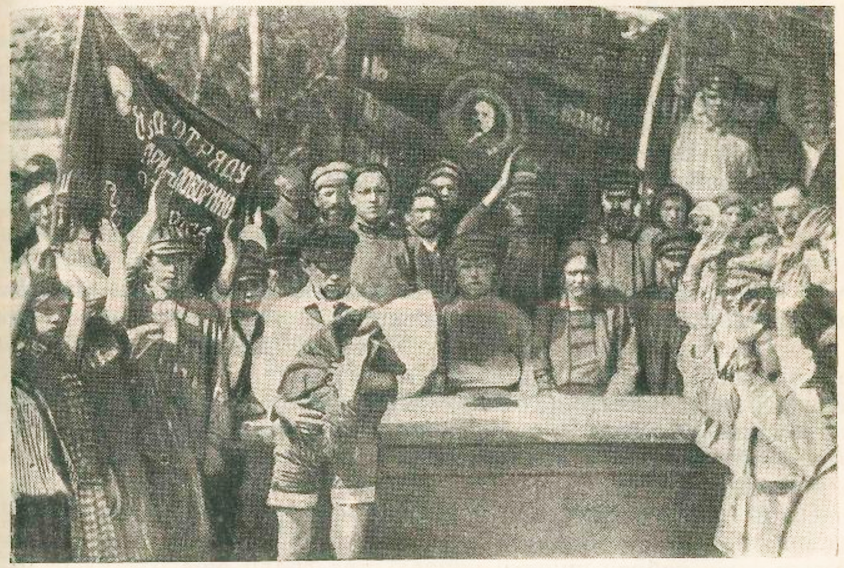
Octobering in village, 1932.

Despite being short-lived, this new Soviet rite contributed to the proliferation of the new names based on revolutionary phraseology, such as Oktyabrina, Vladlen (for Vladimir Lenin), etc.

== Cultural references ==
In the 1988 film Heart of a Dog, there is an episode where a mother who brought a newborn baby girl to ozvezdit was given a choice of "revolutionary names" including Barrikada, Bebelina, etc.
