= Institute of Socio-Political Research =

The Institute of Socio-Political Research under the Russian Academy of Sciences (ISPR RAS) is a Russian academic research center. It is engaged in a fundamental and applied research of social and socio-political processes. It was established in 1991 in Moscow.

The basic areas and directions of the scientific researches involve: global problems of contemporary civilization and Russia; analysis and forecasting of Russia’s socio-political development; social dynamics, structure and stratification of Russian society; methods and instruments for sociological research; sociology of management; political and economic sociology; demographic and migratory processes; sociology of federate and interethnic relations; social problems of national security; sociology of human rights; sociology of youth; social ecology, etc. The Institute makes a socio-political analysis of the decisions made by the governmental, legislative and executive bodies.

It publishes some scientific journals including Eurasia, Nauka. Kultura. Obshchestvo /Science. Culture. Society/ (previously known as Nauka. Kultura. Predprinimatelstvo. /Science. Politics. Entrepreneurship/), methodical materials and manuals on sociology.

The International UNESCO Chair of Social and Humanitarian Sciences has been set up at the Institute.

The ISPR maintains links and with scientific institutions of the Russian Academy of Sciences, academic and scientific circles of the former USSR member-states, as well as with Great Britain, Germany, Israel, China, Netherlands, USA, France and other countries.

== See also ==
- Vilen Ivanov
- Dzhangir Kerimov
- Gennady Osipov
- Rudolph Yanovskiy
- Vladimir Martynenko
- Alexandr Kapto
