= Melor Sturua =

Russian journalist (1928–2021)

Melor Sturua (Russian: Мэлор Стуруа; April 10, 1928 – June 1, 2021) was a Soviet journalist who wrote for Izvestia since 1950. He was the longest serving journalist at the newspaper.

== Biography ==
Born in Tbilisi, Georgian SSR, Soviet Union, his father was one of the founders of the Social Democratic Party in Russia and also was the former Chairman of the Presidium of the Supreme Soviet of the Georgian SSR. Because his father wrote an autobiography in which he tried to clear his friends who had become victims of the Great Purge and was removed from office because of that, Sturua could not enter a diplomatic career and so he eventually became a journalist, with the aid of Deputy Prime Minister Anastas Mikoyan.

Sturua became the Deputy Foreign Editor for Izvestia and was Bureau Chief for the newspaper in New York between 1968 and 1972 and was acting Foreign editor between 1972 and 1976. From 1976 till 1982, he was Washington Bureau Chief and from 1982 till 1984 he was Foreign Editor. Sturua was a political columnist since 1982.

Melor's name is an acronym for "Marx-Engels-Lenin-October Revolution" (Маркс-Энгельс-Ленин-Октябрьская Революция).
