= Beknazarov =

Beknazarov is a patronymic surname derived from the given name Beknazar (Bek-nazar) known in Central Asia with the Russian patronymic suffix "-ov". Notable people with the surname include:

- Begench Beknazarov, Turkmen military officer
- Bektas Beknazarov (born 1956), Kazakh politician
- Berik Beknazarov (born 1957), Kazakhstani handball coach
- Khurshed Beknazarov (born 1994), Tajikistani football player
- Nurlan Beknazarov (born 1964), Kazakh politician
- Hamo Bek-Nazarov (1891–1965), Armenian film director, actor, and screenwriter
