= Spartak Murtazayev =

Uzbekistani footballer

Personal information
- Date of birth: 7 October 1977 (age 49)
- Place of birth: Tashkent, Uzbek SSR, Soviet Union
- Height: 1.85 m (6 ft 1 in)
- Position: Defender

Senior career*
Years	Team	Apps	(Gls)
1997–1998	Sogdiana Jizak	34	(2)
1998	FC Pakhtakor Tashkent	6	(0)
2000	Sogdiana Jizak	15	(0)
2000–2002	Qyzylqum Zarashfan	66	(11)
2003–2004	FC Ordabasy	40	(2)
2004	Yassy Sayram	11	(0)
2005	FC Ordabasy	14	(0)
2006	Sogdiana Jizak	14	(2)
2006–2007	FC Atyrau	16	(2)
2008–	FK Samarqand-Dinamo		

International career^{‡}
1998	Uzbekistan	?	(?)
- * Club domestic league appearances and goals as of 4 April 2008 ‡ National team caps and goals as of 24 July 2007

Spartak Murtazayev (born 7 October 1977) is an Uzbekistani footballer currently playing for Kazakhstan Super League club FC Atyrau as a defender.

He was a member of the national team.
