= Pisarenko =

Pysarenko or Pisarenko is a Ukrainian surname. It is a patronymic surname derived from the father's nickname or surname 'Pisar', meaning "scribe". Notable people with this surname include:

- Anatoly Pisarenko (born 1958), Ukrainian weightlifter
- Galina Pisarenko
- Valeriy Pysarenko
- Vitaly Pisarenko (born 1987), Ukrainian pianist
- Vladilen Fedorovich Pisarenko, the author of Pisarenko harmonic decomposition, a method of frequency estimation
