= Vilen Ivanov =

Russian sociologist

Vilen Nikolaevich Ivanov (born July 6, 1934 in Poltava, Soviet Union) is a Russian sociologist, Ph.D., Professor, corresponding member of the Russian Academy of Sciences (RAS); since October, 2005 he has been a RAS adviser; member of the Bureau for Social Sciences under the RAS; Vice-President of the Russian Academy of Social Sciences; Editor-in-Chief of the Nauka. Kultura. Obshchestvo Journal; member of the Presidium of Moscow Sociological Association; honorary member of the Russian Association of Sociologists; full member of the Belarusian Academy of Social Sciences; Vice-President of the International Academy of Russia-Belarus Union; member of the Union of Russian Writers; full member of the Academy of Literature (since 2006). V. Ivanov is the author of more than 400 scientific publications (monographs, manuals, brochures) and of 11 collections of poems.

- He graduated from the Lenin Political-Military Academy with honours.
- From 1983 to September 1988 V. Ivanov was Director of the Institute of Sociological Research under the Academy of Sciences of the USSR.
- From 1991 to 2005 he was the first Deputy Director of the Institute of Socio-Political Research of the Russian Academy of Sciences (ISPR RAS)
- At present time he is Deputy Head of the Sociology Department for National Security and Federalism under the ISPR RAS.

== Awards and Prizes ==
- Order of Friendship (1986);
- Medal for Serving the Motherland, 2nd degree
- The Order “Renascence of Russia, 21st century”;
- Gold Medal for the Assembly of Russian Peoples.

== See also ==
- Institute of Socio-Political Research

== Sources ==
- V.N. Ivanov’s biography (in Russian)
