= Adlène Hicheur =

French physicist (born 1976)

- Born: 4 December 1976 (age 49); Setif, Algeria
- Citizenship: Algerian, French
- Education: Université de Lyon, Université de Savoie
- Known for: His accusation of terrorism while he was working as physicist at the Large Hadron Collider
- Scientific career
- Fields: Particle Physics
- Workplaces: European Organization for Nuclear Research (CERN); Rutherford Appleton Laboratory (RAL); Swiss Federal Institute of Technology

Adlène Hicheur (born 4 December 1976) is a particle physicist with dual Algerian and French nationality. After his master of theoretical physics in Lyon, he joined LAPP (Laboratoire d'Annecy le Vieux de Physique des Particules) to work on the BaBar experiment, located at the Stanford Linear Accelerator Center. His thesis, defended in 2003, was about the production of high energy Eta prime mesons in the decays of B mesons. After that he was a Postdoctorate in England at the Rutherford Appleton Laboratory, where he worked on the ATLAS experiment at LHC. He then joined the high energy physics department of École Polytechnique Fédérale de Lausanne (EPFL) and works currently on the LHCb experiment.

Adlène Hicheur was arrested in France on 8 October 2009, after police allegedly intercepted emails between himself and Al-Qaida in Islamic Maghreb, an Algerian-based terrorist organisation. Two weeks after his arrest, the Algerian media compared Hicheur to Lotfi Raissi, who was first suspected of terrorism before being released without charges. An International Support Committee was organized by Adlene's friends and colleagues to support Adlene and to request a fair investigation.

General director of the National Police Frédéric Péchenard stated in November 2009 that Hicheur planned to attack a base of the National Defence in Annecy, which harbours the 27ème bataillon de chasseurs alpins, involved in Afghanistan.

Hicheur's trial started on 29 March 2012 in Paris. In May 2012 Hicheur was sentenced to "five years in prison for plotting terrorist attacks." On 15 May Hicheur left prison and decided not to appeal against his sentence. He was a visiting professor at Instituto de Física of Universidade Federal do Rio de Janeiro, Rio de Janeiro, Brazil.

In July 2016, the government of Brazil had Hicheur deported back to France, where he was placed under house arrest. Hicheur has decided to renounce his French citizenship and move to Algeria.
