= Michel Adlen =

- Born: Michel Adler; May 15, 1898; Lutsk or Saky, Russian Empire
- Died: January 21, 1980 (aged 81); 10th arrondissement of Paris, France
- Known for: Painting, printmaking
- Movement: École de Paris
- Spouse: Jeanne (1902–1997)

Michel Adlen (born 15 May 1898 – 21 January 1980) was a painter and printmaker of Ukrainian-Jewish origin who built his career in France. He is associated with the École de Paris.

== Early life and training ==
Adlen was born in the Russian Empire, in either Lutsk or Saky — sources differ on the location. Between 1915 and 1922, he studied painting in Vienna, where he had his first public exhibitions and contributed to the satirical illustrated magazine Die Muskete.

== Career ==
=== Berlin and arrival in Paris ===
In 1923, Adlen moved to Berlin, where he participated in multiple graphic arts exhibitions. That same year, he settled in Paris, which would remain the centre of his artistic life. He underwent a brief Cubist and Fauvist period around 1925 before turning toward a different direction.

In Paris, Adlen founded the Jewish Painters and Sculptors Association and joined several artists' organisations, including the Union of Russian Artists in Paris, La Satire, and Les Imagiers. He obtained French nationality in 1929.

=== Style and influences ===
After his Cubist period, Adlen adopted the tradition of French landscape painting in the lineage of Corot and Pissarro, with some works recalling Cézanne. As a member of the École de Paris, he produced landscapes, portraits of women, urban scenes, and still lifes — often featuring wild flowers and fruit — characterised by a melancholic mood arising from the predominance of grey tones.

His wife Jeanne, originally from Saint-Yrieix-la-Perche in the Haute-Vienne, introduced him to the landscapes of the Limousin region. He subsequently divided his time between his Paris studio and extended stays in the Limousin and the region of Nice.

=== Illustration and printmaking ===
From 1929 to 1939, Adlen worked as an illustrator for several major Parisian magazines and received numerous commissions. Alongside his paintings, he produced a substantial body of graphic work, including lithographs, coloured prints, etchings, and drawings. In 1936, he participated in the International Exhibition of Wood Engraving in Warsaw.

== Collections ==
Adlen's works entered public collections from as early as 1928, when the museums of Moscow and Kyiv acquired his prints. His work is also held by the Musée National des Arts et Traditions Populaires in Paris.

== Death ==
Michel Adlen died on 21 January 1980 in the 10th arrondissement of Paris.
