= Vladlena =

Vladlena, an abbreviation of Vladimir Lenin, is a feminine given name of Soviet origin. Notable people with the name include:

- Vladlena Bobrovnikova, Russian handball player
- Vladlena Funk, Russian-American reporter held captive by the Belarusian KGB
- Vladlena Priestman, British archer

== See also ==
- Vladlen
