= Willi Tokarev =

Russian-American singer (1934–2019)

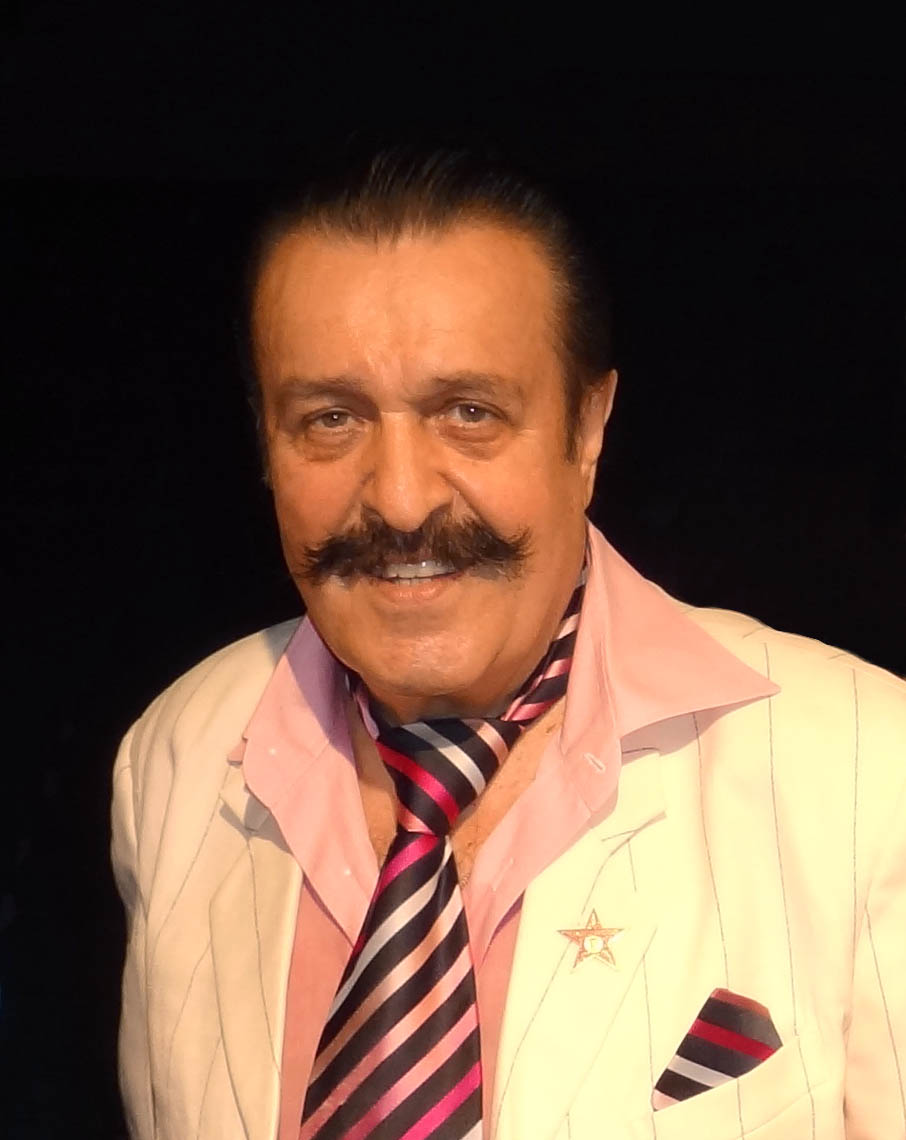
- Tokarev in 2012

Background information
- Born: Vilen Ivanovich Tokarev; 11 November 1934; Chernyshev, Russian SFSR, Soviet Union
- Died: 4 August 2019 (aged 84) Moscow, Russia
- Genres: Russian chanson
- Occupation: Singer-songwriter
- Website: willitokarev.ru

Willi Ivanovich Tokarev (Russian: Вилли Иванович Токарев; 11 November 1934 – 4 August 2019) was a Russian-American singer-songwriter. In the 1980s, he became famous throughout the Soviet Union for his songs about life as a Russian émigré in Brighton Beach, New York.

== Early life and education ==
Vilen Ivanovich Tokarev was born in the small Cossack village of Chernyshev in Adyghe Autonomous Oblast, North Caucasus Krai, Soviet Union, on 11 November 1934. His father was a Kuban Cossack by birth. His parents named him in honor of Vladimir Lenin (see names of Soviet origin), as the Soviet name "Vilen" is an acronym for "Vladimir Ilyich Lenin".

In 1941 his family moved to the town of Kaspiysk in Dagestan. In 1948, he made his first sea voyage, as a fireman. After the obligatory military service, in which he served in the signal corps, Tokarev moved to Leningrad. There he pursued a formal education in music by joining the string department of the music school at the Leningrad Conservatory (double bass class). During his study, Tokarev worked in the Anatoly Kroll Orchestra, in the Jean Tatlian Sympho-Jazz Ensemble, in the Boris Rychkov Ensemble, and later in the ensemble Druzhba, conducted by Aleksandr Bronevitsky with Edita Piekha as vocalist. As a music student, he also started writing songs, notably "Rain" ("Дождь"), which was recorded by Edita Piekha, and "Winter Song" ("Зимняя песенка"), recorded by her as well.

== Singing career ==
Tokarev said that he "probably became a singer by chance. Nikolay Nikitsky, a film actor and singer very popular at the time, invited me to accompany him at his concerts. Once during a concert he offered me to sing one of my songs myself. When I finished, the audience gave me an ovation. Nikitsky, seeing such a success, told me, 'Willi, you have to sing!'" And Tokarev, in addition to playing double bass and writing songs, started singing.

From 1970 to 1974 he lived and performed as a singer in the town of Murmansk. According to Tokarev, he moved from Leningrad because at the time in Moscow and Leningrad, jazz fell out of favor with the authorities, while in Murmansk he could be himself. In Murmansk Tokarev worked as a singer at the restaurant White Nights where he led the music band Nord-West.

In 1973, Tokarev's song "Murmanchanochka" ("Murmansk Girl") became a huge local hit.

In 1974, Tokarev emigrated from the USSR to the United States, to New York City. At first he accepted any job to survive. On one occasion, he was fired from a job as a courier on Wall Street because of his poor English; afterward he studied the language on his own with an audio cassette course. After getting a driver's license, Tokarev began working as a taxi driver and was finally earning decent money. It took him four years in a taxi to collect $15,000 to record and release an album. The album, released in 1979 on vinyl record, was a serious songwriting effort, but was only mildly successful. His second album, V Shumnom Balagane (1981), full of humorous songs stylized as urban folklore of the Russian criminal underground, made him famous in the Russian-speaking community of New York. The restaurant where Tokarev worked as a singer started to pay him well and soon he was able to buy a flat on the seashore and a car.

In the 1980s his songs were widely known among Russian emigrants in the United States. Tokarev worked as a singer in three big Russian-speaking restaurants on Brighton Beach: Sadko, Primorsky, and Odessa.

Back in the Soviet Union, his songs about the United States written from the perspective of a Russian émigré also became very popular. They were not broadcast and were de facto forbidden, but they were widely known.

In the late 1980s, Tokarev began traveling back to the USSR. As he recalls, when in 1988 he went on a "test trip" to the Soviet Union with Impresario Leonard Lev, he was greeted in the Sheremetyevo Airport by a crowd of people asking him for autographs and to take a photo with them, and was very surprised that the people knew him somehow. His first tour across the Soviet Union, organized by Gosconcert (the Soviet Union State Concert Organization), took place in 1989 and consisted of 70 concerts.

Tokarev permanently returned to Russia in 1996. From 2005, he was a resident of Moscow. He lived in the famous Kotelnicheskaya Embankment Building and was named an Honorary Resident of Moscow's Tagansky Raion.

Tokarev was still active at the age of 80, touring and recording new songs. As of March 2013, his discography included 48 studio and five compilation albums. He also had cameo appearances in several movies, including Day Watch.

In early 2017, Tokarev performed a new song, "Trumplissimo America!", at a function in Moscow in support of Donald Trump's inauguration as the 45th President of the United States.

== Personal life ==
At the age of 62, Tokarev married for the fourth time. His wife Julia, who became a Gerasimov Institute of Cinematography graduate, was over forty years his junior. They had two children: daughter Evillina (born around 1999) and son Milen (born around 2003). Tokarev also had two sons from previous marriages.

== Death ==
Willi Tokarev died in Moscow on 4 August 2019, reportedly from cancer. He was 84 years old at the time of his death.

== Awards ==
Tokarev was a multiple winner of Radio Chanson's Chanson of the Year Award, the final time being in 2014.
