= Vladlen =

Vladlen (abbreviation of Vladimir Lenin) is a masculine given name of Soviet origin, created after Vladimir Lenin's death as a way to commemorate him. Notable people with the name include:

- Vladlen Babayev (born 1996), Russian footballer
- Vladlen Biryukov(1942–2005), Soviet and Russian actor
- Vladlen Davydov (1924–2012), Russian actor
- Vladlen Koltun, Israeli-American computer scientist
- Vladlen Naumenko (1947-2024), Ukrainian footballer
- Vladlen Pavlenkov (1929–1990), Russian dissident
- Vladlen Tatarsky (1982–2023), real name Maxim Fomin, Ukrainian-born Russian blogger and propagandist
- Vladlen Trostyansky (1935–2014), Ukrainian wrestler
- Vladlen Yurchenko (born 1994), Ukrainian footballer
- Vladlen Zurakhov (1930–1991), Ukrainian chess player

== See also ==
- Vladlena
- Vladilen
