= Vladlen Pavlenkov =

Soviet dissident

Vladlen Konstantinovich Pavlenkov (langx|ru|Владлен КонстантиновичПавленков) (4 May 1929 – 31 January 1990) was a Soviet dissident, noted for his activities related to Soviet-American postal communications during the Cold War.

== Biography ==
He was born in the Soviet Russian city of Nizhny Novgorod in 1929, which was renamed Gorky in 1932. A decorated participant in the Soviet war effort during World War II, he had been given a medal for his volunteer work as a boy during the war. After graduating from GSU (Gorky State University), he worked as a history teacher in Soviet-Bloc East Germany from 1953-1956. Upon returning to his home city of Gorky, he first became a high school principal; then he became a college teacher. He married Svetlana Pavlenkova in 1957. He was arrested in 1969 for accusations of spreading propaganda and inciting agitation. He was given a seven-year sentence, which he served in multiple prisons and labor camps throughout the Soviet Union; the final year and a half of which was in the infamous Vladimir Central Prison. Upon his release, he was under heavy pressure from the KGB (the state security police of the Soviet Union) to emigrate.

In 1979, Vladlen Pavlenkov emigrated to the United States with his wife and son and, speaking little English, found work as a security guard. In 1982, he founded the non-profit Freedom of Communications Committee (FC), whose aim was to promote personal communications between Americans and Soviets through postal mail, telephone, and telegraph.

== Accomplishments ==
In the 1960s, he wrote 2x2=4, one of the first serious studies of the Soviet underground economy. All of the copies were searched for and stolen by the KGB. While Vladlen was against the distribution of flyers, his students did so regardless and ended up getting caught and giving him up. When Vladlen was brought to the KGB building for interrogations, he managed to occupy an office and burn all the dossiers of his criminal case, and some others, with matches. He became the last person arrested on this charge, ending the attempts of prosecution of Gorky’s intellectuals. Through Freedom of Communications, Vladlen published Advice to Mailers in both English and Russian, to help ordinary citizens assure their personal communications were delivered as intended, as well as a periodical newsletter titled Mail to the USSR. Pavlenkov and his organization were also instrumental in introducing five amendments to the Universal Postal Union Congress of 1984, and four more amendments in 1989. These postal codes were key to the successful effort to release other high-profile dissidents from captivity. After his death on January 30, 1990, his book of autobiographical novels “Izbrannoe” was published by FC-Izdat (Arlington, MA, USA) ISBN 5268010883. The book consists of three novels. The first is written before the author emigrates in 1979; the second novel; in 1984, and the third novel, in 1989.

== Sources ==
- Gilman, Benjamin A. (28 February 1990). "A Tribute to Vladlen Konstantinovich Pavlenkov". Congressional Record, 101st Congress. Congress of the United States.
- DeConcini, Dennis (21 February 1990). "Tribute to Vladlen K. Pavlenkov". Congressional Record, 101st Congress. Congress of the United States.
- Pavlenkov, Vladlen (1987). Advice to mailers on sending mail to the USSR. Freedom of Communications Committee.
- Cмутьяны четвертой волны
