= CISA =

CISA or Cisa may refer to:

== Computing and law ==
- Certified Information Systems Auditor, certification for IT audit professionals
- Cybersecurity Information Sharing Act, sharing of information between the U.S. government and companies

== Organizations ==
- China Iron and Steel Association, a non-profit organization
- Costruzioni Italiane Serrature e Affini, Italian manufacturer of locking and access control systems
- Cybersecurity and Infrastructure Security Agency, U.S. cybersecurity agency

=== Education and research ===
- Canadian Institute for the Study of Antisemitism, an academic institute
- Centre for Intelligent Systems and their Applications, University of Edinburgh
- Council of International Students Australia, represents international students in Australia
- Swiss Center for Affective Sciences, Geneva

== Other uses ==
- CISA-DT, TV station in Canada
- Cisa (goddess), a goddess in Germanic paganism

== See also ==
- Kisa (disambiguation)
- Sisa (disambiguation)
- Zisa (disambiguation)
