= Scouting and Guiding in the Solomon Islands =

The Scout and Guide movement in the Solomon Islands is served by

- The Girl Guides Association of the Solomon Islands, member of the World Association of Girl Guides and Girl Scouts
- The Solomon Islands Scout Association, member of the World Organization of the Scout Movement
