= Kisa =

Kisa or KISA may refer to:

== People ==
- Janet Kisa (born 1992), Kenyan runner
- Kisa Gotami, disciple of Buddha
- Rostislav Kiša (born 1978), Czech footballer

== Places ==
- Khisa, also known as Kisa, a village in Botswana
- Kisa, Hiroshima, a former town in Hiroshima Prefecture, Japan, now merged with Miyoshi
  - Kisa Station, a train station in Miyoshi
- Kisa, Iran, a village in Hormozgan Province, Iran
- Kisa, Sweden, a town in Östergötland County, Sweden

== Organizations ==
- Kisa BK, a Swedish football club
- KISA-LD, a low-power television station (channel 22, virtual 40) licensed to serve San Antonio, Texas, United States
- KISA (Cypriot organisation), the Movement for Equality, Support, Anti-Racism (Greek: Κίνηση για Ισότητα, Στήριξη, Αντιρατσισμό, abbreviated to ΚΙΣΑ), a Cypriot non-governmental organization established in 1998
- KISA Phone, an Australian telecommunications services provider founded in 2013
- The Korea Internet & Security Agency

== Other uses ==
- Kisa Sohma, a character in the manga and anime Fruits Basket
- "Kisa the Cat", an Icelandic fairy tale
- Kisa tribe (Luhya), an indigenous tribe of Kenya
