= Zisa =

Zisa may refer to:

- Zisa (goddess), a goddess in Germanic paganism
- Zisa, Palermo, a castle in Italy
- Zisa Corona, corona on Venus

== People with the surname ==
- Alessandro Zisa (born 1965), Italian curler
- Ken Zisa (born 1954), American politician

== See also ==
- Cisa (disambiguation)
