= Andreas Tricomitis =

Greek-Cypriot mixed martial arts fighter

- Born: August 26, 1991 (age 35); Larnaca, Cyprus
- Native name: Ανδρέας Τρικωμίτης
- Nationality: Cypriot
- Height: 5 ft 10 in (1.78 m)
- Weight: 185 lb (84 kg; 13 st 3 lb)
- Division: Middleweight
- Style: Judo
- Team: HAMMA Academy of Mixed Martial Arts
- Rank: 3rd degree Black belt in Judo
- Years active: 2017–present

Mixed martial arts record
- Total: 9
- Wins: 8
- By knockout: 4
- By submission: 1
- By decision: 3
- Losses: 0
- No contests: 1

Other information
- Website: https://www.tapology.com/fightcenter/fighters/65815-andreas-tricomitis

Andreas Tricomitis (Greek: Ανδρέας Τρικωμίτης, born August 26, 1991) is a Greek-Cypriot mixed martial artist and judoka who competes as a Middleweight and Welterweight. Until July 16 of 2024, he was ranked #2 of pro Welterweights in Greece.

== Early life ==
Andreas Tricomitis was born on August 26, 1991, into a native Greek family in Larnaca, Cyprus.

At age 4, he started training Judo and Gymnastics. By the age of 16, he earned his first Black belt in Judo under the Japanese Judo Federation in 2008.

== Mixed martial arts record ==
Professional record breakdown
| 9 matches | 8 wins | 0 losses |
| By knockout | 4 | 0 |
| By submission | 1 | 0 |
| By decision | 3 | 0 |
| No contests | 1 | |

| Res. | Record | Opponent | Method | Event | Date | Round | Time | Location | Notes |
|---|---|---|---|---|---|---|---|---|---|
| Win | 8–0-1 | James Saville | KO (punches) | BMF MMA 3 | July 16, 2022 | 1 | 0:19 | Barnsley, England | Return to welterweight. |
| Win | 7–0-1 | Shaun Lomas | Decision (unanimous) | Full Contact Contender 28 | March 5, 2022 | 3 | 5:00 | Bolton, England | |
| Win | 6–0-1 | Matthew Johnson | TKO (punches) | BMF MMA 1 | October 16, 2021 | 1 | 0:27 | Barnsley, England | Middleweight Debut. |
| Win | 5–0-1 | Robert Oganesyan | TKO (punches) | MMA Challenge Pro 9 | February 2, 2019 | 1 | 1:37 | Thessaloniki, Greece | |
| Win | 4-0-1 | Tom Briggs | TKO (punches) | Almighty Fighting Championship 10 | November 17, 2018 | 1 | 0:42 | York, England | |
| NC | 3–0-1 | Robert Oganesyan | No Contest | MMA Challenge Pro 8 | May 5, 2018 | 3 | 5:00 | Thessaloniki, Greece | |
| Win | 3–0 | Mark Kinsella | Decision (split) | Cage Warriors 90 | February 24, 2018 | 3 | 5:00 | Liverpool, England | |
| Win | 2–0 | Gary Kono | Submission (arm-triangle choke) | Prestige Fight 3 | November 26, 2017 | 1 | 1:59 | Larnaca, Cyprus | |
| Win | 1–0 | Rastislav Toth | Decision (unanimous) | Almighty Fighting Championship 5 | June 17, 2017 | 3 | 5:00 | Leeds, England | |
