= Sisa =

Sisa may refer to:

- SISA, Società Italiana Servizi Aerei, Italian airline and flight training school associated with Cantieri Aeronautici e Navali Triestini (C.R.D.A Canterei), later merged with other airlines to form Ala Littoria
- Solomon Islands Scout Association
- Sisa (1999 film), 1999 Filipino film
- Sisa (2025 film), 2025 Filipino film
- Sisa (drug), a methamphetamine derivative
- Sisa Waqa, Fijian rugby league footballer
- Sisa (supermarket), Italian supermarket chain
- Jaume Sisa (b. 1948), Catalan singer-songwriter
- 989 Studios (formerly Sony Interactive Studios America or SISA), American video game company
- Sisa (footballer) (born 1998), Yousef Abu Jalboush, Jordanian footballer
- Sisa Journal, a South Korean weekly current affairs magazine founded in 1989
