= Demographics of Cyprus =

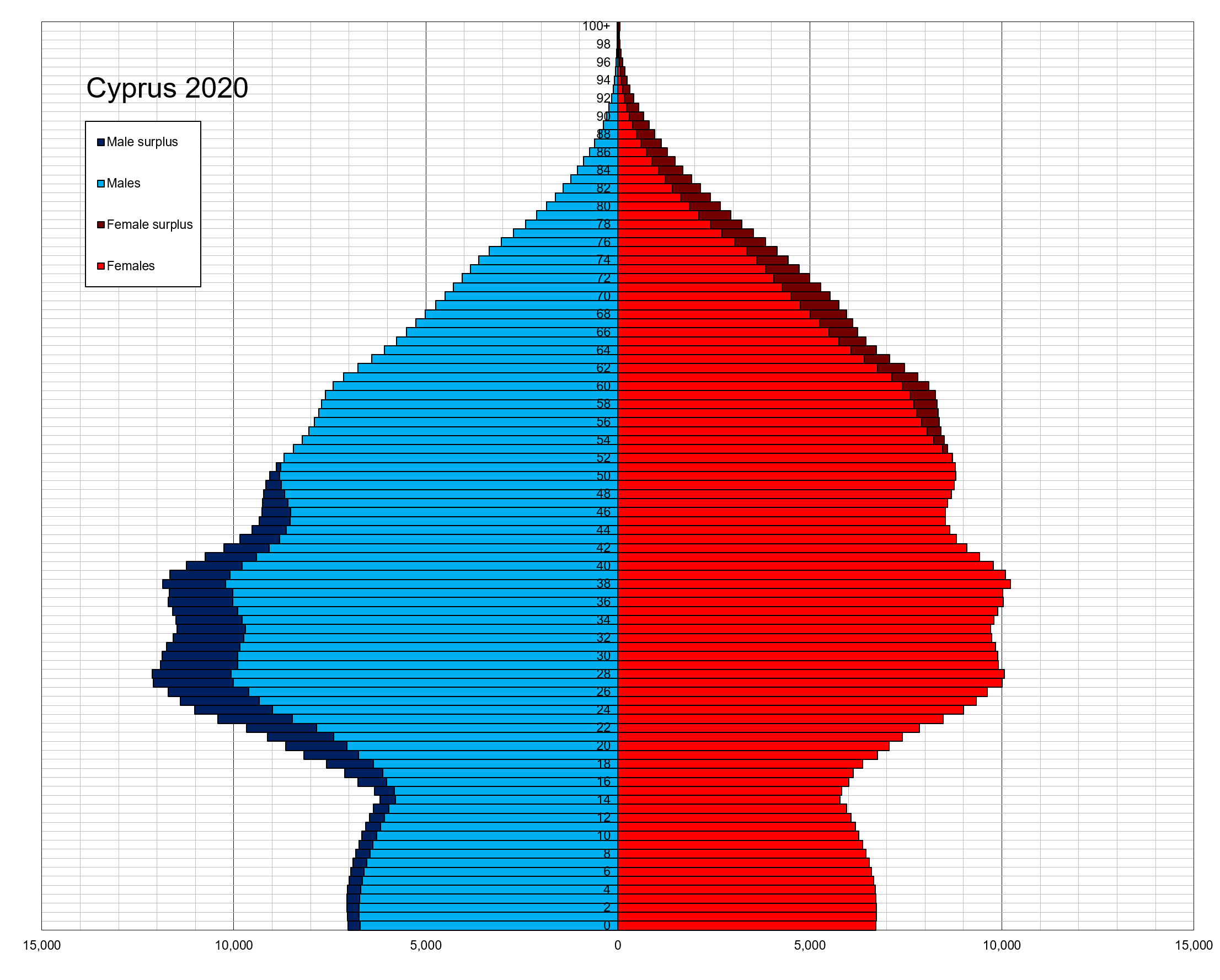
- Population pyramid of Cyprus in 2020
- Population: 1,295,102 (2022 est.)
- Growth rate: 1.06% (2022 est.)
- Birth rate: 10.57 births/1,000 population (2022 est.)
- Death rate: 6.94 deaths/1,000 population (2022 est.)
- Life expectancy: 83 years
  - male: 81 years
  - female: 85 years (2026 est.)
- Fertility rate: 1.48 children born/woman (2022 est.)
- Infant mortality: 8.36 deaths/1,000 live births
- Net migration rate: 6.96 migrant(s)/1,000 population (2022 est.)
- Immigrant share: 14.9% (2024)

Age structure
- 0–14 years: 15.69%
- 65 and over: 12.97%

Sex ratio
- Total: 0.93 male(s)/female (2022 est.)
- At birth: 1.05 male(s)/female
- Under 15: 1.05 male(s)/female
- 65 and over: 0.55 male(s)/female

Nationality
- Nationality: Cypriot
- Major ethnic: Greek Cypriots 98.8%
- Minor ethnic: Others 1% (including Turkish, Armenian, Maronite) and unspecified 0.2%

Language
- Official: Greek, Turkish

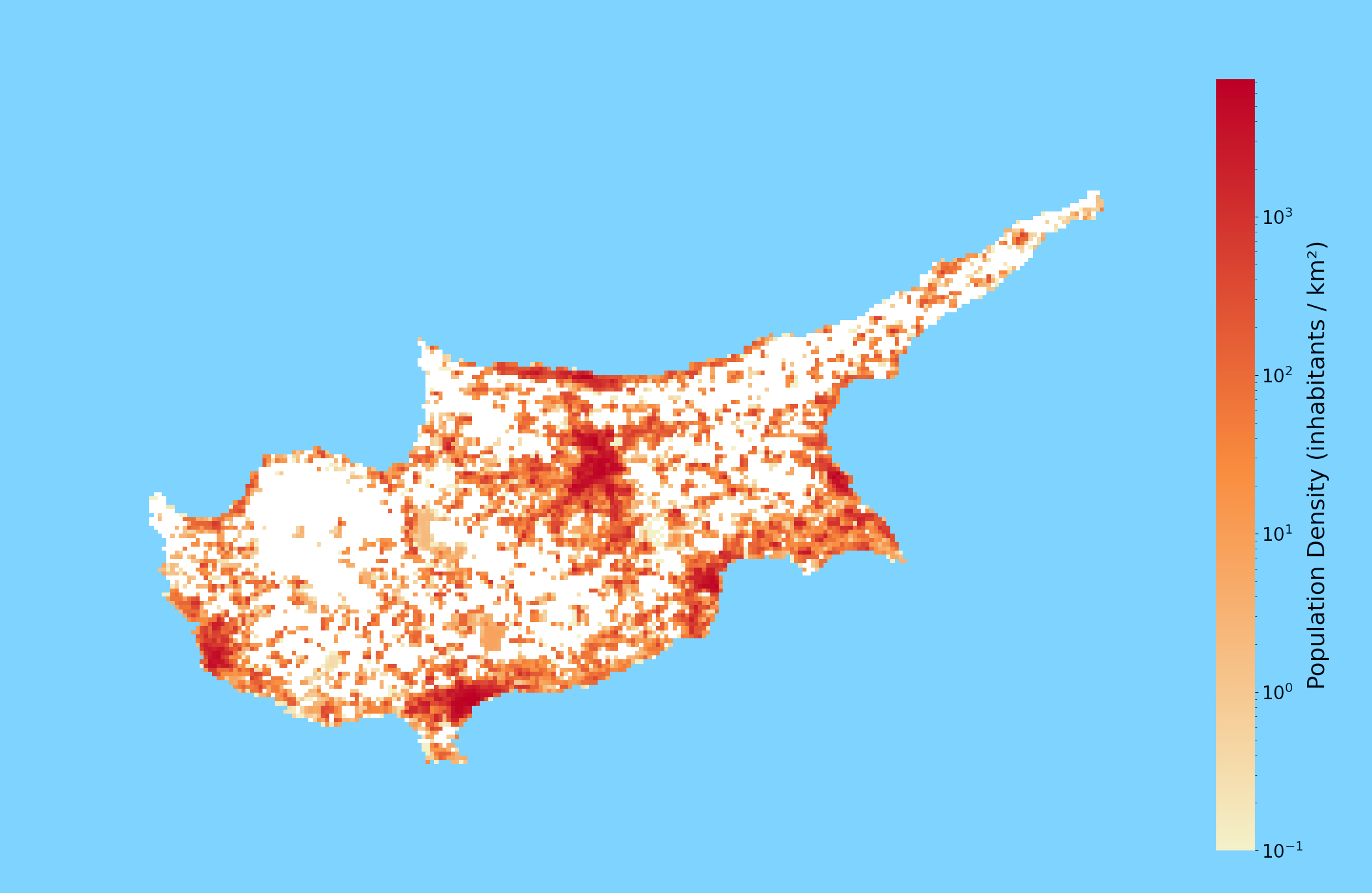
Population density of Cyprus (2023)

Census population and growth rate

Year	Pop.	±% p.a.
1881	186,173	—
1891	209,286	+1.18%
1901	237,022	+1.25%
1911	274,108	+1.46%
1921	310,715	+1.26%
1931	347,915	+1.14%
1946	450,114	+1.73%
1960	573,566	+1.75%

Year	Pop.	±% p.a.
1973	631,788	+0.75%
1976	497,879	−7.63%
1982	522,845	+0.82%
1992	615,013	+1.64%
2001	703,529	+1.51%
2011	840,407	+1.79%
2021	923,272	+0.94%

The post 1974 censuses refer to the government controlled areas.

The people of Cyprus are broadly divided into two main ethnic communities, Greek Cypriots and Turkish Cypriots, who share many cultural traits but maintain distinct identities based on ethnicity, religion, language, and close ties with Greece and Turkey respectively. Before the dispute started in 1964 the peoples of Cyprus (then 77.1% Greek Cypriots, 18.2% Turkish Cypriots, <5% other communities, primarily Armenians, Maronites, and other Lebanese) were dispersed over the entire island.

The Turkish invasion of Cyprus in 1974 de facto partitioned the island into two political areas: 99.5% of Greek Cypriots now live in the south part of the Republic of Cyprus while 98.7% of Turkish Cypriots live in northern areas. (99.2% of other nationalities live in the Greek Cypriot areas in the center, west, east and south). Greek and Cypriot dialect are predominantly spoken in the east, west, south and centre, where the majority are Greek Cypriots, and Turkish Cypriot Dialect in the north, where the majority are Turkish Cypriots. English is widely used throughout the island, as a common language.

The total population of Cyprus as of the end of 2006 was slightly over 1 million, comprising 789,300 in the territory controlled by the government of the Republic of Cyprus and 294,406 in the northern areas of Cyprus. The population of the northern areas of Cyprus has increased following the immigration of 150,000–160,000 Turkish mainlanders, which the UN confirmed to have arrived illegally. On this basis, the Republic of Cyprus government does not include this group in the population statistics of the Republic of Cyprus Statistical Service.

== Population ==
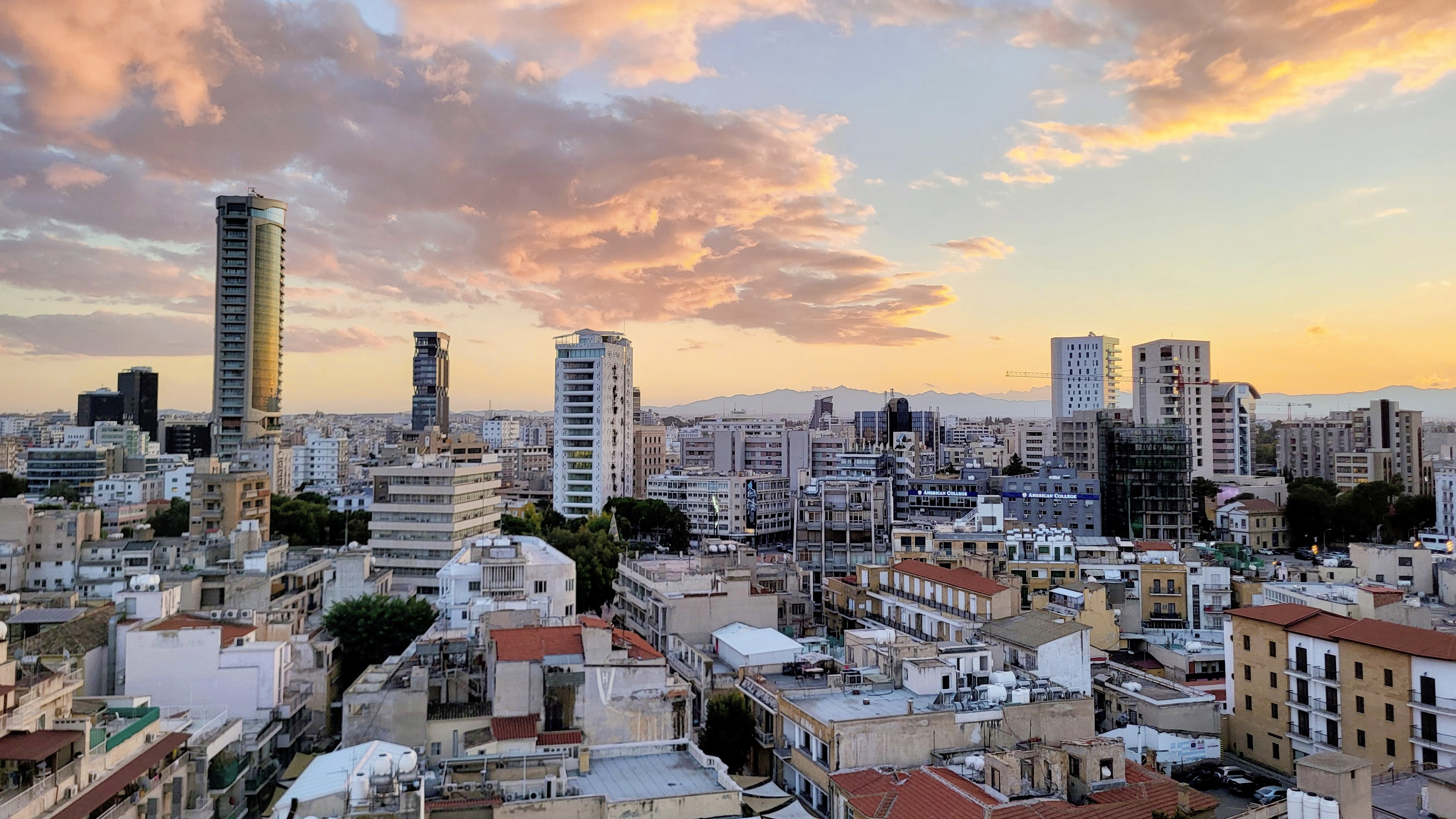
Urban skyline of Nicosia

923,381 in Republic of Cyprus controlled area (2021 census)
476,214 in Turkish-occupied part of Cyprus (2023 population estimate).

Population by citizenship

Republic of Cyprus government controlled area:

1992 census: 95.8% Cypriot, 4.2% Non-Cypriot
2001 census: 90.6% Cypriot, 9.4% Non-Cypriot
2011 census: 78.6% Cypriot, 21.4% Non-Cypriot (preliminary)
2021 census: 77.9% Cypriot, 21.7% non-Cypriot

northern areas of Cyprus:

2006 census (de facto population): 66.7% NC, 29.3% Turkey, 4.0% other

== Vital statistics ==
=== Cyprus (1901–2015) ===
Population of Cyprus (entire island) 1901–2015.

Historical data about main demographic indicators from 1901 to 1989, for the entire island:

Year	Total population	Live births^{1}	Deaths^{1}	Natural change	Crude birth rate (per 1000)	Crude death rate (per 1000)	Natural change (per 1000)	Crude migration change (per 1000)
1901	238,000	7,300	4,300	3,000	30.6	18.1	12.5	
1902	241,000	6,700	3,500	3,200	28.0	14.6	13.4	-0.8
1903	245,000	7,000	3,600	3,400	28.6	14.6	14.0	2.4
1904	249,000	7,600	3,700	3,900	30.4	14.8	15.6	0.4
1905	253,000	7,500	4,500	3,000	29.6	17.7	11.9	4
1906	257,000	7,900	4,100	3,800	30.7	15.8	14.9	0.8
1907	260,000	8,200	4,600	3,600	31.4	17.7	13.7	-2.3
1908	264,000	8,700	5,200	3,500	32.9	19.7	13.2	1.9
1909	268,000	8,000	4,500	3,500	29.8	16.9	12.9	1.9
1910	271,000	8,700	4,100	4,600	32.1	15.2	16.9	-5.9
1911	275,000	8,700	4,500	4,200	31.6	16.2	15.4	-0.7
1912	279,000	8,000	4,900	3,100	28.5	17.7	10.8	3.2
1913	283,000	8,700	5,300	3,400	30.7	18.8	11.9	2.1
1914	287,000	9,500	5,100	4,400	33.1	17.6	15.5	-1.4
1915	291,000	10,000	5,800	4,200	34.3	19.8	14.5	-0.7
1916	294,000	5,900	5,300	600	20.0	17.9	2.1	8.2
1917	297,000	8,800	5,400	3,400	29.5	18.2	11.3	-1.3
1918	301,000	9,900	6,900	3,000	32.9	22.9	10.0	3.3
1919	305,000	8,900	5,200	3,700	29.2	17.2	12.0	1
1920	309,000	9,100	7,400	1,700	29.5	23.9	5.6	7.4
1921	312,000	8,400	6,200	2,200	26.8	20.0	6.8	2.6
1922	315,000	9,000	6,200	2,800	28.6	19.6	9.0	0.6
1923	318,000	8,100	5,700	2,400	25.5	18.0	7.5	1.9
1924	322,000	8,800	5,600	3,200	27.3	17.4	9.9	2.5
1925	326,000	8,300	4,700	3,600	25.6	14.4	11.2	1.2
1926	330,000	8,500	5,600	2,900	25.9	17.1	8.8	3.3
1927	333,000	8,400	5,200	3,200	25.2	15.6	9.6	-0.6
1928	337,000	9,700	5,100	4,600	28.9	15.2	13.7	-1.8
1929	341,000	10,400	4,600	5,800	30.4	13.5	16.9	-5.3
1930	345,000	11,100	5,700	5,400	32.1	16.4	15.7	-4.1
1931	349,000	10,500	5,900	4,600	30.2	17.0	13.2	-1.7
1932	352,000	10,100	5,740	4,360	28.7	16.3	12.4	-3.9
1933	356,000	9,750	4,910	4,840	27.4	13.8	13.6	-2.4
1934	360,000	10,852	4,757	6,095	30.1	13.2	16.9	-5.8
1935	363,000	11,735	4,976	6,759	32.3	13.7	18.6	-10.4
1936	367,000	12,727	4,656	8,071	34.7	12.7	22.0	-11.1
1937	371,000	10,954	6,334	4,620	29.5	17.1	12.5	-1.7
1938	376,000	11,804	5,445	6,359	31.4	14.5	16.9	-3.6
1939	393,000	12,214	5,519	6,695	31.1	14.0	17.0	26.2
1940	401,000	13,254	4,678	8,576	33.1	11.7	21.4	-1.4
1941	409,000	11,402	5,058	6,344	27.9	12.4	15.5	4
1942	412,000	9,221	6,747	2,474	22.4	16.4	6.0	1.3
1943	416,000	12,405	5,155	7,250	29.8	12.4	17.4	-7.8
1944	425,000	14,330	4,263	10,067	33.7	10.0	23.7	-2.5
1945	435,000	13,269	4,111	9,158	30.5	9.5	21.1	1.9
1946	447,000	14,482	3,793	10,689	32.4	11.0	23.9	2.9
1947	458,000	15,158	3,875	11,283	33.1	11.0	24.6	-0.6
1948	477,000	15,078	5,250	9,828	31.6	11.0	20.6	19.2
1949	485,000	13,234	5,290	7,944	27.3	11.0	16.4	0.1
1950	494,000	14,517	5,340	9,187	29.4	11.0	18.6	-0.4
1951	502,000	14,403	5,370	9,043	28.7	10.5	18.0	-2.1
1952	508,000	13,358	5,380	7,968	26.3	10.5	15.7	-3.9
1953	515,000	13,446	5,410	8,036	26.1	10.5	15.6	-2
1954	523,000	13,893	5,490	8,403	26.6	10.5	16.1	-0.8
1955	530,000	13,747	5,570	8,177	25.9	10.5	15.4	-2.2
1956	536,000	13,875	5,630	8,215	25.9	10.5	15.3	-4.1
1957	546,000	14,100	5,730	8,350	25.8	10.5	15.3	3
1958	558,000	14,320	5,860	8,480	25.7	10.5	15.2	6.3
1959	567,000	14,411	5,950	8,491	25.4	10.5	15.0	0.9
1960	573,000	14,500	6,020	8,510	25.3	10.5	14.9	-4.4
1961	575,000	15,059	6,206	8,853	26.2	10.8	15.4	-11.9
1962	577,000	14,787	6,101	8,686	25.6	10.6	15.0	-11.6
1963	582,000	14,602	6,079	8,523	25.1	10.4	14.6	-6.1
1964	587,000	14,224	6,206	8,018	24.2	10.6	13.7	-5.1
1965	591,000	13,707	6,061	7,646	23.2	10.3	12.9	-6.2
1966	595,000	13,250	5,991	7,259	22.3	10.1	12.2	-5.5
1967	599,000	12,788	5,971	6,817	21.3	10.0	11.4	-4.7
1968	604,000	12,403	5,958	6,445	20.5	9.9	10.7	-2.4
1969	609,000	12,046	5,946	6,100	19.8	9.8	10.0	-1.8
1970	614,000	11,801	5,998	5,803	19.2	9.8	9.4	-1.3
1971	620,000	11,641	5,983	5,658	18.8	9.7	9.1	0.6
1972	627,000	11,620	6,043	5,577	18.5	9.6	8.9	2.3
1973	634,000	11,600	6,047	5,553	18.3	9.5	8.8	2.3
1974	630,000	10,578	6,900	3,678	16.8	11.0	5.8	-12.2
1975	610,000	9,768	4,823	4,945	16.0	7.9	8.1	-40.9
1976	599,000	11,194	5,148	6,046	18.7	8.6	10.1	-28.5
1977	599,000	10,951	5,445	5,506	18.3	9.1	9.2	-9.2
1978	601,000	11,299	5,048	6,251	18.8	8.4	10.4	-7.1
1979	605,000	11,920	5,083	6,837	19.7	8.4	11.3	-4.7
1980	611,000	12,464	5,682	6,782	20.4	9.3	11.1	-1.3
1981	618,000	12,111	5,190	6,921	19.6	8.4	11.2	0.1
1982	625,000	12,985	5,307	7,678	20.8	8.5	12.3	-1.1
1983	632,000	13,078	5,433	7,645	20.7	8.6	12.1	-1
1984	640,000	13,182	5,119	8,063	20.6	8.0	12.6	-0.1
1985	648,000	12,622	5,502	7,120	19.5	8.5	11.0	1.4
1986	654,000	12,753	5,494	7,259	19.5	8.4	11.1	-1.9
1987	660,000	12,331	5,869	6,462	18.7	8.9	9.8	-0.7
1988	665,000	12,753	5,845	6,908	19.2	8.8	10.4	-2.9
1989	671,000	12,141	5,702	6,439	18.1	8.5	9.6	-0.7

^{1} The numbers of births and deaths 1901–1932 are estimates calculated from the birth and death rates.

=== Area under the effective control of the Republic of Cyprus ===
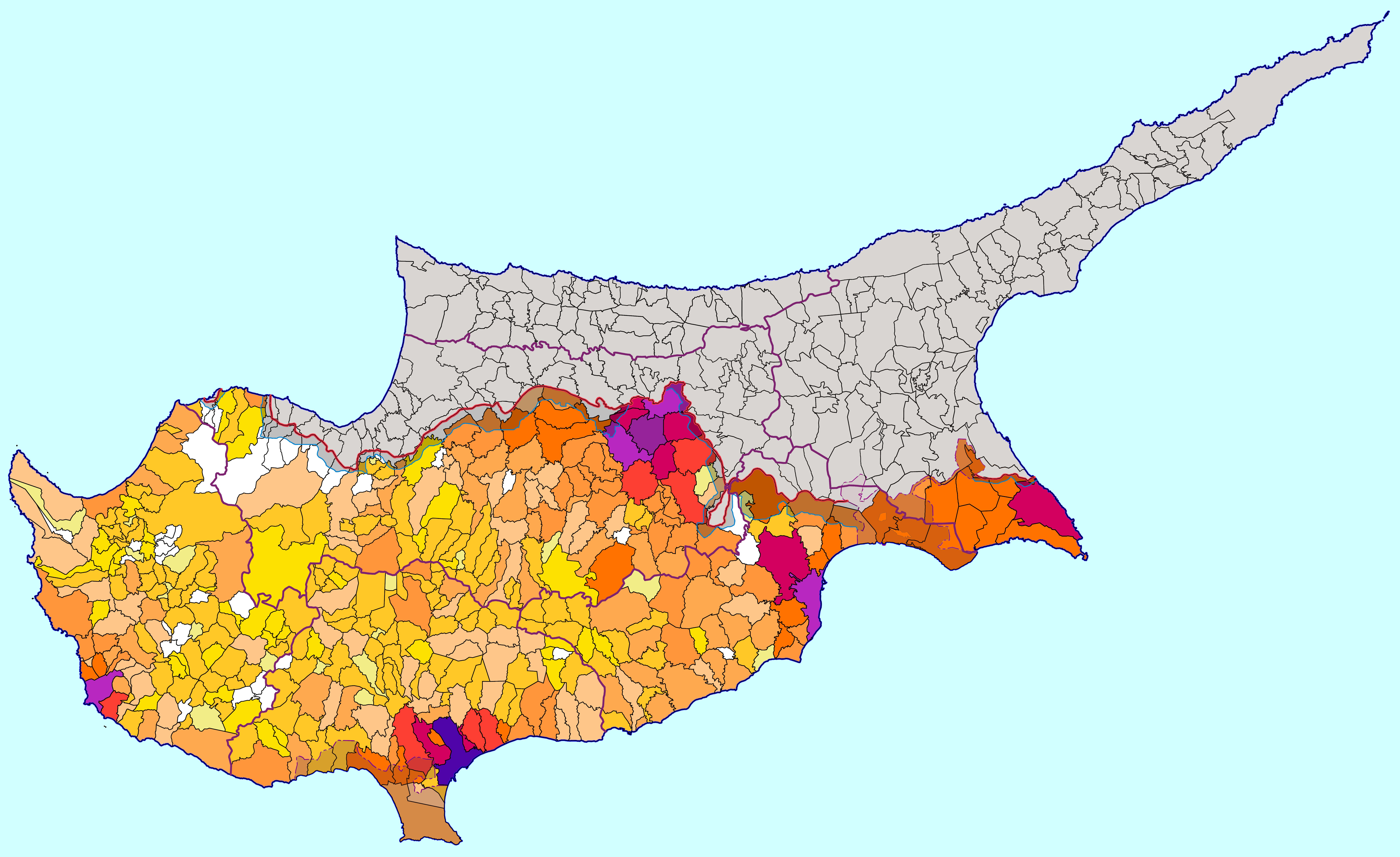
Population map of Southern Cyprus, with number of resident per district, expressed by color gradient.

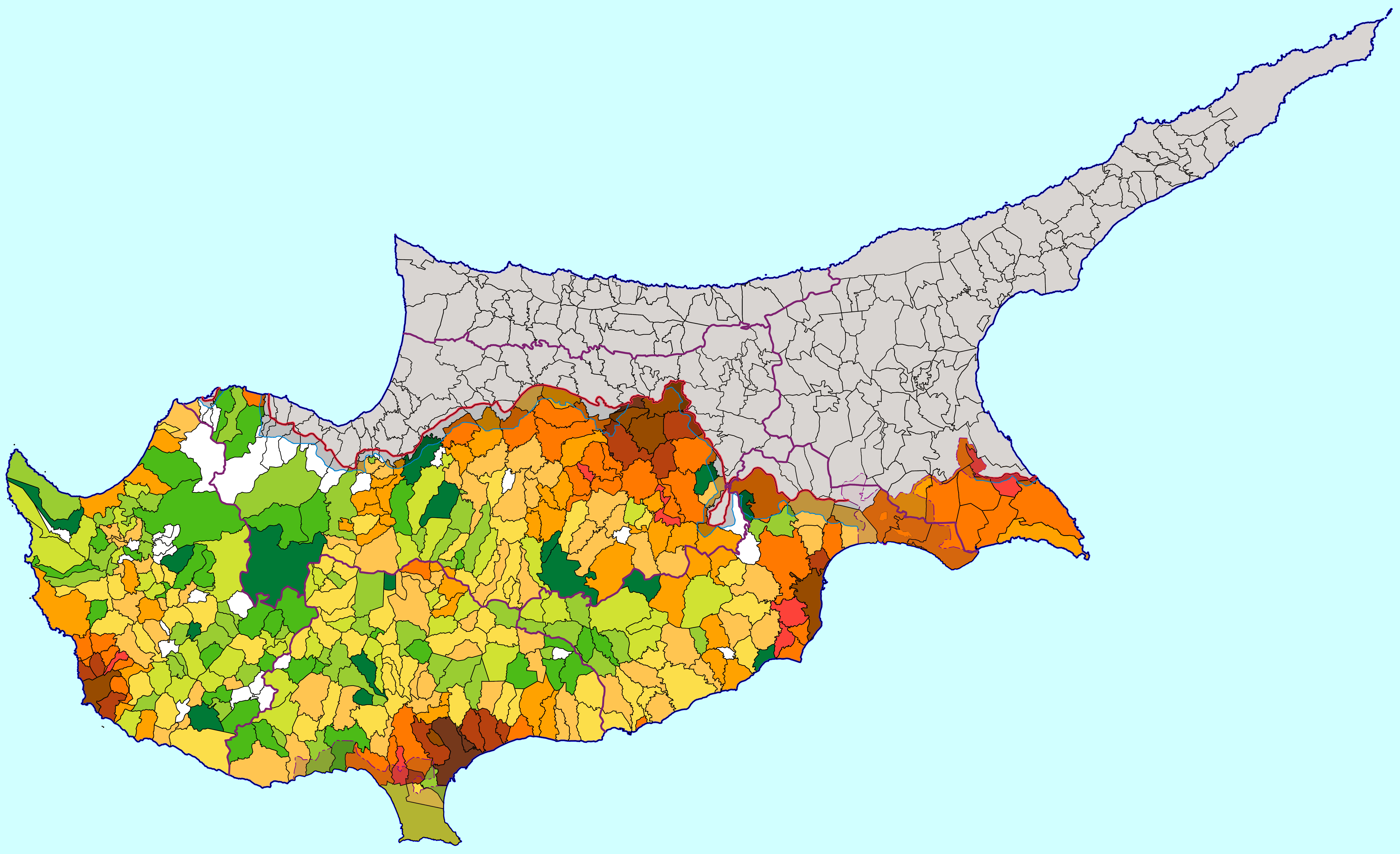
Population density map of Southern Cyprus, with residents per km² (2001 census), expressed by color gradient.

Historical data about main demographic indicators from 1990 to 2022, for the southern part of the island:

Notable events in Cyprus demographics:

- 1974 – Turkish invasion of Cyprus
- 2012–2013 Cypriot financial crisis

	Average population	Live births	Deaths	Natural change	Crude birth rate (per 1000)	Crude death rate (per 1000)	Natural change (per 1000)	Crude migration change (per 1000)	Total fertility rate	Infant mortality rate
1990	579,400	10,622	4,844	5,778	18.3	8.4	10.0		2.42	11.0
1991	594,900	10,442	5,075	5,367	17.6	8.5	9.0	17	2.33	11.0
1992	610,600	11,372	5,220	6,152	18.6	8.5	10.1	15.6	2.49	10.0
1993	625,800	10,514	4,789	5,725	16.8	7.7	9.1	15.1	2.24	8.6
1994	639,000	10,379	4,924	5,455	16.2	7.7	8.5	12.1	2.17	8.6
1995	650,700	9,869	4,935	4,934	15.2	7.6	7.6	10.4	2.03	8.5
1996	660,900	9,638	4,958	4,680	14.6	7.5	7.1	8.4	1.96	8.3
1997	670,400	9,275	5,173	4,102	13.8	7.7	6.1	8.1	1.87	8.0
1998	678,900	8,879	5,432	3,447	13.1	8.0	5.1	7.4	1.76	7.0
1999	686,400	8,505	5,070	3,435	12.4	7.4	5.0	5,9	1.67	6.0
2000	693,600	8,447	5,355	3,092	12.2	7.7	4.5	5.9	1.64	5.6
2001	701,300	8,167	4,827	3,340	11.6	6.9	4.8	6.2	1.57	4.9
2002	709,100	7,883	5,168	2,715	11.1	7.3	3.8	7.2	1.49	4.7
2003	717,800	8,088	5,200	2,888	11.3	7.2	4.0	8.1	1.51	4.1
2004	727,500	8,309	5,225	3,084	11.4	7.2	4.2	9.1	1.52	3.5
2005	738,100	8,243	5,425	2,818	11.2	7.3	3.8	10.5	1.48	4.6
2006	750,300	8,731	5,127	3,604	11.6	6.8	4.8	11.5	1.52	3.1
2007	766,400	8,575	5,380	3,195	11.2	7.0	4.2	16.8	1.44	3.1
2008	785,700	9,205	5,194	4,011	11.7	6.6	5.1	19.5	1.48	3.5
2009	807,100	9,608	5,182	4,426	11.9	6.4	5.5	21	1.48	3.3
2010	827,700	9,801	5,103	4,698	11.8	6.2	5.6	19.2	1.44	3.2
2011	849,000	9,622	5,504	4,118	11.3	6.5	4.8	20.2	1.35	3.1
2012	863,900	10,161	5,507	4,654	11.8	6.4	5.4	11.9	1.40	3.4
2013	861,900	9,341	5,150	4,191	10.8	6.0	4.9	-7.2	1.31	1.6
2014	853,200	9,258	5,426	3,832	10.8	6.3	4.5	-14.7	1.31	1.9
2015	843,100	9,170	5,882	3,288	10.6	6.8	3.8	-15.9	1.31	2.6
2016	849,800	9,455	5,472	3,983	10.9	6.3	4.6	3.2	1.36	2.7
2017	860,200	9,229	6,034	3,195	10.6	6.9	3.7	8.4	1.34	1.4
2018	870,800	9,329	5,812	3,517	10.6	6.6	4.0	8.1	1.36	2.6
2019	880,600	9,548	6,267	3,281	10.7	7.0	3.7	7.4	1.40	2.8
2020	896,000	9,930	6,381	2.297	10.9	7.2	3.7	14.6	1.45	2.1
2021	904,700	10,309	7,250	3,059	11.2	7.9	3.3	6.2	1.46	2.9
2022	920,700	10,187	7,307	2,880	10.9	7.8	3.1	14.3	1.44	3.3
2023	933,500	10,241	6,742	3,499	10.7	7.0	3.7	10	1.45	4.5
2024	966,400	9,766	6,753	3,013	10.0	6.9	3.1	30.9	1.40	
2025	983,000	9,230	6,804	2,426	9.3	6.9	2.4		1.34 (e)	
2026	996,600									

View source data.
View source data.
View source data.
View source data.

==== Current vital statistics ====
Period	Live births	Deaths	Natural increase
January - June 2024	4,595	3,353	+1,242
January - June 2025	4,368	3,703	+665
Difference	▼ –227 (-4.94%)	▲ +350 (+10.44%)	▼ –577

=== Life expectancy ===
Life expectancy in Cyprus since 1895

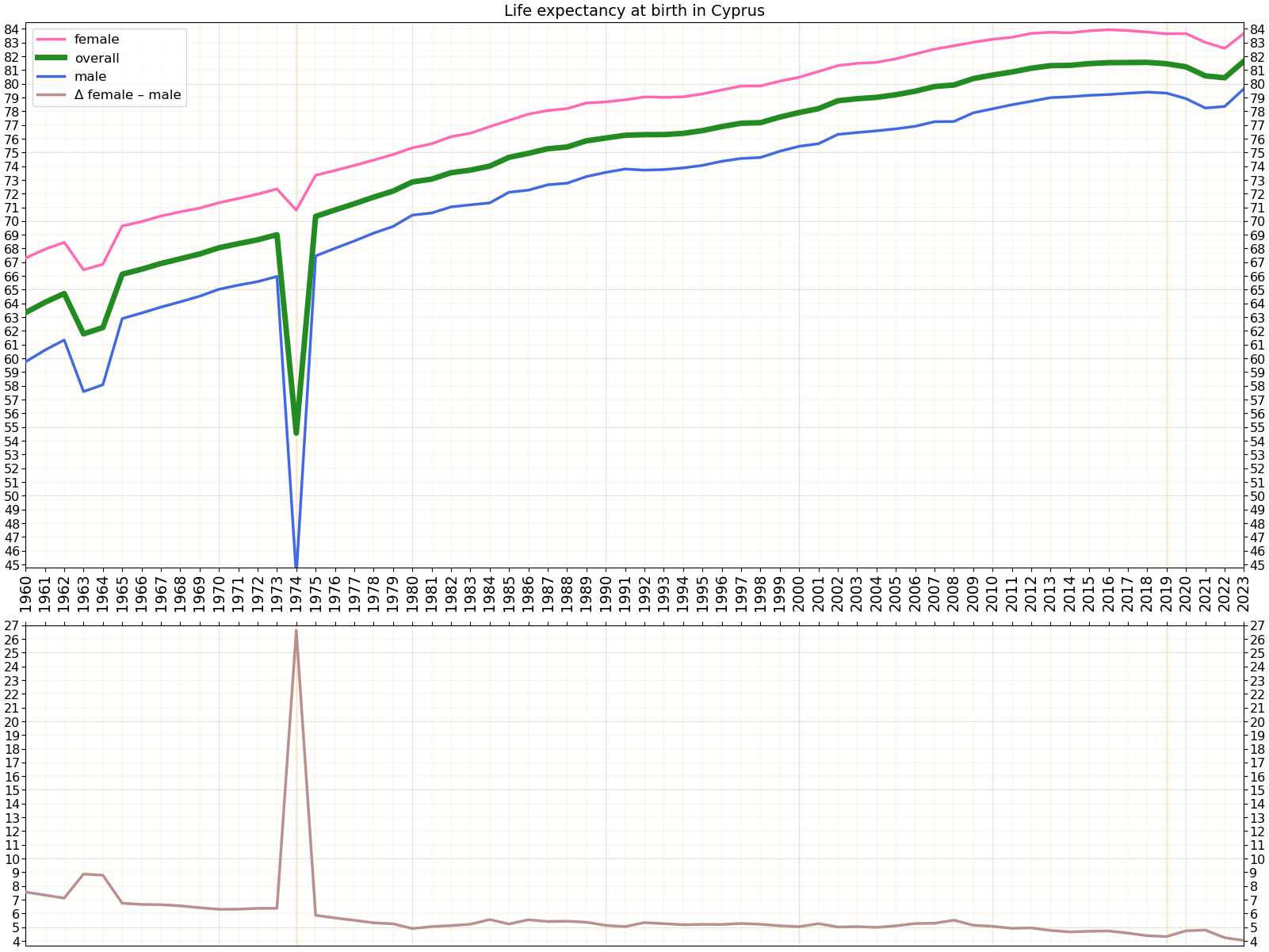
Life expectancy in Cyprus since 1960 by gender

Period	Life expectancy in Years	Period	Life expectancy in Years
1950–1955	66.7	1985–1990	76.1
1955–1960	70.4	1990–1995	76.9
1960–1965	71.9	1995–2000	77.7
1965–1970	73.1	2000–2005	78.3
1970–1975	74.3	2005–2010	79.0
1975–1980	75.3	2010–2015	79.9
1980–1985	76.1	2015–2020	81.23

Source: UN World Population Prospects

=== Structure of the population ===
Structure of the population (Census 01.X.2011) (Data refer to government controlled areas):

Age Group	Male	Female	Total	%
Total	408 780	431 627	840 407	100
0–4	23 061	21 954	45 015	5.36
5–9	21 921	20 714	42 635	5.07
10–14	24 179	23 119	47 298	5.63
15–19	28 683	27 135	55 818	6.64
20–24	33 891	32 182	66 073	7.86
25–29	36 992	37 122	74 114	8.82
30–34	33 149	36 685	69 834	8.31
35–39	27 754	34 108	61 862	7.36
40–44	27 031	32 697	59 728	7.11
45–49	27 059	30 181	57 240	6.81
50–54	27 517	28 611	56 128	6.68
55–59	23 771	23 991	47 762	5.68
60–64	22 057	22 977	45 034	5.36
65–69	17 656	18 672	36 328	4.32
70–74	14 044	15 389	29 433	3.50
75–79	9 647	11 411	21 058	2.51
80+	10 342	14 606	24 948	2.97
unknown	26	73	99	0.01
Age group	Male	Female	Total	Percent
0–14	69 161	65 787	134 948	16.06
15–64	287 904	305 689	593 593	70.63
65+	51 689	60 078	111 767	13.30

Population Estimates by Sex and Age Group (01.I.2021) (Data refer to government controlled areas):

Age Group	Male	Female	Total	%
Total	437 650	458 357	896 007	100
0–4	24 397	23 215	47 612	5.31
5–9	25 158	23 494	48 652	5.43
10–14	24 346	23 093	47 439	5.29
15–19	24 300	23 883	48 183	5.38
20–24	30 113	31 925	62 038	6.92
25–29	36 723	38 452	75 175	8.39
30–34	37 166	38 393	75 559	8.43
35–39	33 894	36 196	70 090	7.82
40–44	28 988	32 142	61 130	6.82
45–49	25 801	27 736	53 537	5.98
50–54	26 249	27 426	53 675	5.99
55–59	27 023	27 722	54 745	6.11
60–64	25 117	25 751	50 868	5.68
65–69	21 930	22 897	44 827	5.00
70–74	19 071	20 847	39 918	4.46
75–79	12 852	15 139	27 991	3.12
80–84	8 708	11 190	19 898	2.22
85–89	4 101	6 295	10 396	1.16
90–94	1 327	1 964	3 291	0.37
95–99	327	507	834	0.09
100+	59	90	149	0.02
Age group	Male	Female	Total	Percent
0–14	73 901	69 802	143 703	16.04
15–64	295 374	309 626	605 000	67.52
65+	68 375	78 929	147 304	16.44

== Historical population ==
Turkish Cypriots were the majority of the population registered for taxation between 1777 and 1800. However, it is likely that the Muslim population never exceeded 35-40 per cent of the total population of Cyprus. Rather, many Orthodox Christians registered as Muslims in order to reduce taxation from the government.

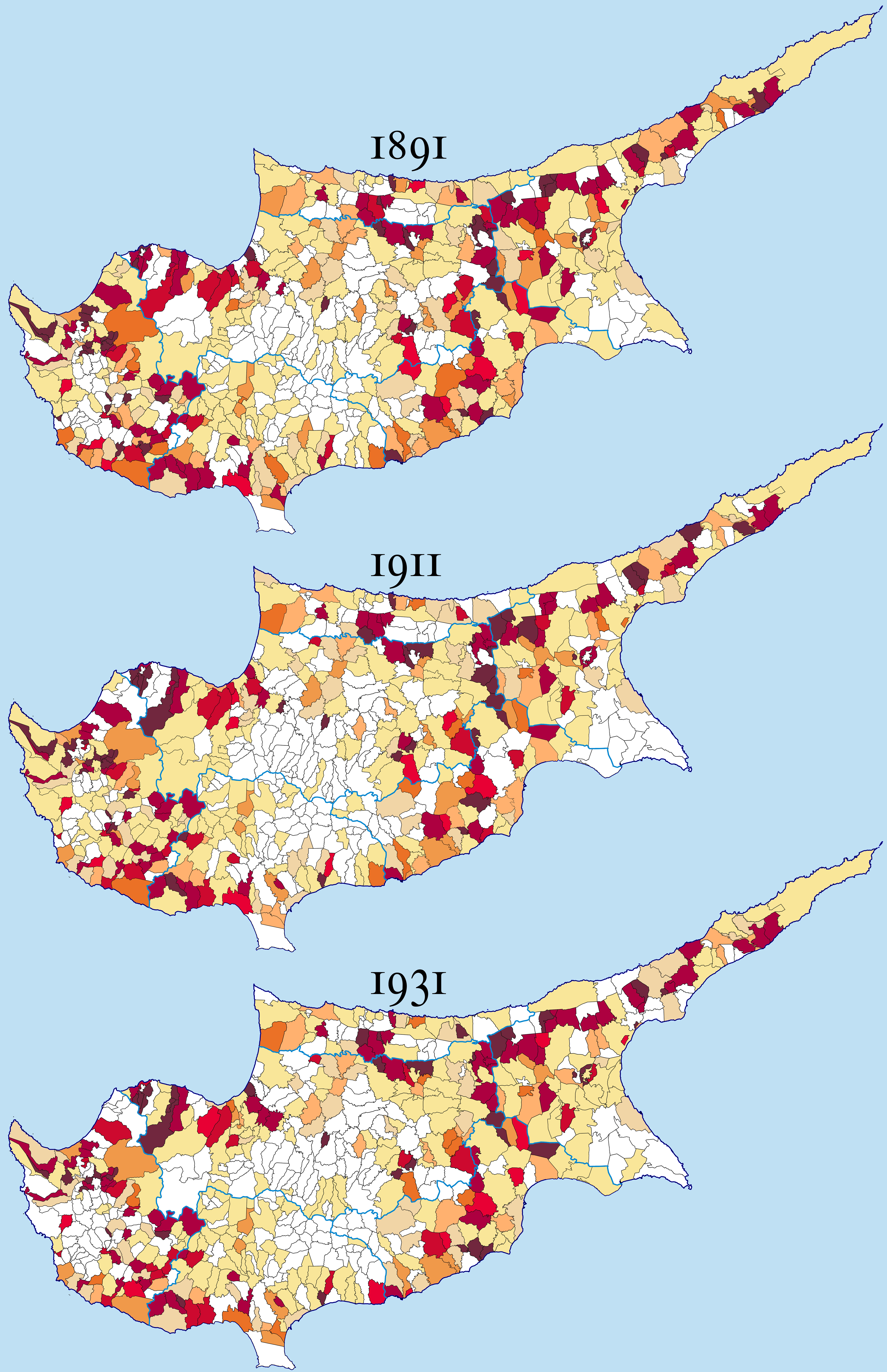
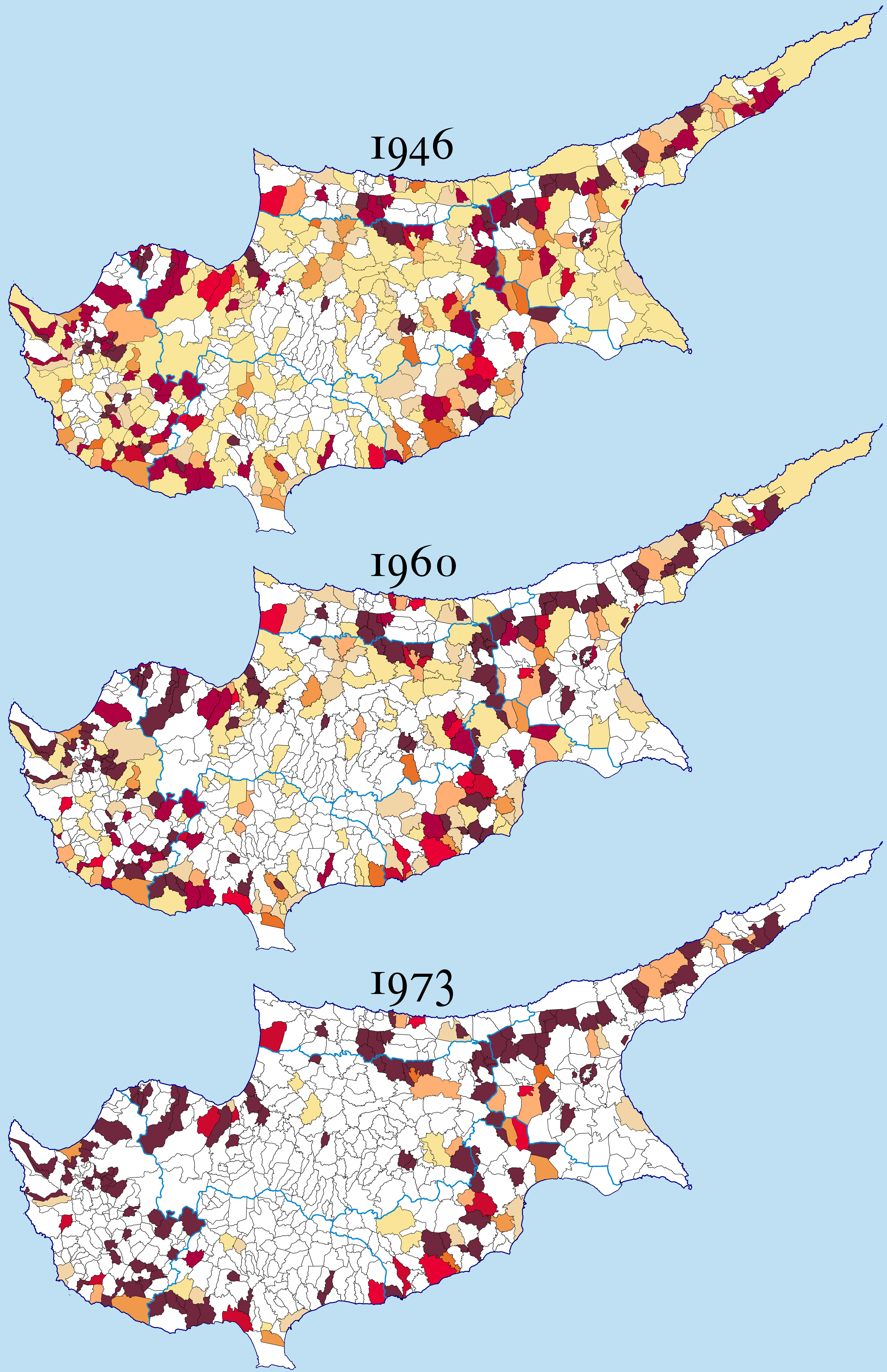
Distribution of Turkish Cypriots (1891–1973)

Tax Registered Population of Cyprus by ethnicity 1777–1800
census year	Greeks		Turks		Armenians		Maronites		Others		Total
census year	#	%	#	%	#	%	#	%	#	%	Total
1777	37,000	44.0%	47,000	56.0%	—N/a	—N/a	—N/a	—N/a	—N/a	—N/a	84,000
1790	47,500	41.5%	67,000	58.5%	—N/a	—N/a	—N/a	—N/a	—N/a	—N/a	114,500
1793	46,392	39.3%	67,000	58.8%	—N/a	—N/a	—N/a	—N/a	4,608	3.9%	118,000
1800	30,524	31.3%	67,000	68.7%	—N/a	—N/a	—N/a	—N/a	—N/a	—N/a	97,524

Population of Cyprus according to ethnicity (1881–2011)
census year	Greeks		Turks		Armenians		Maronites		Others		Total
census year	#	%	#	%	#	%	#	%	#	%	Total
1881	137,631	73.9%	45,458	24.4%	174	0.1%	830	0.4%	1,738	0.9%	186,173
1891	158,585	75.8%	47,926	22.9%	280	0.1%	1,131	0.5%	1,364	0.7%	209,286
1901	182,739	77.1%	51,309	21.6%	517	0.2%	1,130	0.5%	1,327	0.6%	237,022
1911	214,480	78.2%	56,428	20.6%	558	0.2%	1,073	—N/a	1,569	—N/a	274,108
1921	244,887	78.8%	61,339	19.7%	1,197	0.4%	1,350	—N/a	1,942	—N/a	310,715
1931	276,572	79.5%	64,238	18.5%	3,377	1%	1,704	—N/a	2,068	—N/a	347,959
1946	361,199	80.2%	80,548	17.9%	3,686	0.8%	2,083	—N/a	2,598	—N/a	450,114
1960	442,363	77.1%	104,333	18.2%	3,630	—N/a	2,752	—N/a	20,488	—N/a	573,566
2011 (Note: in the territory controlled by the Republic of Cyprus)	659,115	98.8%	1,128	0.2%	1,831	0.3%	3,656	0.5%	1,460	0.2%	667,398
2021 (Note: in the territory controlled by the Republic of Cyprus)	728,796	78.93%	1,617	0.18%	3,434	0.37%	5,245	0.57%	184,289	19.96%	923,381

In the census from 1881 to 1960, all Muslims are counted as Turks, only Greek Orthodox are counted as Greeks. There were small populations of Greek-speaking Muslims and Turkish-speaking Greek Orthodox.

In total, between 1955 and 1973, 16,519 Turks and 71,036 Greeks emigrated from the country. Of the emigrated Turkish Cypriots in this period, only 290 went to Turkey. In the 2011 census, 208 people stated their ethnic origin as being Latin.

== Fertility ==
In 2020, 39% of children born in Cyprus were to mothers of foreign origin, both from non-EU countries and from other EU member states.

Years	1875	1876	1877	1878	1879	1880	1881	1882	1883	1884
Total Fertility Rate in Cyprus	6.03	5.96	5.88	5.81	5.73	5.66	5.58	5.51	5.44	5.36

Years	1885	1886	1887	1888	1889	1890	1891	1892	1893	1894
Total Fertility Rate in Cyprus	5.29	5.21	5.14	5.07	4.99	4.92	4.84	4.77	4.69	4.62

Years	1895	1896	1897	1898	1899
Total Fertility Rate in Cyprus	4.55	4.47	4.4	4.32	4.25

== Immigration ==
Large-scale demographic changes have been caused since 1964 by the movements of peoples across the island and the later influx of settlers from Turkey to northern Cyprus. According to the 2011 Census there are 170,383 non-citizens living in Cyprus, of whom 106,270 are EU citizens and 64,113 are from third countries. The largest EU groups by nationality are Greeks (29,321), Romanians (23,706) and Bulgarians (18,536). The largest non-EU groups are British (24,046), Filipinos (9,413), Russians (8,164), Sri Lankans (7,269) and Vietnamese (7,028). There are an estimated 20–25,000 undocumented migrants from third countries also living in the Republic, though migrant rights groups dispute these figures. The demographic changes in society have led to some racist incidents, and the formation of the charity KISA in response.

The demographic character of northern Cyprus changed after the Turkish invasion in 1974 and especially during the last 10–15 years. TRNC census carried out in April 2006 showed that out of a total population of 256,644 in northern Cyprus, 132,635, or 52%, were Turkish Cypriots in the sense that they were born in Cyprus of at least one Cyprus-born parent (for 120,007 of these both parents were Cyprus-born). In addition, 43,062 so called TRNC citizens (17%) had at least one non-Cypriot Turkish-born parent, 2,334 so called TRNC citizens (1%) had parents born in other countries, 70,525 residents (27%) had Turkish citizenship, and 8,088 (3%) were citizens of other countries (mainly UK, Bulgaria, and Iran).

Based on these census data, it is estimated that 113,687 northern Cyprus residents, or 44% of the population, are not Turkish Cypriots properly speaking, but are in fact "Turkish immigrants" or "Turkish settlers" from Anatolia. Alternative sources suggest that the Turkish Cypriots in northern Cyprus are today outnumbered by the Turkish settlers, contrary to the picture presented by the 2006 so called TRNC census.

Settlement in northern Cyprus, especially if accompanied by naturalization, is in violation of article 49 of the Geneva Conventions Protocol of 1977, since the Turkish occupation has been declared illegal by the UN. The UN General Assembly have stated the settlement of Turkish mainlanders, "constitute[s] a form of colonialism and attempt to change illegally the demographic structure of Cyprus". The Republic of Cyprus considers these Turkish immigrants to be "illegal settlers" and does not include them in the population estimates for the entire island published by the Republic of Cyprus Statistical Service.

== Net migration ==
Net migration of Cyprus (1981–1997)
Year	Net Migration
1981	196
1982	-31
1983	518
1984	155
1985	238
1986	175
1987	272
1988	257
1989	4,526
1990	8,707
1991	10,559
1992	9,999
1993	8,000
1994	7,000
1995	6,000
1996	5,300
1997	4,800

Cyprus immigration, emigration, and net migration (1998–present)
Year	Immigration	Emigration	Net migration
1998	8,801	4,255	4,200
1999	8,524	3,978	4,200
2000	12,764	6,298	3,960
2001	17,485	9,563	4,650
2002	6,940	1,474	5,466
2003	7,981	1,696	6,285
2004	9,003	1,913	7,090
2005	10,320	2,192	8,128
2006	13,077	2,778	10,299
2007	19,328	4,106	15,222
2008	21,060	4,474	16,586
2009	22,581	4,797	17,784
2010	20,206	4,293	15,913
2011	23,037	4,895	18,142
2012	16,138	19,986	-3,848
2013	13,666	20,679	-7,013
2014	13,003	16,020	-3,017
2015	15,364	15,733	-369
2016	18,590	16,445	2,145
2017	22,458	16,931	5,527
2018	25,740	17,562	8,178
2019	27,553	18,598	8,955
2020	22,850	14,200	8,650
2021	25,473	13,244	12,229
2022	37,558	21,118	16,440
2023	40,761	26,979	13,782

== Nationality group ==
Ethnic groups of Cyprus in 1973. Greeks Turks British military bases

According to the 2021 census, 74.6% of the population in the area under the control of the Republic of Cyprus were born in Cyprus, with 77.9% holding Cypriot citizenship.

Largest foreign nationalities (2021)
Citizenship	Inhabitants
(European Union) Greece	43,438
United Kingdom	18,918
(European Union) Romania	20,375
(European Union) Bulgaria	16,186
Philippines	8,104
Russia	12,250
Nepal	6,949
Sri Lanka	6,654
Syria	13,096
Ukraine	3,977
India	8,085
(European Union) Poland	2,379
Georgia	4,764
(European Union) Germany	2,167
Non-Cypriot EU citizenship total	93,540
Non-EU citizenship total	107,168

Note that citizenship and place of birth do not fully correlate. For example, 27,986 people living in areas under the control of the Republic of Cyprus were born in the United Kingdom, but only 18,918 are registered as having British citizenship.

The national identities of citizens in the area under the control of the Republic of Cyprus, according to the 2011 census are:

- 98.8%: Cypriot Greek
- 1%: other, including Maronite, Other Lebanese, Armenian, Turkish Cypriot
- 0.2%: unspecified

== Languages ==
Greek and Turkish are the official languages according to Article 3 of the Constitution of Cyprus. In Northern Cyprus, the official language is Turkish (Article 2 of the 1983 Constitution of Northern Cyprus).

=== 2021 census numbers ===
Official census numbers for government-controlled Cyprus:

Language	Speakers	%
Greek	733,732	79.46%
English	44,482	4.82%
Russian	21,642	2.34%
Arabic	19,663	2.13%
Romanian	18,691	2.02%
Bulgarian	14,678	1.59%
Indian languages	8,370	0.91%
Filipino	7,554	0.82%
Sinhala	6,060	0.66%
Ukrainian	4,090	0.44%
Georgian	3,445	0.37%
Nepali	3,421	0.37%
French	2,546	0.28%
Vietnamese	2,500	0.27%
German	2,281	0.25%
Chinese	2,179	0.24%
Polish	2,013	0.22%
Turkish	1,551	0.17%
Persian	1,166	0.13%
Armenian	1,067	0.12%
Hebrew	885	0.1%
Italian	846	0.09%
Latvian	733	0.08%
Slovak	703	0.08%
Belarusian	678	0.07%
Bengali	657	0.07%
Spanish	657	0.07%
Swedish	605	0.07%
Hungarian	559	0.06%
Urdu	492	0.05%
Serbo-Croatian	430	0.05%
Dutch	403	0.04%
Other languages	3,491	0.38%
Not stated	11,111	1.2%
Total	923,381	100.00%

== Religion ==
Religions of Cyprus (2012) (Cyprus government controlled areas)
Religions	percent
Orthodox Christian	89.1%
Roman Catholic	2.9%
Protestant/Anglican	2%
Islam	1.8%
Other (includes Maronite, Armenian Church, Hindu)	1.4%
Unknown	1.1%
Buddhist	1%
None/Atheist	0.6%

The Greek Cypriot community adheres to the Autocephalous Greek Orthodox Church of Cyprus and the Turkish Cypriot community adheres to Islam. The religious groups of Armenians, Maronites and Latins (about 9,000 people in total) opted, in accordance with the 1960 constitution, to belong to the Greek Cypriot community.

The 2011 census of the government-controlled area notes that 89.1% of the population follows Greek Orthodox Christianity, 2.9% are Roman Catholic, 2% are Protestants, 1.8% are Muslims and 1% are Buddhists; Maronite Catholics, Armenian Orthodox, Jewish, Jehovah's Witnesses and Baháʼís make up the remainder. Cyprus is also the home of 6,000 Jewish people who have a Synagogue in Larnaca.

== Education ==
Cyprus has a well-developed system of primary and secondary education. The majority of Cypriots earn their higher education at Greek, British, or American universities, while there are also sizeable emigrant communities in the United Kingdom and Australia. Private colleges and state-supported universities have been developed by both the Turkish and Greek communities.

== Demographic statistics ==
The following demographic statistics are from the CIA World Factbook, unless otherwise indicated.

The data in subsections Age structure through Divorce rate are for the area controlled by the Republic of Cyprus government only. The estimates are for 2007 from the Republic of Cyprus Statistical Abstract 2007 (pp. 63–88) unless indicated otherwise.

=== Population ageing ===
Cyprus is undergoing a demographic transition toward an older age structure. The proportion of individuals aged 65+ rose to 17.7% in 2023, surpassing the share of children under 15 (15.3%). This ageing trend has implications for the country’s labour supply, pension system, and health-care services.

=== Age structure ===
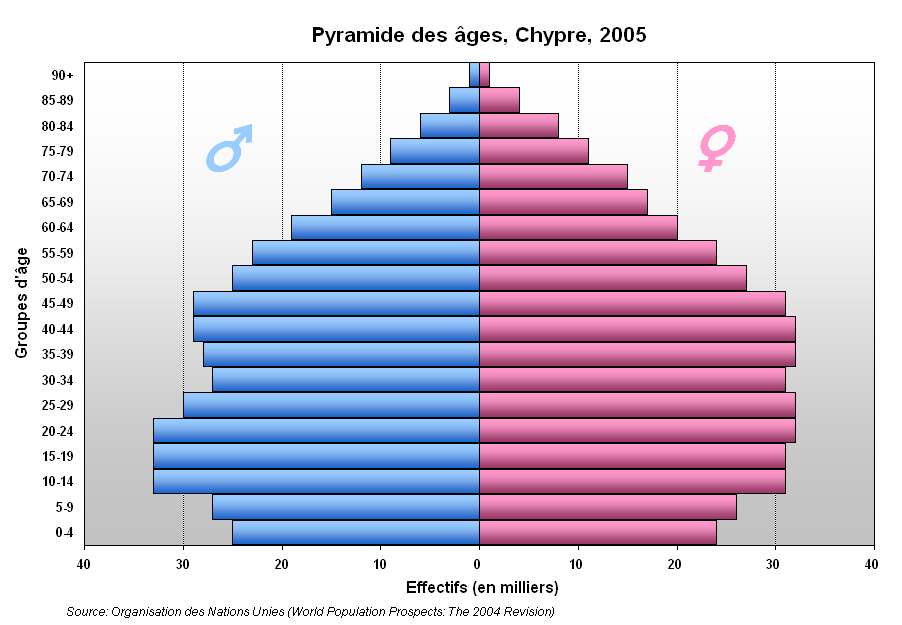
Age structure of the population of Cyprus

0–14 years: 17.47% or 137,900 ( 70,700 males/67,200 females)
15–64 years: 70.07% or 553,100 ( 274,300 males/278,800 females)
65 years and over: 12.46% or 98,300 ( 44,600 males/53,700 females)

=== Population growth rate ===
1.4%

=== Net migration rate ===
Total immigrants: 19,143
Total emigrants: 11,753
Net migration: +7,390
Net migration rate: 9.4 migrant(s)/1,000 population

=== Sex ratio ===
At birth: 1.086 male(s)/female
Under 15 years: 1.05 male(s)/female
15–64 years: 0.98 male(s)/female
65 years and over: 0.83 male(s)/female
Total population: 0.99 male(s)/female

=== Marriage rates ===
Estimates for 2023

Number of marriages:

Ecclesiastical marriages: 4,355
Civil marriages: 7,411
Civil marriages of Cyprus residents: 6,431
Total marriages: 11,766

Marriage rate:

Total marriages: 11.8/1,000 population

=== Divorce rates ===
Estimates for 2023
Total Divorces: 2,134
Divorce Rate: 2.23/1,000 population

=== Nationality ===
Noun: Cypriot(s)
Adjective: Cypriot

=== HIV/AIDS ===
Adult prevalence rate: 0.1% (2003 est.)
People living with HIV/AIDS: fewer than 1,000 (1999 est.); 518 cases reported between 1986 and 2006 (58% Cypriots, 42% foreigners/visitors);
Deaths: 85 reported between 1986 and 2006.

"The information presented here concerns only part of Cyprus, due to an absence of reliable information concerning the island as a whole".
