= Kisa Phone =

KISA is an Australian mobile virtual network operator founded in 2013. The company markets a KISA Phone it is a mobile phone suitable for the elderly; patients with physical disabilities or cognitive impairments; and parents wanting to track the locations of their young children.

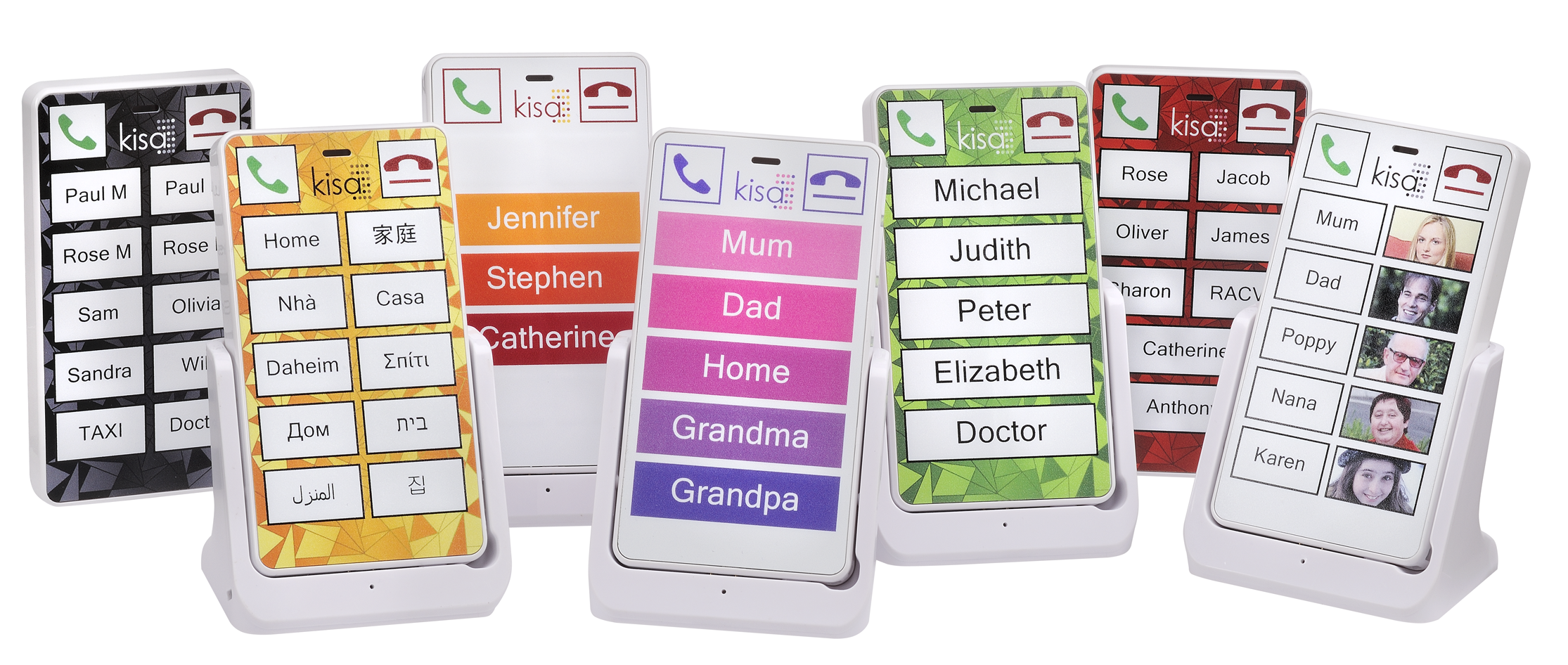
Kisa phones

The company markets a mobile phone suitable for the elderly; and people with physical disabilities or cognitive impairments; and parents of young children.

Approved as assistive technology for eligible participants in the National Disability Insurance Scheme, the phone is designed to operate without a screen and keypad; rather, it features large mechanical buttons on the front, a dedicated SOS button, and space for critical information of the phone user on the back. Designed in conjunction with Vision Australia and Guide Dogs Victoria, the phone can be manufactured in Braille.

The KISA Phone is recognised as a friendly phone for children with special needs, it's made to be accessible and affordable. It aims to give the disabled and vulnerable more independence with a GPS location service and a lanyard strap to prevent losses or fall damage.

KISA Devices can be compared to Amazon Echo Dot smart speaker with Alexa as a "great tech products to manage your health at home"

The original model was released in August 2014, followed by a second version in May 2016.
