= Kisa tribe =

Tribe in Kenya

The Kisa, also known as Abakisa or Abashisa, are one of the sixteen tribes of the Luhya nation of Kenya. They occupy the Kisa area within the Khwisero division of Butere-Mumias district. The Kisa are sandwiched between the Marama of Butere, the Idakho of Kakamega and the Nyore of Vihiga district.

== Geography ==
Kisa is located at Latitude 0.150000 and Longitude 34.666668. It is divided into East, West, North and South Kisa, with Khwisero as a major trading centre. Key border points of the location are Standi Kisa on the Kisumu - Kakamega road, and Khumpaka at Mwitseshe, close to Ekonjereo market on the Khwisero - Musoli road. Notable geographical features include the Misango Hills at Emulunya, which are the highest point of the area.

River Yala, which is known locally as Olukose, traverses the entire location.where mining is done alongside.and the same river act as a boundary between kisa east and North

== Society ==
Ebushibungo village is well known for its affluent inhabitants. Notable examples include Rev. Albert Sumbas and his family, who own Musamaria Mwema Buses. Another such resident is Barrack Omuluka Omwiwa Wa Abashibungo.

The majority of the residents of Kisa West Ward are Christian, affiliated to the Church of God East Africa.

The Kisa tribe love playing isukuti drums during various social activities, such as at disco matangas, funerals and weddings.

=== Language ===
The people of Kisa speak Olushisa. A few basic words in the Kisa language include:

- Kuka = Grandfather
- Kukhu = Grandmother
- Papa = Father
- Mama = Mother
- Mulembe = general greetings. Meaning peace
- Omulembe = peace/greeting.
- Ingokho = Chicken
- Imbusi = Goat .
- Obusuma =ugali .

== Infrastructure ==
Notable buildings include Mwihila Mission School and Hospital, and Khwisero Administrative Centre.
