= KISA (Cypriot organisation) =

Organization

The Movement for Equality, Support, Anti-Racism (Greek: Κίνηση για Ισότητα, Στήριξη, Αντιρατσισμό, abbr. ΚΙΣΑ – KISA), is a Cypriot Non-Governmental Organisation. The organisation has two main remits: campaigning against discrimination in all forms on the island, including racism and sex trafficking, including running the annual Action Week against Racism within the framework of the European Network Against Racism, and operating Support Centres which provide free legal and social services, guidance and advice to migrants, refugees and asylum seekers in Cyprus.

== History ==
It was founded in 1998 in response to changes in Cypriot society, which saw large waves of immigration from Eastern European and Third World countries.

KISA has frequently served to bring issues concerning third country migrants to national attention. Examples might include the suicide of a refugee in 2013 after his claim for asylum was mishandled, attacks on gay men and residents from other EU countries.

In June 2020, the organisation was fined 10 000 € for defamation over a 2010 report which called for the Cypriot government to withdraw the appointment of Christos Clerides to the Management Board of the European Union Agency for Fundamental Rights. The organisation had accused Clerides of inciting hate against Makarios Drousiotis, a journalist investigating far-right extremism in Cyprus.

=== Rainbow Festival Riot and aftermath ===
KISA organizes the annual "Rainbow Festival," the only festival celebrating multiculturalism and ethnic diversity in Cyprus. In November 2010, the festival was involved in a riot between anti-immigration protesters and festival attendees. Subsequently, the Executive Director of KISA, Doros Polycarpou, was arrested and charged with rioting, a police action that drew protests from human rights groups across the EU as well as significant media coverage. Polycarpou was acquitted after the judges found police witnesses not to be credible.

=== 2020 deregistration ===
In December 2020, the Cypriot government deregistered KISA as a charity and froze its bank accounts for missing a paperwork deadline. After the Administrative Court ruled against KISA's appeal of the decision, the organisation announced it intended to file a case to the Supreme Court, which succeeded in overturning the deregistration.

The deregistration attracted significant controversy. Dunja Mijatović, the Council of Europe Commissioner for Human Rights wrote a formal letter to the Cypriot government over the move, noting that KISA had filed the paperwork shortly after the deadline and calling the government's response disproportionate. Human Rights Watch stated that international human rights organisations depend on collaboration with local groups and that KISA "should not face deregistration for a technicality."
