= Solomon Islands Girl Guides Association =

- Country: Solomon Islands
- Founded: 1949
- Membership: 1173
- President: Jean Tafoa
- Chief Commissioner: Gladys Siale
- Affiliation: World Association of Girl Guides and Girl Scouts

The Solomon Islands Girl Guides Association is the national Guiding organisation in Solomon Islands. Founded in 1949, the girls-only organisation became an associate member of the World Association of Girl Guides and Girl Scouts in 1987. It has 1,173 members (as of 2011).

== History ==
The first Girl Guides group in the Solomon Islands was begun in 1949 by a missionary teacher in Santa Isabel, but the group disbanded when the teacher left. In 1957, a second group was begun with, and in 1958, it was registered with the UK Guide Association. The first meeting was held in Honiara in May 1958, with sixteen members; by 1962, they had expanded to three locations, and by 1968, to nine islands. Membership was about 4,000 in the 1960s.

The Association became an associate member of the World Association of Girl Guides and Girl Scouts in 1987. In 1998, it had 810 members, although membership was concentrated on the larger islands due to the difficulty of traveling to and communicating with the smaller ones.

From the 1990s to the year 2000, Guiding in Solomon Islands was inactive until an interim committee reestablished activity. In 2010, membership was still concentrated in Honiara, though the Association hoped to expand to other parts of the country. In 2011, there were 1,173 members.

== Activities ==
Guides and Scouts often help with relief work after cyclones and hurricanes. Marilyn Waring credited the Guides as being one factor that helped expand the social role of women starting in the 1950s. She said that Guiding provided girls with the opportunity to participate in activities that were considered "masculine" at the time, such as camping and flag-raising, and helped girls build self-esteem.

== See also ==
- Solomon Islands Scout Association
