= Zisa (goddess) =

German pagan goddess

Zisa or Cisa is purportedly a pagan goddess once worshipped in Augsburg. Some modern scholars consider the goddess to have been an innovation of the post-medieval period.

== Attestations ==
The earliest record of a goddess named Zisa or Cisa is in an eleventh-century manuscript, now in Vienna, titled Excerptum ex Gallia Historia (Excerpt from the History of Gaul). According to the Excerptum, the city of Augsburg was once known as Cisaris after this goddess, who saved the city from a Roman invasion on 28 September. On this day her feast was celebrated, and her name is preserved as the name of a hill, Cisunberc. A placename Cisenberg is attested around Augsburg in a charter from around 1300. The historical event described (the Roman assault) is universally rejected as not having any historical value.

Various later textual mentions of Zisa all seem to depend on the Excerptum, sometimes mixed with information on Slavic deities derived from William of Malmesbury. In the late fifteenth and in the sixteenth century, German humanists associated the images of various women around Augsburg with the goddess, including some on churches and some dug up in the city.

== Theories ==
Jacob Grimm proposed that Zisa might be the consort of the god Tyr (in Old High German, Ziu). Grimm also suggested a connection between Zisa and the "Isis" of the Suebi attested by Tacitus in his 1st century CE work Germania based on the similarity of their names. Grimm's connection of Zisa to Isis may have been influenced by similar considerations made by humanists such as Konrad Peutinger.

The existence of a goddess Zisa was controversial through the nineteenth and early twentieth centuries. In 1936, R. Kohl critically examined the evidence for the goddess's existence: he determined that none of the archaeological or pictorial depictions that were said to depict Zisa in fact depicted the goddess. Examining the Excerptum, Kohl argued that the name of the goddess seemed to have been derived as an explanation for the place name Cisenberg, after which the "old name" for Augsburg, Cisaris, was invented by the writer of the Excerptum from Cisae ara (altar of Cisa in Latin). Kohl argues that the name Cisenberg can be explained without the goddess; alternative explanations are that it means "mountain on which siskins [German Zeisige] nest" or "mountain in the form of a breast" (German Zitze). As all other information on Zisa appears to derive from the Excerptum in one way or another, Kohl concludes that the goddess never existed. Following Kohl, Rudolf Simek writes:

(Cisa, Zisa) is supposedly the name of a Germanic goddess who, according to a Latin historical text from the 11th century, was worshipped in Augsburg in heathen times. While Grimm made extensive speculations about the identity of this goddess, today the supposition of a goddess Cisa is rejected because the source text does not stand up to critical examination.
