= Solomon Islands Scout Association =

- Age range: 1928; 98 years ago
- Country: Solomon Islands
- Membership: 500
- Chief Scout: David Tiva Kapu
- Affiliation: WOSM

The Solomon Islands Scout Association (SISA), (formerly the Solomon Islands branch of The Scout Association (Solomons Pijin: Skaut Belong Solomone), founded in 1928, is a National Scout Organisation of the World Organization of the Scout Movement (WOSM). It was a branch of the United Kingdom Scout Association for historical reasons and because the number of Scouts in the Solomon Islands was relatively small. Moves to achieve official WOSM membership began as early as 2007, and this recognition was granted in June 2021. The Chief Scout role is traditionally held by the Governor General.

== Background ==
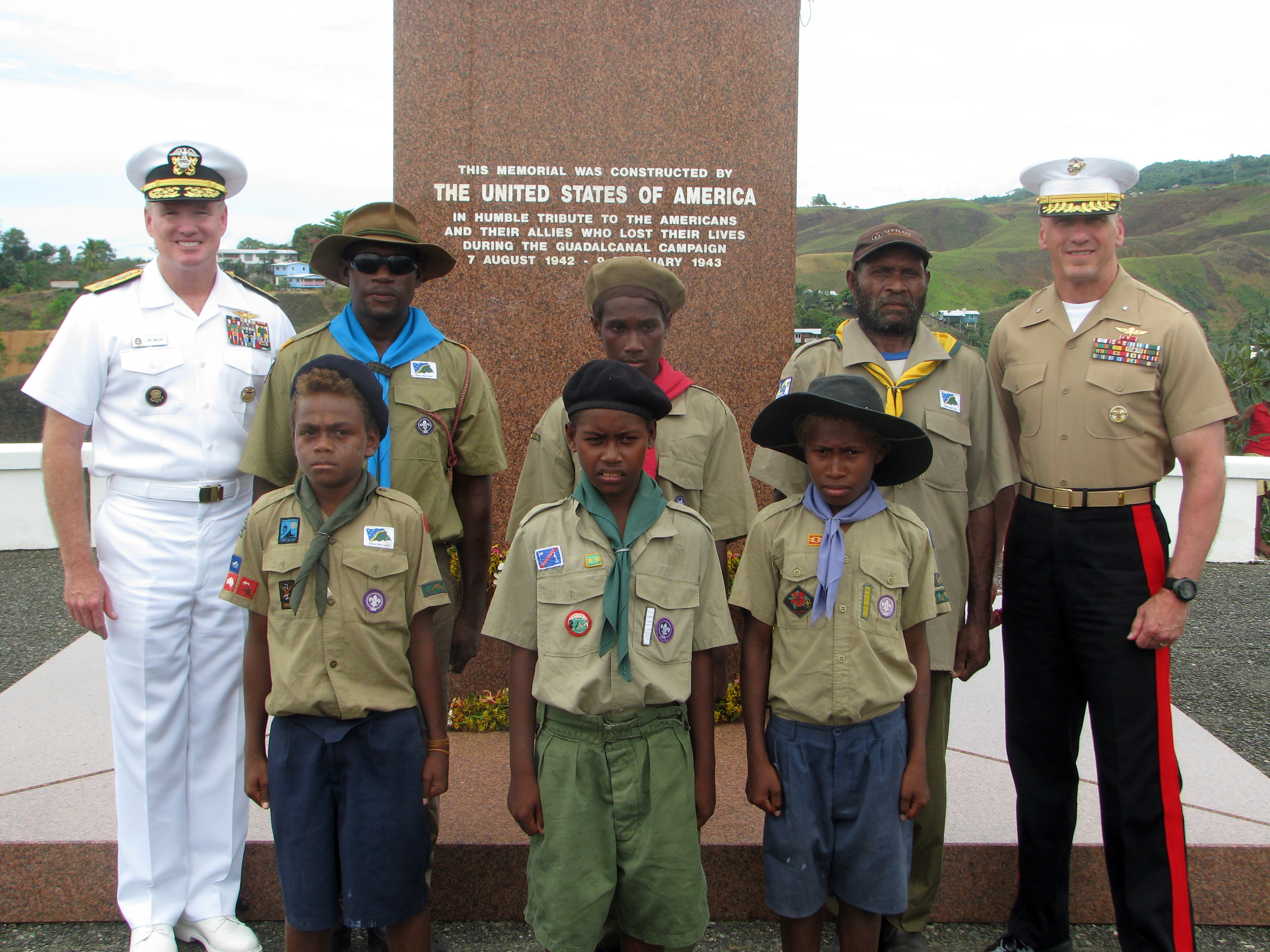
Solomon Islands' Scouts posing for a photo with Adm. Patrick M. Walsh and Marine Corps Brig. Gen. Richard Simcock

Scouts from the Solomon Islands participated in the 19th World Jamboree in Chile in 1998.

The membership badge of the Solomon Islands branch of The Scout Association features the national flag. The older variant shows a palm tree, a symbol in use since the Solomon Islands was a colonial branch of British Scouting.

== See also ==
- The Girl Guides Association of Solomon Islands
