= Battlestar Galactica: The Second Coming =

- Directed by: Richard Hatch; Jay Woelfel
- Written by: Richard Hatch; Sophie LaPorte
- Produced by: Johnnie J. Young; Sophie LaPorte; Richard Hatch (executive producer)
- Starring: Richard Hatch; John Colicos; Terry Carter; Jack Stauffer; George Murdock; Richard Lynch; Phil Brown; Mickalean McCormick; Ali Willingham; Szilvia Naray; Nicholas Walker; Jere Jon; Don Hughes; Athena Demos; Frank Ruotolo
- Cinematography: Dean Cundey; Scott Spears
- Edited by: Eric Chase
- Release date: 1999
- Running time: 30 min. (pilot film); 4 min. (trailer)
- Language: English

Battlestar Galactica: The Second Coming was a proposed 1999 science-fiction action film. It was a project to create a pilot film for a proposed new Battlestar Galactica television series that would pick up where the original 1978 series left off. All continuity related to Galactica 1980 would have been completely ignored.

== Development ==
Co-written, executive produced and co-directed by Richard Hatch who starred in the original series as Captain Apollo, the pilot film was conceived to convince Universal Studios, the owner of the Battlestar Galactica franchise rights, to greenlight a new project based on this concept. The pilot film was written by Hatch and his then girlfriend, writer Sophie LaPorte, directed by Hatch and Jay Woelfel and produced by Johnnie J. Young and Sophie LaPorte.

Richard Hatch was able to get many cast members from the original series including Richard Lynch (in place of Patrick Macnee as Count Iblis), John Colicos (Lord Baltar), and Terry Carter (Colonel Tigh, now President of the Quorum of Twelve) to appear in the film. Hatch himself also reprised his own role of Apollo (now Commander of the Fleet). The original character Starbuck was chosen not to be recast and instead, a new character was created as his daughter, a bold and brazen Viper pilot not unlike the female Starbuck character in the new series.

Filming on the project began in the summer of 1998 and lasted through late 1999. Some of the filming was done in conjunction with the Battlestar Galactica 20th Yahren Reunion which was held at the Los Angeles Hilton in September 1998.

The finished edit of Battlestar Galactica: The Second Coming had a running time of thirty minutes in length. A four-minute trailer was later assembled from this thirty-minute version and computer generated special effects were added. The rare thirty-minute version of the pilot film has never been shown publicly.

The partially complete Battlestar Galactica: The Second Coming trailer was first shown at DragonCon in Atlanta on July 3, 1999, and received rave reviews from fans. Once it was complete, Hatch traveled to a series of science fiction conventions to show the trailer and it proved to be very popular at these events.

Sound was recorded by Larry Engle.

Hatch never succeeded in getting Universal's attention, and a different project, the re-imagined Battlestar Galactica conceived by Ronald D. Moore, was ultimately pursued. Hatch continued to push for a revival/continuation of his own vision of the original series, writing original novels based on it.

There are no plans to release Battlestar Galactica: The Second Coming on DVD and/or Blu-ray.

== Competing developments ==
Hatch's proposed sequel was one of several iterations of Battlestar Galactica to be announced. A sequel series by Bryan Singer was also developed, and even went into pre-production in 2001. This version would have also been a direct continuation of the original series, taking place many years later when the colonial fleet had made a settlement in an asteroid field only to have the Cylons find them and pursue them across the galaxy again. However, after the 911 terrorist attacks in September 2001, the production was halted and then later cancelled.

Also concurrent with The Second Coming was Glen A. Larson's movie proposal. This would have revived BSG as a feature film, centering on the Battlestar Pegasus, set after its appearance in the TV show, and consistent with Galactica 1980.

The project that finally got the go ahead was the re-imagining of the original series by Ronald D. Moore, which was greenlit as a miniseries by the Sci Fi Channel and aired in 2003. Hatch joined the new series cast as the recurring character Tom Zarek.
