= The Living Legend =

- Battlestar Galactica episodes
- Commander Adama (Lorne Greene) and Commander Cain (Lloyd Bridges)
- Episode nos.: Season 1 Episodes 12 and 13
- Directed by: Vince Edwards
- Written by: Glen A. Larson
- Story by: Glen A. Larson and Ken Pettus
- Production codes: 50919 and 50920
- Original air dates: November 26, 1978 (Part 1); December 3, 1978 (Part 2)

Guest appearances
- Lloyd Bridges as Commander Cain; Rod Haase as Tolan; Junero Jennings as Pegasus bridge officer

Episode chronology
← Previous "The Young Lords"	Next → "Fire in Space"

"The Living Legend" is a two-part episode of the American science fiction television series Battlestar Galactica. Written by series creator Glen A. Larson and directed by Vince Edwards, the episodes were originally broadcast on ABC on November 26 and December 3, 1978.

"The Living Legend" introduced the character of Commander Cain (Lloyd Bridges) and the Battlestar Pegasus, both of which were revived in the reboot series episode "Pegasus" in 2005. It also introduced the recurring characters of Lieutenant Sheba (Anne Lockhart) and Bojay (Jack Stauffer), and included the final appearance of the recurring character of the Cylon Imperious Leader.

The episodes were later edited and released theatrically in 1979 under the title Mission Galactica: The Cylon Attack, which also included material from the episode "Fire in Space".

== Plot ==
The Battlestar Galactica encounters the Pegasus, a battlestar previously assumed to have been destroyed, which is under the command of Commander Cain. The two battlestars fight the Cylons.

== Production and broadcast ==
"The Living Legend" was directed by Vince Edwards and written by series creator Glen A. Larson, from a story by Larson and Ken Pettus.

The episodes introduced the character of Commander Cain (Lloyd Bridges) and the Battlestar Pegasus, both of which were revived in remake series episode "Pegasus" in 2005. They also introduced the recurring characters of Lieutenant Sheba (Anne Lockhart) and Bojay (Jack Stauffer), and included the final appearance of the recurring character of the Cylon Imperious Leader. Nigel Andrews said the narrative concerning Galactica's shortage of fuel, and the Cylons' possession of an abundance of it, was influenced by the 1970s energy crisis that was happening at the time.

Part one aired on ABC on November 26, 1978, and part two aired on December 3, 1978.

== Reception ==
John Kenneth Muir praised "The Living Legend", and Krystal Sim called the episodes "memorable".

== Novelization ==
The novelization Battlestar Galactica 6: The Living Legend was written by Glen A. Larson and Nicholas Yermakov, and was published by Berkeley Books in New York in 1982.

== Mission Galactica: The Cylon Attack ==
The episodes were later edited and released theatrically in 1979 under the title Mission Galactica: The Cylon Attack, which also included material from the episode "Fire in Space".

The reviews of this film were described as "not so good". This film has been described as "glossy", "flimsily constructed" and a "cosmic yawn". Wishart said the film was liable to "fuel the imagination".

The film was broadcast in Germany under the title Mission Galactica: Angriff der Zyclonen or Mission Galactica: Angriff der Zyklonen and shown in sensurround in cinemas there under the title Mission Galactica: Angriff der Zylonen. It was shown in France under the title Galactica: Les Cylons Attaquent.

Mission Galactica was released on VHS, Betamax and LaserDisc. The book Mission Galactica: The Cylon Attack was published by Grandreams in London in 1980.
