= Saga of a Star World =

- Battlestar Galactica (1978) episodes
- Theatrical poster
- Episode nos.: Season 1 Episodes 1–3
- Directed by: Richard A. Colla; Alan Levi (uncredited)
- Written by: Glen A. Larson
- Original air dates: September 17, 1978; (edited theatrical version released in cinemas July 8, 1978 (Canada) & May 18, 1979 (United States))

Guest appearances
- Lew Ayres as President Adar; Wilfrid Hyde-White as Sire Anton; Ray Milland as Sire Uri; Jane Seymour as Serina; Rick Springfield as Zac

Episode chronology
| ← Previous — | Next → "Lost Planet of the Gods" |

"Saga of a Star World" (aka “Battlestar Galactica”) is the pilot for the American science fiction television series Battlestar Galactica which was produced in 1978 by Glen A. Larson. A re-edit of the episode was released theatrically as Battlestar Galactica in Canada before the television series aired in the United States, in order to help recoup its high production costs. Later, the standalone film edit was also released in the United States and internationally.

== Synopsis ==
Battlestar Galactica is set in a distant star system, in an age described as "the seventh millennium of time". Twelve colonies of humans, living on different worlds, have been fighting a 1,000 year war against the robotic race of Cylons, who seek to exterminate all of humanity. The Cylons have unexpectedly sued for peace, through the diplomatic agency of a human, Lord Baltar. The human leaders, called the Council of the Twelve (with one representative from each colony), and the commanders of their military fleet are all too pleased by the Cylon offer of peace, which ends so many years of warfare. The powerful "Battlestars" are assembled for armistice talks with Humanity's age-old robotic enemy. But it's a deception: the Cylons have no intention of making peace, and Baltar has betrayed humanity for the promise that his colony would be spared from extermination (a promise that goes unfulfilled).

Only Commander Adama, of the battlestar Galactica, suspects that the Cylons are planning a trap, and orders a recon patrol, consisting of his two best pilots: his eldest son, Captain Apollo, commander of the Galactica's strike wing, and Lieutenant Starbuck, the Galactica's best fighter pilot and Apollo's best friend. Adama's younger son, Zac, convinces Starbuck to let him go in his place. The patrol discovers a vast Cylon armada waiting in ambush behind a moon named Cimtar, but the Cylons jam their communications. Cylon fighters pursue the two Vipers, and Zac's fighter is hit. This forces Apollo to leave him behind, so that the fleet can be warned. Zac's Viper is destroyed by the Cylons just before he reaches the fleet.

Baltar manipulates President Adar into prohibiting the launch of fighters as the Cylons close in on the fleet, suggesting with a smile that the oncoming "wall" of Cylon fighters are a "welcoming committee." Frustrated, Adama orders the Galactica's Viper squadrons be placed on full alert, using a "battlestations drill" as a pretense to ready its fighters. As the Cylons attack, the Galactica is able to launch its fighters first, while the other battlestars are caught off-guard. The Atlantia, with President Adar aboard, is destroyed, as are apparently the other battlestars; Galactica alone survives the Cylon assault. Apollo informs Adama that the Cylons were accompanied by refueling tankers, and Adama realizes that this would allow the fighters to operate far from their base ships (known as "basestars"), which must be operating somewhere else. He orders the Galactica to withdraw and protect the planet Caprica, Adama's homeworld, but they are too late, as the Cylon fleet has launched simultaneous massive assaults on all the Colonies at the very same time the attack on the battlestars has commenced. The Cylon Imperious Leader, determined to destroy the human race, orders Baltar's execution after his usefulness is over, but he is spared at the last moment in order to help the Cylons hunt down the human fleet.

With the Colonies in ruins, Adama collects as many survivors as possible, and orders every intact civilian ship to take survivors and follow the Galactica. They hope that the Galactica can protect this ragtag fleet long enough to find the legendary thirteenth human colony. It is called Earth, but the location of this lost colony is known only to the last lord of Kobol, the planet which was the original home of Man, but which was abandoned thousands of years earlier, when the Thirteen Tribes migrated to the stars. Helping Adama in the quest for Earth are Apollo, Starbuck, Lieutenant Boomer, another fighter pilot, and Colonel Tigh, Adama's second-in-command.

The Galactica and the fugitive fleet escape the Cylons by crossing the Nova of Madagon, a massive, extremely hot starfield, which the Cylons have mined, and find brief respite on the resort planet of Carillon, where they hope to find food and fuel for their journey. As much of the fleet's food supplies were contaminated by pluton bombs during the Cylon attack, the fleet is in desperate straits, and must find a food source soon or face starvation.

It quickly becomes apparent that there is more to Carillon than meets the eye. The fact that Carillon has more than enough food and fuel for the fleet's needs makes Adama wary. It is also apparently the largest tylium (fighter fuel) mining facility in that part of the galaxy, as well as a popular gamblers' den, but nobody has ever heard of the place. Adama discovers that Baltar was responsible for performing the initial Carillon survey, and reported that tylium was too minimal for mining, and he immediately smells a Cylon trap.

Sire Uri, Adama's self-serving nemesis on the new Council of the Twelve, uses the opportunity the planet presents for the morale of the fugitives to move against Adama, whose strict but selflessly benign intentions hinder his own ambitions. The Council of the Twelve, led by Uri to believe the Cylons have been left far behind, propose that the humans pause to celebrate their escape and dismantle their military and weapons to prove to the Cylons that humans are no longer a threat to them. The Council arranges a banquet on Carillon, and orders all fighter pilots to attend. Adama suspects that this might be a golden opportunity for the Cylons to launch an attack on their fleet, and orders Colonel Tigh to hold back their pilots from attending the party while outfitting noncombat personnel with fighter uniforms.

On Carillon, Apollo and Starbuck discover something is amiss when they see strangers walking around clad in the uniforms of their squadron, and after some investigation they discover the truth behind the planet's prosperity. The natives of Carillon, the insectoid Ovions, have set up the gambling resort to lure humans to them to serve as living food for their hatching larvae in their underground chambers. They are also secretly in league with the Cylons and mine the tylium solely for their purposes in exchange for their freedom; they are cooperating in the Cylons' efforts to eradicate the human fugitives. During a subsequent fight with Cylon Centurions, the laser fire from both parties sets the tylium mines on fire, threatening to destroy the planet.

Adama's ruse works; the Cylons, believing that all of the pilots are at the banquet, launch a fighter attack against the Galactica, but Adama is ready to spring his trap. Once the Cylon fighter contingent is fully engaged with the Galactica, Adama recalls his Vipers from the surface of Carillon, taking the enemy by surprise. Estimating that the Cylon fighters could not have come so far without a basestar, Apollo and Starbuck disengage from the battle and find a Cylon basestar hidden on the far side of Carillon. In defiance of Commander Adama's recall order, they attempt to destroy it, in order to enable the refugee fleet to elude pursuit, and use fake radio chatter to fool the basestar into thinking it is under attack by multiple Viper squadrons. The basestar descends into Carillon's atmosphere to avoid detection, and is destroyed when the planet erupts in a massive tylium explosion. Despite their victory, the humans realize their enemies will still be pursuing them, and they set out to Earth, their last hope for survival.

== Production ==
The pilot cost $8 million, one of the most expensive made-for-television movies at the time. The theatrical version made use of Universal's Sensurround process .

== Release ==
Although produced for television, originally as part of a planned series of telemovies and eventually as a television series, Universal Studios decided to release a re-edited version theatrically in order to recoup some of the high production costs with producers believing the series "could be a fine shot at a corner of the Star Wars market."

On July 8, 1978, two months before its U.S. television debut, the film was released in Canada on 75 screens. The film had its US premiere on September 11, 1978, at the Philadelphia International Film Festival and Exhibition.

The television version was first broadcast in the United States on September 17, 1978. This original three-hour broadcast was in three U.S. time zones interrupted for thirty minutes to televise the signing of the Camp David Peace Accords between Israel's Menachem Begin and Egypt's Anwar Sadat, overseen by President Jimmy Carter. Following the coverage, ABC resumed the broadcast, right where it was interrupted. In later years, this version has often been separated into three episodes, each an hour long, for syndication.

In October, the film was shown overseas, including Australia and some countries in Europe and Latin America. While the series was still on air, the film was shown in theaters in San Antonio, Texas; Memphis, Tennessee; and Phoenix, Arizona on November 17, 1978. On April 15, 1979, it was released theatrically in the UK and Ireland. On May 18, 1979, following the broadcast of the final episode of the regular series, the theatrical version was released in 400 U.S. theaters.

In 1980, the pilot was edited again and syndicated as part of a series of reedited Battlestar Galactica telemovies.

Later episodes of the regular Battlestar Galactica series were also re-edited and released in cinemas internationally.

=== Differences between versions ===
Although there are many minor differences between the broadcast pilot and the cinema release, the most notable is the fact that, in the film version, Baltar is executed by the Cylons, whereas, in the television version, he is held for public execution before later being shown mercy by the Cylons, and going on to be a major character on the television series. The made for TV version included a scene of Starbuck & Athena in her quarters, which more significantly established their relationship early in the story. The Cylons in the theater release versions were living creatures in armor suits, not robots (rumor has it the censors allowed them to blow up more Cylon ships on TV if they were robots). There were more aliens in the casino on the planet Carillon in the theater version (the motivation to replace some of the aliens with humans might have been to make it less like the cantina scene in Star Wars). In the theater version there is significant dramatic tension when the audience realizes that all the pilots have been invited to a party on the planet Carillon, and the Cylons are about to attack the fighter pilotless fleet. In a surprise ending we find out that non-pilots have been dressed as pilots, and most of the real pilots are on the Galactica prepped for a counterattack. In the TV version they destroy this dramatic tension by giving away the surprise ending ahead of time with a conversation between Commander Adama and Colonel Tigh, and a scene of Tigh stealing uniforms from pilots' lockers. Another difference was related to TV censorship. In the TV version Starbuck and Cassiopia are sitting beside each other fully clothed in the launch tube, not nude and having sex as they were in the theater version, when Athena sees them on the monitor. (In the 35th Anniversary Blu-ray of the theatrical release, they are fully clothed.)

== Reception ==
=== Box office ===
The theatrical release was a success following an aggressive marketing campaign from Universal and the film grossed $471,917 in its first 3 days on release in Canada. The film grossed $41.8 million internationally.

=== Critical reception ===
The Hollywood Reporter referred to it as a "poor man's version of Star Wars" and Janet Maslin in The New York Times claimed that the filmmakers had "worked so carefully and expensively aping Star Wars that the humor has been lost, and so has the sense of fun."

=== Lawsuit ===
In June 1978, 20th Century Fox sued Universal Studios (producers of Battlestar Galactica) for plagiarism, copyright infringement, unfair competition, and Lanham Act claims, claiming it had stolen 34 distinct ideas from Star Wars. Universal promptly countersued, claiming Star Wars had stolen ideas from their 1972 film Silent Running, notably the robot "drones", and the Buck Rogers serials of the 1930s. 20th Century Fox's copyright claims were initially dismissed by the trial court in 1980, then the United States Court of Appeals for the Ninth Circuit remanded the case for trial in 1983. It was later "resolved without trial".

== Home media ==
=== DVD ===
Both the theatrical version and the television version have been released on DVD. The television version was released on the season 1 DVD set, and as part of "The Complete Epic Series" boxset containing all episodes of the series. The theatrical version was released in 1999 and then again in 2003 as a "flipper" disc with a preview for the then-current Battlestar Galactica revival and a Cylon DVD game. These releases present the theatrical version in 1.85:1 "matted" (non-anamorphic) widescreen, with the "Sensurround" track in Dolby Digital 1.1 Mono.

In 2013, Koch Media released this version in a three-film DVD set with Mission Galactica: The Cylon Attack and Conquest of the Earth. This DVD release uses HD masters supplied by Universal and all films are presented in 1.37:1 full frame as they were shot in, as opposed to the "matted" widescreen 1.85:1 ratio seen theatrically.

=== Blu-ray ===
Koch Media released the entire series in Germany on a Blu-ray set in January 2014. This set contains all the episodes of the series (including Galactica 1980), using the masters Universal used for their DVD releases, in 1080p with English 5.1 Surround and German mono. This set only contains the full-length TV versions of "Saga of a Star World" and the other episodes used to make the films Mission Galactica: The Cylon Attack (from "The Living Legend" and "Fire in Space"), and Conquest of the Earth (from "Galactica Discovers Earth" and "The Night the Cylons Landed"). However, the Koch set does contain the original theatrical trailers for all three films including the Super 8mm versions, along with other extras and fan convention material exclusive to that release. In May 2015, Universal released the complete series on Blu-ray in enhanced widescreen and 4:3 versions. The Universal Blu-ray sets carry over most of the extras from the previous "Complete Epic Series" DVD set with a few new ones included.

In February 2013, Universal Home Entertainment released the theatrical version on Blu-ray in North America with a new, remastered HD transfer in widescreen 1080p, the "Sensurround" track in DTS-MA 1.1 Mono, and a preview for Battlestar Galactica: Blood & Chrome. In October 2015, Koch Media released their own Blu-ray of the theatrical version using Universal's HD transfer in widescreen and unmatted 4:3 full frame formats. Extras include the German trailer and vintage German opening credits from a 16mm print.

== Other media ==
- A photonovel of the film was released in 1979, and is considered a highly prized collector's item. While much of this demand was due to each image on each page being taken directly from the actual 35mm film cells, compounding the value was the scarcity of intact copies; the glossy paper used for the print stock did not adhere well to the spine glue, and after several reads the binding tended to fall apart. This was further compounded as the glue became brittle with age.
- Stu Phillips' soundtrack to the pilot, as performed by the Los Angeles Philharmonic has been released on various occasions in the past, including a re-recorded LP, released in 1978 by MCA Records around the time of the film's TV debut. This was followed by a dedicated CD in the boxset entitled The Stu Phillips Anthology – Battlestar Galactica containing the original film tracks for the first time. In 1999, it was also re-recorded by the Royal Scottish National Orchestra, conducted by Phillips himself, and issued on CD. It was issued again in February 2011, by Intrada Records featuring the complete score as recorded for the film by the Los Angeles Philharmonic.
- A paperback novelization of the film was published in 1978. Like the Canadian theater version of the movie, the novelization featured living rather than robotic Cylons.
- The story was adapted into comic book form by Marvel Comics, first in a magazine format, then later in both tabloid format and as a trade paperback.
- An audio drama version was created by editing the film's mono sound and adding narration voiced by Lorne Greene and released on MCA Records in 1979 under the title "The Saga of Battlestar Galactica", Catalog #3078. The vinyl version features a gatefold sleeve with liner notes. It runs approx. 50 minutes.

== Re-imaginings ==
=== 2003 television version ===
- The plot of Part I formed the primary plot of the reimagined Battlestar Galactica miniseries, in which the Twelve Colonies are destroyed, and the survivors set out for Earth.
- The reimagined series episode "The Passage" is loosely based on the plot of Part II, in which the fleet must navigate through a radiation belt.

=== Cancelled Battlestar Galactica film ===
A planned but ultimately cancelled. planned Battlestar Galactica feature film from Director Bryan Singer would have been based on Saga of a Star World.
