= Pegasus (Battlestar Galactica) =

- Battlestar Galactica episode
- Admiral Helena Cain (Michelle Forbes) and Commander William Adama (Edward James Olmos) meet for the first time.
- Episode no.: Season 2 Episode 10
- Directed by: Michael Rymer
- Written by: Anne Cofell Saunders
- Original air date: September 23, 2005

Guest appearances
- Michelle Forbes as Admiral Helena Cain; Graham Beckel as Colonel Jack Fisk; John Pyper-Ferguson as Captain Cole "Stinger" Taylor; Sebastian Spence as Narcho; Leah Cairns as Racetrack; Fulvio Cecere as Lieutenant Thorne; Mike Dopud as Gage; Derek Delost as Vireem; Vincent Gale as Chief Peter Laird; Peter-John Prinsloo as Lt. Mei "Freaker" Firelli (extended version)

Episode chronology
← Previous "Flight of the Phoenix"	Next → "Resurrection Ship"
- Battlestar Galactica season 2

"Pegasus" is the tenth episode of the second season of the reimagined Battlestar Galactica television series. It aired originally on the Sci Fi Channel on September 23, 2005. Following "Pegasus", the series went on hiatus until January 2006.

In the episode, the human fleet encounters the Battlestar Pegasus, commanded by Admiral Helena Cain. She assumes command of the fleet. Gaius Baltar discovers that Pegasus crew members have been raping and torturing a Cylon prisoner. Cain sentences Helo and Chief Galen Tyrol to death after they accidentally kill a Pegasus officer who was preparing to rape Sharon. In response, Commander William Adama orders Vipers to escort Marines to Pegasus. Cain orders her own Vipers to intercept as the episode ends.

"Pegasus" was nominated for the 2006 Hugo Award for Best Dramatic Presentation, Short Form. It received critical acclaim.

== Plot ==
A large unknown ship appears on Galactica's DRADIS. After a tense moment, the ship is identified as the Battlestar Pegasus, a Colonial vessel previously believed destroyed in the Cylon attack on the Colonies. Cain boards Galactica with an armed escort and welcomes the crew "back to the Colonial Fleet." Cain relates to Adama and President Laura Roslin how she ordered a risky maneuver to escape the initial Cylon attack on the Twelve Colonies. Adama recognizes Cain as his superior officer, but Cain promises not to interfere with Galactica's internal affairs.

Cain declines to resupply the fleet's civilian ships and integrates the battlestars' crews, transferring Apollo and Starbuck to Pegasus over Commander Adama's objections. Cain's executive officer, Colonel Jack Fisk, tells Colonel Saul Tigh how Cain shot his predecessor for refusing an order. Fisk claims his story is a joke, but Tigh believes it is true and relates the story to Adama. Adama reiterates his willingness to follow Cain, to both Roslin and Tigh, and insists that Apollo and Starbuck obey their transfer orders.

Baltar visits Gina, a Number Six copy held prisoner aboard Pegasus. He and Head Six are horrified to discover that the Pegasus crew has systematically tortured and raped Gina. Baltar attempts to establish a rapport with Gina by providing food and confessing to his involvement with another Six copy on Caprica.

Helo and Tyrol rescue Sharon from imminent rape by a Pegasus interrogator but accidentally kill the interrogator in the process. Cain denies Adama's request that Helo and Tyrol be given a jury court-martial and sentences them both to death for murder and treason. Adama demands that Cain return them to Galactica and orders Vipers to escort a Marine assault team to Pegasus. Cain refuses and sends the Pegasus Vipers to intercept Galactica's.

== Extended version ==
Director Michael Rymer's cut of "Pegasus" was about 20 minutes too long for broadcast in an hour-long time slot. Executive producers David Eick and Ronald D. Moore advocated for "Pegasus" to be shown as a 90-minute special episode. The Sci Fi Network refused, so Eick and Moore cut it down to about 44 minutes. However, a 59-minute "extended version" of "Pegasus" is included with the Region 1 DVD release of the second half of the second season, styled "Season 2.5".

Notable plot differences with the broadcast version are listed below, in the order in which they appear in the episode.

- Starbuck argues unsuccessfully to Adama and Roslin that Galactica should return to Caprica to rescue survivors. She promised to rescue Sam Anders from Caprica in a previous episode, "The Farm".
- Cain and Baltar discuss the efficacy of physical coercion in interrogation during a visit to Sharon's cell.
- A conversation between Cain and Adama makes clear that Pegasus is much larger, more advanced, and more powerful than Galactica.
- Helo and Tyrol interrupt rather than prevent Sharon's rape.

Several shots without dialogue are inserted or lengthened, as well.

== Analysis ==
Jacob Clifton of Television Without Pity, Jason Davis of Mania, and Jen Segrest of TV Squad each compare the Galactica crew to the Pegasus crew. Because they have chosen to guard a vast civilian fleet, the Galactica has lost some discipline but maintained its humanity. The Pegasus crew has lost some of its humanity, as demonstrated by their brutal treatment of their Cylon prisoner. Clifton compares the Pegasus crew to the barbaric Reavers from the television series Firefly.

The Cylon Gina (Tricia Helfer) in shackles. The use of torture depicted in "Pegasus" has been the subject of analysis.

John Ip considers the depiction of torture in "Pegasus". He contrasts the Galactica crew's relatively generous treatment of Sharon with the Pegasus crew's treatment of Gina and Starbuck's treatment of Leoben Conoy in the first-season episode "Flesh and Bone". Noting that Sharon has provided the humans with useful intelligence, where Gina and Leoben have not, Ip characterizes "Pegasus" as "an allegorical critique of the [George W.] Bush Administration's treatment of terrorist detainees." Ip also sees parallels between the way the Pegasus crew talks about the captive Cylons as subhuman and Bush administration rhetoric surrounding such detainees. Roz Kaveney considers the humans' simultaneous insistence on the inhumanity of the Cylons and use of torture and rape against them "paradoxical". Overall, Ip contrasts what he considers a "skeptical" portrayal of the effectiveness of torture as an interrogation method in "Pegasus" with what he views as a more sympathetic treatment in the television series 24. Tung Yin also invokes 24, calling the Pegasus interrogator a more realistic "professional torturer" than Jack Bauer, the 24 protagonist.

Clifton notes that the Pegasus crew who celebrate raping Gina and look forward to raping Sharon are all men, and the female Galactica crew react negatively. He questions whether Cally is truly concerned about Sharon, recalling Cally's sexual assault in the first-season episode "Bastille Day". Clifton further suggests a homoerotic element to the men's enthusiasm and compares the situation to a frat party.

Amanda Keith of Los Angeles Newspaper Group's Film Cannon considers Cain's verdict against Helo and Tyrol. Keith notes Cain is in the right legally: Helo and Tyrol broke their oaths as members of the Colonial Fleet. However, Keith argues that Cain has a moral responsibility to spare them to preserve what human life still remains. Clifton argues that Cain's decision is correct and that the audience's prejudices in favor of the two men do not apply to her character because she does not know them.

Davis compares Adama's defiance of Cain to Apollo's mutiny in "Kobol's Last Gleaming".

Eick notes a practice of actor Edward James Olmos (Adama) going back to his role in Miami Vice: his character avoids eye contact with other characters he doesn't respect. Eick says the amount Adama looks at Cain in "Pegasus" indicates that he respects her.

According to Clifton, the ways in which Apollo and Starbuck protest their transfer orders reflect their characters: Apollo points out the detrimental effects of shuffling personnel ahead of an operation, and Starbuck insults Cain and the Pegasus CAG.

== Production ==
In January 2005, Moore wrote that the writers had been discussing "for a couple of years" a storyline around a battlestar Pegasus inspired by the original Battlestar Galactica. In his September 2005 podcast commentary on the episode, Moore said he had been thinking about the episode "literally since I agreed to do the project." However, he waited until the middle of the second season so the series would be further developed when Pegasus and Cain appear. In particular, he wanted the audience to have built some loyalty for the Galactica characters to complicate their reaction to Cain's (correct, in Moore's view) assessment that Galactica runs problematically. Moore abandoned several elements of the original-series episode involving Cain, "The Living Legend"; the main similarities in his view are Cain appearing suddenly in the Pegasus and being "more of a hardass character than Commander Adama." Moore considers the key differences to be Cain's gender and her authority over Adama.

"Pegasus" was the first episode of Battlestar Galactica written by Anne Cofell Saunders, whom Eick and Moore hired based on her work writing an episode for the fourth season of 24.

Several actresses were considered for the role of Cain. Moore had worked with Forbes previously when she played Ro Laren on Star Trek: The Next Generation. Other members of the production team knew her from her work in film. Moore was excited by what he described as the "challenge" of writing Cain as a younger character and was ultimately very pleased by the choice to cast Forbes. According to Eick, Forbes was reluctant at first to accept the part because she felt her role as Ro had resulted in her being typecast as a science fiction actress.

Eick and Moore advocated for Sharon's rape as shown in the extended version to be included in the broadcast version. According to Eick and Moore, the Sci Fi Network did not permit it, citing substantial differences between the script and what was filmed and the belief that the material would be too controversial for television.

Gina's name is not mentioned within the episode. The name is a reference to fans of the original series who called the re-imagined series GINO for "Galactica in Name Only".

Cain's practice of forcing her staff to stand at meetings was inspired by a similar practice of John Bolton Moore read about in a newspaper.

The Pegasus set is distinct from the Galactica set, but it was built on the same soundstage. Financial and physical constraints meant they had to reuse pieces; all the scenes in the episode in corridors on Pegasus were filmed in the same corridor lit differently and shot at different angles to suggest different parts of the ship. Moore compares the difference between Galactica and Pegasus to the difference between a historical aircraft carrier like the USS Hornet and a modern aircraft carrier.

"Pegasus" features more shots with harsh lighting and with cameras on dollies rather than handheld than in prior episodes. According to Eick, Rymer thought such changes would make "Pegasus" less in the style of a documentary and more appropriate to the larger scale of the narrative. Eick also suggests Rymer was bored with the series's style and wanted to try new approaches.

Eick and Moore characterized composer Bear McCreary's score for the teaser as lulling the audience into a state of comfort.

== Reception ==
Critics praised Michelle Forbes's performance as Admiral Cain.

"Pegasus" was nominated for the 2006 Hugo Award for Best Dramatic Presentation, Short Form. It lost to the Doctor Who episodes "The Empty Child" and "The Doctor Dances". Actress Tricia Helfer, who played Six, received the 2006 Leo Award for "Best Lead Performance by a Female in a Dramatic Series" for her performance in the episode.

Critical reception of "Pegasus" was favorable. Maureen Ryan of the Chicago Tribune wrote, "Tricia Helfer and Grace Park [Sharon] gave outstanding performances". Clifton gave "Pegasus" an A, praising the performances of Mary McDonnell (Roslin), Helfer, and especially Forbes and calling the episode as a whole "really, really well done, and really, really hard to watch." Segrest also said it was hard to watch but nonetheless reviewed the episode favorably, commending the performances of James Callis (Baltar) and Helfer as Gina. Davis gave "Pegasus" an A+, praising Forbes, Helfer, McDonnell, and Olmos and calling the episode's musical score "without equal". Keith called "Pegasus" "the darkest the show has gone" but said both the aired and extended versions were "A+ episodes." Simon Brew of Den of Geek called the episode "flat-out outstanding."

Michael Hickerson of Slice of SciFi ranked "Pegasus" as the eighth best episode of the re-imagined Battlestar Galactica, calling it "compelling and... fascinating". John Kubicek of BuddyTV ranked it ninth best, saying the ending "could be one of TV's greatest cliffhangers." Kelly Woo of TV Squad also ranked it ninth best. Alan Sepinwall listed it among his favorite episodes of the series, calling the episode "a gut-wrencher from start to finish" and Forbes "perfect". Jackson Alpern of Maxim ranked the first scene of confusion over whether Pegasus is a Cylon ship the ninth best moment in the series. Eric Goldman of IGN ranked "Admiral Cain's reign" in "Pegasus" and the following (two-part) episode, "Resurrection Ship", second on his list of the series's top "storylines and moments", praising Forbes's performance and calling the three episodes "riveting".

In separate interviews, Olmos, McDonnell, and actor Aaron Douglas (Tyrol) were asked to respond to criticism of the graphic nature of the rape scene. Olmos said of people who were upset, "They should be warned right now: please turn off your television sets and do not watch this show because it’s only going to provide more insight into the complexities of what happens to human beings." McDonnell said that the scene was helpful for promoting dialogue and contrasted it with how violence against women is portrayed elsewhere in media. Douglas insisted that the scene was not sensationalistic but rather was an attempt to honestly portray the human condition.

== Connection to other series elements ==
In "Resurrection Ship", it is revealed that Pegasus raided several civilian ships for supplies and abandoned them to the Cylons. Some members of the Pegasus crew, including the deck chief, were conscripted from these ships. Also in "Resurrection Ship", two of the Pegasus crew members who brag in "Pegasus" about raping Gina subject the captive Helo and Tyrol to a blanket party.

Some of Battlestar Pegasus's backstory is presented in the television movie Battlestar Galactica: Razor:

- Cain and Gina were lovers until the Cylon attack on the Twelve Colonies.
- Cain executed her previous executive officer exactly as Fisk described.
- The raids on the civilian ships are shown.
