= Flight of the Phoenix (Battlestar Galactica) =

- Battlestar Galactica episode
- Episode no.: Season 2 Episode 9
- Directed by: Michael Nankin
- Written by: David Weddle; Bradley Thompson
- Original air date: September 16, 2005

Guest appearances
- Donnelly Rhodes as Doctor Cottle; Bodie Olmos as Hot Dog; Leah Cairns as Racetrack; Jennifer Halley as Seelix; Christian Tessier as Tucker "Duck" Clellan; Dominic Zamprogna as Jammer; Don Thompson as Anthony Figurski

Episode chronology
| ← Previous "Final Cut" | Next → "Pegasus" |
- Battlestar Galactica season 2

"Flight of the Phoenix" is the ninth episode of the second season of the reimagined Battlestar Galactica television series. It aired originally on the Sci Fi Channel on September 16, 2005.

In the episode, the Number Eight copy being held on Galactica (Sharon) helps delete a computer virus created by the Cylons, and Chief Galen Tyrol builds a stealth fighter from spare parts.

Critics reviewed "Flight of the Phoenix" favorably.

== Plot ==
In "Valley of Darkness," a computer virus created by the Cylons shut down Galactica's power, but Lieutenant Felix Gaeta seemingly purged it. In "The Farm," Commander William Adama sentenced Specialist Cally to 30 days in Galactica's brig for killing the Number Eight copy (Boomer) who shot Adama.

Gaeta determines that the Cylon virus is still active, is responsible for a series of malfunctions aboard Galactica, and threatens to take full control of the ship. Adama enlists Sharon's help. She confirms Gaeta's diagnosis and warns that a Cylon attack is imminent. Hundreds of Cylon Raiders and Heavy Raiders appear and hold formation, preparing to activate the virus. Forced to trust Sharon, Adama allows her to interface directly with Galactica's systems by inserting a fiber optic cable into her hand. Sharon helps delete the virus and broadcasts a virus of her own to the Cylon ships, rendering them helpless and easy pickings for the Vipers. Sharon is summarily returned to her cell.

Helo is ostracized by his crewmates for his relationship with Sharon. Haunted by memories of Boomer, Tyrol does not join the celebration of Cally's release. Tyrol and Helo argue about their respective relationships with Number Eight; the argument comes to blows. Inspired by Lee "Apollo" Adama's comment that "no one's expecting any miracles," Tyrol begins to build a new starfighter from salvaged parts. Despite initial skepticism, crew members from throughout the ship join the project. At Helo's suggestion, Tyrol uses carbon composites for the exterior, making it stealth capable. The completed fighter, known as the Blackbird, makes a successful maiden flight with Starbuck as test pilot.

At the Blackbird's dedication ceremony, President Laura Roslin, who has just learned she has weeks to live, praises the fighter's construction as "an act of faith." Tyrol reveals that the fighter is named Laura in her honor. Helo reconciles with his crewmates, and Tyrol visits Sharon in her cell.

== Characterization ==
In his podcast commentary on "Flight of the Phoenix," executive producer Ronald D. Moore discussed his views of what the episode's events reveal about several of the characters.

- Adama is a father figure who is trying to get his family, the crew of Galactica, to safety.
- Tyrol and Helo both harbor "a lot of rage... frustration... self-hatred and ambiguity" because of how they love Cylons. Each of them sees himself in the other, and this is why they fight.
- Tyrol begins the episode by disassembling an unserviceable Viper and brawling. He then turns that energy to build the Blackbird and ultimately "face[s] his demon" by talking to Sharon.
- The scene in which Apollo's sparring with Dee is interrupted by Billy Keikeya is intended to suggest a love triangle among the three.

Jen Segrest of TV Squad speculates that Sharon only helps the humans to protect her unborn child.

== Analysis ==
In Moore's view, Sharon inserting a cable into her arm and taking control of Galactica illustrates a difference in the Battlestar Galactica universe between humans and Cylons. Though Cylons choose to appear human out of respect for the form they believe to have been created by God, they are essentially mechanical beings.

Jacob Clifton of Television Without Pity expands on the human-machine dichotomy:

You've got this show about man vs. machine, and they're both using machines in the conflict, right, but then you've got a man [Tyrol] in love with a machine [Boomer], mourning that relationship using this fourth machine [the unserviceable Viper], and then attempting to remedy the non-machine void that the romance has left in him by building a fifth machine [the Blackbird]. Which itself becomes a symbol of the future of the fleet, not to mention a tribute to a completely unrelated person. During all of which, the big machine they all live in [Galactica] becomes a traitor, and they can only be saved by the original bad guy machine [Sharon], who's now a POW and having a human-machine baby.

Moore compares the Vipers' destruction of the Cylon ships to the Great Marianas Turkey Shoot in World War II.

== Production ==
The writers considered showing spreading the construction of the Blackbird over several episodes as a running subplot. Moore admitted that, realistically, building a starfighter would likely take weeks. However, they decided to tell the whole story in one episode as part of the theme of the fleet's morale, introduced by a comment from Commander Adama early in "Flight of the Phoenix". They also considered it unrealistic that Tyrol would be able to build a Viper, so they came up with another craft, the Blackbird stealth fighter.

Moore came up with the plot device of Sharon infecting the incoming Cylon ships because he wanted to try something other than an ordinary space battle. The specific mechanic of her inserting a cable into her arm began as a joke in the writers' room.

Early drafts went into detail about the consequences of wiping Galactica's computers, as Gaeta does following Sharon's instruction. This was to be not just navigational software but also all records of Colonial civilization. The idea was abandoned as too geeky to impart an emotional impact on the audience.

During the test flight, Starbuck and the Blackbird disappear briefly. Moore decided to elongate her absence after seeing footage of actor Aaron Douglas playing Tyrol nervously awaiting Starbuck's return. The test flight came after the dedication in the script, but they were switched in editing because the dedication was seen as the episode's "emotional climax".

Tyrol and Sharon were scripted to exchange a few lines of dialogue during Tyrol's visit at the end of the episode, but director Michael Nankin and film editor Jacques Gravett cut them. Moore approved of the change, saying, "it doesn't really matter what they say to each other". One version of the dialogue is included as a deleted scene on the DVD version of the episode.

One of the system malfunctions shown on Galactica in "Flight of the Phoenix" is the ship's firing range losing oxygen as Apollo, Starbuck, and Hot Dog practice shooting. According to Moore, the scene was scripted to give the audience a slowly building sense of discomfort. The three characters' differing reactions are based on observations of pilots under induced hypoxia. They save themselves by shooting out the range's window. Actors Jamie Bamber (Apollo) and Katee Sackhoff (Starbuck) came up with the idea that their characters should aim the weapon together.

== Reception ==
Critics reviewed "Flight of the Phoenix" favorably. Clifton gave it an A− and was particularly moved by the dedication scene. Simon Brew of Den of Geek called this scene "touching". Segrest reviewed the episode favorably, reacting emotionally to Tyrol's struggle to build the Blackbird. Amanda Keith of the Los Angeles Newspaper Group acknowledged several flaws in the plotting but said, nonetheless, "I love this episode."

Kelly Woo of TV Squad ranked "Flight of the Phoenix" as the 10th best episode of the re-imagined Battlestar Galactica. John Kubicek of BuddyTV ranked it 21st best and called the episode "inspirational". Alan Sepinwall listed it among his favorite episodes of the series.
