= Leonis =

Leonis can refer to:

- A fictional planet in Battlestar Galactica, one of the Twelve Colonies
- Stars of the constellation Leo
- Leonis (plant), a plant genus in the Asteraceae family
