= Colonel Tigh =

Colonel Tigh may refer to the following fictional characters:

- Colonel Tigh (Battlestar Galactica 1978)
- Colonel Tigh (Battlestar Galactica 2004)
