= List of Battlestar Galactica characters =

List of Battlestar Galactica characters may refer to:

- List of Battlestar Galactica (1978 TV series) and Galactica 1980 characters
- List of Battlestar Galactica (2004 TV series) characters
