= Battlestar Galactica (board game) =

1979 board game

Battlestar Galactica is a 1979 board game published by FASA.

== Gameplay ==
Battlestar Galactica is a wargame based on the 1978 Battlestar Galactica TV series, involving starfighter combat in Vipers and Raiders.

== Reception ==
Craig Sheeley reviewed Battlestar Galactica in Space Gamer No. 73. Sheeley commented that "Battlestar Galactica lives up to its subtitle: 'A game of starfighter combat.' If you love Galactica, or Vipers, this game is for you. Don't expect to be able to slug it out Battlestar to Base Ship, though."
