= List of Battlestar Galactica (1978 TV series) and Galactica 1980 episodes =

Battlestar Galactica is an American science fiction television series created by Glen A. Larson that aired on the ABC network from September 17, 1978, to April 29, 1979. It stars an ensemble cast led by Richard Hatch, Dirk Benedict and Lorne Greene. Canceled after 24 episodes, the series was revived as Galactica 1980, which aired for 10 episodes from January 27 to May 4, 1980.

The series follows a group of humans fleeing the destruction of their homeworlds aboard the titular spacecraft, searching for a new home while being pursued by the Cylons, a fearsome society of robots intent on exterminating all humans.

== Series overview ==
Season	Episodes	Originally released	
Season	Episodes	First released	Last released
Battlestar Galactica	24 (Note: The series consist of a three-hour pilot movie "Saga of a Star World" plus 21 episodes. The pilot movie was split into three one-hour episodes for syndication.)	September 17, 1978	April 29, 1979
Galactica 1980	10	January 27, 1980	May 4, 1980

== Episodes ==
=== Battlestar Galactica (1978–79) ===
No.	Title	Directed by	Written by	Original release date
1	"Saga of a Star World (aka Battlestar Galactica)"	Richard A. Colla	Glen A. Larson	September 17, 1978
2	"Saga of a Star World (aka Battlestar Galactica)"	Richard A. Colla	Glen A. Larson	September 17, 1978
3	"Saga of a Star World (aka Battlestar Galactica)"	Richard A. Colla	Glen A. Larson	September 17, 1978
In a distant part of the cosmos, the human race is embroiled in a thousand-year-long war with the robotic Cylons. Aided by the human traitor Baltar, an armistice turns out to be a ruse by the Cylons, who launch a massive surprise attack against the Twelve Colonies of humanity, almost wiping them out. Only the Battlestar Galactica, led by Commander Adama, and a ragtag fleet of 220 civilian ships survive, beginning a journey across the galaxy in search of long-lost sister civilization Earth. But the Cylons will not rest until every last human has been eliminated, and pursue them across the galaxy. (original movie split up during syndication.)
4	"Lost Planet of the Gods"	Christian I. Nyby II	Glen A. Larson, Donald Bellisario	September 24, 1978
5	"Lost Planet of the Gods"	Christian I. Nyby II	Glen A. Larson, Donald Bellisario	October 1, 1978
With many warriors suffering from an unknown ailment, the Galactica recruits new Viper pilots—mostly young women, including Apollo's new bride, Serina. Led by Adama's spiritual interpretations, the fleet enters a vast magnetic void, emerging at the planet Kobol, the legendary world from which humanity originated. Before Adama can discover Earth's location from the inscribed hieroglyphs, a Cylon attack destroys the sacred city on Kobol—and claims the life of Serina.
6	"The Lost Warrior"	Rod Holcomb	Teleplay by : Donald Bellisario; Story by : Herman Groves	October 8, 1978
Marooned on a frontier planet, Apollo befriends a young widow and her son, rallying a town against "Red Eye"— a likewise marooned, yet memory-damaged, Cylon centurion gunslinger. The storyline is very much reminiscent of the classic western Shane.
7	"The Long Patrol"	Christian I. Nyby II	Donald Bellisario	October 15, 1978
After losing an experimental Viper to a smuggler, Starbuck is imprisoned on a penal colony, but this new environment holds a possible clue to the location of Earth.
8	"The Gun on Ice Planet Zero"	Alan J. Levi	Teleplay by : Donald Bellisario, Glen A. Larson & Michael Sloan; Story by : John Ireland, Jr.	October 22, 1978
9	"The Gun on Ice Planet Zero"	Alan J. Levi	Teleplay by : Donald Bellisario, Glen A. Larson & Michael Sloan; Story by : John Ireland, Jr.	October 29, 1978
Herded into a confined area of space by the Cylons, the fleet must pass within close range of a lethal Cylon pulsar cannon—unless an expedition of officers from the Galactica and a team of convicts can penetrate the ice-bound fortress housing the weapon and destroy it. The storyline was directly inspired by the classic war film The Guns of Navarone. Apollo, Starbuck, and Boomer lead a team of cutthroat demolitions and cold-weather experts (and the stowaway Boxey). Along the way, they encounter the misguided human scientist who originally built the weapon, as well as his legions of clones.
10	"The Magnificent Warriors"	Christian I. Nyby II	Glen A. Larson	November 12, 1978
When a Cylon attack destroys the fleet's food supply, Adama and the others must agree to certain compromises with old acquaintances and with the inhabitants of a grain-rich, yet politically turbulent planet. The storyline is very much reminiscent of the classic western The Magnificent Seven.
11	"The Young Lords"	Donald Bellisario	Donald Bellisario, Frank Lupo & Paul Playdon	November 19, 1978
After crash landing on the planet Attila, Starbuck befriends a group of young siblings trying to free their castle, their planet, and their father from the Cylons.
12	"The Living Legend"	Vince Edwards	Teleplay by : Glen A. Larson; Story by : Glen A. Larson & Ken Pettus	November 26, 1978
13	"The Living Legend"	Vince Edwards	Teleplay by : Glen A. Larson; Story by : Glen A. Larson & Ken Pettus	December 3, 1978
The Galactica is reunited with the Battlestar Pegasus, previously thought destroyed. Led by the brilliant but arrogant Commander Cain, the fleet is torn in its loyalty between Adama and Cain until the human traitor Baltar launches a devastating attack. In order to obtain much-needed fuel, the Galactica and Pegasus join forces in a daring attack on the Cylons. The Pegasus plunges into the teeth of Cylon forces and is either destroyed or "missing in action" after the attack.
14	"Fire in Space"	Christian I. Nyby II	Teleplay by : Jim Carlson & Terrence McDonnell; Story by : Michael Sloan	December 17, 1978
The Galactica is rammed by Cylon Raiders making suicide runs on the main bridge and a landing bay. With Adama lying critically injured and the ship in flames, Lieutenants Athena and Boomer lead a group of survivors in the rejuvenation center, relying on Boxey's robot daggit, Muffit, to help them. The storyline took its inspiration from the classic disaster film The Towering Inferno.
15	"War of the Gods"	Daniel Haller	Glen A. Larson	January 14, 1979
16	"War of the Gods"	Daniel Haller	Glen A. Larson	January 21, 1979
Vipers are disappearing from regular patrols, and mysterious bright lights are flying around the Galactica at immeasurable speed. On an eerie, red-glowing planet, the enigmatic Count Iblis (portrayed by Patrick Macnee), is found, apparently the sole survivor of a major catastrophe. Always shunning the mysterious bright lights, Iblis (a character very much like the Devil) uses his charm and his supernatural powers to wrest control of the fleet from Adama, but the wiley Commander knows Iblis' key is on the red planet, where Apollo and Starbuck go only to face tragedy and find the answer to the mysterious lights.
17	"The Man with Nine Lives"	Rod Holcomb	Donald Bellisario	January 28, 1979
An old con man named Chameleon (Fred Astaire) meets Starbuck and cons him into believing he may be his father in order to gain his help in evading a trio of blood-thirsty Borellians who are after him seeking revenge for a previous con. In the process, Starbuck's girlfriend Cassiopeia learns that Chameleon's con may not actually be a con after all.
18	"Murder on the Rising Star"	Rod Holcomb	Teleplay by : Donald Bellisario, Jim Carlson & Terrence McDonnell; Story by : Michael Sloan	February 18, 1979
When Starbuck is implicated in a rival triad-player's murder, Apollo and Boomer come to his defense as Protectors. They eventually uncover a plot involving Karibdis, a traitor alongside Lord Baltar in the Destruction of the Twelve Colonies.
19	"Greetings from Earth"	Rod Holcomb	Glen A. Larson	February 25, 1979
20	"Greetings from Earth"	Rod Holcomb	Glen A. Larson	February 25, 1979
A ship of humans in suspended animation is found drifting in space. When brought aboard the Galactica, the Colonial leaders debate whether to awaken its occupants. Their ship is eventually escorted by Apollo, Starbuck, and Cassiopeia to the planet Paradeen which is embroiled in a bitter war with the Eastern Alliance. (Originally aired as a two-hour broadcast the episode was split into two parts in syndication)
21	"Baltar's Escape"	Winrich Kolbe	Donald Bellisario	March 11, 1979
Baltar escapes from the prison barge by hijacking a shuttle piloted by Boomer and Sheba. Taking advantage of lax security imposed by the new governing council, Baltar kidnaps the council members from a Galactica landing bay and demands to be released.
22	"Experiment in Terra"	Rod Holcomb	Glen A. Larson	March 18, 1979
The mysterious bright lights return again, transporting the bewildered Apollo to the planet Terra to avert war with the Eastern Alliance. Exposing a plan by the devious president, Apollo has Starbuck warn the Galactica, which uses its laser cannon to destroy all the ballistic missiles, avoiding apocalyptic planetary holocaust.
23	"Take the Celestra"	Daniel Haller	Teleplay by : Jim Carlson & Terrence McDonnell; Story by : David S. Arthur, Jim Carlson, Terrence McDonnell & David G. Phinney	April 1, 1979
When Starbuck encounters his long-lost love Aurora, she complicates matters by taking part in a mutinous rebellion aboard the Celestra. Her rebellion, undertaken for a noble cause, is soon overshadowed by a sinister mutiny by Charka, the Celestra's power-hungry second-in-command.
24	"The Hand of God"	Donald Bellisario	Donald Bellisario	April 29, 1979
Receiving a mysterious radio signal possibly from Earth, Adama and the crew are wary of a Cylon trap, and decide to turn the tables by attacking the Cylons with a captured Cylon Raider. Apollo and Starbuck, in the series finale's last scene, narrowly miss receiving Apollo 11 Moon landing transmissions from Earth.

=== Galactica 1980 (1980) ===
No.	Title	Directed by	Written by	Original release date
1	"Galactica 1980: Galactica Discovers Earth"	Sidney Hayers	Glen A. Larson	January 27, 1980
2	"Galactica 1980: Galactica Discovers Earth"	Sidney Hayers	Glen A. Larson	February 3, 1980
3	"Galactica 1980: Galactica Discovers Earth"	Sidney Hayers	Glen A. Larson	February 10, 1980
After 30 years of searching, the battlestar Galactica and its rag-tag fleet locate Earth. However, it soon becomes clear that Earth is not advanced enough to help combat the Cylon fleet that tailed Galactica to Earth. Captain Troy – a grown-up version of Boxey – and Lieutenant Dillon end up teaming up with an Earthling, reporter Jamie Hamilton. Commander Xaviar steals an experimental Viper capable of time travel and goes back to the 1940s in an attempt to speed up Earth's technological development by giving Colonial technology to the Nazis. Jamie, Troy and Dillon travel back in time in pursuit of Xaviar, and manage to prevent the Nazis from prematurely developing the V-2 rocket. Xaviar escapes, and the others return to 1980, where all three Vipers are discovered by the military.
4	"The Super Scouts"	Vince Edwards	Glen A. Larson	March 16, 1980
5	"The Super Scouts"	Sigmund Neufeld, Jr.	Glen A. Larson	March 23, 1980
The fleet is attacked by Cylons, who destroy the school barge. Troy, Dillon and a shuttle-load of Galactican school children make an emergency landing on Earth. The Galactican children attempt to fit in on Earth and uncover an illegal toxic-waste dumping conspiracy.
6	"Spaceball"	Barry Crane	Frank Lupo, Jeff Freilich & Glen A. Larson	March 30, 1980
The "Super Scouts" use their superhuman strength as ringers in a baseball game while Xaviar plots their abduction.
7	"The Night the Cylons Landed"	Sigmund Neufeld, Jr.	Glen A. Larson	April 13, 1980
8	"The Night the Cylons Landed"	Barry Crane	Glen A. Larson	April 20, 1980
A new advanced Cylon Raider is shot down over Earth. Two of its five crew survive—a Centurion, and a new, advanced humanoid Cylon—and are loose on Earth during Halloween. Troy and Dillon attempt to kill the Cylons on Earth before they can contact their empire.
9	"Space Croppers"	Daniel Haller	Robert L. McCullough	April 27, 1980
The Galactican children help a farmer in financial trouble. This is the last episode set on Earth and the final appearance of most of the cast.
10	"The Return of Starbuck"	Ron Satlof	Glen A. Larson	May 4, 1980
Dr. Zee relates a dream he had about his origin and a warrior named Starbuck to a surprised Adama. At some point between the events of Battlestar Galactica and Galactica 1980, Starbuck crash lands on a remote planet, and builds a robot companion from Cylon parts, which he names "Cy". As Cy tries to understand human relationships, Starbuck helps a mysterious woman, Angela (Judith Chapman), give birth to a baby boy. Starbuck sends Angela and the baby off toward the Galactica in an escape ship cobbled together with Cy's assistance. A Cylon ship arrives and Cy destroys its occupants to protect his "friend" Starbuck, though Cy is himself irreparably damaged in the encounter. Starbuck remains stranded on the planet, which he has named after himself. The escape pod arrives at the Galactica, containing only the baby, who will grow up to be Dr. Zee.

== Releases ==
=== Theatrical releases ===
Between 1978 and 1981, episodes were edited into three feature-length films. The first film, Battlestar Galactica, was an edited version of the pilot, "Saga of a Star World", featuring some differences from the original televised episodes, including the death of Baltar. It was released in cinemas in Canada, New Zealand, Australia and continental Europe before its American TV premiere and, in 1979, it was released theatrically in the UK, Ireland and the US. The second film, Mission Galactica: The Cylon Attack, was a re-edited version of the episodes "The Living Legend" and "Fire in Space", which also differed from the broadcast versions, omitting several scenes from both episodes. In 1979, it was released theatrically in continental Europe and Japan, and in the UK, New Zealand and Australia in 1980. The third film, Conquest of the Earth (also called "Galactica III" on the German poster), was a similar edit, though this time its source episodes were from Galactica 1980. It was also released theatrically, in 1981, in Europe, New Zealand and Australia.

Title	Release	Notes
Battlestar Galactica	1978	Edited version of "Saga of a Star World"
Mission Galactica: The Cylon Attack	1979	Merger of "The Living Legend" and "Fire in Space"
Conquest of the Earth	1981	Edited merger of "Galactica Discovers Earth" and "The Night the Cylons Landed"

=== Television movies ===
Following the cancellation of the series, all of the episodes from the original series were re-edited into television movies for syndication, including a third edit of the pilot. The four two-part episodes ("Lost Planet of the Gods", "Gun on Ice Planet Zero", "The Living Legend" and "War of the Gods") were all combined and expanded with about five minutes of scenes deleted from the original broadcasts. The remaining single episodes were edited into two-hour blocks, combining two episodes into a single narrative, occasionally including over-dubbed dialogue. The final TV movie, an expanded version of "Experiment in Terra" with some scenes from the Galactica 1980 episode "The Return of Starbuck", featured new footage of an astronaut finding Commander Adama's logbook, which retold the premise of the show. It is believed that this version of the episode was to be released as another theatrical film in other countries, but never materialized.

#	TV movie title	Original episodes
1	Battlestar Galactica	"Saga of a Star World"
2	Lost Planet of the Gods	"Lost Planet of the Gods" (expanded)
3	Gun on Ice Planet Zero	"Gun on Ice Planet Zero" (expanded)
4	The Phantom in Space	"The Hand of God" and "The Lost Warrior"
5	Space Prison	"The Man with Nine Lives" and "Baltar's Escape"
6	Space Casanova	"Take the Celestra" and "The Long Patrol"
7	Curse of the Cylons	"Fire in Space" and "The Magnificent Warriors"
8	The Living Legend	"The Living Legend" (expanded)
9	War of the Gods	"War of the Gods" (expanded)
10	Greetings from Earth	"Greetings from Earth"
11	Murder in Space	"Murder on the Rising Star" and "The Young Lords"
12	Experiment in Terra (Note: The Experiment in Terra telemovie is not included on the UK PAL VHS box set; it has only the original episode "Experiment in Terra" without any clips from "Return of Starbuck." However, all the other telemovies appear to be in this set.)	"The Return of Starbuck" (edited) and "Experiment in Terra" (expanded)
