= Battlestar Galactica =

American science fiction franchise

- Franchise logo
- Created by: Glen A. Larson
- Original work: Battlestar Galactica (1978)
- Owner: NBCUniversal
- Years: 1978–2012

Print publications
- Books: List of books
- Comics: List of comics

Films and television
- Film: Battlestar Galactica (1978)
- Television series: Battlestar Galactica (1978–79); Galactica 1980 (1980); Battlestar Galactica (2003–09); Caprica (2010)
- Web series: The Resistance (2006); Razor Flashbacks (2007); The Face of the Enemy (2008–09); Blood & Chrome (2012)
- Television films: Razor (2007); The Plan (2009)

Games
- Video games: List of video games

Battlestar Galactica is an American science fiction media franchise created by Glen A. Larson. It began with the original television series in 1978, in which the first few episodes were released in theaters as a movie covering the invasion of Caprica and the Galactica's harrowing escape with a 'rag-tag fugitive fleet', followed quickly by the television series. This was followed by a short-run sequel series, Galactica 1980, a line of book adaptations, original novels, comic books, a board game, and video games. A "re-imagined" reboot aired as a two-part, three-hour miniseries developed by Ronald D. Moore and David Eick in 2003, followed by a 2004 television series, which aired until 2009. A prequel series, Caprica, aired in 2010.

All Battlestar Galactica productions share the premise that in a distant part of the universe, a human civilization has extended to a group of planets known as the Twelve Colonies, to which they have migrated from their ancestral homeworld of Kobol. The Twelve Colonies have been engaged in a lengthy war with the Cylons, a cybernetic race whose goal is the extermination of the human species. The Cylons offer peace to the humans, which proves to be a ruse. With the aid of a human named Baltar, the Cylons carry out a massive nuclear attack on the Twelve Colonies and the Colonial Fleet of starships that protect them, devastating the fleet, laying waste to the Colonies, and destroying all but a small remnant population. Survivors flee into outer space aboard a motley fleet of spaceworthy ships. Of the Colonial battle fleet, only the Battlestar Galactica, a gigantic battleship and spacecraft carrier, appears to have survived the attack. Under the leadership of Commander Adama, the Galactica and the pilots of "Viper fighters" lead a fugitive fleet of survivors in search of the fabled thirteenth colony known as Earth.

== Television series ==
Series	Season	Episodes	Originally released			Creator(s) / Developer(s)
Series	Season	Episodes	First released	Last released	Network	Creator(s) / Developer(s)
Original continuity
Battlestar Galactica	1	24	September 17, 1978	April 29, 1979	ABC	Glen A. Larson
Galactica 1980	1	10	January 27, 1980	May 4, 1980	ABC	Glen A. Larson
New continuity
Battlestar Galactica	miniseries	2	December 8, 2003	December 9, 2003	Sci Fi	Ronald D. Moore & David Eick
Battlestar Galactica	1	13	January 15, 2005 / October 18, 2004 (Sky1)	April 1, 2005 / January 24, 2005 (Sky1)	Sci Fi	Ronald D. Moore
Battlestar Galactica	2	20	July 15, 2005	March 10, 2006	Sci Fi	Ronald D. Moore
Battlestar Galactica	3	20	October 6, 2006	March 25, 2007	Sci Fi	Ronald D. Moore
Battlestar Galactica	4	21	April 4, 2008	March 20, 2009	Sci Fi	Ronald D. Moore
Caprica	1	19	January 22, 2010	November 30, 2010	Syfy (Note: Sci Fi was rebranded as Syfy on 7 July 2009.)	Remi Aubuchon & Ronald D. Moore

=== Original continuity ===
==== Battlestar Galactica (1978–79) ====
Glen A. Larson, the creator and executive producer of Battlestar Galactica, claimed he had conceived of the Battlestar Galactica premise, which he called Adam's Ark, during the late 1960s. As James E. Ford detailed in "Battlestar Galactica and Mormon Theology", a paper read at the Joint Conference of the American Culture and Popular Culture Associations on April 17, 1980 (and published as "Theology in Prime Time Science Fiction: Battlestar Galactica and Mormon Doctrine", Journal of Popular Culture #17 [1983]: 83–87), the series incorporated many themes from Mormon theology, such as marriage for "time and eternity", a "council of twelve", a lost thirteenth tribe of humans, and a planet called Kobol (an anagram of Kolob), as Larson was a member of the Church of Jesus Christ of Latter-day Saints. However, he was unable to find financial backing for his TV series for a number of years. Battlestar Galactica was finally produced in the wake of the success of the 1977 film Star Wars. The original Cylons of Battlestar Galactica, robotic antagonists bent on destroying all humankind, owe much to Fred Saberhagen's berserker stories, including Saberhagen's fictional race the Builders whose "sliding single red eye" became the signature design element for the Cylons.

Larson had envisioned Battlestar Galactica as a series of made-for-TV movies (a three-hour pilot program and two two-hour episodes) for the American Broadcasting Company (ABC). A shortened version of the three-hour pilot, Saga of a Star World, was screened in Canadian theaters (before the TV series was telecast) and in American, European and Australian theaters later on. Instead of two additional TV movies, ABC decided to commission a weekly TV series of one-hour episodes.

In 1979 at the sixth annual People's Choice Awards, the TV series won in the category of "Best New TV Drama Series".

The first episode of the TV series (the long pilot TV movie) was broadcast on September 17, 1978. About 30 minutes before the scheduled end, that broadcast was interrupted by the signing of the Egyptian–Israeli Camp David Accords. After the interruption (which was nearly an hour in length), the episode picked back up where it left off.

During the eight months after the pilot's first broadcast, 17 original episodes of the series were made (five of them two-part shows), equivalent to a standard 24-episode TV season. Citing declining ratings and cost overruns, ABC canceled Battlestar Galactica in April 1979. Its final episode "The Hand of God" was telecast on April 29, 1979.

==== Galactica 1980 (1980) ====
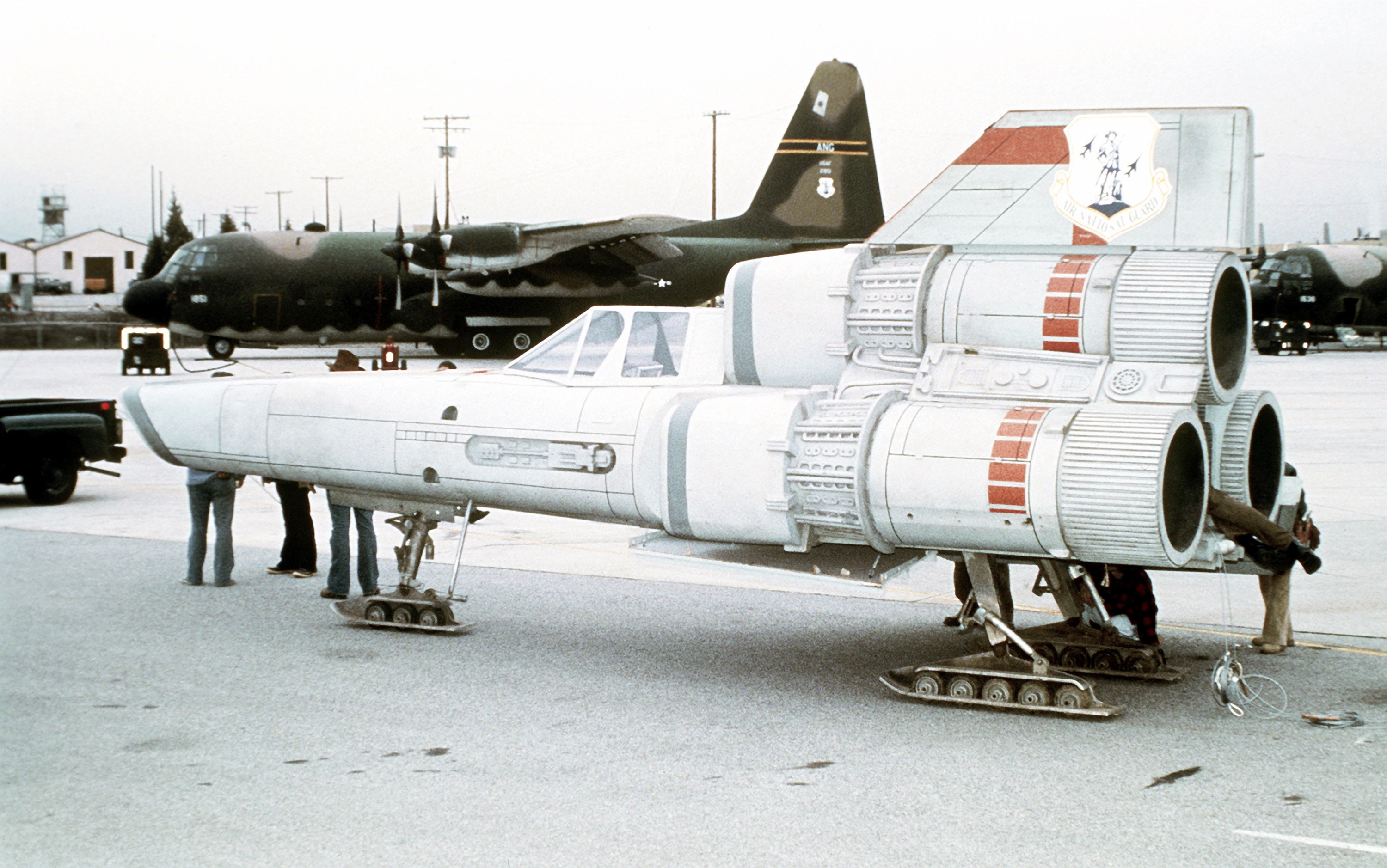
The Viper as it appears in Galactica 1980.

During the autumn of 1979, ABC executives met with Battlestar Galactica's creator Glen Larson to consider restarting the series. A suitable concept was needed to draw viewers, and it was decided that the arrival of the Colonial Fleet at present-day Earth would be the storyline. A new TV movie called Galactica 1980 was produced. Again, it was decided this new version of Battlestar Galactica would be made into a weekly TV series. Despite the early success of the premiere, this program failed to achieve the popularity of the original series, and it was canceled after just ten episodes.

In this 1980 sequel series, the Colonial fleet finds the Earth, and then it covertly protects it from the Cylons. This series was a quick failure due to its low budget (e.g., recycling footage from the 1974 Universal Studios movie Earthquake during a Cylon attack sequence), widely panned writing, and ill-chosen time slot (Sunday evenings, a time generally reserved for family-oriented programming and, more specifically, also for the 60 Minutes newsmagazine program). The TV series also had to adhere to strict content restrictions such as limiting the number of acts of violence and being required to shoehorn educational content into the script and dialogue.

To cut costs, the show was set mostly on the contemporary Earth, to the great dismay of fans. Another factor for fan apathy was the nearly complete recasting of the original series: Lorne Greene reprised his role as Adama, but Herb Jefferson Jr. played "Colonel" Boomer in only about half of the episodes (with little screentime), and Dirk Benedict returned as Starbuck just for one episode (the abrupt final episode, though his character was to have also appeared in the unfilmed episode "Wheel of Fire", which was a semi-sequel to "The Return of Starbuck"). Richard Hatch (Apollo in the original series) was sent a script for Galactica 1980, but he turned it down since he was not sure what his part in the series would be now that all the characters had changed.

Some TV syndication packages for Battlestar Galactica incorporate the episodes of this series.

=== New continuity ===
==== Miniseries (2003) ====
Despite attempts to revive the series over the years, none came to fruition until it was rebooted in 2003 by Universal Television as Battlestar Galactica, a three-hour miniseries in which a long-standing armistice following a war between humans and Cylons is broken by a second Cylon War, when the machines launch a sneak attack, wiping out virtually all of humanity. Commissioned by the Sci-Fi Channel, screenwriter Ronald D. Moore and producer David Eick were the creative forces behind it. Academy Award–nominated actor Edward James Olmos was cast in the role of Commander Adama, while two-time Academy Award nominee Mary McDonnell was cast as President Laura Roslin. Starbuck and Boomer were now female characters, portrayed by Katee Sackhoff and Grace Park respectively. Other cast members included Jamie Bamber (Captain Lee "Apollo" Adama), James Callis (Dr. Gaius Baltar), and Tricia Helfer as a Cylon-humanoid known as Number Six. The miniseries was a ratings success for the Sci-Fi Channel and it commissioned a new weekly Battlestar Galactica series to follow.

==== Battlestar Galactica (2004–09) ====
The new television series was co-funded by the UK's Sky Television, and premiered in the United Kingdom on the Sky1 satellite channel in October 2004. The series was then broadcast in North America on the Sci-Fi Channel in January 2005. Continuing where the 2003 miniseries left off, the main cast all returned to reprise their roles. Several new characters were introduced, and Richard Hatch, who played Captain Apollo in the 1970s Battlestar Galactica TV series, also appeared in several episodes as Tom Zarek, a former political terrorist who later becomes part of the new Colonial government.

An edited version of the pilot miniseries was aired on NBC on January 9, 2005, five days before the Sci-Fi series premiere. NBC also aired three selected first-season episodes to promote the show in advance of the second-season premiere in July 2005. The series ran for four seasons between 2004 and 2009. The second season was split into two halves screened several months apart. Due to production delays caused by the 2007–2008 Writers Guild strike, the fourth season was also split into two parts, with a seven-month hiatus in between.

The series has won widespread critical acclaim among many mainstream non-SF-genre publications. Time and New York Newsday named it the best show on television in 2005. Other publications such as The New York Times, The New Yorker, National Review and Rolling Stone magazine also gave the show positive reviews.

The show has received a Peabody Award for overall excellence, several Emmy Awards for Visual Effects, and Emmy nominations for Writing and Directing. Time magazine named it one of the 100 Best TV Shows of All Time.

==== Caprica (2010) ====
Caprica is a prequel television series to the re-imagined Battlestar Galactica. It premiered on Syfy (formerly Sci-Fi) on January 22, 2010, and was described as "television's first science fiction family saga". It was a two-hour back door pilot for a possible weekly television series, but on December 2, 2008, Syfy gave the go-ahead to expand the project into a full, 20-episode series. Caprica is set on the titular planet, 58 years before the events of Battlestar Galactica. The show revolves around two families, the Adamas and the Graystones, and the creation of the Cylons.

The pilot was directed by Jeffrey Reiner and starred Eric Stoltz, Esai Morales, Paula Malcomson, Alessandra Torresani, and Polly Walker. The pilot was released on DVD on April 21, 2009, and the series was broadcast in January 2010.

On October 27, 2010, Syfy canceled Caprica due to low ratings. The final five episodes were aired in the US on January 4, 2011, though they had aired a couple of months earlier on the Canadian network Space. The entire series was released on DVD in 2011.

== Web series ==
Web series	Episodes	Originally released		
Web series	Episodes	First released	Last released	Network
The Resistance	10	September 5, 2006	October 5, 2006	Sci Fi's website
Razor Flashbacks	7	October 5, 2007	November 16, 2007	Sci Fi's website
The Face of the Enemy	10	December 12, 2008	January 12, 2009	Sci Fi's website
Blood & Chrome	10	November 9, 2012	December 7, 2012	Machinima.com

=== The Resistance (2006) ===
The first set of webisodes were a series of shorts produced in 2006 to promote the third season of the re-imagined show. Made as an "optional extra" to Season 3, the webisodes filled in some of the events between the second and third seasons and featured some of the main cast, though did not reveal what would happen in the beginning of Season 3, nor was viewing them essential to follow the story of the third season. Each of the ten webisodes was approximately three minutes long, and they were released twice a week leading up to the U.S. Season 3 premiere in 2006.

=== Razor Flashbacks (2007) ===
The Razor Flashbacks were a series of seven webisodes produced in 2007, set some 40 years earlier during William Adama's fighter pilot days during the later stages of the First Cylon War. They were released on the Internet as "webisodes" leading up to Razor's release. They were included on the DVD and Blu-Ray releases of Battlestar Galactica: Razor, and some are inserted into both the broadcast and extended cuts of the movie on DVD and Blu-Ray. The installments that did not make the final cut include 1, 2, and the latter half of 7.

=== The Face of the Enemy (2008) ===
A set of ten webisodes were released during the seven-month hiatus between episodes 10 and 11 of Season 4. Titled The Face of the Enemy, the web series premiered on December 12, 2008, on SciFi.com.

=== Blood & Chrome (2012) ===
Battlestar Galactica: Blood & Chrome was to be a spin-off series from the re-imagined Battlestar Galactica series. Syfy approached show runner Ronald D. Moore to produce another spin-off set in the reimagined Battlestar Galactica universe, which was to begin as a two-hour pilot focused on William "Husker" Adama (portrayed by Luke Pasqualino) during the First Cylon War (as was glimpsed in Razor and the corresponding webisodes).

Syfy decided against moving forward with the Blood and Chrome TV series, but aired a 10-part webseries over four weeks via Machinima.com, beginning on November 9, 2012. The webseries was also aired as a 2-hour movie on Syfy on February 10, 2013, and was released on DVD shortly afterwards.

== Films ==
=== Battlestar Galactica ===
Battlestar Galactica is a re-edit of the pilot episode of the 1978 TV series, Saga of a Star World. It was released theatrically in Canada before the television series aired in the United States, in order to help recoup its high production costs. Later, the standalone film edit was also released in the United States.

=== Razor ===
Battlestar Galactica: Razor is a 2007 television movie produced and broadcast in the gap between Seasons 3 and 4 of the new series. Razor is also the first two episodes of Season 4 though it chronicles events on Battlestar Pegasus in two time periods, both of which are "in the past" with respect to the Season 4 continuity. The "present day" framing scenes are set during Lee Adama's command of the Pegasus in the latter half of Season 2, while "flashback" scenes depict Helena Cain's command in the period between the Cylon attack (shown in the 2003 mini-series) and the reunion with the Galactica in the second season. It aired in the United States and Canada on November 24, 2007, and in the UK and Ireland on December 18, 2007. An expanded version of the movie was released on DVD on December 4, 2007.

=== The Plan ===
Sci Fi Channel produced a two-hour TV movie which was planned to air after the final episode of the series in 2009. The movie began production on September 8, 2008. The movie premiered exclusively on DVD, Blu-ray and digital download on October 27, 2009 and aired on January 10, 2010, on Sci Fi. Written by Jane Espenson and directed by Edward James Olmos, The Plan storyline begins before the attack on the Twelve Colonies and shows events primarily from the perspective of the Cylons. Edward James Olmos reprised his role as Adama, and ten of the eleven actors who played Cylons appeared, including Michael Trucco, Aaron Douglas, Dean Stockwell, Tricia Helfer, Grace Park, Rick Worthy, Matthew Bennett, Callum Keith Rennie, Michael Hogan and Rekha Sharma. The only "Cylon" actor not present was Lucy Lawless (although previously filmed footage of her was included).

=== Feature film ===
In 1999, the producer of Wing Commander, Todd Moyer, and the producer of the original TV series, Glen Larson, planned to produce a motion picture based on the TV series. It would have featured Battlestar Pegasus.

Creator Glen A. Larson entered negotiations with Universal Pictures for a film adaptation of the 1978 series in February 2009. Bryan Singer signed on to direct the reboot the following August, but was obliged to direct Jack the Giant Slayer. In October 2011 John Orloff was hired to write the script. "I have wanted to write this movie since I was 12 years old, and built a Galactica model from scratch out of balsa wood, cardboard, old model parts and LEDs", Orloff told Deadline Hollywood. By August 2012 the script was being rewritten, with Singer explaining that "It will exist, I think, quite well between the Glen Larson and Ron Moore universes". On April 7, 2014, the studio hired Jack Paglen to write the script for the film. On February 12, 2016, Universal signed Michael De Luca, Scott Stuber and Dylan Clark to produce the Battlestar Galactica film. On June 9, 2016, Lisa Joy was reportedly writing the film, and Francis Lawrence was in talks to direct. On December 18, 2018, it was reported that Jay Basu (The Girl in the Spider's Web) had been hired to rewrite Joy's script. On October 22, 2020, The Hollywood Reporter revealed that Simon Kinberg will be writing and co-producing the film with Dylan Clark.

=== Cinema releases ===
Besides a re-edited version of the pilot, released in Canada, Europe, parts of Latin America, and, following the broadcast of the series, in the U.S., two other Battlestar Galactica feature films were released in cinemas. Mission Galactica: The Cylon Attack and Conquest of the Earth were made up of various episodes of the original series and Galactica 1980 respectively. (See List of Battlestar Galactica (1978 TV series) and Galactica 1980 episodes § Theatrical releases)

== Attempted revivals ==
The original series maintained a cult fandom, which supported efforts by Glen A. Larson, Richard Hatch, and Bryan Singer (independently of one another) to revive the premise.

=== Battlestar Galactica: The Second Coming ===
Richard Hatch produced a demonstration video in 1998 to 1999 which featured several actors from the original series combined with state-of-the-art special effects. This video, titled Battlestar Galactica: The Second Coming, was screened at some science fiction conventions, but it did not lead to a new series.

=== Bryan Singer revival ===
In 2000, the director and an executive producer of the X-Men movie, Bryan Singer and Tom DeSanto, began developing a Battlestar Galactica TV miniseries under the auspices of Studios USA for the Fox TV network. A continuation of the original series but set 25 years later, Singer and DeSanto's version included several members of the original cast reprising their original roles and the introduction of newer characters. It was intended to be telecast as a backdoor pilot in May 2002, and pre-production commenced and sets had even been partially constructed with a view to filming starting in November 2001. However, production delays caused by the September 11, 2001 attacks meant that Bryan Singer had to drop out, due to his commitment to direct X-Men 2. This caused the executives of Fox TV to cancel the project.

=== Proposed Peacock series ===
In September 2019, NBCUniversal was planning a new series as part of their Peacock streaming service, set in the same continuity as the 2004 Battlestar Galactica series, and produced by Sam Esmail. In March 2021, writer and producer Michael Lesslie had reportedly left the project, leaving production plans in doubt. In July 2024, Variety reported that Peacock were no longer developing the series, though the project was planned to be shopped to other networks.

== Books ==
Both the original and the reimagined series have had books published about the series, academically oriented analysis, novelizations, and new works based on the characters.

=== Original series books ===
These Battlestar Galactica softcover novelizations were written by Glen A. Larson with the authors listed below. They were critically disparaged, but proved popular, with the first novel selling over a million copies within its first year. The first ten novels adapt the episode of the same title except as indicated. All novels except Battlestar Galactica 14: Surrender the Galactica! (ACE publishing) were originally published by Berkley, and have been republished, recently, by I Books, which called them Battlestar Galactica Classic to differentiate it from the reimagined series. The episodic novels featured expanded scenes, excerpts from "The Adama Journals", more background on the characters, and the expansion of the ragtag fleet to almost 22,000 ships as opposed to the 220 in the TV series.

A new book series written by series star Richard Hatch starting in the 1990s continued the original story based on his attempt to revive the series, and ignored the events of Galactica 1980. His series picked up several years after the TV series ended, and featured Apollo in command of the Galactica after the death of Adama, a grown-up Boxey, who was now a Viper pilot, and the rediscovery of Commander Cain and the battlestar Pegasus, who had started a new colony and was preparing to restart the war with the Cylons.

Episodic novels

- Battlestar Galactica, with Robert Thurston (novel version of "Saga of a Star-World")
- Battlestar Galactica 2: The Cylon Death Machine, with Robert Thurston (novel version of "The Gun on Ice Planet Zero")
- Battlestar Galactica 3: The Tombs of Kobol, with Robert Thurston (novel version of "Lost Planet of the Gods")
- Battlestar Galactica 4: The Young Warriors, with Robert Thurston (adapts "The Young Lords")
- Battlestar Galactica 5: Galactica Discovers Earth, with Michael Resnick (adapts the Galactica 1980 three part episode)
- Battlestar Galactica 6: The Living Legend, with Nicholas Yermakov
- Battlestar Galactica 7: War of the Gods, with Nicholas Yermakov
- Battlestar Galactica 8: Greetings from Earth, with Ron Goulart
- Battlestar Galactica 9: Experiment in Terra, with Ron Goulart (adapts the titular episode as well as "Baltar's Escape")
- Battlestar Galactica 10: The Long Patrol, with Ron Goulart

Original novels

- Battlestar Galactica 11: The Nightmare Machine, with Robert Thurston
- Battlestar Galactica 12: "Die, Chameleon!", with Robert Thurston
- Battlestar Galactica 13: Apollo's War, with Robert Thurston
- Battlestar Galactica 14: Surrender the Galactica!, with Robert Thurston

Original novels by Richard Hatch

- Battlestar Galactica: Armageddon, with Christopher Golden
- Battlestar Galactica: Warhawk, with Christopher Golden
- Battlestar Galactica: Resurrection, with Stan Timmons
- Battlestar Galactica: Rebellion, with Alan Rogers
- Battlestar Galactica: Paradis, with Brad Linaweaver
- Battlestar Galactica: Destiny, with Brad Linaweaver
- Battlestar Galactica: Redemption, with Brad Linaweaver

=== Reimagined series books ===
Tor Science Fiction has published the following works in both hardcover and paperback format.

- Battlestar Galactica by Jeffrey A. Carver
- The Cylons' Secret by Craig Shaw Gardner
- Sagittarius Is Bleeding by Peter David
- Unity by Steven Harper

=== Academic analysis ===
- Somewhere Beyond the Heavens: Exploring Battlestar Galactica, by Rich Handley and Lou Tambone
- Cylons in America: Critical Studies in Battlestar Galactica
- So Say We All: An Unauthorized Collection of Thoughts and Opinions on Battlestar Galactica, edited by Richard Hatch
- Battlestar Galactica and International Relations by Nicholas J. Kiersey and Iver B. Neumann (editors)
- An Analytical Guide to Television's Battlestar Galactica by John Kenneth Muir

== Comic books ==
A series of comic book publishers have adapted Battlestar Galactica since its inception.

Marvel Comics published a 23-issue comic book series based upon the show between 1978 and 1981. Walt Simonson, who later wrote and drew Thor and had a long stint on Marvel's Star Wars comic, was the artist for the series at its conclusion. Other comics have since been published by Maximum Press, Grandreams, Look-in magazine, Realm Press, and Dynamite Comics.

Dynamite Entertainment was the last company to publish comic books featuring both the classic and reimagined Battlestar Galactica series. They also released a four-issue Galactica 1980 comic miniseries written by Marc Guggenheim. The limited miniseries was a re-imagining of the original series but at the end featured a second, smaller Battlestar (replacing the original which was destroyed) also named Galactica but strongly resembling the ship seen in the reimagined Sci-Fi Channel series.

== Games ==
=== Video games ===
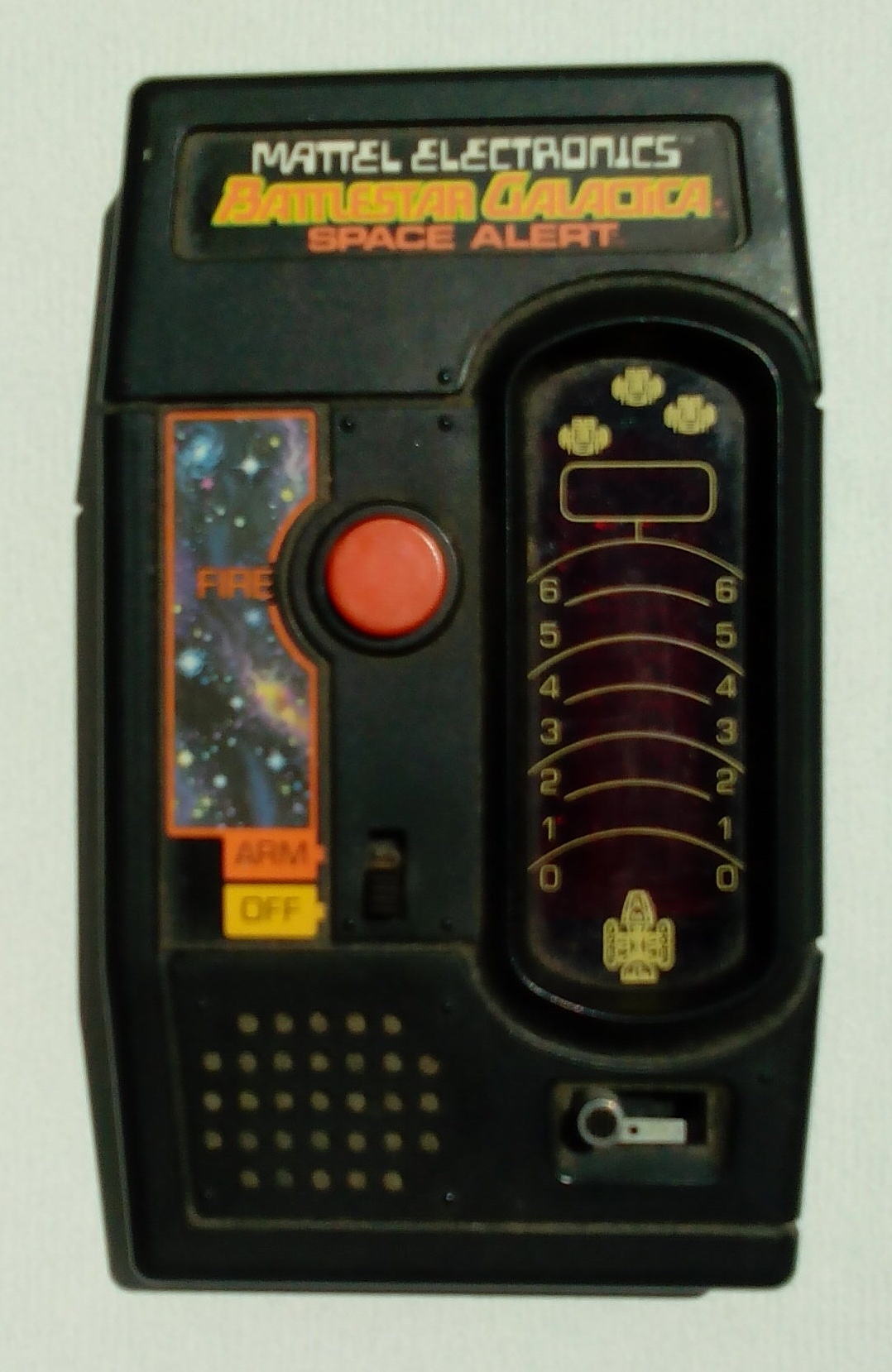
Mattel Battlestar Galactica game, circa 1978

In 1978, Mattel Electronics released a handheld electronic LED game based on the series. The player tries to defend Galactica from kamikaze Cylon Raiders by manipulating a switch on the game unit to direct their fire, triggered by a red button to the left of the unit.

In November 2003, shortly before the premiere of the re-imagined TV series, Sierra released a 3D space combat Battlestar Galactica computer game for the original Xbox, PlayStation 2, and PC. The game took place 40 years before the original series and featured an ensign Adama flying a Viper during the Cylon war. The game was developed by Warthog.

There is also a 2D Xbox 360 Live Arcade title called Battlestar Galactica wherein players can co-op or dogfight with up to 8 people over Xbox Live.

Battlestar Galactica Online was a 3D browser-based MMOG released as an open beta on February 8, 2011, by Bigpoint Games. Servers shutdown on February 1 2019.

Battlestar Galactica Deadlock is a 2017 3D turn based strategy game (released on PC, Xbox One and PS4) featuring the First Cylon War. The game is developed by Black Lab Games and published by the Slitherine Software.

Battlestar Galactica: Scattered Hopes is a 2026 roguelike strategy game developed by Alt Shift and published by Dotemu, where players must run away from Cylons to link up with Galactica.

=== Tabletop games ===
The original series inspired a Battlestar Galactica board game. The game is set during a training mission, where two to four players maneuver pieces representing Colonial Vipers to capture a damaged Cylon Raider. Play includes using terrain elements and a number of special-ability cards to the players' advantage.

In 1979, FASA released a tabletop counter piece game for Battlestar Galactica based on the fighter combat, which included the Galactica and a Cylon Basestar to be launched from, attack with and be attacked/defended. The counters for the Vipers and the Raiders included three model versions MKI/MKII/MKIII, not just the MKII Viper and Raider MKI.

Wiz Kids, Inc. (a collectible game manufacturer) produced the Battlestar Galactica Collectible Card Game based on the 2003 miniseries and 2004 TV show. The premier set of this game was released in May 2006. After the release of one expansion set, Wizkids cancelled the game on March 13, 2007.

A Battlestar Galactica role-playing game was released in August 2007 by Margaret Weis Productions at Gen Con.

In 2008 Fantasy Flight Games produced Battlestar Galactica: The Board Game, based on the 2003 re-imagined series. It is a semi-cooperative game of strategy for 3–6 players with some players being Cylon agents, either aware at start of the game or become aware later, as sleeper agents. Each of the 10 playable character has its own abilities and weaknesses, and they must all work together in order for humanity to survive, as well as attempt to expose the traitor while fuel shortages, food contaminations, and political unrest threaten to tear the fleet apart. The game had three expansions, Pegasus, Exodus and Daybreak.

In 2018, Ares Games released Battlestar Galactica: Starship Battles, a miniature game by Andrea Angiolino and Andrea Mainini simulating space duels between Vipers and Raiders, with expansions including further models. The game is based on the 2003 re-imagined series, but the license will also allow use of spaceships from the original series, with a game approach similar to Wings of War.

== Theme park attractions ==
Battle of Galactica opened June 9, 1979, as an event on the Studio Tour at Universal Studios Hollywood at a cost of $1 million, the most expensive special effects attraction ever built at the park at the time. This high-technology attraction featured animatronics and live actors in a spectacular laser battle based on the television series, with a 200-foot long spaceship that "swallowed" the passengers. This was the first themed attraction to feature Audio-Animatronics characters outside Disney Parks, and was the first dark ride to combine sophisticated animatronics and lasers with live actors. It was replaced in 1992 by the foundations of Back to the Future: The Ride.

A Battlestar Galactica: Human vs. Cylon roller coaster opened March 18, 2010, at Universal Studios Singapore.

== See also ==
- Battlestar Galactica comics
- Battlestar Galactica ship
- List of space science fiction franchises

== Bibliography ==
=== Academic books ===
- Eberl, Jason T., ed. (2008). Battlestar Galactica and Philosophy: Knowledge Here Begins Out There. Wiley. ISBN 9781444356571.
- Marshall, C. W.; Potter, Tiffany, eds. (2008). Cylons in America: Critical Studies in Battlestar Galactica. Bloomsbury Academic. ISBN 978-0826428486.
- Potter, Tiffany (2007). Cylons In America Critical Studies In Battlestar Galactica. Continuum. ISBN 978-0826428479.
- Steiff, Josef; Tamplin, Tristan D., eds. (2008). Battlestar Galactica and Philosophy: Mission Accomplished or Mission Frakked Up?. Open Court Publishing. ISBN 978-0812696431.
- Stoy, Jennifer; Kaveney, Roz, eds. (2010). Battlestar Galactica: Investigating Flesh, Spirit and Steel. I.B. Tauris. ISBN 9780857731098.
- Walsh, Karen M. (2019). Geek Heroines: An Encyclopedia of Female Heroes in Popular Culture. ABC-CLIO. ISBN 9781440866418.
- Wetmore, Kevin J. Jr. (2012). The Theology of Battlestar Galactica. McFarland & Company. ISBN 9780786489466.

=== Other books ===
- Mongé-Greer, Erica (2022). So Say We All: Religion, Spirituality, and the Divine in Battlestar Galactica. Wipf and Stock Publishers. p. 39. ISBN 9781725273368.
- Yeffeth, Glenn; Hatch, Richard; Morris, Tee, eds. (2006). So Say We All: An Unauthorized Collection of Thoughts and Opinions on Battlestar Galactica. BenBella Books. ISBN 978-1932100945.

=== Academic journal articles ===
- Fey, Marco; Poppe, Annika E; Rauch, Carsten (August 2016). "The Nuclear Taboo, Battlestar Galactica, and the Real World: Illustrations from a Science-Fiction Universe". Security Dialogue. 47 (4): 356. doi:10.1177/0967010616643212. S2CID 148059107.
- Henderson, Lesley; Carter, Simon (December 2016). "Doctors in Space (Ships): Biomedical Uncertainties and Medical Authority in Imagined Futures". Medical Humanities. 42 (4). London: 277–282. doi:10.1136/medhum-2016-010902. PMC 5256418. PMID 27694600.
- Klassen, Chris (2008). "Research Note: Rejecting Monotheism? Polytheism, Pluralism, and Battlestar Galactica". Journal of Contemporary Religion. 23 (3): 355–362. doi:10.1080/13537900802373205.
- Malley, Shawn (2014). "'Does All This Have to Happen Again?' Excavating Heritage in Battlestar Galactica". Science Fiction Film and Television. 7 (1). Liverpool University Press: 8–16. doi:10.3828/sfftv.2014.1. S2CID 191567994.
- McKagen, E. Leigh (2020). "Imagining Imperial Futures: Colonization as the Solution for Urban Uncertainty in Battlestar Galactica". Canadian Review of American Studies. 50 (3). University of Toronto Press: 418–421. doi:10.3138/cras-2020-003. S2CID 229356259.
- Pache, Corinne (2010). "'So Say We All'—Reimagining Empire and the Aeneid". The Classical Outlook. 87 (4): 132–136.
- Picarelli, Enrica; Gomez-Galisteo, M. Carmen (2013). "Be Fearful: The X-Files' Post-9/11 Legacy". Science Fiction Film and Television. 6 (1). Liverpool University Press: 79. doi:10.3828/sfftv.2013.7. S2CID 143858216.
- Randell, Karen (2011). "'Now the Gloves Come Off': The Problematic of 'Enhanced Interrogation Techniques' in Battlestar Galactica". Cinema Journal. 51 (1). Lawrence: 168–173. doi:10.1353/cj.2011.0066. S2CID 144986596.
- Ryman, Geoff (2007). "The Science Fiction Dream". Journal of the Fantastic in the Arts. 18 (2): 232–246. JSTOR 24350988.
- Sisson, Gretchen; Kimport, Katrina (December 2016). "Doctors and Witches, Conscience and Violence: Abortion Provision on American Television". Perspectives on Sexual and Reproductive Health. 48 (4): 165. doi:10.1363/psrh.1367. JSTOR 48576828. PMID 27685830.
