= Jack Stauffer =

American actor

Jack Stauffer (born December 3, 1945) is an American actor of film, television, and theater. He is also a director of theater productions.

== Career ==
Stauffer played the original Charles "Chuck" Tyler on the daytime soap opera All My Children from 1970 to 1973, and Bojay in the 1978–79 science fiction series Battlestar Galactica.

To date, Stauffer has guest starred on 60 different television shows (mini-series, regular series, and TV movies), "numerous" stage productions, and over 250 commercials.

== Filmography ==
=== Film ===
Year	Title	Role	Notes
1984	Chattanooga Choo Choo	Rex Richardson	Uncredited
1999	Battlestar Galactica: The Second Coming	Lieutenant Bojay	Short
2003	Galacticon	Lieutenant Bojay	

=== Television ===
Year	Title	Role	Notes
1970–1973	All My Children	Chuck Tyler	
1972	The ABC Comedy Hour	Alan King's Son	Episode: "If You Think Last Year Was Bad, Wait!"
1973	The ABC Afternoon Playbreak	David Laughton	Episode: "I Never Said Goodbye"
1974	The Partridge Family	George Parkington	Episode: "Keith and Lauriebelle"
1974, 1977	The Streets of San Francisco	Conrad / Bob Zahn	2 episodes
1975	Three for the Road	Councelor	Episode: "The Prisoner in Sneakers"
1975, 1976	Medical Story	Second Resident	2 episodes
1976	Eleanor and Franklin	Paul Leonard	2 episodes
1976	Harry O	Intern	Episode: "Hostage"
1976	Most Wanted	Intern	Episode: "Pilot"
1976	Days of Our Lives	Leo Rogers	Episode #1.2617
1976	The Bionic Woman	Phillips	Episode: "Canyon of Death"
1976	Mobile Medics	Doctor	Television film
1977	The Rockford Files	Brubaker	2 episodes
1977	The Fantastic Journey	Andy	Episode: "Vortex"
1977	Family	Ted Ahearne	Episode: "...More Things in Heaven and Earth"
1977	Police Story	Frey	Episode: "Trigger Point"
1977	Barnaby Jones	Jack Crandall	Episode: "Prisoner of Deceit"
1978–1979	Battlestar Galactica	Lieutenant/Captain Bojay	3 episodes
1979	How the West Was Won	David	Episode: "The Scavengers"
1979	Hawaii Five-O	Elliott Bancroft	Episode: "Use a Gun, Go to Hell"
1980	Alex and the Doberman Gang	Alexander 'Alex' Parker	Television film
1983	Emerald Point N.A.S.	Bill Benson	Episode #1.3
1986	Highway to Heaven	Myron	Episode: "That's Our Dad"
1986	Hotel	Martin Bill	Episode: "Undercurrents"
1986	Santa Barbara	Vice Cop	2 episodes
1986, 1988	Dynasty	Hotel Manager / Doctor	2 episodes
1987	Scarecrow and Mrs. King	Tommy	Episode: "Mission of Gold"
1988	Sonny Spoon	Tourist	Episode: "Diamonds Aren't Forever"
1989	Mancuso, F.B.I.	Director	Episode: "Betrayal"
1990	Jake and the Fatman	Brad	Episode: "I'll Dance at Your Wedding"
1990	The Bradys	Emergency Doctor	Episode: "The Brady 500"
1990	Perfect Strangers	Realtor	Episode: "This Old House"
1991	Out of This World	Homeless Man	Episode: "Marlowe Vice"
1991	Growing Pains	Swapping Passenger	Episode: "Maggie Seaver's: The Meaning of Life"
1991	DEA	Jack Rinaldi	Episode: "The Fat Lady Sings Alone"
1991	Knots Landing	Funeral Director	Episode: "The Gun Also Rises"
1991	Perfect Crimes	Policeman	Television film
1992	Quantum Leap	Flight Surgeon	Episode: "A Leap for Lisa"
1992	Designing Women	Croupier	Episode: "Viva Las Vegas"
1994	Viper	Phil	Episode: "Wheels of Fire"
1995	Lois & Clark: The New Adventures of Superman	Voss	Episode: "Super Mann"
1998	Melrose Place	Minister	Episode: "The Usual Santas"
