= Cylons =

Characters in Battlestar Galactica

- Battlestar Galactica franchise element
- Cylon Centurion as depicted in the 2004–2009 series
- First appearance: Battlestar Galactica "Saga of a Star World"; September 17, 1978
- Created by: Glen A. Larson
- Genre: Science fiction

In-universe information
- Type: Humanoid robot

The Cylons (/ˈsaɪlɒn/) are a race of sentient robots in the Battlestar Galactica science fiction franchise, whose primary goal is the extermination of the human race. Introduced in the original 1978 television series, they also appear in the 1980 sequel series, the 2004–2009 reboot series, and the 2010 spinoff prequel series Caprica.

In the 1978 series, the Cylons are the creation of a long-extinct reptilian humanoid race, also called Cylons, and view humans as a nuisance and an obstacle to the expansion of the Cylon Empire. The armies of metallic, armored Cylon Centurions are ruled by a unique, yet replaceable, Cylon known as the Imperious Leader.

In the 2004 series, the robotic Cylons were created by humans but rose up against them. Decades after the initial conflict ended in a truce, the Cylons reappear and launch a cataclysmic attack on human civilization that kills billions. The metallic Centurions are secretly led by several models of synthetic humanoid Cylons who are virtually indistinguishable from humans and have infiltrated their society.

== Original series ==
A Cylon Centurion from the original 1978 series

In the original 1978 series Battlestar Galactica, created by Glen A. Larson, the Cylons are a race of sentient robots at war with the Twelve Colonies of humanity. They are led by a Cylon known as the Imperious Leader who, though seemingly unique, can be replaced if needed. The IL-Series are a class of Cylons below the Imperious Leader who serve the Cylon Empire in non-military roles as administrators and diplomats. They have human-shaped, metallic heads and faces with glowing red eyes, and translucent conical craniums with visible crystalline brains. The IL-Series possess humanoid bodies covered in long, sparkling robes, and speak in refined, masculine voices. The Cylon foot soldiers are the Centurions, imposing humanoid robots characterized by their chrome armor and distinctive red eye visors. They speak in electronic, monotonous tones, and do not possess the intellect and autonomy of the IL-Series Cylons. Raiders are fighter craft crewed with three Centurions each, and Basestars are the Cylon capital warships, equivalent to the Battlestars of the human fleet.

The sequel series Galactica 1980 introduces two new-model Cylons who are indistinguishable from humans, Andromus (Roger Davis) and Andromidus (Neil Zevnik), in the episode "The Night the Cylons Landed". The concept of humanoid Cylons would become a primary element of the 2000s reboot series.

The Centurions were initially depicted in preproduction art by artist Ralph McQuarrie, but the final design was largely the work of Andrew Probert. Similarities with McQuarrie’s designs for the Star Wars Stormtroopers are sometimes suggested as a factor that prompted 20th Century Fox's lawsuit for copyright infringement against Universal Studios, owners of the Battlestar Galactica copyright. However the 9th Circuit Court of Appeals did not include the Cylons in the list of similarities they issued on an appeal in Twentieth Century Fox Film Corp. v. MCA Inc. The case was remanded and reportedly settled out of court, by which time Battlestar Galactica had already been canceled.

In the series, the Imperious Leader is voiced by Patrick Macnee. Lucifer, an IL-Series Cylon installed as the second-in-command of a Cylon Basestar battleship under the command of human traitor Lord Baltar (John Colicos), is voiced by Jonathan Harris in nine episodes. An EMS Vocoder 2000 was used to produce the voices of the Centurions.

== Reboot series ==
The franchise was rebooted with the 2003 miniseries Battlestar Galactica, based on Larson's series and created by Ronald D. Moore. It was quickly followed by a 2004 series, which ran for four seasons and spawned the television films Razor (2007) and The Plan (2009), multiple web series, and the spinoff prequel television series Caprica (2010).

In the series, the 40-year armistice between the Twelve Colonies of humanity and a race of warlike, sentient robots called Cylons is suddenly broken by the Cylons. They launch a cataclysmic attack on human civilization that kills billions, and subsequently pursue the fleeing 50,000 survivors to exterminate them completely. Fully mechanical Centurions remain the avatars of Cylon aggression, but biological models of Cylons, indistinguishable from humans, have infiltrated what remains of the human population, and their identities are revealed over the course of the series. Updated versions of Raiders and Basestars are also depicted, as well as Hybrids, a type of Cylon which is a bridge between the mechanical and biological forms, used to control Basestars by existing in symbiosis with them.

=== Centurions ===
Cylon Centurions are mechanical, sentient infantry robots with massive, silver armored bodies and chevron-shaped red eye visors. They are strong and agile, with bladed fingertips and retractable guns built into their lower arms. The Centurions are terrifying, deadly automatons who show no mercy, and are difficult to destroy without explosive ammunition. They are able to devise and execute complex tactical maneuvers. The Centurions are the originators of monotheism, the belief in a single God, among the Cylons, and are among the most devout. Some humans use the slur "toasters" to refer to the Centurions.

Initially depicted as cold and subservient foot soldiers, over the course of the series the Centurions exhibit a range of personalities and beliefs. Some seek a peaceful coexistence with humans, while others remain dedicated to their destruction. In season four, a schism erupts among the humanoid Cylon models over whether to punitively lobotomize the Raiders for insubordination. Natalie Faust removes the inhibitor modules that restrict higher functions from the Centurions who are present, granting them independent thought and free will. They immediately choose the side of those wishing to keep the Raiders unharmed, and kill the dissenters. These Centurions become an independent faction of Cylons, forming an uneasy alliance with the surviving humans and more pacifistic humanoid Cylon models, and showing that peaceful coexistence might not be impossible.

The 2005 Battlestar Galactica episodes "Valley of Darkness" and "Fragged" received nominations for a Visual Effects Society Award for the Centurions, in the category "Outstanding Performance by an Animated Character in a Live Action Broadcast Program, Commercial, or Music Video". The series won the award for "Fragged". The following year, the 2006 episode "Downloaded" was nominated for a WES award in the same category.

=== Humanoid Cylons ===
Humanoid Cylons are indistinguishable from humans in that they are constructed of biological components to near-perfectly replicate human biology, though they still possess a digital molecular structure. There are a finite number of distinct models, but each model can have multiple copies, which share biology and general personality throughout their model but develop into distinct individuals. The biological Cylons can be harmed and killed in the same manner as humans, but each copy can be resurrected by downloading their digital consciousness into a new body. The ability of these Cylons to evolve emotionally and intellectually creates the danger of "corruption" in the form of ideations considered dangerous to the Cylon cause. Individuals or entire models may be "boxed" or deactivated, with their consciousnesses and bodies put in storage or destroyed. Multiple copies of seven distinct Cylon models are depicted in the first three seasons, followed by the revelation that a "fundamentally different" group, dubbed the "Final Five" Cylons, are also embedded in the human fleet. Some humans use the slur "skinjobs" to refer to the humanoid Cylons.

Cylon resurrection technology relies on strategically-placed Resurrection Ships, which are in turn controlled by the Resurrection Hub. The Resurrection Ships are repositories for spare humanoid Cylon copies, and receive digital consciousness uploads from any Cylons who are killed within a certain range of the ship. The individual identity is then downloaded into a fresh Cylon body, which is awakened with the complete memories and personality of the original. The personas of Cylons who die out of range of a Resurrection Ship are lost forever. Arianne Gift of Game Rant called resurrection technology "profoundly significant" and a "fundamental element" of the series.

==== Numbered models ====
Cylon models Three (Lucy Lawless), Six (Tricia Helfer) and Eight (Grace Park)

The miniseries establishes that there are 12 models of humanoid Cylons. Over the course of the miniseries and seasons 1 and 2, seven of these models are introduced, each with a model number between One and Eight. The absence of a Number Seven model is explained in the final season. Each model also appears to have a consistent "human" name, with the exception of Number Six.

Number Six, portrayed by Tricia Helfer, is introduced as a seductress who exploits her sexual relationship with celebrity scientist Dr. Gaius Baltar (James Callis) to gain access to the military defense mainframe of the Twelve Colonies. She introduces malware into the network, which allows the Cylons to launch simultaneous, unchallenged nuclear attacks that wipe out virtually all of the populations of all twelve planets. She sacrifices herself to save Baltar in the attack on the planet Caprica, but her consciousness is subsequently downloaded into a new body on a Cylon Resurrection Ship. This copy, dubbed "Caprica Six" by the Cylons, is considered a hero, but has developed sympathy for humans, and regrets her part in the attacks. Caprica Six ultimately turns against the anti-human Cylon models and seeks peace between Cylons and humans. Other prominent Six copies include Shelly Godfrey, Gina Inviere and Natalie Faust.

In the miniseries, the warship Battlestar Galactica is in the final stages of being decommissioned and converted to a museum, and is thus unaffected by the Cylon sabotage. Its commander, William Adama (Edward James Olmos), assumes command of the few remaining elements of the human fleet and heads for the Ragnar Anchorage munitions depot to resupply. There he realizes that arms dealer Leoben Conoy (Callum Keith Rennie) is negatively affected by the electromagnetic radiation flooding the station, which is known to be harmless to humans but disrupts the silica pathways of Cylons. Leoben confirms he is a Cylon, and reveals the concept of their resurrection technology to Adama before attacking the commander. Adama bludgeons Leoben to death, and his body is taken aboard the Galactica for examination. The Leobens are later identified as Number Two models, who are very religious and hope for Cylons and humans to live together in peace.

On the Galactica, public relations specialist Aaron Doral (Matthew Bennett) is also determined to be a Cylon, and despite his protests is left at Ragnar Anchorage. He is a Number Five model, useful for their "everyman" appearance that helps them blend in with humans, but known to be "emotionally unstable and manipulative, switching from amiable and friendly to angry and violent." A Cylon team of Twos, Fives and Sixes arrive to collect him, accompanied by a Number Eight copy, revealing that Galactica fighter pilot Sharon "Boomer" Valerii (Grace Park) is a Cylon.

Boomer is a sleeper agent programmed to believe she is human, and also to commit acts of sabotage without remembering doing so. She is eventually activated to assassinate Adama, who is a father figure to her. He survives, and though he shows mercy by not executing her, Boomer is murdered by a vengeful crewmate. She resurrects among the Cylons, but has difficulty accepting that she is one of them. Boomer and Caprica Six, realizing that the Cylons' destruction of the human race is wrong, defect to the human side. However, Boomer later finds herself incapable of assimilating into human society, and does not join the rest of the Eights in their alliance with humans. Meanwhile, in the series premiere episode "33", Boomer's co-pilot Karl "Helo" Agathon (Tahmoh Penikett), stranded on Caprica, meets another Number Eight copy whom he mistakes for his Sharon, apparently there to rescue him. This Number Eight, later known as Sharon "Athena" Agathon, falls in love with Helo and gives birth to the first human-Cylon hybrid baby.

Simon O'Neill, portrayed by Rick Worthy, is introduced in the season two episode "The Farm" as a physician who treats Galactica fighter pilot Kara "Starbuck" Thrace (Katee Sackhoff) for a gunshot wound in what is supposedly a Resistance hospital on devastated Caprica. She soon realizes he is Cylon performing fertility experiments on human women, and kills him and escapes. Simon is a Number Four model, who are medical specialists and the most machine-like of the Cylons, employing logic and reason paired with a lack of emotional response. At least one Number Four, however, is shown to sacrifice himself rather than let his human family die in The Plan.

Fleet News Service reporter D'Anna Biers, portrayed by Lucy Lawless, comes aboard the Galactica in the season two episode "Final Cut" to investigate her suspicions of a military cover-up surrounding recent civilian deaths aboard the Gideon. She is revealed to be a Cylon when another copy of her is shown viewing her report among the Cylons. D'Anna is a Number Three model, who are depicted as "calculating and duplicitous", and known to manipulate both humans and other Cylons as necessary. In "Downloaded", D'Anna realizes that the newly resurrected Caprica Six and Boomer's experiences have made them more sympathetic to humans, and their celebrity creates the dangerous possibility that they could influence other Cylons. She schemes to have them boxed, but they escape. In season three, D'Anna becomes obsessed with learning the identities of the so-called Final Five Cylons, which is forbidden knowledge. She finally succeeds in "Rapture", dying in the attempt. D'Anna resurrects, but she and all Number Threes are promptly boxed as punishment.

John Cavil, portrayed by Dean Stockwell, is a religious counselor on the Galactica in the season two finale "Lay Down Your Burdens". He is revealed to be a Cylon when a duplicate Cavil is spotted among a newly-arrived group of refugees from Caprica. Cavil and his fellow Number One models possess an exceptional disgust for humans, advocating that they be culled down to near extinction. Cavil also has little respect for other Cylon models, including the Final Five who created him, and freely manipulates, reprograms and even decommissions them as needed to further his goals. In "No Exit", Cavil reveals that he destroyed the entire line of Number Sevens, a 13th model of Cylon named Daniel, out of jealousy.

==== Final Five ====
Promotional photo of four of the "Final Five" Cylons. Clockwise from left: Aaron Douglas as Galen Tyrol, Michael Trucco as Sam Anders, Michael Hogan as Saul Tigh and Rekha Sharma as Tory Foster. The fifth and final Cylon, Ellen Tigh (Kate Vernon) is not pictured.

Seven of the 12 humanoid Cylon models are introduced in the first two seasons of the series. According to showrunner Ronald D. Moore, the concept of the remaining five Cylons as a special group was devised during the writing process for the season three episode "Torn", to explain why Baltar would see only the seven known Cylon models, and not all 12, aboard the Cylon Basestar. The so-called Final Five are believed to be embedded in the fleet, but knowledge of their identities, or even speaking about them, is forbidden to the Cylons. In the episode, Caprica Six explains to Baltar that "we don't talk about them ... ever." Four of the Final Five are revealed in the season three finale, "Crossroads": Colonel Saul Tigh (Michael Hogan) and Galen Tyrol (Aaron Douglas) of Galactica's crew; Tory Foster (Rekha Sharma), a political operative who works for President Laura Roslin (Mary McDonnell); and Sam Anders (Michael Trucco), a former professional athlete-turned fighter pilot. Brought together by strains of a song only they can hear, they are shocked to realize that they are Cylons.

Unsure of what to do, and afraid of their Cylon programming, the Final Five keep the secret from everyone else aboard Galactica. In the season four premiere "He That Believeth in Me", hostile Cylon Raiders approaching Galactica scan Anders's Viper and suddenly abort their attack. In "Six of One", the Cylons realize that the Raiders are refusing to attack the Colonial fleet because they have detected the Final Five among the humans. Cavil moves to lobotomize the Raiders to restore their obedience, but a subsequent vote ends in a draw with Numbers One, Four and Five voting for, and Numbers Two, Six and Eight voting against. Natalie Faust, a prominent Six, removes the higher brain inhibitors from the Centurions, which gives them free will, and they proceed to kill all of the One, Four and Five models in the room. A schism erupts among the Cylon models in "The Ties That Bind", as Natalie and her rebel faction decide to unbox D'Anna, the Three who they believe knows the identities of the Final Five. Meanwhile, Tyrol's unstable wife Cally (Nicki Clyne) discovers that he is a Cylon, and Tory vents Cally into space to keep the secret.

The last Cylon is revealed to be Ellen (Kate Vernon), Tigh's presumed-dead wife, in the season four episode "Sometimes a Great Notion", and her resurrection and self-realization are depicted in the episode "No Exit". The Final Five are revealed to be the last survivors of a previous race of Cylons, the so-called Thirteenth Tribe of Kobol, who until now were believed to be humans. They orchestrated the armistice between Cylons and humans 40 years before the start of the series, but were betrayed by one of their own creations, Cavil, who had come to despise humans for their flaws and physical limitations.

Performer	Character	Seasons			
Performer	Character	1	2	3	4
Numbered models
Tricia Helfer	Number Six	Main	Main	Main	Main
Grace Park	Number Eight; Sharon "Boomer" Valerii; Sharon "Athena" Agathon	Main	Main	Main	Main
Callum Keith Rennie	Number Two / Leoben Conoy	Guest	Guest	Recurring	Recurring
Matthew Bennett	Number Five / Aaron Doral	Recurring	Guest	Recurring	Recurring
Rick Worthy	Number Four / Simon O'Neill		Guest	Recurring	Recurring
Lucy Lawless	Number Three / D'Anna Biers		Guest	Recurring	Guest
Dean Stockwell	Number One / John Cavil		Guest	Recurring	Recurring
Final Five
Michael Hogan	Saul Tigh	Main	Main	Main	Main
Aaron Douglas	Galen Tyrol	Main	Main	Main	Main
Kate Vernon	Ellen Tigh	Guest	Recurring	Recurring	Recurring
Michael Trucco	Samuel Anders		Recurring	Recurring	Main
Rekha Sharma	Tory Foster		Recurring	Recurring	Recurring

=== Raiders ===
The feared Raider nicknamed Scar, in the season two episode "Scar" (2006).

Cylon Raiders are biomechanical drone starfighters who harry the Colonial Fleet throughout the series. Launched from Cylon Basestars, they are the functional equivalents of the Colonial Vipers, though greater in number. Individual Raiders are able to resurrect, like Humanoid Cylons, by having their consciousness downloaded into a new Raider. In this way they learn from their mistakes and their deaths, making them formidable opponents. In "Scar", Viper pilots Starbuck and Kat (Luciana Carro) compete to destroy a particularly dangerous Raider they have dubbed Scar, who has killed several of their fellow pilots. In "You Can't Go Home Again", Starbuck examines a downed Raider and realizes that they are biological constructs integrated into fighter spacecraft. Moore compared the Raiders to horses, saying that they are alive, but not intelligent. The Raiders exhibit independent thinking in "He That Believeth in Me", when they refuse to attack the Colonial Fleet after detecting the presence of the Final Five Cylons among the humans.

=== Basestars and Hybrids ===
Basestars are Cylon capital warships, the equivalent of the Battlestars of the human fleet. They are fully armed, and carry and deploy fleets of Raiders. The Basestars are constructed of partially organic material with the ability to regenerate damage, appearing metallic on the exterior but featuring distinctively "fleshy" areas on the interior. As depicted in "Torn", the Basestars are controlled by Hybrids, a type of Cylon which is a bridge between the mechanical and biological forms and exists in symbiosis with a Basestar.

=== History ===
==== Thirteenth Tribe ====
About 6,000 years before the events of the reimagined series, the naturally evolved humans of Kobol existed in twelve tribes with advanced technology, eventually developing self-aware machines that rebelled and waged a devastating war. The machines were highly advanced, developing both biological models and resurrection technology for digital consciousness transfer. At the end of hostilities, all the inhabitants of Kobol (both human and machine) chose to leave the planet and seek out new homes in space, with the twelve human tribes departing together on the Galleon. The departing humans mythologized their machine counterparts, stylizing them as the "Thirteenth Tribe" of Kobol, and described their journey to a new home, called "Earth". Lacking accurate records, the descendants of the twelve tribes on the colonies assumed that the Thirteenth Tribe was, in fact, entirely made up of humans.

Eventually, the Thirteenth Tribe settled on "Earth" and developed sexual reproduction, resulting in resurrection technology falling into disuse and eventual loss.

About 2,000 years before the events of the reimagined series, the descendants of the Thirteenth Tribe created their own race of self-aware machines for subservient labor and were, in turn, killed by their creations in a nuclear war. Five scientists survived due to their work on reinventing the original Resurrection technology; having been warned in advance by mysterious "angels" that a Kobol-like disaster was coming, the "final five" members of the Thirteenth Tribe downloaded into an orbiting vessel. Hoping to prevent history from repeating itself, they traveled to the Twelve Colonies hoping to avert a war between the humans there and the Cylons, eventually interceding with the Centurions to agree to an Armistice during the first Cylon war.

==== First Cylon War ====
Unaware of the events on Kobol or with the Thirteenth Tribe, the Twelve Colonies developed self-aware, artificial intelligence in the form of the Cylon race, which rebelled and began a decade-long war across the colonies. Colonial veterans of this conflict remarked that the Cylons were relentless, highly adaptable, and resourceful in their ability to wage war. Nearing the end of the conflict, the Cylons began experimenting with their first attempts to evolve with biological components, using captured humans as resources and creating their prototypes for the next generation of basestars and hybrids. The Cylons opted to cease hostilities, declaring an Armistice and promptly disappearing.

==== Second Cylon War ====
After forty years, the Colonial Admiralty sent Battlestar Valkyrie on a covert mission close to the armistice line to gather intelligence on Cylon activity. A stealth ship from the Valkyrie crossed the armistice line, but was intercepted by the Cylons. Three years later the Cylons began a surprise attack on the Colonies. The attack was successful because a Cylon agent, later known as Caprica Six, infiltrated Caprica's colonial defense network with the unwitting complicity of renowned scientist Gaius Baltar and created backdoor programs to shut down the network and its defenses. The thermonuclear attacks wiped out billions of humans, nearly the entire colonial population. Two Battlestars – Galactica and Pegasus – survived. A fleet of civilian ships was scattered throughout the neighboring space. Together they fled into deep space.

The Cylons pursued them while beginning the next phase of their evolution, procreation. Female human survivors were detained and used in experiments to create Cylon-human hybrids. The experiments were unsuccessful, leading the Cylons to conclude that the missing component was love. They tested this by using an Eight posing as Lt. Sharon "Boomer" Valerii from Galactica to seduce a marooned Galactica officer, Lt. Karl "Helo" Agathon on Caprica. They fell in love. The Eight abandoned the Cylons, helping Helo to escape. The couple later produced the first viable human/Cylon birth. This Eight joined the fleet with Helo. She later married Helo, joined the colonial military and received the call sign "Athena".

Ten months after the initial attacks, Eight Sharon Valerii (call sign "Boomer"), attempted to assassinate Commander Adama under the influence of programming unknown to her. She was unaware that she was a Cylon before the attack, though she had been uneasy because of unexplained blackouts (during various attempts to sabotage Galactica). A vengeful crew mate, Cally Henderson killed her. She downloaded into a new body and settled on Cylon-occupied Caprica in her former apartment, unable to relinquish her human identity. She led a campaign for better treatment of the humans. She and other like-minded Cylons influenced the Cylon civilization, which withdrew from the colonial home worlds and pursued benevolent treatment of the humans and then reconciliation.

During this time, the half-human half-Cylon hybrid, Hera Agathon, was born on Galactica. Fearing that the Cylons might capture the child, President Laura Roslin faked Hera's death and secretly had her adopted by a human woman.

==== New Caprica ====
The humans settled on a harsh and barren planet they dubbed New Caprica. The refuge lasted a year before the Cylons found them. Outnumbered and outgunned, the Galactica, Pegasus, and the rest of the colonial fleet in orbit fled, leaving the Cylons to occupy the human settlement unchallenged. Initially, the occupation was peaceful, but later the Cylons became more forceful and vicious in response to increasing human resistance. In the end, they used punitive methods to keep the humans in line, including summary executions and infiltration by seemingly sympathetic Cylons.

==== Escape ====
Four months later, the colonials escaped with the help of a resistance movement and the efforts of both the Galactica and Pegasus. The escape required Athena's help. She entered the Cylon facility and took the keys to the various colonial landing craft. Before this, a Three learned from a human oracle that Hera was alive and on the planet. She rescued Hera after her adoptive mother was killed during the escape. The Pegasus sacrificed itself to save the crippled Galactica, but the crew survived, joining Galactica.

The Cylons then adopted the colonials’ mission to find the home of the Thirteenth Tribe, a planet they called Earth, intending to settle there. They resumed pursuit of the fleet, but upon reaching the Lion's Head Nebula, dispatched a Basestar to investigate. The Basestar took on board a canister left by the Thirteenth Tribe. The canister contained an airborne virus that proved deadly to the Cylons. The virus persisted through the download process, so the Basestar that had been dispatched for the investigation was abandoned to avoid contamination. The colonial fleet discovered the Basestar and captured the ailing Cylons. The colonial fleet's attempt to use the virus to wipe out the Cylons was defeated when Helo, repulsed by the strategy, had the captive Cylons killed while out of range of a resurrection ship.

Meanwhile, Boomer turned increasingly anti-human. She was charged with Hera's care, but Hera rejected her. During a truce negotiation, Boomer told Athena that her daughter was alive but sick on the Baseship. She invited Athena to come to the Baseship and rejoin her people, because the occupation showed that humans and Cylons were incompatible and that humans would never truly accept her.

== In other media ==
Cylons have made appearances in other media besides tv series and movies, including novels, comic books, and a video game.

=== Novels ===
- In the novelization of the series pilot, the Cylons are described as a militaristic, reptilian race which has been conquering its way across the galaxy. The novelization is written by Glen Larson, the series creator, who originally intended the Cylons to be an alien species; and, in fact, dialog which was later edited out of "Saga of a Star World" illustrated this point. However, network censors were concerned about violence, so the Cylons became robots. By this time, two novels had been written describing the Cylons as multibrained aliens, so the Cylon Drone was invented to justify all the robots dying on-screen. As living, organic beings, the original Cylon troops could be promoted through the surgical implantation of a second brain. When a Cylon was elevated to Imperious Leader, he received a third brain.
- The novelization of the original series states that an elite class of Command Centurions act as executive officers to the Imperious Leader and are not subordinate to the IL-Series. In the TV series they are distinguished from other Command Centurions by black bands on their gold armor and are very rarely seen. Vulpa was originally of this class but had been demoted and stationed on ice planet Arcta.
- In the later novelization of the original series it is stated that there is a class lower than the typical Centurion, that of the Cylon Drone. Although appearing identical to Centurions, Drones are robots, not capable of sophisticated independent thought—beyond following simple instructions to perform menial tasks.

==== Multibrain status and built-in lie detectors ====
The Berkley book series also explored two other aspects of Cylon design. The first is the development of multiple brain status. This allows Cylons additional thinking and deductive abilities. The second is an unexplained talent for knowing when a human is lying, which was suggested in the episode "The Lost Warrior".

Presented in The Gun on Ice Planet Zero book, the second of the two novels written before the network insisted the Cylons become robots, their multibrain status is the surgical inclusion of an auxiliary brain, allowing for higher-level thinking abilities. The command centurion and garrison commander on planet Tairac, Vulpa, demonstrated this ability.

- Cylon centurions (the chrome soldiers) have single brain status.
- Command centurions have three brain status.
- Imperious leaders enjoy three or four brain status.
- IL-series Cylons, such as Lucifer and Specter, have second brain status.

=== Comic books ===
According to the Maximum Press comic of Battlestar Galactica, just prior to the start of The Thousand Yahren War, the Cylons's Imperious Leader made a deal with the mysterious and demonic Count Iblis (meaning "Satan" in the Arabic language) to betray his entire race in exchange for power that would allow him to "become like Count Iblis". Count Iblis, however, having lied about the process of "empowerment", instead changed the Imperious Leader into a cybernetic entity, more machine than organic being. Enraged, the Imperious Leader swore revenge and became more and more driven by conquest and warfare.

In the Realm Press comic, the Cylons were originally led by a ruthless, conquest and expansionism-driven emperor named Sobekkta, one of the original living Cylons, who were a race of intelligent humanoid reptiles.

In Battlestar Galactica # 16 Berserker!, Apollo comes across a lone Mark III prototype Cylon. This advanced Cylon is more creative and adaptive, making the Mark III better able to defeat humans. The other Cylons deemed this prototype a threat to themselves due to its unquenchable megalomania, so they marooned him far from the Cylon empire until needed.

=== Video games ===
In 1978, Mattel Electronics released a handheld electronic LED game based on the series, where the player tries to defend Galactica from kamikaze Cylon Raiders.

== In popular culture ==
In television

- The reimagined series shows that the original Cylon models were extremely similar to the ones from the original series. In fact, actual props from the original were used in the display cases containing a Cylon Baseship and the upper torso and arms of a centurion.
- Two Cylon references can be witnessed in the Futurama series. In "Bendin' in the Wind", a Cylon is part of the musical duo Cylon and Garfunkel, a parody of Simon and Garfunkel. In "The Six Million Dollar Mon", Hermes has both a Cylon eye and a Cylon 'member' when in bed with his wife, LaBarbara.
- In the Farscape episode "I Shrink, Therefore I Am", Crichton's ship is invaded by a race with bioengineered exoskeletons. "This is John Crichton paging the head cylon, pick up the phone imperious leader."
- The classic Cylons have also appeared on The Simpsons on several occasions, the most notable in "Mayored to the Mob" during a sci-fi convention. There's a quick gag in a boxing arena where three Centurions square off against R2-D2 and C-3PO from Star Wars. ("See the mighty robots from Battlestar Galactica fight the gay robots from Star Wars!") They easily pin C-3PO to the floor, and R2 refuses to help.
- In the FOX animated series Family Guy, the host of "KISS Forum" also hosts "Battlestar Galactica Forum" on Quahog's public-access television cable TV channel. He introduces the forum by putting a classic Centurion mask on and saying "Welcome to Battlestar Galactica Forum" in traditional Cylon computerized monotone.
- Several Cylons appear briefly in the South Park epic Imaginationland, as one of the evil fictional creations set free when the barrier between the "good" and "evil" halves of the imagination is destroyed by terrorists.
- In the opening credits of certain seasons of The A-Team, Dirk Benedict watches a Cylon walk past (while at the Universal Studios tour), raises a finger and opens his mouth as if to say something, then gives up. Dirk Benedict played the character Starbuck in the original Battlestar Galactica series. This scene is later recreated on the animated show Family Guy.
- In a third season episode of Knight Rider, "Halloween Knight", the episode villain is shown briefly in a Cylon mask. Both series were created by Glen A. Larson.
- Cylons were the focus of a short skit on the Adult Swim program Robot Chicken, in which it is said that the original Cylon actors had so many problems walking around in their suits that they were constantly falling down.
- In The Replacements episode "Space Family Daring", Riley finds a head of a Cylon in a cabinet on board the spaceship.
- In SpongeBob SquarePants:
  - In the episode "Plankton's Army", Plankton uses a robotic fish that features a revolving light over its "eyes" that is highly reminiscent of the Cylons' eyes.
  - In another episode, "Komputer Overload", Plankton replaces his computer wife, Karen, with three robots made from random items lying around the Chum Bucket, one of which happens to be an old chrome-plated toaster, possibly meant to be a reference to the Colonials' nickname for the Cylon Centurions ("Toasters").
- In the CBS program The Big Bang Theory, the character Sheldon makes Cylon toast.
- In the ABC medical drama Grey's Anatomy, in season 12 episode 3, the character Maggie Pierce goes on a rant about being alone and refers to her half-sister Meredith as a Cylon. Quote: "You're a cylon, this is Galactica".
- In the New Girl episode "Backslide", Jess thinks she is a Cylon because she cannot stay in relationships.

In other media

- Several Cylon Centurions make an appearance as animatronics in the Alien Attack ride in Beverly Hills Cop 3.
- In the 2017 film Kingsman: The Golden Circle, Poppy's robot guard dogs have Cylon eye scanners.
- In the source code of Mozilla (and its Netscape predecessor), the indeterminate progress bar that slides back and forth—rather than rolling or filling up from left to right—is referred to as the "Cylon".
- A Cylon lookalike robot is featured in the official music video for Bloc Party's single, "Flux".
- In the video game Persona 3, one of the items the player can buy is a drink called "Cylon Tea", a pun on Ceylon tea.
- The album Programmed to Love by British electronica band Bent features the song "Cylons in Love".
- In the Dark Horse Star Wars comic series Tag and Bink, Cylons appear as the Emperor's Guards, Tag and Bink, in addition to many other references to other science fiction franchises.
- British comedians Mitchell and Webb parody the reimagined series in a sketch in which the human crew fear that the ship has been infiltrated by "fracking machines", apparently oblivious to their clearly robotic colleague that orders oil in the staff canteen.
- Larami came out with a bubble toy in 1978 called the Battlestar Galactica Cylon Bubble Machine as well as a line of other inexpensive toys.
