= Galactica 1980 =

American sci-fi TV series (1980)

- Galactica 1980 intro
- Genre: Science fiction; Space opera; Action adventure
- Created by: Glen A. Larson
- Starring: Lorne Greene; Kent McCord; Barry Van Dyke
- Opening theme: "Theme from Battlestar Galactica" by Stu Phillips
- Composers: Stu Phillips; John Andrew Tartaglia
- Country of origin: United States
- No. of episodes: 10 (list of episodes)

Production
- Production locations: Los Angeles, California, U.S.
- Running time: c. 45 mins
- Production companies: Glen A. Larson Productions; Universal Television

Original release
- Network: ABC
- Release: January 27 – May 4, 1980

Related
- Battlestar Galactica

Galactica 1980 is an American science fiction television series, which served as a continuation of the original Battlestar Galactica television series (1978–79). It was first broadcast on ABC in the United States from January 27 to May 4, 1980, lasting for 10 episodes. Set 30 years after the original series, it follows the crew of the Galactica on a contemporary Earth as they try to protect the relatively-primitive planet from their enemies, the Cylons.

The series was born out of the cancellation of the original Battlestar Galactica. Following a letter-writing fan campaign, ABC sought to revive the series, but to lower its production costs as well as appeal to a younger audience. Lorne Greene and Herbert Jefferson Jr. were the only returning principal cast members, while the rest were replaced by new characters. These changes were poorly received by both critics and audiences, and the series was cancelled after one season.

== Series overview ==
Season	Episodes	Originally released	
Season	Episodes	First released	Last released
Battlestar Galactica	24 (Note: The series consist of a three-hour pilot movie "Saga of a Star World" plus 21 episodes. The pilot movie was split into three one-hour episodes for syndication.)	September 17, 1978	April 29, 1979
Galactica 1980	10	January 27, 1980	May 4, 1980

Set during the year 1980, and a generation after the original series, the Galactica and its fleet of 220 civilian ships have finally discovered Earth, only to find that its people are not as scientifically advanced and that the planet can neither defend itself against the Cylons nor help the Galactica as originally hoped. Therefore, teams of Colonial warriors are covertly sent to the planet to work incognito with various members of the scientific community, hoping to advance Earth's technology.

Commander Adama on the advice of Doctor Zee, a teenage prodigy serving as Adama's counsellor, sends Captain Troy (previously known as Boxey), who is the adopted son of Adama's own son Apollo, and Lieutenant Dillon to North America, where they become entangled with TV journalist Jamie Hamilton. After an initial time travel adventure to Nazi Germany in the 1940s (to stop rebel Galactican Commander Xavier, trying to change the future to improve Earth's technology level), the three friends devise ways to help Earth's scientists and outwit the Cylons in the present day. Meanwhile, Adama sends a group of children from the Galactica fleet (the Super Scouts) to Earth in order to begin the process of integrating with the population. However, due to differences in gravity and physiology, the children must deal with the fact they have nearly super-human powers on Earth.

The tenth and final episode, "The Return of Starbuck," uses the 1980 setting as a framing device for a story regarding Starbuck on a deserted planet.

The fates of several characters from the original series are explained during the course of the series. Apollo is apparently dead (or retired), the cause of his seeming disappearance not addressed. Starbuck was marooned on a desert planet, although the script for an unfilmed episode "The Wheel of Fire" indicated that Starbuck was eventually rescued from the planet by the inhabitants of the Ships of Light and became one of their inhabitants. Captain Troy is revealed to be Boxey, and Lt. Boomer has risen to the rank of Colonel and has become Adama's second in command. The fates of several other characters, including Adama's daughter Lieutenant Athena, Colonel Tigh, Lieutenant Sheba, Starbuck's girlfriend Cassiopeia, and Muffit the daggit (robot dog) are not revealed. These characters are absent from the second series, however several "other" daggits are seen playing with children on one of the Colonial ships during the opening scenes of the series' first episode.

== Cast and characters ==
- Lorne Greene as Commander Adama
- Herb Jefferson Jr. as Colonel Boomer
- Kent McCord as Captain Troy
- Barry Van Dyke as Lieutenant Dillon
- Robyn Douglass as Jamie Hamilton
- Richard Lynch (Episodes 1-3) and Jeremy Brett (Episode 6) as Commander Xaviar
- Allan Miller as Colonel Jack Sydell
- Robbie Rist (Episodes 1–3) and James Patrick Stuart (Episodes 4-10) as Dr. Zee

== Development and production ==
A massive write-in campaign began upon the cancellation of the original Battlestar Galactica. Because letter writing campaigns in favor of restoring cancelled television programs were uncommon in 1979, it prompted ABC to re-think their reasons for canceling the show. After some deliberation, they contacted Glen A. Larson to see about reviving the series, albeit in some modified and less expensive format.

Both Larson and the network felt the show needed some major change of focus to relaunch it as a spin-off, and Larson and Donald P. Bellisario decided to set the new series five years after "The Hand of God", the final episode of the original series. This would allow them to weed out many supporting characters who were now considered superfluous, including Colonel Tigh and Cassiopeia, which would bring down production costs. The only major characters to return from the original series would be Commander Adama, Colonel Boomer (replacing Tigh), Apollo, Starbuck and Lord Baltar. Baltar was to have made atonement for betraying the Colonies to the Cylons, and was now the President of the Council of Twelve.

Upon discovering a "present-day" Earth completely unable to defend itself from the Cylons, Adama decided to just head off into deep space to lead the Cylons away from the planet, but Baltar suggested using time travel technology to alter Earth's history so its technology would develop more rapidly up to a Colonial level. The Council votes this suggestion down, so Baltar steals a ship capable of time-travel and heads into Earth's past to carry out his plan anyway. After some deliberation, Starbuck and Apollo are sent after him to bring him back or at least undo his changes to history. Episodes would feature a new "Time Mission" every week, generally with Apollo at some different time in the past, and Starbuck flying back and forth between "Now" and "Then" to give information and support to Apollo. ABC approved this pitch, and gave the approval to develop a pilot for the series.

However, Dirk Benedict (Starbuck in the original series) was unavailable at the time of filming. Richard Hatch (Apollo in the original series) was sent a script for Galactica 1980, but turned it down since he wasn't sure what his part in the series would be now that all the characters had changed. It was then decided the series would take place thirty years after the end of the original series, and that Boxey would be renamed Troy and take Apollo's role, while a character named Lt. Dillon would take over the Starbuck part. President Baltar was written out entirely, and Commander Xavier or Doctor Xavier was created to take up his role as the villain.

The premise of setting the series thirty years after the original series created a plot hole in that the original series ended with a video transmission being picked up by the Galactica from the Apollo 11 Moon landing (July 20th, 1969), meaning that the original series would have to have taken place sometime after 1969 by Earth's calendar. A thirty-year journey would mean that the Colonial Fleet could not have possibly reached Earth until the turn of the 21st Century rather than in 1980.

After the pilot was completed, the network was unhappy with the time travel aspects of the story, which was intended to be an ongoing premise in each episode as the Colonials chased Xavier through different periods in Earth's history. They agreed to pick up the series only if the time-travel element was dropped. Larson and Bellisario reluctantly agreed, and the series instead became focused on Troy's and Dillon's attempts to protect some Colonial children on Earth.

== Cancellation ==
The program was poorly received during its run, both due to plot elements as well as the series time slot. Within the plot, Commander Adama is now shown as a very weak leader, often at a loss as to how to proceed and frequently turning to Dr. Zee for advice. Zee in turn, who is a young teen boy, at times even gives Adama direct orders and appears to actually be the one in charge. The casting for Dillon and Troy was also a detriment to the show, since the characters were clearly intended to be "look-alikes" to Starbuck and Apollo, with many of the scripts even written for these original characters. This use of look-alike characters was similar to the casting of Coy and Vance Duke in the series The Dukes of Hazzard, which caused problems for that show as well.

The series also suffered low ratings because the show was aired at a time slot otherwise reserved for either child-friendly-based, informational, educational, or news-related programming (Sunday, 7:00 PM/6:00 PM Central), and was cancelled after ten episodes, many of which were multi-part stories. The final episode shown was "The Return of Starbuck", which featured a guest appearance by Dirk Benedict from the original series. Larson even began to develop a sequel to this episode, but the series was cancelled during production of episode 11, "The Day They Kidnapped Cleopatra", which remained unfinished.

== Syndication and beyond ==
The ten Galactica 1980 episodes were rolled into the television syndication package for Battlestar Galactica and were given the same title as its parent program.

Following the program's cancellation, a feature film titled Conquest of the Earth was stitched together from sections of the three "Galactica Discovers Earth" episodes and the two "The Night the Cylons Landed" episodes. A scene of John Colicos as Baltar was also spliced into this release. The latter footage was actually taken from an episode of the original series (Baltar makes no appearances in any Galactica 1980 episodes) and is partially dubbed, so as to make the speech sound relevant to the Galactica's new situation. Several early scenes involving Adama and Dr. Zee are also partially dubbed, to add more explanatory detail and to explain why two actors appear playing the role of Dr. Zee. The feature was released in cinemas in Europe, New Zealand and Australia and on home video elsewhere.

== Home media ==
On December 23, 2007, Universal released all of the Galactica 1980 episodes on DVD in a 2-disc set. This release is touted as "The Original Battlestar Galactica's Final Season".

== Comic series ==
In August 2009, Dynamite Entertainment released a Galactica 1980 comic series. It was written by Marc Guggenheim and is a re-imagining of the original series.
