= List of Battlestar Galactica (1978 TV series) and Galactica 1980 characters =

Promotional photo of the cast of Battlestar Galactica (1978). From left to right: Tony Swartz as Jolly, Herbert Jefferson Jr. as Boomer, Anne Lockhart as Sheba, Lorne Greene as Adama, Maren Jensen as Athena, Richard Hatch as Apollo, Laurette Spang as Cassiopeia and Dirk Benedict as Starbuck.

Battlestar Galactica is an American science fiction television series created by Glen A. Larson that aired on the ABC network from September 17, 1978, to April 29, 1979. It stars an ensemble cast led by Richard Hatch, Dirk Benedict and Lorne Greene. Canceled after 24 episodes, the series was revived as Galactica 1980, which aired for 10 episodes from January 27 to May 4, 1980, and featured only Greene and Herbert Jefferson Jr. from the original series cast.

Battlestar Galactica follows a group of human survivors fleeing the destruction of their homeworlds aboard the titular spacecraft, searching for a new home while being pursued by the Cylons, a fearsome society of robots intent on exterminating all humans. In Galactica 1980, set 30 years later, the fleet finds contemporary Earth with the Cylons still in pursuit.

The Battlestar Galactica franchise was rebooted on the Sci-Fi Channel with a 2003 miniseries and a 2004–2009 series, using new incarnations of some characters from the original series and inventing others.

== Battlestar Galactica (1978–1979) ==
=== Main ===
==== Captain Apollo ====
Captain Apollo, portrayed by Richard Hatch, is a Viper starfighter pilot on the Battlestar Galactica, the son of Commander Adama and brother of Lieutenant Athena. The leader of Blue Squadron, Apollo is typically partnered with his best friend, Lieutenant Starbuck. Early in the series, Apollo marries reporter-turned-Viper pilot Serina, but she is killed by Cylons, and Apollo adopts her young son, Boxey.

Lee Adama (call sign "Apollo"), portrayed by Jamie Bamber, is a reimagined version of Captain Apollo in the 2003 miniseries and 2004–2009 series. Hatch played a different recurring character, Tom Zarek, in the reboot series.

==== Lieutenant Starbuck ====
Lieutenant Starbuck, portrayed by Dirk Benedict, is Apollo's charismatic best friend, a skilled Viper pilot known for gambling and womanizing. Over the course of the series, he develops a romantic relationship with Cassiopeia. In "The Man with Nine Lives", Starbuck comes to believe that con man Chameleon, who needs the pilot's help to evade revenge-seeking Borellians, may be his father.

TV Guide ranked Starbuck # 21 on its "25 Greatest Sci-Fi Legends of All Time" list.

Kara Thrace (call sign "Starbuck"), portrayed by Katee Sackhoff, is a gender-swapped version of Lieutenant Starbuck in the 2003 miniseries and 2004–2009 series.

==== Commander Adama ====
Commander Adama, portrayed by Lorne Greene, is the commander of the Battlestar Galactica and the refugee human fleet, and the father of Apollo and Athena. A religious man, he is also the spiritual leader of the surviving colonists, and leads the quest for the fabled planet Earth. Adama is suspicious of the offer of armistice by the Cylons, a fearsome society of robots with whom the Twelve Colonies have been at war for a thousand years. He is the only battlestar commander to keep his ship on battle-stations drill, and as a result, the Galactica is the only battlestar to survive the Cylon sneak attack. Both his wife, Ila, and youngest son, Zac, are killed in the attack.

William Adama, portrayed by Edward James Olmos, is a reimagined version of Commander Adama in the 2003 miniseries and 2004–2009 series.

==== Lord Baltar ====
Lord Baltar, (Note: Baltar is called "Count Baltar" in the pilot episode only.) portrayed by John Colicos, is a member of the Council of Twelve, a quorum of representatives from the Twelve Colonies. Humanity has been at war against the Cylons for a thousand years, and Baltar comes to the council with an offer of peace from the Cylons. In truth, he has promised to aid them in destroying most of the human race in exchange for them sparing his own colony, plotting to rule as dictator with the Cylons as his enforcers. The Cylons, however, are intent on exterminating all humans. They fail to honor their arrangement and destroy all twelve colonies. A protesting Baltar is sentenced to death, but is granted a reprieve by the Cylon Imperious Leader, who realizes Baltar will be useful in helping the Cylons find and destroy the fleeing human fleet of survivors.

Gaius Baltar, portrayed by James Callis, is a reimagined version of Lord Baltar in the 2003 miniseries and 2004–2009 series.

==== Lieutenant Athena ====
Lieutenant Athena, portrayed by Maren Jensen, is a starfighter pilot and communications specialist who serves in the Core Command bridge crew of the Galactica, and Commander Adama's daughter.

Sharon Agathon (call sign "Athena"), portrayed by Grace Park, is a copy of the Number Eight Cylon model in the 2003 miniseries and 2004–2009 series.

==== Boxey ====
Boxey, portrayed by Noah Hathaway, is Serina's young son. (Note: An adult Boxey appears as Captain Troy in Galactica 1980, portrayed by Kent McCord.) After Boxey's pet daggit, Muffit, is killed in the attack on Caprica, Apollo arranges for a robot daggit, Muffit II, to be given to the boy.

==== Lieutenant Boomer ====
Lieutenant Boomer, portrayed by Herbert Jefferson Jr., is a starfighter pilot.

Sharon Valerii (call sign "Boomer"), is a gender and race swapped version portrayed by Grace Park, is a copy of the Number Eight Cylon model in the 2003 miniseries and 2004–2009 series.

==== Flight Sergeant Jolly ====
Flight Sergeant Jolly, portrayed by Tony Swartz, is a starfighter pilot.

==== Cassiopeia ====
Cassiopeia, portrayed by Laurette Spang, is a Medtech and former “socialator”. She is the love interest of Starbuck. (Note: Cassiopeia is presented as a courtesan in the series pilot.)

==== Colonel Tigh ====
Colonel Tigh, portrayed by Terry Carter, is Commander Adama's second-in-command on the Galactica.

Saul Tigh, portrayed by Michael Hogan, is a reimagined race swapped version of Colonel Tigh in the 2003 miniseries and 2004–2009 series.

==== Lieutenant Sheba ====
Lieutenant Sheba, portrayed by Anne Lockhart, is introduced in "The Living Legend" as a starfighter pilot and the leader of the Silver Spar Viper squadron from the Battlestar Pegasus. She is the daughter of Commander Cain (Lloyd Bridges) of the Pegasus, and is left behind on the Galactica when Cain and the Pegasus go to battle and subsequently disappear. Initially a foil for Apollo, she ultimately professes her love for him in the series finale, "The Hand of God".

=== Recurring ===
==== Serina ====
Serina, portrayed by Jane Seymour, is a reporter-turned-Viper pilot, and Boxey's mother. She marries Apollo, but is subsequently killed by Cylons in "Lost Planet of the Gods".

==== Others ====
- Ed Begley, Jr. as Ensign (later Flight Sergeant) Greenbean
- David Greenan as Flight Officer Omega
- Sarah Rush as Flight Corporal Rigel
- John Dullaghan as Dr. Wilker
- George Murdock as Dr. Salik
- Larry Manetti as Corporal/Lieutenant Giles
- Janet Louise Johnson as Lieutenant Brie
- Jeff MacKay as Corporal Komma
- Jack Stauffer as Bojay

=== Guest ===
- Lew Ayres as President Adar, leader of the Twelve Colonies
- Wilfrid Hyde-White as Sire Anton
- Ray Milland as Sire Uri
- Rick Springfield as Lieutenant Zac, Commander Adama's youngest son
- John Fink as Dr. Paye
- Sheila DeWindt as Lieutenant Deitra
- Janet Lynn Curtis as Sorell
- Roy Thinnes as Croft
- Britt Ekland as Tenna
- James Olson as Thane
- Christine Belford as Leda
- Richard Lynch as Wolfe
- Denny Miller as Ser Five Nine
- Lloyd Bridges as Commander Cain, commander of the Battlestar Pegasus
- Patrick Macnee as Count Iblis
- Kirk Alyn as the Old Man
- Fred Astaire as Chameleon, a con man who may or may not be Starbuck's father
- Anne Jeffreys as Siress Blassie
- Lance LeGault as Maga, the leader of the Borellian Nomen, a warrior tribe of humans with a bony ridge on their foreheads
- Anthony De Longis as Taba, one of the Borellian Nomen
- Robert Feero as Bora, one of the Borellian Nomen
- Frank Ashmore as Flight Sergeant Ortega
- W. K. Stratton as Lieutenant Barton
- Lloyd Bochner as Commandant Leiter
- Randolph Mantooth as Michael
- Kelly Harmon as Sarah
- Ray Bolger as Vector
- Ina Balin as Siress Tinia
- John Hoyt as Domra
- Edward Mulhare as John
- Ken Swofford as General Max-Well
- Melody Anderson as Brenda
- Ana Alicia as Aurora, a past lover of Starbuck's who he thought had been killed in the Cylon attacks
- Paul Fix as Kronus, a retired fleet commander

Macnee also narrated the opening of several episodes, and voiced the Cylons' Imperious Leader. Jonathan Harris voiced Lucifer, an IL-Series Cylon, in nine episodes.

== Galactica 1980 ==
=== Main ===
==== Captain Troy ====
Captain Troy, portrayed by Kent McCord, is an adult Boxey, now a Viper starfighter pilot.

==== Lieutenant Dillon ====
Lieutant Dillon, portrayed by Barry Van Dyke, is a Viper starfighter pilot.

==== Jamie Hamilton ====
Jamie Hamilton, portrayed by Robyn Douglass, is an on-camera reporter for United Broadcasting Company's news program on contemporary Earth.

==== Commander Adama ====
Commander Adama, portrayed by Lorne Greene from the original series, is the commander of the Battlestar Galactica and the human fleet

=== Recurring ===
==== Colonel Boomer ====
Colonel Boomer, portrayed by Herbert Jefferson Jr. from the original series, is a former Viper starfighter pilot who now serves as Adama's second-in-command.

==== Dr. Zee ====
Dr. Zee, portrayed by Robbie Rist in the first three episodes and by James Patrick Stuart thereafter, is a superintelligent child who serves as a scientific advisor to Adama and the Council of Twelve. The episode "The Return of Starbuck" reveals that he had been sent to the Galactica by a stranded Starbuck, at the request of Zee's mysterious mother Angela.

==== Mr. Brooks ====
Mr. Brooks, portrayed by Fred Holliday, is the station manager, and Jamie Hamilton's superior, at United Broadcasting Company's television studios.

=== Guest ===
- Commander Xaviar, portrayed by Richard Lynch in the first three episodes, is a member of the Council of Twelve. With the discovery that Earth is not technologically advanced enough to assist in fighting the pursuing Cylons, Xaviar suggests they use Zee's time warp synthesizer technology to travel back in time to advance Earth's technological development from the past. Adama and Zee object to the idea, but Xaviar ignores them and goes to 1944 Nazi Germany, where he attempts to introduce advanced weapons technology to the Germans via their V-2 rocket program. The plot is foiled by Troy, Dillon and Jamie. The character returns, played by Jeremy Brett, in "Spaceball", impersonating Lieutenant Nash (also played by Brett) in an attempt to hold Galactica's children hostage to secure his freedom.
- Dr. Donald Mortinson, portrayed by Robert Reed, is a renowned nuclear physicist whom Xaviar tries to enlist in his time travel plans.
- Colonel Jack Sydell, portrayed by Allan Miller, is an officer with the United States Air Force charged with tracking down UFO sightings.
- Lieutenant Starbuck, portrayed by Dirk Benedict from the original series, appears in the series' final episode, "The Return of Starbuck". At some point between the events of Battlestar Galactica and Galactica 1980, Starbuck crash lands on a remote planet, and builds a robot companion from Cylon parts, which he names "Cy". As Cy tries to understand human relationships, Starbuck helps a mysterious woman, Angela (Judith Chapman), give birth to a baby boy. Starbuck sends Angela and the baby off toward the Galactica in an escape ship cobbled together with Cy's assistance. A Cylon ship arrives and Cy destroys its occupants to protect his "friend" Starbuck, though Cy is himself irreparably damaged in the encounter. Starbuck remains stranded on the planet, which he has named after himself. The escape pod arrives at the Galactica, containing only the baby, who will grow up to be Dr. Zee.
