= List of The Fall Guy episodes =

The following is a list of the episodes of The Fall Guy TV series that aired on ABC from 1981 through 1986, starring Lee Majors and Heather Thomas.

== Series overview ==
Season	Episodes	Originally released	
Season	Episodes	First released	Last released
1	23	November 4, 1981	May 5, 1982
2	23	October 27, 1982	May 4, 1983
3	23	September 21, 1983	May 2, 1984
4	22	September 19, 1984	April 10, 1985
5	22	September 26, 1985	May 2, 1986

== Episodes ==
=== Season 1 (1981–82) ===
No. overall	No. in season	Title	Directed by	Written by	Original release date	Prod. code
1	1	"Pilot"	Russ Mayberry	Glen A. Larson	November 4, 1981	1E01
2	2	"Pilot"	Russ Mayberry	Glen A. Larson	November 4, 1981	1E01
In the pilot episode, stuntman and part-time bounty hunter Colt Seavers and his cousin and stuntman in training Howie Munson go after an all-powerful Sheriff on his home turf in Arizona in the midst of grappling with a drug-dealing gang that is arm-twisting a singer. Guest Stars: Paul Williams, Eddie Albert, Lou Rawls, Tracy Reed, Cedrick Hardman, Carl Eller, Percy Rodrigues, Terry Kiser, Dave Somerville, Dennis Fimple, Bill McKinney, and Katherine Baumann. Special Cameo appearances by Farrah Fawcett and James Coburn.
3	3	"The Meek Shall Inherit Rhonda"	Sidney Hayers	Glen A. Larson	November 11, 1981	1E03
Colt and Howie head to Mexico in search of a low-spirited swindler and his five-million dollars loot and discover he is being double-crossed by his gorgeous wife and her devious actor boyfriend. Guest Stars: Henry Gibson, Pamela Susan Shoop, Carol Wayne, Pedro Gonzalez-Gonzalez, and Brett Halsey. Special Cameo appearance by Robert Wagner.
4	4	"The Rich Get Richer"	Sidney Hayers	Nick Thiel and David Braff	November 18, 1981	1E07
Samantha ("Big Jack") solicits Colt's help to bring in a rich fraudster who has deceived her after posting bail and Colt has to face off not just a powerful gang that is protecting him but also an insurance investigator Kay Faulkner who is after the same man. Guest Stars: Peter Haskell, Terry Kiser, Michael MacRae, David Moses, Paul Picerni, and Judith Chapman. Special Cameo appearance by Milton Berle.
5	5	"That's Right, We're Bad"	Chris Nyby II	Mark Jones	November 25, 1981	1E05
Samantha arranges for Colt and Howie to pose as prisoners to infiltrate a high-security prison so they can acquaint themselves with a vicious robber nicknamed "The Animal" and track down his accomplice. Guest Stars: Bill Fletcher, Fred Holliday, John Kerry, John Quade, Robert Tessier, Sandy Ward, and Richard Kiel.
6	6	"Colt's Angels"	Frank Beascoechea	Larry Brody	December 2, 1981	1E15
Colt, Howie and Jody dress up and camouflage as bikers to befriend and penetrate an outlawed biker gang that is involved in drug trafficking and bring its leader to justice, by leading the gang to a desolate town rigged with explosives for a movie. Guest Stars: Don Stroud, Lucinda Crosby, Ben Cooper, Sid Haig, and Mary Treen. Special Cameo appearance by Linda Evans.
7	7	"The Human Torch"	Daniel Haller	Nick Thiel	December 9, 1981	1E17
Colt and Howie drive to the small town looking for a wanted arsonist and when everyone including the arsonist's mother claims that he has died due to natural causes, Colt is determined to confirm the veracity of the information even if it involves digging up the arsonist's grave. Guest Stars: Severn Darden, Brianne Leary, Vincent Schiavelli, Bonnie Ebsen, Peter Breck, Gale Sondergaard, and Richard Moll.
8	8	"Japanese Connection"	Jack Arnold	Janis Hendler	December 16, 1981	1E13
Colt is in Hawaii to grab a couple of conmen dealing in drugs, but his task gets tougher when a gangster (Yakuza) working for a Japanese syndicate from whom the conmen have stolen a big stash of marijuana takes Jody hostage and demands Colt hand over the conmen to him. Guest Stars: Dennis Fimple, Bruce M. Fischer, Carol Wayne, and Dana Lee. Special Cameo appearances by Don Ho, Jamie Farr, and Joe Lewis.
9	9	"No Way Out"	Bruce Bilson	David Braff and Ted Lang	January 6, 1982	1E19
A wanted, deep in debt gambler turns himself in, hoping that Colt and Howie will get him out of Las Vegas alive after his botched blackmailing scheme on a mob boss. Guest Stars: Shecky Greene, Michele Carey, Richard Fullerton, Zitto Kazann, Jay Gerber, and Cesare Danova. Special Cameo appearance by Cathy Lee Crosby
10	10	"License to Kill - Part 1"	Russ Mayberry	Glen A. Larson	January 13, 1982	1E09
When a mysterious man named Charles Ryker jumps bail, Colt and Howie follow him to Hawaii where they find themselves mixed up in a tangled plot involving government agencies, deadly assassins and international terrorists. Guest Stars: Monte Markham, William Smith, Ken Swofford, Bennett Ohta, Ken Scott, Tony Young, and Erin Gray. Special Cameo appearance by Lou Ferrigno
11	11	"License to Kill - Part 2"	Russ Mayberry	Glen A. Larson	January 20, 1982	1E11
Colt and Howie learn that Ryker is a lone-wolf CIA operative who is after a terrorist mastermind and when Ryker is killed by a rogue agent, Colt and Howie must foil the assassination attempt on a foreign dignitary and clear their names. Guest Stars: Monte Markham, William Smith, Ken Swofford, Bennett Ohto, Ken Scott, Tony Young, Darby Hinton, and Erin Gray. Special Cameo appearance by Tom Selleck Note: Heather Thomas does not appear in this episode. Note: Jo Ann Pflug does not appear in this episode.
12	12	"Goin' for It!"	Daniel Haller	Robert Janes	January 27, 1982	1E21
When a routine stunt goes wrong and leaves fellow stuntman and Colt's friend Steve Kruger in a coma, Colt seeks to investigate and stumbles upon a gang that is using wrecked cars from the stunts to smuggle out gold from a heist. Guest Stars: Burr DeBenning, Norman Alden, William Bryant, Lynn Borden, Michael G. Kelly, Glenn Corbett, Mayf Nutter, and Judith Chapman.
13	13	"The Adventures of Ozzie and Harold"	Ron Satlof	Nick Thiel	February 3, 1982	1E23
Colt strives to protect his eccentric friend Ozzie (and Ozzie's imaginary friend Harold), who spends time as a scavenger, from a couple of phony cops working for the mob, after Ozzie witnesses the assassination of a judge. Guest Stars: Buddy Hackett, Joyce Jameson, William Bassett, William Bryant, Joe La Due, Fred Lerner, Bob Minor, Beverly Sanders, and Alejandro Rey.
14	14	"Soldiers of Misfortune"	Lawrence Dobkin	David Braff	February 10, 1982	1E25
Colt and Howie are caught in an explosive situation when they join a survival training unit in order to bring an ex-green beret to justice. Guest Stars: J D Cannon, Cynthia Sikes, Steve Sandor, William Bogert, and Robert F. Lyons
15	15	"Ready, Aim... Die!"	Peter Crane	Mark Jones	February 17, 1982	1E27
A distressed damsel pleads with Colt to locate and save her brother from a gambling mafia but after a detective friend whom Colt approaches for assistance is seriously hurt in a hit and run, Colt soon realizes he may have unwittingly walked into a trap. Guest Stars: Mary Crosby, Charlie Callas, Paul Lambert, Michael Delano, Michael Pataki, Hard Boiled Haggerty, and Al Ruscio
16	16	"Ladies on the Ropes"	Daniel Haller	Nick Thiel	February 24, 1982	1E29
Colt tries to help a couple of pro-wrestling girls win a big championship match by disrupting the plans of their scheming manager and an avaricious team owner who wants their contracts, and Colt's plans also involve Howie entering the arena as 'Handsome Howard'. Andre the Giant appears, thus reuniting Six-Million Dollar Man vs Bigfoot. Guest Stars: Val Bisoglio, Tony Burton, Michael Gazzo, Clare Klaren, Melanie Vincz, and Andre the Giant.
17	17	"The Snow Job"	Winrich Kolbe	Glen A. Larson and Robert Janes	March 3, 1982	1E31
Colt is in Aspen, Colorado for a commercial shoot when he runs into an old friend Robin who is being hounded by her Congressman husband and his henchmen after she threatens to expose his illicit affairs and illegal, corrupt deals. Guest Stars: James Carrington, David Hedison, Anne Lockhart, Susanne Reed, Alfie Wise, Morgan Woodward, and James Wainwright.
18	18	"Guess Who's Coming to Town?"	Gil Bettman	Glen A. Larson	March 17, 1982	1E33
With Colt injured in a freak 'accident', Howie and Jody go after a young check-forgery suspect in a small town in Nevada but when they face trouble, a limping Colt with a 'savage' reputation arrives and finds the suspect being held captive by the town's influential men who are hell-bent on protecting a murky secret. Guest Stars: Jason Evers, Joey Forman, Bert Freed, Barbra Horan, John McLiam, Albert Salmi, and Robin Strand.
19	19	"Child's Play"	Paul Stanley	Nick Thiel	March 24, 1982	1E35
Colt, Howie and Jody must protect an irrepressible girl with a photographic memory who holds the key to the case of her father nabbed by the mob while preparing to testify against them. Guest Stars: James Booth, Buck Taylor, and Dana Hill.
20	20	"Charlie"	Daniel Haller	David Braff	April 7, 1982	1E37
While at Reno, Colt meets up with an old acquaintance, a daring stuntwoman named Charlie Hefferton and joins her in her quest to save her brother Mel who is on the run from a mobster and his son from whom he has swindled a fortune and squandered it by gambling. Guest Stars: Asher Brauner, John David Carson, Bruce Gordon, Archie Hahn, Jock Mahoney, and Tricia O'Neil.
21	21	"Three for the Road"	Bruce Bilson	Lou Shaw	April 14, 1982	1E39
Colt reluctantly teams up with Kay Faulkner on a trip to Mexico to recover a stolen cache of jewels. Guest Stars: Joshua Bryant, Judith Chapman, Zitto Kazann, Judy Landers, Scott Marlowe, and Bert Rosario.
22	22	"The Silent Partner"	Tom Connors	Larry Brand and Rebecca Reynolds	April 28, 1982	1E41
A popular singer convinces his driver to take the rap on an assault charge on a man threatening to expose him to save his career, but the man dies and when Colt and Howie try to bring the driver back they learn there's more to the case than meets the eye. Guest Stars: Mitch Carter, Mickey Gilley, Jenny Sherman, and Tracey Walter.
23	23	"Scavenger Hunt"	Cliff Bole	Lou Shaw	May 5, 1982	1E43
Colt and Howie clash with a group of disgruntled, duplicitous naval officers on the trail of the $5 million payroll money stolen five years back by their former colleague who has just walked out of prison. Guest Stars: William Bryant, Terry Carter, Heather Locklear, Gary Lockwood, Doug McClure, Jan Murray as himself, Steve Shortridge, and Christopher Stone. Special Cameo appearance by Herve Villechaize. Note: The final episode in which Jo Ann Pflug appears.

=== Season 2 (1982–83) ===
No. overall	No. in season	Title	Directed by	Written by	Original release date	Prod. code
24	1	"Bail and Bond"	Bruce Bilson	Bill & Jo LaMond	October 27, 1982	7B05
Colt is in Rio de Janeiro shooting a James Bond film when Terri enlists his help to trace an attractive female bail jumper who has flown there and it leaves Colt and Howie caught in a tussle between the Brazilian Police and an elusive, lethal lady ("The Contessa") involved in money-laundering. Guest Stars: Martine Beswicke, John Carter, William Bryant, Sid Haig, Eric Mason, Pamela Susan Shoop, and Keone Young. Note: First appearance of Markie Post, who was in 57 episodes over the next three seasons.
25	2	"The Ives Have It"	Paul Stanley	Glen A. Larson & Lou Shaw	November 3, 1982	7B03
Terri sends Colt and Howie to Aruba to nab a woman who has fled after being charged with burglary in Los Angeles and she turns out to have an identical twin—and also an excellent motive for the theft she had attempted. Guest Stars: Ann Turkel, James O'Sullivan, and Red West.
26	3	"Colt's Outlaws"	Paul Stanley	Larry Brody	November 10, 1982	7B17
Part 1: While shooting a picture down south, Colt's friend and mentor Wild Dan Wilde is arrested and framed for a murder. When Colt learns from Terri that the town's mayor is crooked and building an empire based on fraud, Colt decides to rip the town apart with a bunch of stuntmen disguised as bikers and then makes a getaway with a girl who saw the local Sheriff frame Wild Dan. Guest Stars: Ramon Bieri, Melody Anderson, William Bryant, Robert F. Hoy, L.Q Jones, David Tress, and Jock Mahoney. Special Cameo appearances by Johnny Lee.
27	4	"Colt Breaks Out"	Daniel Haller	Larry Brody	November 10, 1982	7B19
Part 2 to Colt's Outlaws: The mayor learns that someone saw the Sheriff frame Wilde Dan and calls the National Guard and manages to capture the bikers (including Howie and Jody). When Colt learns this and can't let the witness Mary Walker talk to the Attorney-General, he decides to go back to the town to get the others out of jail with Dan and Mary to help, but this time the mayor is ready for him. Guest Stars: Ramon Bieri, Melody Anderson, Kevin Hagen, Robert F. Hoy, L.Q Jones, David Tress, and Jock Mahoney. Special Cameo appearances by Johnny Lee and Charlene Tilton.
28	5	"Mighty Myron"	Cliff Bole	Teleplay by : Mark Jones; Story by : Mark Jones & Les Carter	November 17, 1982	7B07
Colt and Howie try to clear the name of an affable Orangutan named Myron, performing as a carnival exhibit, who has been framed for murdering his trainer and have to do it before he is put to sleep. Guest Stars: Delta Burke, Denny Miller, and Clifton James.
29	6	"Reluctant Traveling Companion"	Michael O'Herlihy	Robert Earll	November 24, 1982	7B09
Colt has to escort an attractive but obstreperous woman, Christina who has been accused of financial fraud, from Philadelphia by train for a court appearance in Los Angeles and also has to protect her from assassins during the journey. Guest Stars: Mary-Margaret Humes, Lonny Chapman, Erik Holland, Lee Patterson, and Michael D. Roberts. Special Guest appearance by Richard Burton.
30	7	"A Piece of Cake"	Bruce Bilson	Burton Armus	December 1, 1982	7B01
Colt visits New York City to nab a small-time gambler but has impeded a larger police investigation on a high-profile criminal named Nick Trainer and finds himself compelled by an uncompromising police Capt. Finley to pursue Trainer. Guest Stars: Dick O'Neill, Terry Kiser, Frank Aletter, Michael Delano, Cork Hubbert, and Bert Rosario.
31	8	"Hell on Wheels"	Vince Edwards	Duane Poole & Tom Swale	December 8, 1982	7B15
Colt and Howie follow a roller derby team to San Diego to grab a female player who faces an assault charge with Jody being part of the team and find that she was just an unwitting accomplice to the manager who is using the team as a mask for his drug operations. Guest Star: Janet Julian, James Wainwright, Tracy Scoggins, William Bryant, and Clu Gulager.
32	9	"How Do I Kill Thee...Let Me Count the Ways"	Daniel Haller	Glen A. Larson	December 22, 1982	7B11
Colt locks horns with a group of ex-CIA operatives who are in charge of security for a major global corporation when they resort to a series of dirty tricks to silence their auditor from exposing missing funds from the company accounts. Guest Stars: David Sheiner, Jack Ging, Paul Williams, Pat McCormick, and Peter Mark Richman. Paul Williams and Pat McCormick's characters (Rooster Steele and Sweets McBride) originate from the Glen A. Larson property Rooster.
33	10	"Win One for the Gipper???"	Bruce Bilson	E. Nick Alexander	January 5, 1983	7B21
When a corrupt army Sergeant kidnaps Colt's pro-football playing cousin Jimmy Joe Seavers and two of his friends and forces them to play and a win football game so he can sell stolen army merchandise on the black market at other army bases, Colt and Howie join the team to thwart his plans. Guests Stars: David Huddleston, Norman Alden, Curtis Credel, Terence Goodman, Tony Longo, Morgan Paull, and Don Stroud. Special Cameo appearances by Dan Fouts, Deacon Jones, Ted Hendricks and Featuring Chick Hearn as the announcer. Vocal Cameo by Howard Cosell.
34	11	"Happy Trails"	Daniel Haller	Teleplay by : Lou Shaw; Story by : Glen A. Larson & Lou Shaw	January 12, 1983	7B23
Episode dedicated to Roy Rogers. While filming stunts in the countryside with Roy, Colt has to deal with a gang of car-thieves operating in the vicinity after they stiff Howie with a stolen car. Guest Stars: John Anderson, William Bryant, Crofton Harderster, Beau Starr, and Marshall R. Teague. Special Cameo appearances by Pat Buttram, James Drury, Jack Kelly, and Doug McClure. Special Guest Stars: Roy Rogers (King of the Cowboys), Trigger (the smartest horse in the movies), and The Sons of the Pioneers. Note: Markie Post does not appear in this episode.
35	12	"Manhunter"	Michael O'Herlihy	Larry Brody	January 19, 1983	7B25
Colt, Howie and Jody fly to Acapulco on the trail of a couple of playboyish crooks and after one of them is found dead, they need to work with another bounty-hunter, the gorgeous Sabrina Caldwell, to track down the other and foil his plan to sell off stolen Mexican treasures. Guest Stars: Priscilla Presley, George Gobel, Burr DeBenning, Gary Hudson, George Loros, Joe Maross, Alejandro Rey, and Stewart Granger. Note: Markie Post does not appear in this episode.
36	13	"The Further Adventures of Ozzie and Harold"	Bruce Bilson	Larry Brody	January 26, 1983	7B29
While protecting his eccentric, vagrant pal Ozzie from hoodlums after he witnesses a homicide, Colt comes across his real identity, that of a rich businessman and a victim of a conspiracy, and hatches a plot to nail the culprit and return Ozzie back home. Guest Stars: Buddy Hackett, Allan Miller, Tracey Bregman, Michael Callan, and Sandy Hackett.
37	14	"Death Boat"	Paul Stanley	Lou Shaw	February 2, 1983	7B13
Colt, Howie and Jody hop aboard a cruise ship with both men posing as millionaires to ensnare an accused jewel thief who has surgically altered her looks but she is also the target of insurance investigator Kay Faulkner and her former accomplice for the stolen jewels. Guest Stars: Alan Feinstein, Elta Blake, William Bryant, Ben Frank, Paul Henry Itkin, Judith Chapman, Rhonda Shear, and Deborah Shelton.
38	15	"Eight Ball"	Michael O'Herlihy	Lou Shaw	February 9, 1983	7B27
Colt lends a helping hand to his old pal and ex-pool game wizard Joe O'Hara to come out of the dumps and compete in a high-profile tournament in Reno and on the way has to tackle goons sent by a gambler who has high stakes in the tournament. Guest Stars: Tony Curtis as Joe O’Hara, “Machine Gun” Lou Butera as Louie Kramer, Victoria Lewis, and Robbi Morgan. Note: Markie Post does not appear in this episode.
39	16	"Spaced Out"	Daniel Haller	Glen A. Larson	February 16, 1983	7B31
Colt and Howie are filming stunts for a war movie in a small, peaceful town when all the tranquility is shattered by "aliens" invading in a saucer-like UFO who rob the town's bank and kidnap Jody. Colt has his work cut out to unravel the mystery after he gets framed for the robbery and is detained by the town's Police. Guest Stars: William Bryant, Pat Corley, Richard Davalos, Robert Donner, Jason Evers, Darby Hinton, Woodrow Parfrey, and Jan Smithers.
40	17	"Strange Bedfellows"	Bruce Kessler	Lou Shaw	February 23, 1983	7B33
A woman who has been arrested for a heist, has Jody kidnapped by her partner to force Terri to bail her out. Colt knows that she will bolt, so he tails her while trying to trace Jody's location and she tries to shake him. Guest Stars: Lewis Van Bergen, William Bryant, Brian Cutler, Charles Dierkop, John Kerry, and Mary Crosby.
41	18	"The Molly Sue"	Michael O'Herlihy	Harry Thomason	March 2, 1983	7B35
On the trail of a grave robber who has fled to Panama in a stolen WW2 B-25, Colt and Howie enlist the help of a feisty veteran pilot and are joined by an attractive but untruthful insurance investigator who is also interested in the plane. Special Appearance by Stuart Margolin Guest Stars: Kristen Meadows, Robert Davi, William Green Bush, Perry Lopez, and Special Guest Star Jeremy Kemp.
42	19	"One Hundred Miles a Gallon"	Bruce Kessler	Teleplay by : Burton Armus; Story by : Robert Earll & Burton Armus	March 9, 1983	7B37
Colt makes a trip to rural South Carolina to help out his former sweetheart Irene after her husband has been murdered and her son made a fugitive by a wealthy and crooked businessman who uses the local moonshining operation as a cover for cocaine smuggling. Guest Stars: Andrew Prine, Eric Stoltz, Michael Bowen, Vince McKewin, Dean Smith, and Michael Constantine as Virgil Sykes. Special Appearance by Trish Van Devere. End credits show: “Co-starring: Trent Dolan, Sunshine Parker, George Caldwell, Paul Tuerpe, and Featuring Gene Rutherford as Clem.”
43	20	"P.S. I Love You"	Don Medford	Larry Brody	March 16, 1983	7B39
Colt, with some help from a stuntwoman who likes to play detective, strives to bring down an illegal gambling den in Palm Springs in order to exonerate an actor friend Tab Hunter (as himself) who has been framed for murder. Special Appearance by Dana Hill Guest Stars: Bruce Bauer, William Bryant, Kirk Scott, Bruce Solomon, and Greg Morris as Gary Jordan. Special Cameo Appearance by Tab Hunter.
44	21	"The Chameleon"	Michael O'Herlihy	Lou Shaw and Aubrey Solomon & Steve Greenberg	April 6, 1983	7B41
Colt tries to get to a bail jumper, a former actor known for his disguising prowess, through his researcher daughter but also has to confront a crooked cop who is after the money previously looted by the actor and his pals. Guest Stars: J.D. Cannon, Dane Clark, Paul Mantee, Frank Marth, and Michelle Phillips.
45	22	"The Chase"	Daniel Haller	Lou Shaw	April 13, 1983	7B43
Colt and a pestering car-thief named Max Downey try to survive a dangerous ride in a motor-home from Texas to Los Angeles, while they are being targeted by an influential militia group that seeks to eliminate Max who is a witness to one of their killings. Guest Stars: Ed Nelson, Michael Pataki, John Quade, Arthur Roberts, and Cleavon Little.
46	23	"Just a Small Circle of Friends"	Michael O'Herlihy	David Chambers	May 4, 1983	7B45
Colt and Howie attempt to penetrate the fortified abode of a cult run by a deceitful couple to rescue a young woman, who has taken refuge there but the stakes are high as she is soon to inherit her rich father's wealth. Guest Stars: Jenny Sullivan, John Vernon, Guy Stockwell, Katherine Brewster, William Bryant, Heather Locklear, and Wings Hauser. Note: Heather Thomas does not appear in this episode.

=== Season 3 (1983–84) ===
No. overall	No. in season	Title	Directed by	Written by	Original release date	Prod. code
47	1	"Devil's Island"	Daniel Haller	Lou Shaw	September 21, 1983	2G01
Colt plots a daring mission with a group of fellow stuntmen to rescue his former high-school sweetheart from a secluded Mexican prison where she is being held as a part of a scheme by her ex-fiancée to preclude her from testifying against him. Guest Stars: Lindsay Wagner, Hector Elias, and Mark Goddard.
48	2	"Trauma"	Ted Lange	Lou Shaw & Michael Halperin	September 28, 1983	2G04
Howie and Jody are injured after a stunt with a studio truck goes wrong, but Colt finds out it was no accident, and that a crook in pursuit of something stashed in Colt's truck is involved. Guest Stars: the crew of Trauma Center, Dick Patterson, Tom Stern, William Bryant, Jeff Cooper, and Clu Gulager. This originally aired as a crossover with Trauma Center. The concluding half ("Notes About Courage") aired the following night, effectively making it a two-part episode of The Fall Guy. For rerun syndication, it is a one-hour episode of The Fall Guy with a different ending not shown during the broadcast run. ("Notes About Courage" is on YouTube.) Note: Last appearance of William Bryant, who had a recurring role in the series.
49	3	"Notes About Courage"	Georg Stanford Brown	Glen A. Larson & Jerry McNeely	September 29, 1983	TC002
Howie continues to recover from his injuries and is visited by his mother while Colt solves the case. Guest stars: Pat Crowley, Lynn Whitfield, Ellen Geer. Note: Lee Majors and Douglas Barr are listed as guest stars on Trauma Center. Note: Heather Thomas does not appear in this episode. Note: Markie Post does not appear in this episode.
50	4	"Pleasure Isle"	Daniel Haller	Deborah Davis	October 5, 1983	2G03
Colt and the gang venture into an island paradise in French Polynesia where a rich businessman is holding his former secretary-cum-mistress hostage after she has blocked his access to his funds. Guest Stars: Richard Lynch, Carol Lynley, and Paul Cavonis.
51	5	"Baker's Dozen"	Russ Mayberry	Howard Berk	October 19, 1983	2G05
Terri sends Colt after a man holed up in a dude ranch in Arizona but after Colt temporarily incapacitates him during a fight and it turns out that he is actually a mole working for the government inside a gang of mercenaries, Colt is obligated to take over his place. Guest Stars: Michael MacRae, Blackie Dammett, Dennis Burkley, Bo Svenson, Burton Gilliam, Karen Kopins, and Michael Horsley.
52	6	"The Last Drive"	Ted Lange	Story by : Walter Dallenbach; Teleplay by : Alan Rachins	October 26, 1983	2G06
After Colt inadvertently impedes a probe, a coercive government crimes investigator bullies Colt into infiltrating a secretive criminal operation as an ace driver and while Colt proves his mettle in a wild car chase on the Los Angeles streets, Howie is not so successful as a French chef. Guest Stars: Ian Wolfe, Tricia O'Neil, Randy Brooks, Joseph Brooks, Marshall Teague, Jourdan Fremin, Marc Alaimo, Clayton Day, Ted Lange, and Dennis Patrick.
53	7	"TKO"	Donald McDougall	David Braff	November 2, 1983	2G02
A promising young boxer in Las Vegas, Leon "Bam Bam" Brannigan and his con-artist manager Lou Carnesco who are being threatened by a local don running a match-fixing racket, get a helping hand from Colt who is in town to grab Lou. Guest Stars: Shecky Greene, Susan Kase, Danny Wells and Dennis Breckner. Special Cameo appearances by Sugar Ray Robinson, Bobby Chacon, and Archie Moore. Special appearance by Larry Holmes as himself.
54	8	"Dirty Laundry"	Russ Mayberry	Lou Shaw	November 9, 1983	2G07
Colt attempts to snatch a woman in Lake Tahoe for skipping bail but realizes she is being blackmailed by a crooked attorney who has abducted her son and is coercing her boyfriend, a popular singer, to launder a huge sum of illegal money. Guest Stars: Terry Kiser, Penny Peyser, Maggie Cooper, Grainger Hines, Jonathan Goldsmith, and Paul Anka.
55	9	"Inside, Outside"	Donald McDougall	Lou Shaw & Michael Halperin	November 16, 1983	2G08
When Terri is kidnapped with Colt being warned not to testify in court against Garrick and after Garrick insists he is being framed by someone in his inside circle, Colt deploys Howie as Garrick's bodyguard with a dubious loyalty to sniff out the conspirator and rescue Terri. Guest Stars: Morgan Brittany, Gary Wood, Anne Lockhart, Dennis Holahan, Christopher Connelly, and Richard Anderson
56	10	"Pirates of Nashville"	Bruce Kessler	Harry Thomason	November 23, 1983	2G09
The son of a man Colt knows, who works at a record in L.A, is arrested and then jumps bail for killing a man he works for. While at Nashville Colt and Howie learn that the boy was framed by a counterfeit operator as the man was on to something. Guest Stars: Ray Stevens, Leigh McCloskey, Red West, and Taylor Laetter. Special Guest appearances by Dottie West and Charlie Daniels as themselves.
57	11	"Hollywood Shorties"	Don Medford	Story by : Daniel Freudenberger; Teleplay by : Michael Halperin & Daniel Freudenberger	November 30, 1983	2G10
When a drug-smuggling gang needs the services of a small-sized stuntman to extricate a package stuck in an airport vent and abducts his wife to force him to do the job, Colt works with a group of other small-sized stuntmen to rescue her. Guest Stars: Robert Fuller, Jennifer Runyon, Marcia DeRousse, Tommy Madden, Michael Dante, Jimmy Briscoe, Martin Cassidy, and Michael Gregory.
58	12	"To the Finish"	Daniel Haller	Story by : James Schmerer; Teleplay by : Deborah Davis & Ron Friedman & Bill Taub	December 7, 1983	2G11
Colt persuades his friend and race-car driver Pat Patterson to compete in a top race to get past haunting memories of a war-time ambush but they both need to deal with a mysterious adversary who is desperate to stop Patterson from making it to the race. Guest Stars: David Carradine, Guy Stockwell, Will Nye, Randolph Mantooth, Stack Pierce, and Meredith MacRae as herself. Note: Markie Post does not appear in this episode.
59	13	"Wheels"	Michael O'Herlihy	Story by : Ron Friedman; Teleplay by : Richard Raskin	December 21, 1983	2G12
While filming in Seattle, Colt confronts an old nemesis Travis Tyler, an impulsive daredevil stuntman who is now paraplegic and accused in a murder conspiracy but reconciles and works to absolve him of the charges and reunite him with his fiancée. Guest Stars: Jim Knaub, Jennifer Darling, Robert O'Reilly, Steve Sandor, Robin Riker, and David Doyle.
60	14	"Cool Hand Colt"	Donald McDougall	Lou Shaw & Michael Halperin	January 4, 1984	2G14
Colt is in Louisiana to take in a young, hot-headed environmental activist but allies with him to derail the plans of the all-powerful and unscrupulous Sheriff of the local parish who is scheming to usurp the local natural habitat for commercial purposes. Guest Stars: Tim Dunigan, Doug McClure, Linda Thompson, and Robert Gooden.
61	15	"The Huntress"	Daniel Haller	Ron Friedman & Deborah Davis	January 11, 1984	2G13
Colt is tasked with chasing down "Ms. Turner", a cross-dressing hit-"man" who has an obessive passion for Rodin sculptures. In this case (and much to his displeasure), Colt is joined by his acquaintance Diana, the widow of an old friend and an amateur bounty hunter who covets the $ 50,000 reward for a charity cause. Guest Stars: Cyd Charisse, David Sheiner, and Harvey Jason.
62	16	"Bite of the Wasp"	Don Medford	Lou Shaw	January 18, 1984	2G15
A loose pastiche of The Sting broken into three acts. Colt, Howie and Jody are working on a low-budget film when the producer finds themselves extorted for money. The extortionist is a crooked councilor who has recklessly run up some considerable gambling debts with the 'syndicate'. Colt decides to mount a 'sting' operation by pretending to be a contract killer called 'The Wasp' and getting Jody to finagle her way into the councilor's affections. Guest Stars: Tab Hunter, Raymond St. Jacques, Roger Perry, Arnie Moore, and Mary-Margaret Humes.
63	17	"Rabbit's Feet"	Daniel Haller	Edward J. Lakso	January 25, 1984	2G16
Terri convinces a reluctant Colt to travel to the hinterland of Argentina and rescue a crafty conman who is in trouble with the local law and ranchers for attempting to steal and smuggle horse embryos out of the country. Guest Stars: Robert Morse, Julie Carmen, Victor Mohica, Carlos Romero, and Henry Darrow.
64	18	"Olympic Quest"	Georg Stanford Brown	Ron Friedman	February 1, 1984	2G17
Colt heads to Sarajevo, Yugoslavia to watch his sister Tracy try and win the Gold medal for skiing at the 1984 Olympics, but when Colt gets there, he learns that someone is trying to kill her for accidentally, filming a kidnapping while filming her boyfriend George playing hockey. Guest Stars: Jennifer Holmes, Philip Brown, Luke Askew, George Innes, Savely Kramarov, Walter Gotell, and Steven Keats. Note: Markie Post does not appear in this episode.
65	19	"Always Say Always"	Donald McDougall	Story by : Lou Shaw & Chris Lucky; Teleplay by : Lou Shaw & Michael Halperin	February 22, 1984	2G18
While performing stunts in Hong Kong for a new Bond movie, Colt tangles with a local cartel backed by a corrupt top cop who are after an American art historian over a set of valuable smuggled Chinese artefacts. Guest Stars: Jonathan Frakes, Soon-Teck Oh, Barrie Ingham, and James Hong. Special Guest appearances by Britt Ekland, Joanna Pettet, and Lana Wood as themselves.
66	20	"King of the Cowboys"	Daniel Haller	Lou Shaw & Bill Taub	February 29, 1984	2G19
The second episode dedicated to Roy Rogers. Colt is back shooting for Roy's TV special and is perplexed as to why some men are desperate to rustle the horses rented for the show and finds it is no coincidence that some sparklers that look like diamonds keep showing up in the dirt. Guest Stars: Gary Lockwood, Roy "Dusty" Rogers Jr, Michael Pataki, Robert Tessier, Lewis Van Bergen, and Roy Rogers. Special Cameo appearances by Peter Breck, Jock Mahoney, and John Russell.
67	21	"Boom"	Don Medford	Ron Friedman	March 7, 1984	2G20
Colt tries to rescue Jody and a couple of other hostages from a multi-story hospital where they are being held by a drug-dealing gang that seeks to get back at Colt for foiling their major operation and also demands a hefty ransom for Jody's release. Guest Stars: John Vernon, Frank Campanella, Robert Walker, Robert Donner, Mallie Jackson, Robert DoQui, and Grainger Hines
68	22	"Undersea Odyssey"	Michael O'Herlihy	Barry & Stuart Jacobs	March 21, 1984	2G21
Terri tricks the gang into going to Bermuda, to help a friend of hers whose boyfriend has jumped bail after being charged with the murder of the captain of a boat, but Colt soon finds that there is more at stake including a pile of stolen gold that was being carried by the boat and is now lodged at the bottom of the ocean. Guest Stars: David Hedison, Irena Ferris, Sid Haig, Robert Miranda, and Mary Crosby as insurance investigator Kim Donnelly. Special Cameo appearance by Keith Barish.
69	23	"Old Heroes Never Die"	Daniel Haller	Michael Halperin	May 2, 1984	2G22
Colt comes to the aid of an ex-baseball legend with whom he has a childhood connection, when he has fallen on tough times and is also being targeted by a gang that runs a fraudulent gambling racket. Guest Stars: Paul Winfield, Mills Watson, Bill McKinney, Dick Bakalyan, and Ross Porter

=== Season 4 (1984–85) ===
No. overall	No. in season	Title	Directed by	Written by	Original release date	Prod. code
70	1	"Losers Weepers"	Hollingsworth Morse	Lou Shaw	September 19, 1984	2Z02
The episode features popular comedians playing many of the roles. The gang are in Arizona and go after a woman whose two-timing boyfriend operated a three-million dollar heist but she is also being followed by a couple of hoodlums and an insurance investigator on the trail of the missing money. Guest Stars: Don Adams, Frank Gorshin, Karen Salkin, Avery Schreiber, Dick Shawn, Larry Storch, Jimmie Walker, Sammy Jackson, Kay Lenz, and Kristen Meadows
71	2	"Stranger Than Fiction"	Bruce Bilson	Deborah Davis	September 26, 1984	2Z03
Chased by hitmen, Colt has to dangerously wade through the everglades of Florida escorting a female writer after she adamantly refuses to part with a tape containing incriminating info about a mob boss, which she plans to use for her latest book. Guest Stars: Susan Lucci, Jayson Kane, Curtis Taylor, and Richard Lynch.
72	3	"Prisoner"	Michael O'Herlihy	Sam Egan	October 10, 1984	2Z05
After Jody makes an impetuous move of going solo after a female skip and they both get locked up in a seedy women's facility in Arizona where inmates are being sexually exploited and trafficked for money by the officials in charge, Colt and Howie attempt to break in and rescue Jody and the other women. Guest Stars: Jim McMullan, Patrice Chanel, Rex Holman, Alice Tompkins, Sybil Danning, Annette McCarthy, and Joan Shawlee.
73	4	"Terror U."	Alan Crosland Jr.	David Garber & Bruce Kalish	October 17, 1984	2Z04
Colt hides in a frat house from hit men, after he picks up his latest bounty, who was turning state's evidence in a money laundering case. Guest Stars: Ken Stovitz, Michael Callan, Joshua Cadman, Brian Mann, Ross Hagen, Robert Dryer, Ted Gehring, Dana Elcar, Henry Gibson, Leaf Phoenix, and David Millbern
74	5	"Private Eyes"	Hollingsworth Morse	Story by : Doug Heyes Jr. Teleplay by : Doug Heyes Jr. & Bruce Kalish & David Garber	October 24, 1984	2Z06
Working on a TV detectives' special show, Colt helps Howie come to terms with his impractical father while skirmishing with a gang that is after the cars procured for the stunts to retrieve some contraband items hidden within. Guest Stars: Cameron Mitchell, Paul Lambert, Marshall Teague, Derek Barton. Special Guest appearances by William Conrad, Barry Newman, and Mike Connors. Note: Markie Post does not appear in this episode.
75	6	"October the 31st"	Alan Crosland Jr.	Story by : Lou Shaw & Sam Egan & Thomas G. Edwards; Teleplay by : Lou Shaw & Sam Egan	October 31, 1984	2Z07
A Halloween-themed episode in which Colt and the gang are filming in an eerie mansion and encounter strange happenings that include Jody being stalked by the 'ghost' of the mansion's deceased owner. Guest Stars: Orson Bean, Doug McClure, Signe Hasso, Cassandra Peterson, and John Carradine. Special Cameo appearances by David Carradine, Keith Carradine, and Robert Carradine. Note: Markie Post does not appear in this episode.
76	7	"Sandcastles"	Daniel Haller	Andrew Schneider	November 7, 1984	2Z01
Terri sends Jody to locate a buy she bailed out in Hawaii. When she finds him, she falls for him. Colt later arrives and wants to take him back but he claims he was framed and he knows how to get the ones who framed him. It seems like he has something they want, counterfeiting plates. Guest Stars: Tim Dunigan, Robert O'Reilly, Phillip Richard Allen, and Al Leong.
77	8	"Dead Bounty"	Hollingsworth Morse	William Read Woodfield and Keith A. Walker	November 14, 1984	2Z08
Colt's prisoner ends up in a coma after being left in police custody in a small town and Colt needs to find the other prisoner at the station, whom the corrupt cops are trying to shake down for his hidden loot, to bring out the truth. Guest Stars: Michael J. Pollard, Brooke Bundy, Dennis Fimple, Denny Miller, Eb Lottimer, Steve Bassett, and Robert Davi.
78	9	"The San Francisco Caper"	Daniel Haller	Story by : Michael Halperin; Teleplay by : David Garber & Bruce Kalish	November 21, 1984	2Z09
Colt visits San Francisco to capture a man charged with stealing a precious diamond but runs into some clues that suggest the "theft" of the diamond might have been staged by its owner. Guest Stars: Peter Brown, Christopher Connelly, Beau Starr, Christopher Thomas, and LaGena Lookabill.
79	10	"Baja 1000"	Daniel Haller	Story by : Stuart & Barry Jacobs; Teleplay by : Andrew Schneider & Sam Egan	November 28, 1984	2Z11
The director who gave Colt his first job and who has been using it for years to get Colt to work on his low-rate movies. Now he wants Colt to take part in a desert race supposedly to get more footage. But what he didn't tell Colt is that he made a bet with someone in Vegas who upon learning how much he stands to lose sends a man whom Colt sent to prison to keep him from winning. Guest Stars: Bert Kramer, Clayton Day, Jack Kruschen, Michael Dante, Alex Colon, Kristoffer Tabori, Peter Mark Richman, and Meredith MacRae as herself. Note: Markie Post does not appear in this episode.
80	11	"The Winner"	Ray Austin	Lou Shaw & Sam Egan	December 19, 1984	2Z12
Jason, a boy with Down Syndrome on his way to the Special Olympics, witnesses a murder at a bus station. After he hides in the backs of Colt's truck and his group's bus leaves without him, Colt helps him evade the killers and take part in the event. Unusually, Howie's knowledge about Down Syndrome is quite correct and even somewhat useful. Guest Stars: Dennis Cole, Evan Richards, Randolph Mantooth, Robert DoQui, Kathrine Baumann, Terrence McNally, Jason Kingsley, and Larry Holmes. Special Cameo appearances by Lou Ferrigno and Bruce Jenner. Note: Markie Post does not appear in this episode.
81	12	"Semi-Catastrophe"	Ray Austin	Aubrey Solomon & Steve Greenberg	January 2, 1985	2Z10
Colt joins forces with an independent female trucker against a highway gang that is fleecing truckers in the garb of protection money, but has to deal with one more adversary - her extremely possessive, mulish boyfriend. Guest Stars: Cristina Raines, John Matuszak, Lonny Chapman, Gary Lee Davis, Stack Pierce, and Robert F. Hoy,
82	13	"Her Bodyguard"	Don McDougall	Story by : Sam Egan; Teleplay by : Andrew Schneider & Sam Egan	January 9, 1985	2Z14
Colt manoeuvers himself to be the personal bodyguard of a rich and obstinate woman Jessica Beaumont in order to trap her best friend's brother who is targeting Jessica after he blames her for his sister's injury in a mysterious fire accident. Guest Stars: Sonja Smits, Christopher Templeton, Daniel McDonald, and David Hedison
83	14	"I Love Paris"	Daniel Haller	Story by : Ron Friedman & Bruce Kalish & David Garber; Teleplay by : Bruce Kalish & David Garber	January 16, 1985	2Z13
The gang is invited to Paris on false pretenses by the assistant of a pacifist Nobel laureate whose life may be in danger from an assassin whom only Colt can recognize. While there Colt is framed for shooting a police officer and has to break out of jail to stop the assassin. Guest Stars: Alana Stewart, David Sheiner, Luca Bercovici, Warwick Sims, Aharon Ipale, and Michele Shaw Special Cameo appearances by J.P. Romano and Peter MacLean.
84	15	"Sheriff Seavers"	Hollingsworth Morse	Bruce Kalish & Andrew Schneider & David Garber	January 23, 1985	2Z17
Colt and Howie venture into a small town to seize a bail jumper who is the son of a wicked local honcho, with the aid of the local Sheriff but when the Sheriff is gunned down, they temporarily don the roles of the Sheriff and his deputy and eventually save the town from a calamity. Guest Stars: Michael Young, Zetta Whitlow, Robert Tessier, Stewart Moss, John Dennis Johnston, Alan Jordan, Gregory Walcott, James R. Mitchum, and Morgan Woodward.
85	16	"Tailspin"	Lindsley Parsons III	Aubrey Solomon & Steve Greenberg	January 30, 1985	2Z15
Colt is on the trail of a bank robber and based on the only clue, starts performing flying stunts at an air show run by an old-timer helped by his doting daughter, and soon discovers why the robber evinces interest in the show. Guest Stars: Red West, Jeff Cooper, Leslie Wing, Bill McKinney, and Charles Dierkop
86	17	"High Orbit"	Daniel Haller	Stuart & Barry Jacobs	February 6, 1985	2Z16
Colt is the stuntman for a movie being shot at NASA's control center and after a couple of close shaves that reek of sabotage, Colt uncovers a sinister plot under the guise of the movie to steal a valuable microchip from a space shuttle. Guest Stars: John Vernon, Richard Pierson, Allan Rich, and Don Galloway. Special Guest appearances by Buzz Aldrin, Scott Carpenter, and Michael Collins.
87	18	"Rockabye Baby"	Hollingsworth Morse	Lou Shaw & Sam Egan	February 13, 1985	2Z18
An aspiring singer flees from bail after being charged with the murder of a music producer and 'demolition man' Colt teams up with her father to find her while the real killer, an extortionist who was trying to fleece money from the producer, also targets her for the audio tape in her possession which has a recording of the crime incident. Guest Stars: Kutee, Hari Rhodes, Terry Carter, Steve Sandor, and Don Blakely. Special Cameo appearances by La Toya Jackson, The Temptations, and The Four Tops
88	19	"Spring Break"	Ted Lange	Aubrey Solomon & Steve Greenberg	February 20, 1985	2Z19
Colt and the gang head to Palm Springs after a university's bursar accused of embezzling funds and have to tangle with the real crooks behind the fraud and also deal with a bunch of students who have decamped with a disk that contains incriminating data about the embezzlement. Guest Stars: Ken Olandt, Raymond St. Jacques, Eric Scott, Christopher Michael Moore, Forest Whitaker, Lee Paul, Erik Stern, Mills Watson, and Frank Aletter.
89	20	"Split Image"	Daniel Haller	Andrew Schneider	February 27, 1985	2Z20
Colt and Howie nab a 'cocaine dealer' in San Diego but soon realize he is not the one they are after but an exact look-alike, an innocent shoe-salesman who is being set up by the cocaine dealer to be the target of a rival mob whom he has swindled. Guest Stars: Terry Kiser, Ron Perlman, Robert Costanzo, Carlos Fernandez, Joe Campanella, and Mary-Margaret Humes. Special Cameo appearances by Gary Owens and Stephanie Edwards
90	21	"Skip Family Robinson"	Tom Connors	David Garber & Bruce Kalish	March 13, 1985	2Z21
Colt is at a health resort to nab a habitual conman but ends up working with him and his daughters to trap the resort owner's mob brother who is illegally in the country incognito and wants the conman dead to protect his cover. Guest Stars: Tom Atkins, Jourdan Fremin, Robert Hogan, Jennifer Holmes, Tim Rossovich, John Ireland, and Cal Worthington. Note: This is the last episode in which Markie Post appears.
91	22	"Reel Trouble"	Daniel Haller	Andrew Schneider & Sam Egan	April 10, 1985	2Z22
While filming stunts in Turkey, Colt tries to deal with a young, overenthusiastic stuntwoman who is making the stunts a bit unsafe and then strategizes to recover the film's negatives that are stolen for ransom by a local hashish-dealing gang. Guest Stars: Daphne Ashbrook, Herbert Edelman, David Hess, Sid Haig, Michael Zand, Clive Revill and Theodore Bikel. Note: As indicated above, Markie Post does not appear in this episode.

=== Season 5 (1985–86) ===
No. overall	No. in season	Title	Directed by	Written by	Original release date	Prod. code
92	1	"Dead Ringer"	Don Medford	Sam Egan & Andrew Schneider	September 26, 1985	001
In his first assignment for bail bondswoman Pearl Sperling, Colt travels to Vegas where his quarry, an expert forger named Claude Purcell, is enrolled in an Elvis impersonation contest and takes on a gang that is forcing Purcell to forge a wealthy man's will. Guest Stars: Steven Keats, Kirk Wall, Nedra Volz, Alex Kubik, and Greg Mullavey. Special Guest appearance by Mickey Gilley. Special Cameo appearance by David Carradine. Note: First appearance of Nedra Volz.
93	2	"The King of the Stuntmen"	Bernard McEveety	David Garber & Bruce E. Kalish	October 3, 1985	002
While competing in a contest for stuntmen, Colt foils a plot to rob the hotel's safe and also gets a chance to clear things up with a fellow competitor and old friend who had been blaming Colt for losing his girlfriend. Guest Stars: Geoffrey Lewis, Teri Austin, Michael MacRae, Rion Hunter, Sam Ingraffia, John Dennis Johnston, Peter Breck, and Ted Dawson.
94	3	"Femme Fatale"	Alan Crosland Jr.	Sam Egan	October 10, 1985	003
A reluctant Howie has to pose as a female impersonator to infiltrate a Bakersfield club where the sole witness to a crime is hiding in disguise to protect himself, and while Colt and a bullying FBI agent strive to trap the killer who is aiming to silence the witness, Howie has to stave off an unwanted admirer. Guest Stars: Scott Baio, Alan Fudge, Stacey Nelkin, Harvey Jason, Nedra Volz, Judd Omen, James "Gypsy" Haake, Wolf Muser, and Stephen Elliott.
95	4	"A Fistful of Lire"	Hollingsworth Morse	Andrew Schneider	October 17, 1985	004
While working in Italy, Howie falls for a local girl working in the movie set and her brother invites Colt to their village. But when they get there, they soon learn that the brother wants to pit them against a powerful local gangster in the pursuit of a treasure of wartime loot hidden in the nearby mountains. Guest Stars: Robert Desiderio, Eddie Zammit, James Luisi, and Clare Kirkconnell.
96	5	"The Life of Riley"	Larry Elikann	David Garber & Bruce Kalish	November 30, 1985	006
Colt drives to a Sacramento motel to nab a young man charged with vandalism who implores Colt to help him trace his kidnapped daughter using the only clue he has and when Colt obliges, they soon stumble onto an adoption ring that may be involved. Guest Stars: Peter Barton, Stanley Kamel, Charles Boswell, Frank Hamilton, and Nedra Volz.
97	6	"October the 32nd"	Georg Fenady	Sam Egan	December 7, 1985	005
Elvira and company are filming a horror movie in an old haunted mansion during a storm and have to deal with an escaped mental patient. Guest Stars: Cassandra Peterson, Chris Humphreys, Tony Steedman, Vernon Wells, Doug McClure, Ian Wolfe, and Vincent Schiavelli.
98	7	"Seavers: Dead or Alive"	Bruce Kessler	Story by : Michael Poryes & Frederick Rappaport; Teleplay by : Frederick Rappaport	December 14, 1985	007
As he is about to testify against a powerful member of a syndicate, Colt gets framed on a drugs charge and needs to vindicate himself by finding the woman who tricked him and also stave off an old enemy, a disgraced bounty hunter who is thirsting to settle scores with Colt. Guest Stars: Bo Svenson, William Prince, Suzanne Barnes, Daphne Maxwell Reid, Nedra Volz, and Frank Koppala.
99	8	"Escape Claus"	Bruce Bilson	Story by : Philip John Taylor; Teleplay by : Philip John Taylor & Douglas Heyes Jr.	December 21, 1985	0012
Colt and the gang turn good Samaritans around Christmas eve as they help a part-time Santa Claus evade a bunch of gangsters who are after the stolen government bonds in his possession, and use the reward money from the bonds to help an orphanage from being shut down. Guest Stars: Bernard Fox, Lynn Whitfield, Tom Hallick, Judith Barsi, and Robert Donner.
100	9	"No Rms., Ocean Vu."	Hollingsworth Morse	Story by : Carol Saraceno; Teleplay by : Carol Saraceno & Andrew Schneider & Douglas Heyes Jr.	January 4, 1986	0013
While shooting some commercials in the Caribbean, a reluctant Colt has to escort a rich, haughty woman to a publicity event and a botched attempt to rob her jewels leaves her and Colt stranded on a desolate island. Guest Stars: Cindy Morgan, Christopher Neame, Danny Wells, and M. C. Gainey.
101	10	"Miami's Nice"	Hollingsworth Morse	David Garber & Bruce Kalish	January 10, 1986	0014
Colt's vacation in Miami goes awry when he is enticed by an attractive woman to go on a bounty hunt and finds himself caught between a relentless federal drugs enforcement agent and a ruthless mob family that he is seeking to bust. Guest Stars: Terry Kiser, Frank Annese, Michael Ansara, Robert Gray, Abraham Alvarez, and Katherine Kelly Lang. Special Cameo appearance by Jack Carter.
102	11	"Reunion"	Bruce Kessler	Sam Egan & Tom Benko	January 17, 1986	0015
Colt reconnects with his old flame Laura at his high-school reunion and when Laura's brother gets robbed of a heap of jewels and then Laura gets abducted, Colt suspects a link between the two incidents. Guest Stars: Sherry Rooney, Mills Watson, Kenneth Gray, Dana Gladstone, James Sloyan, and Bo Hopkins.
103	12	"Trial by Fire"	Daniel Haller	Douglas Heyes Jr.	January 24, 1986	0011
While in Bangkok for some routine stunt work, Colt is revisited by his war-time past as he embarks on a daredevil mission along with a former soldier to rescue their ex-comrade who was presumed dead but is being held in a prison camp in Cambodia. Guest Stars: Dennis Haysbert, Michael Greene, Clyde Kusatsu, and Al Leong
104	13	"In His Shadow"	Lindsley Parsons III	David Garber & Bruce Kalish	January 31, 1986	0019
Colt has a surprise visit from an unloving son borne with a former girlfriend and tries hard to reconcile with him and also has to rescue him from the bad company of a car-stealing ring. Guest Stars: Lee Majors II, Ben Marley, Kene Holliday, Castulo Guerra, Jeffrey Josephson, and Ji-Tu Cumbaka.
105	14	"Lucky Stiff"	Georg Fenady	Story by : Thomas G. Edwards; Teleplay by : David Garber & Bruce Kalish & Thomas G. Edwards	February 7, 1986	0017
A depressed loser takes out a contract for his own murder so his wife will get his life insurance money but then wins a big lottery and Colt tries to save him from the hitmen he hired who now want to fleece him out of his winnings. Guest Stars: Randolph Mantooth, Rebecca Balding, Robert Fuller, and Arthur Burghardt.
106	15	"Beach Blanket Bounty"	Daniel Haller	Andrew Schneider	February 21, 1986	008
While in Miami for some stunt work by the beach, Colt takes up an assignment to grab a bail jumper who has been charged with industrial espionage and is in the vicinity, but needs some help from a struggling music band to nail the culprit while he tries to sell off stolen design plans of an aviation engine to a fence. Guest Stars: Members of Sha Na Na, Grant Aleksander, Paul Mantee, Oliver Clark, and Nedra Volz (voice only). Special Guest appearance by Pat Boone.
107	16	"The Last Chance Platoon"	Hollingsworth Morse	Sam Egan & Andrew Schneider	February 28, 1986	009
Colt gets drafted into the army by an old friend to work undercover as the leader of a platoon of misfits and find those responsible for stealing army supplies from the base. Guest Stars: Jeff Pomerantz, Steve Jamieson, Clu Gulager, Jim Greenleaf, Dennis Ott, Anthony James, Leslie Jordan, Beau Billingslea, Curtis Taylor, and Dennis Patrick.
108	17	"I Now Pronounce You ... Dead"	Daniel Haller	John Alan Schwartz & E. Paul Edwards	March 7, 1986	0018
Pearl presses Colt to grab a conman at his wedding in San Diego and when he slips away under chaos, Colt is led to a trail of several women who have been tricked by the conman into marrying him and also has to get the better of the conman's other foes. Guest Stars: George Wyner, Suzanna Marshall, John Aprea, D. D. Howard, Nedra Volz, and Ava Lazar
109	18	"Two on a Skip"	Tom Connors	Story by : David Garber & Bruce Kalish; Teleplay by : Douglas Heyes Jr.	March 21, 1986	0022
After the first bounty hunter who was sent to nab a suspect seems to procrastinate, Trench sends Colt to San Francisco to track them both down and Colt gets drawn into a crooked deal involving a stash of stolen armor and mob money that the first bounty-hunter covets. Guest Stars: Larry Riley, Willard Pugh, Robert Miranda, Beau Starr, Marilyn McCoo, and Robert Donner. Note: Heather Thomas does not appear in this episode.
110	19	"The Lady in Green"	Bruce Bilson	Bill Kraft	March 28, 1986	0016
With Colt in hospital for a knee surgery, Howie and Jody reluctantly team up with an ex-actor and his pal, who used to play a crime-fighting duo in the movies, to probe a murder the actor witnessed at a museum, and a recuperating Colt soon joins in. Guest Stars: Hurd Hatfield, Eddie Deezen, Sid Melton, Maurice Marsac, Beverly Archer, and Lloyd Bochner.
111	20	"Tag Team"	Daniel Haller	Story by : David Garber & Bruce Kalish; Teleplay by : Andrew Schneider & Douglas Heyes Jr.	April 4, 1986	0020
Colt is uneasy after becoming the owner of two brawny, unkempt wrestlers through a poker game but after some professional training by Howie, they come in handy for snagging a counterfeiter who is being shielded by a couple of mobsters. Guest Stars: Dana Hill, Elisha Cook Jr, Red West, Jay S. York, Jerry Potter, Tim Rossovich, Robert Tessier, Dionne Warwick, Peter Iacangelo, Richard Lynch, and Robert Donner.
112	21	"War on Wheels"	Don Medford	Story by : Chuck Tately & Kevin White; Teleplay by : Douglas Heyes Jr.	April 11, 1986	0021
Colt is in the Kentucky countryside for a movie when Pearl persuades him to go after a biker gang leader and it leads to Colt and the gang being holed up in a desolate, soon-to-be-demolished town whose sole inhabitants are a woman and her grandfather, surrounded by dangerous bikers. Guest Stars: Keenan Wynn, Sonny Landham, Jeannetta Arnette, Jim Staskel, Paul Drake, and Nedra Volz. Note: Last appearance of Nedra Volz.
113	22	"The Bigger They Are"	Hollingsworth Morse	Stephen Glantz	May 2, 1986	0010
A cop wants evidence against a club owner who sells PCP to kids, and Colt and the team help him put the dealers away. Also Colt and the cop help a teenage boy learn to fight after he tells Colt he's being bullied by a local gang. Guest Stars: Tony Burton, Marc Alaimo, Jon Matthews, Billy Drago, Leigh Christian, Mickey Morton, and Marvin Kaplan.
