= SS Catalina =

Passenger ship

- Catalina about 1960–64

History
- Name: Catalina (1924–42); FS 99 (1942–46); Catalina (1946–2009)
- Owner: Wilmington Transportation Company (1924–60); M.G.R.S. (1960–75) (M-Vern Maynard, G-June Gates, R-Fred Rosenberg, S-Charlie Stillwell); Hymie & Ruth Singer (1977–96)
- Operator: Catalina Island Steamship Line (1924–42); US Army (1942–46); Catalina Island Steamship Line (1946–75)
- Builder: Los Angeles Shipbuilding and Drydock Company
- Laid down: December 26, 1923
- Launched: May 3, 1924
- Christened: May 3, 1924
- Completed: 1924
- In service: 1924–1975
- Out of service: September 14, 1975
- Fate: Partially sank in Ensenada harbor in 1997, scrapped 2009–2010

General characteristics
- Tonnage: 1,766 GRT
- Displacement: 2,390 tons at design mean draft
- Length: 301 ft 7.5 in (91.9 m) LOA; 285 ft (86.9 m) LBP
- Beam: 52 ft (15.8 m) moulded, main deck; 44 ft (13.4 m) waterline
- Draft: 13 ft 5 in (4.1 m) at 2,390 tons
- Decks: 5, 3 for passenger use
- Installed power: 2 Hooven-Owens-Rentschler Co. triple expansion engines
- Speed: 15.5 kts
- S.S. Catalina
- U.S. National Register of Historic Places
- California Historical Landmark
- Los Angeles Historic-Cultural Monument
- Location: Destroyed
- Built: 1924
- Architect: Babcock & Wilcox
- NRHP reference No.: 76000495
- CHISL No.: 894
- LAHCM No.: 213

Significant dates
- Added to NRHP: 1976-09-01
- Designated LAHCM: 1979-05-16

SS Catalina, also known as The Great White Steamer, was a 301-foot steamship built in 1924 that provided passenger service on the 26-mile passage between Los Angeles and Santa Catalina Island from 1924 to 1975. According to the Steamship Historical Society of America, Catalina carried more passengers than any other vessel anywhere. From August 25, 1942, until April 22, 1946, the ship served as the Army troop ferry U.S. Army FS-99 at the San Francisco Port of Embarkation transporting more than 800,000 troops and other military personnel between embarkation camps and the departure piers.

After a period of service as a floating discothèque, the ship ran aground on a sandbar in Ensenada Harbor, Mexico, in 1997 and partially sank on the spot. After a rescue effort seeking to return her to her original condition failed, she was scrapped in 2009.

== Design and construction ==
Catalina was constructed at a reported cost of $1 million by the Los Angeles Shipbuilding and Drydock Company for the Wilmington Transportation Company, which had long served Catalina Island and was purchased with the island by chewing gum and confectionery magnate William Wrigley Jr.. The ship was to join the steamers Avalon, Cabrillo and Hermosa already serving the island and designed to make the trip from Los Angeles Harbor to Avalon of 25.5 nautical miles (29.3 mi; 47.2 km) in one and a half hours.

Catalina was a twin-screw steel passenger steamer. She was 301 feet 7.5 inches (91.9 m) in length overall, 285 feet (86.9 m) length between perpendiculars, 52 feet (15.8 m) beam moulded at the main deck, 44 feet (13.4 m) beam at the waterline, with a mean draft of 13 feet 5 inches (4.1 m) at load displacement of 2,390 tons. The hull was double bottomed with tanks for fuel and water ballast with six transverse watertight bulkheads extending to the main deck. Propulsion was by two triple expansion steam engines with cylinders of 20.5 inches (0.52 m), 35 inches (0.89 m) and 60 inches (1.52 m) and stroke of 36 inches (0.91 m), fed by four forced draft boilers and designed for 3,600 i.h.p. at 100 revolutions. Two 40 kilowatt generators provided electrical power.

Designed for daylight operation, she had a mainly glass-enclosed saloon deck and ballroom with a promenade deck. There were ten staterooms on the main deck and four staterooms plus an owners suite on the promenade deck. A unique feature of the ship was the arrangement of the lifeboats, which were stowed in recesses in the hull just above the waterline to clean passenger decks and quick and efficient launching.

Keel laying for Catalina was on December 26, 1923. Company and Los Angeles city officials were present at her launching on May 3, 1924; delivery was on July 1, 1924.

== Passenger service to Santa Catalina Island ==
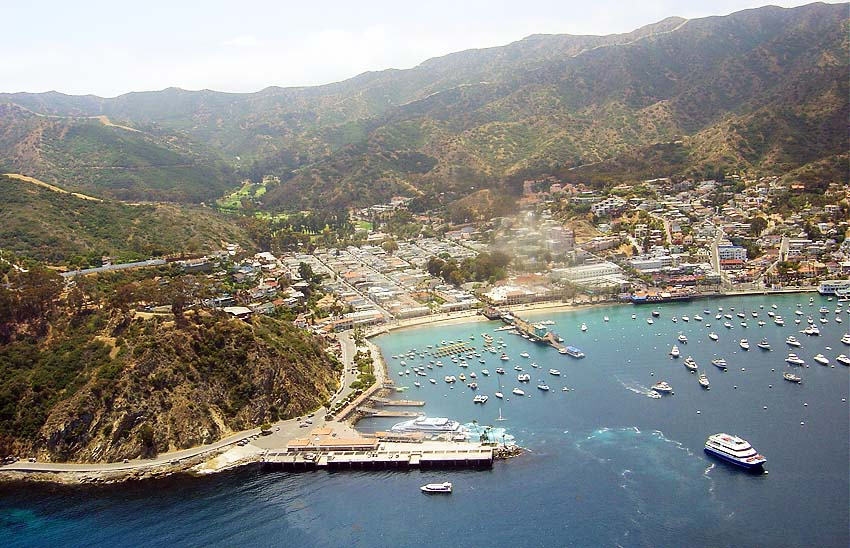
Avalon harbor on Catalina Island

Between 1924 and 1975, Catalina carried about 25 million passengers between Los Angeles and Avalon Harbor. According to the Steamship Historical Society of America, she carried more passengers than any other vessel anywhere.

In its heyday, the ship was known as the "Great White Steamer", and carried 2,000 passengers at a time on the two-and-a-half hour trip to Catalina. Among its famous passengers were Presidents Calvin Coolidge and Herbert Hoover, actor Robert Mitchum and many of the great musicians of the Big Band era. The Los Angeles Times recalled the passage to Avalon:

"To board the Catalina during its heyday was to enter a world of luxurious leather settees and gleaming teak. On the upper deck people danced to swinging big bands. Magicians and clowns entertained passengers. On the lower deck youngsters played hide and seek among the lifeboats, and couples found hidden spots where they could be alone. ... Residents fondly remember the rituals with which the ship was greeted as it approached the island: Speedboats would circle the ship, water skiers slicing through its giant wake. Closer to shore, children swam out to dive for coins passengers tossed into the bay. People in Avalon gathered to sing as passengers stepped off the ship that docked near the center of town."

The United Press reported on 24 December 1951 that Catalina had returned to service at Los Angeles Harbor after a two-month overhaul and annual inspection.

In 1958, the 26-mile trip to Catalina Island was made famous by Four Preps' hit song "26 Miles (Santa Catalina)". The song reached the #2 position on the U.S. popular music charts. The metric distance of "40 kil-o-meters" also is sung.

In 1960, fed up with all of the excessive taxation and union pressure, Phillip K. Wrigley sold the ship to a group of investors, known as M.G.R.S. President, Charlie Stillwell, and Vice President, Vern Maynard who was also President of Channel Concessions, ran the ship, as well as managed the Casino Ballroom during the early to mid-1960s.

The ship is featured in the 1967 film "Catalina Caper".

== World War II troop ferry ==
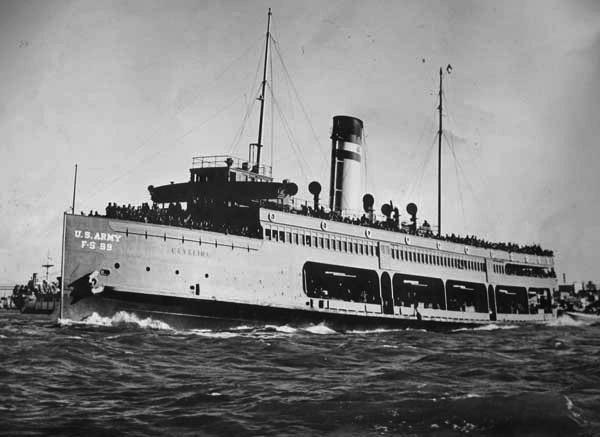
Catalina as US Army ship FS-99 in 1943

On August 25, 1942 Catalina was delivered to the War Shipping Administration (WSA). Ownership remained with Wrigley's Wilmington Transportation Company, and the vessel was placed under bareboat charter to the War Department on the same date. The ferry was designated a Coastal Freighter and Passenger Vessel (FS) and assigned the Army number FS-99. US Army FS-99 was used to transport troops from embarkation camps to the ocean transports throughout the San Francisco Port of Embarkation. The ship's troop capacity was 2,500 with a civilian crew of 39 officers and men.

As the Army began equipping its large ocean transports with new radar in 1946 an obsolete set was installed aboard FS-99 and adjusted to detect nearby objects for tests in use under harbor conditions. Tests were successful with the ship's master, Howard J. King, stating he "wouldn't be without it." A newer Raytheon model S0-8 radar set was installed, making the ship the first Army harbor vessel so equipped, and on its first use in a regular trip bringing returning troops to Camp Stoneman located the Army ferry Hayward grounded in a fog.

The ship's last week, before being declared surplus to the port and Army's needs, was her busiest with 12,764 Army personnel transported. The ship had been the last contact troops had with continental transportation before boarding ocean transports and shipping overseas and was now the first for those returning from the Pacific. On her last run she was turned over to WSA by her Army service master, former Sacramento river pilot Captain Howard J. and placed under command of her peacetime master, Captain E. L. Mussetter. The ship was returned to civilian service on April 22, 1946.

FS-99 transported more military personnel than any other military transport, with a total of about 820,000 troops being carried within the San Francisco Bay area.

== Retirement, abandonment, and fate ==
By the early 1970s, smaller, faster vessels made it difficult for Catalina to compete for passenger traffic, and she was retired from service in 1975.

In 1977 Catalina was bought at auction for $70,000 by real estate developer Hymie Singer as a Valentine's Day gift for his wife. The ship was moved for several years between Newport Beach, San Diego, Santa Monica Bay, and Long Beach. At one point, there was a proposal for her to ferry tourists up the Nile River, but her 21 feet of draft was too deep for the river. As the ship bounced from one port to another, one writer noted: "Twice she broke free of her moorings in Long Beach and once nearly hit a tanker; it was as if the ship was rebelling against her fate, having gone from being a source of pride to an embarrassment to a naval hazard."

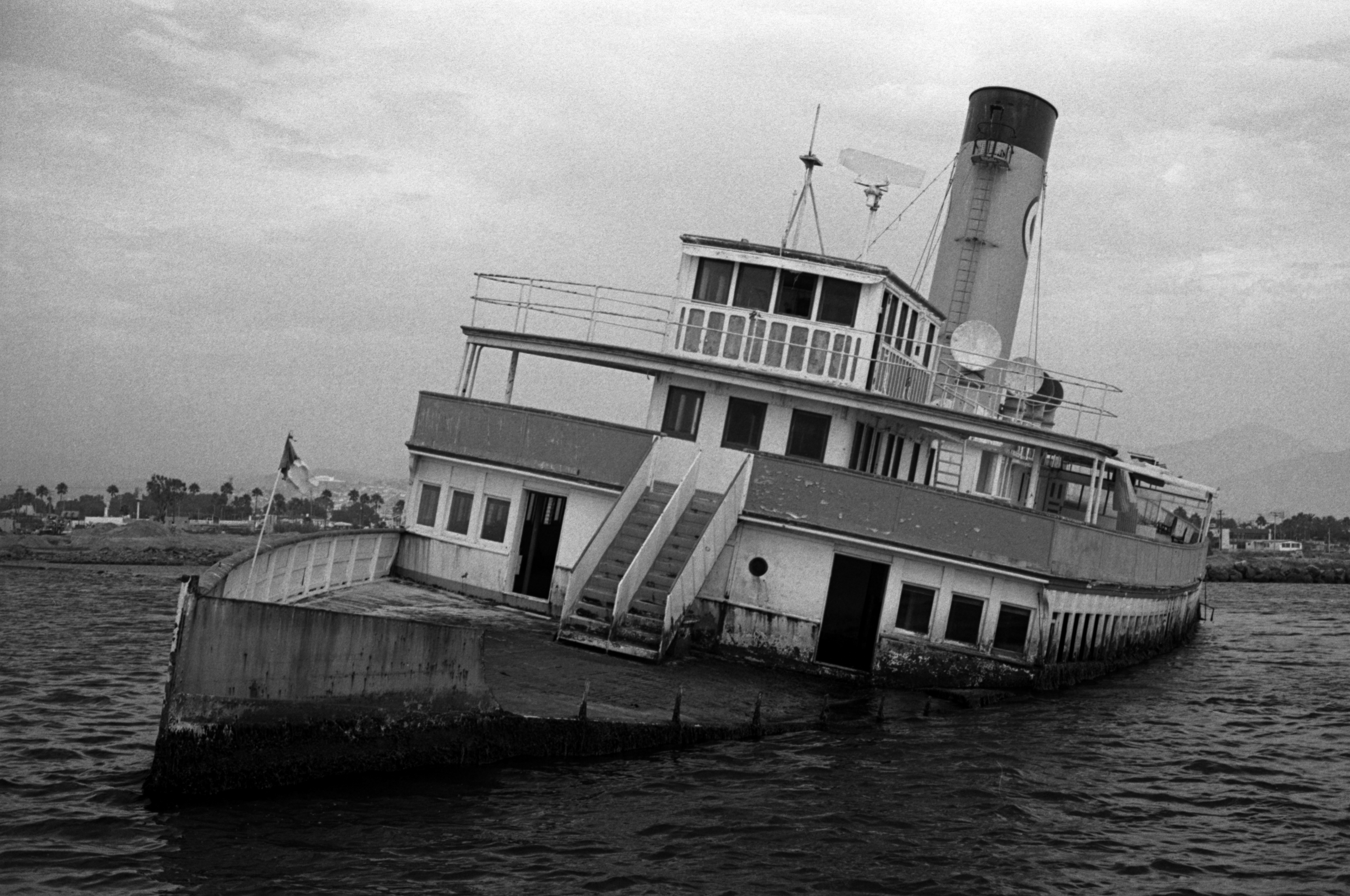
Catalina aground and partly sunk in Ensenada Harbor

In 1985 Singer moved Catalina to Ensenada, Baja California, where she became the focus of a series of unsuccessful business ventures, including a floating discothèque and the Catalina Bar and Grill. In late 1997 the ship escaped her moorings and grounded on a sandbar in Ensenada Harbor. She remained half-submerged and stuck. After years of neglect, she was badly decayed and rusted and had been stripped by looters and vandals. Preservationists had sought since the late 1990s to raise funds to return Catalina to Los Angeles for restoration, but she was finally broken up starting in January 2009 and completed by late 2009 or early 2010.

== Historic recognition ==
Catalina was recognized as a Los Angeles Historic-Cultural Monument (LAHCM #213) by the city's Cultural Heritage Commission, and was a California Historical Landmark. She was listed on the National Register of Historic Places in 1976.

The ship was featured in Visiting... with Huell Howser Episode 736.

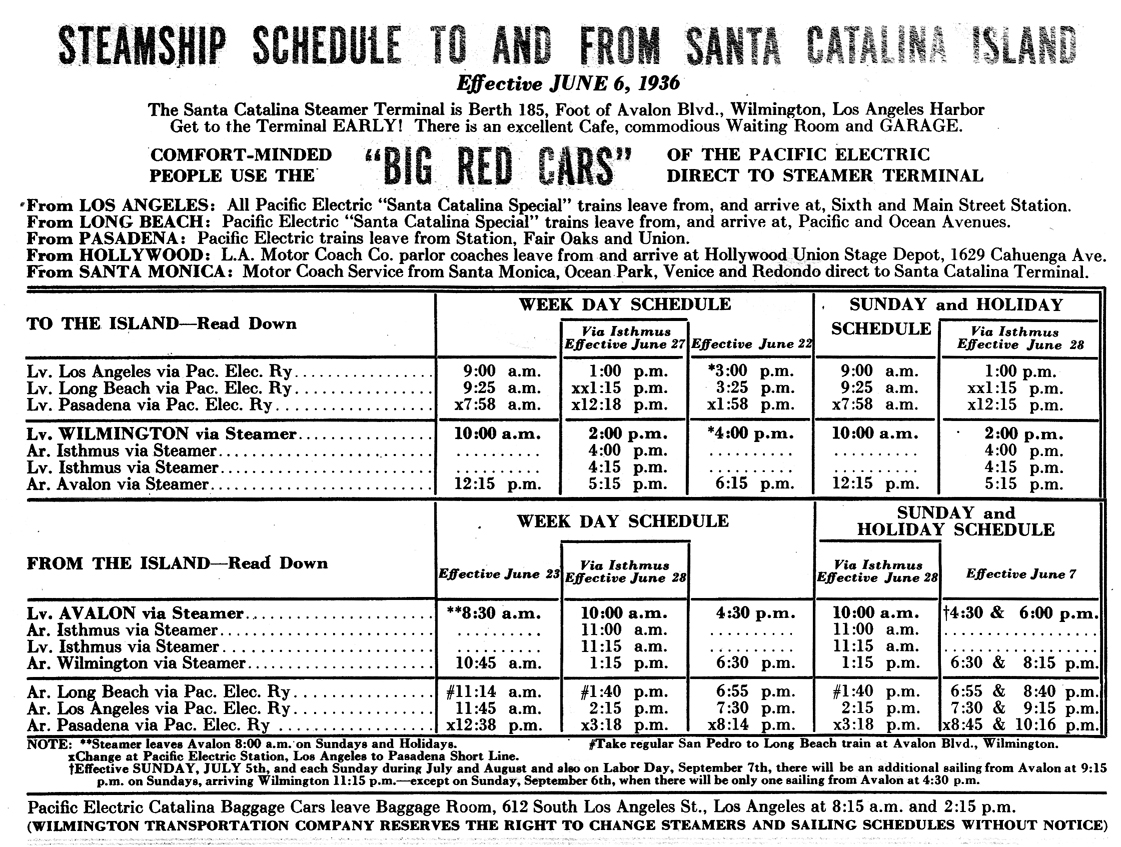
1936 schedule for daily steamer service to Santa Catalina Island via Catalina, Avalon, and Cabrillo

The California Historical Landmark marker at Port of Los Angeles, Berth 96 reads:

- NO. 894 S.S. CATALINA – Commonly referred to as the Great White Steamer, the ship was specially built by William Wrigley to serve his Catalina Island as a passenger ferry. She was christened on May 23, 1924. During World War II, she was requisitioned for use as a troop carrier, but in 1946 she resumed her voyages to Avalon.

== See also ==
- List of Registered Historic Places in Los Angeles

== Videos ==
- Video of the Catalina decaying in Ensenada Harbor
- Video: "The Big White Steamers to Catalina"
- Video: "The Great White Steamship"
