= Lou Shaw =

American producer and screenwriter

- Born: 1925 or 1926
- Died: February 11, 2015 (aged 89)
- Occupations: Producer, screenwriter
- Years active: 1958–1986
- Known for: Co-creator of Quincy, M.E.
- Spouse: Peggy O'Shea
- Awards: Edgar Award (1978, Best Episode in a TV Series)

Lou Shaw (c. 1925 – February 11, 2015) was an American producer and screenwriter. He was known for co-creating the medical drama Quincy, M.E. with Glen A. Larson.

== Biography ==
Shaw worked as a writer and producer on multiple television programs from the late 1950s into the mid-1980s. He won an Edgar Award, shared with Tony Lawrence, for the Quincy, M.E. episode "The Thighbone Is Connected To The Knee Bone". Shaw wrote the play Worse Than Murder about the trial of Julius and Ethel Rosenberg. He had a daughter affected with Down syndrome, wrote a novel featuring a man with Down syndrome titled Honor Thy Son in 1994, and often included people with disabilities in storylines and casting. Shaw was married to Peggy O'Shea, a screenwriter for soap operas, with whom he had a son, Chris, born circa 1953.

== Television credits ==
- 12 O'Clock High
- Barnaby Jones
- Beyond Westworld
- Columbo
- The Donna Reed Show
- The Fall Guy
- Half Nelson
- Love, American Style
- Maude
- McCloud
- The Misadventures of Sheriff Lobo
- Mission: Impossible
- Naked City
- Quincy, M.E.
- The Virginian
