= A Letter to the Beatles =

Single by The Four Preps
- B-side: "College Cannonball"
- Released: March 9, 1964
- Recorded: February 10, 1964
- Genre: Pop rock
- Length: 2:55
- Label: Capitol
- Songwriters: Ivan Ulz, Glen A. Larson, Bruce Belland, Lennon–McCartney
- Producer: Stu Phillips

"A Letter to the Beatles" is a novelty song by the Four Preps. It was released as a single on March 9, 1964, by Capitol Records who had both the Beatles and the Four Preps signed to their roster.

"A Letter to the Beatles" rose to number 85 on the Billboard Hot 100; however, the single was soon withdrawn by Capitol after Duchess Music, the publisher of "I Want to Hold Your Hand", refused to give permission for a parody version. The recording was later included on a compilation CD by the Four Preps.

== Background ==
The song parodies the Beatlemania of the era, telling the story of a woman who expresses her undying love for the Beatles in a series of letters, to which the Beatles respond by insisting she send "25 cents for an autographed picture" and "one dollar bill for a fan club card". In the end, the woman sends in the money. The track was co-written by two of the Four Preps, Glen Larson and Bruce Belland and includes parts of the Beatles' song "I Want to Hold Your Hand".

The song is an updated version of a largely identical in lyric and melody 1962 record by Billy Kidd entitled "A Letter to Hayley." In this song the singer writes letters of admiration to actress Hayley Mills, only to receive responses that, just as in "A Letter to the Beatles," urge him to send 25 cents for an autograph picture, and one dollar for a fan club card. Whereas the fan in "A Letter To the Beatles" is promised that if she sends in right away she will receive a lock of hair from their Saint Bernard, Billy is instead told he'll receive a picture of Hayley with her Saint Bernard. Just as "A Letter To The Beatles" included references to "I Want to Hold Your Hand," Billy Kidd's song includes references to Hayley's hit "Let's Get Together."

== Chart performance ==
Chart (1964)	Peak position
US Billboard Hot 100	85
