= Half Nelson (TV series) =

American detective comedy-drama TV series

- Created by: Glen A. Larson; Lou Shaw
- Starring: Joe Pesci; Victoria Jackson; Fred Williamson
- Opening theme: "L.A. You Belong to Me" performed by Robert Jason
- Composers: Stu Phillips; Robert Jason
- Country of origin: United States
- Original language: English
- No. of seasons: 1
- No. of episodes: 9

Production
- Running time: 60 minutes
- Production companies: Glen A. Larson Productions; 20th Century Fox Television

Original release
- Network: NBC
- Release: March 24 – May 10, 1985

Half Nelson is an American detective comedy-drama series starring Joe Pesci that aired on NBC from March 24 until May 10, 1985. Created by Glen A. Larson and Lou Shaw, the series premiered with a two-hour pilot movie before moving to Friday nights from 8 to 9 p.m. Pesci starred as Rocky Nelson, a former NYPD officer who moves to Hollywood to pursue an acting career but instead takes a job at a private security firm called Beverly Hills Patrol. Dean Martin appeared in a recurring role as a fictionalized version of himself, in what became his final acting role before his death in 1995, while Rod Taylor co-starred in the pilot as a deputy NATO commander.

== Premise ==
Rocky Nelson is a former New York City cop who moved to Beverly Hills, where he got a job at a private security service for the rich and famous, while attempting to make it as an actor. In addition to guarding celebrities, he also helps solve crimes.

== Cast ==
- Joe Pesci as Rocky Nelson
- Fred Williamson as Chester Long
- Victoria Jackson as Annie O'Hara
- Bubba Smith as Kurt
- Dick Butkus as Beau
- Gary Grubbs as Det. Hamill
- Dean Martin as Himself

== Episodes ==
No.	Title	Directed by	Written by	Original release date	Prod. code
1	"Pilot"	Bruce Bilson	Glen A. Larson & Lou Shaw	March 24, 1985	3U01
2	"Pilot"	Bruce Bilson	Glen A. Larson & Lou Shaw	March 24, 1985	3U01
3	"The Deadly Vase"	Alan Cooke	Story by : Aubrey Solomon & Steve Greenberg; Teleplay by : Lou Shaw	March 29, 1985	3U02
4	"Uppers and Downers"	James Sheldon	Donald Ross	April 5, 1985	3U03
5	"Diplomatic Immunity"	Alan Cooke	Story by : Janis Hendler; Teleplay by : Simon Muntner	April 12, 1985	3U04
6	"Nose Job"	Arthur Allan Seidelman	Lou Shaw & Simon Muntner	April 19, 1985	3U05
7	"Chariots for Hire"	N/A	Mark McClafferty	Unaired	3U06
8	"Malibu Colony"	James Sheldon	Story by : Aubrey Solomon & Steve Greenberg; Teleplay by : Simon Muntner & Richard Freiman	May 3, 1985	3U07
9	"The Beverly Hills Princess"	Bernard McEveety	Story by : Lou Shaw; Teleplay by : Simon Muntner & Richard Freiman	May 10, 1985	3U08
