= Big Man (The Four Preps song) =

Single by The Four Preps
- B-side: "Stop, Baby"
- Released: 1958
- Genre: Pop
- Length: 2:26
- Label: Capitol
- Songwriters: Bruce Belland & Glen A. Larson

The Four Preps singles chronology
"26 Miles (Santa Catalina)" (1957)	"Big Man" (1958)	"Summertime Lies" (1958)

"Big Man" is a song written by Bruce Belland and Glen A. Larson, and released by The Four Preps in 1958.

== Chart performance ==
The song reached No. 5 on Billboard's Top 100 Sides chart, while reaching No. 3 on Billboard's chart of sides "Most Played by Jockeys", and No. 6 on Billboard's chart of "Best Selling Pop Singles in Stores". The song also reached No. 2 on the United Kingdom's New Musical Express chart, and 3 weeks at No. 4 on Canada's CHUM Hit Parade.

Chart (1958)	Peak position
UK - New Musical Express	2
US Billboard - Top 100 Sides	5
US Billboard - Most Played By Jockeys	3
US Billboard - Best Selling Pop Singles in Stores	6
Canada - CHUM Hit Parade	4
US Billboard - R&B Best Sellers in Stores	10
US Billboard - Most Played R&B By Jockeys	9

== Covers by other artists ==
- Herman's Hermits
