= Down by the Station =

Song
- Written: 1948
- Songwriters: Paul Mills, Slim Gaillard

"Down by the Station", also known as "Down at the Station", is a popular song written by Paul Mills and Slim Gaillard and first recorded by The Slim Gaillard Trio in 1947. The song was most famously recorded by Tommy Dorsey in 1948.

== Background ==
The song remains popular today as a children's music standard, a simple song about a railroad station master seeing the steam locomotives off to work. The lyrics are:

Down by the station early in the morning,
See the little pufferbellies all in a row.
See the engine driver pull the little handle,
Puff, puff, Toot! Toot! Off we go.

The song itself predates 1948; it was reportedly seen in a 1931 issue of Recreation.

== Similarities to other tunes ==
Whether deliberately copied or not, the melody of "Down by the Station" is closely related to the chorus of the French-Canadian folk song "Alouette". Some have pointed out that though the first line is similar to "Alouette", it is closer to the tune of "The Itsy-Bitsy Spider," with the first two lines being similar. The third line of "Down By the Station" is higher in pitch than the second, and the fourth line returns to the pitch of the first line (except for a higher pitched or onomatopoetic "Toot! Toot!").

== Other versions ==
- The Four Preps recorded a version of "Down By the Station" in 1959, featuring an entirely different set of lyrics by group members Bruce Belland and Glen Larson. It peaked at #13 on the Billboard Hot 100 and #10 in Canada.

== Popular culture ==
- The lyrics may have inspired Reverend Wilbert Awdry to write his first Railway Series story, Edward's Day Out.
- Herman Munster sings along with Russian spies in Season 2, Episode 2 of The Munsters (Herman, the Master Spy) 1965

== See also ==
- List of train songs
