= The Four Preps =

American folk quartet

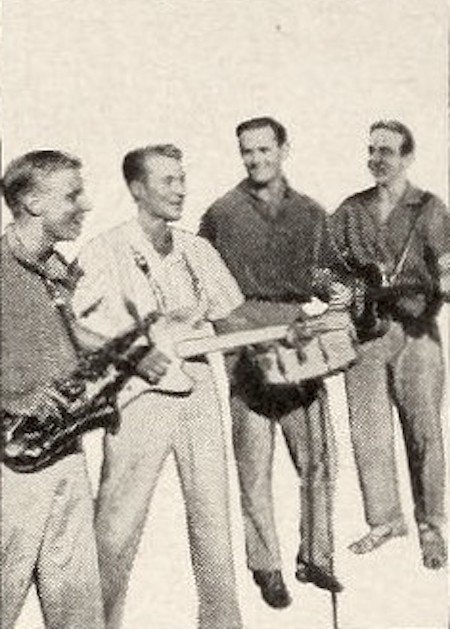
- The Four Preps in 1959

Background information
- Origin: Los Angeles, California, United States
- Genres: Folk, pop
- Years active: 1956–present
- Label: Capitol
- Members: Bruce Belland; Bob Duncan; Michael Redman; Jim Armstrong
- Past members: Ed Cobb; Marv Ingram; Glen Larson; Don Clarke; David Somerville; Jim Pike; Jim Yester; Joe Dickey; Skip Taylor

The Four Preps are an American popular music male quartet. In the 1950s and 1960s, the group amassed eight gold singles and three gold albums. Their million-selling signature tunes included "26 Miles (Santa Catalina)", "Big Man", "Lazy Summer Night", and "Down by the Station".

The Four Preps' numerous television and motion picture appearances included four years backing teen heartthrob Ricky Nelson on The Adventures of Ozzie and Harriet and appearing with Sandra Dee in the film Gidget. The group's most recent television appearance was with the award-winning 2004 PBS special, Magic Moments: The Best of 50s Pop.

The current incarnation of the Four Preps features co-founder and original lead singer Bruce Belland, Bob Duncan (formerly with the Diamonds and the Crew Cuts), Michael Redman (of the Crew Cuts), and Jim Armstrong. Their shows are currently an amalgamation of singing everything from doo-wop to Tin Pan Alley standards and comedy.

== Original line-up ==
- Bruce Belland, lead vocals (born October 22, 1936, Chicago, Illinois)
- Ed Cobb, bass (born February 28, 1938; died September 19, 1999)
- Marv Ingram, high tenor (born Marvin Inabnett July 29, 1938; died March 7, 1999)
- Glen A. Larson, baritone (born January 3, 1937 Los Angeles, California; died November 14, 2014)

== History ==
The four original members were students at Hollywood High School and were signed to a recording contract by Capitol Records, after one of Capitol's executives saw them at a talent show at that school in 1956. They had a minor chart hit that year with "Dreamy Eyes". Between 1956 and 1964, the Preps reached the Billboard pop charts with 13 different songs. In 1957 they appeared with Lindsay Crosby, Bing Crosby's son, in the television special The Edsel Show.

Their biggest hit was "26 Miles (Santa Catalina)," which was written by Belland and Larson in 1957 and reached number two early the following year. The record sold over one million copies, earning a gold disc. Around this time, Ricky Nelson appeared with them at a Hamilton High School lunch hour assembly singing "Blue Moon of Kentucky".

Belland and Larson also wrote "Big Man", which reached number three in 1958. In the United Kingdom, it peaked at number two on the UK Singles Chart, thus becoming the group's biggest hit there. The pair also composed new lyrics for the older tune "Down by the Station", which peaked at number 13 in 1960. Cobb wrote a handful of songs for the group, though not any of their chart hits; Cobb later became a noted writer and/or producer of hit material for other artists, especially The Standells' "Dirty Water", Brenda Holloway's "Every Little Bit Hurts" and Gloria Jones' "Tainted Love," later recorded by Soft Cell. Many Four Preps records were arranged by their high school friend and collaborative pianist Lincoln Mayorga.

Don Clarke replaced Ingram in 1958 with the Album “The Things we did last summer,” and continued with them for over a year. In 1959, the group appeared as themselves in the film Gidget. Don was in a car accident on July 22, 1959 and was not able to continue with the Four Preps. Ingram finished college at UCLA, and rejoined the group in 1960.

The group was known for its family-friendly comedic humor in live performances. In 1960, they recorded a parody single, "More Money for You and Me," which included single parody verses of several popular songs by The Fleetwoods, The Hollywood Argyles, The Platters, The Four Freshmen, The Kingston Trio and Dion and the Belmonts. The title parody, sung to the tune of "Tom Dooley," went like this:

Hang down the Kingston Trio,
Hang 'em from a tall oak tree;
Eliminate the Kingston Trio;
More money for you and me.

In 1962, they released "The Big Draft", another novelty record in which they mockingly suggested that several American music groups be drafted into the military, parodying their songs to make the point. The record once again included single-verse parodies of popular hits of the day, this time from The Platters, The Four Aces, The Marcels, The Highwaymen (the folk band), and Dion (who had split from the Belmonts in 1960). A similar idea was later used by The Barron Knights in their record Call Up the Groups.

Both "More Money for You and Me" and "The Big Draft" were recorded live at North Hollywood High School.

The group last appeared on the Billboard Hot 100 singles chart in 1964, when "A Letter to The Beatles" charted for a total of three weeks beginning March 21, peaking at number 85 before being pulled from sale. The arrival of The Beatles, along with the rest of the British Invasion, coincided with the decline of popularity of the Four Preps and most other folk revival groups. In 1966, David Somerville, formerly of The Diamonds, joined the group, replacing Cobb. In 1969, the group disbanded, as their type of music had become less popular. Belland and Somerville occasionally performed as a duo after the breakup.

== Later careers ==
Belland continued writing songs for other singers, as well as writing television show scripts, eventually becoming a network executive. Belland was a producer on several game shows in the 1970s for Ralph Edwards Productions. Cobb became a record producer and sound engineer; he composed and produced the top-twenty hit, "Dirty Water" for The Standells in 1966; "Every Little Bit Hurts" for Brenda Holloway in 1964; and "Tainted Love" for Gloria Jones also in 1964, which became a worldwide hit for Soft Cell in 1982. Somerville went into television acting and providing voice-overs. Larson became a television producer/writer/director, creating Battlestar Galactica, Knight Rider and variety television series; he and Somerville would reunite to collaborate on the song "Unknown Stuntman," the theme song to another one of Larson's TV series, The Fall Guy. Ingram became a commodities broker. Clarke became a music teacher at Glendora High School. Don Clarke was a music director at Mark Keppel High School in Alhambra, California from 1965 to 1967.

In the 1980s, Belland, Cobb, Somerville, and Jim Pike (formerly of the Lettermen) eventually formed a new "Four Preps" group and went on to perform. Jim Yester, formerly of The Association, replaced Pike in 1993, and the group became the "New Four Preps".

In March 1999, Ingram died of a heart attack; Cobb died of leukemia in Honolulu, Hawaii later the same year.

Yester, Belland and Somerville then recorded and toured for a short time as “Triple Gold – The Three Tenors of Pop” and then moved on to pursue individual opportunities. In 2004 PBS asked Bruce to put together a one shot version of the Four Preps for “Magic Moments”, a PBS Special saluting the hit makers of the 1950s. Bruce, Glen Larson, Jim Yester and David Somerville performed on that show as The Four Preps and the program has become one of public television's biggest fund raisers. Somerville died on July 14, 2015.

Belland's daughters, Tracey Bryn Belland and Melissa Brooke Belland, followed in their father's footsteps as singers, forming a group named Voice of the Beehive.

== Discography ==
=== Studio albums ===
Year	Title	Peak chart positions	
Year	Title	US 200	US CB
1958	The Four Preps	—	—
1958	The Things We Did Last Summer	—	—
1959	Dancing and Dreaming	—	—
1960	Down by the Station	—	49
1961	The Four Preps on Campus	8	7
1962	Campus Encore	40	45

=== Singles ===
Year	Titles (A-side, B-side) Both sides from same album except where indicated	Chart positions					Album
Year	Titles (A-side, B-side) Both sides from same album except where indicated	US	US AC	US R&B	AUS	UK	Album
1956	"Dreamy Eyes" b/w "Fools Will Be Fools"	75					The Four Preps
1957	"Moonstruck in Madrid" b/w "I Cried a Million Tears"						The Four Preps
1957	"Falling Star" b/w "Where Wuz You" (Non-album track)						The Four Preps
1957	"Promise Me Baby" b/w "Again 'n' Again 'n' Again"						The Four Preps
1957	"Band of Angels" b/w "How About That" (from The Four Preps)						Non-album track
1958	"26 Miles (Santa Catalina)" b/w "It's You"	2		6	9		The Four Preps
1958	"Big Man" b/w "Stop Baby" (Non-album track)	3		9	4	2	Down by the Station (Later retitled Early in the Morning)
1958	"Lazy Summer Night" b/w "Summertime Lies"	21			54		Down by the Station (Later retitled Early in the Morning)
1958	"Cinderella" b/w "Gidget" (Non-album track)	69			— 41		Down by the Station (Later retitled Early in the Morning)
1959	"She Was Five and He Was Ten" b/w "The Riddle of Love" (Non-album track)						Down by the Station (Later retitled Early in the Morning)
1959	"Big Surprise" b/w "Try My Arms" (Non-album track)	111					Down by the Station (Later retitled Early in the Morning)
1959	"I Ain't Never" b/w "Memories, Memories"	79					Down by the Station (Later retitled Early in the Morning)
1959	"Down by the Station" b/w "Listen Honey (I'll Be Home)"	13			30		Down by the Station (Later retitled Early in the Morning)
1960	"Got a Girl" b/w "(Wait Till You) Hear It from Me" (Non-album track)	24			74	28	The Four Preps on Campus
1960	"Sentimental Kid" b/w "Madelina"						Non-album tracks
1960	"Kaw-Liga" b/w "The Sand and the Sea" (from Dancing and Dreaming)						Non-album tracks
1960	"I've A'ready Started In" b/w "Balboa"						Non-album tracks
1961	"Calcutta" b/w "Gone Are the Days"	96			71		Non-album tracks
1961	"Dream Boy, Dream" b/w "Grounded"						Non-album tracks
1961	"More Money for You and Me" (medley) b/w "Swing Down Chariot"	17	4		5	39	The Four Preps on Campus
1961	"Once Around the Block" b/w "The Seine"						Non-album tracks
1962	"The Big Draft" (medley) b/w "Suzy Cockroach"	61	15		35		Campus Encore
1962	"Good Night Sweetheart" b/w "Alice"						Non-album tracks
1963	"Charmaine" b/w "Hi Ho Anybody Home"	116					Non-album tracks
1963	"Oh Where, Oh Where" b/w "Demons and Witches" (Non-album track)						Songs for a Campus Party
1963	"I'm Falling in Love with a Girl (I Shouldn't Fall in Love with)"" b/w "The Greatest Surfer Couple"						Non-album tracks
1964	"A Letter to the Beatles" b/w "College Cannonball" (from Campus Confidential)	85					Non-album tracks
1964	"I've Known You All My Life" b/w "What Kind of Bird Is That"						Non-album tracks
1964	"The Girl Without a Top" b/w "Two Wrongs Don't Make a Right"						Non-album tracks
1964	"My Love, My Love" b/w "How to Succeed in Love"						Non-album tracks
1965	"I'll Set My Love to Music" b/w "Everlasting"						Non-album tracks
1965	"I'll Never Be the Same" b/w "Our First American Dance"						Non-album tracks
1966	"Something to Remember You By" b/w "Annie in Her Granny"						Non-album tracks
1966	"Let's Call It a Day Girl" b/w "The Girl in the Shade of a Striped Umbrella"						Non-album tracks
1967	"Love of the Common People" b/w "What I Don't Know Can't Hurt Me"						Non-album tracks
1967	"Draft Dodger Rag" b/w "Hitchhiker"						Non-album tracks
