= Dave Somerville =

Canadian singer (1933–2015)

- Born: David Troy Somerville; October 2, 1933; Guelph, Ontario, Canada
- Died: July 14, 2015 (aged 81) Santa Barbara, California, United States
- Occupation: Singer
- Formerly of: The Diamonds
- Website: www.davesomerville.com

David Troy Somerville (October 2, 1933 – July 14, 2015) was a Canadian singer best known as the co-founder, and original lead singer, of The Diamonds, one of the most popular vocal groups of the 1950s.

== Biography ==
Born in Guelph, Ontario, Somerville grew up in a musical family in the nearby farming village of Rockwood, 50 miles west of Toronto. In 1947, at the age of 14, he moved to Toronto with his parents and brother Marc, where he entered Central Tech to study architecture and building construction. He changed the focus of his studies to radio, and in 1952, at the age of 19, secured a position at the Canadian Broadcasting Corporation in the engineering department as a radio operator while concurrently studying voice with Dr. Ernesto Vinci at the University of Toronto's Royal Conservatory of Music.

=== Years with the Diamonds ===
==== Formation of the Diamonds ====
In the hallway of the Canadian Broadcasting Corporation during the fall of 1953, Somerville met by chance an unnamed quartet (Stan Fisher, Ted Kowalski, Phil Levitt and Bill Reed) and soon became their vocal coach. Later that year when Fisher opted for college, Dave became the group’s lead singer. That quartet became The Diamonds.

==== Prominence ====
On August 1, 1955, the group tied for first place on Arthur Godfrey's Talent Scouts in New York City. In February 1956 with the recommendation of Cleveland's genius DJ, Dr. Bill Randle, they signed a long-term contract with Mercury Records. Somerville performed eight years with The Diamonds, singing lead on all sixteen of their Billboard chart selections, peaking with the song "Little Darlin'"; for eight weeks, this selection remained at #2 on the charts, becoming the third best selling single record of 1957. Multiple appearances on American Bandstand, The Perry Como Show, and The Steve Allen Show increased Dave's visibility. In August 1961, he left The Diamonds.

=== Career after the Diamonds ===
==== The 1960s, including the "David Troy" years ====
After leaving the Diamonds, Somerville married Judy Corns of Evansville, Indiana, and began a six-year solo career as a folk artist, using the stage name David Troy. During this period, Somerville also studied acting, with Leonard Nimoy as his teacher, and made numerous guest-starring appearances, often credited as "David Troy", on various television programs.

Around this time, he became one of the clients of the William Morris Agency, which has since merged with the Endeavor Talent Agency to become the present-day William Morris-Endeavor agency. As such, he did extensive voice-over work and was heard in hundreds of radio, television and cable advertisements.

In 1967, Dave joined The Four Preps as a replacement for Ed Cobb, the original bass singer. In 1969, he and Bruce Belland, the Four Preps's original lead singer, concentrated on a folk/comedy act as the duo of Belland & Somerville. As such, they appeared in concert with Henry Mancini and Johnny Mathis and were regulars on The Tim Conway Show, a CBS-TV prime-time comedy series. As songwriters, Bruce and Dave co-wrote "The Troublemaker," which became the title track of two Willie Nelson albums; and the duo sang in a later roster of the Four Preps with Jim Pike of The Lettermen.

==== 1970s and 1980s ====
In 1972, Somerville formed the group WW Fancy, which also included Keith Barbour and Gail Jensen as members. In the late 1980s, he again sang with original members of The Diamonds and also returned to The Four Preps with Bruce Belland, Ed Cobb, and Jim Yester of The Association. In 1972, Somerville sang background vocals along with The Blossoms in B. J. Thomas' version of "Rock and Roll Lullaby".

Somerville's song "The (Ballad of the) Unknown Stuntman," jointly written and composed with Jensen, inspired Glen Larson, who had been the Four Preps's original baritone, to create the central characters and develop the core format of The Fall Guy, for 20th Century Fox Television, which became a highly successful television series for ABC-TV. With additional lyrics written by Larson, "The Unknown Stuntman" became the theme song for The Fall Guy and was sung by series star Lee Majors. Somerville's home in the Hollywood Hills was used as the set for the home of Majors' character, Colt Seavers, throughout the series.

==== 1990s and beyond ====
His first children's album was titled The Cosmic Adventures of Diamond Dave. It contained many original songs and characters and received critical acclaim in the U.S. and Canada. The Diamonds have been honored and inducted into The Vocal Group Hall of Fame, The Doo Wop Hall of Fame, The Rockabilly Hall of Fame and are recipients of Canada's Juno Award.

Somerville's last stage show, On The 1957 Rock & Roll Greyhound Bus, was based on rock and roll’s first major tour. In it, he told road stories and sang the songs of such pioneer jukebox giants as Buddy Holly & The Crickets, Fats Domino, The Everly Brothers, and Chuck Berry.

== Family ==
In 1967, Somerville's only child from his marriage to Corns, David Orlando Somerville, was born.

== Death ==
Somerville died of pancreatic cancer in Santa Barbara, California, on July 14, 2015, at the age of 81.

== Filmography ==
=== Television ===
- Double Dare, Co-Star, NBC
- Automan, Featured, 20th Century Fox
- Fall Guy, Featured, Co-Wrote Theme, Glen Larson Productions
- Misadventures of Sheriff Lobo, Co-Star, Universal
- The Gathering, Star, Metromedia
- Rooster, Principle, 20th Century Fox
- McCloud, Co-Star, Glen Larson Productions
- Star Trek: The Original Series, Featured, Paramount
- Tim Conway Show, Star, CBS
- Steve Allen, Guest Star, NBC
- Merv Griffin Show, Guest Star, KTTV
- Billboard Awards, Star, CBS
- Tonight Show, Guest Star, NBC
- American Bandstand, Guest Star, Dick Clark Productions
- Tony Bennett Show, Guest Star, NBC
- Midnight Special, Guest Star, NBC
- Henry Mancini Special, Guest Star, NBC
- Smothers Bros. Special, Guest Star, NBC
- Spider-Man, principal, Universal
- Perry Como, Guest Star, NBC
- Mike Douglas Show, Guest Star, Mike Douglas Productions
- Doo Wop 51, Star, PBS Special
- Magic Moments, The Best of 50s Pop, Star, PBS Special

=== Films ===
- The Big Beat, Star, Universal
- A Sign of the Times, Star, Orsatti Productions
- The Doberman Gang, Principle, Rosamond Productions

=== Stage ===
- Two Dreams Met, Spence Baldwin, Theatre 206, Los Angeles
- Dew Drop Inn Sam, Cast Theatre, Los Angeles

== Awards as a member of The Diamonds ==
- 1984 Received a Juno Award and inducted into the Canadian Music Hall of Fame.
- October 2004, Inducted into the Vocal Group Hall of Fame in Sharon, Pennsylvania.
- 2006, Inducted into the Doo-Wop Hall of Fame.
