= 26 Miles (Santa Catalina) =

Single by The Four Preps

from the album The Four Preps
- B-side: "It's You"
- Released: 1957
- Genre: Pop
- Length: 2:31
- Label: Capitol
- Songwriter(s): Bruce Belland, Glen Larson

The Four Preps singles chronology
"Dreamy Eyes" (1956)	"26 Miles (Santa Catalina)" (1957)	"Big Man" (1958)

"26 Miles (Santa Catalina)" is a popular song by the 1950s and 1960s pop band The Four Preps. The band's biggest hit, it reached number two on the Billboard Hot 100, number six on the Billboard R&B chart, and number 11 in Canada in 1958. The song sold over a million copies and the group appeared on several television shows, including The Gisele MacKenzie Show (March 15, 1958) and The Ed Sullivan Show.

== Credits ==
- Conductor [Orchestra]: Lincoln Mayorga (tracks: B)
- Writers: Bruce Belland, Glenn Larson*

== History ==
At the age of 15, the band's lead singer Bruce Belland broke his ankle and took up the ukulele to pass the time while recuperating. He learned four chords, which ended up becoming the song's opening music. The chorus was developed some time later when, while body surfing at a California beach, Belland's friend said he could see Santa Catalina 26 miles away. The main theme is summed up in the last line in the refrain, stating that Santa Catalina is "the island of romance", with the word "romance" repeated four times.

== Cover versions ==
The song was covered by Dent May on his album Dent May & His Magnificent Ukulele.

== Influences ==
The song served as an influence to Beach Boys singer Brian Wilson, as well as Jimmy Buffett. Neil Peart, lyricist/drummer of the band Rush, recalls that it is one of the first pop music songs that he remembers listening to as a child, stating "I heard that song many times that year (1958). The chorus echoes readily in memory, with its lilting shuffle."

== In popular culture ==
The song was one of many California-related songs played throughout "Sunshine Plaza" in the original Disney California Adventure.

The song was featured playing on a radio in the opening scene of Bad Times at the El Royale.
