= The Fall Guy =

American television series (1981–1986)

- Genre: Action/adventure
- Created by: Glen A. Larson
- Starring: Lee Majors; Douglas Barr; Heather Thomas; Jo Ann Pflug (1981–1982); Markie Post (1982–1985)
- Theme music composer: Gail Jensen; Glen A. Larson; Dave Somerville
- Opening theme: "Unknown Stuntman" performed by Lee Majors
- Composers: Stu Phillips; Ron Ramin; Frank DeVol; Tom Worrall; Morton Stevens; Dennis McCarthy; Ken Heller (uncredited); William Broughton (uncredited)
- Country of origin: United States
- Original language: English
- No. of seasons: 5
- No. of episodes: 113 (list of episodes)

Production
- Executive producer: Glen A. Larson
- Producers: Robert Janes; Larry Brody; Paul Mason; Harry Thomason; Sam Egan; Andrew Schneider; Lee Majors
- Cinematography: Ben Colman; Michael Hofstein
- Camera setup: Single-camera
- Running time: 47–48 minutes
- Production companies: Glen A. Larson Productions; 20th Century Fox Television

Original release
- Network: ABC
- Release: November 4, 1981 – May 2, 1986

Related
- The Fall Guy (2024 film)

The Fall Guy is an American action-adventure television series produced for ABC and originally broadcast from November 4, 1981, to May 2, 1986. It stars Lee Majors, Douglas Barr, and Heather Thomas as Hollywood stunt performers who moonlight as bounty hunters.

== Plot ==
Colt Seavers (Lee Majors) is a Hollywood stunt man moonlighting as a bounty hunter. He uses his physical skills and knowledge of stunt effects (especially stunts involving cars or his large GMC pickup truck) to capture fugitives and criminals. He is accompanied by his cousin and stuntman-in-training, Howie Munson (Douglas Barr), and by fellow stuntwoman Jody Banks (Heather Thomas).

== Cast ==
- Lee Majors as Colt Seavers
- Douglas Barr as Howie Munson
- Heather Thomas as Jody Banks
- Jo Ann Pflug as Samantha "Big Jack" Jack (1981–1982)
- Markie Post as Terri Shannon / Michaels (1982–1985)

== Production ==
Seavers's truck was a Rounded-Line 1981 GMC K-2500 Wideside with the Sierra Grande equipment package. A Rounded-Line 1980 GMC K-25 Wideside with the High Sierra equipment package was also used. During the show's initial series, the stunts took their toll on the modified production trucks, supplied at low cost to the production by General Motors, so several different years, makes (Chevy/GMC), and models were used during the show's initial run.

From the second season, General Motors supplied three specially adapted trucks for the stunt sequences, with the engine moved to a mid-chassis position immediately under the cab seat.

== Intros ==
The series introductions were mainly composed of scenes from the series itself, and from risky stunt scenes of various films predating 1981. The theme song, "Unknown Stuntman", was sung by Lee Majors and later released as a single.

== Episodes ==
Season	Episodes	Originally released	
Season	Episodes	First released	Last released
1	23	November 4, 1981	May 5, 1982
2	23	October 27, 1982	May 4, 1983
3	23	September 21, 1983	May 2, 1984
4	22	September 19, 1984	April 10, 1985
5	22	September 26, 1985	May 2, 1986

== Home media ==
On June 5, 2007, 20th Century Fox released the first season of The Fall Guy on DVD in Region 1. Season one was released on DVD in Region 2 in Germany and the UK. Season two has also been released in Region 2, in Germany on November 28, 2008, and in the UK on February 16, 2009, all with edits.

DVD Name	Ep #	Release dates		
DVD Name	Ep #	Region 1	Region 2 (UK)	Region 2 (Germany)
The Complete First Season	23	June 5, 2007	June 25, 2007	January 14, 2008
The Complete Second Season	23	November 7, 2008	February 16, 2009	November 28, 2008

== Reception ==
These are the Nielsen ratings.

Season	Rank	Rating
1) 1981–1982	#27	19.0
2) 1982–1983	#14	19.4
3) 1983–1984	#16	19.9
4) 1984–1985	#20	17.1
5) 1985–1986	#80	7.8

== Legacy ==
A board game adaptation of the show was released by the Milton Bradley Company in 1981.

A comic strip adaptation was drawn by Jim Baikie for Look-In magazine.

A video game adaptation was produced by British video game developer Elite Systems in 1984.

It aired in reruns as part of the CBS Late Movie from 1984–85 and went into rerun syndication in the autumn of 1986, which eventually included a run on FX. In 2024, it was added to the H&I schedule in the US, where it continues in 2026. The first two series are available for streaming on Prime Video. During 2025, it was part of the lineup on the Legend channel in the UK, and continues to run on sister network Legend Xtra in 2026.

In September 2020, Universal Pictures announced the film The Fall Guy, loosely based on the television series, starring Ryan Gosling and directed by David Leitch. It was released on May 3, 2024 to positive reviews. Lee Majors and Heather Thomas appear together in a cameo as police officers.

== See also ==
- 1981 in American television
