= Glen A. Larson =

American television producer and writer (1937–2014)

- Larson in 2004
- Born: Glen Albert Larson; January 3, 1937; Long Beach, California, U.S.
- Died: November 14, 2014 (aged 77); Santa Monica, California, U.S.
- Resting place: Rose Hill Burial Park, Oklahoma City, Oklahoma, U.S.
- Occupations: Producer, screenwriter, composer
- Notable work: Quincy, M.E.; Buck Rogers in the 25th Century; Battlestar Galactica; The Fall Guy; Magnum, P.I.; Knight Rider
- Spouses: Carol Jean Gourley (m. 1961; div. 1982); Janet Prescott (m. 1982; div. 2008); Jeannie Marie Pledger (m. 2009)
- Children: 9

Glen Albert Larson (January 3, 1937 – November 14, 2014) was an American television producer, writer, and composer. He created many series, including Alias Smith and Jones; Battlestar Galactica; Buck Rogers in the 25th Century; The Misadventures of Sheriff Lobo; Quincy, M.E.; The Hardy Boys/Nancy Drew Mysteries; B. J. and the Bear; The Fall Guy; Magnum, P.I.; and Knight Rider. Active on television until the early 2010s, he was also a member of the folk revival/satire group The Four Preps.

== Career ==
Larson began his career in the entertainment industry in 1956 as a member of the vocal group The Four Preps, with whom he appeared in one of the Gidget films. The Four Preps ultimately produced three gold records for Capitol, all of which Larson himself wrote and/or composed: "26 Miles (Santa Catalina)", "Big Man", and "Down by the Station". A later member of the Four Preps, David Somerville, and a session singer he knew, Gail Jensen, later collaborated with Larson to write and compose "The Unknown Stuntman", the theme from The Fall Guy; series lead Lee Majors performed this song over the opening titles.

After working for Quinn Martin on productions including The Fugitive (where he had his first writing credit), Larson signed a production deal with Universal Studios. His first hit series was Alias Smith and Jones, a 1971–1973 Western which described the activities of Hannibal Heyes and Jedediah "Kid" Curry, concentrating on their efforts to go straight. (George Roy Hill's film, scripted by William Goldman, about Butch Cassidy and the "Sundance Kid", is commonly believed to have been the inspiration for the series.)

Larson was involved in the development for television of The Six Million Dollar Man, based on Martin Caidin's novel Cyborg; after ABC rejected the original pilot, Larson rewrote it and wrote two 90-minute telefilms that persuaded network executive Barry Diller to greenlight the series, on which he served as an early executive producer.

Larson later secured a then-unprecedented $1 million per episode budget for Battlestar Galactica. The show incorporated many themes from Mormon theology, such as sealing (marriage) for "time and eternity" and a "council of twelve". Larson, a member of the Church of Jesus Christ of Latter-day Saints in real life, had been working on the concept since 1968 with former Star Trek producer Gene L. Coon mentoring him in its early development. Although he originally wanted to name the series Adam's Ark, he instead opted for Galactica. He was later convinced to include the word "star" in the title to capitalize on the recently released film Star Wars, eventually morphing the title into Battlestar Galactica. Larson was similarly convinced to deviate from his plan to produce the property as a series of TV movies to a weekly hour-long series, which caught his crew by surprise with a production schedule more demanding than originally expected in terms of writing while it overwhelmed the series' budgetary limits.

Even with its unprecedented budget, the series was canceled after one season due to high production costs and declining ratings. The pilot episode, titled "Saga of a Star World" was edited into a two-hour theatrical film, and a re-edit of other episodes was released as a second theatrical feature film titled Mission Galactica: The Cylon Attack.

After the series was canceled, ABC agreed to revive the franchise for the 1979–80 season as Galactica 1980, set decades later when the Galactica finally reaches Earth. Accounts of how the revival came about differ: Larson later said he had personally lobbied for it, writing a spec script on speculation and arranging for it to be hand-delivered to ABC's president by way of a stunt involving borrowed hotel bellhop uniforms; story editor Allan Cole instead recalled that ABC had pressured a reluctant Universal into reviving a series that had already cost the studio money. Early plans developed with Donald P. Bellisario used a time-travel premise, which was dropped after the pilot but which Bellisario later revisited as the basis for Quantum Leap. Although intended as an economy measure, the series' per-episode budget ran as high as $1.2 million to $1.5 million against the $600,000 to $700,000 ABC paid to license each episode for its children-oriented Sunday time slot, with Universal absorbing the remainder. Story editors Cole, Chris Bunch, and Robert L. McCullough described a disorganized production in which Larson wrote and rewrote scripts from a condo in Hawaii, with little advance plan for the show's characters or premise; a contemporaneous Starlog feature likewise described a hectic schedule, with multiple episodes in production at once and rewrites continuing through the night. Scheduled in ABC's Sunday "family hour" and bound by content restrictions aimed at children, the series suffered declining ratings and was canceled after 10 episodes.

Larson re-used some of the sets, props, costumes, and effects work from Galactica for the light-hearted sci-fi series Buck Rogers in the 25th Century in 1979. Based on the comic-book character created in 1928 by Philip Francis Nowlan, Larson co-developed the series with Leslie Stevens. The feature-length pilot episode was released as a theatrical film in March 1979 and grossed $21 million at the North American box office. The weekly television series began in September 1979, running for two seasons until April 1981.

In the 1980s, Larson had further success as one of the creators of Magnum, P.I., which ran from 1980 to 1988. Around the same time, he left Universal to work for 20th Century-Fox. Additionally, Larson created The Fall Guy, which ran from 1981 to 1986. Larson's next prominent series was Knight Rider, which featured science-fiction elements with a light-hearted action-adventure scenario and limited violence. These basic elements characterized many of Larson's series throughout the 1980s with Automan, Manimal and The Highwayman, though all of these shows were unsuccessful and none lasted more than a single season. Larson's profile declined, though he made a brief comeback in the 1990s with an adaptation of the Ultraverse comic Night Man, which lasted two seasons.

In 2003, Battlestar Galactica was remade for the Sci-Fi Channel as a miniseries; it was followed by a 2004 series that lasted multiple seasons. When the miniseries was in development, Larson sought a writing credit through Writers Guild of America arbitration; Ronald D. Moore, who developed the new series, later said he felt Larson deserved the credit because the story was essentially the same as Larson's original, just done "in different ways." As a result, Larson received a writing credit on the miniseries under the pseudonym "Christopher Eric James" and a "based on the series created by" credit on every episode of the 2004 series, along with a "Consulting Producer" credit throughout the reimagined franchise as a result of retaining rights to the Battlestar Galactica concept. After the series ended in 2009, a short-lived prequel series, Caprica, followed in 2010. Larson was again not involved, but received a screen credit for the creation of certain characters.

In February 2009, The Hollywood Reporter reported that Larson was in talks with Universal Pictures to bring Battlestar Galactica to the big screen, though any potential feature film would not be based on the 2004 series but would possibly be based on the original series. The project stalled for some time; in 2011 a re-announced version was no longer a continuation of the original series but rather a complete remake.

=== Criticism ===
Despite his success, much criticism has been aimed at Larson for his perceived general lack of originality as many of his television series are seen as small screen "knock-offs" of feature films. Harlan Ellison once referred to him as "Glen Larceny" for the similarities between Larson's shows and cinema blockbusters.

In his autobiography, The Garner Files, James Garner claimed that Larson stole a number of plots of The Rockford Files (which Garner's production company co-produced), then used them for his own shows, simply changing the dialogue minimally and using different character names. Garner's group complained to the Writer's Guild; Larson was fined, and an episode of Larson's series Switch, "Death by Resurrection", had the writing credits revised to give sole credit to the writers of the Rockford Files episode "This Case Is Closed", as it was the basis of the Switch episode. Nevertheless, Garner felt that the fine had taught Larson nothing when he persisted, including copying the theme music from The Rockford Files for one of his shows. Garner stated that when Larson subsequently showed up on the Rockford set, he put his arm around Garner and said: "I hope there are no hard feelings, Jim." After Larson ignored a warning by Garner to take his arm off him, Garner claimed to have punched Larson so hard that Larson "flew across the curb, into a motor home, and out the other side." According to movie and TV expert Thomas "Duke" Miller, during the time it was decided that Garner would be working on a series of two-hour Rockford TV movies, an interviewer asked if Larson would be involved in the production process, Garner replied, "Only if we need a dead body."

=== Lawsuit against Universal Studios ===
In July 2011, Larson began a lawsuit against Universal Studios, alleging a decades-long fraud and claimed the studio had not paid him a share of the profits owed from the television shows he produced while working with them. Larson's involvement with Universal had begun in the 1970s, and his contractual agreement had secured him net profits from the revenues generated by the shows he worked on as a producer, including The Six Million Dollar Man, Quincy, M.E., Battlestar Galactica, Buck Rogers in the 25th Century, Magnum, P.I. and Knight Rider. The dispute was settled in 2015.

This was not the first legal wrangle Larson had with the studio, as there had previously been a disagreement over ownership of rights to the Battlestar Galactica franchise. It was ultimately determined that Larson no longer owned the television rights to the property, but retained feature film rights.

== Death ==
Larson died on November 14, 2014, in UCLA Medical Center, Santa Monica, California, from esophageal cancer, aged 77 and was survived by his wife Jeannie and nine children. He is buried at Rose Hill Burial Park (Oklahoma City, Oklahoma).

== Awards and honors ==
- Emmy Award
  - 1974: Nominated for Outstanding Limited Series, for McCloud (shared with Michael Gleason and Ron Satlof)
  - 1975: Nominated for Outstanding Limited Series, for McCloud (shared with Michael Gleason and Ron Satlof)
  - 1978: Nominated for Outstanding Drama Series, for Quincy, M.E.
- Grammy Award
  - 1979: Nominated for Best Album of Original Score Written for a Motion Picture or Television Special, for Battlestar Galactica (nomination shared with Stu Phillips, John Andrew Tartaglia, and Sue Collins)
- Edgar Award
  - 1973: Won for Best Episode in a TV Series Teleplay, for McCloud, "The New Mexico Connection"
  - 1981: Won for Best Episode in a TV Series Teleplay, for Magnum, P.I., "China Doll" (with Donald P. Bellisario)

Larson also has a star on the Hollywood Walk of Fame for his contributions to the television industry.

== Filmography ==
Title	Year	Director	Writer	Producer	Creator	Composer	Notes
The Fugitive	1966		Yes				
Twelve O'Clock High	1966		Yes				
It Takes a Thief	1968–70	Yes	Yes	Yes			
The Virginian	1970–71		Yes	Yes			
McCloud	1970–77		Yes	Yes		Yes	
Alias Smith and Jones	1971–73		Yes	Yes	Yes		
The Six Million Dollar Man	1973		Yes	Yes		Yes	2 additional television films
Fools, Females and Fun	1974			Yes	Yes	Yes	Unsold pilot
Get Christie Love!	1975	Yes	Yes	Yes			
Switch	1975–78	Yes	Yes	Yes	Yes	Yes	
Quincy, M.E.	1976–83		Yes	Yes	Yes	Yes	
Benny and Barney: Las Vegas Undercover	1977		Yes	Yes			Television film
Hardy Boys/Nancy Drew Mysteries	1977–78	Yes	Yes	Yes	Yes	Yes	
Evening in Byzantium	1978		Yes	Yes			Mini-series
The Islander	1978		Yes	Yes			Television film
A Double Life	1978		Yes	Yes			Television film
Battlestar Galactica	1978–79		Yes	Yes	Yes	Yes	Pilot also theatrical release
Sword of Justice	1978–79		Yes	Yes	Yes	Yes	
Cliffhangers: The Secret Empire	1979			Yes			
Buck Rogers in the 25th Century	1979		Yes	Yes		Yes	Theatrical film
Buck Rogers in the 25th Century	1979–81		Yes	Yes	Yes	Yes	
The Misadventures of Sheriff Lobo	1979–81		Yes	Yes	Yes	Yes	
B. J. and the Bear	1979–81		Yes	Yes	Yes	Yes	
Battles: The Murder That Wouldn't Die	1980		Yes	Yes		Yes	Unsold pilot
Galactica 1980	1980		Yes	Yes	Yes	Yes	
Nightside	1980		Yes	Yes			Unsold pilot
Magnum, P.I.	1980–88		Yes	Yes	Yes		
Fitz and Bones	1981–82		Yes	Yes			
The Fall Guy	1981–86		Yes	Yes	Yes	Yes	
Rooster	1982		Yes	Yes			Unsold pilot
Simon & Simon	1982		Yes				
Knight Rider	1982–86		Yes	Yes	Yes	Yes	
Manimal	1983		Yes	Yes	Yes		
Trauma Center	1983			Yes	Yes		
Automan	1983–84		Yes	Yes	Yes		
Masquerade	1983–84		Yes	Yes	Yes		
Cover Up	1984–85		Yes	Yes	Yes		
Half Nelson	1985		Yes		Yes		
In Like Flynn	1985		Yes	Yes		Yes	Unsold pilot
Crazy Dan	1986		Yes				Unsold pilot
The Highwayman	1987–88		Yes	Yes			
The Road Raiders	1989		Yes	Yes		Yes	Television film
Chameleons	1989	Yes	Yes	Yes			Unsold pilot
P.S. I Luv U	1991–92		Yes	Yes	Yes	Yes	
Staying Afloat	1993		Yes				Television film
One West Waikiki	1994–96			Yes	Yes		
Team Knight Rider	1997–98			Yes			
Night Man	1997–99	Yes	Yes	Yes	Yes	Yes	
The Darwin Conspiracy	1999		Yes	Yes			Television film
Millennium Man	1999		Yes	Yes			Television film
Battlestar Galactica	2003–09		Yes	Yes			Including miniseries, TV movies (1, 2) & web-series
Knight Rider	2008–09			Yes			
Caprica	2009–10			Yes			"Characters by" credit
Battlestar Galactica: Blood & Chrome	2012			Yes			Web series

== Books written ==
Title	Year	Co-writer	Followed series	Notes
The Hardy Boys and Nancy Drew Meet Dracula	1977	Michael Sloan	Hardy Boys/Nancy Drew Mysteries	Novelization for two same name episode
Battlestar Galactica	1978	Robert Thurston	Battlestar Galactica (1978)	Novelization for three-part pilot episode "Saga of a Star World"
The Cylon Death Machine	1979	Robert Thurston	Battlestar Galactica (1978)	Novelization for two episodes "The Gun on Ice Planet Zero"
The Tombs of Kobol	1979	Robert Thurston	Battlestar Galactica (1978)	Novelization for two episodes "Lost Planet of the Gods"
The Young Warriors	1980	Robert Thurston	Battlestar Galactica (1978)	Novelization for episode "The Young Lords"
Galactica Discovers Earth	1980	Michael Resnick	Galactica 1980	Novelization for three same name episodes
The Living Legend	1982	Simon Hawke	Battlestar Galactica (1978)	Novelization for two same name episodes
War of the Gods	1982	Simon Hawke	Battlestar Galactica (1978)	Novelization for two same name episodes
Greetings from Earth	1983	Ron Goulart	Battlestar Galactica (1978)	Novelization for two-part same name episode
Knight Rider	1983	Roger Hill	Knight Rider (1982)	Novelization for two-part pilot episode "Knight of the Phoenix"
Trust Doesn't Rust	1984	Roger Hill	Knight Rider (1982)	Novelization for same name episode
Experiment in Terra	1984	Ron Goulart	Battlestar Galactica (1978)	Novelization for episodes "Baltar's Escape" and "Experiment in Terra"
Hearts of Stone	1984	Roger Hill	Knight Rider (1982)	Novelization for same name episode
The 24-Carat Assassin	1984	Roger Hill	Knight Rider (1982)	Novelization for two-part episode "Mouth of the Snake/All That Glitters"
Mirror Image	1984	Roger Hill	Knight Rider (1982)	Novelization for two-part episode "Goliath"
The Long Patrol	1984	Ron Goulart	Battlestar Galactica (1978)	Novelization for same name episode
The Nightmare Machine	1985	Robert Thurston	No	Original Battlestar Galactica novel
"Die, Chameleon!"	1986	Robert Thurston	No	Original Battlestar Galactica novel
Apollo's War	1987	Robert Thurston	No	Original Battlestar Galactica novel
Surrender the Galactica!	1988	Robert Thurston	No	Original Battlestar Galactica novel
