= Alouette (song) =

Popular French-Canadian children's song

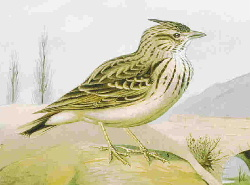

Song
- Language: French
- Written: 1879
- Genre: Folk
- Songwriter: Traditional

"Alouette" ([aluɛt(ə)]) is a popular Quebecois children's song, commonly thought to be about plucking the feathers from a lark. Although it is in French, it is well known among speakers of other languages; in this respect, it is similar to "Frère Jacques". Many Allied soldiers learned the song while serving in France during World War I and took it home with them, passing it on to their children and grandchildren.

Although "alouette" is pronounced [alwɛt(ə)] as two or three (when the final e muet is pronounced) syllables in Standard French, it is more commonly pronounced [aluɛt(ə)] as three or four syllables in Quebec French, as mirrored by the first four notes of the melody.

== History ==
The song's origin is A Pocket Song Book for the Use of Students and Graduates of McGill College (Montreal, 1879). Canadian folklorist Marius Barbeau thought that the song came from France, though the first printed copy in France came 14 years after the original Canadian (McGill) publication.

The Canadian theory links the song to the North American French fur trade. Canoes were used to transport trade goods in exchange for furs through large trade routes consisting of interconnected lakes, rivers, and portages in what is present-day Canada and the United States. The songs of the French fur trade were adapted to accompany the motion of paddles dipped in unison. Singing helped to pass the time and made the work seem lighter. In fact, it is likely that the Montreal Agents and Wintering Partners (precursor to the North West Company of fur traders) sought out and preferred to hire voyageurs who liked to sing and were good at it. They believed that singing helped the voyageurs to paddle faster and longer. French colonists ate horned larks, which they considered a game bird.

"Alouette" has become a symbol of French Canada for the world, an unofficial national song. The Royal Canadian Air Force's 425 Tactical Fighter Squadron is nicknamed the "Alouette" squadron, and its motto is "Je te plumerai." Additionally, the Canadian Football League's team in Montreal, the Alouettes was specifically named in honour of the song.

Today, the song is used to teach French and English-speaking children in Canada, and others learning French around the world, the names of body parts. Singers will point to or touch the part of their body that corresponds to the word being sung in the song.

Ethnomusicologist Conrad Laforte points out that, in song, the lark (l'alouette) is the bird of the morning, and that it is the first bird to sing in the morning, hence waking up lovers and causing them to part, and waking up others as well, something that is not always appreciated. In French songs, the lark also has the reputation of being a gossip, a know-it-all, and cannot be relied on to carry a message, as it will tell everyone; it also carries bad news. However, the nightingale, being the first bird of spring, in Europe, sings happily all the time, during the lovely seasons of spring and summer. The nightingale (rossignol) also carries messages faithfully and dispenses advice, in Latin, no less, a language that lovers understand. Laforte explains that this alludes to the Middle Ages when only a select few still understood Latin. And so, as the lark makes lovers part or wakes up the sleepyhead, this would explain why the singer of "Alouette" wants to pluck it in so many ways if he can catch it, for, as Laforte notes, this bird is flighty as well.

The lark was eaten in Europe, and when eaten was known as a mauviette, which is also a term for a sickly person.

== Lyrics ==
"Alouette" usually involves audience participation, with the audience echoing every line of each verse after the verse's second line. It is a cumulative song, with each verse built on top of the previous verses, much like the English carol "The Twelve Days of Christmas".

Below are the original French lyrics along with a literal English translation.

Refrain:
Alouette, gentille alouette,
Alouette, je te plumerai.

1. Je te plumerai la tête. (×2)
Et la tête! (×2)
Alouette! (×2)
A-a-a-ah
Refrain

2. Je te plumerai le bec. (×2)
Et le bec! (×2)
Et la tête! (×2)
Alouette! (×2)
A-a-a-ah
Refrain

3. ... les yeux
4. ... le cou
5. ... les ailes
6. ... les pattes
7. ... la queue
8. ... le dos

Refrain:
Lark, nice lark,
Lark, I will pluck you.

1. I will pluck your head. (×2)
And your head! (×2)
Lark! (×2)
A-a-a-ah
Refrain

2. I will pluck your beak. (×2)
And your beak! (×2)
And your head! (×2)
Lark! (×2)
A-a-a-ah
Refrain

3. ... your eyes
4. ... your neck
5. ... your wings
6. ... your legs
7. ... your tail
8. ... your back

== Adaptations ==
- Allan Sherman performed a song about 1950s television called "Al & Yetta" to the tune of "Alouette".
- The English composer Benjamin Britten adapted the tune for part of his 1939 orchestral composition Canadian Carnival.
- The tune of the chorus has been adapted to make the tune of the children's song "Down by the Station".
- In 1952 the Tom and Jerry short "The Two Mouseketeers", Nibbles, a mouse character, sings "Alouette" while making a sandwich. This cartoon is one of the six Tom and Jerry shorts to win an Academy Award.
- In 1955, Pete Seeger an American folk singer released the album Camp Songs with an adaptation of Alouette, called If all the Raindrops.
- The melody for the sung parts of "Little Bunny Foo Foo" is taken from "Alouette".
- In the film Blue Hawaii (1961), Elvis Presley is singing the song "Almost Always True", based on the melody of Alouette.
- The song was interpolated into Cheryl Cole's UK number one single "Promise This" on her second album Messy Little Raindrops.
- In 2010, Saskatoon radio station CJDJ-FM made a parody called "We Hate The Alouettes" in commemoration of the 98th Grey Cup in Edmonton.
- There are two Vietnamese versions of this song. However, neither of them mentions the killing of the lark. Both are only about playing with the lark. One of the songs was printed in Vietnamese music textbook for second-graders in the name "Chú chim nhỏ dễ thương" (The cute small bird).

== See also ==
- Alouette (chanson) — French Wikipedia
