= Eremophila =

Eremophila may refer to:

- Eremophila (bird), the horned larks
- Eremophila (plant), a plant genus of the family Scrophulariaceae
