= Frou Frou (disambiguation) =

Frou Frou is a British musical group.

Frou Frou, Frou-Frou, or Fru Fru may also refer to:

== Film, stage, and television ==
- Frou-Frou (film) (1955), a French film directed by Augusto Genina
- Frou-Frou (play), English adaptation of an 1869 French comedy
- Frou-Frou (1923), a film directed by Guy du Fresnay
- Miss Fru Fru, an episode of the Cartoon Network animated series, Camp Lazlo

== Fictional characters ==
- Le Comte de Frou Frou, a minor Blackadder character
- Frou-Frou, the horse in Disney's The Aristocats
- Frou-Frou, Vronsky's steeplechase mare in Anna Karenina
- Fru Fru, an arctic shrew from the Disney animated film Zootopia
- Furu Furu, a character in the anime series Majokko Megu-chan whose name is spelled "Fru Fru" in Italian translations

== Music ==
- "Fru Fru", a song by Gene Ammons from Free Again

== See also ==
- Little Bunny Foo Foo
