= Road Trips Volume 4 Number 2 =

Live album by Grateful Dead
- Released: February 1, 2011
- Recorded: March 31 – April 1, 1988
- Genre: Rock
- Length: 237:34
- Label: Rhino
- Producers: David Lemieux; Blair Jackson

Grateful Dead chronology
Road Trips Volume 4 Number 1 (2010)	Road Trips Volume 4 Number 2 (2011)	Flashback with the Grateful Dead (2011)

Road Trips Volume 4 Number 2 is a live album by the rock band the Grateful Dead. The 14th of the Road Trips series of archival releases, it was recorded on March 31 and April 1, 1988, at the Brendan Byrne Arena in East Rutherford, New Jersey. It was released as a three disc CD on February 1, 2011.

Road Trips Volume 4 Number 2, subtitled April Fools' '88, includes the complete April 1 concert, along with the second set, encore, and two songs from the first set of the March 31 concert. It was only the second live Dead album that was recorded in 1988; the first was Grateful Dead Download Series Volume 5.

The April 1 performance of Bob Dylan's "Ballad of a Thin Man" had been previously released on Postcards of the Hanging.

== Critical reception ==
Professional ratings
Review scores
Source	Rating
Allmusic	3/5 stars
The Music Box	4/5 stars

In Allmusic, Jeff Tamarkin gave Road Trips Volume 4 Number 2 three stars out of five, and wrote a somewhat unfavorable review, saying, "... it would seem that those newbies to the scene were witnessing a band that was offering diminishing returns. From the evidence present on this three-CD compendium of tracks recorded in East Rutherford, N.J., on March 31 and April 1, 1988, the Dead had become more or less predictable and somewhat frayed. That isn't to say there aren't moments of inspiration and near-brilliance here.... " He concluded, "This Road Trips volume is far from a disaster, and Grateful Dead loyalists who remember the era fondly are likely to overlook the flaws and enjoy it for what it is. But anyone just discovering this iconic American band would be far better off with one of the classic Dick's Picks sets dating from the early '70s."

In All About Jazz, Doug Collette was more positive, writing, "Near the end of the '80s, the Grateful Dead was ascending to a pinnacle of performing comparable to its best days in the previous two decades. On disc two, the ambitious interweaving of vintage original material, as well as covers including Traffic's "Dear Mr. Fantasy" (sung so emotively by keyboardist Brent Mydland), benefits tremendously from the excellent recording originally overseen by engineer Dan Healy. In addition, Jeffrey Norman's HDCD mastering brings out the detail in the septet's musicianship, including the snappy interaction between drummers Bill Kreutzmann and Mickey Hart — and not just on [the] pithy "Rhythm Devils"/"Space" interval, but their locked in tandem work during "I Need a Miracle."

Writing in The Music Box, John Metzger was even more enthusiastic, saying, "Beautifully replicated on Road Trips, Vol. 4, No. 2 — where the April Fools' Day gig is paired with material from the preceding night — the group's performance at New Jersey's Brendan Byrne Arena was simply spectacular.... As Road Trips, Vol. 4, No. 2 attests, the Grateful Dead certainly was on an upswing in 1988, one which would last for several years. Whether navigating the hilly terrain that linked "China Cat Sunflower" with "I Know You Rider"; the intoxicated, funky jazz that connected "Estimated Prophet" to "Eyes of the World"; or the frenetically propulsive bluegrass of "Cumberland Blues", the members of the Grateful Dead were fully in synch. Fueled by sobriety, new material, and — for the first time in its career — a hit record, the outfit almost seemed to be making amends for the time it lost during the first half of the decade. Things were certainly good in the world of the Grateful Dead."

== Track listing ==
=== Disc one ===
April 1 – First set:

1. "Mississippi Half-Step Uptown Toodeloo" > (Jerry Garcia, Robert Hunter) – 10:10
  - with "Little Bunny Foo Foo" tuning
2. "Jack Straw" > (Bob Weir, Hunter) – 5:19
3. "To Lay Me Down" (Garcia, Hunter) – 8:29
4. "Ballad of a Thin Man" (Bob Dylan) – 6:52
5. "When Push Comes to Shove" (Hunter, Garcia) – 4:50
6. "New Minglewood Blues" (traditional, arranged by Weir) – 7:48
7. "Cumberland Blues" (Garcia, Phil Lesh, Hunter) – 5:51
8. "Deal" (Garcia, Hunter) – 7:07

March 31 – First set:

9. "When I Paint My Masterpiece" (Dylan) – 5:00
10. "Let It Grow" (Weir, John Perry Barlow) – 12:06

April 1 – Encore:

11. "Brokedown Palace" (Garcia, Hunter) – 5:21

=== Disc two ===
March 31 – Second set:

1. "Scarlet Begonias" > (Garcia, Hunter) – 8:05
2. "Fire on the Mountain" (Mickey Hart, Hunter) – 11:35
3. "Samson and Delilah" (traditional, arranged by Weir) – 6:40
4. "Terrapin Station" > (Garcia, Hunter) – 11:41
5. "Rhythm Devils" > (Hart, Bill Kreutzmann) – 5:52
6. "Space" > (Garcia, Lesh, Weir) – 6:22
7. "Goin' Down the Road Feeling Bad" > (traditional, arranged by Grateful Dead) – 6:17
8. "I Need a Miracle" > (Weir, Barlow) – 3:21
9. "Dear Mr. Fantasy" > (Jim Capaldi, Chris Wood, Steve Winwood) – 4:20
10. "Hey Jude" > (John Lennon, Paul McCartney) – 1:41
11. "All Along the Watchtower" (Dylan) – 4:45

March 31 – Encore:

12. "Knockin' on Heaven's Door" (Dylan) – 8:30

=== Disc three ===
April 1 – Second set:

1. "China Cat Sunflower" > (Garcia, Hunter) – 6:19
2. "I Know You Rider" (traditional, arranged by Grateful Dead) – 5:37
3. "Estimated Prophet" > (Weir, Barlow) – 12:36
4. "Eyes of the World" > (Garcia, Hunter) – 8:55
5. "Rhythm Devils" > (Hart, Kreutzmann) – 7:00
6. "Space" > (Garcia, Lesh, Weir) – 8:33
7. "The Other One" > (Weir, Kreutzmann) – 7:19
8. "Wharf Rat" > (Garcia, Hunter) – 7:55
9. "Throwing Stones" > (Weir, Barlow) – 9:05
10. "Not Fade Away" (Norman Petty, Charles Hardin) – 5:57

== Personnel ==
=== Grateful Dead ===
- Jerry Garcia – lead guitar, vocals
- Mickey Hart – drums
- Bill Kreutzmann – drums
- Phil Lesh – electric bass, vocals
- Brent Mydland – keyboards, vocals
- Bob Weir – rhythm guitar, vocals

=== Production ===
- Produced for release by David Lemieux and Blair Jackson
- CD mastering by Jeffrey Norman
- Recorded by Dan Healy
- Cover art by Scott McDougall
- Photos by James B. Anderson and Bob Minkin
- Package design by Steve Vance
- "Somewhere in the Swamps of Jersey" liner essay by Gary Lambert

== Set lists ==
Following are the full set lists from the March 30, March 31, and April 1, 1988 concerts at the Brendan Byrne Arena.

Wednesday, March 30

- First Set: "Bertha" > "Greatest Story Ever Told" > "Hey Pocky Way", "West L.A. Fadeaway", "Queen Jane Approximately", "Big Railroad Blues", "Cassidy" > "Don't Ease Me In"
- Second Set: "Shakedown Street" > "Looks Like Rain", "Uncle John's Band" > "Playing in the Band" > "Uncle John's Band" > "Rhythm Devils" > "Space" > "The Wheel" > "Gimme Some Lovin' " > "Morning Dew" > "Turn On Your Love Light"
- Encore: "Black Muddy River"

Thursday, March 31

- First Set: "Hell in a Bucket" > "Sugaree", "Me and My Uncle" > "Mexicali Blues", "Brown Eyed Women", "When I Paint My Masterpiece"*, "Ramble On Rose", "Let It Grow"*
- Second Set: "Scarlet Begonias"* > "Fire on the Mountain"* > "Samson and Delilah"*, "Terrapin Station"* > "Rhythm Devils"* > "Space"* > "Goin' Down the Road Feeling Bad"* > "I Need a Miracle"* > "Dear Mr. Fantasy"* > "Hey Jude"* > "All Along the Watchtower"*
- Encore: "Knockin' on Heaven's Door"*

Friday, April 1

- First Set: "Little Bunny Foo Foo" tuning*, "Mississippi Half-Step Uptown Toodeloo"* > "Jack Straw"* > "To Lay Me Down"*, "Ballad of a Thin Man"*, "When Push Comes to Shove"*, "New Minglewood Blues"*, "Cumberland Blues"*, "Deal"*
- Second Set: "China Cat Sunflower"* > "I Know You Rider"*, "Estimated Prophet"* > "Eyes of the World"* > "Rhythm Devils"* > "Space"* > "The Other One"* > "Wharf Rat"* > "Throwing Stones"* > "Not Fade Away"*
- Encore: "Brokedown Palace"*

* Included in Road Trips Volume 4 Number 2
