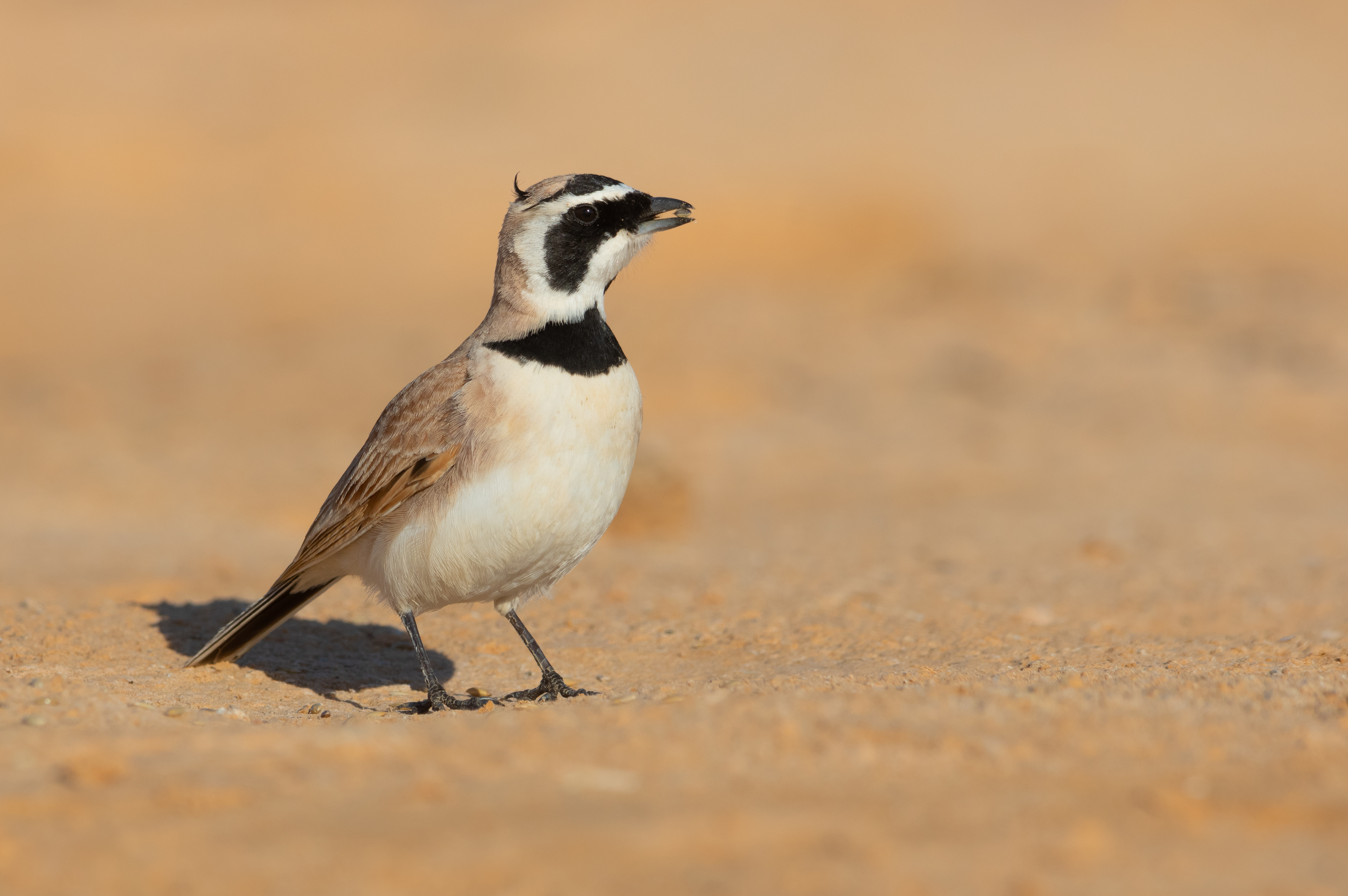

Conservation status
- Least Concern (IUCN 3.1)

Scientific classification
- Kingdom: Animalia
- Phylum: Chordata
- Class: Aves
- Order: Passeriformes
- Family: Alaudidae
- Genus: Eremophila
- Species: E. bilopha

Binomial name
- Eremophila bilopha (Temminck, 1823)
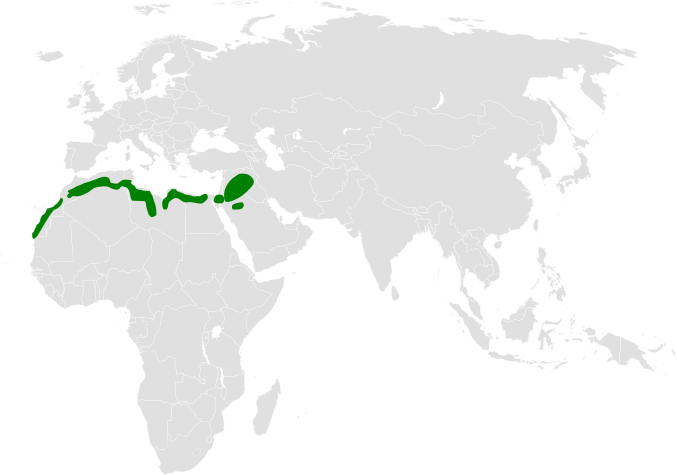

Synonyms
- Alauda bilopha

= Temminck's lark =

Species of bird

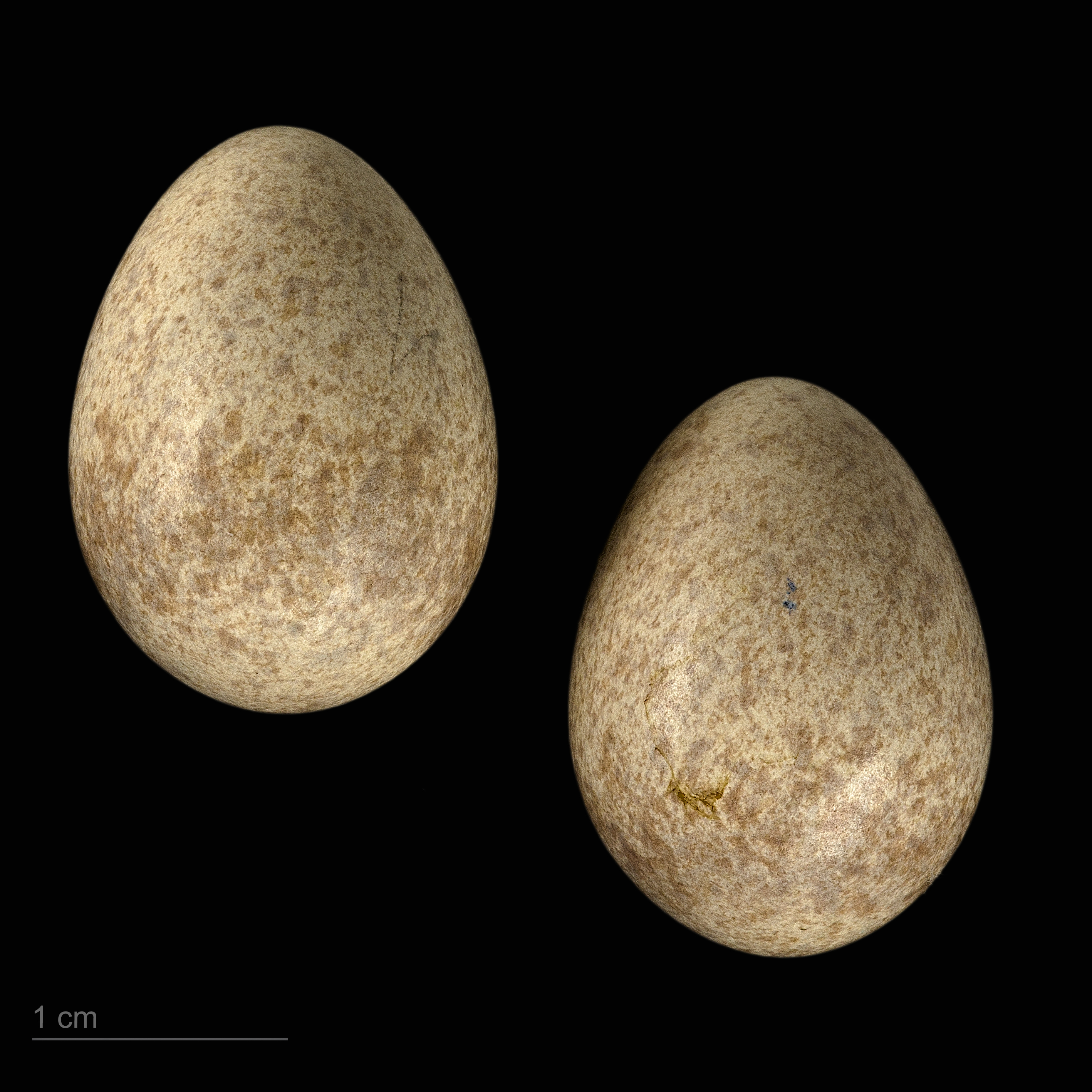
Eremophila bilopha - MHNT

Temminck's lark (Eremophila bilopha) or Temminck's horned lark is a bird species of the family Alaudidae. It breeds across much of north Africa, through northern Saudi Arabia to western Iraq. It is mainly resident, but some populations of this passerine bird are partially migratory, moving further south in winter. This bird's common name commemorates the Dutch naturalist Coenraad Jacob Temminck. The population is declining in Israel and may also be declining elsewhere, probably as a result of habitat loss. Nevertheless, this is a common bird in many parts of its wide range and the International Union for Conservation of Nature has rated its conservation status as being of "least concern".

== Taxonomy and systematics ==
Temminck's lark was originally placed in the genus Alauda before being re-classified to Eremophila.

== Description ==
Unlike most other larks, Temminck's lark is a distinctive looking species on the ground, similar to the other, larger, member of its genus, the horned lark. The 14 to 15 cm (5.5 to 5.9 in) adult is mainly reddish brown-grey above and pale below, and it has a striking black and white face pattern and a distinctive black patch on its breast. The summer male has black "horns", which give this species its alternative name. The juvenile of this species is reddish above and pale below, quite unlike the juvenile horned lark. The adult Temminck's lark differs from the horned lark in its reddish, rather than brown-grey plumage, and the lack of yellow in the face pattern. It has a similar but less harsh metallic call.

== Distribution and habitat ==
Temminck's lark is native to North Africa and the Middle East. Its range includes Algeria, Egypt, Iraq, Israel, Jordan, Kuwait, Libya, Mauritania, Morocco, Saudi Arabia, Syria, Tunisia and Western Sahara.

This lark is a bird of open stony semi-desert. Its nest is on the ground, with two to four eggs being laid. Its food is seeds supplemented with insects in the breeding season.
