= Eremophila prealpestris =

Eremophila prealpestris Temporal range: Piacenzian

Scientific classification
- Kingdom: Animalia
- Phylum: Chordata
- Class: Aves
- Order: Passeriformes
- Family: Alaudidae
- Genus: Eremophila
- Species: †E. prealpestris

Binomial name
- †Eremophila prealpestris Boev, 2012

Extinct species of bird

Eremophila prealpestris is an extinct species of lark in the genus Eremophila that lived in Bulgaria during the Neogene period.
