= Meadowlands Arena =

Arena in New Jersey, United States

- The Meadowlands
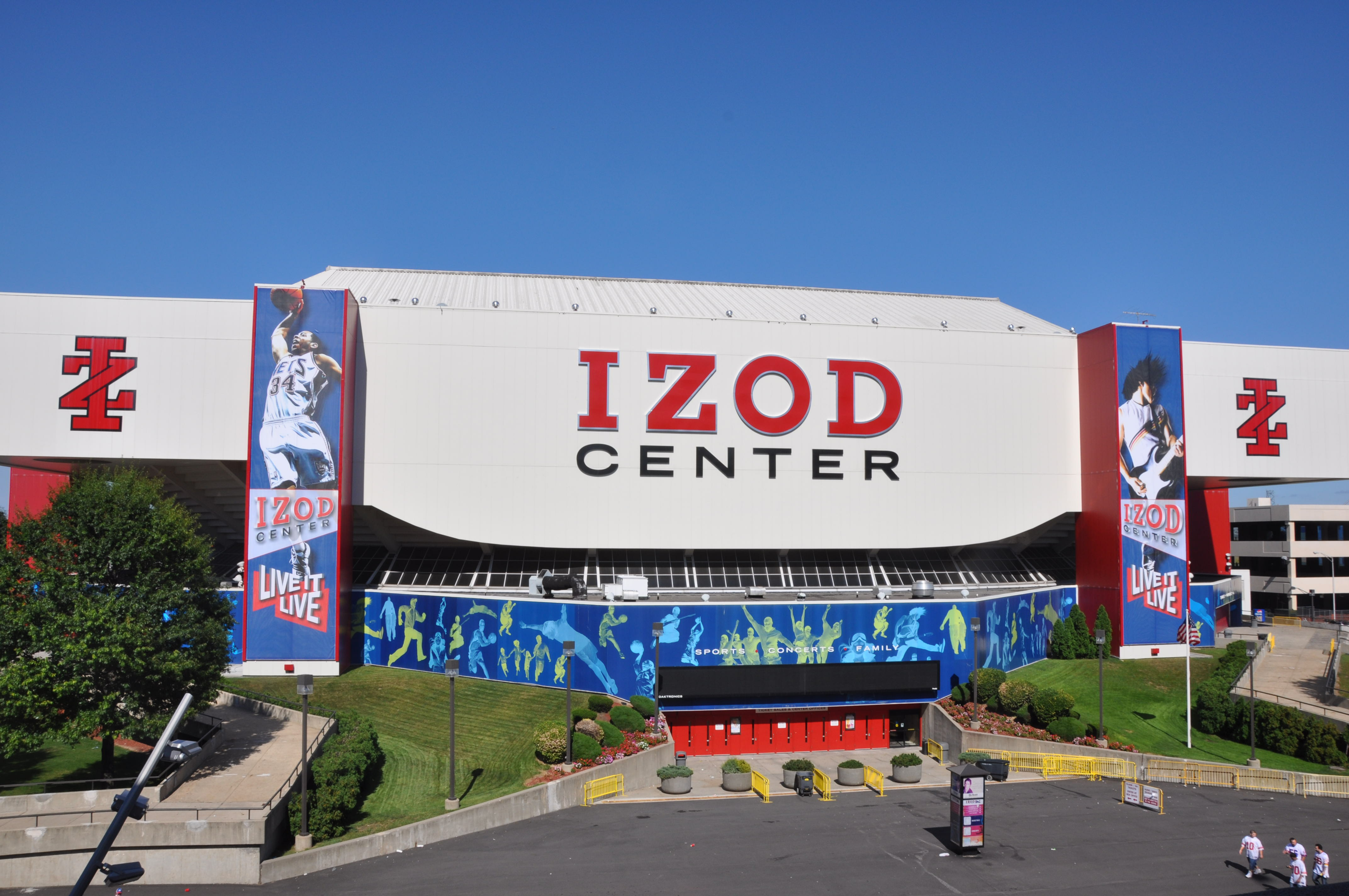
- Meadowlands Arena while it was known as Izod Center
- Interactive map of Meadowlands Arena
- Former names: Brendan Byrne Arena (1981–1996); Continental Airlines Arena (1996–2007); Izod Center (2007–2015)
- Address: 50 New Jersey Route 120
- Location: East Rutherford, New Jersey
- Coordinates: 40°48′42″N 74°4′3″W
- Owner: New Jersey Sports and Exposition Authority
- Operator: New Jersey Sports and Exposition Authority
- Capacity: 20,049 (NBA basketball); 20,029 (NCAA basketball); 19,040 (hockey); 20,000 (concerts); 7,500 (theater concerts)
- Public transit: Meadowlands (select events) Meadowlands Rail Line

Construction
- Groundbreaking: February 2, 1979
- Opened: July 2, 1981
- Closed: April 3, 2015
- Cost: US$85 million ($301 million in 2014 dollars)
- Architects: Grad Partnership; Dilullo, Clauss, Ostroki & Partners
- Project manager: George A. Fuller Company
- General contractor: Terminal Construction Corporation

Tenants
- New Jersey Nets (NBA) (1981–2010); New Jersey Rockets (MISL) (1981–1982); New York Cosmos (NASL Indoor/MISL) (1981–1985); New Jersey Devils (NHL) (1982–2007); Seton Hall Pirates (NCAA) (1985–2007); New Jersey Saints (EPBLL) (1987–1988); New Jersey Rockin' Rollers (RHI) (1994–1997); New Jersey Red Dogs/Gladiators (AFL) (1997–2002); New Jersey Storm (NLL) (2001–2003)

Website
- www.meadowlands.com

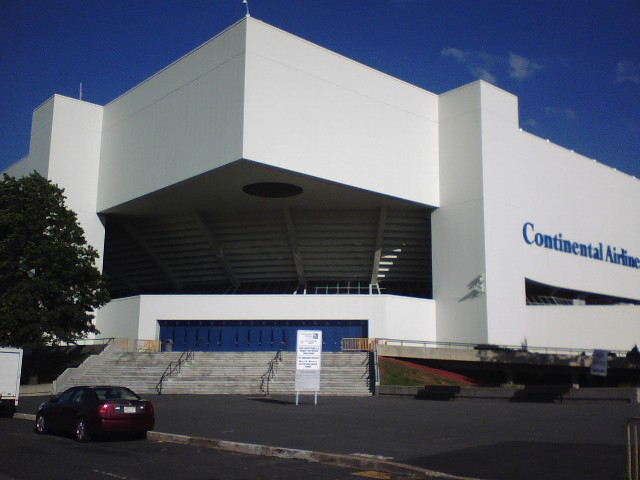
The arena's architecture features sharp, cantilevered corners which also serve as the entrance gates.

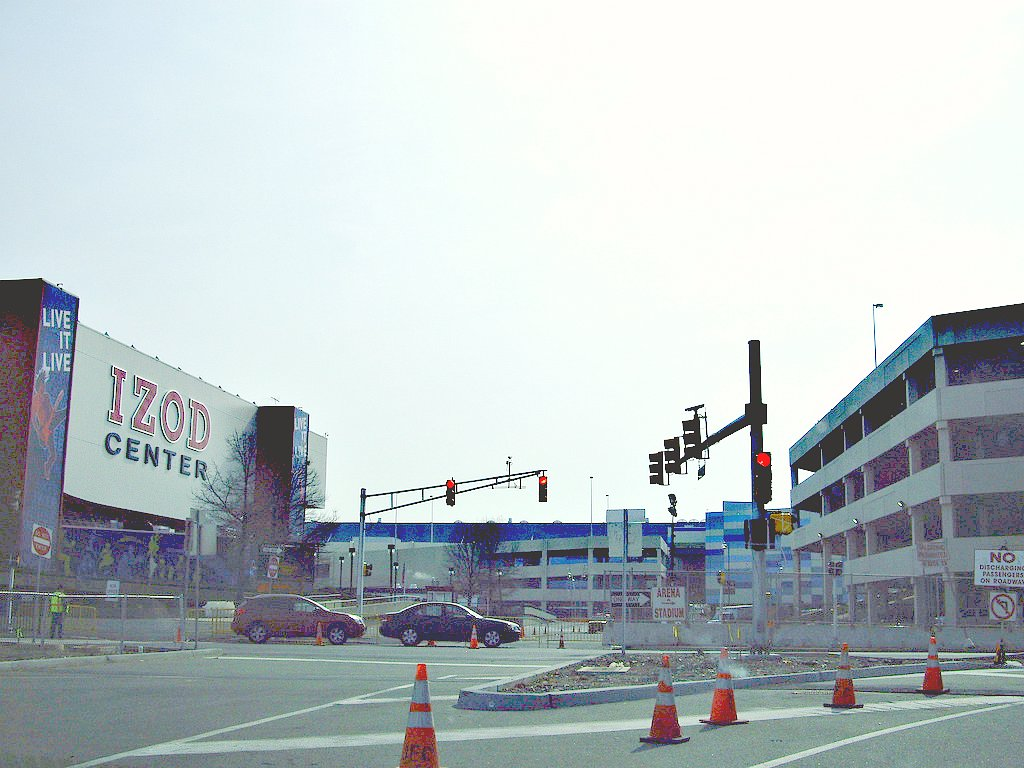
The Izod Center with the under-construction Meadowlands Xanadu, now called American Dream Meadowlands on March 14, 2009

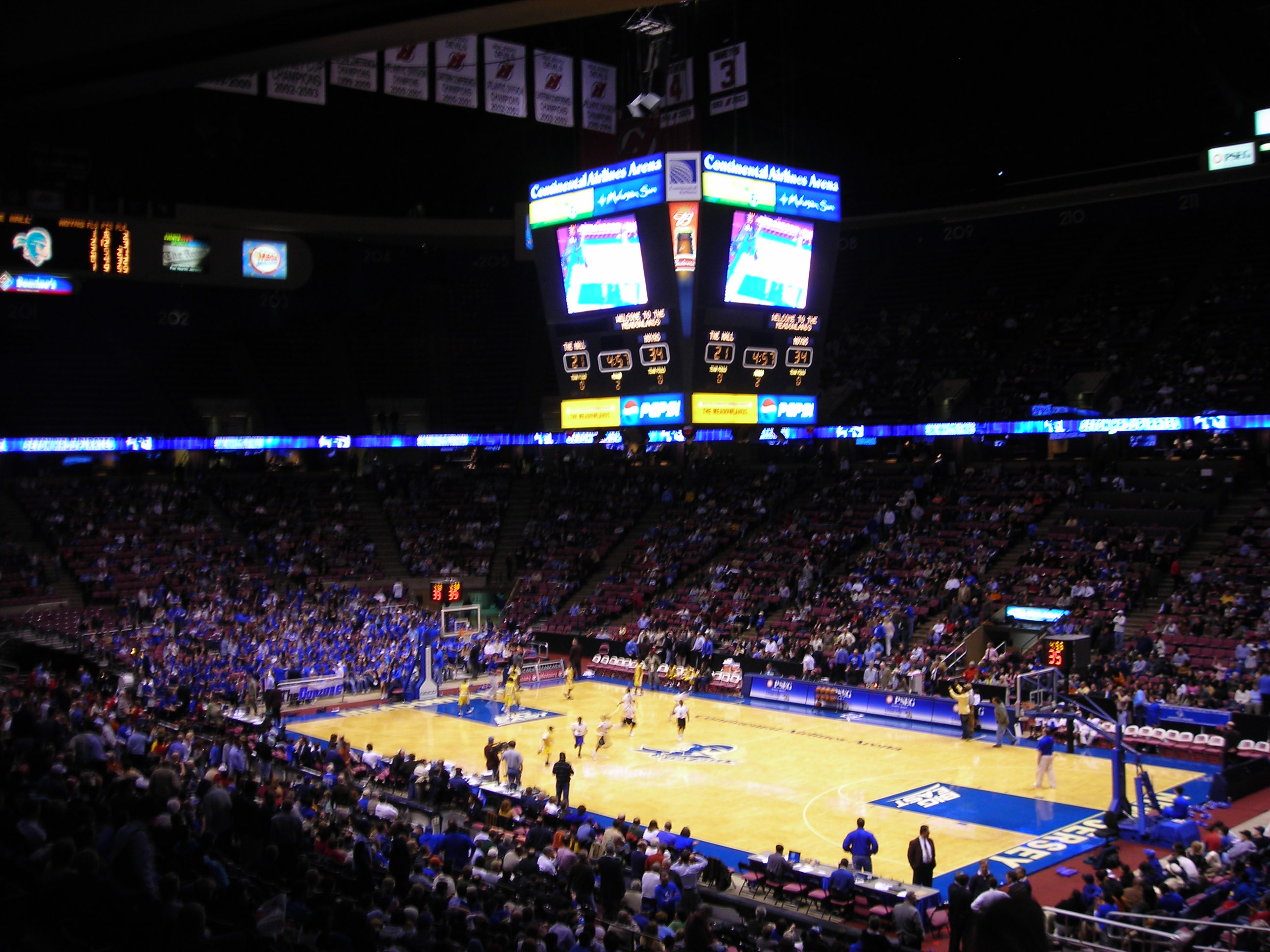
The arena, when it was named Continental Airlines Arena, during a Seton Hall college basketball game

Meadowlands Arena (which was formerly known as Brendan Byrne Arena, Continental Airlines Arena and Izod Center) is a closed indoor sports and concert venue located in the Meadowlands Sports Complex in East Rutherford, New Jersey, United States. Since closing, the state-owned facility has been used as a rehearsal stage by major concert-touring music stars and by NBCUniversal for television filming. The arena is located on New Jersey Route 120 across the highway from MetLife Stadium and the Meadowlands Racetrack, next to the American Dream shopping and entertainment complex.

The arena, which opened in 1981, was originally built to accommodate the New Jersey Nets basketball team. In 1982, the relocated Colorado Rockies hockey team became the New Jersey Devils and joined the Nets at the venue. In 1985, the Seton Hall Pirates men's collegiate basketball team began playing its home games at the arena. In 2007, the Prudential Center opened in nearby Newark as the new Devils home arena. Seton Hall, whose campus in South Orange is closer to Newark than East Rutherford, likewise moved its basketball games there. The Nets remained at the Meadowlands for three more seasons before moving to Newark, where they played two seasons before departing New Jersey for Barclays Center in Brooklyn. The men's basketball team from Fordham University played four home games during the 2010–11 season at the arena.

Following the departure of all three of its major tenants, the arena continued to host occasional non-sporting events, such as touring shows and concerts, and other local events. The state-owned facility reported losses for 2013, and was projected to have $8.5 million in losses for 2015. On January 15, 2015, the New Jersey Sports and Exposition Authority (NJSEA) voted to shut down Izod Center, and have Prudential Center acquire hosting rights to events scheduled for the arena over the next two years in a $2 million deal.

Since closing, the vacant arena has been used as a rehearsal venue for large-scale touring concert productions as well as a sound stage for video and television productions. Since 2018, NBC has leased the venue to film prime-time drama series, including The Enemy Within and Lincoln Rhyme: Hunt for the Bone Collector. It was also home to the crime drama series The Equalizer, starring Queen Latifah, and the TV programs Tales of the Walking Dead and The Walking Dead: Dead City.

== History ==
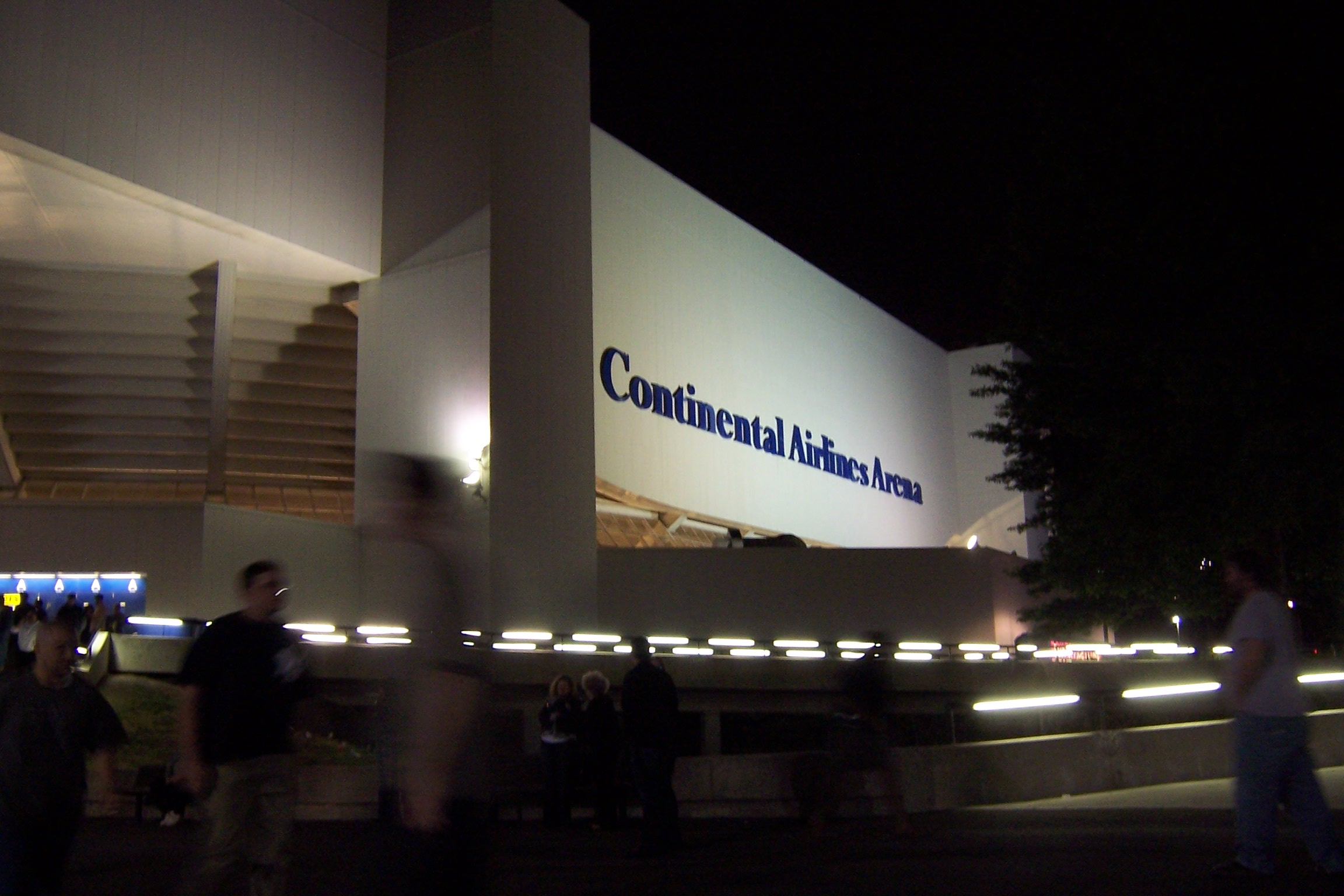
In 1996, Continental Airlines purchased naming rights to the Brendan Byrne Arena. This picture shows the arena's signage under that name.

Construction on a new arena across Route 20 (now 120) from Giants Stadium and the Meadowlands Racetrack began in 1977, with the arena's initial purpose being to serve as the primary home for the Nets who had moved from Nassau Coliseum in Uniondale, New York to New Jersey. While the venue was being built, the Nets played their home games in Piscataway at the Rutgers Athletic Center.

The arena was designed by Grad Partnership and Dilullo, Clauss, Ostroki & Partners and was constructed at a cost of $85 million. Originally named the Brendan Byrne Arena, after the sitting governor of New Jersey, Brendan Byrne, the building opened on July 2, 1981, with the first of six concerts by New Jersey rock musician Bruce Springsteen. The Nets moved into their new home on October 30, 1981, and lost to their cross-river rivals, the New York Knicks in their inaugural home game. In 1982, the arena hosted the NBA All-Star Game. Then, it hosted the 1996 NBA draft.

Another motivation for building an arena in the Meadowlands was to potentially lure a National Hockey League team to New Jersey. Governor Byrne was a member of an ownership group that was looking to do so, and in 1978 businessman Arthur Imperatore purchased the Colorado Rockies and announced that he would be relocating the team to New Jersey. Unfortunately for Imperatore, the Rockies would be sold twice more before that finally became a reality. The newly renamed, John McMullen-owned New Jersey Devils played their first game at the arena on October 5, 1982, against the Pittsburgh Penguins, with the game ending in a 3–3 tie. Don Lever scored the first goal in the arena, which was the Devils' very first goal. In 1984, the arena hosted the NHL All-Star Game. The following year, the Seton Hall Pirates men's basketball team began playing at the arena.

On January 4, 1996, the New Jersey Sports and Exposition Authority (NJSEA) announced a naming rights deal with Continental Airlines under which the airline, with a hub at nearby Newark Liberty International Airport, would pay the NJSEA $29 million over 12 years. As Continental Airlines Arena, it hosted the 1996 Final Four—the last Final Four to date that has been held in an arena specifically built for basketball.

In September 2006, the Nets and the NJSEA announced an extension of their lease to keep the team in the Meadowlands until 2013, with a provision to leave as early as 2009 if the Brooklyn arena was completed. It was reported at the time that the Nets' owner, Bruce Ratner was seeking to sell the Nets, thus thwarting any possible move to Brooklyn.

On May 5, 2007, the Devils played their last game at the arena, losing 3–2 to the Ottawa Senators, eliminating them from the Eastern Conference semifinals 4–1. Scott Gomez scored the final goal in the building. The Devils subsequently relocated to the newly constructed Prudential Center in nearby Newark at the beginning of the 2007–08 NHL season.

Following the Devils' final season at the arena in 2007, Continental Airlines opted out of the naming rights agreement and the NJSEA signed an agreement with Izod for five years. The company paid $1.4 million per year for the first two years of the agreement; when the Nets left, it dropped to $750,000 per year for the balance of the five-year deal. The columns of the Izod Center's exterior were also repainted red as the arena assumed a new color scheme.

In 2009, Newark mayor Cory Booker and Devils owner Jeffrey Vanderbeek called for the closing of the Izod Center, because it was a competing venue to the Prudential Center for events, and a "drain on taxpayers." In October 2009, a deal was brokered for the Nets to play at the Prudential Center for two seasons, beginning in the 2010–11 NBA season. The deal also included a partnership with the Prudential Center hosting sporting events (Devils, Nets, Seton Hall), and the Izod Center handling concerts and family shows. The two arenas proposed a joint venture, Jersey Presents LLC, to wrestle leverage from promoters who had been playing the two against each other. "You can’t have two venues that close together fighting each other and have that be productive for the state," said Jerry Zaro, economic czar to former New Jersey Governor Jon Corzine, who brokered the deal. The Nets' agreement to play the 2010–11 and 2011–12 seasons in Newark was finalized on February 18, 2010. On April 12, 2010, the Nets played their final game at the Izod Center, a 105–95 loss to the Charlotte Bobcats. Terrence Williams made the final basket in the arena.

=== Shutdown ===
With the loss of its major tenants, the Izod Center served primarily as a venue for traveling events, such as concerts, ice shows, and other occasional local events such as graduation ceremonies. New Jersey's government considered possible options for the arena, including selling or leasing it to another operator, or closing it entirely. Triple Five Group had attempted to negotiate taking over the arena so it could be incorporated into the nearby American Dream Meadowlands complex, but the deal fell through. The arena reported losses for 2013, also facing competition from Barclays Center in landing major concerts, and it was estimated that the arena would lose $8.5 million over the course of 2015. Even with its use during Super Bowl XLVIII, Izod Center reported a $45,800 loss from the event.

On January 15, 2015, as urged by state governor Chris Christie, the NJSEA voted to close Izod Center. Under a two-year, $2 million agreement with Devils Arena Entertainment LLC, most future events scheduled for Izod Center were moved to Prudential Center. While the arena was originally expected to be shut down by the end of January, its final event was a Ringling Bros. and Barnum & Bailey circus event on March 22, 2015. Under the terms of the agreement, the operators of Prudential Center were held responsible for staffing and logistics for shows held after January 31 but was entitled to receive the profits from such events.

On July 14, 2016, The Record reported that Devils Arena Entertainment had yet to pay the first $500,000 installment of its $2 million agreement with the NJSEA. On August 11, 2016, the NJSEA announced that it would allow musicians to book the arena for use as a rehearsal facility. Prudential Center president Hugh Weber noted that Coldplay had similarly done so prior to their tour stop at nearby MetLife Stadium, and that while Prudential Center has frequently seen similar bookings, there is a large backlog due to the venue's high traffic. The NJSEA and the Prudential Center will share the revenue generated by the rehearsals.

Since May 1, 2025, the arena is the site of the annual NJ Film Expo due to the increase of film and television production in the state of New Jersey.

=== Seating capacity ===
Basketball
| Years | Capacity |
|---|---|
| 1981–1987 | 20,149 |
| 1987–1988 | 20,040 |
| 1988–2003 | 20,050 |
| 2003–2004 | 19,970 |
| 2004–2005 | 20,175 |
| 2005–2006 | 20,100 |
| 2006–2007 | 20,035 |
| 2007–2009 | 19,990 |
| 2009–2015 | 18,974 |

Ice hockey
| Years | Capacity |
|---|---|
| 1981–1985 | 19,025 |
| 1985–2007 | 19,040 |

== Usage ==
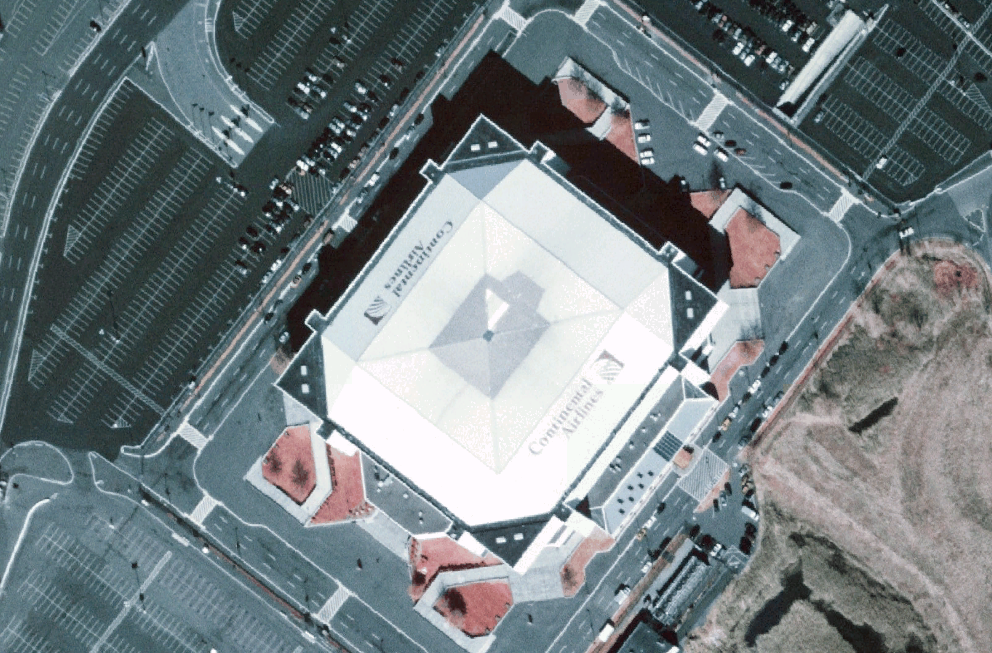
An aerial view of the Meadowlands Arena (under its Continental Airlines Arena signature)

=== Sports ===
The arena has primarily served as a sports venue in its history. The arena was the home of the NBA's New Jersey Nets basketball franchise from 1981 to 2010. It was the home arena for the NHL's New Jersey Devils hockey franchise from 1982 to 2007 and the NCAA's Seton Hall Pirates men's basketball team from 1985 to 2007 as well as continuing to play host to various regular season men's college basketball. The last game being played on December 18, 2014, between the Duke Blue Devils and UConn Huskies. Izod Center used two separate floors for NBA and NCAA basketball—a standard hardwood floor for Nets and the arena's old parquet floor for regular season college basketball (since 2007, the NCAA has used a uniform floor for regional sites).

College basketball first arrived at the arena with the opening rounds of the 1984 NCAA basketball tournament. Seton Hall moved its Big East Conference men's basketball games to the arena for the 1985–86 season. The arena hosted the NCAA Men's Final Four in 1996, the last traditional arena to do so to date. On eleven occasions (1986–1991, 1993, 1995, 1999, 2004, 2007) the arena hosted the semifinals and finals of the tournament's East Regional. Only Kansas City's Municipal Auditorium, which hosted 13 regional finals from 1940 to 1952, has hosted more. It also hosted the 1982–1989 Metro Atlantic Athletic Conference and 1986 Atlantic Ten Conference men's basketball tournaments.

On January 22, 1987, after New Jersey was hit with 20 inches (51 cm) of snow, only 334 fans attended the Devils' 7–5 victory over the Calgary Flames, a record for the lowest attendance for a game in modern NHL history.

Other teams that have called the arena home include the New Jersey Rockets of the Major Indoor Soccer League, the New Jersey Rockin' Rollers of Roller Hockey International, the New Jersey XTreme of the National Indoor Football League, and the New Jersey Red Dogs / Gladiators of the Arena Football League. Two different National Lacrosse League teams have played at the arena—the New Jersey Saints from 1987 to 1988, and the New Jersey Storm from 2002 to 2003. The New York Cosmos also used the arena to host indoor matches, and the last NASL indoor game was played at the arena on April 11, 1984 – the Cosmos lost to the San Diego Sockers, 7–3, in front of 4,717 fans, giving the Sockers a sweep of the best-of-five series.

On February 12, 2011, the arena hosted Strikeforce: Fedor vs. Silva. In November 2011, the Izod Center was the host of the final round of the TicketCity Legends Classic. The UFC on Fox 3 event took place at the arena on May 5, 2012.

==== Championships ====
Meadowlands Arena played host to the 1995, 2000, 2001, and 2003 Stanley Cup Final. The arena saw the Devils clinch two of their three Stanley Cup championships before a home crowd, winning Game 4 of the 1995 Finals over the Detroit Red Wings and Game 7 of the 2003 Finals over the Mighty Ducks of Anaheim; the Devils' other Stanley Cup win took place in Game 6 of the 2000 Finals over the Dallas Stars at Dallas' Reunion Arena. The Devils lost in the 2001 Finals in seven games to the Colorado Avalanche. The arena also was host to the Los Angeles Lakers winning an NBA Championship by sweeping the Nets on June 12, 2002, and again the next year, when the Nets lost in six games to the San Antonio Spurs. Izod Center is the most recent of five venues to host the Stanley Cup Final and NBA Finals at the same time; the other four are Boston Garden, Madison Square Garden in New York, The Spectrum in Philadelphia and Chicago Stadium. Game 3 of the 1983-84 NASL Indoor Finals was played there on April 11, 1984, between the Cosmos and the San Diego Sockers. This also happened to be the last indoor game played in the North American Soccer League, as the league folded in early 1985. It was one of the busiest arenas in North America in the 1980s, 1990s and 2000s, playing host to numerous championship and neutral games.

The arena also hosted the NCAA Men's Final Four (basketball) in 1996, which was won by the University of Kentucky, and included Syracuse University, the University of Massachusetts, and Mississippi State University.

=== Concerts ===
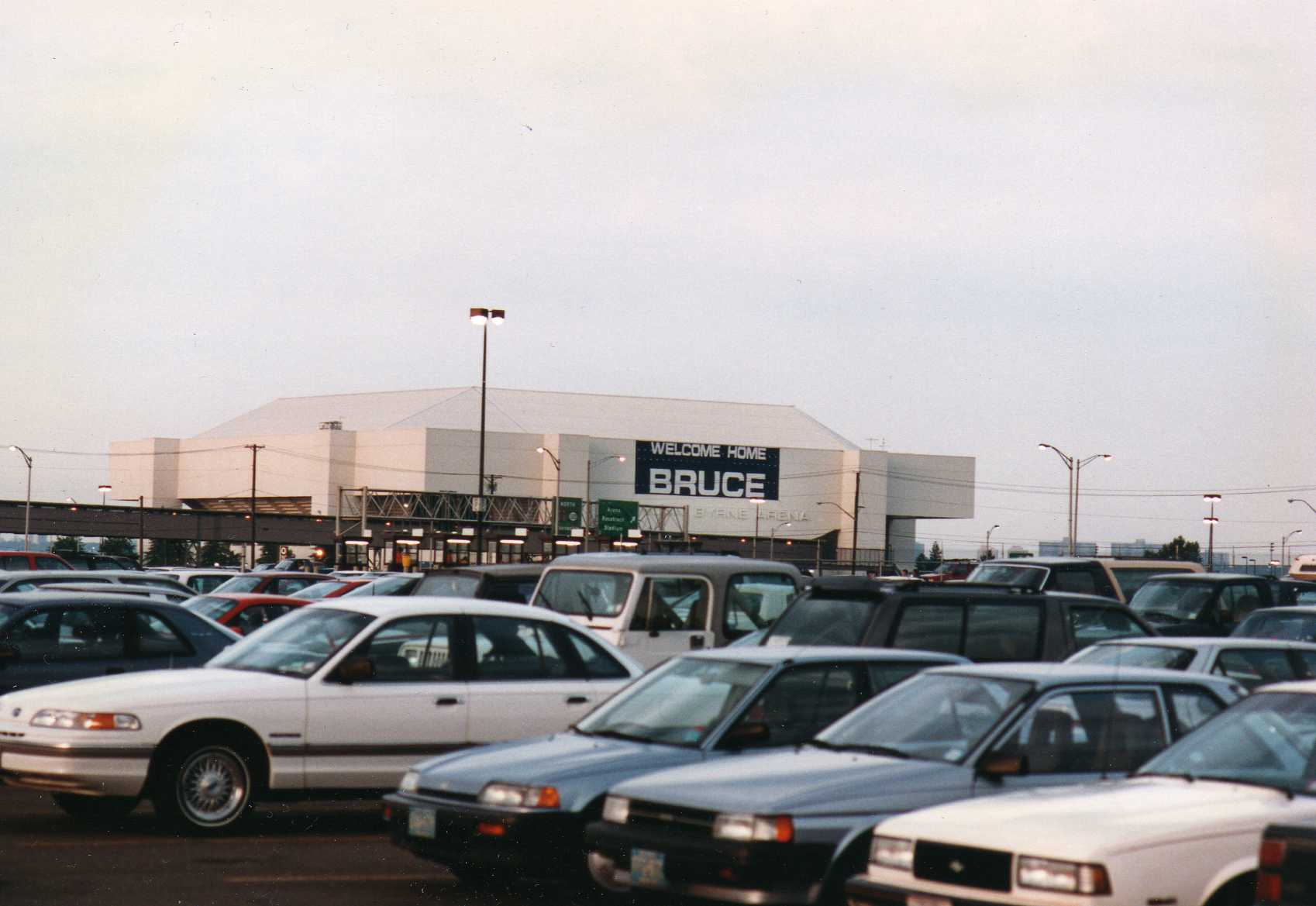
Brendan Byrne Arena officials placed a large "Welcome Home Bruce" sign on their structure, during the 1992 shows of the Bruce Springsteen and the "Other Band" Tour.

The arena was a popular site for concerts, having been designed with acoustics in mind and requiring a smaller facility fee for artists than competing venues, such as Madison Square Garden.

Bruce Springsteen remains one of the most popular concert acts; his appearances have included a six-night run to open the arena in July 1981, a 10-night sold-out run in 1984, an 11-night run in 1992 and a 15-night sold-out run in 1999. This last feat was commemorated by a large banner hanging from the rafters, next to the banners representing the achievements of the resident sports teams. Springsteen would return to the arena for concerts in 2002, 2004, 2005, 2007, 2009, and 2012. Additionally, a number of tracks from Springsteen's 1986 live album Live/1975-85 were recorded at the arena during concerts in 1981 and 1984. In 2015, Springsteen's August 5, 1984, concert was officially released as a live album followed by his August 20, 1984 concert in 2018, his July 25, 1992 concert in 2019, and his July 9, 1981 concert in 2020. New Jersey natives Bon Jovi have played at the arena many times and sold out every show. The only other act to do that is Bruce Springsteen.

The Rolling Stones performed three consecutive shows, during their 1981 North American Tour, on November 5–7, 1981, with Tina Turner, George Thorogood & The Destroyers and The J. Geils Band as their opening acts. The shows on November 5 and 6 were filmed and partially featured on their live-concert film, entitled Let's Spend the Night Together. Queen performed in the arena on August 9, 1982, during their Hot Space Tour. This concert is infamous for Brian May 'accidentally' snapping a replica of his Red Special after he hurled it to his wall of Vox AC30s and the roadies missed catching it. The replica was made by John Birch and was notably seen in the music videos of We Will Rock You and Spread Your Wings. Iron Maiden performed the first show on their The Beast on the Road Tour on October 22, 1982, and on their Somewhere Back in Time World Tour on March 14, 2008. Their performance of "Rime of the Ancient Mariner" was featured in the concert documentary Flight 666.

The Grateful Dead played 16 times from 1983 through 1989, and recorded Road Trips Volume 4 Number 2, on March 31–April 1, 1988 and Nightfall of Diamonds, on October 16, 1989.

Rush performed during their Power Windows Tour on March 31 and April 1, 1986. The shows were partially featured on their concert album, entitled A Show of Hands.

Pink Floyd performed three concerts on October 10, 11 and 12, 1987, as part of their A Momentary Lapse of Reason Tour. Michael Jackson performed three sold-out shows during his Bad World Tour on October 3, 4 and 5, 1988, in front of 61,061 people. George Dalaras performed a sold-out concert at Meadowlands Arena on April 9, 1994. It is the biggest Greek concert ever held outside of Greece. It was a personal initiative of George Dalaras in order to support Cyprus and to promote the Cyprus problem. Among others, Al Di Meola had taken part in the concert. The Dave Matthews Band's performance on September 11, 1999, was recorded for a PBS special and subsequently released as a live album and DVD, entitled Listener Supported.

Kiss performed on June 27, 2000, during their Kiss Farewell Tour, which was filmed and is available on their Kissology Volume Three: 1992–2000 box set. Cher performed two shows during her, then, Farewell Tour on July 2, 2002, and April 13, 2005. On her DVD Cher: Live at the MGM Grand in Las Vegas, there is a video of her rehearsing at the Izod Center. Phish performed a concert on February 24, 2003, which featured legendary blues guitarist B.B. King for most of the first set. Simon & Garfunkel performed two consecutive shows during their Old Friends Reunion Tour, on December 7–8, 2003, with The Everly Brothers as their opening act. They performed "Leaves That Are Green" in place of "Song for the Asking", which had been on their setlist for other concerts on this tour, following an announcement that they had not played it live since 1967.

The arena played host to the final show of the politically motivated Vote for Change Tour on October 13, 2004, featuring performances by Patti Scialfa, Jackson Browne and Bruce Springsteen & E Street Band, with special guest John Fogerty and unannounced guest Eddie Vedder. Slipknot performed at the arena on March 6, 2005 and included recordings from the performance on their first live album, 9.0: Live. The preshow of the concert was featured in a segment on the March 9, 2005, episode of Late Night With Conan O'Brien, where the Slipnutz, a comedy musical trio who were featured on Conan, opened for the band. However, the Slipnutz were heavily booed by the crowd.

The Red Hot Chili Peppers performed two consecutive shows during their Stadium Arcadium World Tour, on October 17 and 18, 2006, with The Mars Volta as their opening act. Footage from the shows and the arena were used in the music video for "Snow (Hey Oh)". The Spice Girls performed during The Return of the Spice Girls Tour on February 13, 2008. Prince & The New Power Generation kicked off their Welcome 2 American Tour, with two consecutive shows on December 15 and 17, 2010. They also performed two impromptu semi-private shows in the "Hospitality Room", where 50 fans attended the show on December 16 and 30 attended the show on December 18. The "Love for Levon" concert took place on October 3, 2012, as a tribute to late drummer/singer Levon Helm of The Band. The show featured a wide variety of musicians who had worked with Helm, as well as musicians who were influenced by him. Proceeds from the show went towards keeping Helm's Woodstock barn in his family's control, as well as continuing his Midnight Ramble concert series in the barn. The show's musical directors were Don Was and Levon Helm collaborator Larry Campbell. The concert was released on CD/DVD on March 19, 2013.

=== Other events ===
Fordham University's men's basketball team used the Izod Center as an alternate home court for four games in the 2010–11 season. The average attendance for these games was only 1,799, which was approximately half of the capacity of Fordham's normal home, Rose Hill Gymnasium.

American Idol held auditions at the Izod Center on September 22, 2011. It also held auditions prior to this in 2006 for its sixth season.

=== Wrestling Events ===
The arena has hosted various wrestling events such as WWE Raw, Smackdown! and the following pay per view events:

- SummerSlam 1989, 1997 & 2007
- King Of The Ring 2001
- No Mercy 2004
- No Way Out 2012
- Extreme Rules 2014

== Other facilities ==
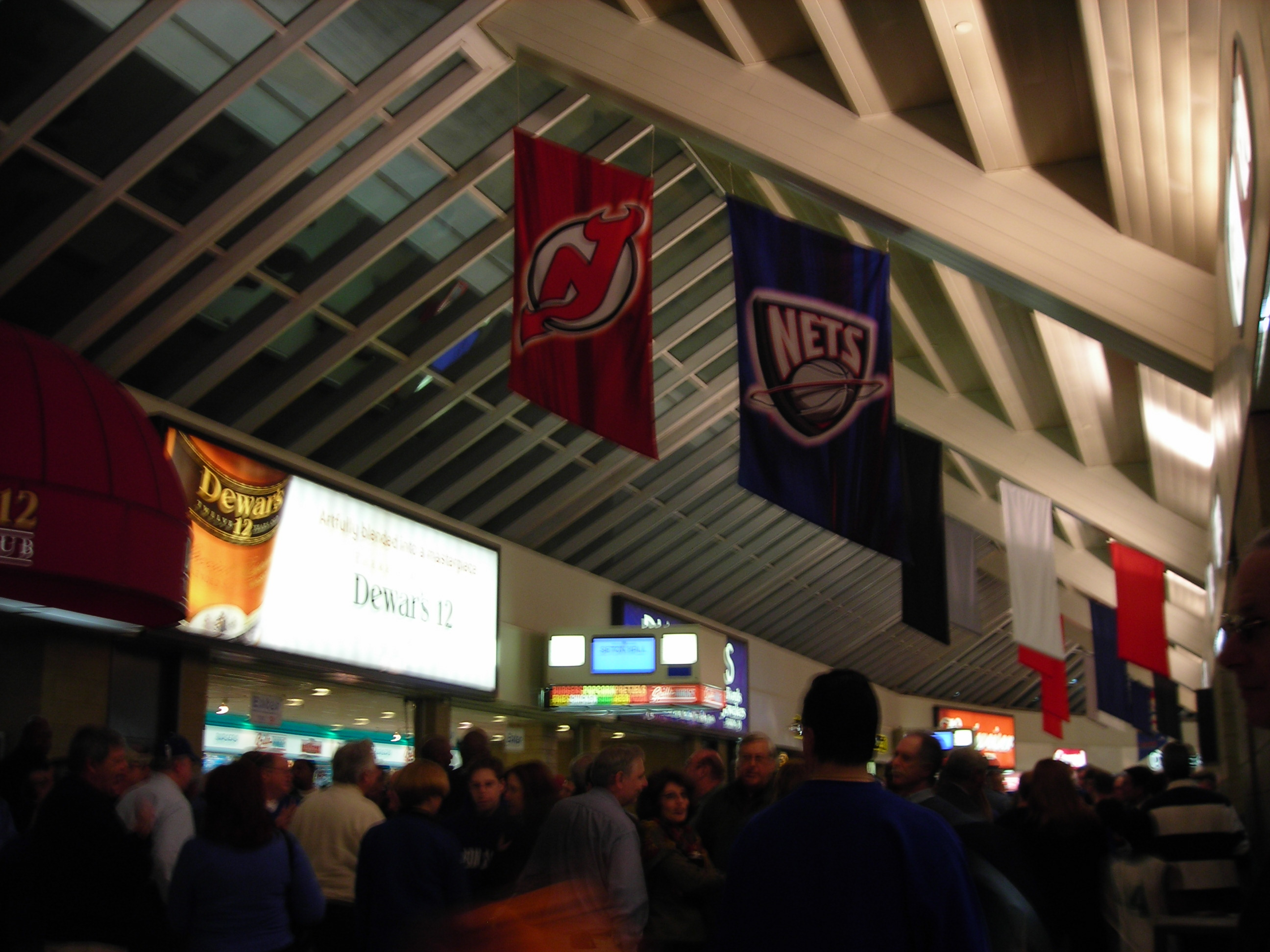
The arena's concourse in 2007, while it was known as Continental Airlines Arena

The center previously hosted a Continental Airlines ticketing office.

The Winner's Club was a luxury bar and restaurant inside the arena that hosted parties and group events. The Winner's Club is now used by the New Jersey State Police.

=== Sports Hall of Fame of New Jersey ===
The Sports Hall of Fame of New Jersey was established in 1988 to honor athletes, teams, events, and contributors associated with the state of New Jersey. While there was no physical site or structure for the hall, the members were honored with plaques displayed throughout the arena.

== In popular culture ==
In 1985, Meadowlands Arena was featured in a first season episode of The Cosby Show titled "Back to the Track, Jack", in which series protagonist Dr. Heathcliff Huxtable and his fellow former track teammates from Hillman College compete in a masters relay race rematch against their former rivals from Norton University. The following year, the arena was featured in the opening scene of the film Highlander, purporting to be Madison Square Garden.

Some scenes of the 2010 romantic comedy-drama film Just Wright were filmed at the arena.

== Replacement ==
In 2021, plans were revealed to replace the Meadowlands Arena with a new convention center.

== Public perception ==
The arena was frequently cited near the bottom of public polls. It was commonly referred to as "cold and dull" in appearance, as well as being "cavernous". In a 2005 poll, USA Today rated it the worst arena in the NBA, with the distance of the inexpensive seats from the court, and the level of crowding in the concourse after the game cited as reasons. Construction workers are proposing to demolish the arena, but is still standing in its place as of June 26, 2026.

Events and tenants
| Preceded by Rutgers Athletic Center | Home of the New Jersey Nets; 1981–2010 | Succeeded by Prudential Center |
| Preceded by McNichols Sports Arena (as Colorado Rockies) | Home of the New Jersey Devils; 1982–2007 | Succeeded by Prudential Center |
| Preceded by Coliseum at Richfield | Host of the NBA All-Star Game; 1982 | Succeeded by The Forum |
| Preceded by Nassau Coliseum | Host of the NHL All-Star Game; 1984 | Succeeded by Olympic Saddledome |
| Preceded by Kingdome | NCAA Division I men's basketball tournament Final Four; 1996 | Succeeded by RCA Dome |
| Preceded by first arena | Home of the New Jersey Red Dogs/Gladiators; 1997–2002 | Succeeded by Thomas & Mack Center |
| Preceded by Trump Taj Mahal | Ultimate Fighting Championship venue UFC 32 | Succeeded by Mandalay Bay Events Center |
