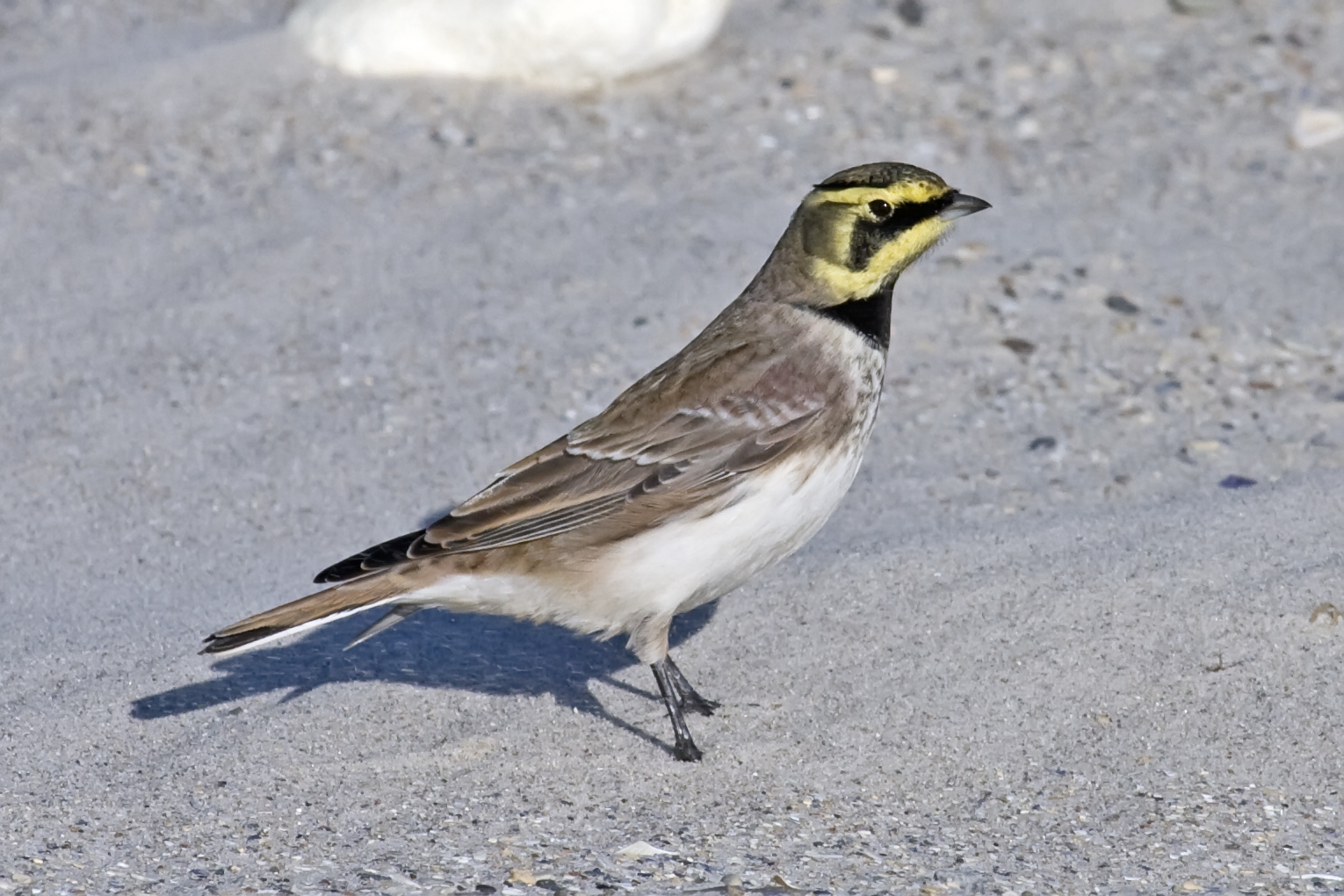
- Horned lark (Eremophila alpestris)

Scientific classification
- Kingdom: Animalia
- Phylum: Chordata
- Class: Aves
- Order: Passeriformes
- Family: Alaudidae
- Genus: Eremophila; F. Boie, 1828

Type species
- Alauda alpestris Linnaeus, 1758

Species
- see text

Synonyms
- Otocorys; Phileremos; Pliocalcarius

= Eremophila (bird) =

Genus of birds

The bird genus Eremophila comprises the two horned larks.

== Taxonomy and systematics ==
The current genus name is from Ancient Greek eremos, "desert", and phileo, "to love".

=== Extant species ===
Genus Eremophila – F. Boie, 1828 – two species
Common name	Scientific name and subspecies	Range	Size and ecology	IUCN status and estimated population
Horned lark	Eremophila alpestris (Linnaeus, 1758)	Europe, Asia, North America	Size: Habitat: Diet:	LC
Temminck's lark	Eremophila bilopha (Temminck, 1823)	Algeria, Egypt, Iraq, Israel, Jordan, Kuwait, Libya, Mauritania, Morocco, Saudi Arabia, Syria, Tunisia and Western Sahara	Size: Habitat: Diet:	LC

=== Extinct species ===
There is at least one fossil species included in this genus:

- †Eremophila orkhonensis (late Pliocene of Central Asia, synonym = Pliocalcarius orkhonensis)
- †Eremophila prealpestris (late Pliocene of Varshets, Bulgaria)

== Description ==
Unlike most other larks, these are distinctive looking species with striking head and face patterns, black and white in Temminck's lark and black and yellow in most horned larks. In the summer males of both species have black "horns", which give these larks their alternative names.

== Distribution and habitat ==
These are larks of open country which nest on the ground. The migratory horned lark breeds across much of northern North America, Europe and Asia and in the mountains of Europe. Temminck's lark is mainly a resident breeding species across much of north Africa, through northern Arabia to western Iraq.
