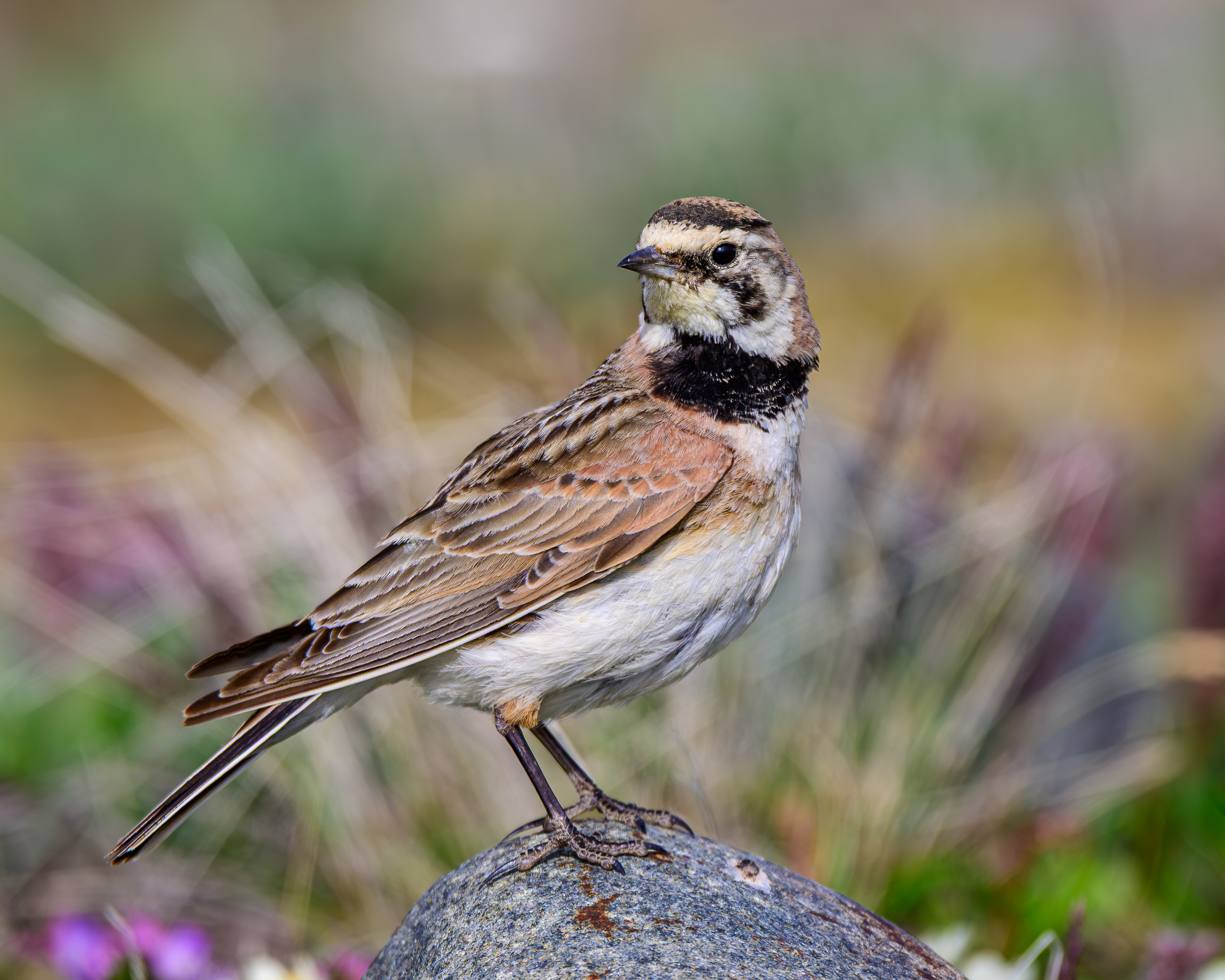
- E. a. hoyti
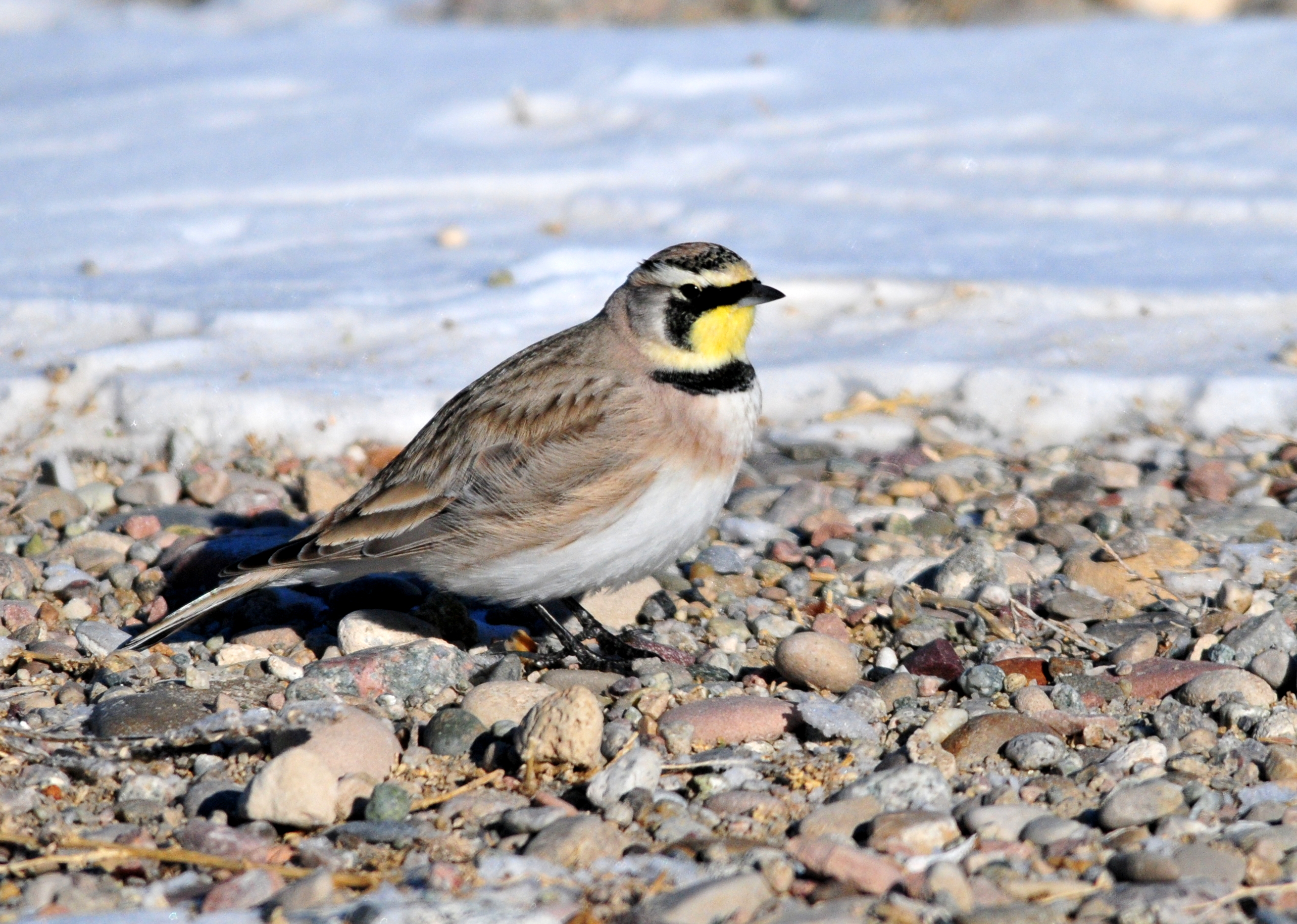

Conservation status
- Least Concern (IUCN 3.1)

Scientific classification
- Kingdom: Animalia
- Phylum: Chordata
- Class: Aves
- Order: Passeriformes
- Family: Alaudidae
- Genus: Eremophila
- Species: E. alpestris

Binomial name
- Eremophila alpestris (Linnaeus, 1758)

Subspecies
- See text
- Distribution map of horned lark Breeding Resident Passage Non-breeding

Synonyms
- Alauda alpestris Linnaeus, 1758; Chionophila alpestris (Linnaeus, 1758); Otocorys alpestris (Linnaeus, 1758)

= Horned lark =

Horned lark Temporal range: Calabrian–Present

Species of bird

The horned lark or shore lark (Eremophila alpestris) is a species of lark in the family Alaudidae found across the northern hemisphere. It is known as "horned lark" in North America for distinctive feathers on the heads of the male birds in summer, and as "shore lark" in Europe because it can be found on shorelines in the winter.

== Taxonomy ==
The horned lark was formally described in 1758 by the Swedish naturalist Carl Linnaeus in the tenth edition of his Systema Naturae under the binomial name Alauda alpestris. Linnaeus based his account on the description and illustration by the English naturalist Mark Catesby in his book The Natural History of Carolina, Florida and the Bahama Islands that was published between 1729 and 1732. Linnaeus specified the type locality as North America but this has been restricted to the coastal areas of South Carolina. The horned lark is now placed together with Temminck's lark in the genus Eremophila that was introduced in 1828 by the German naturalist Friedrich Boie. The specific epithet alpestris is Latin meaning "of the high mountains", from Alpes, the Alps. A molecular genetic study of the Alaudidae published in 2023 found that Temminck's lark (Eremophila bilopha) was embedded in a clade containing taxa currently classed as subspecies of the horned lark.

The horned lark is suggested to have diverged from Temminck's lark (E. bilopha) around the Early-Middle Pleistocene, according to genomic divergence estimates. The horned lark is known from around a dozen localities of Late Pleistocene age, including those in Italy, Russia, The United Kingdom and the United States. The earliest known fossil is from the Calabrian of Spain, around 1–0.8 million years old.

In 2020, a well-preserved, complete frozen bird carcass of a female horned lark was discovered in Siberian permafrost from the Russian Far East. It died around 44,000 to 49,000 ±1,100 thousand years before present. It was a transitional species between E. a. flava and E. a. brandti with it being closer to E. a. flava.

A 2014 genetic analysis suggested that the species consists of six clades that in the future may warrant recognition as separate species. A 2020 study also suggested splitting of the species, but into 4 species instead, the Himalayan horned lark E. longirostris, mountain horned lark E. penicillata, common horned lark E. alpestris (sensu stricto), alongside Temminck's lark.

=== Subspecies ===
Forty-two subspecies are currently recognized. Many subspecies are given the common name “shore lark”.

Image	Common name	Scientific name	Distribution	Description
	Pallid horned lark	Eremophila alpestris arcticola	Northern Alaska to British Columbia (western Canada).	
	Hoyt's horned lark	Eremophila alpestris hoyti	Northern Canada	
	Northern American horned lark	Eremophila alpestris alpestris	Eastern Canada	
	Dusky horned lark	Eremophila alpestris merrilli	Western coast of Canada and USA	
	St. Helens horned lark	Eremophila alpestris alpina	On the mountains of western Washington (northwestern USA)	
	Oregon horned lark	Eremophila alpestris lamprochroma	Inland mountains of western USA	
	Desert horned lark; also Pallid horned lark	Eremophila alpestris leucolaema	Southern Alberta (southwestern Canada) through north-central and central USA	
	Saskatchewan horned lark	Eremophila alpestris enthymia	From south-central Canada to Oklahoma and Texas (central USA)	
	Prairie horned lark	Eremophila alpestris praticola	southeastern Canada, northeastern and east-central USA	
	Sierra horned lark; also Sierra Nevada horned lark	Eremophila alpestris sierrae	Mountains of northeastern California	
	Ruddy horned lark	Eremophila alpestris rubea	Central California	
	Utah horned lark	Eremophila alpestris utahensis	Mountains of west-central USA	
	Island horned lark	Eremophila alpestris insularis	Islands of the southern Californian coasts	
	California horned lark	Eremophila alpestris actia	Coastal mountains of Southern California and northern Baja California	
	Mohave horned lark	Eremophila alpestris ammophila	Deserts of southeastern California and southwestern Nevada	
	Sonora horned lark	Eremophila alpestris leucansiptila	Deserts of southern Nevada, western Arizona and northwestern Mexico	
	Montezuma horned lark	Eremophila alpestris occidentalis	Northern Arizona and a central New Mexico	
	Scorched horned lark	Eremophila alpestris adusta	Southern Arizona and southern New Mexico, possible north central Mexico	
	Magdalena horned lark	Eremophila alpestris enertera	Central Baja California	
	Texas horned lark	Eremophila alpestris giraudi	Costal south central USA and northeastern Mexico	
	Northwest Mexican horned lark	Eremophila alpestris aphrasta	Chihuahua and Durango (northwestern Mexico)	
	Coahuila horned lark	Eremophila alpestris lactea	Coahuila (north-central Mexico)	
	Northeast Mexican horned lark	Eremophila alpestris diaphora	Southern Coahuila to northeastern Puebla	
	Central Mexican horned lark	Eremophila alpestris chrysolaema	West-central to east-central Mexico	Originally described as part of genus Alauda
	Oaxacan horned lark	Eremophila alpestris oaxacae	Southern Mexico	
	Colombian horned lark	Eremophila alpestris peregrina	Colombia	
	Shore lark	Eremophila alpestris flava	Northern Europe and northern Asia	Originally described as part of genus Alauda
	Steppe horned lark; also Brandt’s horned lark	Eremophila alpestris brandti	Southeastern European Russia to western Mongolia and northern China	
	Moroccan horned lark; also known as ‘shore lark’	Eremophila alpestris atlas	Morocco	
	Balkan horned lark; also called ‘shore lark’	Eremophila alpestris balcanica	Southern Balkans and Greece	
	Southern horned lark	Eremophila alpestris penicillata	Eastern Turkey and the Caucasus to Iran	
		Eremophila alpestris kumerloevei	Eastern Turkey and the Caucasus to Iran	
	Lebanon horned lark	Eremophila alpestris bicornis	Lebanon to Israel/Syria border	
	Pamir horned lark	Eremophila alpestris albigula	northeastern Iran and Turkmenistan to northwestern Pakistan	
		Eremophila alpestris argalea	Extreme western China	
	Przewalski’s lark	Eremophila alpestris teleschowi	Western and west-central China	
		Eremophila alpestris nigrifrons	Northeastern Qinghai	
	Long-billed horned lark	Eremophila alpestris longirostris	Northeastern Pakistan and western Himalayas	
	Elwes' horned lark	Eremophila alpestris elwesi	Southern and eastern Tibetan Plateau	
	Kham horned lark	Eremophila alpestris khamensis	Southwestern and south central China	

== Description ==
Unlike most other larks, this is a distinctive-looking species on the ground, mainly brown-grey above and pale below, with a striking black and yellow face pattern. Except for the central feathers, the tail is mostly black, contrasting with the paler body; this contrast is especially noticeable when the bird is in flight. The summer male has black "horns", two tufts of feathers on its head which give this species its American name. North America has a number of races distinguished by the face pattern and back colour of males, especially in summer. The southern European mountain race E. a. penicillata is greyer above, and the yellow of the face pattern is replaced with white.

Measurements:

- Length: 6.3-7.9 in (16-20 cm)
- Weight: 1.0-1.7 oz (28-48 g)
- Wingspan: 11.8-13.4 in (30-34 cm)

Vocalizations are high-pitched, lisping or tinkling, and weak. The song, given in flight as is common among larks, consists of a few chips followed by a warbling, ascending trill.

== Distribution and habitat ==
The horned lark breeds across much of North America from the high Arctic south to the Isthmus of Tehuantepec, northernmost Europe and Asia and in the mountains of southeast Europe. There is also an isolated population on a plateau in Colombia. It is mainly resident in the south of its range, but northern populations of this passerine bird are migratory, moving further south in winter.

This is a bird of open ground. In Eurasia it breeds above the tree line in mountains and the far north. In most of Europe, it is most often seen on seashore flats in winter, leading to the European name. In the UK it is found as a winter stopover along the coasts and in eastern England. In North America, where there are no other larks to compete with, it is also found on farmland, on prairies, in deserts, on golf courses and airports.

== Breeding and nesting ==
Males defend territories from other males during breeding season and females will occasionally chase away intruding females. Courting involves the male singing to the female while flying above her in circles. He then will fold his wings in and dive towards the female, opening his wings just before reaching the ground. The nest site is selected in the early spring by only the female and is either a natural depression in the bare ground or she digs a cavity using her bill and feet. She will spend 2–4 days preparing the site before building her nest. She weaves fine grasses, cornstalks, small roots, and other plant material and lines it with down, fur, feathers, and occasionally lint. The nest is about 3-4 inches in diameter with the interior diameter about 2.5 in wide and 1.5 in deep. It has been noted that she often adds a "doorstep" of pebbles, corncobs, or dung on one side of the nest. It is speculated that this is used to cover the excavated dirt and hide her nest more.

Females will lay a clutch of 2-5 gray eggs with brown spots, each about 1 in long and 0.5 in wide. Incubation will take 10–12 days until hatching and then the nestling period will take 8–10 days. During the nestling period, the chick is fed and defended by both parents. A female in the south can lay 2-3 broods a year while in the north, 1 brood a year is more common.

The structure of horned lark nests can vary depending on the microclimate, prevailing weather and predation risk, revealing flexibility in nesting behaviour to adjust to changing environmental conditions to maintain nest survival and nestling size development.

== Status and conservation ==
Horned lark populations are declining according to the North American Breeding Bird Survey. In 2016, the Partners in Flight Landbird Conservation Plan detailed the horned lark as a "Common Bird in Steep Decline," but the horned lark as of 2016 is not on the State of North America's Birds' Watch List. This species' decline could be contributed to the loss of habitat due to agricultural pesticides, the disturbed sites the birds prefer reverting to forested lands through reforestation efforts, urbanization and human encroachment as well as collisions at wind farms and at airports. In 2013, the U.S. Fish and Wildlife Service listed the subspecies streaked horned lark as threatened under the Endangered Species Act.

== Gallery ==
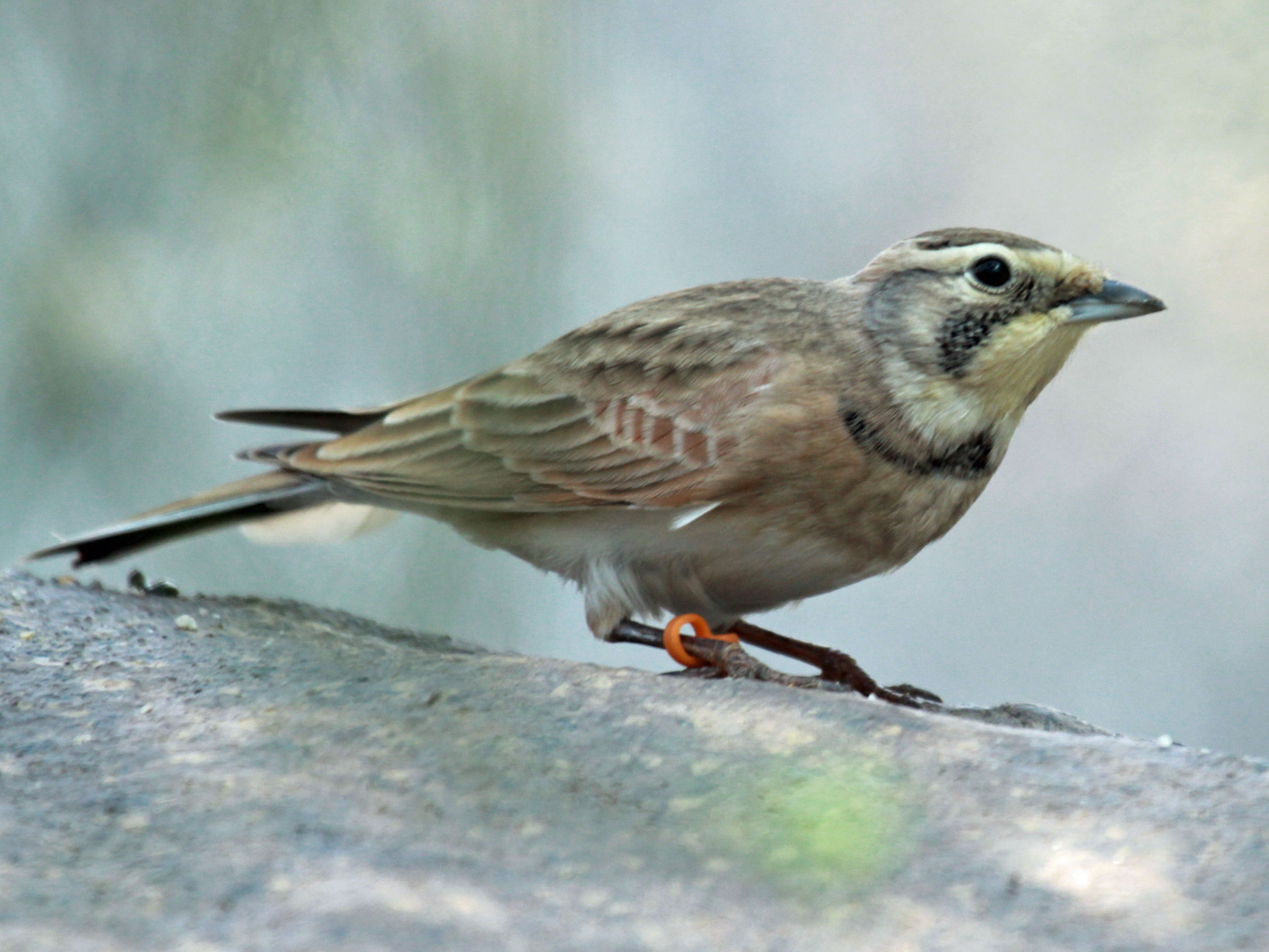
A male at the North Carolina Zoo in Asheboro, North Carolina, US

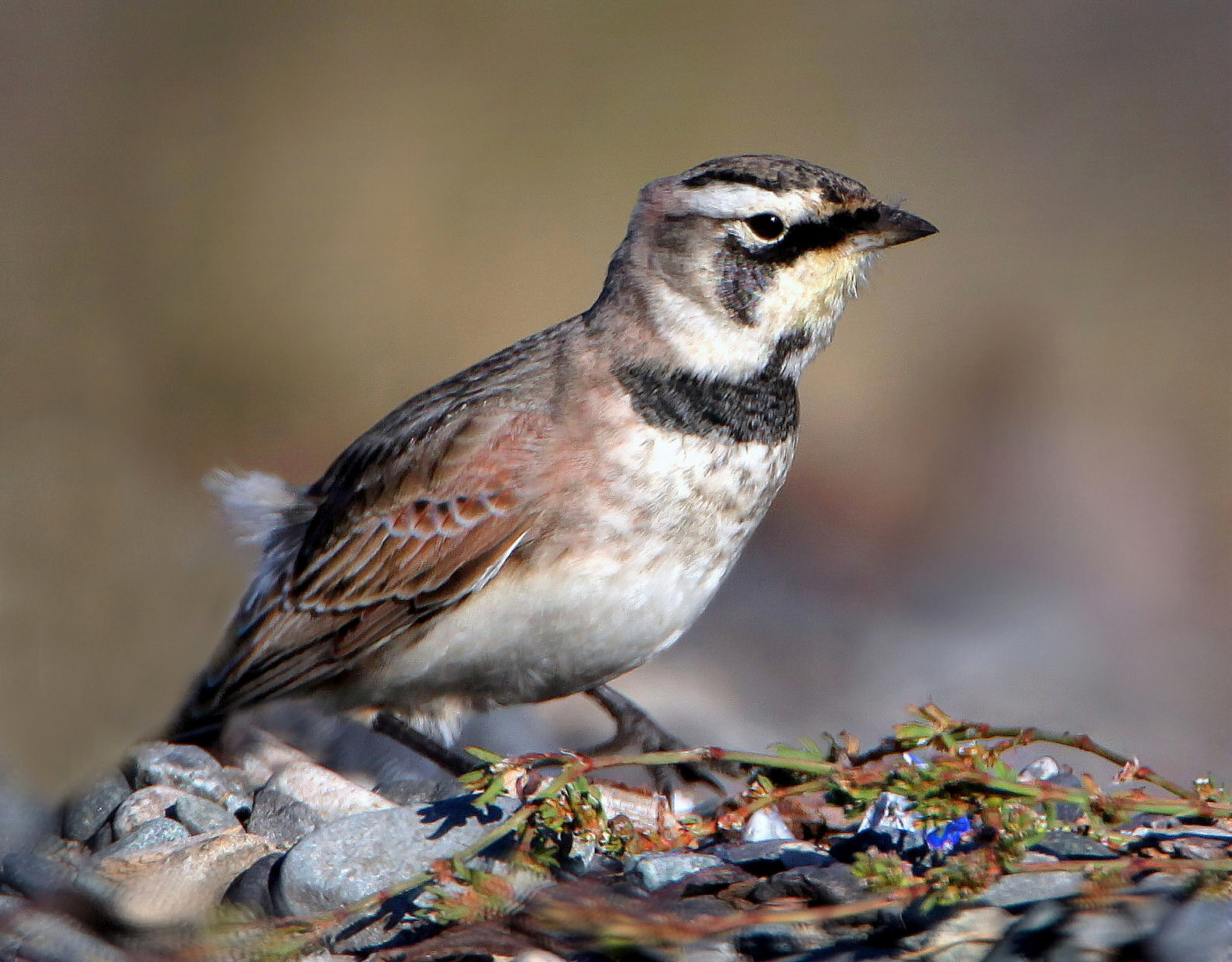
In British Columbia, Canada

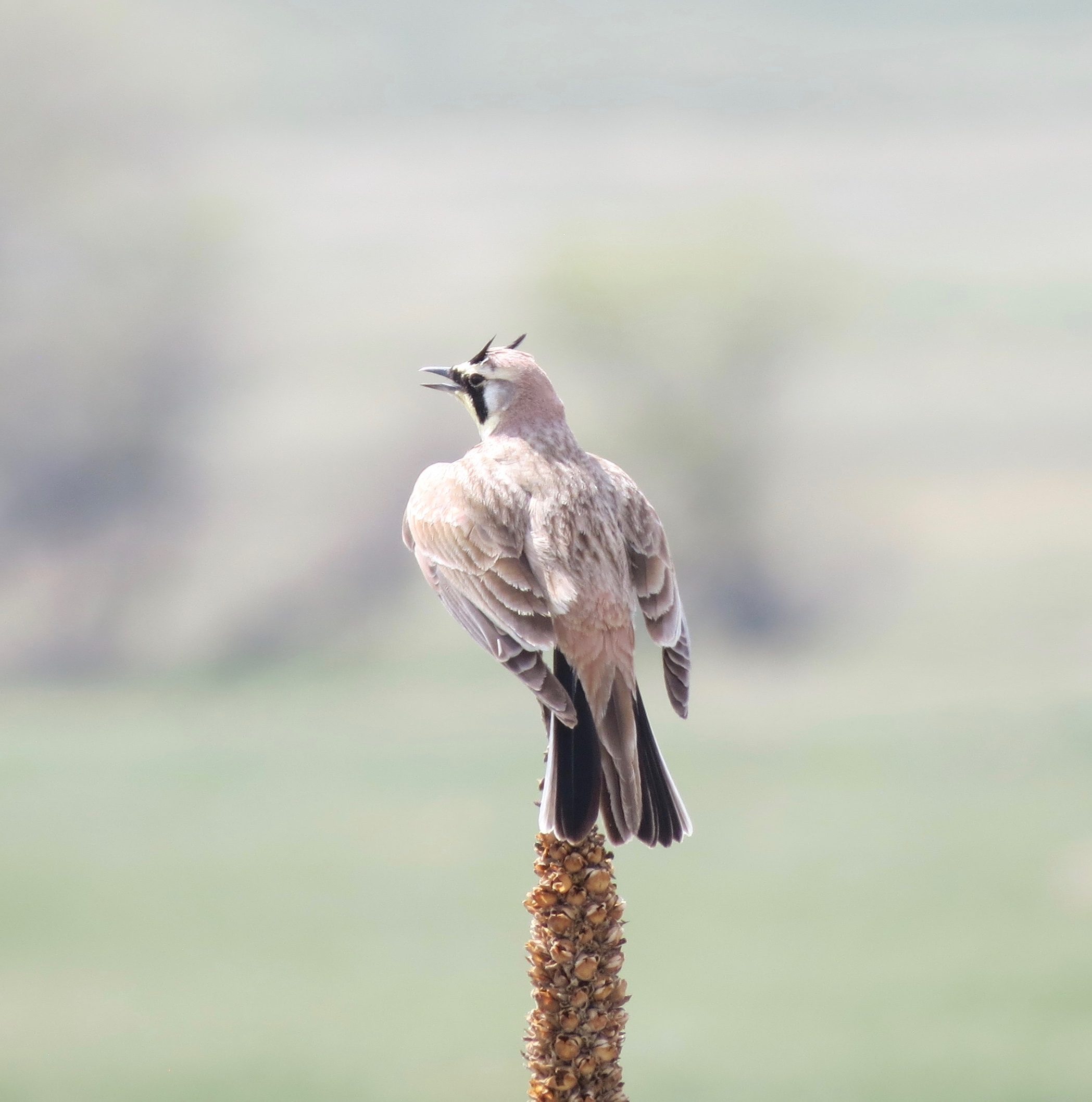
A lark displaying its horns at the Rocky Mountain Arsenal National Wildlife Refuge

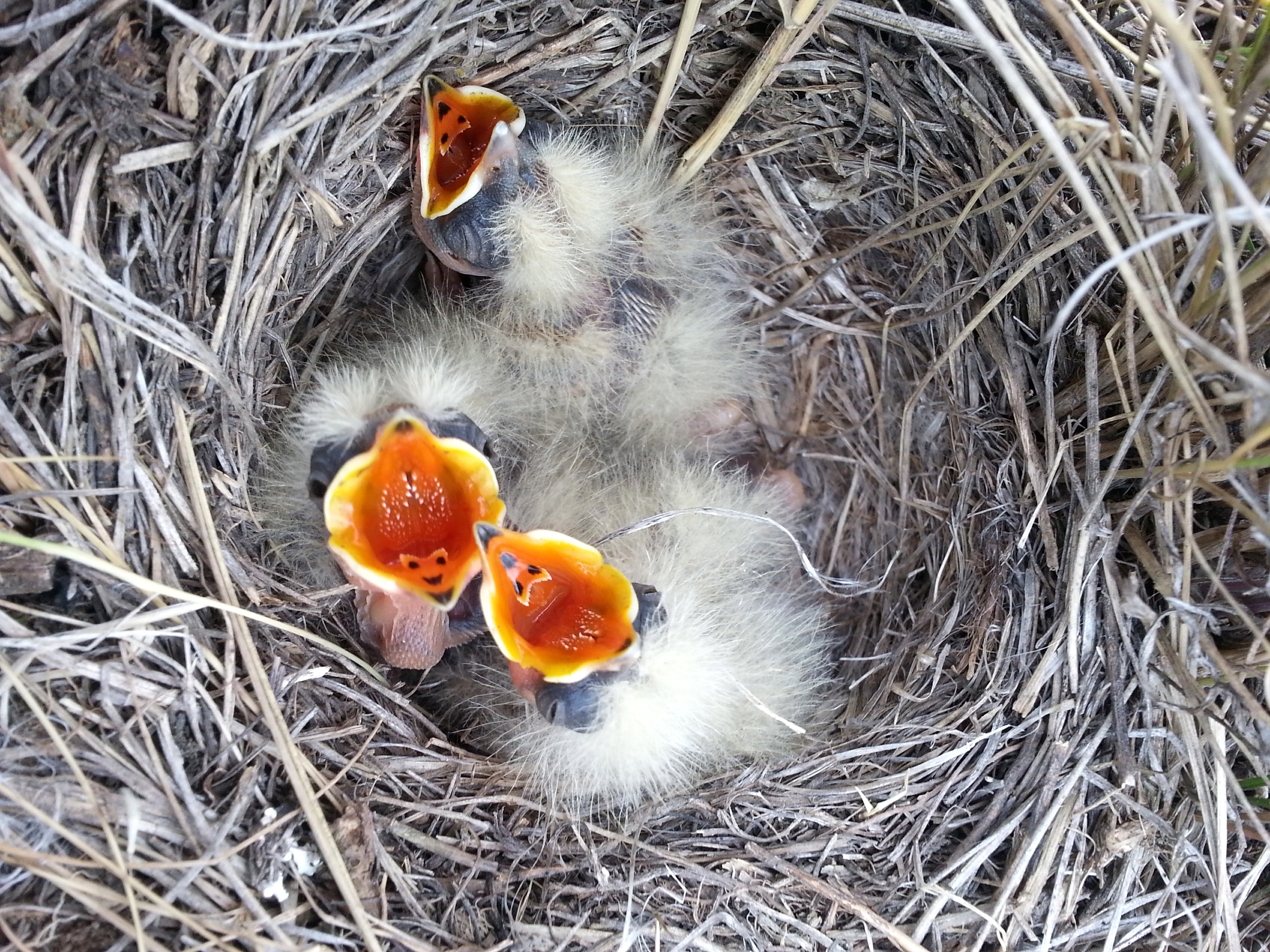
A nest with three chicks in the oil fields of Alberta, Canada

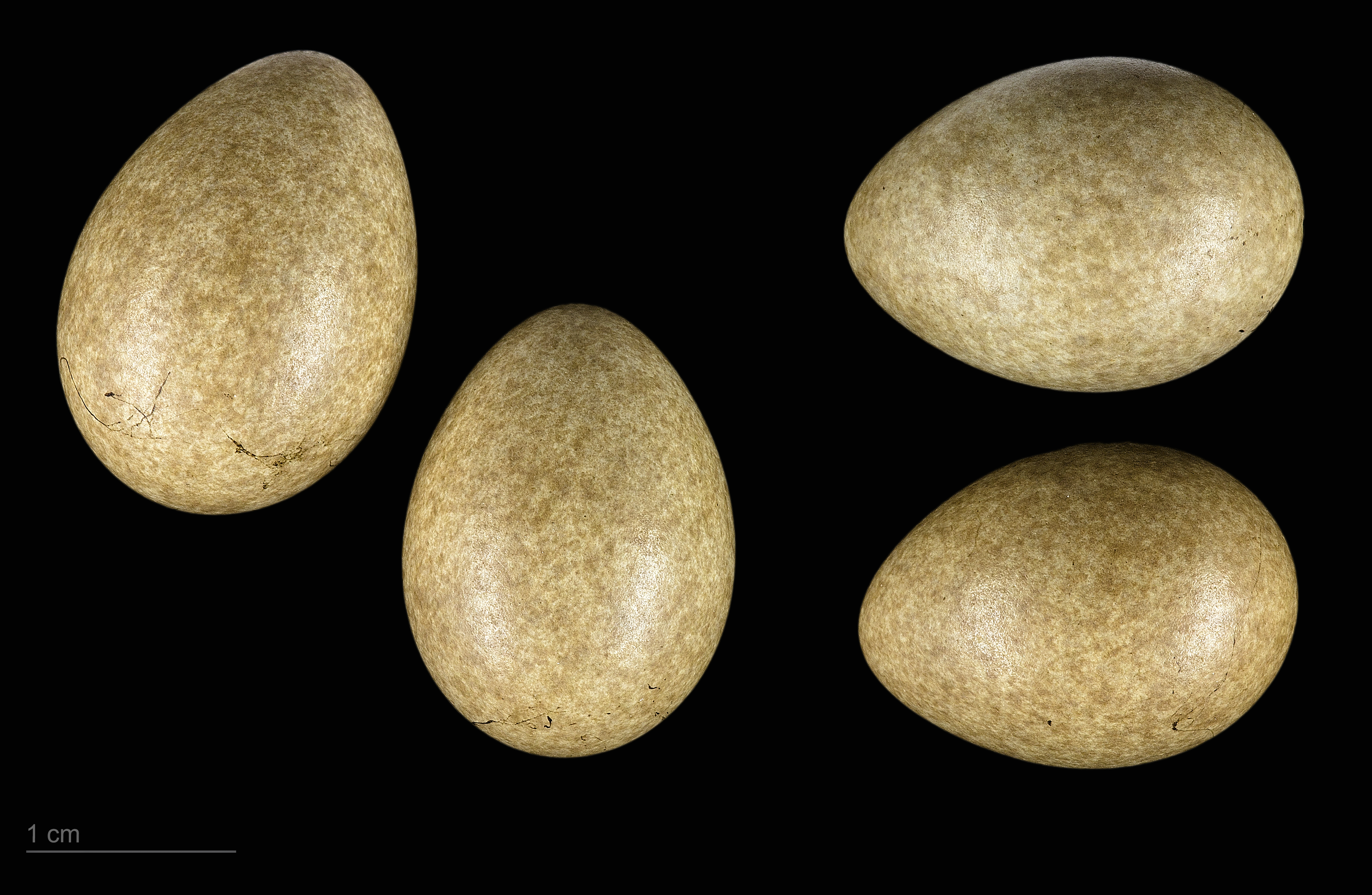
Eggs of Eremophila alpestris flava

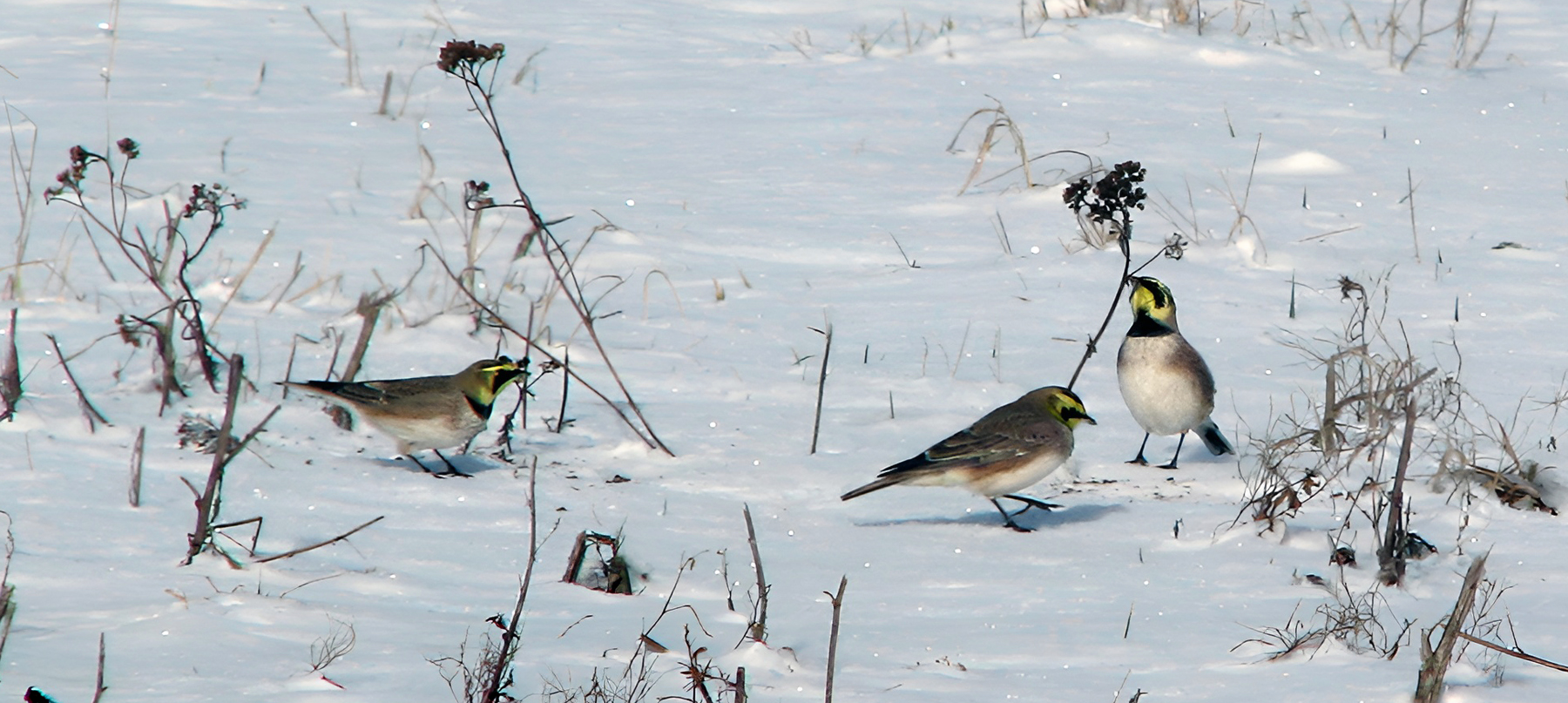
Horned lark in Ystad 2009.
