= Conrad Laforte =

Québécois ethnologist and librarian

Conrad Laforte (November 10, 1921 – September 4, 2008) was a Québécois ethnologist and librarian. He created the Catalogue de la chanson folklorique française which contains 80,000 entries.

== Early life and education ==
Laforte was born in Kénogami. He studied in Chicoutimi, the Université Laval, and finally the Université de Montréal.

== Career ==
Laforte studied and wrote about the origins of traditional French and French Canadian music, and worked with anthropologist Marius Barbeau to record many songs and stories that had been until then passed down orally in the culture. Laforte's best-known work is the six volume Catalogue de la chanson folklorique française.

Laforte taught folklore at the University of Laval. He also developed a set of criteria for classifying songs by genre. In 1982 he was elected to membership in the Royal Society of Canada. His honours include the Marius-Barbeau Medal and the Raymond-Casgrain Prize.

== Works ==
- La chanson folklorique et les écrivains du XIX^{e} siècle en France et au Québec, 1973.
- Le catalogue de la chanson folklorique francaise ; préf. de Luc Lacourcière, Presses de l'Université Laval, Québec, 1977.
- Menteries drôles et merveilleuses, 1978
- Survivances médiévales dans la chanson folklorique, 1981.
- Chansons strophiques, 1981.
- Chansons sur des timbres, 1983.
- Chansons folkloriques à sujet religieux, 1988.
- Poétique de la chanson traditionnelle française, 1993.
- Vision d'une societé par les chansons de tradition orale à caractère épique et tragique, 1997 (with Monique Jutras)
