= Little Bunny Foo Foo =

Children's poem and song

"Little Bunny Foo Foo" is a children's poem and song. The poem consists of four-line sung verses separated by some spoken words. The verses are sung to the tune of the French-Canadian children's song "Alouette" (1879), which is melodically similar to "Down by the Station" (1948) and the "Itsy Bitsy Spider". The person performing the song usually includes hand gestures, e.g. for "scooping" and "bopping".

The song has many different variations and is often passed on as childlore. Beverly Cleary's 1970 children's book Runaway Ralph mentions "Little Rabbit Fru-Fru" as a song heard at summer camp, and a 1970 issue of The New Yorker acknowledges "Little Bunny Phoo Phoo, a character in a children's story".

"Bunny Foo Foo", a 35-foot statue of a leaping rabbit that is named for the poem, is installed at a winery in St. Helena, California.

== Lyrics ==
Little Bunny Foo Foo,
Hopping through the forest,
Scooping up the field mice,
And bopping them on the head.

(Spoken)
Down came the Good Fairy, and she said,

"Little Bunny Foo Foo,
I don't want to see you,
Scooping up the field mice
And bopping them on the head."

(Spoken)
"I'll give you three chances,
And if you don't behave,
I'm gonna turn you into a goon!"

The next day... or That evening... or Later that night... or A few moments later...

The verses then repeat three more times, with the spoken verse altered to reflect Little Bunny Foo Foo's decreasing number of chances. The alteration appears in the first line of the verse, which changes to "I'll give you two more chances" and "I'll give you one more chance", in the second and third iterations, respectively.

In the fourth and final iteration, when the bunny has run out of chances, the entire spoken verse is altered as follows:

"I gave you three chances,
And you didn't behave,
And now I'm gonna turn you into a goon. POOF!"

One common ending has Little Bunny Foo Foo turned into a goon, with a pun ending "And the moral of the story is: Hare today, goon tomorrow." This form of story telling with a pun ending is also known as a feghoot.
