= Lincoln Mayorga =

American pianist, arranger and conductor (1937–2023)

- Also known as: Brooke Pemberton; Al "Spider" Dugan
- Born: March 28, 1937; Los Angeles, California, U.S.
- Died: July 3, 2023 (aged 86)
- Genres: Pop music Film score Classical music Ragtime
- Occupations: Pianist, arranger, composer
- Instrument: Piano
- Years active: 1957–2023

Lincoln Mayorga (March 28, 1937 – July 3, 2023) was an American pianist, arranger, conductor and composer who worked in rock and roll, pop, jazz and classical music.

== Life and career ==
=== Pop music in the 1950s and 1960s ===
Mayorga was born in Los Angeles, California, attended Hollywood High School, and trained as a classical pianist. He began working as arranger and accompanist to his high-school friends in the Four Preps, contributing one of the two piano parts on their 1958 hit "Big Man" and being known as "the fifth Prep". The group's producer, Lou Busch, helped Mayorga get a ragtime album issued in 1958, which was released under the pseudonym "Brooke Pemberton".

With Ed Cobb of the Four Preps, Mayorga also branched out into instrumental rock and roll, forming the Piltdown Men, a studio group whose "Brontosaurus Stomp" made the Billboard Hot 100 in 1960, and whose other records had greater success in the UK Singles Chart. At the same time, he and Cobb formed the Link Eddy Combo (the name taken from their names Lincoln and Ed), with musicians Al Garcia, Fred Mendoza, Vince Bumatay and Art Rodriguez. Their instrumental, "Big Mr. C", was the first single released on Frank Sinatra's Reprise label in 1961, and reached number 28 on the US Billboard R&B chart.

Mayorga and Cobb also arranged and produced the first recordings by singer Ketty Lester, including the 1962 international hit "Love Letters" which featured Mayorga's sparse piano arrangement, copied note-for-note 25 years later by Alison Moyet on her 1987 UK hit version. He was also credited with arranging Gloria Jones' original 1965 recording of "Tainted Love", and the Standells' 1966 hit single, "Dirty Water", both of which were written by Cobb.

=== Sessions and film work in the 1960s and 1970s ===
As Ketty Lester's success dwindled, Mayorga increasingly worked as a session musician in Los Angeles. He worked particularly closely with singer Phil Ochs on his albums Pleasures of the Harbor, Rehearsals for Retirement, Tape from California and others, and toured with Ochs' "gold lamé suit" tour, culminating in a legendary pair of concerts at Carnegie Hall. In 1966, he became the staff pianist for Walt Disney Studios, and contributed to the soundtracks of such movies as Chinatown, Pete's Dragon, The Rose, and Ragtime. He also worked on TV series including Bonanza, Dallas, Little House on the Prairie and Highway to Heaven.

As a session musician and arranger, he worked with Frank Zappa (on the album Lumpy Gravy), Gloria Jones on her original version of Tainted Love, Sam Cooke, Dory Previn, Johnny Mathis, Barbra Streisand, Mel Torme, Andy Williams and many others. In addition, he recorded a series of ragtime albums under the name Al "Spider" Dugan.

=== Classical and ragtime concerts and recordings since the 1970s ===
In the 1970s, he helped establish the audiophile record company Sheffield Lab, and set up his own label, TownHall Records, which specializes in historical reissues and comprehensive collections of jazz and classical music and is "dedicated to the concept that recordings should preserve permanently the important musical art of our time". In the late 1970s he recorded an album with Lou Busch (aka Joe "Fingers" Carr) on the Sheffield label, The Brinkerhoff Piano Company Salutes the Sentimental Sixties. Singer/songwriter Amanda McBroom teamed up with Mayorga to record two well-received albums on Sheffield, Growing Up in Hollywood Town and West of Oz. In addition he recorded the Irving Berlin Century with vocalist Margie Gibson under the Sheffield banner.

Mayorga also recorded a classical album with trumpeter Jimmy Valves. The album, The Virtuoso Trumpet , was recorded at Gold Star Studio in Hollywood. It is rare but was very well received.

Mayorga relocated to Columbia County in New York in the mid-1980s, and has increasingly worked as a concert pianist. He has also continued to perform in concert in recent years with Bruce Belland, lead singer of the Four Preps, and has released a series of classical and heritage albums on the TownHall label.

The Moscow Philharmonic invited him to perform George Gershwin's Rhapsody In Blue and "I Got Rhythm" Variations, on their first concert devoted to American music. He has toured extensively in North America and Europe, and has collaborated with such musicians as Itzhak Perlman, Richard Stoltzman, Michael Tilson Thomas, Gerard Schwarz, and others. Mayorga has written a piano concerto, Angels' Flight, a tribute to the city of Los Angeles and the music of the cinema, which he has performed with the Henry Mancini Institute Orchestra.

=== Death ===
Mayorga died on July 3, 2023, at the age of 86.

== Discography ==
=== As sideman ===
With Gábor Szabó and Bob Thiele

- Light My Fire (Impulse!, 1967)

=== As leadman ===
- The Missing Linc (Lincoln Mayorga and Distinguished Colleagues) (Sheffield S10, 1974)
- Brahms: Variations and Fuge on a Theme by Handel. Handel: Air with Variations. Chopin: Mazurka in A Minor (Opus 17, No. 4) (Sheffield Lab, LAB-4, 1976)
- The Virtuoso Trumpet as played by Jimmy Valves Pianist: Victor Mayorga
