= Come Go with Me (album) =

Studio album by Gloria Jones
- Released: 1966
- Genre: Soul
- Length: 20:55
- Label: Uptown
- Producer: Ed Cobb

Gloria Jones chronology
It's a Blessing (1964)	Come Go with Me (1966)	Share My Love (1973)

Professional ratings
Review scores
Source	Rating
AllMusic	3/5 stars

Come Go with Me is the debut studio album released by Gloria Jones in 1966. The album is available in mono and stereo versions. "The New 'Heartbeat' Sound That Never Quits".

It is from this period with Ed Cobb that also produced "Tainted Love" and "My Bad Boy's Coming Home." Both songs were later given an album release on 1982's Reunited, once again with Ed Cobb producing. This album has yet to be given an official CD release.

== Track listing ==
Side one
No.	Title	Writer(s)	Length
1.	"Come Go with Me"	Clarence E. Quick	1:53
2.	"Finders Keepers"	Toni Wine; Carole Bayer	1:52
3.	"Heartbeat Part I & II"	Ed Cobb	4:17
4.	"Run One Flight of Stairs"	Cobb	1:58

Side two
No.	Title	Writer(s)	Length
5.	"Yes, I Really Love You"	Cobb	2:28
6.	"How Do You Tell an Angel"	Cobb	1:55
7.	"Only You"	Buck Ram; Ande Rand	2:20
8.	"I Will Always Remember"	Cobb	2:19
9.	"True Love"	Cole Porter	1:53

== Personnel ==
Credits adapted from the liner notes of Come Go with Me.

- Ed Cobb – production (for Greengrass Productions)
- Lincoln Mayorga – arrangement
- Tom May – engineering
- Allen B. Jacobs, Herbert S. Cohen, A. Ross, Rahni Harris – production consultants
- George Jerman – photography
