= Ketty Lester =

American actress and singer (born 1934)

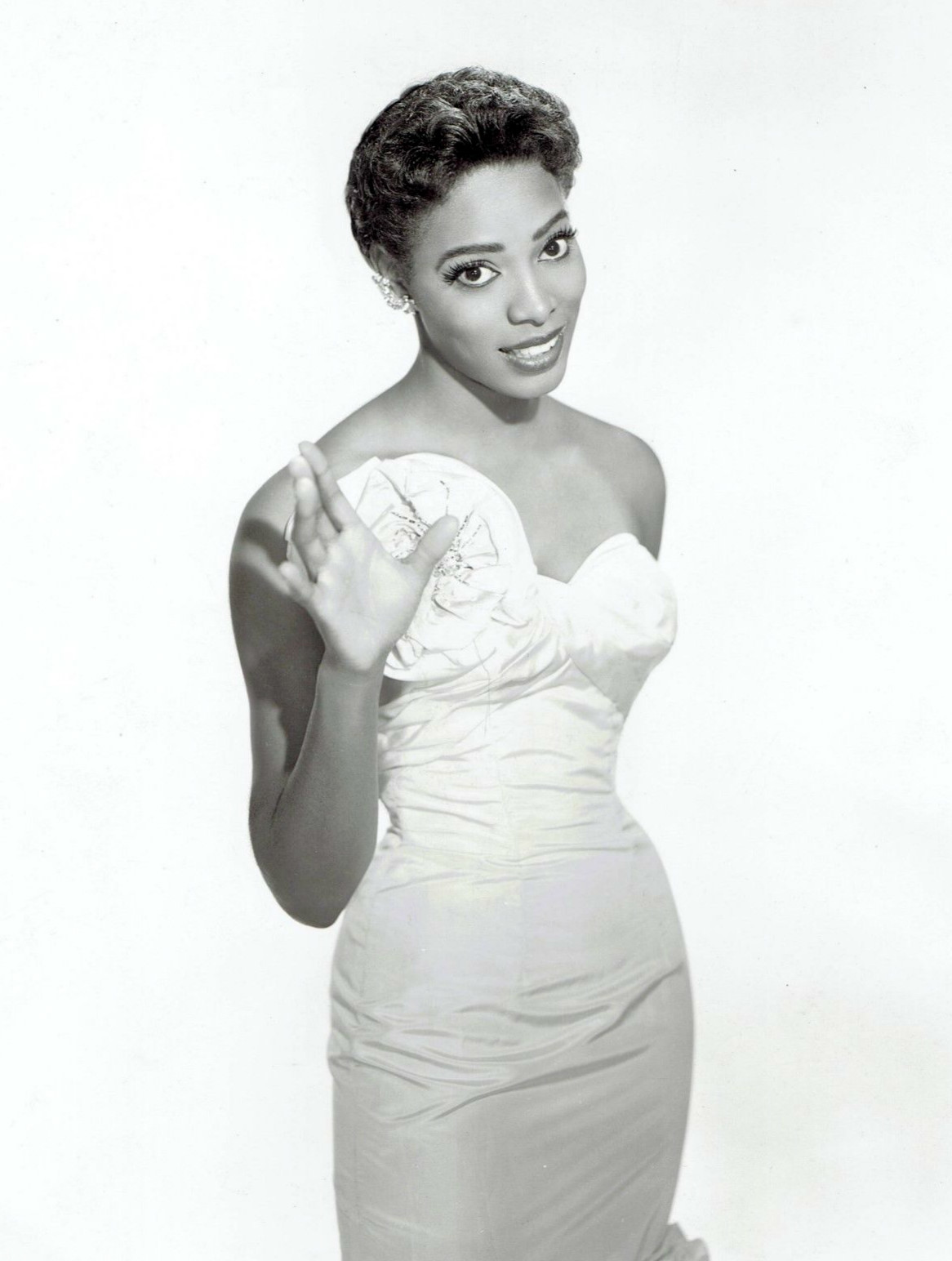
- Lester in 1958

Background information
- Born: Revoyda Frierson; August 16, 1934 (age 92); Hope, Arkansas, U.S.
- Genre: R&B
- Occupations: Singer, actress
- Instrument: Vocals
- Years active: 1957–present
- Labels: Era, RCA, London
- Spouse: Bill Buckley

Ketty Lester (born Revoyda Frierson; August 16, 1934) is an American singer and actress known for her 1961 hit single "Love Letters", which reached the top 5 of the charts in the US and the UK. She is also known for her role as Hester-Sue Terhune on the American television series Little House on the Prairie. In 2022, she was inducted into the Arkansas Black Hall of Fame.

== Life and career ==
Ketty Lester was born Revoyda Frierson on August 16, 1934 in Hope, Arkansas. Her parents, Pearl and Arthur Frierson, were farmers who would eventually have a total of fifteen children. As a young child, Lester first sang in her church, and later in school choirs. She won a scholarship to study music at San Francisco State College, and in the early 1950s, she began performing under the name "Ketty Lester" in the city's Purple Onion club. She later toured Europe and South America as a singer with Cab Calloway's orchestra.

Lester (as Revoyda Frierson) appeared as a contestant on the December 26, 1957, episode of You Bet Your Life, hosted by Groucho Marx. Lester sang "You Do Something to Me". The chosen category was "Mother Goose", a subject she admitted knowing nothing about; George Fenneman fed the correct answers to her, and she and her partner won $1,000.

Returning to California, she recorded her first single, "Queen for a Day", for the Everest label. She was introduced by Dorothy Shay to record producers and songwriters Ed Cobb and Lincoln Mayorga of The Four Preps and The Piltdown Men, who won her a contract with Era Records in Los Angeles. In 1961 they released her single "Love Letters" b/w "I'm a Fool to Want You".

Lester's recording of "Love Letters", which featured Lincoln Mayorga's sparse piano arrangement and Earl Palmer on drums, rose to No. 5 on the Billboard Hot 100 early in 1962. The record also reached No. 2 on the R&B chart and No. 4 on the UK Singles Chart, selling over one million copies, and was awarded a gold disc by the RIAA. In 1991, it was ranked 176th in the RIAA-compiled list of Songs of the Century.

In 1962, she toured the UK as support act on the Everly Brothers tour. The follow-up, a version of George and Ira Gershwin's "But Not for Me" from the musical Girl Crazy, reached No. 41 in the U.S. pop charts and No. 45 in the UK. She released an album, Love Letters, which contained the tracks "You Can't Lie to a Liar" and a cover of Woody Guthrie's "This Land Is Your Land" (both of which were issued as singles) and was nominated for a Grammy in the Best Female Pop Vocal Performance category.

Lester continued to record for Era with little success until 1964, when she signed with RCA. She released several unsuccessful singles for that label, and two albums, The Soul of Me and Where Is Love?, in a more R&B-oriented style that has been compared to Dinah Washington and Nancy Wilson. Some of her earlier recordings also featured on one side of an album shared with previously released tracks by Betty Everett. Also in 1964, she won a Theatre World Award for her performance in the off-Broadway show Cabin in the Sky. She moved to the Tower label, issuing a single and album, When A Woman Loves A Man, an answer record to Percy Sledge's "When a Man Loves a Woman". However, these releases, and later records for the Pete label, including a 1968 album titled Ketty Lester, met with little commercial success.

By the early 1970s, Lester gave up singing commercially and turned to acting. She was reportedly offered the role eventually taken by Diahann Carroll in the 1968–71 TV series Julia, and appeared in a variety of movies, including Uptight (1968), Blacula (1972), Uptown Saturday Night (1974) and The Prisoner of Second Avenue (1975).

Lester established herself as a television actress in the 1970s and 1980s, playing the roles of Helen Grant on Days of Our Lives (1975–77) and as Hester-Sue Terhune on Little House on the Prairie (1977–83), and she appeared on other television shows and movies, including The Night the City Screamed (1980).

Lester recorded an album of gospel music titled I Saw Him in 1984, and returned to films, appearing in Street Knight (1993), and as Aunt Lucy in House Party 3 (1994).

In 2020, she released her memoir, Ketty Lester: From Arkansas To Grammy Nominated Love Letters to Little House on the Prairie. Lester attended the 50th Anniversary Reunion for Little House on the Prairie in 2024, meeting fans and also delivering a sermon on stage.

== Discography ==
=== Albums ===
- Love Letters – ERA, 1962
- Betty Everett & Ketty Lester – 1964 (only on two tracks)
- The Soul of Me – RCA Victor, 1964
- Where Is Love? – Armed Forces Radio & Television Service Station Library, 1965
- When a Woman Loves a Man – Tower, 1966
- Ketty Lester – Records by Pete, Sheffield, 1969
- Ketty Lester in Concert – Sheffield, 1977
- A Collection of Her Best – AVI Records, 1982
- I Saw Love – Mega, 1984

=== Singles ===
Year	Title	Chart positions			Album
Year	Title	U.S. R&B	U.S. Hot 100	UK	Album
1962	"Queen for a Day" b/w "I Said Goodbye to My Love"	—	—	—	Non-album tracks
1962	"Love Letters" b/w "I'm a Fool to Want You"	2	5	4	Love Letters
1962	"But Not for Me" b/w "Once Upon a Time" (from Love Letters)	—	41	45	Non-album tracks
1962	"You Can't Lie to a Liar" b/w "River of Salt"	—	90	—	Non-album tracks
1962	"This Land Is Your Land" b/w "Love Is for Everyone"	—	97	—	Non-album tracks
1963	"Fallen Angel" b/w "Lullaby for Lovers" (Non-album track)	—	—	—	Love Letters
1964	"Some Things Are Better Left Unsaid" b/w "The House Is Haunted (by the Echo of Your Last Goodbye)"	—	127	—	Non-album tracks
1964	"Roses Grow with Thorns" b/w "Please Don't Cry Anymore"	—	—	—	Non-album tracks
1964	"I Trust You Baby" b/w "Theme from 'The Luck of Ginger Coffey'"	—	—	—	Non-album tracks
1964	"You Go Your Way (and I'll Go Crazy)" b/w "Variations on a Theme by Bird"	—	—	—	Non-album tracks
1965	"Pretty Lies, Pretty Make Believe" b/w "(Looking for a) Better World"	—	—	—	Non-album tracks
1965	"I'll Be Looking Back" b/w "West Coast"	—	—	—	Non-album tracks
1966	"Secret Love" b/w "Love Me Just a Little Bit"	—	—	—	Non-album tracks
1966	"When a Woman Loves a Man" b/w "We'll Be Together Again"	—	—	—	When a Woman Loves a Man
1968	"I Will Lead You" b/w "Now That I Need Him"	—	—	—	Non-album tracks
1969	"Cracker Box Livin'" b/w "The Measure of a Man"	—	—	—	Non-album tracks
1969	"Show Me" b/w "Since I Fell for You"	—	—	—	Ketty Lester
1984	"Jesus Laid His Hands on Me" "One Day at a Time"	—	—	—	I Saw Love
1984	"Have You Heard?" b/w "She'd Never Heard of Anyone Called Jesus"	—	—	—	I Saw Love
