= Share My Love =

Share My Love may refer to:

- Share My Love (album), a 1973 album by Gloria Jones
- "Share My Love" (song), a 2012 song by R. Kelly
