= Reunited (Gloria Jones album) =

Studio album by Gloria Jones
- Released: 1982
- Studios: Producers Workshop, Hollywood, California
- Genre: Soul
- Length: 30:40
- Label: AVI
- Producers: Ray Harris, Ed Cobb

Gloria Jones chronology
Windstorm (1978)	Reunited (1981)	The COGIC's (1984)

Reunited is the fifth studio album released by Gloria Jones, in 1982.

The track "Sixty Minutes of Making Love" is dedicated to Marc Bolan.

== Track listing ==
Side One:

1. "Body Heat" (Ed Cobb) 4:41
2. "Tell Me Some More of Your Lies" (Ed Cobb, Gloria Jones) 3:30
3. "I'm Going to Run Away With Him Tonight" (Ed Cobb) 3:47
4. "Tainted Love" (Ed Cobb) 2:11

Side Two:

1. "The Touch of Venus" (Ed Cobb) 4:35
2. "Sixty Minutes of Making Love" (Ed Cobb) 4:25
3. "1980 Baby" (Ed Cobb, Gloria Jones, Ron Baron) 4:50
4. "My Bad Boy's Coming Home" (Ed Cobb) 2:41

== Production ==
- Producer: Ed Cobb
- Executive Producer: Ray Harris & Ed Cobb
- Arranger/Conductor: Cobb, Lewis, Page
- Mixed: Russ Castillo
- Engineer: Russ Castillo
