= Vixen (Gloria Jones album) =

Studio album by Gloria Jones
- Released: 1976
- Studio: AIR (London, UK)
- Genre: Soul
- Length: 37:15
- Label: EMI UK
- Producer: Marc Bolan; Gloria Jones

Gloria Jones chronology
Share My Love (1973)	Vixen (1976)	Windstorm (1978)

Vixen is the third studio album by Gloria Jones, released in 1976. This album features songs written by Marc Bolan, as well as the only two confirmed Bolan and Jones co-writes, "High", and "Cry Baby". It also features an updated version of "Tainted Love", which Gloria originally recorded in 1965.

== Track listing ==
1. "I Ain't Going Nowhere" (Jones, Pam Sawyer)
2. "High" (Marc Bolan, Jones)
3. "Tell Me Now" (Marc Bolan)
4. "Tainted Love" (Ed Cobb)
5. "Cry Baby" (Marc Bolan, Jones)
6. "Get It On (Part 1)" (Marc Bolan)
7. "Go Now" (Larry Banks, Milton Bennett)
8. "Would You Like to Know" (Gloria Jones, Richard Jones)
9. "Get It On (Part 2)" (Marc Bolan)
10. "Drive Me Crazy (Disco Lady)" (Marc Bolan)
11. "Sailors of the Highway" (Marc Bolan)
12. "Stage Coach" (Jones)
