= Dirty Water (album) =

Studio album by the Standells
- Released: June 1966
- Recorded: March 5, 1965; April 4–5, 1966
- Studios: Audio Recording, Seattle; Western Recorders, Hollywood
- Genre: Garage rock
- Length: 27:18
- Label: Tower
- Producer: Ed Cobb

The Standells chronology
The Standells in Person at P.J.'s (1964)	Dirty Water (1966)	Why Pick on Me Sometimes Good Guys Don't Wear White (1966)

Dirty Water is the first studio album by the American rock band the Standells, released in June 1966.

== Background ==
The majority of the album was recorded in the midst of touring in a two-day session on April 4–5, 1966 at Audio Recording in Seattle, Washington. The album title is taken from the song of the same name. The single "Dirty Water" and its B-side "Rari" were recorded on March 5, 1965, at Western Recorders in Hollywood, California.

The song "Dirty Water" was written by the album's producer, Ed Cobb. Its Boston and Charles River references are reportedly based on an experience that Cobb and his girlfriend had with a mugger in Boston in the mid-1960s. As for the Standells band members, they were from Southern California and had never been to Boston before recording the song.

Prior to this album, The Standells had only released three singles and a live album: The Standells in Person at P.J.'s (1964). Dirty Water would become the band's best-selling LP, peaking at #52 on the Billboard charts, and #39 in the Cashbox listings. The "Dirty Water" single fared much better, peaking at #11 in Billboard and #8 in Cashbox.

== Track listing ==
Original Vinyl LP

Side one

1. "Medication" (Minette Alton, Ben DiTosti) – 2:27
2. "Little Sally Tease" (Jim Valley) – 2:35
3. "There's a Storm Coming" (Ed Cobb) – 2:43
4. "19th Nervous Breakdown" (Mick Jagger, Keith Richards) – 3:55
5. "Dirty Water" (Ed Cobb) – 2:48

Side two

1. "Pride and Devotion" (Larry Tamblyn) – 2:15
2. "Sometimes Good Guys Don't Wear White" (Ed Cobb) – 2:37
3. "Hey Joe, Where You Gonna Go?" (Chester Powers)* – 2:10
4. "Why Did You Hurt Me?" (Dick Dodd, Tony Valentino) – 2:30
5. "Rari" (Ed Cobb) – 3:18

CD Version

A CD version of the album, released in 1994, deletes "Sometimes Good Guys Don't Wear White" (as it was also included on the band's follow-up album), and adds six more songs:

10. "Batman" (Neal Hefti) – 3:04
11. "It's All in Your Mind" (Ed Cobb) – 2:38
12. "Love Me" (Dick Dodd, Tony Valentino) – 2:45
13. "Medication" [Instrumental] (Minette Alton, Ben DiTosti) – 2:43
14. "Poor Man's Prison" (Keith Colley, Knox Henderson) – 2:23
15. "Take a Ride" – 2:08

The CD version also features the full-length recording of "Rari", running 5:32. It was edited for the original vinyl LP.

*The CD correctly credits the song "Hey Joe" to songwriter Billy Roberts. It was attributed to Chester Powers on the original LP.

== Personnel ==
The Standells

- Tony Valentino - guitar, harmonica
- Larry Tamblyn - keyboards, backing vocals
- Gary Lane - bass
- Dick Dodd - drums, lead vocals

== Charts ==
Album

Year	Chart	Position	Chart	Position
1966	Billboard Pop Albums	52	Cashbox Pop Albums	39

Singles

Year	Single	Chart	Position	Chart	Position
1966	"Dirty Water"	Billboard Pop Singles	11	Cashbox Pop Singles	8
1966	"Sometimes Good Guys Don't Wear White"	Billboard Pop Singles	43	Cashbox Pop Singles	59

== Sources ==
- Burgess, Charles D.; Nowlin, Bill; Cobb, Ed (2007). Love That Dirty Water: The Standells and the Improbable Red Sox Victory Anthem. Cambridge, Massachusetts: Rounder Books. ISBN 978-1-57940-146-7 – via the Internet Archive.
