= Windstorm (disambiguation) =

A windstorm is a storm, which is a severe weather condition.

Windstorm may also refer to:

- European windstorm, a type of storm in Europe
- Windstorm (album), a 1978 album by Gloria Jones
- Windstorm (film), a 2013 German adventure film
