= Dick Dodd =

American actor and musician (1945–2013)

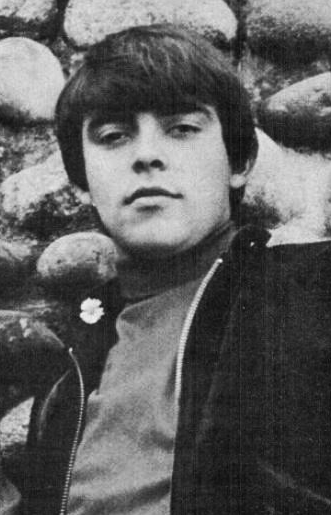
- Dodd in 1966
- Born: Joseph Richard Dodd Jr. October 27, 1945; Hermosa Beach, California, U.S.
- Died: November 29, 2013 (aged 68); Fountain Valley, California, U.S.
- Spouse: Janet Cram-St. Pierre (m. 1969)
- Children: 1

Joseph Richard Dodd Jr. (October 27, 1945 – November 29, 2013) was an American actor and musician who was a cast member of The Mickey Mouse Club starting in its first season, and later a member of several musical groups including The Standells. He was the lead singer on that band's 1966 Billboard hit, "Dirty Water", which includes the refrain "...Boston, you're my home".

== Early life ==
Dodd was a native of Hermosa Beach, California, and joined the cast of The Mickey Mouse Club at the age of nine in 1955, its first season. (He was no relation to series star Jimmie Dodd.) He was a member of the cast for one of the three seasons, and during that time, paid Annette Funicello $20 for a snare drum, which the father of one of his co-stars (Cubby O'Brien) taught him to play. He was later a member of two surf rock bands, The Bel-Airs and Eddie & the Showmen, which he formed with Eddie Bertrand. He appeared as a dancer in the 1963 film musical Bye Bye Birdie, and had television guest roles in the 1960s.

== The Standells ==
Dodd was a drummer and vocalist for the Standells starting in 1964. The group's biggest hit, "Dirty Water", recorded in 1965, became an anthem for sports fans in Boston with its refrain of "Boston, you're my home," despite the group having no direct connection with the city. Dodd sang lead vocals on the recording; it was said of him: "When he opened his mouth, there was that voice: snotty and authoritative, an American Mick Jagger sort of voice....the sound that captures a particular era in '60s garage music." Although the Standells were widely regarded as "one hit wonders", they had several lesser chart hits, and continued to record and tour. Dodd left the group in 1968.

== Later life ==
Dodd continued to perform occasionally, including as Dick Dodd and the Dodd Squad, and the Dodd Squad and in some reunions of the Standells from the 1980s onwards, making his last performance with them in 2012.

In 1968 he released a solo album titled The First Evolution of Dick Dodd.

He also sometimes worked in Buena Park as a limousine driver.

Dodd became a fan of the Boston Red Sox later in life, and learned that the team played the song "Dirty Water" at Fenway Park after that. The song had been chosen as a theme song for the team in 1997. He performed the song with The Standells at the World Series in 2004, and at the team's home opener in 2005.

In 2013 he announced that he had cancer, and died on November 29, 2013.

He was married twice and had a daughter.
