= Vince Cardell =

American pianist (1938–2012)

- Born: Vincent M. Cardile; September 16, 1938; New York City, U.S.
- Died: May 29, 2012 (aged 73)
- Genres: Easy listening, traditional pop
- Occupation: pianist
- Instrument: piano
- Years active: mid 1970s – 2012
- Label: AVI Records
- Formerly of: Liberace
- Website: http://artistecard.com/vincecardell

Vince Cardell (born Vincent M. Cardile; September 16, 1938 – May 29, 2012) was an American pianist who was a protégé of Liberace. Cardell became a significant part of Liberace's act in the late 1970s and released several albums internationally. After separating personally and professionally from Liberace, Cardell continued as a professional pianist until his death.

== Early life and career ==
Cardell was born Vincent M. Cardile on September 16, 1938 in The Bronx, New York. He was earning his living driving a truck delivering diapers, and working as a lounge pianist at a Ramada Inn in New Jersey, when he was introduced to Liberace in 1975. He was immediately hired as Liberace's new stage chauffeur, driving the limousine onto the stage for Liberace's grand entrances.

== Career with Liberace ==
Eventually Liberace came to showcase Cardell's piano abilities alongside him on stage, introducing him as his protégé. As Cardell became more integral to Liberace's act, they would wear identical outfits while performing duets. Cardell lived at Liberace's home for six years, and although Vince was married and had children, Scott Thorson thought that Cardell and Liberace were almost certainly lovers. Liberace produced Cardell's first albums, and he toured with Cardell until their personal relationship soured and their contractual obligations came to an end in 1981.

Cardell's playing and flashy costumes were much like his mentor's. He was reviewed as having a pleasant musical style, but with a tendency to play in an "overblown" manner.

For the last six years of his professional life, Cardell was a fixture at the Gaylord Opryland in a show featuring a water fountain with synchronized lasers and other show lighting. Cardell died on May 29, 2012.

== In film ==
The character of Billy Leatherwood in the HBO movie Behind the Candelabra was based on Cardell and played by Cheyenne Jackson.

== Discography ==
- Liberace Presents Vince Cardell (1975) (duet with Liberace) (AVI Records)
- Piano Gems (1976) (duet with Liberace) (Pye Records)
- Vince (~1977)
- Ebb Tide (1981) (AVI Records)
- Classics Live Behind The Candelabra (2013) (AGR Television Records)
- Country Live Behind The Candelabra (2013) (AGR Television Records)
- Christmas Live Behind The Candelabra (2013 AGR Television Records)
