= AVI Records =

American independent record label

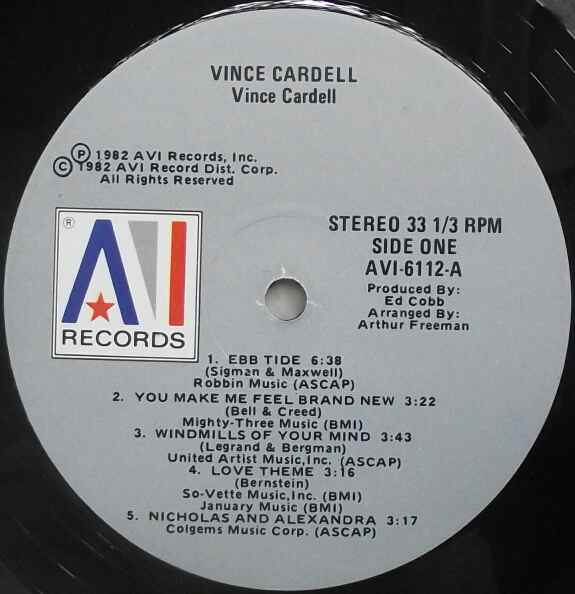

AVI Records was an independent record label established in 1968, as a unit of American Variety International. It released music from numerous genres, and was sufficiently successful with its disco recordings that it began doing its own distribution in 1977.

== History ==
AVI Records began in 1968. It was formed by Seymour Heller, Ed Cobb and Ray Harris. American Variety International was subsequently incorporated in 1972, and Harris became president of the Record division. One of the Los Angeles–based label's earliest signings was Liberace, who was signed to the label through his manager Heller, and stayed with the company for more than 20 years.

The label was initially distributed on a case-by-case basis, usually through either Capitol, MGM Records, Dot Records or Tower. Harris started the label's disco initiative after attending a Midem convention and recognizing the selling potential of mixes and extended cuts. Additionally influenced by Donna Summer, Barry White and Van McCoy, AVI produced an album by studio group El Coco, passing off the product as European. AVI had laid the foundation for its own distribution in 1976, and activated this network in 1977 after having found success in the disco and R&B genres, particularly with El CoCo, while becoming the first label to produce custom jackets for its 12-inch singles. In February 1978, the label hired Rick Gianatos as a special consultant for its disco output, and he was later promoted to general A&R director. One of his initiatives was to court disco DJs by introducing expanded grooves, visual cues at key points in the recording accomplished by increasing the width between grooves. They were the second label after Motown to do this. Dubbed "Q-Mix", the method coincided with an increase in price designed to raise profit margins. After finding success in the disco field, AVI tried its hand in another 1970s musical phenomenon, punk.

AVI Records agreed to acquire Nashboro Records in 1979. As a result, AVI made a concerted effort to expand its gospel efforts by releasing new material as well as reissuing classic Nashboro recordings. By the mid-1990s, the label moved to Santa Monica, California, and was largely limited to releasing previously recorded material. In 1997, the label’s catalogue was acquired by MCA Records, the precursor of Universal Music Group. In 2019, a New York Times article by Jody Rosen alleged that, among many other things, all 9,866 of AVI's master tapes were destroyed in the 2008 Universal fire.

== Artists ==
- Air Power
- Dominic Allen
- Baby Rocker
- Don Bennett
- David Benoit
- Alicia Bridges
- Captain Sky
- Vince Cardell
- Dorothy Love Coates
- The Consolers
- B.C. & M. Choir
- Darkstar
- Davis Import
- Don De Grate Delegation
- Paul Delicato
- The Destinations
- Rev. Isaac Douglass
- Eastbound Expressway
- El Coco
- The Fairfield Four
- The Gospel Keynotes
- L.J. Johnson
- Gloria Jones
- Le Pamplemousse
- Liberace
- Lowrell
- Kenny Lupper
- Arnold McCuller
- Passion
- The Raindolls
- Jerry Rix
- Tony Sandler
- Seventh Avenue
- The Stars of Faith
- Rufus Thomas
- Jesus Wayne
- James Wells
