= Windstorm (album) =

Studio album by Gloria Jones
- Released: 1978
- Genre: Soul
- Length: 36:28
- Label: Capitol
- Producer: Richard Jones

Gloria Jones chronology
Vixen (1976)	Windstorm (1978)	Reunited (1981)

Professional ratings
Review scores
Source	Rating
Smash Hits	3/10

Windstorm is the fourth studio album released by Gloria Jones in 1978. The album was a dedication to Marc Bolan, who died in a car crash in London on September 16, 1977, as on the rear cover, is written: "Special Dedication in memory of my son's father, the late Marc Bolan, whom we miss very much."

== Background ==
On September 16, 1977, a car driven by Jones and containing Bolan as a passenger slammed into a tree in London. Jones was wearing a seat belt at the time of the crash on that day, but Bolan was not wearing a seat belt. She was conscious after the crash. Bolan was found unconscious in the passenger seat of the car, which was dislodged and landed in the rear of the car after the impact. Both had spent the evening having dinner at the Mayfair restaurant. Bolan was pronounced dead at the scene on the arrival of paramedics; Jones survived the crash but was critically injured. She sustained a broken jaw in the crash and was sent directly to the London hospital in critical condition, where she fought for her life. Following recovery from injuries sustained in the crash, and after spending some time in the hospital, Jones finally left the United Kingdom and returned to the United States.

== Track listing ==
1. "Bring on the Love (Why Can't We Be Friends)" (Gloria Jones, Richard Jones, Suzanne DePasse, Tony Jones)
2. "Windstorm" (Lawrence Hill, Richard Jones)
3. "If The Roses Don't Come (In Spring This Year)" (Addison Terry, Gloria Jones, Raymond Gibson)
4. "Blue Light Microphone" (Kevin Beverly, Richard Jones)
5. "Hooked on You Baby" (Kevin Beverly, Richard Jones)
6. "Vaya Con Dios (May God Be with You)" (Buddy Pepper, Inez James, Larry Russell)
7. "Kiss Me, Kiss Me, Kiss Me (Don't Say Goodbye)" (Lawrence Hill, Richard Jones)
8. "Woman Is a Woman" (Lawrence Hill, Richard Jones)

== Personnel ==
- Gloria Jones - vocals
- Ray Parker Jr., Melvin "Wah Wah" Watson - guitar
- Joe Sample - keyboards
- Paul Humphrey - drums
- Jack Ashford, Eddie "Bongo" Brown - percussion
