= The Piltdown Men =

American rock and roll group

The Piltdown Men were an American rock and roll instrumental studio group from Hollywood, California, United States, featuring two lead saxophones.

They were the brainchild of Ed Cobb and pianist Lincoln Mayorga of the Four Preps, and their records were issued on the Capitol label. Their name was inspired by the Piltdown Man hoax. In 1960, their tune "Brontosaurus Stomp", featuring saxophonists Scott Gordon and Jackie Kelso, guitarist Bob Bain, bassist Tommy Tedesco, drummer Alan Brenmanen, and Mayorga on piano, reached No. 75 on the Billboard Hot 100. Helped in large part by The Flintstones premiering that same year.

They were most successful in the UK, where their hits were, beginning in 1960, "McDonald's Cave" (based on "Old McDonald Had a Farm", and originally the B-side of "Brontosaurus Stomp"), "Piltdown Rides Again" (based on Rossini's "William Tell Overture"), and (in celebration of the coincidental start of The Flintstones cartoon series on television) "Goodnight Mrs. Flintstone" (based on "Good Night Ladies" by E. P. Christy). They released no more records after "Night Surfin''" in 1962, produced by Nick Venet.

A compilation LP called The Piltdown Men was released in the Netherlands on Capitol in 1981 and has been reissued several times. A CD compilation album was released on Ace in 1998, entitled The Piltdown Men Ride Again.

== Discography ==
Singles (Release that did not chart are denoted by "-")
Date	A-Side	B-Side	US	UK	NZ
1960	Brontosaurus Stomp	McDonald's Cave	75	14	-
1960	Piltdown Rides Again	Bubbles In The Tar	-	14	-
1961	Goodnight Mrs. Flintstone	The Great Imposter	-	18	9
1961	Gargantua	Fossil Rock	-	-	-
1962	A Pretty Girl Is Like A Melody	A Pretty Girl Is Like A Melody	-	-	-
1962	Night Surfin'	Tequila Bossa Nova	-	-	-
