= Share My Love (album) =

Studio album by Gloria Jones
- Released: 1973
- Genre: Soul
- Length: 36:00
- Label: Motown
- Producer: Tom Thacker

Gloria Jones chronology
| Come Go With Me (1966) | Share My Love (1973) | Vixen (1976) |

Share My Love is the second studio album by Gloria Jones, released in 1973. Dedicated to the memory of Gloria's friend, Lee Jacobs. It was received well by critics and the Motown industry, however was not promoted, as Gloria decided instead to work with Marc Bolan and T. Rex.

In a 2002 interview, conducted by James Ellis, Gloria was quoted: "I had just finished recording an album called Share My Love for Motown and the manager called me and said he wanted to book me into the Continental in LA, where Bette Midler had just broken. I got a call from Marc and he said: 'I need you to come and help me finish an album in Germany.' I made the decision to go with him. I sent my management a telegram from Germany saying: 'Sorry, I'm in love.' "

Share My Love was given its first official CD release in March 2009.

PopMatters rated the album nine out of ten and noted, "Now, with generous remastering by Reel Music, the luster of Share My Love is ever-glistening. A rare gem from the Motown catalog finally gets its due."

== Track listing ==
Side One

1. "Share My Love" (Gloria Jones, Janie Bradford) 6:45
2. "Why Can't You Be Mine" (Gloria Jones, Beverly Gardner) 3:25
3. "Try Love" (Gloria Jones, Raymond Gibson, Addison Terry) 5:00
4. "Tin Can People" (Gloria Jones, Beverly Gardner) 2:30

Side Two

1. "Oh Baby" (Richard Jones, Andre Moore, Delton Williams) 3:30
2. "Old Love, New Love" (Gloria Jones) 4:15
3. "So Tired (Of The Way You're Treating Our Love Baby)" (Gloria Jones, Paul Riser) 4:20
4. "Baby Don'tcha Know (I'm Bleeding For You)" (Gloria Jones) 3:10
5. "What Did I Do To Lose You" (Gloria Jones, Pam Sawyer) 3:05

== Production ==
- Produced by Tom Thacker for Corduroy
- Arranged by Paul Riser (except "Oh Baby" arranged by Richard Jones, Andre Moore and Paul Riser)
- Engineer: John Horton for Cordouroy
- Recordists: Gary Ladinsky, Chris Morris, John Henning, Austin Godsey & Lee Kiefer
- Photography: Fred Marx (cover), Chuck Leopold (liner)

== Personnel ==
On "Share My Love", "Why Can't You Be Mine", "So Tired" and "What Did I Do To Lose You"

- Stan Seymour, David T. Walker - lead guitar
- Roderick "Peanut" Chandler - bass
- Jai Winding - keyboards
- Hubert Heard - organ
- Dale Loyola - drums
- Joe Clayton, Bobbye Hall Porter - congos, percussion
- Greg Abate, Ernie Fields - tenor saxophone on "Share My Love"
- Mike Crawford - trumpet
- David Stout - trombone on "So Tired & What Did I Do To Lose You"
- Gloria Jones, Oma Drake, Stephanie Spruill - backing vocals

On "Try Love", "Baby Don'tcha Know", "Oh Baby", "Old Love New Love" and "Tin Can People"

- Charles Grimes - guitar
- Willie Weeks - bass
- Jai Winding, Andre Moore, Bill Cuomo - keyboards on "Tin Can People"
- Earl Palmer - drums on "Old Love New Love & Baby Don'tcha Know"
- Joe Clayton, Sam Clayton - congos
- Don Menza - tenor saxophone, flute
- Charles Loper - trombone
- Chuck Findley, Paul Hubinon - trumpet
- Ray Pizzi - baritone saxophone
- Neil Levang - mandolin on "Oh Baby"
- Gloria Jones, Gwen Edwards, Marsha Smith, Marsha Temmer, Laura Creamer, Oma Drake, Jessica Smith - backing vocals
