= Gloria Jones =

American singer and songwriter

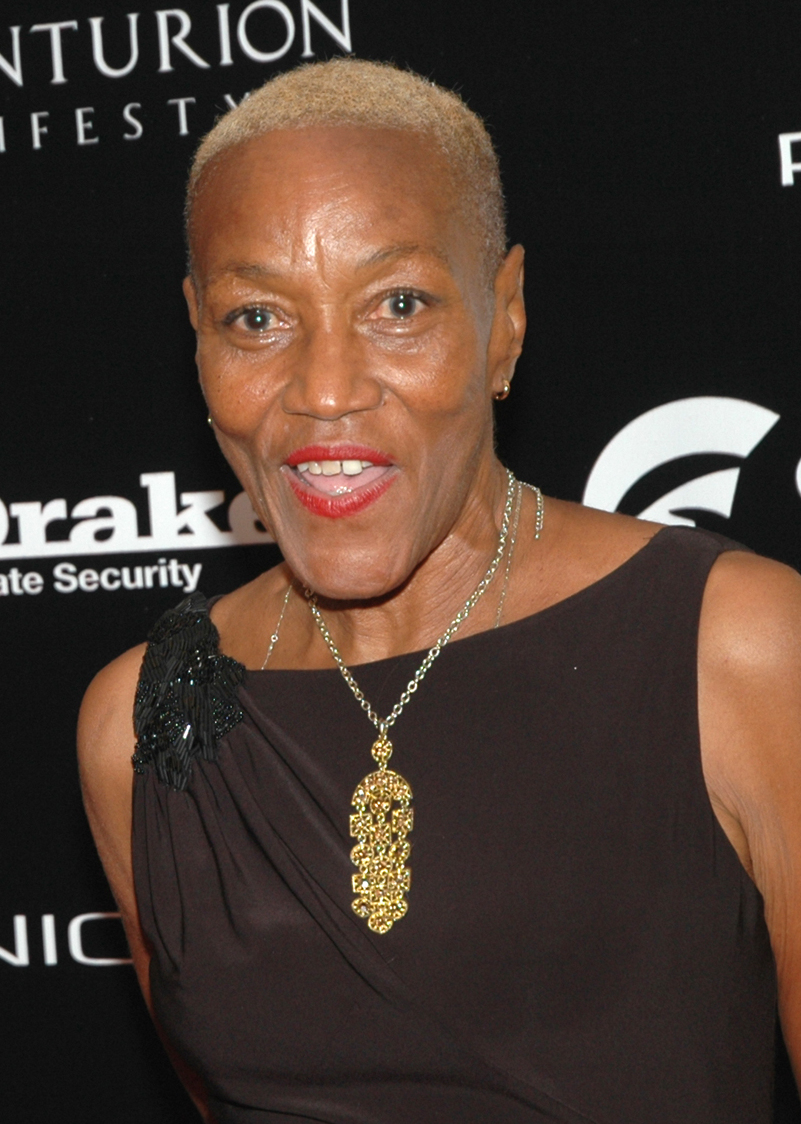
- Jones in 2014

Background information
- Also known as: LaVerne Ware
- Born: October 19, 1945 (age 81); Cincinnati, Ohio, U.S.
- Origin: Los Angeles, California, U.S.
- Genres: R&B; soul; pop; funk; gospel; glam rock
- Occupations: Singer; songwriter; record producer
- Years active: 1960–present
- Labels: Minit; Motown; EMI; Fly; Regal Zonophone; Casablanca; Reprise; Relativity

Gloria Richetta Jones (born October 19, 1945) is an American singer and songwriter who first found success in the United Kingdom, being recognized there as "The Queen of Northern Soul". She recorded the 1965 song "Tainted Love" (later turned into a hit song by Soft Cell) and has worked in multiple genres as a Motown songwriter and recording artist, backing vocalist, and as a performer in musicals such as Hair. In the 1970s, she was a keyboardist and vocalist in Marc Bolan's glam rock band T. Rex. She and Bolan were also in a relationship and had a son together.

== Early life and career ==
Jones was born in Cincinnati, Ohio, and moved to Los Angeles, California, at the age of seven, where she first started singing. Jones' first taste of fame came at the age of 14, when, while still at school, she formed with Frankie Kahrl and Billy Preston the successful gospel group the COGIC Singers, with whom she recorded the album It's a Blessing. Although she remained with the group for some four years, she soon found herself drawn into the Los Angeles pop scene.

In 1964, Jones, in her late teens, was discovered by the songwriter Ed Cobb. Signing with Cobb's Greengrass Productions, she recorded her first hit record, "Heartbeat Pts 1 & 2," which Cobb wrote and produced.

She toured the United States, performing on several American television programs, footage of which still exists. One performance occurred at a Rock and Soul show in Disneyland in the summer of 1965. "Heartbeat" became a rhythm and blues tune which was recorded later by Dusty Springfield, Spencer Davis and many other artists.

By then, Jones had recorded other songs for Uptown Records, a subsidiary of Capitol/EMI. Included among these was another Cobb-written song, "Tainted Love". So strong was Jones's following in Northern England that she was proclaimed "The Queen of Northern Soul".

Jones also recorded an album for the Uptown label entitled Come Go with Me which was released in 1966. Jones studied piano, and acquired an advanced classical degree primarily in the works of Bach.

In 1968, she joined the cast of Catch My Soul, a rock and soul version of the play Othello, which included cast members Jerry Lee Lewis, The Blossoms, and Dr. John. During the summer of 1968, she performed in a play called Revolution, at the Mark Taper Forum in Los Angeles. That winter, she joined the Los Angeles cast of Hair, the musical. Eventually, she was to meet Pam Sawyer, who asked her to write for Motown Records. Jones and Sawyer were amongst the second string of writers at Motown, but still wrote for such artists as Gladys Knight & the Pips, Commodores, The Four Tops and The Jackson 5.

As Jones was also initially a singer for the label, protocol demanded a pseudonym, so for some of her co-writes she used the name LaVerne Ware.

Songs that Jones worked on during this period include The Supremes' "Have I Lost You" (writer), Marvin Gaye and Diana Ross's "My Mistake (Was to Love You)" (writer), Junior Walker's "I Ain't Goin' Nowhere" (writer/producer) and the Four Tops' "Just Seven Numbers (Can Straighten Out My Life)" (writer). In 1970 she provided backing vocals on Ry Cooder's eponymous first album. The best-known song that Jones penned was Gladys Knight and the Pips' "If I Were Your Woman", which was nominated for a Grammy in 1971. Jones left Motown at the end of 1973, following the release of her album Share My Love.

== After Motown ==
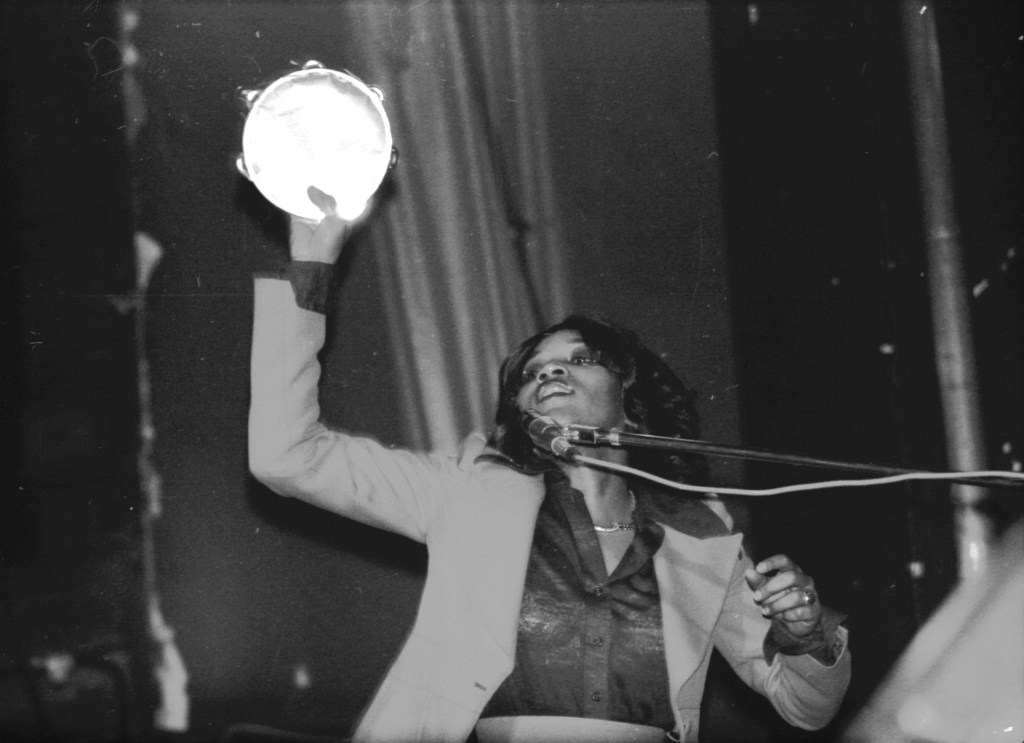
Jones performing with T. Rex in March 1976 in Glasgow, Scotland

Jones first met Marc Bolan of T. Rex in 1969 while performing in Hair (Los Angeles cast). While touring in Europe, Bolan and Jones met for the second time at the Speakeasy in London. In 1972, she was recommended by Warner Brothers' Bob Regehr to sing backing vocals behind T. Rex at Winterland in San Francisco.

Soon after joining T. Rex, Jones and Bolan became romantically involved. They had a son, Rolan Bolan (b. September 26, 1975). She sang backing vocals and played clavinet with T. Rex from 1973 to 1977. Her rendition of "(Sittin' On) The Dock of the Bay" appears as a bonus track on T. Rex's album Bolan's Zip Gun. Jones released an album in 1976, called Vixen, which featured several songs written by Bolan, and he also was the producer for the album.

In 1977, Jones worked with the group Gonzalez, producing several of their singles, and also penning the disco hit, "Haven't Stopped Dancing Yet" for the group. She toured the UK with Gonzalez, first on the Bob Marley tour, and then with Osibisa.

== Automobile accident ==
She was the driver of the car, a Mini 1275 GT, that struck a tree near Barnes Common, killing Bolan at 4:00 a.m. on September 16, 1977, on the way back to Bolan's Richmond property. They had been returning from an evening at a restaurant in Mayfair where they had both been drinking wine. Jones was found, conscious but critically injured, by her brother Richard, with her foot trapped beneath the clutch by the engine. Bolan was found unconscious in the passenger seat, which had been dislodged and landed in the rear of the vehicle. Jones was wearing a seat belt at the time of the crash. Bolan was not wearing a seat belt. Bolan was pronounced dead at the scene on the arrival of paramedics. Jones sustained a broken jaw in the crash and was sent directly to the hospital in London. When she recovered sufficiently to leave hospital, she was informed that Bolan's fans had looted most of their possessions from their house. She was later scheduled to appear in court in London on charges of being unfit to drive and of driving a car in a dangerous condition. She left Britain with her son and returned to the US before the court date, so the Coroner's Court recorded a verdict of accidental death.

== After Marc Bolan ==
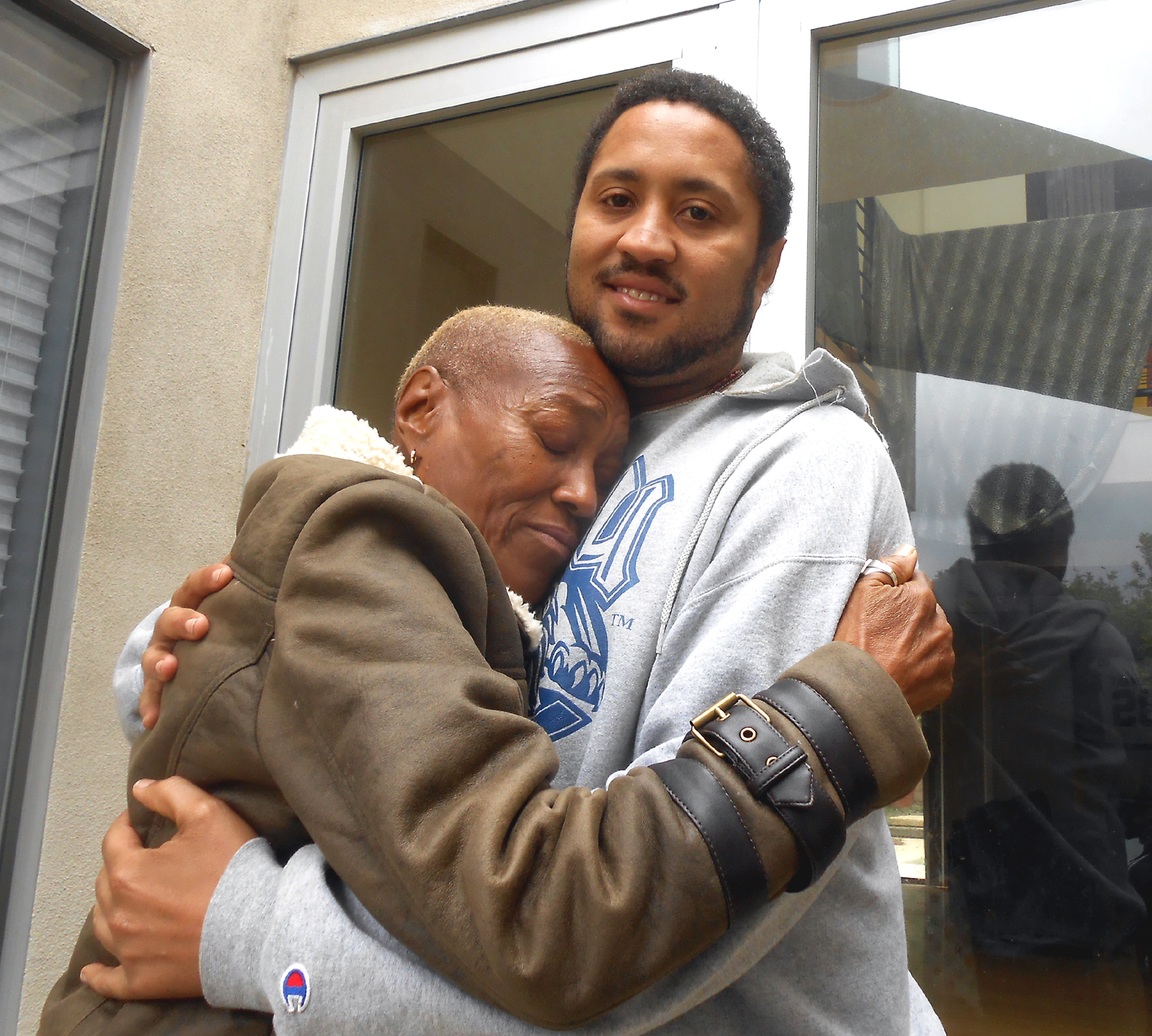
Jones with her son Rolan in 2014

Having lost her possessions, Jones moved with her son back to Los Angeles, where they stayed with Jones's family.

In 1978, she released the album Windstorm, which she dedicated to the memory of Bolan: the back cover reads, "Special dedication in memory of my son's father, Marc Bolan, whom we miss very much." Her single "Bring on the Love" was a success on the American R&B chart.

Jones stayed in the music industry for several years after, releasing an album produced by Ed Cobb, titled Reunited in 1981. She also collaborated again with Billy Preston and other Cogic Singers for a 1984 reunion album The Cogic's. She has since worked as a musical supervisor for films.

On her 1982 album Reunited, she was proclaimed "Queen of Northern Soul."

In 2010, together with her son Rolan, she established the Marc Bolan School of Music & Film in Makeni, Sierra Leone.

== Discography ==
=== Solo studio albums ===
- 1966 – Come Go with Me
- 1973 – Share My Love
- 1976 – Vixen (not released in the US)
- 1978 – Windstorm
- 1982 – Reunited
- 1996 – Vixen / Windstorm (CD release)
- 2009 – Share My Love (CD release)

=== With T. Rex ===
- 1974 – Zinc Alloy and the Hidden Riders of Tomorrow
- 1974 – Light of Love
- 1975 – Bolan's Zip Gun
- 1976 – Futuristic Dragon
- 1977 – Dandy in the Underworld

=== With The COGIC'S ===
- 1966 – It's a Blessing
- 1984 – The COGIC'S

=== US solo singles ===
Year	A-side/B-side	Catalog no.
1964	"My Bad Boy's Coming Home" / "Tainted Love"	Champion 14003
1965	"Heartbeat (Part 1)" / Heartbeat (Part 2)"	Uptown 712
1966	"Finders Keepers" / "Run One Flight of Stairs"	Uptown 724
1966	"Come Go with Me" / "How Do You Tell an Angel"	Uptown 732
1968	"I Know" / "What About You"	Minit 32046
1969	"Look What You Started" / "When He Touches Me"	Minit 32051
1973	"Why Can't You Be Mine" / "Baby Don't Cha Know (I'm Bleeding for You)"	Motown 1256
1978	"Bring on the Love" (Single Version) / "Cry Baby"	Capitol 4563
1978	"Bring on the Love" (Album Version) / "Bring on the Love"	Capitol 12" 4563
1978	"Woman Is a Woman" / "Blue Light Microphone"	Capitol 4662
1979	"When I Was a Little Girl" / "When I Was a Little Girl"(Inst)	Capitol 4762
1982	"My Bad Boy's Coming Home" / "We Gotta All Get Together"	AVI 187
1982	"My Bad Boy's Coming Home" / "Tainted Love"	AVI 338

== UK solo singles (selection) ==
- 1973 – "Tin Can People" / "So Tired"
- 1976 – "Get It On (Part 1)" / "Get It On (Part 2)"
- 1976 – "I Ain't Going Nowhere" / "Simplicity Blues"
- 1976 – "Tainted Love" (New Version) / "Go Now" (Album Version) (12" – MAXI)
- 1977 – "To Know You Is to Love You" / "City Port" (with Marc Bolan)
- 1977 – "Go Now" (Single Version) / "Drive Me Crazy (Disco Lady)"
- 1977 – "Bring on the Love" (Single Version) / "Cry Baby"
- 1977 – "Bring on the Love" (Album Version) / "Bring on the Love" (Instrumental)
- 1978 – "When I Was a Little Girl" /"When I Was a Little Girl" (Instrumental)
- 1978 – "Windstorm" / "Blue Light Microphone"
- 1979 – "Listen to Me" / "Father I'm Coming Home" (From the v/a Double Album Alpha Omega)

=== Backing vocal work ===
- 1966 with Denny Brooks on Denny Brooks
- 1966 with Gary St. Clair on Gary St. Clair
- 1966 with Charles Wright & the Watts 103rd Street Rhythm Band on Music For The Times We Live In
- 1968 with Neil Young on Neil Young
- 1968 with Jackie DeShannon on "Put a Little Love in Your Heart"
- 1969 with the Brothers and Sisters of Los Angeles on Dylan's Gospel
  - Gloria sings lead on "I Shall Be Released", "Chimes of Freedom", and "I'll Be Your Baby Tonight"
- 1970 with Ry Cooder on Ry Cooder
- 1970 with Daniel Moore on Daniel Moore
- 1971 with Jesse Davis on Jesse Davis
- 1971 with Ry Cooder on Into the Purple Valley
- 1971 with REO Speedwagon on REO Speedwagon
- 1971 with Roy Ayers/Roy Ayers Ubiquity on He's Coming
- 1971 with Alan Gerber on Alan Gerber Album
- 1972 with Buffy Saint Marie on Moonshot
- 1972 with Elvin Bishop on Rock My Soul
- 1972 with Delaney Bramlett on Some Things Coming (Heartbeat)
- 1973 with Judee Sill on Heart Food
- 1973 with Little Feat on Dixie Chicken
- 1973 with John Kay on My Sportin' Life
- 1973 with Maria Muldaur on Maria Muldaur
- 1973 with Joe Cocker on Joe Cocker
- 1973 with Eddie Floyd on Soul Street
- 1973 with REO Speedwagon on Ridin' the Storm Out
- 1974 with Michael Edward Campbell on Michael Edward Campbell
- 1974 with The Commodores on Machine Gun
- 1975 with Michael Masser on The Original Soundtrack of Mahogany
- 1975 with Harry Nilsson on Duit on Mon Dei
- 1977 with Billy Preston on Whole New Thing
- 1977 with T. Rex on Dandy in the Underworld
- 1978 with Steve Harley on Hobo With a Grin
- 1979 with Billy Preston on Late at Night
- 1980 with Lonnie Liston Smith on Love is the Answer

=== Songwriting and production ===
Song	Artist	Date	Writer(s)	Producer
"Bad Seed"	Chris Clark	1969	Gloria Jones, Pam Sawyer	Deke Richards
"Black Mail"	David Ruffin	1969	Jones, Sawyer	Henry Cosby
"Teenage Symphony"	Jackson 5	1973 (issued 1986)	Gloria Jones, Hal Davis, Marilyn McLeod	Hal Davis
"I Ain't Goin' Nowhere"	Junior Walker & The All Stars	1977	Jones, Sawyer	Jones, Sawyer, Junior Walker
"If I Can't Love You Then I Can't Love Me"	Eddie Kendricks	197-	Jones, Sawyer	Gloria Jones
"Nothing Is Real"	Eddie Kendricks	197-	Jones, Sawyer	Gloria Jones
"Piece of Clay"	Marvin Gaye	197-	Gloria Jones	Gloria Jones
"My Love Is Yours"	The Sisters Love	1973	Gloria Jones, Josef Powell	Gloria Jones, Willie Hutch
"You've Got My Mind"	The Sisters Love	1972	Jones, Sawyer	Gloria Jones, Pam Sawyer
"When My Love Hand Comes Down"	David & Jimmy Ruffin	1970	Jones, Sawyer	Bobby Taylor
"Your Love Was Worth Waiting For"	David & Jimmy Ruffin	1970	Jones, Sawyer	Bobby Taylor
"Black Mail"	Bobby Taylor & the Vancouvers	1970	Jones, Sawyer	Henry Cosby
"Christmas Won't Be the Same This Year"	Jackson 5	1970	Jones, Sawyer	Hal Davis
"2-4-6-8"	Jackson 5	1970	Jones, Sawyer	The Corporation
"If I Were Your Woman"	Gladys Knight & The Pips	1970	Jones, Sawyer, Clay McMurray	Clay McMurray
"Just Seven Numbers (Can Straighten Out My Life)"	Four Tops	1970	Jones, Sawyer	Frank Wilson
"Earthquake"	Martha Reeves & The Vandellas	1970	Jones, Sawyer, Johnny Bristol	Johnny Bristol
"Let's Go Back to Day One"	Eddie Kendricks	1971	Gloria Jones, Patrice Holloway	Frank Wilson
"Take Me Girl, I'm Ready"	Rahsaan Roland Kirk	1971	Jones, Sawyer, Johnny Bristol	Joel Dorn
"Have I Lost You"	The Supremes	1971	Jones, Sawyer	Gloria Jones
"I Ain't That Easy to Lose"	The Supremes	1971	Jones, Sawyer	Clay McMurray
"Don't Tell Me I'm Crazy"	Edwin Starr & The Fantastic Four	1972	Jones, Sawyer	Terry Johnson
"I Don't Need No Reason"	Junior Walker & The All Stars	1973	Jones, Sawyer	Hal Davis
"I Don't Need No Reason"	The Miracles	1973	Jones, Sawyer	Frank Wilson, Leonard Caston
"Take Me Girl, I'm Ready"	Junior Walker & The All Stars	1973	Jones, Sawyer, Johnny Bristol	Johnny Bristol
"I'm Learning to Trust My Man"	The Sisters Love	1973	Jones, Sawyer	Hal Davis
"Where Do You Go (Baby)"	Eddie Kendricks	1973	Jones, Sawyer	Gloria Jones, Pam Sawyer
"There's a Lesson to Be Learned"	Gladys Knight & The Pips	1973	Jones, Sawyer	Clay McMurray
"A Million to One"	Jermaine Jackson	1973	Phil Medley	Gloria Jones, Pam Sawyer
"Give Me Your Love"	The Sisters Love	1973	Curtis Mayfield	Gloria Jones
"(I Could Never Make) A Better Man Than You"	The Sisters Love	1973	Gloria Jones, Janie Bradford	Gloria Jones
"Master of My Mind"	Gladys Knight & The Pips	1971	Jones, Sawyer, Clay McMurray	Clay McMurray
"It's Too Late To Change The Time"	Jackson 5	1974	Jones, Sawyer	Hal Davis
"Do It Again"	New Birth	1974	Jones, Sawyer	Harvey Fuqua
"The Assembly Line"	The Commodores	1974	Jones, Sawyer	Gloria Jones, Pam Sawyer
"The Zoo (The Human Zoo)"	The Commodores	1974	Jones, Sawyer	Gloria Jones, Pam Sawyer
"My Mistake (Was to Love You)"	Diana Ross & Marvin Gaye	1974	Jones, Sawyer	Hal Davis
"Let's Go Back to Day One"	Mahogany Soundtrack	1975	Gloria Jones, Patrice Holloway	Gil Askey
"No One Could Love You More"	Gladys Knight & The Pips	1975	Jones, Sawyer	Johnny Bristol
"All We Need Is a Miracle"	Gladys Knight & The Pips	1975	Jones, Sawyer	Bobby Taylor
"Don't Tell Me I'm Crazy"	Gladys Knight & The Pips	1975	Jones, Sawyer	Bobby Taylor
"I Hate Myself for Loving You"	Gladys Knight & The Pips	1975	Jones, Sawyer	Bobby Taylor
"It's Bad for Me to See You"	Yvonne Fair	1975	Jones, Sawyer	Gloria Jones, Pam Sawyer
"I Ain't That Easy to Lose"	Bettye Swann	1975	Jones, Sawyer	Mickey Buckins
"Love Is Lovelier"	Walter Jackson	1976	Jones, Sawyer	Carl Davis
"I've Got It Bad Feelin' Good"	Walter Jackson	1976	Jones, Sawyer	Carl Davis
"If I Ever Lose This Heaven"	G.C. Cameron	1976	Jones, Sawyer	Hal Davis, James Carmichael, Winston Monseque
"Haven't Stopped Dancing Yet"	Gonzalez	1976	Gloria Jones	Gloria Jones, Richard Jones
"Rockin' on My Porch"	The Jackson Sisters	1976	Jones, Sawyer	Albert Hammond, Don Altfel
"Sweet Beginnings"	Marlena Shaw	1977	Gloria Jones, John Bettis	Bert DeCoteaux
"Brandy (You're a Fine Girl)"	Gonzalez	1977	Elliot Lurie	Gloria Jones
"Just Let It Lay"	Gonzalez	1977	Gloria Jones	Gloria Jones
"Share My Love"	Rare Earth	1977	Gloria Jones, Janie Bradford	Cal Harris
"Tin Can People"	Rare Earth	1977	Gloria Jones, Beverly Gardner	Cal Harris
"You"	Billy Preston	1979	Gloria Jones, Richard Jones	Billy Preston
"One Day I'll Marry You"	Jackson 5	1979	Jones, Sawyer	Hal Davis

== Filmography ==
Year	Film	Role
2012	Jobriath A.D.	Herself
2013	20 Feet from Stardom	Herself

== See also ==
- List of disco artists (F-K)

== Bibliography ==
- Davis, Sharon (1988). Motown – The History. Guinness Publishing Limited. ISBN 0-85112-894-7.
- Bogdanov, Vladimir (2003). All Music Guide to Soul: The Definitive Guide to R&B and Soul. Hal Leonard Corporation. p. 374. ISBN 9780879307448.
