= Dirty Water =

1965 single by The Standells

- Label on the 1965 US single

Single by the Standells

from the album Dirty Water
- B-side: "Rari"
- Released: November 1965
- Recorded: March 5, 1965
- Studio: Universal, Hollywood
- Genre: Garage rock; proto-punk
- Length: 2:48
- Label: Tower
- Songwriter: Ed Cobb
- Producer: Ed Cobb

The Standells singles chronology
"Don't Say Goodbye" (1965)	"Dirty Water" (1965)	"Sometimes Good Guys Don't Wear White" (1966)

"Dirty Water" is a song by the American rock band the Standells, written by their producer Ed Cobb. Recorded and released in 1965, the song is a mock paean to the city of Boston, Massachusetts, and its then-famously polluted Boston Harbor and Charles River.

== History ==
According to Standells keyboardist Larry Tamblyn, at least some of the song (notably the reference to "lovers, muggers, and thieves") was inspired by a mugging of producer Ed Cobb in Boston. In addition to the Charles River, other local interest items in the song include the Boston University women's curfew—"Frustrated women ... have to be in by 12 o'clock"—and a passing mention of the Boston Strangler—"have you heard about the Strangler? (I'm the man I'm the man)."

The well-known guitar riff that opens the song was recorded with a Fender Telecaster through a Vox AC30 amplifier by Standells guitarist Tony Valentino. Although Cobb received sole songwriting credit, Tamblyn has stated that the band "completely restructured it ... and made it into what it was", and "we didn’t get any credits for writing nor arranging."

== Reception ==
"Dirty Water" was first issued in late 1965 on the Tower label, a subsidiary of Capitol Records. It first became a hit in the state of Florida, breaking out on WLOF in Orlando in January 1966.

The song debuted on the Cash Box charts on April 30, 1966, and peaked at No. 8. It reached No. 11 on the Billboard Hot 100 chart on June 11. It was the band's first major hit single; their earlier charting record, "The Boy Next Door", had only reached No. 102 on Billboard's Bubbling Under chart in February 1966.

"Dirty Water" was included in the influential compilation album Nuggets: Original Artyfacts from the First Psychedelic Era, 1965–1968 and is listed in the Rock and Roll Hall of Fame's "500 Songs that Shaped Rock and Roll".

Dirty Water was also the title of the Standells' most successful LP, their only nationally charting album. This LP charted on both Billboard and Cash Box magazines' charts, peaking at No. 52 and No. 39, respectively, during the summer of 1966.

== Use by sports teams ==
The song is traditionally played by Boston sports teams following home victories. The National Hockey League's Boston Bruins began playing it in 1995, and Major League Baseball's Boston Red Sox followed suit after home victories beginning in the 1997 season.

The Standells performed the song live at Fenway Park prior to Game 2 of the 2004 World Series. The song is also included in the soundtrack for the 2005 film Fever Pitch, which focuses on the 2004 Red Sox season.

Starting in April 2019, Liverpool F.C., a club in the English Premier League, began playing "Dirty Water" after home matches. The club is owned by Fenway Sports Group, which also owns the Red Sox.

== Personnel ==
- Dick Dodd – drums, lead vocal
- Gary Lane – backing vocal, bass guitar
- Larry Tamblyn – backing vocal, Vox Continental organ
- Tony Valentino – backing vocal, electric guitar, harmonica

== Chart history ==
Chart (1966)	Peak position
U.S. Billboard Hot 100	11
Canada RPM	11

== Covers and samples ==
- British garage rock revivalists The Inmates covered "Dirty Water" in 1979 (and replaced Boston and the Charles with London and the River Thames), a version which was a moderate hit and reached #51 on the Billboard Hot 100 singles chart in January 1980. This song was promoted with customized promo versions recorded for many towns distributed to radio stations. For example, the promo copy played on Jackson, Mississippi's WZZQ said "Pearl River" and "Jackson you're my home".

== See also ==
- List of 1960s one-hit wonders in the United States

== Sources ==
- Burgess, Charles D.; Nowlin, Bill; Cobb, Ed (2007). Love That Dirty Water: The Standells and the Improbable Red Sox Victory Anthem. Cambridge, Massachusetts: Rounder Books. ISBN 978-1-57940-146-7 – via the Internet Archive.
