= Ed Cobb =

American musician (1938–1999)

Background information
- Born: Edward Cornelius Cobb; February 25, 1938; South Pasadena, California, U.S.
- Origin: South Pasadena, California, U.S.
- Died: September 19, 1999 (aged 61) Honolulu, Hawaii, U.S.
- Genre: Pop
- Occupations: Musician-songwriter; record producer
- Instruments: Vocals; piano; keyboard
- Years active: 1956–1966 (performer); continued as songwriter/producer afterward

Edward Cornelius Cobb (February 25, 1938, South Pasadena, California – September 19, 1999, Honolulu, Hawaii) was an American musician, songwriter, and record producer, most notably during the 1950s and 1960s. He is notable for writing the song "Tainted Love" for Gloria Jones, which later became a hit worldwide when it was covered by Soft Cell.

== Career ==
=== The Four Preps ===
Cobb was a member of the pop group the Four Preps from its discovery in 1956 until he left the group in 1966, three years before it disbanded. His biggest hit with the group was "26 Miles (Santa Catalina)" which reached number two on the Billboard Hot 100, number six on the Billboard R&B chart, and number 11 in Canada in 1958.

=== Songwriting ===
His composition "Every Little Bit Hurts" became a hit for Brenda Holloway on Motown in 1964.

Cobb wrote the song "Tainted Love" for Gloria Jones, released in 1965, which Soft Cell reworked in 1981 into one of the biggest pop hits of the 1980s.

He also wrote a number of songs for the American rock band The Standells. He wrote their 1966 top ten hit "Dirty Water" and multiple other songs for the band.

He is credited for Rihanna’s 2006 song “SOS" which sampled "Tainted Love".

=== Record production ===
After his performing career ended, Cobb became fully focused on work as a record producer and sound engineer, which he had already begun doing by the Four Preps' breakup.

He worked with such acts as the Standells, the Lettermen, Ketty Lester, the Chocolate Watch Band, the Piltdown Men, Fleetwood Mac, Steely Dan, and Pink Floyd. Cobb also wrote songs for many of his acts, most famously 1966's "Dirty Water" for the Standells, 1964's "Every Little Bit Hurts" for Brenda Holloway, and 1965's "Tainted Love".

Throughout his producing and engineering career, Cobb earned thirty-two gold and platinum records, and three Grammy Award nominations.

== Personal life ==
In his private life, Cobb was a champion horse breeder and, for a short while, served as president of the Idaho Racing Commission.

Cobb died of leukemia on September 19, 1999, in Honolulu, Hawaii, at the age of 61.

== Songs ==
Cobb wrote, or co-wrote the following songs, most notably recorded by the artists noted:

- "Heartbeat" – Gloria Jones, later covered by the Remo Four
- "Brontosaurus Stomp" – The Piltdown Men
- "Dirty Water", "Barracuda", "Sometimes Good Guys Don't Wear White" (later covered by Minor Threat, the Outlets, and the Vaccines), "Why Pick on Me" – The Standells
- "Every Little Bit Hurts" – Brenda Holloway, Aretha Franklin, Gladys Knight & the Pips, Etta James, Petula Clark, Cilla Black, the Small Faces, George Clinton, The Spencer Davis Group, Jeffrey Osborne, Teena Marie, The Clash, The Jam, Alicia Keys, Graeme "Shirley" Strachan.
- "I'll Always Love You", "You Are Very Much a Part of Me" – Brenda Holloway
- "No Way Out", "Sweet Young Thing" – The Chocolate Watchband
- "Tainted Love" – originally recorded by Gloria Jones in 1964 but her version did not chart. Significantly reworked by Soft Cell and released in 1981, becoming a No. 1 hit in 17 countries and remaining one of the most enduring pop songs of the 1980s. Later covered by Coil, Marilyn Manson, the Scorpions, Imelda May, and reworked for the hit song "SOS" by Rihanna.
