= Janet Lansbury =

American parenting educator

- Born: Evanston, Illinois, U.S.
- Education: North Hollywood High School; UCLA (one year); Resources for Infant Educarers
- Occupations: podcaster; author; educator; actress (formerly); model (formerly)
- Years active: 1973–1995 (actress); 1996–present (educator)
- Spouse: Michael Lansbury (m. 1990)
- Children: 3
- Relatives: Angela Lansbury (aunt in law); Bruce Lansbury (uncle in law)
- Website: janetlansbury.com

Janet Lansbury (née Janet Louise Johnson) is an American parenting educator, podcaster, blogger, author, and former actress, credited as Janet Julian and Janet Louise Johnson during her acting career.

== Early life and education ==
Lansbury was born Janet Julian in Evanston, Illinois, and raised in the San Fernando Valley, California. She graduated from North Hollywood High School. According to The New Yorker article Janet Lansbury’s Gospel of Less Anxious Parenting, she had graduated from high school at 16. She later attended the University of California, Los Angeles (UCLA) for one year, before moving to New York to become a model. She was a print and commercial model, appearing in Teen and Seventeen, and doing commercials for Herbal Essences shampoo.

== Acting career ==
Lansbury went by the name Janet Louise Johnson when she got her big break when she had won the role of Nancy Drew in the 1970s television series The Hardy Boys/Nancy Drew Mysteries when Pamela Sue Martin left the show in 1978. Her other well-known TV role came a year later on the cult TV series B. J. and the Bear as Tommy. She appeared on the evening soap opera Falcon Crest in 1989 as Diane 'Cookie' Nash.

Lansbury made guest appearances on several TV shows, among them Battlestar Galactica; The Fall Guy; Knight Rider; Simon & Simon, Fudge; Columbo; Swamp Thing; 240 Robert; Murder, She Wrote; and Diagnosis: Murder. Her first film role was in the 1978 movie Big Wednesday. She appeared in two films directed by Abel Ferrara: Fear City (1984) and King of New York (1990).

== Teaching ==
Lansbury left acting in 1995 to raise her first child with husband Michael Lansbury. Shortly after the birth of her child, she encountered the parenting philosophy of Magda Gerber, and attended her first Resources for Infant Educarers (RIE) class. After finishing the class, she began to train under Gerber. She became a member of the Board of Directors of RIE in 1996 and teaches RIE Parent/Infant Guidance Classes.

In 2009, she began a parent education blog. She later published two books, Elevating Child Care: A Guide to Respectful Parenting and No Bad Kids: Toddler Discipline Without Shame.

In 2015, Lansbury launched Janet Lansbury: Unruffled, a podcast series about respectful parenting. As of 2022, her podcast had nearly a million monthly listeners.

== Personal life ==
Julian has been married to Michael Lansbury since 1990. They have three children together.

== Filmography ==
=== Film ===
Year	Film	Role	Other notes
1978	Big Wednesday	Party Girl	Credited as 'Janet Johnson'
1981	Smokey Bites the Dust	Peggy Sue Turner	
1982	Humongous	Sandy Ralston	
1984	Fear City	Ruby	
1984	Ghost Warrior	Chris Welles	
1986	Choke Canyon	Vanessa Pilgrim	
1990	King of New York	Jennifer	
1990	Taking Care of Business	Woman on Plane	
1991	Heaven Is a Playground	Dalton Ellis	

=== Television ===
Year	Title	Role	Other notes
1973	Alias Smith and Jones	Belle Haney	Episode: "Only Three to a Bed"; Credited as Janet Johnson
1973	The Waltons	Naomi Atkins	Episode: "The Triangle"; Credited as Janet Johnson
1978	The Hardy Boys/Nancy Drew Mysteries	Nancy Drew	4 episodes
1978–79	Battlestar Galactica	Lt. Brie	4 episodes
1979	The Misadventures of Sheriff Lobo	Tommy	Episode: "The Day that Shark Ate Lobo"
1979	California Fever	Sharon	Episode: "Centerfold"
1979	240-Robert	Carol	Episode: "Earthquake"
1979–81	B. J. and the Bear	Tommy	8 episodes
1980	Here's Boomer	Samantha	Episode: "Private Eye"
1981	Enos		Episode: "The Hostage"
1982	Today's FBI		Episode: "Bank Job"
1982	The Fall Guy	Elizabeth	Episode: "Hell on Wheels"
1983	Simon & Simon	Tracy Penn	Episode: "Design for Killing"
1984	Knight Rider	Jody Tompkins	Episode: "The Ice Bandits"
1989	Falcon Crest	Cookie Nash	6 episodes
1989	Columbo	Jill	Episode: "Sex and the Married Detective"
1991–93	Swamp Thing	Dr. Ann Fisk	4 episodes
1991–93	Murder, She Wrote	Bonnie Hartman, Ellen Harper	2 episodes
1994	Diagnosis: Murder	Melanie	Episode: "Woman Trouble"
1995	Fudge	Jaguar Maiden	Episode: "My Grandmother the Card"
