= Anne Lockhart (actress) =

American actress (born 1953)

- Lockhart in B. J. and the Bear, 1980
- Born: Anne Kathleen Maloney; September 6, 1953 (age 73); New York City, New York, U.S.
- Other name: Annie Lockhart
- Education: Verde Valley School
- Occupation: Actress
- Years active: 1957–present
- Known for: Jory; Battlestar Galactica; Gidget's Summer Reunion; Joyride; Chicago Fire
- Spouse: Adam C. Taylor (m. 1986; died 1994)
- Children: 2
- Mother: June Lockhart
- Relatives: Gene Lockhart (grandfather); Kathleen Lockhart (grandmother)

Anne Kathleen Lockhart (born Anne Kathleen Maloney; September 6, 1953) is an American actress. She is best known for her role as Lieutenant Sheba in the 1978–79 television series Battlestar Galactica.

== Early life ==
Anne Lockhart is the older of June Lockhart's two daughters, and the granddaughter of actors Gene and Kathleen Lockhart. Her father was John F. Maloney, June Lockhart's first husband.

Lockhart attended Verde Valley School in Sedona, Arizona, appearing in her first school play as a senior there.

== Career ==
=== Television ===
Lockhart began her career at the age of four, starring as Annie in the short film "T Is for Tumbleweed", which was nominated for an Academy Award in the category Best Live Action Short Film. She frequently accompanied her mother to the set of Lassie, where she made five uncredited appearances between 1959 and 1962. She began making credited guest appearances in 1965 starting with the Death Valley Days episode "Magic Locket". She has since made over 60 guest appearances in network television shows, including multiple appearances on series such as Knight Rider; Simon & Simon; The Fall Guy; Murder, She Wrote; and Diagnosis: Murder. In 1979, she appeared as Lieutenant Sheba in 11 episodes of Battlestar Galactica. She also appeared as Officer Kathy Mulligan in the CHiPs episode "The Return of the Super Cycle", and in the episode "A Dream of Jennifer" on Buck Rogers in the 25th Century.

In 1980, she appeared in a Magnum PI episode "Lest We Forget" playing a World War II flashback version of character Diane Westmore played by her mother June Lockhart. Through the 1980s and '90s, Lockhart appeared steadily in a variety of credited and uncredited roles primarily on television series. She appeared on Airwolf in episodes, "Random Target" in season two and "Day of Jeopardy" in season three, playing different characters.

In the 2000s and 2010s, Lockhart had several recurring and multiepisode minor roles on series such as The Lying Game, Dragnet, The West Wing, NCIS, the Law & Order franchise shows, and Chicago Fire. These roles were often "uncredited" and as a "policewoman". She also had similar one-time roles on shows such as Studio 60 on the Sunset Strip, Raines, and Chase. She also appeared in B. J. and the Bear in the episode "Fire in the Hole".

=== Film ===
Lockhart's first film role was playing Dora in the 1973 Western Jory. That same year, she appeared in the critically acclaimed Hallmark Hall of Fame episode Lisa, Bright and Dark, alongside Kay Lenz, Anne Baxter, and John Forsythe. She then appeared in the films Slashed Dreams (1975) and Joyride (1977), with Robert Carradine and Melanie Griffith. She played the young Eunice St. Clair in the 1986 horror film Troll, with her mother playing the older version of her character. Her other film credits include Just Tell Me You Love Me (1978), Hambone and Hillie (1983) opposite Lillian Gish, Young Warriors (1983), The Oasis (1984), The Serpent Warriors (1985), Dark Tower (1989), Big Bad John (1990), Bug Buster (1998), A Dog's Tale (1999), Daybreak (2000), Cahoots (2001), Hollywood, It's a Dog's Life (2004), ExTerminators (2009), and Dakota's Summer (2014).

Though Lockhart herself claims no recollection of being approached, she was reportedly John Carpenter's first choice to play the role of main character Laurie Strode in Halloween (1978). Other commitments kept her from doing so, and the part was played by Jamie Lee Curtis in the original and 6 sequels.

=== Other acting ===
In addition to her television and film appearances, Lockhart has also worked extensively in television commercials and voice acting. In 1997, she began working with Lane Davies to form the Kingsmen Shakespeare Festival, the forerunner of the Kingsmen Shakespeare Company, which offers seminars and summer camps aimed at teaching children ages 8–16 various acting techniques. In recent years she has appeared onstage as Eleanor in The Lion in Winter (2010) and as Virginia in It's Only a Play (2016) at River City Repertory Theatre.

== Personal life ==
On December 24, 1986, Lockhart married Adam Carlyle Taylor, the son of Gunsmoke actor Buck Taylor and Judy Nugent. They had two children, daughter Carlyle, and son Zane. Taylor died in a motorcycle accident in Ennis, Montana on June 4, 1994 at the age of 27.

A Catholic, Lockhart met Pope John Paul II in 1985 when she was invited to attend a papal audience in St. Peter's Square. She is also an expert horsewoman, having won championships in cutting, reining, team penning, and barrel racing.

== Filmography ==
=== Film ===
Year	Title	Role	Notes	Ref.
1958	T Is for Tumbleweed	Annie	Short film directed by Louis Clyde Stoumen	
1972	Fuzz	Girl in Car Wreck	Action comedy film directed by Richard A. Colla; Uncredited	
1973	Jory	Dora	Western film directed by Jorge Fons	
1975	Slashed Dreams	Tina	Thriller film directed by James Polakof	
1977	Joyride	Cindy Young	Adventure film directed by Joseph Ruben	
1978	Beyond and Back	Additional voice	Documentary film and "death-sploitation flick" directed by James L. Conway	
1978	Convoy	Dispatcher	Action film directed by Sam Peckinpah; Based on the 1975 country and western novelty song "Convoy" by C. W. McCall; Uncredited	
1978	Just Tell Me You Love Me	Kris	Comedy film directed by Tony Mordente; Also known as Maui	
1981	Earthbound	Mom	Comic science fiction film directed by James L. Conway; Uncredited	
1982	Cannery Row	Barmaid	Comedy drama film directed by David S. Ward and co-written by Ward & William Graham; Based on the novels of the same name and Sweet Thursday. by John Steinbeck; Uncredited	
1982	E.T. the Extra-Terrestrial	Nurse	Science fiction film produced and directed by Steven Spielberg, and written by Melissa Mathison; Uncredited	
1983	10 to Midnight	Murder Victim	Crime-horror-thriller film directed by J. Lee Thompson; Uncredited	
1983	Risky Business	Babysitter	Coming-of-age comedy film written & directed by Paul Brickman; Uncredited	
1983	The Graduates of Malibu High	Lucy	Crime-drama film directed by Lawrence D. Foldes; Also known as Young Warriors	
1983	Hambone and Hillie	Roberta Radcliffe	Comedy drama film directed by Roy Watts	
1985	Flesh+Blood	Wife	Romantic erotic historical adventure drama film directed by Paul Verhoeven; Originally titled God's Own Butchers, was also known as The Rose and the Sword; Uncredited	
1985	Head Office	Secretary	Satirical black comedy film written and directed by Ken Finkleman; Uncredited	
1985	The Serpent Warriors	Laura Chase	Crime-horror film directed by John Howard and Niels Rasmussen	
1986	Troll	Young Eunice St. Clair	Horror film; younger version of character played by mother June Lockheart	
1987	Dark Tower	Elaine	Horror film	
1990	Big Bad John	Lady Police Officer	Western film	
1998	Bug Buster	Cammie Griffin	Comedy Horror film	
2001	Route 666	Radio Dispatcher	Action Horror film	

=== Television ===
Year	Title	Role	Notes	Ref.
1959–62	Lassie	Little Girl	Episode: "The UNICEF Story"	
1959–62	Lassie	Annie	Episode: "Yochim's Christmas"	
1959–62	Lassie	Christine	Episode: "Double Trouble"	
1959–62	Lassie	Little Girl	Episode: "The Musher"	
1965	Death Valley Days	Child	Episode: "Magic Locket"	
1972	Cannon	Tabby	Episode: "A Deadly Quiet Town"	
1972	Owen Marshall, Counselor at Law	Tessa	Episode: "Words of Summer"	
1972	The Sixth Sense	Diana	Episode: "Dear Joan: We're Going to Scare You to Death"	
1973	The Magician	Mary Rose Coogan	Episode: "Pilot"	
1973	The Wonderful World of Disney	Karen Jorgenson	Episode: "Fire on Kelly Mountain"	
1973	Lisa, Bright and Dark	Elizabeth	Made-for-TV Movie directed by Jeannot Szwarc; Based on the novel of the same name by John Neufeld	
1974	Sierra	Kate	Episode: "Panic at Cathedral Creek"	
1974	Get Christie Love!	Bobbi	Episode: "Bullet from the Grave"	
1975	Three for the Road	Betsy	Episode: "Ride on a Red Balloon"	
1975	Happy Days	Marcia	Episode: "Three on a Porch"	
1977	Barnaby Jones	Wendy Millikan	Episode: "Death Beat"	
1977	The Hardy Boys/Nancy Drew Mysteries	Sarah Masters	Episode: "The Mystery of the African Safari"	
1978	The Steel Inferno	Sue Adams	Made-for-TV Movie directed by Georg Fenady; First movie made of the Emergency! series	
1978	Police Story	Judy Lawrence	Episode: "A Chance to Live"	
1978	Daddy, I Don't Like It Like This	Additional voice	Made-for-TV Movie directed by Adell Aldrich	
1978	The Hardy Boys/Nancy Drew Mysteries	Jess	Episode: "The Last Kiss of Summer" (Parts 1 & 2)	
1978	Project U.F.O.	Ann Booth	Episode: "Sighting 4019: The Believe It or Not Incident"	
1978	Donner Pass: The Road to Survival	Additional voice	Made-for-TV Movie directed by James L. Conway	
1978	The Eddie Capra Mysteries	Ellen Cordrey	Episode: "Breakout to Murder"	
1978	The Deerslayer	Additional voice	Made-for-TV Movie directed by Dick Friedenberg; Uncredited; Based on the novel of the same name by James Fenimore Cooper	
1978–79	Battlestar Galactica	Lieutenant Sheba	12 Episodes	
1979	Beyond Reason	Guest	Episode: "16 March 1979 "	
1979	CHiPs	Patrolman Kathy Mulligan	Episode: "Return of the Supercycle"	
1979	B. J. and the Bear	Lillian Pogovich	Episode: "Pogo Lil"	
1979	The Incredible Hulk	Karen Mitchell	Episode: "Captive Night"	
1980	B. J. and the Bear	Lillian Pogovich	Episode: "Fire in the Hole"	
1980	Buck Rogers in the 25th Century	Leila Markeson / Jennifer	Episode: "A Dream of Jennifer"	
1980	Hagen	Sheila	Episode: "King of the Hill"	
1981	Magnum, P.I.	Diane Westmore	Episode: "Lest We Forget"	
1981	Spider-Man and His Amazing Friends	Guest	Episode: "The Triumph of the Green Goblin" (Pilot); Credited as Annie Lockhart	
1981	The Incredible Hulk	Audrey	Episode: "The Phenom"	
1981	Spider-Man and His Amazing Friends	Guest	Episode: "Spidey Goes Hollywood"; Credited as Annie Lockhart	
1982	Darkroom	Stage Actress	Episode: "Exit Line / Who's There? / The Rarest of Wines"	
1982	ABC Weekend Special	Teacher / Barmaid	Episode: "Miss Switch to the Rescue"; Sequel to The Trouble with Miss Switch; Based on the 1981 children's book of the same name by Barbara Brooks Wallace	
1982	The Fall Guy	Robin Stevens	Episode: "The Snow Job"	
1982	Spider-Man and His Amazing Friends	Storm	Episode: "A Fire-Star Is Born"	
1982	Magnum, P.I.	Brenda & Cassie McCutchen	Episode: "Flashback"	
1982	Tales of the Gold Monkey	Martha	Episode: "The Lady and the Tiger"	
1982	Knight Rider	Sherry Benson	Episode: "Good Day at White Rock"	
1982	Voyagers!	Amy Jone	Episode: "Merry Christmas, Bogg"	
1983	The Paper Chase	Kathy Norman	Episode: "Cinderella"	
1983	Knight Rider	Jennifer Shell	Episode"Return to Cadiz"	
1983	Spider-Man and His Amazing Friends	Lightwave / Aurora Dante	Episode: "Mission: Save the GuardStar" (Series finale)	
1983	The Fall Guy	Sally	Episode: "Inside, Outside"	
1984	T. J. Hooker	Ellen Butler	Episode: "Hot Property"	
1984	Automan	Tracy Morgan	Episode: "Death by Design"	
1984	Lottery!	Guest	Episode: "Minneapolis: Six Months Down"; Series finale	
1984	Scene of the Crime	Mrs. Cooper	Episode: "The Babysitter"	
1984	Murder, She Wrote	Grace Earl Lamont	Episode: "Deadly Lady"	
1984	The Oasis	Anna	Made-for-TV Movie directed by Sparky Greene	
1985	E/R	Lois	Episode: "A Change in Policy"; Series finale	
1985	Gidget's Summer Reunion	Larue Powell	Made-for-TV Movie directed by Bruce Bilson	
1984–86	Airwolf	Various	Random Target, Day of Jeopardy	
1989	Murder, She Wrote	Roz Briggs	Episode: "Three Strikes, You're Out"	
1994-2001	Diagnosis: Murder	Andrea Rivers	Episode: "Murder in the Family"	
1994-2001	Diagnosis: Murder	Jean Malone	Episode: "Frontier Dad"	
1994-2001	Diagnosis: Murder	various	12 episodes (uncredited)	
1994	Bionic Ever After?	Carolyn MacNamara	Made-for-TV Movie directed by Steve Stafford	
1995	Simon & Simon: In Trouble Again	Megan Glenneyre	Made-for-TV Movie directed by John McPherson	
1997	Walker, Texas Ranger	Dr. Linda Morgan	Episode: "Brainchild"	
1999	JAG		Episode "Psychic Warrior"	
2017	Star Trek Continues	Thaius	A fan-created web series. Episode 9: What Ships Are For	
2019	To Tell the Truth	Contestant	Episode: Season 4, Episode 8	
2012–2021	Chicago Fire	Dispatcher	98 episodes (uncredited)	
