= Jory (film) =

1973 film by Jorge Fons

- Theatrical poster
- Directed by: Jorge Fons
- Screenplay by: Gerald Herman; Robert Irving
- Based on: Jory (novel) by Milton R. Bass
- Produced by: Howard G. Minsky; Leopoldo Silva; Gerald Herman; Jerry Herman; Barry Minsky
- Starring: John Marley; B.J. Thomas; Robby Benson; Claudio Brook; Patricia Aspíllaga; Brad Dexter
- Cinematography: George Stahl
- Edited by: Fred Chulak
- Music by: Al De Lory
- Distributed by: AVCO Embassy Pictures
- Release date: February 1973
- Running time: 97 minutes
- Country: United States
- Language: English
- Budget: $1 million

Jory is a 1973 American Western film directed by Jorge Fons and starring Robby Benson in the title role. It was adapted from the 1969 novel of the same name by Milton R. Bass.

== Cast ==
- John Marley as Roy Starr
- B.J. Thomas as Jocko
- Robby Benson as Jory Walden
- Claudio Brook as Ethan Walden
- Patricia Aspíllaga as Carmelita Starr
- Brad Dexter as Jack
- Benny Baker as Frank Jordan
- Todd Martin as John Barron
- Quintín Bulnes as Walker
- Carlos Cortés as Logan
- John Kelly as Thatcher
- Anne Lockhart as Dora
- Ted Markland as Cpl. Hap Evans
- Linda Purl as Amy Barron
- Eduardo López Rojas as Cookie

== See also ==
- List of American films of 1973
