= Joyride (1977 film) =

1977 film by Joseph Ruben

- Movie Poster
- Directed by: Joseph Ruben
- Written by: Peter Rainer; Joseph Ruben
- Produced by: Hal Landers; Bobby Roberts; Bruce Cohn Curtis
- Starring: Desi Arnaz, Jr. Robert Carradine; Melanie Griffith; Anne Lockhart
- Cinematography: Stephen M. Katz
- Edited by: Bill Butler
- Music by: Jimmie Haskell
- Distributed by: American International Pictures
- Release date: June 1977 (United States)
- Running time: 92 minutes
- Country: United States
- Language: English

Joyride is a 1977 adventure film directed by Joseph Ruben, and written by Ruben and Peter Rainer.

== Plot ==
Scott and the couple John and Suzie go to Alaska to make money salmon fishing. They enter a bar and the two men get drunk. Suzie meets an older man working for the oil pipeline who says he can get all three of them a job. The older man gives Suzie his card while Scott and John sleep off their drunkenness. The next morning, they find their car has been broken into and robbed. Desperate for money, the two men land pipeline jobs with the older man's help; Suzy gets a waitressing job. They walk out of a food market with a shopping cart of unpaid-for meat while it is being robbed.

Scott goes to a bar and meets Cindy, but gets turned off when Cindy asks Scott for money to go home with her. Scott then buys three pistols, and all three spend the day improving their shooting abilities. Scott pulls a gun on his coworkers to stop them from robbing the pipeline of equipment. Scott is fired and John is threatened off his job the next day. Suzie quits her job because she keeps getting groped by her employer. All three are forced out of their apartment. Cindy and Scott go into the back seat of a car for some fun, but two guys from the pipeline pull Scott out of the car and beat him. Scott's former boss Sanders lets him know he is responsible for the beating.

The three sell their car to survive. Scott and John steal Sanders' car, take it for a joyride, and end up totaling it at a garbage dump. The two men then go back to the bar and win enough money at a peeing contest to buy a 1957 Pontiac. Also among the winnings is an endorsed payroll check from the pipeline. Because the payroll office refuses to cash this check, they rob the office at gunpoint and then use Cindy as a hostage to escape the police. They switch from the stolen robbery car to their purchased 1957 Pontiac, which gets a flat tire and has no spare. The men shoot a bear for food, then tie Cindy up in the car while riding a ferry. Cindy says they should ransom her off for $300,000. After Scott calls the pipeline company with a ransom demand, all four break into a house and party naked in its hot tub. They instruct the pipeline company to deposit the ranson in an open railroad car. The representative follows the train which results in a car chase and pistol shots through the window when he spots them picking up the money, but they escape by flipping the representative's car during the chase. After switching from a stolen car to their purchased 1957 Pontiac, they abandon Cindy at a police station. They do not spend the ransom money because the serial numbers on the bills are probably being watched. They get a job melting scrap metal.

After John catches Scott showering with Susie, he gets mad and steals a camera while being caught on surveillance tape. John throws some of the stolen money at the shop owner, who then tries to choke him as he drives away. John tries to leave alone, but all three reconcile and they all drive away together. John is still angry, so he pulls over and has a shoving match with Scott on the highway, while almost getting hit by a passing car. Abandoning their 1957 Pontiac for another stolen car, they run a U.S.–Canada border checkpoint after they think that the officer has recognized them. After running another road block and surviving a shotgun blast through a window, they drive into the Canadian mountains where their car runs out of gas. John and Susie sleep the night in the car, while Scott searches for another vehicle. Scott succeeds, but John appears to have died from exposure. Luckily, Scott manages to slap John awake, and he, John, and Susie drive away in the newly stolen truck, talking of a better future.

== Principal cast ==
| Actor | Role |
|---|---|
| Desi Arnaz, Jr. | Scott |
| Robert Carradine | John |
| Melanie Griffith | Susie |
| Anne Lockhart | Cindy Young |
| Tom Ligon | Frank Sanders |
| Cliff Lenz | Officer Henderson |
| Robert Loper | Simon Williams |
| Diana Grayf | Rhonda |

== Production ==
The film was shot in Roslyn and Granite Falls, Washington and on the Hood Canal Bridge. Chuck Russell worked as production manager and assistant director.

On Nov. 23, 1976, a cameraman was killed while shooting a car chase scene for the film near Port Angeles, Washington. Charles A. Parkinson Jr., 31, was leaning out of a car window when the vehicle, which was supposed to go into a skid and slide sideways, instead rolled over. Parkinson was killed while the other passenger received a minor injury and the driver was unharmed.
