= Resources for Infant Educarers =

International nonprofit based in Los Angeles

Resources for Infant Educarers (RIE, pronounced /raɪ/) is a Los Angeles-based non-profit worldwide membership organization dedicated to improving the quality of infant care and education through teaching, supporting, and mentoring. It advocates showing respect for a baby’s experience and encourages parents to treat their children as active participants rather than passive objects. The name RIE is also used to describe the approach to childcare that the organization advocates.

RIE was founded by the educator Magda Gerber and the pediatric neurologist Thomas Forrest in 1978. It rose to prominence in the 21st century, when it was adopted by Early Head Start programs.

== History ==
The roots of RIE go back to Hungary in the 1930s. Magda Gerber worked with the pediatrician Emmi Pikler at Loczy, also known as The Pikler Institute, an orphanage located in Budapest, Hungary, and named after the street of which it was located. Their approach was based on documented, naturalistic observations of many hundreds of babies. After the Second World War, Gerber took what she learned from Pikler and morphed it into an approach that could be used for parents and their children naming it the Educaring Approach. Respect and Authenticity are the basis for RIE and the Educaring Approach. In the late 1950s, the family fled to Los Angeles. Together with Tom Forrest, Gerber established RIE in her new home in 1978. The group remained there until her death in 2007. When Gerber’s family sold her house, the group moved to a space on Melrose Avenue.

The method attracted media attention when several celebrities started attending RIE baby groups or employing RIE educators. They included Hollywood stars Tobey Maguire, Penélope Cruz, Helen Hunt, Jamie Lee Curtis, Jason Alexander, and Felicity Huffman and her husband William H. Macy, as well as fashion designer Minnie Mortimer and her husband, screenwriter Stephen Gaghan, and L.A. Philharmonic conductor Gustavo Dudamel. In Hollywood, the requests for nannies knowledgeable in RIE increased in 2015.

In 2009, the Resources for Infant Educarers group started offering teacher training in Manhattan. The organization also has outposts in New York, Sacramento, Santa Cruz, Boulder, Tulsa, Tampa and Melbourne, Fla., as well as in Alberta and Ontario. In addition to parenting classes and educator certification, RIE publishes parenting books, teaching manuals, and DVDs.

In October 2010, the method went mainstream as RIE teaching materials arrived at 1,700 federally funded Early Head Start programs for families with infants and toddlers nationally.

== Method ==
RIE advocates showing respect for a baby’s experience, such as talking to them in a clear simple way but without "baby talk". Parents are helped to raise self-confident, self-reliant and co-operative children. RIE opposes the trend of helicopter parenting and advises "stepping back and giving your baby a chance to develop at her own pace rather than constantly bothering her with stimulating activities and educational toys".

This is achieved by interpreting cries as communication, rather than alarms; by making a safe, quiet environment filled with simple toys that promote active imaginations (no mobiles or TVs); and by taking a backseat instead of steering the baby toward a certain place or goal. Objects that are considered disrespectful to a baby include sippy cups, high chairs, baby gyms, baby carriers, baby swaddles, and baby walkers, which Gerber called "a moving prison". Parents practising RIE tell their children what they’re doing with them and why, such as asking them if they can pick them up and pausing so they can be prepared.

Parents are taught the method in weekly sessions for children from three months to three years. Many of the babies who attend RIE classes subsequently attend Montessori pre-schools. The more devoted parents are encouraged to take RIE training, where adult students experience what it feels like to be ignored or over-parented.

The RIE philosophy is explained in the book "Baby Knows Best" by Deborah Carlisle Solomon, who was the executive director of RIE for eight years.

RIE has been described as "a kinder, gentler, slowed down way of parenting", encouraging parents to treat their children as active participants rather than passive objects.
