= Brad Dexter =

American actor (1917–2002)

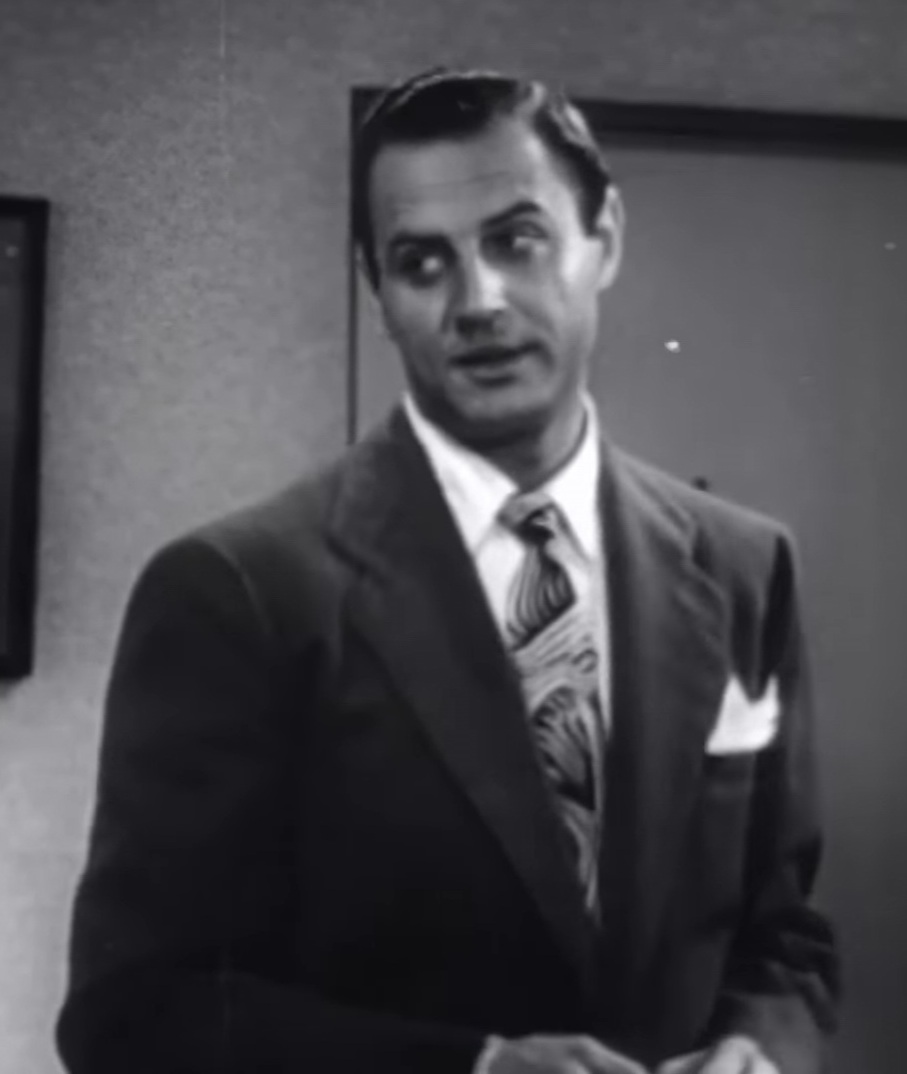
- Dexter in Heldorado (1946)
- Born: Boris Michel Soso; April 9, 1917; Goldfield, Nevada, U.S.
- Died: December 12, 2002 (aged 85); Rancho Mirage, California, U.S.
- Resting place: Desert Memorial Park, Cathedral City, California, U.S.
- Other names: Boris Milanovich; Boris Mitchell Soso; Barry Mitchell
- Occupations: Actor, producer
- Years active: 1939–1988
- Spouses: Peggy Lee (m. 1953; div. 1953) Mary Bogdanovich (m. 1971; died 1994) June Dyer (m. 1994)

Brad Dexter (born Boris Michel Soso; April 9, 1917 – December 12, 2002) was an American actor and film producer. He is known for tough-guy and western roles, including the 1960 film The Magnificent Seven (1960), and producing several films for Sidney J. Furie such as Lady Sings the Blues. He is also known for a short marriage to Peggy Lee, a friendship with Marilyn Monroe and for saving Frank Sinatra from drowning. Dexter's tough-guy roles contrasted with his easygoing and friendly real-life personality.

== Early life ==
Dexter was born in Goldfield, Nevada, the second of three sons born to Marko and Ljubica Šošo (later known as Marko and Violet Soso), ethnic Serb immigrants from Bosnia-Herzegovina. Serbian was Dexter's first language.

The family soon relocated to Los Angeles, where he attended Belmont High School. Tall, burly and handsome with bright blue eyes, Dexter was usually given supporting roles as a rugged character. After a stint as an amateur boxer, Dexter attended the Pasadena Playhouse, where he studied acting. He had a small role in The Mortal Storm (1940). During World War II, he enlisted in the U.S. Army Air Corps, where he met and befriended Karl Malden, a fellow Serbian-American, and appeared uncredited in the Corps play and film Winged Victory (1944).

== Acting career ==
After the war, Dexter had a role in Heldorado (1946), a Roy Rogers western, as "Barry Mitchell". He was also credited under this name in Sinbad the Sailor (1947). He appeared on Broadway in Magnolia Alley (1949).

He changed his name to Brad Dexter, playing a villainous detective in The Asphalt Jungle (1950) and landing a role in Fourteen Hours (1951). Dexter's breakthrough role was as a villain in RKO's The Las Vegas Story (1951), starring Victor Mature and Jane Russell. RKO cast him in a similar part in Macao (1952), also with Russell. RKO signed him to a contract.

Dexter played a villain in 99 River Street (1953). He then signed a contract with 20th Century Fox, appearing in Untamed (1955), Violent Saturday (1955) for director Richard Fleischer, House of Bamboo (1955) for director Samuel Fuller, The Bottom of the Bottle (1956), and Between Heaven and Hell (1956) again with Fleischer.

Dexter played a villain in The Oklahoman (1957), produced by Walter Mirisch, and also appeared in Run Silent Run Deep (1958), again as a villain.

=== First TV work ===
Dexter then shifted largely into television, appearing in episodes of Climax!, The Gale Storm Show, How to Marry a Millionaire, Pursuit, Studio One in Hollywood, Wagon Train, Bat Masterson, Have Gun – Will Travel, Zane Grey Theatre, Behind Closed Doors, Cimarron City, Yancy Derringer, This Man Dawson, 77 Sunset Strip, Colt 45, The Man from Blackhawk, Tightrope, Mr. Lucky, Bat Masterton, and Wanted: Dead or Alive, starring Steve McQueen.

=== Further film work ===
Even after embarking into television, Dexter still made the occasional feature film, such as Last Train from Gun Hill (1959), directed by John Sturges, and Vice Raid (1959), and was second billed in 13 Fighting Men (1960).

He was then cast as gunman Harry Luck, an acquaintance of Chris Adams (Yul Brynner) in The Magnificent Seven (1960), directed by John Sturges for Walter Mirisch's production firm The Mirisch Company. Both Sturges and Mirisch had worked with Dexter before. He was praised for his work as the upbeat opportunist Harry, and it became his best-known role and most famous film.

=== Return to television ===
The success of The Magnificent Seven did not immediately benefit Dexter's career: he returned to television, guest starring in The Aquanauts, Hawaiian Eye, General Electric Theatre, Tales of Wells Fargo, Surfside 6, The Investigators, and Alcoa Premiere. He could be seen in It Started in Tokyo (1961), The George Raft Story (1961) (playing Bugsy Siegel), X-15 (1962) with Charles Bronson and Johnny Cool (1963). Dexter supported Yul Brynner again in Taras Bulba (1962), Kings of the Sun (1963) (from the producers of Magnificent Seven), and Invitation to a Gunfighter (1964).

In 1963, Dexter was cast as California Supreme Court Justice David S. Terry in "A Gun Is Not a Gentleman" on the syndicated anthology series, Death Valley Days, hosted by Stanley Andrews. Carroll O'Connor portrayed U.S. Senator David C. Broderick of California, who was mortally wounded by Justice Terry in an 1859 duel. Though past allies in the Democratic Party, Terry, a slavery advocate, challenged the anti-slavery Broderick.

=== Work with Frank Sinatra ===
Dexter, a friend of Frank Sinatra, helped save Sinatra from drowning on May 10, 1964, during production of the World War II film None but the Brave (1965) on the island of Kauai, Hawaii. Sinatra and Ruth Koch, the wife of producer Howard Koch, were swimming when they were swept out to sea by the outgoing tide and nearly drowned. Sinatra's co-star Dexter and two surfers swam out and rescued them. Dexter was later awarded a Red Cross medal for his bravery. Grateful, Sinatra made him vice president of Sinatra Enterprises.

After Dexter appeared in Bus Riley's Back in Town (1965), he made another film with Sinatra, Von Ryan's Express (1965). That year, Dexter complained that acting made him "frustrated as hell. As an actor you don't have control over the medium you're in... you have no control over your destiny."

Dexter produced The Naked Runner (1967), which starred Sinatra and was filmed in London. Dexter and director Sidney J. Furie clashed with Sinatra over the latter's unwillingness to finish the film, and, after it was completed, Dexter resigned. "I was the only guy who dropped Sinatra ... I couldn't put up with his nonsense", Dexter said at the time. Publicly, Dexter denied any falling out with Sinatra. He claimed to have left Sinatra's company to make a film with Furie based on the Sam Sheppard case.

The project eventually became The Lawyer (1970) starring Barry Newman as Petrocelli. He produced two more films for Furie: Little Fauss and Big Halsy (1970) starring Robert Redford, and Lady Sings the Blues (1972) starring Diana Ross as Billie Holiday.

=== Later work ===
Dexter returned to acting with roles in Jory (1973), Shampoo (1975), Vigilante Force (1976), The Private Files of J. Edgar Hoover (1977), House Calls (1978) and Winter Kills (1979), and guest parts on McCloud, Kojak, S.W.A.T., Project U.F.O., and The Incredible Hulk. Dexter produced the TV series Skag (1980) starring Karl Malden. His last role was in Cognac (1988).

== Personal life ==
Dexter married singer Peggy Lee January 1953; the couple divorced that November.

He was married to StarKist tuna heiress Mary Bogdanovich from January 27, 1971, until her death on June 12, 1994. Later in 1994, he married June Deyer and remained with her until his death.

== Death ==
Dexter died in Rancho Mirage, California, from emphysema, on December 11, 2002, at age 85, and is interred at Desert Memorial Park.

== Filmography ==
- Winged Victory (1944) as Jack Browning (uncredited)
- Heldorado (1946) as Alec Baxter
- Sinbad the Sailor (1947) as Muallin
- The Asphalt Jungle (1950) as Bob Brannom
- Fourteen Hours (1951) as Reporter (uncredited)
- The Las Vegas Story (1952) as Tom Hubler
- Macao (1952) as Vincent Halloran
- 99 River Street (1953) as Victor Rawlins
- Untamed (1955) as Lt. Christian
- Violent Saturday (1955) as Gil Clayton
- House of Bamboo (1955) as Captain Hanson
- The Bottom of the Bottle (1956) as Stanley Miller
- Between Heaven and Hell (1956) as Lt. Joe 'Little Joe' Johnson
- The Oklahoman (1957) as Cass Dobie
- Run Silent, Run Deep (1958) as Ens. Gerald Cartwright
- Last Train from Gun Hill (1959) as Beero
- Vice Raid (1960) as Vince Malone
- 13 Fighting Men (1960) as Maj. Simon Boyd
- The Magnificent Seven (1960) as Harry Luck
- Twenty Plus Two (1961) as Leroy Dane
- The George Raft Story (1961) as Benny 'Bugsy' Siegel
- X-15 (1961) as Maj. Anthony Rinaldi
- Taras Bulba (1962) as Shilo
- Johnny Cool (1963) as Lennart Crandall
- Kings of the Sun (1963) as Ah Haleb
- Invitation to a Gunfighter (1964) as Kenarsie
- None but the Brave (1965) as Sgt. Bleeker
- Bus Riley's Back in Town (1965) as Slocum
- Von Ryan's Express (1965) as Sgt. Bostick
- Blindfold (1966) as Detective Harrigan
- Jory (1973) as Jack
- Shampoo (1975) as Senator East
- Vigilante Force (1976) as Mayor Bradford
- The Private Files of J. Edgar Hoover (1977) as Alvin Karpis
- House Calls (1978) as Quinn
- Winter Kills (1979) as Captain Heller One
- Tajna manastirske rakije (1988) as Veljko Pantovich (final role)
