= Heldorado =

1946 film

- Original film poster
- Directed by: William Witney
- Written by: Gerald Geraghty; Julian Zimet
- Produced by: Edward J. White
- Starring: Roy Rogers; Trigger
- Cinematography: William Bradford
- Edited by: Lester Orlebeck
- Music by: R. Dale Butts; Joseph Dubin
- Production company: Republic Pictures
- Distributed by: Republic Pictures
- Release date: December 15, 1946 (United States)
- Running time: 70 minutes 54 minutes
- Country: United States
- Language: English

Heldorado is a 1946 American Western film starring Roy Rogers set during the annual Helldorado Days celebrations in Las Vegas. It was the last teaming of Roy and comedy relief sidekick Gabby Hayes. Hayes shares a scene with Pat Brady who later became Rogers' comedy relief sidekick.

== Plot ==
Roy Rogers is a Captain in the Nevada Rangers who plans to take some well earned leave to go to Helldorado celebrations. His leave is interrupted when the Sheriff of Clark County, Nevada requests his help to investigate money laundering being done by an organized crime syndicate. The Syndicate uses impoverished local playboy Alec Baxter to launder thousand dollar bills at the gaming tables of the casinos of the state.

During this time socialite Carol Randall is elected Queen of the Helldorado Rodeo and is also made a deputy sheriff. When Alec is murdered Carol uses her badge and wiles to investigate Alec's murder that brings her into conflict with Captain Rogers. The Syndicate is awaiting a new shipment of funds to launder and tries to assassinate Roy during the Helldorado treasure hunt.

== Cast ==
- Roy Rogers ... Nevada Ranger Captain Roy Rogers
- Trigger ... Trigger, Roy's Horse
- George 'Gabby' Hayes ... Gabby
- Dale Evans ... Carol Randall
- Paul Harvey ... C.W. Driscoll
- Brad Dexter ... Alec Baxter (billed as Barry Mitchell)
- John Bagni ... Johnny
- John Phillips ... Sheriff
- Malcolm 'Bud' McTaggart ... Bellboy
- Rex Lease ... Charlie the Bartender
- Steve Darrell ... Mitch
- LeRoy Mason ... State Ranger
- Charles Williams ... Carnival Judge
- Eddie Acuff ... Carnival Shooting-Gallery Attendant
- Pat Brady .... Himself
- Bob Nolan and the Sons of the Pioneers

== Songs ==
- Heldorado

Written by Jack Elliott
Performed by Roy Rogers and the Sons of the Pioneers

- Good Neighbor

Written by Jack Elliott
Performed by Roy Rogers and Dale Evans

- My Saddle Pals and I

Written by Roy Rogers
Performed by Roy Rogers and the Sons of the Pioneers

- Silver Stars, Purple Sage, Eyes of Blue

Written by Denver Darling
Performed by Roy Rogers

- You Ain't Heard Nothin' Till You Hear Him Roar

Written by Bob Nolan
Performed by Pat Brady and the Sons of the Pioneers

== Quotes ==
Don't put on that badge until Halloween - Roy to Deputy Sheriff Carol
(after releasing Carol imprisoned inside a refrigerator) Does the light go out inside? - Roy

== See also ==
- List of films set in Las Vegas
