= The Oklahoman (film) =

1957 film by Francis D. Lyon

- Directed by: Francis D. Lyon
- Written by: Daniel B. Ullman
- Produced by: Walter Mirisch
- Starring: Joel McCrea; Barbara Hale; Brad Dexter
- Cinematography: Carl E. Guthrie
- Edited by: George White
- Music by: Hans J. Salter
- Color process: Color by DeLuxe
- Production company: Allied Artists Pictures
- Distributed by: Allied Artists Pictures
- Release date: May 19, 1957
- Running time: 80 minutes
- Country: United States
- Language: English

The Oklahoman is a 1957 American CinemaScope Western film starring Joel McCrea, Barbara Hale, and Brad Dexter. It was also the last film of actress Esther Dale.

== Plot ==
On his way to California, a doctor, John Brighton, decides to stay in Oklahoma Territory after his wife dies in childbirth. He takes a room at the home of elderly Mrs. Fitzgerald, who helps raise his new daughter Louise.

Five years later, as he becomes acquainted with attractive widow Anne Barnes and her mother, Mrs. Waynebrook, the doctor treats the ill child of an Indian named Charlie. He also meets Charlie's teen daughter, Maria, who is so good with children that he puts Louise in her care after Mrs. Fitzgerald's death.

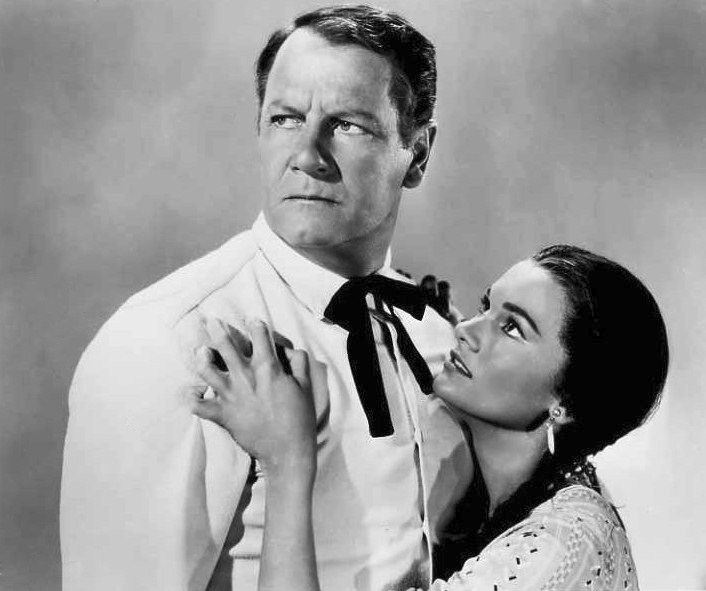
Publicity photograph of Joel McCrea and Gloria Talbott for the film

Wealthy rancher Cass Dobie and brother Mel are gobbling up land in the territory. When they determine that oil is on Charlie's property, they scheme to get it. Mel even tries to shoot Charlie, but is killed in self-defense. John testifies on Charlie's behalf.

While awaiting a legal decision on the shooting, Maria professes her love for John. The angry Cass has a confrontation with John, who prevails, after which Maria realizes that John is actually in love with Anne.

== Cast ==
- Joel McCrea as John Brighton
- Barbara Hale as Anne Barnes
- Brad Dexter as Cass Dobie
- Verna Felton as Mrs. Waynebrook
- Douglas Dick as Mel Dobie
- Michael Pate as Charlie
- Gloria Talbott as Maria
- Esther Dale as Mrs. Fitzgerald
- Ray Teal as Jason
- Scotty Beckett as Messenger at Ranch (uncredited)
- Mimi Gibson as Louise Brighton

== Comic book adaptation ==
- Dell Four Color #820 (June 1957)
