= List of The Hardy Boys/Nancy Drew Mysteries episodes =

TV series Episodes

This is a list of episodes for The Hardy Boys/Nancy Drew Mysteries, a television series which aired for three seasons on ABC.

== Series overview ==
Season	Episodes	First aired	Last aired	Rank	Nielsen ratings
1	14	January 30, 1977	May 22, 1977	#61	17.2
2	22	September 11, 1977	May 7, 1978	#69	15.8
3	10	October 1, 1978	January 14, 1979	#92	13.0

== Episodes ==
=== Season 1 (1977) ===
Season 1 featured 7 Hardy Boys episodes, and 7 Nancy Drew episodes. There were no crossover episodes during this season.

No. overall	No. in season	Title	Directed by	Written by	Original release date
1	1	"The Mystery of the Haunted House"	Glen A. Larson	Glen A. Larson	January 30, 1977
Joe and Frank Hardy, suspicious of their father's "fishing trip", follow him and become involved in the search for an amnesiac ex-soldier being chased by killers for some secret he knows. They end up at a club called the Haunted House that has mazes, trapdoors, and secret passageways. First appearance of Shaun Cassidy and Parker Stevenson as The Hardy Boys.
2	2	"The Mystery of Pirate's Cove"	E.W. Swackhamer	Glen A. Larson	February 6, 1977
Nancy Drew and her friends see a beam of light coming from a supposedly abandoned lighthouse, and a professor tries to convince her that it is haunted. The local sheriff thinks they're imagining things, so it's up to Nancy to solve the mystery. First appearance of Pamela Sue Martin as Nancy Drew.
3	3	"The Mystery of Witches' Hollow"	Ron Satlof	Michael Sloan	February 13, 1977
Frank and Joe Hardy try to visit Captain Maguire, the uncle of their father's assistant Callie, but discover that he disappeared in a mysterious wooded place called Witches' Hollow. Their only clues are a mute's sketches.
4	4	"The Mystery of the Diamond Triangle"	Noel Black	Robert Pirosh	February 20, 1977
Nancy Drew and her friend, George, see an automobile run off the road, but the sheriff tells her that the road has long been closed and there is no trace of the accident.
5	5	"The Disappearing Floor"	Fernando Lamas	Larry Alexander	March 6, 1977
The Hardy Boys, while doing some legwork on a case of their father's involving a missing Russian scientist, see a UFO that leads them to a mysterious mansion full of illusions, where floors disappear and rooms change size.
6	6	"The Secret of the Whispering Walls"	Michael Caffey	Story by : Keith Walker; Teleplay by : Keith Walker & Glen A. Larson	March 13, 1977
A burglary at her home leads Nancy Drew to investigate her aunts' attempt to sell their farm, which someone is apparently trying to make them believe is haunted.
7	7	"The Flickering Torch Mystery"	Ivan Dixon	James Henerson	March 27, 1977
While assisting in a missing persons investigation for their father, the Hardy boys believe they have discovered a murder plot against a famous rock musician, but no one believes them.
8	8	"A Haunting We Will Go"	Jack Arnold	Story by : Larry Alexander, Glen A. Larson, & Michael Sloan; Teleplay by : Glen A. Larson & Michael Sloan	April 3, 1977
When Nancy Drew and her friends revive a 20-year-old play to raise money for a youth center, they are astounded when five members of the original cast return to perform in it, especially when the theatre is supposed to be haunted.
9	9	"The Mystery of the Flying Courier"	Michael Caffey	Gregory S. Dinallo	April 10, 1977
The Hardy Boys investigate a crooked disc jockey and a case of record piracy. Joe Hardy makes his singing debut at a disco where Frank recognizes a girl who has been missing for three years but denies her identity when confronted.
10	10	"The Mystery of the Fallen Angels"	Noel Black	Lou Shaw	April 17, 1977
Nancy and her friends are at a benefit performance at a carnival when they witness a jewel robbery. Suspecting a gang of bikers, Nancy goes undercover as a runaway who wants to join the carnival.
11	11	"Wipe Out"	Steven H. Stern	B.W. Sandefur	April 24, 1977
While the Hardy Boys are in Hawaii for a surfing contest, their hotel room is robbed. Discovering that they're not the only victims, the two detectives volunteer to help the Hawaiian police apprehend the burglars.
12	12	"The Mystery of the Ghostwriters' Cruise"	Alvin Ganzer	Story by : Susan Woollen; Teleplay by : Michael Sloan	May 1, 1977
Taking a luxurious ocean cruise, Nancy and her friends go into action when a famous mystery writer on board receives death threats that follow one of his own plots.
13	13	"The Secret of the Jade Kwan Yin"	Stuart Margolin	Robert Pirosh	May 15, 1977
The Hardy Boys discover a box at the beach that contains a priceless jade statue. This plunges them into a case involving smugglers and an extortion plot against a community of Chinese-Americans.
14	14	"The Mystery of the Solid Gold Kicker"	Andy Sidaris	Lou Shaw	May 22, 1977
Nancy Drew and her girlfriend attend a college victory party where they find a football star standing over a dead girl with the murder weapon in his hand.

=== Season 2 (1977–78) ===
Season 2 featured 11 Hardy Boys episodes, 3 Nancy Drew episodes and 8 crossover episodes in which all three characters appeared. All three solo Nancy Drew episodes featured Pamela Sue Martin, as did four of the crossover episodes. The remaining four crossover episodes, all airing towards the end of the season, featured Janet Louise Johnson as Nancy Drew.

No. overall	No. in season	Title	Directed by	Written by	Original release date
15	1	"The Hardy Boys and Nancy Drew Meet Dracula: Part 1"	Joseph Pevney	Michael Sloan & Glen A. Larson	September 11, 1977
Frank and Joe go to Transylvania to find their father, who disappeared while investigating a series of European art thefts. They encounter Nancy Drew and Bess at a festival called Dracula's Castle, and end up joining forces.
16	2	"The Hardy Boys and Nancy Drew Meet Dracula: Part 2"	Joseph Pevney	Michael Sloan & Glen A. Larson	September 18, 1977
The Hardy Boys and Nancy Drew meet a group of musicians (led by songwriter Bernie Taupin in his acting debut) and Joe talks them into playing a gig at the Dracula's Castle festival, with Joe as one of the singers, so they can get in to search for their father.
17	3	"The Mystery of King Tut's Tomb"	John J. Dumas	Robert C. Dennis	September 25, 1977
In Egypt, the Hardy Boys investigate after a young woman denies that the handbag Frank recovered is hers, and he is left holding a golden idol stolen from one of the pyramids.
18	4	"The Mystery of the Hollywood Phantom: Part 1"	Steven H. Stern	Michael Sloan	October 2, 1977
When the attendees at a detectives convention start disappearing during a Hollywood film studio tour, the Hardy Boys and Nancy Drew again join forces to investigate.
19	5	"The Mystery of the Hollywood Phantom: Part 2"	Steven H. Stern	Michael Sloan	October 9, 1977
Frank tries to solve the mystery why three of the top detectives at the show, including the Hardys' dad, are kidnapped for ransom. Meanwhile Nancy searches for Joe after learning that he has been kidnapped by the mysterious Phantom.
20	6	"The Mystery of the African Safari"	Joseph Pevney	Cliff Osmond	October 16, 1977
Frank and Joe Hardy accompany their father to Kenya to investigate a huge poaching operation on a game preserve.
21	7	"The Creatures Who Came on Sunday"	Winrich Kolbe	David H. Balkin	October 30, 1977
In Nevada, the Hardy Boys try to help a girl whose boyfriend appears to have been abducted by aliens.
22	8	"The Strange Fate of Flight 608"	Ron Satlof	Christopher Crowe	November 6, 1977
After the pilots are mysteriously knocked out, Frank and Joe Hardy crash land a commercial airplane full of gorgeous stewardesses on a deserted island in the Bermuda Triangle after a major tropical storm.
23	9	"Acapulco Spies"	Keith Atkinson	Michael Sloan	November 13, 1977
Summoned to Mexico to deliver an important file to their father, Frank and Joe Hardy get their dad into more trouble by delivering it to two American girls by mistake.
24	10	"Nancy Drew's Love Match"	Joseph Pevney	Story by : John Ireland, Jr. & Glen A. Larson; Teleplay by : John Ireland, Jr.	November 20, 1977
Nancy goes undercover at an exclusive tennis tournament to keep a kleptomaniac classmate out of trouble during a crucial match, although Nancy and her best friend George don't mind the handsome tennis pro.
25	11	"The Mystery of the Silent Scream"	John J. Dumas	Story by : Alan Godfrey & Michael Sloan; Teleplay by : Alan Godfrey	November 27, 1977
Frank and Joe Hardy try to track down a deaf girl who is in danger because she accidentally found out about a terrorist's bomb plot by reading the man's lips.
26	12	"Will the Real Santa Claus...?"	Michael Pataki	Michael Sloan	December 18, 1977
Nancy Drew is determined to prove the innocence of an elderly derelict who believes he is Santa but has been jailed for a series of burglaries.
27	13	"The Lady on Thursday at Ten"	Joseph Pevney	Christopher Crowe	January 1, 1978
In New York City, Nancy Drew and a former champion boxer try to expose a plot to assassinate the visiting British Foreign Secretary. Final appearance of Pamela Sue Martin as Nancy Drew, and also Nancy's final "solo" episode (all Nancy's future appearances were in team-ups with the Hardy Boys).
28	14	"Oh Say Can You Sing"	Dennis Donnelly	Chris Conkling	January 8, 1978
On the Fourth of July, the Hardy Boys stop in a small town to help their friend Harriett with a concert, but they become suspicious when she acts strangely and then gets arrested for a hit-and-run accident.
29	15	"The House on Possessed Hill"	Daniel Haller	Michael Sloan	January 22, 1978
Joe Hardy tries to help a young woman with psychic powers who is mysteriously drawn to a spooky old house. Note: This episode shares elements with the book, The House on the Cliff.
30	16	"Sole Survivor"	Christian I. Nyby II	Christopher Crowe	January 29, 1978
Joe Hardy awakes from a coma to find that he's been out of it for a year, and his brother Frank and his father Fenton died eleven months ago, but soon discovers that not everything is as it seems.
31	17	"Voodoo Doll: Part 1"	Joseph Pevney	Story by : Mark Griffiths & Stephen Ujlaki; Teleplay by : Christopher Crowe & Michael Sloan and Mark Griffiths & Stephen Ujlaki	February 12, 1978
In New Orleans for Mardi Gras, Frank and Joe Hardy have their wallets stolen. They get unexpected assistance from Nancy Drew, who is working undercover there as a magician. First appearance of Janet Louise Johnson as Nancy Drew.
32	18	"Voodoo Doll: Part 2"	Joseph Pevney	Story by : Mark Griffiths & Stephen Ujlaki; Teleplay by : Christopher Crowe & Michael Sloan and Mark Griffiths & Stephen Ujlaki	February 19, 1978
Finding voodoo dolls in their hotel room, dead men and coffins are only a few of the Hardy Boys' problems.
33	19	"Mystery on the Avalanche Express"	Christian I. Nyby II	Story by : Susan Woollen; Teleplay by : Michael Sloan	February 26, 1978
On board a ski train to Austria, a frightened girl fleeing from thugs gets the Hardy Boys and Nancy Drew into hot water when she switches bags with Nancy.
34	20	"Death Surf"	Ray Danton; Jack Arnold	Story by : Joyce Brotman & Arlene Sidaris; Teleplay by : Robert Earll	March 12, 1978
While windsurfing in Hawaii, Frank Hardy tries to rescue a girl who disappears and is claimed to be dead. He then becomes obsessed with finding out what happened to her, but someone else is watching him, who is also on her trail.
35	21	"Arson and Old Lace"	Christian I. Nyby II	Michael Sloan & Christopher Crowe	April 2, 1978
Frank and Joe Hardy try to find out what has happened to Nancy Drew, who is being held captive by a reclusive former movie star, while a deranged girl plans to set fire to the building. Final appearance of Janet Louise Johnson as Nancy Drew.
36	22	"Campus Terror"	Jack Arnold	Story by : Mark Griffiths & Stephen Ujlaki; Teleplay by : Christopher Crowe & Michael Sloan and Mark Griffiths & Stephen Ujlaki	May 7, 1978
The Hardys head east to New England when an old girlfriend of Joe's calls, saying that some classmates of hers have gone missing at Eastlake University.

=== Season 3 (1978–79) ===
The series is retitled The Hardy Boys for this season. All 10 episodes feature the Hardy Boys only, as the character of Nancy Drew is dropped.

No. overall	No. in season	Title	Directed by	Written by	Original release date
37	1	"The Last Kiss of Summer: Part 1"	Vince Edwards	Story by : Rebecca Snow; Teleplay by : Glen A. Larson & Michael Sloan	October 1, 1978
After Joe Hardy's fiancée is killed by a hit-and-run driver, the FBI won't let the police arrest the man until their own case against him is finished. Joe takes the law into his own hands and goes undercover as a rich gambler with underworld connections.
38	2	"The Last Kiss of Summer: Part 2"	Vince Edwards	Story by : Rebecca Snow; Teleplay by : Glen A. Larson & Michael Sloan	October 8, 1978
Joe Hardy is still haunted by memories of his dead fiancee, but has to focus his mind on the case when Jocco's girlfriend overhears him talking to the police on the phone. Meanwhile, Frank Hardy tries to help Joe by going undercover too, but Jocco finds out and traps Frank in a shark-infested area.
39	3	"Assault on the Tower"	Winrich Kolbe	Christopher Crowe & Michael Sloan	October 15, 1978
Patrick Macnee guest stars in this unofficial crossover with The Avengers. Joe and Frank Hardy go to London to find their missing father, but when Frank goes missing as well, Joe and an agent from the British Ministry must find a traitor together.
40	4	"Search for Atlantis"	Don McDougall; Edward M. Abroms	Steven E. de Souza	October 22, 1978
In Greece to investigate drug smuggling, the Hardy Boys pose as archeology students on a dig for the lost city of Atlantis, but they are dogged by suspicious accidents and a dead body.
41	5	"Dangerous Waters"	Richard Benedict	Lee Sheldon	October 29, 1978
Frank and Joe Hardy journey from the South of France to the Caribbean to find a girl who disappeared while hunting for pirate treasure.
42	6	"Scorpion's Sting"	Dennis Donnelly	Christopher Crowe & Michael Sloan	November 5, 1978
Frank and Joe Hardy are assigned to go to Puerto Rico to protect a senator's daughter from an international blackmailer known as the Scorpion.
43	7	"Defection to Paradise: Part 1"	Ray Austin	Glen A. Larson & Michael Sloan	November 19, 1978
When the daughter of a Russian official defects to the U.S. by hiding in one of the rock band Bread's speaker cabinets sent to Hawaii, the Hardy Boys must track her down before the KGB does.
44	8	"Defection to Paradise: Part 2"	Ray Austin	Glen A. Larson & Michael Sloan	November 26, 1978
Marla falls for an American agent, but Soviet killers pursue her.
45	9	"Game Plan"	Keith Daughtry	Steven E. de Souza	December 3, 1978
A woman executes a securities scam from Atlantic City casinos using a code that the Hardy Boys must break.
46	10	"Life on the Line"	Sidney Hayers	Story by : Joyce Brotman & Arlene Sidaris; Teleplay by : Gil Grant	January 14, 1979
Joe and Frank are assigned to protect a motocross racer, the daughter of a mob informant who has been threatened by assassins, but a strange woman has become obsessed with Frank. Final appearance of Shaun Cassidy and Parker Stevenson as the Hardy Boys.
