= Emmi Pikler =

Hungarian pediatrician

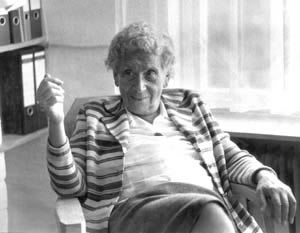
- Born: Emilie Madleine Reich; January 9, 1902; Vienna, Austria
- Died: June 6, 1984 (aged 82); Budapest, Hungary
- Citizenship: Hungarian
- Known for: Pediatrician and infant educator

Emmi Pikler (born Emilie Madleine Reich; January 9, 1902 – June 6, 1984) was a Hungarian pediatrician who introduced new theories of infant education, and put them into practice at an orphanage she ran.

== Life ==
Emmi Pikler was born in 1902 and spent her early childhood in Vienna. She was the only child of a Viennese kindergarten teacher and a Hungarian craftsman. In 1908 her parents moved to Budapest. When Pikler was 12 years old, her mother died.

Pikler returned to Vienna to study Medicine, and received her medical degree in 1927. Her pediatric training was at the Vienna University Children's Hospital by Clemens von Pirquet and Pikler studied pediatric surgery under Hans Salzer.

Pikler's husband was a mathematician and educator whose experiences aligned with her own perspective on developmental physiology. They decided together with the birth of their first child to allow the child freedom of movement and to await her development patiently, with the goal of promoting her healthy development. Pikler’s experience with her daughter helped build her perspective that a child must not be stimulated to movement and to games and that every detail in dealing with a child and their environment is important.

At first the family lived in Trieste, and later in Budapest.

In 1935, Pikler qualified as a pediatrician in Hungary. Pikler wrote and gave lectures about the care and upbringing of infants and young children. She published her first book for parents in 1940 and it went through several editions in Hungary and other countries.

The ten years that she worked as a family doctor were difficult. Pikler’s family was Jewish and her husband was imprisoned for political reasons from 1936 to 1945. With the help of the parents of the children she cared for, Pikler and her family survived the persecution of Jews during World War II.

After the war she gave birth to two more children. She did not open her private practice again, but worked for a national association for abandoned and malnourished children. In addition to other activities, she founded the Lóczy orphanage (named after the street where it was located) in 1946, which she headed until 1979. She sought to establish a comforting atmosphere, including careful selection of the staff, to allow children at the orphanage to grow up without the usual institutional damage.

Elsa Gindler and Heinrich Jacoby found in the 1920s that it was essential to understand the natural path of child development in order to allow the child's initial skills and powers to develop. Gindler and Jacoby explained that traditional infant and early childhood education damaged the initiative of children and stunted their development.

In 1946, Pikler founded the Lóczy Institute in Budapest. Under her leadership, and by the publication of books and scientific publications, an internationally known institution developed that later has been managed by Pikler's daughter, child psychologist Anna Tardos. After Pikler retired in 1978, she continued her scientific and consultative work in Lóczy. Pikler died in 1984 after a short but severe illness.

Pikler's methods of raising infants and young children have been popularized in the United States by her student Magda Gerber.

== Books ==
- Laßt mir Zeit. Die selbständige Bewegungsentwicklung des Kindes bis zum freien Gehen. Untersuchungsergebnisse, Aufsätze und Vorträge. (Give me time. The independent movement of the child's development to go free. Findings, articles and lectures.) (with Anna Tardos). Pflaum, München 2001 / 3. Reprint ISBN 3-7905-0842-X
- Friedliche Babys - zufriedene Mütter. Pädagogische Ratschläge einer Kinderärztin. (Peaceful baby - happy mothers. Pedagogical advice of a pediatrician.) Herder, Freiburg 2008/9. Reprint ISBN 978-3-451-04986-6

== Bibliography ==
- Myriam David, Geneviéve Appell : Lóczy ou le Maternage Insolite Paris, Editions du Scarabée, 1973
- Emmi Pikler : Se mouvoir en liberté dès le premier âge, Paris, P.U.F, 1979
- Bernard Martino : Les Enfants de la colline des roses : Lóczy, une maison pour grandir, Lattès, 2001
- Agnès Szanto-Féder (sous la direction de) : Loczy: un nouveau paradigme ? Paris, P.U.F, 2002
