= Magda Gerber =

Early childhood educator (1910–2007)

Magda Gerber (November 1, 1910 – April 27, 2007) was an early childhood educator in the United States and is known for teaching parents and caregivers how to understand babies and interact with them respectfully from birth.

The seeds for her passion for infant care came from pediatrician Emmi Pikler. Pikler's innovative theories on infant care were successfully tested during the course of her tenure as medical director of Loczy, a state-run orphanage in Budapest. Gerber incorporated many of Pikler's theories into her own philosophy, which she called Educaring. The term Educarer, which she also coined, refers to either a parent or other caregiver, and emphasizes the bidirectional influence of caring and educating.

== Biography ==
Gerber was born in Budapest, Hungary. She received a degree in linguistics at the Sorbonne in Paris. She and her husband Imre Gerber had three children.

Magda met Pikler in her role as a pediatrician for the local families of Budapest. When her daughter was sick, and their regular pediatrician was away, Gerber called the mother of her daughter's school friend, who was a doctor. Pikler examined her daughter, and Gerber was so impressed by how respectfully Pikler spoke to her daughter, and the cooperation that she elicited, that she asked Pikler to become the family's regular pediatrician.

Inspired by Pikler, Gerber earned a Master's degree in early childhood education in Budapest and in 1945 she began working with Pikler at the National Methodological Institute for Infant Care and Education in Budapest, commonly called Lóczy after the street on which it was located. Pikler became Gerber's mentor and friend.

Shortly after the end of WWII, the Communist Party takeover threw Hungary into political turmoil. Gerber's husband and teenage daughter were jailed as political prisoners. After the 1956 Hungarian Revolution, the family left Hungary to seek sanctuary in Austria. Gerber worked as an interpreter at the American Embassy in Vienna until 1957 when the family emigrated to the United States.

They were placed at Camp Kilmer, a military base in New Jersey, before moving to Boston for a year where Gerber again worked as an interpreter at Harvard University. The family then settled in Los Angeles where Gerber worked as a therapist at Children's Hospital with children who had cerebral palsy. Gerber then spent seven years working with autistic children at the Dubnoff School, in North Hollywood, California. According to her book, "Your Self-confident Baby", Gerber was able to develop relationships with extremely disturbed children that nobody else had been able to reach. She claimed that her magic was closely observing the children and expecting only what they could do. "When a child is expected to do something he cannot, he is set up for failure."

In 1968, she developed and directed the Pilot Infant Program at the Dubnoff School.

In 1972, Gerber was invited by Thomas Forrest, pediatric neurologist and clinical assistant professor of pediatrics at Stanford University, to advise him on the program he was starting for the Children's Health Council (CHC) in Palo Alto, California. Gerber co-directed the Demonstration Infant Program (DIP) with Forrest for four years. The DIP was a program of preventative mental health based on modeling selective intervention with a group of infants and toddlers to their parents or carers. The program encouraged children to learn problem solving skills through play and foster self-confidence. Gerber described the purpose of the program "If you can help parents to perceive and accept the child at his own developmental level, and to learn how to understand and respond to his needs, you can prevent problems before they develop, rather than have the difficult job of undoing them later in life."

In 1973 she began teaching parent/infant guidance classes in Los Angeles.

In 1978, Gerber and Forrest co-founded the non-profit organisation Resources for Infant Educarers (RIE) in Los Angeles to further their work with families and child care professionals. At RIE (pronounced 'rye'), Gerber taught parents to observe their babies as they played, while a facilitator modelled how and when to intervene.

Gerber taught parents to think about guiding children's behaviour through the lens of a stoplight. When a child can handle the situation, the light is green and the adult does not need to intervene. If the child's behaviour will put themselves or another person in danger, or is socially inappropriate, (a red light situation) then the adult will intervene to prevent anyone from getting hurt or to explain why something is not okay. This is done in a calm, non-judgmental way. It might also include physically blocking the child from causing harm. When there is a situation where the child may not be able to manage on their own, the adult can respond to this as an amber light situation. The adult would come close to observe the situation, and be ready to act.

Gerber taught early childhood development classes at the University of California, Los Angeles; California State University, Northridge and Pacific Oaks College, Pasadena. She taught professional training classes and RIE parent/infant guidance classes at the RIE centre in Los Angeles.

== The RIE approach ==
RIE's mission is to improve the lives of infants and young children through respectful care. Gerber believed that babies are whole, competent beings from birth and should be treated as such. Gerber states in her book "Dear Parent: Caring for infants with respect" that, "We not only respect babies, we demonstrate our respect every time we interact with them. Respecting a child means treating even the youngest infant as a unique human being, not as an object."

The basic principles of the RIE approach are:

- Basic trust in the child to be an initiator, an explorer, and a self-learner.
- An environment for the child that is physically safe, cognitively challenging and emotionally nurturing.
- Time for uninterrupted play.
- Freedom to explore and interact with other infants.
- Involvement of the child in all care-giving activities to allow the child to be an active participant rather than a passive recipient.
- Sensitive observation of the child in order to understand her needs.
- Consistency and clearly defined limits and expectations to develop discipline.

RIE continues to offer classes for parents and their infants and toddlers, as well as a certificate program for parents and professionals in the Educaring Approach. The Approach has now found its way around the world, with certified RIE Associates™ teaching and practicing in Europe, Asia, Australia, New Zealand, and Central America, uniting many cultures in their appreciation of the rights and integrity of infants and young children.

Gerber's work has been included in professional journals and videos, and her training tools are used to educate infant teachers and Early Head Start teachers in the US. Mooney states that Gerber "did much to set the tone for quality infant care and parenting programs in the US and around the world".

== Published works ==
Gerber edited "The RIE Manual for Parents and Professionals" which was first published in 1978 and continues to be used and expanded in 2012 with more of her work. In 1997 she wrote Your Self-Confident Baby: How to Encourage Your Child's Natural Abilities from the Very Start with Allison Johnson, and in 1998 she wrote Dear Parent: Caring for Infants With Respect (with Joan Weaver) (Resources for Infant Educarers 1998, 2003).

== See also ==
- Resources for Infant Educarers
- Emmi Pikler
