= Jump Street =

American multimedia franchise that commenced in 1987

- Created by: Patrick Hasburgh; Stephen J. Cannell
- Original work: 21 Jump Street (1987–1991)
- Owners: Stephen J. Cannell Productions; Films: Sony Pictures Entertainment; Amazon MGM Studios

Films and television
- Films: 21 Jump Street (2012); 22 Jump Street (2014)
- Television series: 21 Jump Street (1987–1991); Booker (1989–1990)

Audio
- Soundtrack: 22 Jump Street (2014)

Jump Street is an American multimedia franchise that began in 1987. The franchise concerns the lives of the Jump Street program, an undercover police unit in which young-looking detectives infiltrate schools and similar settings attended by minors to investigate crimes.

== Television series ==
=== 21 Jump Street (1987–1991) ===
21 Jump Street is an American police procedural crime drama television series that aired on Fox with a total of 103 episodes.

=== Booker (1989–1990) ===
Booker is an American crime drama series starring Richard Grieco that aired on Fox. The series is a spin-off of 21 Jump Street and the second installment of the 21 Jump Street franchise.

== Films ==
=== 24 Jump Street (2027) ===
On June 24, 2024, Tatum stated that 23 Jump Street had "the best script I've ever read for a third movie," and that he "would love to do it with Jonah, and Jonah I know wants to do it."

On June 10, 2026, Variety announces that the third film, 24 Jump Street was in development, skipping "23" from the title with Hill, Tatum and Ice Cube returning.

Film	U.S. release date	Director(s)	Screenwriter(s)	Story by	Producers
21 Jump Street	March 16, 2012	Phil Lord & Christopher Miller	Michael Bacall	Jonah Hill & Michael Bacall	Neal H. Moritz & Stephen J. Cannell
22 Jump Street	June 13, 2014	Phil Lord & Christopher Miller	Oren Uziel, Rodney Rothman & Michael Bacall	Jonah Hill & Michael Bacall	Jonah Hill, Neal H. Moritz & Channing Tatum
24 Jump Street	December 10, 2027	Rodney Rothman	Jonah Hill, Meghan Malloy & Rodney Rothman		Reid Carolin, Matt Dines, Jonah Hill, Phil Lord, Christopher Miller, Neal H. Moritz & Channing Tatum

== Cast and characters ==
List indicators

This section includes characters who will appear or have appeared in the franchise.

- An empty grey cell indicates the character was not in the film, or that the character's official presence has not yet been confirmed.
- ^{C} indicates a cameo role.

Character	Television series						Films	
Character	21 Jump Street					Booker	21 Jump Street	22 Jump Street
Character	1	2	3	4	5	Booker	21 Jump Street	22 Jump Street
Character	1987	1987–88	1988–89	1989–90	1990–91	1989–90	2012	2014
Judith "Judy" Hoffs	Holly Robinson Peete	Holly Robinson Peete	Holly Robinson Peete	Holly Robinson Peete	Holly Robinson Peete	Holly Robinson Peete	Holly Robinson Peete^{C}	
Thomas "Tom" Hanson	Johnny Depp	Johnny Depp	Johnny Depp	Johnny Depp			Johnny Depp^{C}	
Douglas "Doug" Penhall	Peter John DeLuise	Peter John DeLuise	Peter John DeLuise	Peter John DeLuise	Peter John DeLuise	Peter John DeLuise	Peter John DeLuise^{C}	
Adam Fuller	Steven Williams	Steven Williams	Steven Williams	Steven Williams	Steven Williams	Steven Williams		
Harry Truman "H.T." Ioki Vinh Van Tran	Dustin Nguyen	Dustin Nguyen	Dustin Nguyen	Dustin Nguyen			Dustin Nguyen^{C}	Dustin Nguyen^{C}
Sal "Blowfish" Banducci	Sal Jenco	Sal Jenco	Sal Jenco	Sal Jenco				
Dennis Booker		Richard Grieco	Richard Grieco	Richard Grieco		Richard Grieco		Richard Grieco^{C}
Jackie Garrett		Yvette Nipar	Yvette Nipar					
Dean Garrett			David Barry Gray	David Barry Gray				
Kati Rocky			Alexandra Powers	Alexandra Powers				
Joseph "Joey" Penhall					Michael DeLuise			
Anthony "Mac" McCann					Michael Bendetti			
Raymond Crane				Ray Baker		Ray Baker		
Morton Schmidt Doug McQuaid							Jonah Hill	Jonah Hill Seth Rogen^{C}
Greg Jenko Brad McQuaid							Channing Tatum	Channing Tatum
Captain Dickson							Ice Cube	Ice Cube
Mr. Walters							Rob Riggle	Rob Riggle
Eric Molson							Dave Franco	Dave Franco
Deputy Chief Hardy							Nick Offerman	Nick Offerman

== Reception ==
=== Box office performance ===
Film	Release date	Box office gross				Box office ranking		Budget	Ref.
Film	Release date	Opening weekend North America	North America	Other territories	Worldwide	All time North America	All time worldwide	Budget	Ref.
21 Jump Street	March 16, 2012	$36,302,612	$138,447,667	$63,137,661	$201,585,328	#326	#593	$42 million	
22 Jump Street	June 13, 2014	$57,071,445	$191,719,337	$139,614,539	$331,333,876	#165	#290	$50 million	
Total			$330,167,004	$202,752,200	$532,919,204			$92 million	

=== Critical and public response ===
Film	Rotten Tomatoes	Metacritic	CinemaScore
21 Jump Street	85% (229 reviews)	69 (41 reviews)	B
22 Jump Street	84% (223 reviews)	71 (46 reviews)	A−

== Cancelled projects ==
=== MIB 23 ===
In September 2014, a third Jump Street film was announced to be in development. Channing Tatum has yet to sign on to the project, citing his apprehensions being due to not "know[ing] if that joke works three times". By August 2015, it was revealed that Lord and Miller signed onto the project as writers and producers. A first draft of the film's script has been completed, that incorporates the various sequel stories teased during the end-credits of 22 Jump Street.

In December 2014, it was revealed that the film would be a crossover between the studio's Men in Black and Jump Street film series. The news was leaked after Sony's system was hacked and then confirmed by the directors of the films, Chris Miller and Phil Lord, during an interview about it. James Bobin signed on as director in January 2016. The title of the crossover was later revealed to be MIB 23. By August 2016, Jonah Hill stated that MIB 23 would be hard to make, as "They’re trying to make all the deals, but it’s kind of impossible with all the Men in Black stuff", and "it’s hard to maintain that joke when it’s so high stakes" given the film would get too close to the sort of remake, sequel and reboot the previous films mocked, though expressed hope at the film being made. In December 2016, it was revealed that Rodney Rothman had written the script for the film, with Bobin still contractually attached as director for the movie, and that the film has been scheduled for a 2021 release; however, by January 2019 Lord stated that although the project is still actively being developed, 24 Jump Street would be produced first, noting that all creatives involved are "reserving" MIB 23 for a later date.

=== Jump Street: Now for Her Pleasure ===
In early 2015, a female-driven 21 Jump Street film was rumored to also be in the works. In December 2016, Rodney Rothman was confirmed to write and direct the film. In December 2018, Tiffany Haddish was confirmed to lead the film and Awkwafina is in talks. This idea has also yet to come to fruition.
