= List of 21 Jump Street episodes =

21 Jump Street is an American police procedural crime drama television series that aired on the Fox Network and in first run syndication from April 12, 1987, to April 27, 1991, with a total of 103 episodes spanning five seasons. The series focuses on a squad of youthful-looking undercover police officers investigating crimes in high schools, colleges, and other teenage venues.

== Series overview ==
Season	Episodes	Originally released		
Season	Episodes	First released	Last released	Network
1	13	April 12, 1987	June 28, 1987	Fox
2	22	September 20, 1987	May 22, 1988	Fox
3	20	November 6, 1988	May 21, 1989	Fox
4	26	September 18, 1989	July 16, 1990	Fox
5	22	October 13, 1990	April 27, 1991	Syndicated

== Episodes ==
=== Season 1 (1987) ===
No. overall	No. in season	Title	Directed by	Written by	Original release date	Prod. code	Rating/share (households)
1	1	"Jump Street Chapel" "Pilot"	Kim Manners	Patrick Hasburgh	April 12, 1987	16000	5.2/9
2	2	"Jump Street Chapel" "Pilot"	Kim Manners	Patrick Hasburgh	April 12, 1987	16000	5.2/9
In this two-part pilot, 21-year-old rookie police officer Tom Hanson runs into trouble on the job because he looks much younger than he actually is. He is offered a chance to work with a small group of other young-looking cops who go undercover in local high schools posing as students. Hanson's first undercover assignment with the 21 Jump Street program is to get close to a high school student who owes money to a violent drug dealer.
3	3	"America, What a Town"	Larry Shaw	Bill Nuss	April 19, 1987	16109	N/A
Hoffs is assigned to look after a Polish exchange student who comes to town and begins to act out, partly due to her repressive upbringing in her native country and partly due to stereotypes about American high schools perpetuated through TV. Hanson goes undercover at a high school mechanic shop to investigate a car theft ring. Guest stars: Billy Jayne, Steve Antin, Traci Lind
4	4	"Don't Pet the Teacher"	Les Sheldon	Clifton Campbell	April 26, 1987	16104	N/A
Hanson goes undercover to investigate a series of burglaries at a local high school and learns that both the burglar and a student are obsessed with one of the teachers who works there, Miss Chadwick. Guest star: Leah Ayres
5	5	"My Future's So Bright, I Gotta Wear Shades"	Gary Winter	Bill Nuss	May 3, 1987	16105	N/A
The entire Jump Street gang investigates the rape and murder of a 16-year-old girl by going undercover in a private school, where much of the student body are kids from affluent families. Guest stars: Mitchell Anderson, Josh Brolin
6	6	"The Worst Night of Your Life"	Rob Bowman	Patrick Hasburgh	May 10, 1987	16104	N/A
Officer Hoffs is sent to a Catholic school for girls to investigate a possible arsonist with all leads pointing to a very unlikely suspect. Meanwhile, Penhall is mugged by his date at a bowling alley. Note: Final appearance of Frederic Forrest (Captain Richard Jenko).
7	7	"Gotta Finish the Riff"	Kim Manners	Patrick Hasburgh & Bill Nuss	May 17, 1987	16112	N/A
While still mourning the loss of Captain Jenko in a drunk driving crash, Hanson and Hoffs are assigned to get close to a high school principal after he receives death threats from a gang leader that he stood up to. He is taken hostage along with the 300 students at the school and it's up to Hanson, Hoffs, Ioki, and Penhall to save them with the help of their new captain. Note: First appearance of Steven Williams (Captain Adam Fuller). Guest star: Blair Underwood
8	8	"Bad Influence" "Boys Just Wanna Have Fun"	Kim Manners	Paul Bernbaum	May 24, 1987	16110	N/A
A high school girl becomes a prostitute in order to support herself and her drug-addicted mother in rehab. Meanwhile, two teenagers go on a spending spree after an ATM is broken into.
9	9	"Blindsided"	David Jackson	Jonathan Lemkin	May 31, 1987	16107	N/A
While busting drug dealers, Hanson and Penhall (in their "McQuaid brothers" cover) discover a girl who is being sexually abused by her father, a high-ranking police officer. She seeks out Hanson's help to carry out a hit on her father. Guest star: Sherilyn Fenn
10	10	"Next Generation"	David Nutter	Paul Bernbaum	June 7, 1987	16114	N/A
The son of a loan shark continues the family tradition, starting up his own cash-loan operation in a local high school and physically assaulting students and teachers who do not repay their debt on time. Guest star: Jason Lively
11	11	"Low and Away / Running on Ice"	Bill Corcoran	Bill Nuss & Paul Bernbaum	June 14, 1987	16113	N/A
Hoffs befriends a promising young high school baseball player from New York City who is in the federal witness protection program. Penhall pretends to be a baseball player to get closer to the young man and help protect him when his mobster father becomes a government witness. Guest star: Kurtwood Smith
12	12	"16 Blown to 35"	James Whitmore, Jr.	Clifton Campbell	June 21, 1987	16111	N/A
Officers Ioki and Hoffs go undercover in a teen modeling agency that is suspected to be a front for a pornography ring that exploits minors. Meanwhile, Captain Fuller comes across a down-and-out woman he previously arrested and sets his sights on the modeling academy's owner, in an effort to find those responsible for coercing the girls into making these films and bring them to justice. Guest stars: Sarah G. Buxton, David Paymer
13	13	"Mean Streets and Pastel Houses"	James Whitmore, Jr.	Jonathan Lemkin	June 28, 1987	16101	N/A
In the season one finale, Hanson goes "punk" to infiltrate suburban rival gangs in an attempt to halt their destruction and rescue one member caught between academics and anarchy. Guest stars: Jason Priestley, Bradley Gregg

=== Season 2 (1987–88) ===
No. overall	No. in season	Title	Directed by	Written by	Original release date	Prod. code	Rating (households)
14	1	"In the Custody of a Clown"	Kim Manners	Clifton Campbell	September 20, 1987	16203	4.4
The Jump Street team investigates whether a relative is responsible for a child's kidnapping. Guest stars: Kurtwood Smith, Barney Martin , Ray Walton
15	2	"Besieged (Part 1)"	Bill Corcoran	Jonathan Lemkin	September 27, 1987	16213	5.4
A 16-year-old crack dealer is mysteriously murdered and the Jump Street squad goes undercover in the seedy world of narcotics and prostitution. Guest stars: Renée Jones (her first appearance in the series), Bruce A. Young, Josh Richman
16	3	"Besieged (Part 2)"	Bill Corcoran	Jonathan Lemkin	October 4, 1987	16217	5.7
Officer Penhall suspects that a hired outside police expert is responsible for the wave of crack-related deaths. Guest stars: Bruce A. Young, Josh Richman
17	4	"Two For the Road"	Steve Beers	Paul Bernbaum	October 11, 1987	16207	5.6
The Jump Street squad puts a sting on a bar serving alcohol to underage kids and ironically discovers that their own captain has been arrested for drunk driving. Guest stars: Jason Priestley, Pauly Shore, Rob Stone, Susan Ursitti
18	5	"After School Special"	David Jackson	David Jackson	October 18, 1987	16209	5.7
Captain Fuller and Officer Hoffs go undercover on a violent high school campus where both students and faculty carry lethal weapons just to stay alive.
19	6	"Higher Education"	Larry Shaw	E. Paul Edwards	October 25, 1987	16211	5.1
Ioki faces a paternity suit and jail when a teen fingers him as the father of her child. Fuller has Hoffs and Penhall go undercover to find the truth and clear Ioki's name. Guest star: Michael Horton
20	7	"Don't Stretch the Rainbow"	Kim Manners	Patrick Hasburgh	November 1, 1987	16206	6.1
As Burgard High students and faculty sit on a powder keg of racial tension, Officers Hanson and Hoffs go undercover to defuse the potentially explosive situation in the racially divided high school. Guest star: Sam Vincent
21	8	"Honor Bound"	Bill Corcoran	Story by : Steven J. Albert & Scott Smith and E. Paul Edwards; Teleplay by : E. Paul Edwards	November 8, 1987	16212	5.6
Hanson, Penhall and Ioki investigate a rash of brutal assaults on homosexuals.
22	9	"You Ought to Be in Prison"	Kim Manners	Bill Nuss	November 15, 1987	16204	N/A
Tyrell "Waxer" Thompson, the drug dealer busted by Officer Hanson in his first Jump Street case, escapes state custody while being transported to an adult prison. After discovering that Hanson is working undercover to protect a Hollywood heartthrob in town filming a movie, Waxer looks to settle the score. Guest stars: Shannon Tweed, Lochlyn Munro
23	10	"How Much is That Body in the Window?"	Neill Fearnley	Clifton Campbell	November 22, 1987	162116	6.1
When an Olympic-bound gymnast dies of complications linked to steroid abuse, Officers Penhall and Hoffs go undercover on the athletically competitive Augustana High School campus to track down the source.
24	11	"Christmas in Saigon"	Kim Manners	Bill Nuss	December 20, 1987	16212	5.2
Officer Ioki may not be who he claims, as he is faced with immediate dismissal from the chapel when it's discovered that he is not Japanese, but is, in fact, a Vietnamese refugee. The team learns about Ioki's past and how he came to America. Guest star: Mindy Cohn
25	12	"Fear and Loathing with Russell Buckins" "Doin' The Quarter Mile In a Lifetime"	Kevin Hooks	Gary Skeen Hall	December 27, 1987	16214	4.3
Officer Hanson experiences a late teenage rebellion, putting his friendships—and his career—in jeopardy. Guest star: Liz Keifer
26	13	"A Big Disease With a Little Name"	Neill Fearnley	Patrick Hasburgh	February 7, 1988	16210	6.5
Hanson reluctantly takes a case where he must protect a teenage AIDS patient.
27	14	"Chapel of Love"	Michael Robison	Jonathan Lemkin & Bill Nuss	February 14, 1988	16222	5.2
To pacify their dateless state on Valentine's Day, the Jump Street squad plays poker and reminisces about their worst dates, while Hanson recollects on his prom night when his father was killed. Guest star: Mindy Cohn
28	15	"I'm OK - You Need Work"	Neill Fearnley	Clifton Campbell	February 21, 1988	16221	6.6
Following up on his first Jump Street case, Hanson goes undercover and is trapped inside an in-patient adolescent drug treatment center while investigating reports that the center is mistreating patients. Guest star: Christina Applegate
29	16	"Orpheus 3.3" "The Convenience Killer"	James Contner	Bill Nuss	February 28, 1988	16225	6.9
Hanson stalks a ruthless killer to avenge the cold-blooded murder of someone close to him.
30	17	"Champagne High"	Larry Shaw	Paul Bernbaum	March 6, 1988	16215	6.3
Officers Hanson and Penhall pose once again as the battling McQuaid brothers to infiltrate a gang of students being bussed from the wrong side of the tracks. A teenager is mentally and physically abused by his father. Guest stars: Peter Berg, Andrew Koenig, William B Davis, Gabriel Jarret
31	18	"Brother Hanson & the Miracle of Renner's Pond"	Bill Corcoran	E. Paul Edwards	March 13, 1988	16220	6.0
Hanson poses as a Bible-thumping student and befriends a like-minded teenager as he investigates an arson case involving book burning. Unfortunately for Hanson's new friend, his near-death experience leads him to be used by his father for a religious crusade against the teaching of evolution in school.
32	19	"Raising Marijuana"	Bill Corcoran	Jonathan Lemkin	April 17, 1988	16219	6.3
Hoffs fears she may have too close of a relationship to bust a guy on the wrong side of the law.
33	20	"Best Years Of Your Life"	Bill Corcoran	Jonathan Lemkin	May 1, 1988	16226	5.7
Penhall is forced to recount painful memories of his mother's suicide when a youth he's investigating takes his own life. Guest star: Brad Pitt
34	21	"Cory and Dean Got Married"	Kim Manners	Clifton Campbell	May 8, 1988	16228	5.3
When a young murderer and his bride are busted at their wedding, the desperate groom takes Hoffs hostage.
35	22	"School's Out"	Kim Manners	Eric Blakeney	May 22, 1988	16229	5.6
In the Season 2 finale, the Jump Street cops must find temporary jobs when school's out for the summer, and maybe forever. Hanson is the only one disguised as a McQuaid brother in this episode.

=== Season 3 (1988–89) ===
No. overall	No. in season	Title	Directed by	Written by	Original release date	Prod. code	U.S. viewers (millions)	Rating/share (households)
36	1	"Fun With Animals"	James Whitmore, Jr.	Eric Blakeney	November 6, 1988	16301	N/A	9.0/14
Hanson comes to blows with a new partner, Officer Dennis Booker, whom he suspects is as bigoted as the gang of racists they're about to bust. Note: First appearance of Richard Grieco (Officer Dennis Booker). Guest star: Janet Hubert
37	2	"Slippin' Into Darkness" "Date With an Angel"	James A. Contner	Clifton Campbell	November 11, 1988	16303	N/A	7.3/11
While Hanson and Booker try to catch a drug dealer, their investigation is impeded by a gang of young vigilantes known as The Rangers committed to help clean the streets of crime and violence. Guest star: Gloria Reuben
38	3	"The Currency We Trade In"	Neill Fearnley	Eric Blakeney	November 20, 1988	16302	N/A	7.3/11
Penhall almost wrings a confession from an alleged child molester, only to learn that his accuser—his soon-to-be ex-wife— recanted and admitted to lying to the police in order to retain sole custody of the couple's daughter. In order to atone for his overzealousness, Penhall must now help the one he was so eager to bust deal with the devastation of a false charge. Guest stars: Peri Gilpin, Yvette Nipar (her first appearance in the series)
39	4	"Coach of the Year"	James Whitmore, Jr.	Bill Nuss	November 27, 1988	16304	N/A	8.1/12
Officers Penhall and Booker join an all-state football team to investigate possible criminal negligence on the part of the coach when his star linebacker is paralyzed for life. Guest star: Yvette Nipar
40	5	"Whose Choice is it Anyway?"	Bill Corcoran	Story by : David Abramowitz; Teleplay by : Michelle Ashford	December 11, 1988	16306	10.8	6.8/11
The Jump Street team goes undercover at a school with a pregnancy clinic on campus in order to find out who has been vandalizing it. Ioki infiltrates a group protesting the clinic's presence on campus. Meanwhile, Booker tries to lift Blowfish's self-esteem by setting him up on a date with a beautiful stranger.
41	6	"Hell Week"	Jonathan Wacks	Bill Nuss	December 18, 1988	16318	11.3	7.5/13
Officers Hanson, Ioki, and Booker infiltrate two college fraternities in order to investigate a rape on campus. Hoffs goes undercover in a sorority and Penhall in a dorm. Guest star: Doug McKeon
42	7	"The Dragon and the Angel"	Jefferson Kibbee	E. Paul Edwards	January 15, 1989	16307	11.2	7.1/12
Officer Ioki infiltrates a Vietnamese gang to break up an extortion ring victimizing the local Vietnamese community, and is offered a chance to contact his grandmother, whom Ioki left behind in Vietnam after the war. Guest star: Kelly Hu
43	8	"Blu Flu"	Bill Corcoran	Clifton Campbell	January 29, 1989	16321	10.0	6.6/11
When the Association of Municipal Police Officers calls for a strike, the Jump Street cops are torn over whether or not to cross the picket line. As management, Captain Fuller must continue to work. Hanson observes the union negotiations and the rest of the team chooses to strike. Guest stars: Robert Romanus, Jon Lindstrom, Yvette Nipar
44	9	"Swallowed Alive"	James A. Contner	Eric Blakeney	February 5, 1989	16319	13.3	8.4/13
Officers Hanson, Penhall, Booker, and Ioki pose as inmates in a juvenile lock-up in order to find out how heroin is entering the facility. Hanson and Penhall become the McQuaid brothers, while Booker and Ioki are the Samurai brothers.
45	10	"What About Love?"	David Jackson	Michelle Ashford	February 12, 1989	16314	12.7	8.1/13
The Jump Street cops try to solve a serial flasher case. Hoffs learns that her new lover is married and when she tries to break off the relationship, he harasses her until she reluctantly goes to Fuller. Guest star: Yvette Nipar
46	11	"Woolly Bullies"	Bill Corcoran	Bruce Kirschbaum and Eric Blakeney & Bill Nuss	February 19, 1989	16320	13.8	8.7/14
While trying to infiltrate a high school computer club, Penhall is picked on by a bully, prompting each of the Jump Street cops to recall stories about having been terrorized by a bully at some point in their childhood. Guest stars: Maia Brewton, Dom DeLuise, Michael DeLuise (his first appearance on the series), Casey Ellison, Larenz Tate, Christopher Titus, R. J. Williams
47	12	"The Dreaded Return of Russell Buckins"	Rob Iscove	Marc Abraham and Paul Bernbaum	February 26, 1989	16305	12.6	8.1/13
When Russell Buckins pens a dangerously revealing magazine article about the Jump Street program, Officer Hanson is suspended and goes gunning for his old friend. Guest stars: Joseph Campanella, Yvette Nipar
48	13	"A.W.O.L."	Michael Robison	Story by : Peter L. Dixon and Glen Morgan & James Wong; Teleplay by : Glen Morgan & James Wong	March 19, 1989	16309	11.0	7.1/12
Penhall and Hanson are deputized into the U.S. Army's Criminal Investigation Division. Their assignment: Find a young Army private who went AWOL and get him back to his assigned unit before the Army prepares charges against him for desertion. Guest star: Patrick Labyorteaux
49	14	"Nemesis"	Ken Wiederhorn	John Truby	March 26, 1989	16315	8.9	5.9/11
Booker tries to bust a group of students for dealing and using drugs, but when one of them is killed for being an alleged narc, Booker begins to crack.
50	15	"Fathers and Sons"	Jefferson Kibbee	John Truby	April 9, 1989	16323	9.9	6.9/12
When the Jump Street cops are on the verge of busting the mayor's son for drug dealing, the mayor steps in and suspends Captain Fuller. Guest stars: Ricky Paull Goldin, Bobbie Eakes, Yvette Nipar
51	16	"High High"	Mario Van Peebles	Eric Blakeney & Bill Nuss	April 23, 1989	16329	8.1	5.6/11
When drug-dealing gets out of hand at a prestigious performing arts school, the Jump Street cops must join the act. Guest stars: Mario Van Peebles, Lochlyn Munro
52	17	"Blinded by the Thousand Points of Light"	Jorge Montesi	Glen Morgan & James Wong	April 30, 1989	16328	9.9	6.9/14
The Jump Street cops go undercover on the streets as homeless runaways to find a missing teenager and the predator who is preying on young street hustlers. Guest star: Bridget Fonda
53	18	"Next Victim"	James A. Contner	Bruce Kirschbaum	May 7, 1989	16330	9.7	6.4/12
When the controversial and bigoted host of a college radio talk show is nearly killed in an explosion, Booker takes over the show in an attempt to flush out the guilty party. Guest star: Brian Bloom
54	19	"Loc'd Out: Part 1" "Partners: Part 1"	James Whitmore, Jr.	Michelle Ashford & Eric Blakeney	May 14, 1989	16325	9.2	6.0/13
When Hanson and Ioki go undercover with two rival gangs to find their weapons supplier, Ioki is shot in the crossfire. A dirty cop seems to be selling guns to the gangs, and is shot when Hanson breaks into his house.
55	20	"Loc'd Out: Part 2" "Partners: Part 2"	James Whitmore, Jr.	Story by : John Truby & Glen Morgan & James Wong; Teleplay by : Eric Blakeney & Bill Nuss	May 21, 1989	16326	9.3	6.6/13
Hanson is suspected of killing a crooked cop who was responsible for Ioki's shooting. Although forensics proves that a third gun was fired the night Officer Tower was killed, a jury finds Hanson guilty of murder. Turning to Penhall for help, Hanson goes on the run. He is eventually caught and put on trial.

=== Season 4 (1989–90) ===
No. overall	No. in season	Title	Directed by	Written by	Original release date	Prod. code	U.S. viewers (millions)
56	1	"Draw the Line"	Kim Manners	Glen Morgan & James Wong	September 18, 1989	16404	10.1
Officer Booker solves the case that clears Hanson and gets him released from prison, then resigns from the police force. Note: This episode marks the departure of series regular Richard Grieco, who would go on to star in the spin-off series Booker. Guest star: Robert Romanus
57	2	"Say It Ain't So, Pete"	Jefferson Kibbee	Bill Nuss	September 25, 1989	16405	7.7
Officer Penhall works as a bouncer at a sports bar while Hanson goes undercover to bust up a college gambling operation. The officers study for the Detective exam. Guest stars: Rick Aiello, Rob Estes, Stu Nahan
58	3	"Eternal Flame"	Mario Van Peebles	David Stenn	October 2, 1989	16406	8.4
The owner of an 80s nightclub suspected of providing LSD to high school students is the husband of an old flame of Hanson's. Guest star: Thomas Haden Church
59	4	"Come from the Shadows"	David Nutter	Story by : Larry Barber & Paul Barber and Sharon Elizabeth Doyle; Teleplay by : Larry Barber & Paul Barber	October 9, 1989	16308	7.6
Officers Penhall, Hoffs, and Ioki investigate a priest in a Catholic university suspected of selling Salvadorean babies to finance an underground sanctuary movement. Penhall falls for an illegal immigrant from El Salvador suspected of working with the priest. When she is caught by the INS, he offers to marry her. Guest star: Billy Warlock
60	5	"God is a Bullet"	Jefferson Kibbee	John Truby	October 16, 1989	16331	8.7
Penhall and Hoffs go undercover to investigate a new principal who goes too far in trying to clean up his crime-ridden high school.
61	6	"Old Haunts in a New Age"	Jefferson Kibbee	Glen Morgan & James Wong	October 30, 1989	16407	9.2
Officers Hanson and Penhall go into a high school to investigate a serial arsonist. A psychic teen predicts that the arsonist will next strike during the school's Halloween dance.
62	7	"Out of Control"	Mario Van Peebles	Thania St. John	November 6, 1989	16408	8.7
Hanson goes into a high school to investigate a series of burglaries in an upscale community and hooks up with a group of thrill-seeking teens. Penhall and Ioki work as rent-a-cops. Guest star: Christine Elise
63	8	"Stand by Your Man"	Daniel Attias	Michelle Ashford	November 13, 1989	16403	10.2
An investigation into designer drugs leads the officers to a prestigious medical school. Meanwhile, newly-promoted detective Hoffs is raped while on a date with one of the suspects who later claims it was she who seduced him.
64	9	"Mike's P.O.V."	Jorge Montesi	Story by : John Truby; Teleplay by : Glen Morgan & James Wong	November 20, 1989	16410	9.1
A teacher's wife is shot down and the investigation leads to the husband paying a student to kill her. Guests: Vince Vaughn , Robyn Lively
65	10	"Wheels and Deals, Part Two"	Jefferson Kibbee	Thania St. John	November 27, 1989	16414	11.7
A tip from Booker has the Jump Street officers joining Raymond Crane's motorcycle group in order to bring him to justice. This episode begins on Booker. Guest star: Lochlyn Munro
66	11	"Parental Guidance Suggested"	Jeffrey Auerbach	Sam Bushwick and Glen Morgan & James Wong	December 4, 1989	16311	8.8
Hoffs begins to suspect that a boy is being abused by his father while observing a family suspected of operating a burglary ring.
67	12	"Things We Said Today"	Tucker Gates	Glen Morgan & James Wong	December 18, 1989	16333	7.8
A teen seeks revenge on Ioki after he convinced him to turn his family in for using drugs 3 years earlier. Guest: Shannen Doherty , Dirk Blocker
68	13	"Research and Destroy"	Jefferson Kibbee	Gary Rosen	January 8, 1990	16409	7.8
The officers are sent to investigate a chemistry lab at a college where it is suspected that new designer drugs are being manufactured. Guest starring Darren Mayes.
69	14	"A Change of Heart"	Jan Eliasberg	Michelle Ashford	January 15, 1990	16413	8.9
The death of a lesbian professor finds Hoffs and Fuller going undercover at a university. A student teacher's assistant develops romantic feelings for Fuller. Guest stars: Kathryn Leigh Scott, Larry Cedar, and Lela Rochon.
70	15	"Back from the Future"	Peter DeLuise	David Stenn	January 29, 1990	16412	9.6
A futuristic episode where the year is 2040 and the now aged officers are interviewed about the old days when Jump Street originated.
71	16	"2245"	Kim Manners	Michelle Ashford & Glen Morgan & James Wong	February 5, 1990	16419	8.0
Hanson is invited to witness the execution of Ronnie Seebook, who is on death row for murdering a convenience store clerk, and asks the condemned inmate to make a film to scare off children from becoming criminals. Guest star: Rosie Perez.
72	17	"Hi Mom"	James Whitmore, Jr.	Bill Nuss	February 12, 1990	16415	8.5
Hanson and Penhall investigate the drug related death of a basketball star and stumble into a point shaving scheme. Guest star: Kareem Abdul-Jabbar.
73	18	"Awomp-Bomp-Aloobomb, Aloop Bamboom"	Jorge Montesi	Glen Morgan & James Wong	February 19, 1990	16416	10.0
The investigation of a bomber leads Hanson and Penhall to Florida during the madness of spring break.
74	19	"La Bizca"	David Nutter	Larry Barber & Paul Barber	February 26, 1990	16411	8.5
Hanson and Penhall go to El Salvador to look for Doug's missing wife and find themselves in the middle of political turmoil. They return home with Marta's nephew to be raised by Penhall. Guest star: Richard Roundtree. Absent: Holly Robinson, Dustin Nguyen, and Steven Williams.
75	20	"Last Chance High"	Kim Manners	Michelle Ashford	March 19, 1990	16422	7.8
A teenager kidnaps her baby sister to get her away from their abusive parents; meanwhile Penhall adjusts to becoming a father to Clavo.
76	21	"Unfinished Business"	Daniel Attias	Story by : Julie Friedgen and Geri Jewell & Marc Powell; Teleplay by : Julie Friedgen	April 9, 1990	16418	6.9
A handicapped policewoman is sent in undercover to investigate a series of attacks on handicapped women and Hoffs is sent in by Fuller undercover, in a wheelchair. Guest star: Geri Jewell.
77	22	"Shirts and Skins" "A New Breeze Blowing"	Jorge Montesi	Larry Barber & Paul Barber	April 30, 1990	16420	6.9
Hoffs and Ioki go undercover in a liberal group suspected of killing the leader of a neo-Nazi group while Penhall joins the Nazis to learn if they plan a violent uprising. Guest star: Steven Eckholdt
78	23	"How I Saved the Senator"	James Whitmore, Jr.	Gary Rosen	May 7, 1990	16423	6.9
The officers tell their version of the story of how they saved a Senator from an assassin, each story with them as the hero. This was the last episode of season 4 that Johnny Depp was filmed in. Guest star: Ray Parker Jr.
79	24	"Rounding Third"	Jefferson Kibbee	Gary Rosen	May 14, 1990	16427	6.8
Little League coach Penhall learns that one of the players was kidnapped by his father, away from his mother and step-father. Absent: Johnny Depp
80	25	"Everyday is Christmas"	Ken Wiederhorn	Story by : David Gascon and Glen Morgan & James Wong; Teleplay by : Glen Morgan & James Wong	May 21, 1990	16424	7.6
After Penhall abandons Ioki on a stake-out for a personal emergency, he is reassigned to uniformed patrol. At his new precinct, Penhall becomes involved with a group of corrupt officers while befriending rookie cop Dean Garrett–whom the other officers accuse of being a plant for Internal Affairs. Note: This episode marks the final appearance of Dustin Nguyen on the series. First recurring appearance of David Barry Gray (Dean Garrett). Absent: Johnny Depp and Holly Robinson.
81	26	"Blackout" "Business as Usual"	Tucker Gates	Story by : Alan McElroy; Teleplay by : Larry Barber & Paul Berber	July 16, 1990	16417	6.9
After the power goes out during a storm, Penhall, Hanson and Hoffs find themselves at the mercy of a violent gang in school. Note: This episode marks the final appearance of Johnny Depp on the series. This is the final episode of the series to air on Fox. Absent: Dustin Nguyen and Steven Williams.

=== Season 5 (1990–91) ===
No. overall	No. in season	Title	Directed by	Written by	Original release date	Prod. code
82	1	"Tunnel of Love"	Jorge Montesi	Michelle Ashford	October 13, 1990	16426
In his first Jump Street assignment, Dean Garrett goes undercover with Hoffs in a massage parlor believed to be the front for a drug ring. Garrett takes an interest to a worker in the parlor, who turns out to be an undercover DEA officer. Notes: First recurring appearance of Alexandra Powers (Kati Rocky). This was the first episode to air in first-run syndication. Absent: Johnny Depp, Peter DeLuise, Dustin Nguyen.
83	2	"Back to School"	Steve Beers	Glen Morgan & James Wong	October 20, 1990	16425
Former DEA agent Kati Rocky has joined the Jump Street program, and partners with Garrett to investigate a recurrence of drug dealing at a school recently busted by the other officers. Garrett's estranged brother makes an unannounced visit, and Garrett discloses he was adopted while Rocky confesses to having dropped out of high school. Meanwhile, Detective Hoffs purchases her first home. Notes: Final recurring appearances of Sal Jenco, David Barry Gray, and Alexandra Powers. This episode was originally produced for Season 4. Departed cast members Johnny Depp and Dustin Nguyen are featured in the opening sequence. Absent: Peter DeLuise.
84	3	"Buddy System"	Jorge Montesi	Jonathan Glassner & David Levinson	October 27, 1990	16504
Officer Tony McCann joins Jump Street and is partnered with a mentally-impaired teen in a school buddy system to investigate the death of the teen's former buddy. Notes: First appearance of Michael Bendetti (McCann). Peter DeLuise makes his first "special appearance". This is the first episode produced for first-run syndication. Guest star: Scott Grimes
85	4	"Poison"	Don McBrearty	Ann Donahue	November 3, 1990	16501
Penhall falls for his narcotics partner who seems to have a drug problem of her own.
86	5	"Just Say No! High"	Randy Bradshaw	Sharon E. Doyle	November 10, 1990	16503
While working undercover in a high school, Hoffs is suspended by Jump Street after failing a drug test. While Penhall investigates a drug ring at a high school, he becomes suspicious why a star basketball player refuses to take part in the schools anti-drug program.
87	6	"Brothers"	Don McBrearty	Jonathan Glassner	November 17, 1990	16511
Doug's younger brother Joey joins Jump Street. After being rejected by Doug, he volunteers to go undercover in a cult and soon becomes brainwashed by their leader and a pretty girl who shows him love. Notes: First appearance of Michael DeLuise (Joey Penhall).
88	7	"This Ain't No Summer Camp"	Peter D. Marshall	Morgan Gendel	November 24, 1990	16515
Doug and Joey join a wilderness camp for troubled teens to investigate a possible murder, but are constantly harassed by the leader, a former Marine.
89	8	"The Girl Next Door"	Brenton Spencer	Jonathan Glassner	December 1, 1990	16516
McCann investigates a murder of a high school football star and dates a cheerleader who has AIDS. Guest star: Lochlyn Munro
90	9	"Diplomas for Sale"	Randy Bradshaw	Thomas Perry and Jo Perry	December 8, 1990	16508
Doug and Joey enroll in a college where good students are becoming criminals.
91	10	"Number One with a Bullet"	Peter DeLuise	Ann Donahue	December 22, 1990	16513
Doug's life enters limbo while doctors struggle to save him after being shot. He begins to make life-altering career choices after talking with those he meets there. Note: This episode marks the final appearance of Peter DeLuise on the series.
92	11	"Equal Protection"	Brad Turner	Jeff Myrow	January 5, 1991	16505
Hoffs and Fuller investigate white police officers who are believed to be beating black teens.
93	12	"The Education of Terry Carver"	Randy Bradshaw	Thomas Perry & Jo Perry	January 14, 1991	16509
Hoffs, Joey and Mac try to find evidence surrounding a girl who was attacked and raped. No one believes that she was victimized by a guy on her college campus.
94	13	"Baby Blues"	Zale Dalen	Deborah Starr Seibel	January 21, 1991	16506
Joey takes responsibility for a baby girl while trying to find her drug addicted mother.
95	14	"Film at Eleven"	Peter DeLuise	David Levinson	February 9, 1991	16520
Mac tries to solve the mystery of why a famous reporter's daughter had been missing. Guest star: Don S. Davis Absent: Holly Robinson.
96	15	"In the Name of Love"	Zale Dalen	Story by : James L. Novak and Jonathan Glassner; Teleplay by : Jonathan Glassner	February 16, 1991	16521
Mac goes undercover for the FBI by dating the daughter of a notorious drug dealer while trying to rekindle a romance with an old flame. Absent: Holly Robinson.
97	16	"Coppin' Out" "Cop Love"	Brad Turner	Simon Ayer	February 23, 1991	16518
Mac and Joey try to find who is responsible for a series of robberies at a retirement home with one suspect being the son of Fuller's girlfriend. Note: This episode marks the final appearance of Michael DeLuise in the series. Absent: Holly Robinson. Guest stars: Markus Redmond.
98	17	"Under the Influence"	Jorge Montesi	Sharon E. Doyle	March 23, 1991	16517
Mac enters a devil worship cult whose leader can lure boys to join them with her beauty. Absent: Holly Robinson.
99	18	"Crossfire"	Jorge Montesi	Ann Donahue	March 30, 1991	16523
Hoffs is brought to court after being charged with a civil suit for arresting a man for solicitation. Guest stars: Renée Jones (her second appearance in the series) and Geoffrey Thorne.
100	19	"Wasted"	Brenton Spencer	Sharon E. Doyle	April 6, 1991	16519
Mac goes undercover as a football player after the school's star player dies from a heart attack. He uncovers toxic waste being dumped along a stream which runs under the football field–and that a teammate's father may be responsible. Absent: Holly Robinson.
101	20	"Bad Day at Blackburn"	Brenton Spencer	Thomas Perry & Jo Perry	April 13, 1991	16510
A group of high school extortionists has Hoffs, Mac and Fuller going in undercover to investigate.
102	21	"Homegirls"	Brad Turner	Jeff Myrow	April 20, 1991	16522
Hoffs infiltrates a girl gang to find who is responsible for a murder of a teen she witnessed. Guest star: Jada Pinkett.
103	22	"Second Chances"	Steven Williams	Jim Brown	April 27, 1991	16502
Hoffs and Mac investigate a car theft ring with the prime suspect being one of Hoffs' own students. Notes: Departed cast member Peter DeLuise appears in the opening sequence, but does not appear in this episode.
