= Antagonist =

Character of a work actively opposing the protagonist

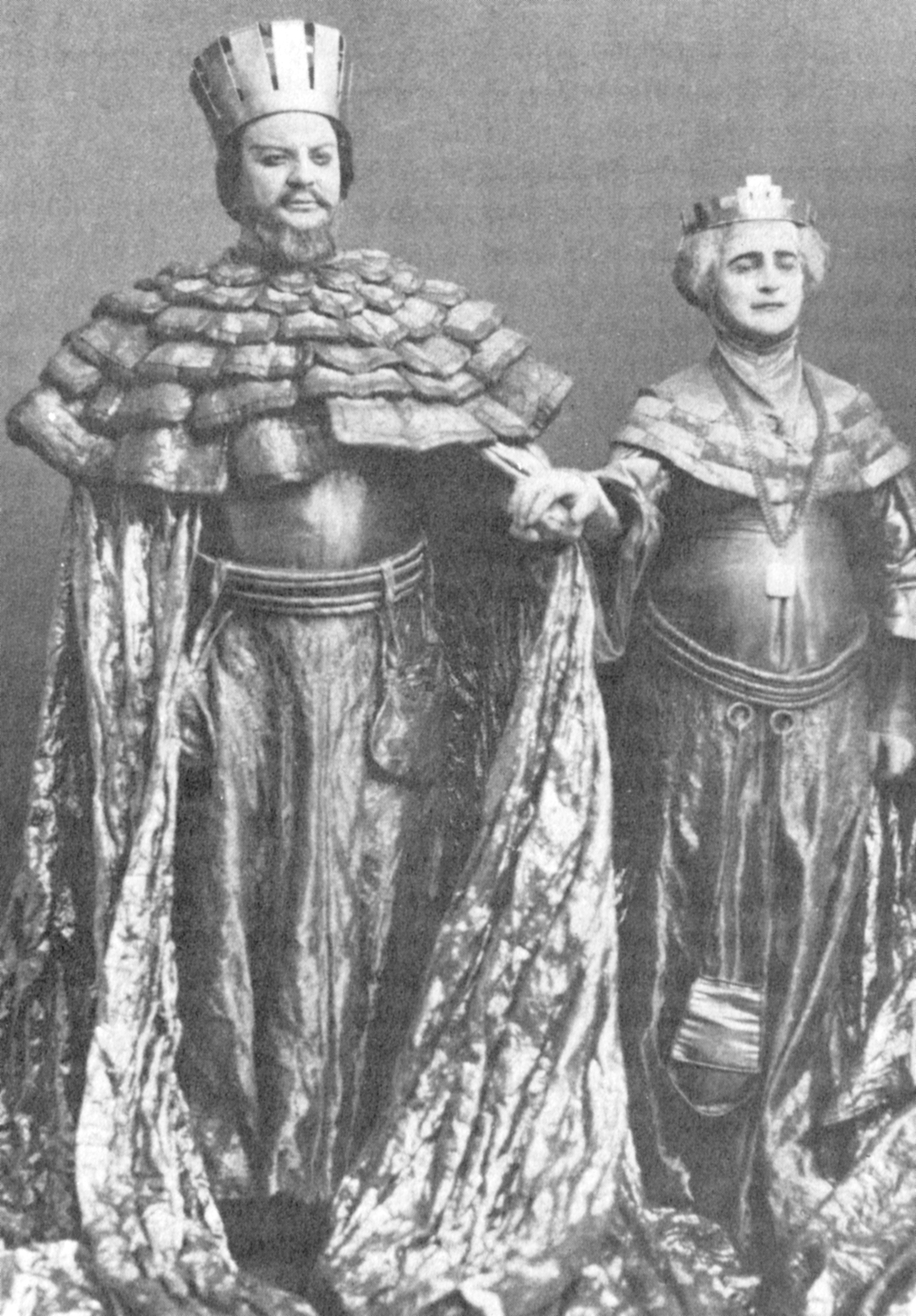
King Claudius, the antagonist, is married to Queen Gertrude in William Shakespeare's Hamlet.

An antagonist is a character in a story who is presented as the main enemy or rival of the protagonist and is often depicted as a villain.

== Etymology ==
The English word antagonist comes from (from Ancient Greek ἀνταγωνιστής (antagōnistḗs) 'opponent, competitor, villain, enemy, rival, which is derived from anti- ("against") and agonizesthai ("to contend for a prize"').

== Types ==
=== Heroes and villains ===
The antagonist is commonly positioned against the protagonist and their world order. While narratives often portray the protagonist as a hero and the antagonist as a villain, like Harry Potter and Lord Voldemort in Harry Potter, the antagonist does not always appear as the villain. In some narratives, like Light Yagami and L in Death Note, the protagonist is a villain and the antagonist is an opposing hero.

Antagonists are conventionally presented as making moral choices less savory than those of protagonists. This condition is often used by an author to create conflict within a story. This is merely a convention, however. An example in which this is reversed can be seen in the character Macduff from Macbeth, who is arguably morally correct in his desire to fight the tyrant Macbeth, the protagonist.

Examples from television include J.R. Ewing (Larry Hagman) from Dallas and Alexis Colby (Joan Collins) from Dynasty. Both became breakout characters used as a device to increase their shows' ratings.

=== Other characters ===
Characters may be antagonists without being evil – they may simply be injudicious and unlikeable for the audience. In some stories, such as The Catcher in the Rye, almost every character other than the protagonist may be an antagonist. Another example of this occurring is through Javert in Victor Hugo's Les Misérables, in which Javert displays no malicious intent, but instead represents the rigid and inflexible application of the law, even when it leads to moral and ethical dilemmas.

=== Aspects of the protagonist ===
An aspect or trait of the protagonist may be considered an antagonist, such as morality or indecisiveness.

=== Non-personal ===
An antagonist is not always a person or people. In some cases, an antagonist may be a force, such as a tidal wave that destroys a city; a storm that causes havoc; or even a certain area's conditions that are the root cause of a problem. An antagonist may or may not create obstacles for the protagonist.

Societal norms or other rules may also be antagonists.

== Usage ==
An antagonist is used as a plot device, to set up conflicts, obstacles, or challenges for the protagonist. Though not every story requires an antagonist, it often is used in plays to increase the level of drama. In tragedies, antagonists are often the cause of the protagonist's main problem, or lead a group of characters against the protagonist; in comedies, they are usually responsible for involving the protagonist in comedic situations.

== Antagonist-design techniques ==
Author John Truby argues that a true opponent not only wants to prevent the hero from achieving his desire but is competing with the hero for the same goal. According to John Truby, "It is only by competing for the same goal that the hero and the opponent are forced to come into direct conflict and to do so again and again throughout the story."

== See also ==
- Archenemy – Main enemy of someone
- Boss (video games) – Significant and especially strong opponent in video games
- Villain – Evil character or person
