= P (album) =

Studio album by P
- Released: November 21, 1995
- Genre: Alternative rock
- Length: 57:08
- Label: Capitol
- Producer: Andrew Weiss

Singles from P
- 1. "Michael Stipe" Released: 1995

P is the debut and only album by American alternative rock band P, featuring Bill Carter, Johnny Depp, Gibby Haynes and Sal Jenco. It was released on November 21, 1995, through Capitol Records and was reissued on May 8, 2007, under the Caroline Records label. Produced by bassist Andrew Weiss, the album also featured contributions from Red Hot Chili Peppers bassist Flea, Sex Pistols guitarist Steve Jones, and pianist and Los Angeles scene fixture Chuck E. Weiss.

The album features a diverse "array of alternative rock, touching on funk metal, R.E.M.-style folk-rock, and grunge." The album also features cover versions of Daniel Johnston's "I Save Cigarette Butts" and ABBA's "Dancing Queen." The track "Michael Stipe," named after the R.E.M. frontman, was released as a single in 1995 and received airplay on alternative radio.

== Critical reception ==
Professional ratings
Review scores
Source	Rating
AllMusic	4/5 stars
Robert Christgau	(choice cut)
Los Angeles Times	3/4 stars
Q	1/5 stars

CD Review panned the album, stating, "Though the group aims to be something other than a Gen X conversation piece, much of this debut is pointless dross." In Q, David Quantick awarded the album one out of five stars. He wrote, "Records made by actors are dreadful (there are no exceptions)... The result makes the phrase 'self-indulgence' seem puny and not up to the job." Sandy Masuo of the Los Angeles Times gave the album three out of four stars, describing it as "a surreal blend of rough-hewn rock, Gothic Western twang and psychedelic dub."

In a retrospective review, AllMusic senior editor Stephen Thomas Erlewine noted the band's eclectic musical style. He stated: "While they are musically proficient, some of their songs aren't quite up to par. Nevertheless, their debut album is a surprisingly enjoyable effort."

== Track listing ==
All tracks are written by P, unless otherwise noted.

No.	Title	Writer(s)	Length
1.	"I Save Cigarette Butts" (Daniel Johnston cover)	Daniel Johnston	3:43
2.	"Zing Splash"		3:16
3.	"Michael Stipe"		4:25
4.	"Oklahoma"		3:38
5.	"Dancing Queen" (ABBA cover)	Benny Andersson, Björn Ulvaeus, Stig Anderson	3:47
6.	"Jon Glenn (Mega Mix)"		9:00
7.	"Mr. Officer"		3:43
8.	"White Man Sings the Blues"		6:40
9.	"Die Anne"		4:43
10.	"Scrapings from Ring"		7:51
11.	"The Deal"		6:05
Total length:			57:08

== Personnel ==
P

- Bill Carter – guitar, bass
- Johnny Depp – guitar, bass
- Gibby Haynes – vocals, artwork
- Sal Jenco – drums, percussion

Additional musicians

- Ruth Ellsworth-Carter – keyboards
- Flea – bass
- Steve Jones – guitar
- Chuck E. Weiss – washboard

Technical personnel

- Andrew Weiss – production, bass, mellotron, Moog, guitar
- Tim Devine – A&R
- Tommy Steele – art direction
- Wendy Dougan – art direction, design
- Christina Bookman – artwork (print production)
- Richard Huredia – additional engineering
