= P (band) =

American alternative rock band

- Origin: Hollywood, California, United States
- Genres: Alternative rock
- Years active: 1993–1995, 1997
- Label: Capitol
- Past members: Bill Carter; Johnny Depp; Gibby Haynes; Sal Jenco

P was an American alternative rock band formed in early 1993 by Butthole Surfers frontman Gibby Haynes (vocals), actor Johnny Depp (guitar/bass), actor Sal Jenco (percussion), and songwriter Bill Carter (guitar/bass).

== History ==
The band performed their first show at the Austin Music Awards in 1993, and released their eponymous debut album on November 21, 1995, under Capitol Records. It was reissued on May 8, 2007 under Caroline Records. They often played the odd gig at The Viper Room, of which Depp used to be co-owner. One of these gigs was played on October 30, 1993, where the line-up included Flea of Red Hot Chili Peppers. Haynes, along with other members of the line-up that night, was a good friend of actor River Phoenix. While the band were in the middle of their song "Michael Stipe", which includes the lines "I'm glad I met old Michael Stipe, I didn't get to see his car. Him and River Phoenix were leaving on the road tomorrow" and "but we didn't have a part, not a piece of our heart, not Michael, River Phoenix or Flea or me," Phoenix (unbeknownst to the band at the time) was outside the venue having seizures on the sidewalk. Phoenix died in the early hours of October 31 of heart failure, brought on by an overdose of cocaine and heroin.

== Discography ==
Studio albums

- P (1995, Capitol Records)

Singles

- "Michael Stipe" (1995)
