= Truby =

Truby is a surname. Notable people with this surname include:

- Chris Truby (born 1973), third baseman who played some of his career in Major League Baseball
- Harry Truby (1870–1953), former professional baseball player who was an infielder in the Major Leagues from 1895 to 1896
- Jason Truby (born 1973), American musician
- John Truby (born 1952), screenwriter, director and screenwriting teacher
- Jamie Truby (born 2008) Youth Player notably for Littlehampton Town FC

== See also ==
- Truby King CMG (1858–1938), generally known as Truby King, was a New Zealand health reformer and Director of Child Welfare
