= 22 Jump Street =

2014 comedy film by Phil Lord and Christopher Miller

- Theatrical release poster
- Directed by: Phil Lord; Christopher Miller
- Screenplay by: Michael Bacall; Oren Uziel; Rodney Rothman
- Story by: Michael Bacall; Jonah Hill
- Based on: 21 Jump Street by Patrick Hasburgh; Stephen J. Cannell
- Produced by: Neal H. Moritz; Jonah Hill; Channing Tatum
- Starring: Jonah Hill; Channing Tatum; Peter Stormare; Ice Cube
- Cinematography: Barry Peterson
- Edited by: David Rennie; Keith Brachmann
- Music by: Mark Mothersbaugh
- Production companies: Columbia Pictures; Metro-Goldwyn-Mayer Pictures; LStar Capital; MRC; Original Film; Cannell Studios; Storyville; 75 Year Plan Productions
- Distributed by: Sony Pictures Releasing
- Release dates: June 4, 2014 (New York City); June 13, 2014 (United States)
- Running time: 112 minutes
- Country: United States
- Language: English
- Budget: $50–84.5 million
- Box office: $331.3 million

22 Jump Street is a 2014 American action comedy film directed by Phil Lord and Christopher Miller, written by Michael Bacall, Oren Uziel and Rodney Rothman, from a story by Bacall and Jonah Hill, and produced by and starring Hill and Channing Tatum. Ice Cube and Peter Stormare also star. It is the second film in the Jump Street franchise and a sequel to the 2012 film 21 Jump Street, which is based on the television series of the same name. The plot follows police officers Schmidt and Jenko as they go undercover at a college in order to find the supplier of a new drug.

Plans for a Jump Street sequel began the week of the first film's release. Hill and Tatum were quickly confirmed to be reprising their roles, while Miller and Lord announced they'd be returning to direct in July 2013. Filming took place from September to December of that same year in New Orleans, Louisiana, as well as San Juan, Puerto Rico.

22 Jump Street premiered on June 4, 2014, in New York City, and was theatrically released in the United States on June 13 by Columbia Pictures and Metro-Goldwyn-Mayer Pictures (MGM). It received a critical and box office success, grossed $331 million worldwide. A third film, 24 Jump Street, with Hill, Tatum, and Cube returning, is in development.

== Plot ==
Two years following their success in the 21 Jump Street program, Schmidt and Jenko are back on the streets investigating narcotics trafficking. However, after they fail in the pursuit of a group of drug dealers led by a kingpin known as "The Ghost", Deputy Chief Hardy puts them back on the undercover program to work for Captain Dickson – now located across the street at 22 Jump Street. Their assignment is to go undercover as college students and locate the supplier of a synthetic drug known as "WHY-PHY" ("Work Hard? Yes, Play Hard? Yes") that killed a student photographed buying it on campus from a dealer.

At college, Jenko befriends jocks Zook and Rooster, who become the prime suspects of the investigation. He starts attending parties with the jocks, who do not take as kindly to Schmidt. Meanwhile, Schmidt gets the attention of an art student, Maya, by feigning an interest in slam poetry. After hitting it off, the two have sex, to the chagrin of Maya's roommate Mercedes, and Schmidt finds out that Maya is the daughter of Captain Dickson. Despite sleeping together, Maya tells Schmidt not to take it seriously, and he feels left out as Jenko bonds with Zook, who encourages him to join the football team.

When Schmidt and Jenko are unable to identify the dealer, they visit Mr. Walters and Eric in prison for advice (with Eric being in a forced relationship with Mr. Walters, who received a vagina after Schmidt shot his penis off), and Walters points out a unique tattoo on the arm of the dealer in the photograph. Jenko notices that Rooster does not have the tattoo but sees it on Zook's arm. Schmidt and Jenko are invited to join a fraternity led by the jocks, but Schmidt refuses, furthering the tension between the two as Jenko passes their requirements. They realize that Zook is not the dealer but rather a customer. Soon afterwards, they find The Ghost and his men on campus, but The Ghost evades them. Jenko reveals to Schmidt that he has been offered a football scholarship with Zook and is uncertain about his future as a police officer. A chase ensues around campus, with Jenko and Schmidt commandeering a golf cart, which they crash into a football match. Schmidt later reveals his true identity and moves out of the dorm, angering Maya.

Spring break arrives, and Schmidt goes after The Ghost. He is joined by Jenko, so the two can have one final mission together. The pair head to the beach, where The Ghost is likely to be dealing WHY-PHY. Inside a bar, they find Mercedes, who is The Ghost's daughter, giving instructions to other dealers. The pair, backed up by Dickson and the rest of Jump Street, ambush the meeting, causing The Ghost to flee and Mercedes to take Dickson hostage. Schmidt chases Mercedes and apprehends her with the help of Dickson and Maya. The Ghost attempts to escape in a helicopter, but Jenkins throws in a grenade that detonates, killing him. Jenko tells Schmidt that he still wants to be a police officer as he believes their differences help their partnership, and the two reconcile. Dickson approaches them claiming to have a new mission undercover at a medical school.

During the end credits, Jenko and Schmidt go on a variety of undercover missions to different schools, which are portrayed as 21 fictional sequels, one in which Schmidt is played by Seth Rogen (which only Jenko seemed to notice) after a contract dispute with Jonah Hill; an animated series; a video game; an electronic target game; and a toy line. One mission features Detective Booker while another sees the return of The Ghost, who survived the helicopter explosion. The post-credits scene shows Eric and Mr. Walters lying in bed together, with Mr. Walters suggesting that he's pregnant with Eric's child.

== Cast ==
- Jonah Hill as Morton Schmidt
- Channing Tatum as Greg Jenko
- Peter Stormare as The Ghost
- Wyatt Russell as Zook Haythe
- Amber Stevens as Maya Dickson
- Jillian Bell as Mercedes
- Ice Cube as Captain Dickson
- Keith Lucas as Keith Yang
- Kenny Lucas as Kenny Yang
- Nick Offerman as Deputy Chief Hardy
- Jimmy Tatro as Rooster
- Craig Roberts as Spencer
- Marc Evan Jackson as Dr. Murphy
- Queen Latifah as Mrs. Dickson (uncredited)
- Diplo as Himself
- Dustin Nguyen as Vietnamese Jesus
- Richard Grieco as Dennis Booker
- Dave Franco as Eric Molson (uncredited)
- Rob Riggle as Mr. Walters (uncredited)
- H. Jon Benjamin as MCS Football Coach (uncredited)
- Patton Oswalt as MC State History Professor (uncredited)
- Bill Hader as Culinary School Villain (uncredited)
- Anna Faris as Anna (uncredited)
- Seth Rogen as a Morton Schmidt replacement actor (uncredited)

== Production ==
On March 17, 2012, Sony Pictures announced that it was pursuing a sequel to 21 Jump Street, signing a deal that would see Jonah Hill and Michael Bacall return to write a script treatment that would be again developed by Bacall and undergo rewrites by Oren Uziel and Rodney Rothman. The film was originally scheduled to be released on June 6, 2014. On May 8, 2013, it was announced that the film would be pushed back a week until June 13, 2014. In June 2013, it was announced the film would be titled 22 Jump Street. In July 2013, Phil Lord and Christopher Miller confirmed they would return to direct the film. On September 6, 2013, Amber Stevens joined the cast of the film. On September 27, 2013, Kurt Russell mentioned that his son Wyatt turned down a role in The Hunger Games sequels to star in 22 Jump Street. Principal photography began on September 28, 2013, in New Orleans, Louisiana, which was also followed by location shots in San Juan, Puerto Rico (standing in for the fictional "Puerto Mexico" for the spring break scenes), and ended on December 15, 2013. On-campus scenes featuring the fictional MC State were filmed on the uptown campus of Tulane University.

According to Phil Lord and Christopher Miller in the home release commentary, they wanted Cate Blanchett for the end credits sequence in a cameo appearance as a follow-up to the carte blanche joke, but she was busy with Carol, The Monuments Men and How to Train Your Dragon 2.

The end titles, featuring satirical concepts for an ongoing series of Jump Street films and merchandise, were designed by the studio Alma Mater.

== Music ==
The score for the film was composed by Mark Mothersbaugh and was released by La-La Land Records on a double disc album, limited to 2,000 copies, in September 2014. The second disc of the album also contains the score from the film's predecessor, 21 Jump Street, composed by Mothersbaugh as well.

A soundtrack album was also released, featuring songs used in the film and others specially released for it. The first single was "22 Jump Street", performed by Angel Haze and Ludacris. Songs such as "Turn Down for What" by DJ Snake and Lil Jon, "Higher" by Creed, #STUPiDFACEDD" by wallpaper., "Drop Girl" by Ice Cube and others were used during the film, but weren't included in the album. It was released on 10 June 2014 and reached #129 on Billboard 200, #4 in US Top Electronic Albums and #6 in US Top Soundtrack Albums.

== Release ==
=== Box office ===
22 Jump Street grossed $191.7 million in North America and $139.4 million in other countries for a worldwide total of $331.3 million, against a budget of $84.5 million. It outgrossed the first Jump Street film, which made a total of $201.6 million during its theatrical run. Deadline Hollywood calculated the net profit of the film to be $144.4 million, when factoring together "production budgets, P&A, talent participations and other costs, with box office grosses, and ancillary revenues from VOD to DVD and TV," placing it 10th on their list of 2014's "Most Valuable Blockbusters".

22 Jump Street grossed $5.5 million at its early Thursday night showings. On its opening day it grossed $25 million, including the early Thursday showings. In North America, the film opened at number one in its first weekend, with $57.1 million. In its second weekend, the film dropped to number two, grossing an additional $27.5 million. In its third weekend, the film stayed at number two, grossing $15.8 million. In its fourth weekend, the film dropped to number three, grossing $9.8 million.

=== Critical response ===
On Rotten Tomatoes 22 Jump Street has an approval rating of 84% based on 224 reviews, with an average rating of 7.00/10. The site's critical consensus reads, "Boasting even more of the bromantic chemistry between its stars – and even more of the goofy, good-natured humor that made its predecessor so much fun – 22 Jump Street is the rare sequel that improves upon the original." On Metacritic, the film has a weighted average score of 71 out of 100, based on 46 critics, indicating "generally favorable" reviews. Audiences polled by CinemaScore gave the film an average grade of "A−" on an A+ to F scale, higher than the 'B' received by its predecessor.

Inkoo Kang of The Wrap gave the film a positive review, saying "If 22 isn't as trim and tight as its predecessor, it's certainly smarter and more heartfelt. Whether this sequel is better than the original is up for debate, but the franchise has definitely grown up." Chris Nashawaty of Entertainment Weekly gave the film a B−, saying "Hill's neurotic-motormouth act and Tatum's lovable-lunkhead shtick still shoot giddy sparks." Claudia Puig of USA Today gave the film three out of four stars, saying "This is the ultimate meta movie. The repetition is exactly the point."

Jocelyn Noveck of the Associated Press gave the film three out of four stars, saying "Hill and Tatum ... have a Laurel-and-Hardy-like implausible chemistry that keeps you laughing pretty much no matter what they're doing." Bill Goodykoontz of The Arizona Republic gave the film four out of five stars, saying "What makes it all work is the chemistry between Hill and Tatum, which in turn, of course, is a rich source of the film's humor." Michael Phillips of the Chicago Tribune gave the film three out of four stars, saying "The peculiar sweetness of 21 Jump Street has taken a hiatus in 22 Jump Street, a brazen sequel that's both slightly disappointing and a reliable, often riotous 'laffer' in the old Variety trade-magazine parlance." Peter Travers of Rolling Stone gave the film three out of four stars, saying "22 Jump Street is damn funny, sometimes outrageously so. It laughs at its own dumb logic and invites us in on the fun." Joe Neumaier of the New York Daily News gave the film three out of four stars, saying "Like its stars, Jump Street gets extra credit for getting by on charm while sticking to the rules." Ian Buckwalter of NPR gave the film a seven out of ten, saying "What separates 22 Jump Street from sequel mediocrity is that everyone's in on the joke."

Sean Fitz-Gerald of The Denver Post gave the film three out of four stars, saying "Jump Street knows you know about the predictability and cheapness of sequels and rip-offs – and in this case, to avoid the downfalls of other summer comedy sagas, embracing that problem might have been the best move for this absurd, unique franchise." Betsy Sharkey of the Los Angeles Times gave the film a positive review, saying "This sequel's spoof of its predecessor's riff on the original 1980s-era buddy-cop TV show coalesces into a raucous, raunchy, irreverent, imperfect riot." Ty Burr of The Boston Globe gave the film three and a half stars out of four, saying "Lord and Miller are on a roll, and there may be no better moviemakers at playing to our modern need for irony – at giving us the entertainment we crave while acknowledging our distrust of it." Rene Rodriguez of the Miami Herald gave the film three out of four stars, saying "There's something going on at the edges of the frame in practically every scene of 22 Jump Street, a testament to the care and attention to detail directors Lord and Miller bring to this potentially silly material." Stephen Whitty of the Newark Star-Ledger gave the film two and a half stars out of four, saying "At what point is sarcasm just a cheap substitute for wit? Exactly when does joking about how all sequels are just lame, repetitive cash-grabs start to suggest that maybe yours is, too? Actually, in this case, about 40 minutes in." Bill Zwecker of the Chicago Sun-Times gave the film three out of four stars, saying "Though I enjoyed enormously this latest offering in the rebooted Jump franchise, it's the effortless, unexpected bromance/partnership between the two unlikely undercover cops is what makes this franchise work."

James Berardinelli of ReelViews gave the film two and a half stars out of four, saying "There are times when 22 Jump Street is borderline brilliant. Unfortunately, those instances are outnumbered by segments that don't work for one reason or another." Jaime N. Christley of Slant Magazine gave the film two out of four stars, saying "As funny and batshit insane as the movie often is, the fact that 22 Jump Street knows it's a tiresome sequel doesn't save it from being a tiresome sequel, even as Lord and Miller struggle to conceal the bitter pill of convention in the sweet tapioca pudding of wall-to-wall jokes." Scott Tobias of The Dissolve gave the film three and a half stars out of five, saying "22 Jump Street squeezes every last drop of comic inspiration it can get from Tatum and Hill, as well as the very notion of a sequel to such a superfluous enterprise."

Steve Persall of the Tampa Bay Times gave the film a B, saying "22 Jump Street is a mixed bag of clever spoofery and miscalculated outrageousness. The unveiled homoeroticism of practically all interaction between Jenko and Schmidt is amusing to the point when it isn't." Ann Hornaday of The Washington Post gave the film three out of five stars, saying "This is a sequel that wears its well-worn formula, mocking inside jokes and gleeful taste for overkill proudly, flying the high-lowbrow flag for audiences that like their comedy just smart enough to be not-too-dumb." Scott Foundas of Variety gave the film a positive review, saying "22 Jump Street hits far more often than it misses, and even when it misses by a mile, the effort is so delightfully zany that it's hard not to give Lord and Miller an 'A' for effort."

Peter Howell of the Toronto Star gave the film three out of four stars, saying "If it seemed Channing Tatum and Jonah Hill couldn't possibly exceed their over-the-top buddy cop antics of 21 Jump Street, you lost that bet." Tom Long of The Detroit News gave the film a B−, saying "There's no real reason 22 Jump Street should work. Yet it does." Joe Williams of the St. Louis Post-Dispatch gave the film three out of four stars, saying "A self-aware sequel has to hop over hurdles to keep from swallowing its own tail, but the sharp writing and tag-team antics lift 22 Jump Street to a high level." Mick LaSalle of the San Francisco Chronicle gave the film three out of four stars, saying "22 Jump Street is exactly what comedy is today. It's coarse, free-flowing and playful." In 2016, James Charisma of Playboy ranked the film #13 on a list of 15 Sequels That Are Way Better Than The Originals.

=== Home media ===
22 Jump Street was released on DVD and Blu-ray on November 18, 2014, by Sony Pictures Home Entertainment.

== Future ==
On September 10, 2014, 23 Jump Street was confirmed. Channing Tatum had yet to sign on to the project, stating, "I don't know if that joke works three times, so we'll see." On August 7, 2015, it was revealed that Lord and Miller would not direct the film, but instead write and produce. A first draft of the film's script has been completed. On December 10, 2014, it was revealed that Sony was planning a crossover between Men in Black and Jump Street. The news was leaked after Sony's system was hacked and then confirmed by the directors of the films, Lord and Miller, during an interview about it. James Bobin was announced as the director in March 2016. The title of the crossover was later revealed as MIB 23, and it was revealed that the crossover would replace a 23 Jump Street film but the idea for the film was later dropped.

In early 2015, a female-driven 21 Jump Street film was rumored to also be in the works. In December 2016, Rodney Rothman was confirmed to write and direct the film. In December 2018, Tiffany Haddish was confirmed to lead the film and Awkwafina is in talks. This idea has also yet to come to fruition.

On June 24, 2024, Tatum stated that 23 Jump Street had "the best script I've ever read for a third movie," and that he "would love to do it with Jonah, and I know Jonah wants to do it too." On October 10, 2025, Tatum reiterated this and elaborated that the project's stalling has been because of oversized budgets and producer fees, expressing his doubts it will ever happen because of the costs involving all the producers that would cost more than the actual film. He noted that he, Hill, Lord and Miller have agreed to smaller producer fees as a solution, but Neal H. Moritz's producer compensation keeps making the project unworkable.

On June 10, 2026, Variety reported that a new film, 24 Jump Street, was in the works with Jonah Hill, Tatum, and Ice Cube in talks to return as actors, and Phil Lord, Chris Miller, and Neal H. Moritz set to return as producers. The film will be directed by Rodney Rothman and written by Rothman, Hill, and Meghan Malloy. The film is set to be released in theatres on December 10, 2027.
