= 21 Jump Street (film) =

2012 film by Phil Lord and Christopher Miller

- Theatrical release poster
- Directed by: Phil Lord; Christopher Miller
- Screenplay by: Michael Bacall
- Story by: Michael Bacall; Jonah Hill
- Based on: 21 Jump Street by Patrick Hasburgh; Stephen J. Cannell
- Produced by: Neal H. Moritz; Stephen J. Cannell (Note: Cannell died in September 2010; he received a posthumous credit in the film.)
- Starring: Jonah Hill; Channing Tatum; Brie Larson; Dave Franco; Rob Riggle; Ice Cube
- Cinematography: Barry Peterson
- Edited by: Joel Negron
- Music by: Mark Mothersbaugh
- Production companies: Columbia Pictures; Metro-Goldwyn-Mayer Pictures; Relativity Media; Original Film; SJC Studios
- Distributed by: Sony Pictures Releasing
- Release dates: March 12, 2012 (SXSW); March 16, 2012 (United States)
- Running time: 109 minutes
- Country: United States
- Language: English
- Budget: $42–54.7 million
- Box office: $201.6 million

21 Jump Street is a 2012 American action comedy film directed by Phil Lord and Christopher Miller in their live-action directorial debuts and written by Michael Bacall, based on a story by Bacall and Jonah Hill. It is the first film in the Jump Street franchise and stars Hill and Channing Tatum in the lead roles, alongside Brie Larson, Dave Franco, Rob Riggle, and Ice Cube. It is an adaptation of the 1987–1991 television series of the same name by Stephen J. Cannell and Patrick Hasburgh. In the film, police officers Schmidt and Jenko are forced to relive high school when they are assigned to prevent the outbreak of a new synthetic drug and arrest the supplier.

21 Jump Street was produced by Columbia Pictures, Metro-Goldwyn-Mayer Pictures, Relativity Media, Original Film, and SJC Studios. It premiered in SXSW festival on March 12, 2012, and was theatrically released in the United States four days later on March 16 by Sony Pictures Releasing where the film received positive reviews from critics, with praise for its humor and the chemistry between Hill and Tatum, and then grossing $201 million worldwide. A sequel, 22 Jump Street, was released on June 13, 2014.

== Plot ==
In 2005, unpopular-yet-scholarly student Morton Schmidt and popular-yet-underachieving athlete Greg Jenko miss their school prom, Schmidt being rejected by the girl he was trying to ask to be his date and Jenko being barred from attending due to failing grades. Seven years later, the duo meet again at the police academy and become friends. After graduating, the two become partners assigned to bicycle patrol at the local park. They catch a break when they arrest Domingo, the leader of a one-percenter motorcycle gang for drug possession, but are forced to release him after they fail to read him his Miranda rights.

The duo is reassigned to 21 Jump Street, a revived undercover program from the 1980s, which specializes in infiltrating high schools. Captain Dickson assigns them to contain the spread of a newly-made synthetic drug called HFS ("Holy Fucking Shit") at Sagan High School. He gives them new identities and enrolls them as students, giving them class schedules fitting their previous academic performances; Jenko taking mostly arts and humanities, and Schmidt taking mostly science classes, but the duo mix up their identities. Schmidt gets a lead on HFS from classmate Molly, and he and Jenko meet the school's main dealer, popular student Eric. The two take HFS in front of him to maintain their cover, and then rush to the bathroom and attempt to vomit the HFS out of their systems, but are unsuccessful.

Eric takes a liking to Schmidt, who develops a romantic interest in Molly. Jenko becomes friends with the students in his AP Chemistry class and finds himself becoming more interested in geeky hobbies and academic pursuits. Schmidt and Jenko throw a party at Schmidt's parents' house, where they are living during the course of their assignment, and invite Eric. During the party, a fight breaks out between Schmidt, Jenko, and some party crashers from another high school. Schmidt wins the fight, impressing Eric and gaining his trust. Jenko's friends hack Eric's phone to enable them to listen in on his conversations.

The phone hack reveals information about an upcoming meeting between Eric and his supplier. Jenko happens to overhear conversations between Schmidt and Eric, where he catches Schmidt making disparaging comments about him. A rift between the duo grows and their official police work suffers. Schmidt and Jenko later track Eric to a cash transaction with the distributors of HFS—the motorcycle gang from the park—and a chase ensues on the freeway. They return to school, argue, and eventually begin fighting, which disrupts the school play. They are expelled from school and fired from the Jump Street program.

Eric, stressed and terrified, recruits Schmidt and Jenko as security for a deal taking place at the school prom. While dressing for the prom, Schmidt and Jenko rekindle their friendship. At the prom, Schmidt is forced to reveal his identity as a cop, upsetting Molly. When they go to the penthouse, they discover that the supplier is the physical education teacher, Mr. Walters, who created the drug accidentally and started selling it to the students to supplement his teacher's salary and pay alimony to his ex-wife. Having caught Eric smoking marijuana, he was able to persuade him to be his dealer.

The motorcycle gang arrives for the deal, but Molly, high on HFS, interrupts them and starts arguing with Schmidt, outing him as a police officer. As a result, gang leader Domingo recognizes Schmidt and Jenko and orders his men to kill them. Two of the gang members then reveal themselves to be undercover DEA agents Tom Hanson and Doug Penhall, former members of the Jump Street program. In an ensuing exchange of gunfire, Hanson and Penhall are both mortally wounded. Mr. Walters and Eric escape with the money and Molly as a hostage; the gang, Schmidt, and Jenko follow close behind. Jenko creates a homemade bomb and uses it to kill the gang. Mr. Walters shoots at Schmidt but Jenko takes the bullet to his arm, sparing Schmidt's life. In response, Schmidt shoots Mr. Walters, unintentionally severing his penis. They arrest Mr. Walters and Eric, successfully reading the former his Miranda rights. Schmidt and Molly share a kiss while Eric and Mr. Walters get arrested.

Both officers are congratulated and reinstated in the Jump Street program as Dickson gives them a new assignment: infiltrating a college.

== Cast ==
- Jonah Hill as Morton Schmidt, a socially awkward but smart police officer
- Channing Tatum as Greg Jenko, a slow-witted but handsome and athletic cop
- Brie Larson as Molly Tracey, one of Eric's friends and Morton's love interest
- Dave Franco as Eric Molson, a student who is one of the HFS dealers
- Rob Riggle as Mr. Walters, a physical education teacher
- DeRay Davis as Domingo, the leader of the One-Percenters
- Ice Cube as Captain Dickson, a coarse police captain who manages 21 Jump Street
- Dax Flame as Zack, a nerd who befriends Greg.
- Chris Parnell as Mr. Gordon, a drama teacher
- Ellie Kemper as Ms. Griggs, a science teacher who has a sexual interest towards Greg and is unaware that he is a cop
- Jake Johnson as Principal Dadier, the principal of Sagan High
- Nick Offerman as Deputy Chief Hardy, Morton and Greg's former boss at the precinct
- Holly Robinson Peete as Officer Judy Hoffs
- Johnny Pemberton as Delroy
- Stanley Wong as Roman
- Justin Hires as Juario
- Brett Lapeyrouse as Amir
- Lindsey Broad as Lisa
- Caroline Aaron as Annie Schmidt, Morton's mother
- Joe Chrest as David Schmidt, Morton's father
- Geraldine Singer as Phyllis
- Dakota Johnson as Fugazy
- Rye Rye as Jr. Jr.
- Valerie Tian as Burns
- Jaren Mitchell as Sanders
- Johnny Simmons as Billiam Willingham, a Sagan High student who died due to HFS
- Spencer Boldman as French Samuels
- Luis Da Silva as One-Percenter #3
- Johnny Depp (uncredited cameo) as Tom Hanson
- Peter DeLuise (uncredited cameo) as Doug Penhall

== Production ==
In May 2008, Sony Pictures confirmed that a film adaptation of the series was under development. Jonah Hill rewrote an existing script by screenwriter Joe Gazzam and executive produced the film, as well as starred in the film. Hill has said he wanted horror director Rob Zombie to direct the picture. In May 2009, Hill described the film adaptation as being an "R-rated, insane, Bad Boys-meets-John Hughes-type movie". On December 21, 2009, it was announced that Sony was in talks with Cloudy with a Chance of Meatballs directing duo, Phil Lord and Christopher Miller, to direct the film. The film follows the same continuity as the television series; Lord said, "So, all of those events of the original happened. And now here we are 20 years later, and we're watching it happen to different people." However, the film features a highly comedic tone, departing radically from the more dramatic and earnest tone of the series.

=== Filming ===
The film was shot in and around New Orleans from April to June 2011, although the filmmakers took elaborate steps to disguise the location as a generic city named "Metropolitan City". They replaced distinctive street signs with signs using a Helvetica typeface, digitally removed billboards from local businesses (except the recognizable local RTA signs toward the end of the film as well as a Zatarain's billboard ad), and avoided filming locations with iconic New Orleans imagery. Despite this, signature landmarks such as the Crescent City Connection and distinctive French Quarter–area street are still partially visible. The main school used as the stand-in for the fictional Sagan High School was Riverdale High School, located in Jefferson, Louisiana. The naked baby pictures of Hill's character used in the film were actual pictures of Hill as a child. The band scene was filmed at Belle Chasse High School in Belle Chasse, Louisiana. Filming was completed as of July 2011.

=== Music ===
The score for the film was composed by Mark Mothersbaugh. In September 2014, it was released by La-La Land Records on a double disc album, limited to 2,000 copies. The second disc of the album also contains the score from the film's sequel, 22 Jump Street, composed by Mothersbaugh as well. A modernized cover of the original television's theme song by Rye Rye (who had a small part in the film) and Esthero was released as a single in the iTunes Store.

In addition, a total of 21 songs were licensed for use in the film. The songs featured in the film include:

- "The Real Slim Shady" – Eminem
- "Police and Thieves" – The Clash
- "You Can't Lose" – The Knux
- "Boombox" – Dirt Nasty
- "Caesar" – Ty Segall
- "Helena Beat" – Foster the People
- "So Into You" – Atlanta Rhythm Section
- "Party Rock Anthem" (feat. Lauren Bennett and GoonRock) - LMFAO
- "Straight Outta Compton" – N.W.A
- "Get Me Golden" – Terraplane Sun
- "Swell Window" – Zee Avi
- "Lookin' Fly" (feat. will.i.am) – Murs
- "Rescue Song" – Mr. Little Jeans
- "Graduation (Friends Forever)" – Vitamin C
- "Call the Police" – Ini Kamoze
- "21 Jump Street – Main Theme (From the Motion Picture "21 Jump Street")" – Rye Rye & Esthero
- "21 Jump Street (Main Theme)" – Wallpaper.
- "You Are the Best" – Tim Myers
- "Every Time I See Your Face" – Elon

== Release ==
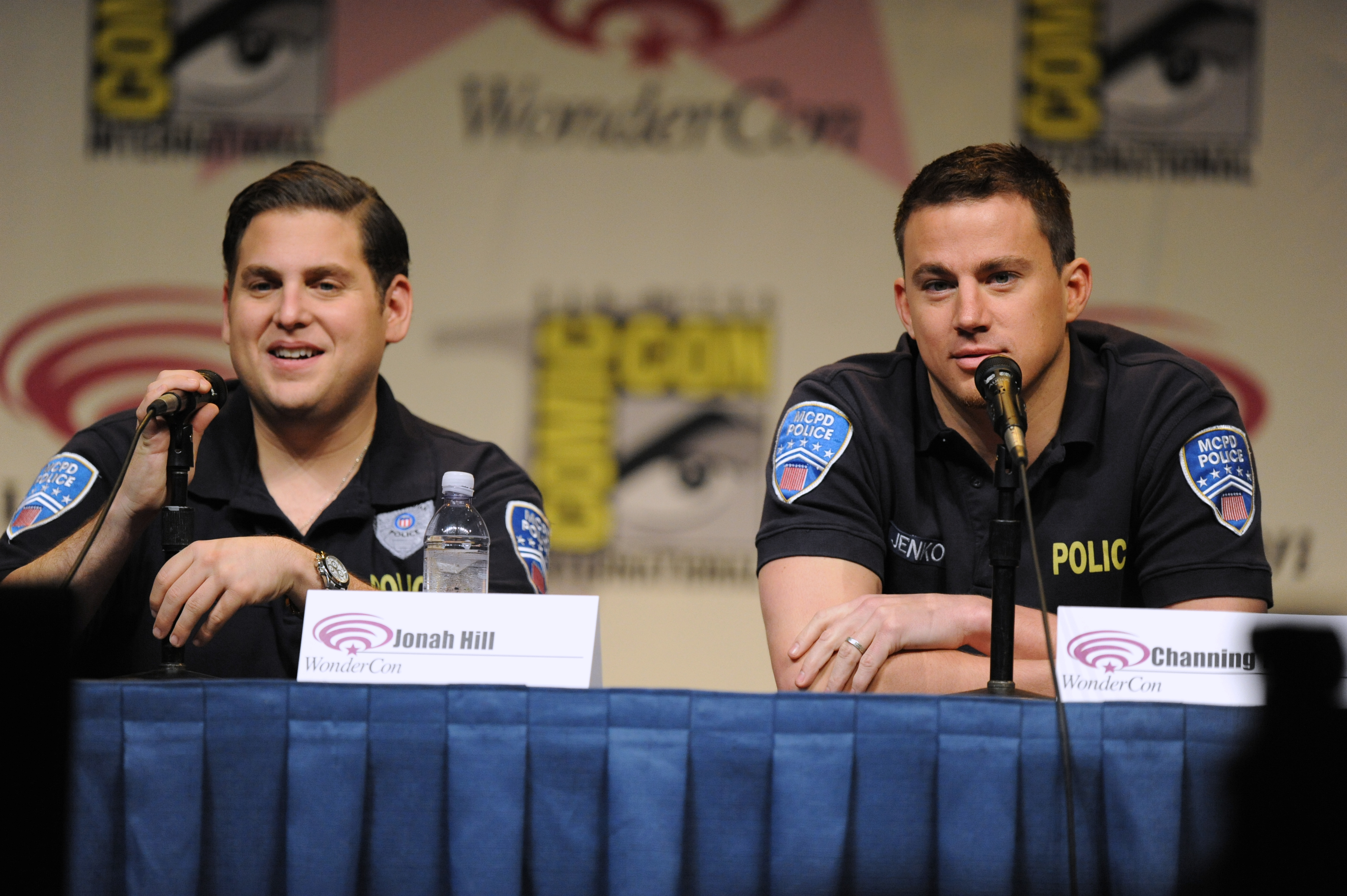
Hill and Tatum promoting the film in costume at WonderCon 2012 in Anaheim, California

The premiere of 21 Jump Street took place on March 12, 2012, at the Paramount Theatre in Austin, Texas, during SXSW. The film opened in a wide release in theaters on March 16, 2012. 21 Jump Street grossed $138.4 million in the United States and Canada and $63.1 million in other countries for a worldwide total of $201.6 million; it is also the top-grossing high school comedy film of all time. The film grossed $13.2 million on its opening day. During the weekend, the film grossed $35 million, taking The Lorax out of the #1 spot that it held for its first two weeks.

21 Jump Street was released on DVD and Blu-ray in Canada and the United States on June 26, 2012 and was released in the United Kingdom on July 9, 2012, by Sony Pictures Home Entertainment. Some of the Blu-ray bonus features include 20 deleted scenes and "Johnny Depp on Set" explaining how they brought Johnny Depp to reprise his role as Tom Hanson. It was revealed that Depp wanted his character to die, but for unknown reasons. In one of the deleted scenes, Tom and his partner, Doug Penhall, were shown to have survived the shootout.

== Reception ==
On Rotten Tomatoes, a review aggregator, 21 Jump Street has an approval rating of 85% based on 224 reviews and an average rating of 7.2/10. The site's critical consensus reads, "A smart, affectionate satire of '80s nostalgia and teen movie tropes, 21 Jump Street offers rowdy mainstream comedy with a surprisingly satisfying bite." On Metacritic, the film has a score of 69 out of 100 based on 41 critics, indicating "generally favorable" reviews. Audiences polled by CinemaScore gave the film an average grade of "B" on an A+ to F scale.

Richard Roeper of The Chicago-Sun Times gave the film a grade of a B+ saying, "I didn't think we needed a 21 Jump Street, but it's actually kind of funny." David Hynes of WhatCulture ranked the script third in a list of the "10 Best Movie Screenplays Since 2010", writing, "A key aspect to the script's success is how it sets up its story with such economy of means. We begin in medias res, and within ten pages establish (in a single shot) [...] all the conflict, interpersonal and personal [...] I groaned when I heard Tatum and Hill had been cast as the lead, but they proved to be a great double-act who did justice to the script's nutty humour."

=== Accolades ===
The film was listed as the number 6 most illegally downloaded film of 2012 using the BitTorrent protocol with approximately 7.6 million downloads.

Year	Award	Category	Recipients	Result	Ref.
2012	BMI Film & TV Awards	Film Music Award	Mark Mothersbaugh	Won	
2012	Golden Trailer Awards	Best Pre-show Theatrical Advertising		Won	
2012	Golden Trailer Awards	Best Comedy TV Spot		Won	
2012	MTV Movie Awards	Best Comedic Performance	Jonah Hill	Nominated	
2012	MTV Movie Awards	Best Hero	Channing Tatum	Nominated	
2012	MTV Movie Awards	Best Cast	Jonah Hill, Channing Tatum, Ice Cube, Dave Franco, Ellie Kemper, Brie Larson, and Rob Riggle	Nominated	
2012	MTV Movie Awards	Best On-Screen Transformation	Johnny Depp	Nominated	
2012	MTV Movie Awards	Best Fight	Channing Tatum and Jonah Hill vs. Kid Gang	Nominated	
2012	MTV Movie Awards	Best Gut-Wrenching Performance	Jonah Hill and Rob Riggle	Nominated	
2012	MTV Movie Awards	Best Music	Party Rock Anthem by LMFAO	Won	
2012	Teen Choice Awards	Choice Movie: Comedy	21 Jump Street	Won	
2012	Teen Choice Awards	Choice Movie: Actor Comedy	Channing Tatum	Won	
2012	Teen Choice Awards	Choice Movie: Actor Comedy	Jonah Hill	Nominated	
2012	Artios Awards	Outstanding Achievement in Casting – Big Budget Comedy Feature	21 Jump Street – Jeanne McCarthy, Nicole Abellera, Elizabeth Coulon, (Location Casting), Yesi Ramirez (Associate)	Nominated	
2012	People's Choice Awards	Favorite Comedy Movie	21 Jump Street	Nominated	
2013	Critics' Choice Awards	Best Comedy	21 Jump Street	Nominated	
2013	Critics' Choice Awards	Best Actor in a Comedy	Channing Tatum	Nominated	

== Sequels and spin-offs ==
=== 22 Jump Street ===
In March 2012, Sony Pictures announced that it was pursuing a sequel to the film, signing a deal that would see Hill and Bacall return to write a script treatment that would be again developed by Bacall. Hill and Tatum returned to star in the film. They were executive producers as well, alongside producer Neal H. Moritz. Phil Lord and Christopher Miller returned to direct this sequel. The film was originally scheduled to be released on June 6, 2014. In May 2013, it was announced that the film would be pushed back a week until June 13, 2014. The film's title was 22 Jump Street. Like the first film, 22 Jump Street received positive reviews.

=== 24 Jump Street ===
In September 2013, 23 Jump Street was announced to be in development. Commenting on the project, Tatum stated, "I don't know if that joke works three times, so we'll see."

On June 10, 2026, Variety reported that a new movie, 24 Jump Street, was in the works with Jonah Hill, Channing Tatum, and Ice Cube in talks to return as actors, and Phil Lord, Chris Miller, and Neal H. Moritz set to return as producers. The movie will be directed by Rodney Rothman and written by Rothman, Hill, and Meghan Malloy.

=== Cancelled Men in Black crossover film ===
On December 10, 2014, it was revealed that Sony was planning a crossover between Men in Black and Jump Street. The news was leaked after Sony's system was hacked and then confirmed by the directors of the films, Chris Miller and Phil Lord, during an interview about it. In March 2016, James Bobin signed on as director. In 2019, it was confirmed by producer Walter Parkes that MIB 23 had been cancelled.

=== Other spin-offs ===
In April 2015, a female-centered Jump Street film was announced to be in development. In December 2016, Rodney Rothman was signed on as writer/director. In December 2018, Tiffany Haddish was cast as the main star, while Zendaya and Awkwafina were also in negotiations for roles. By November 2020, it was revealed that Wendy Molyneux and Lizzie Molyneux-Logelin had completed a draft of the script, while the official title was announced to be Jump Street: Now for Her Pleasure. In July 2023, a spin-off Jump Street film featuring Molly Tracey was announced to be in development with Brie Larson planning to return.
