= Trouble Bound =

- Film poster
- Directed by: Jeffrey Reiner
- Written by: Darrell Fetty; Francis Delia
- Starring: Patricia Arquette; Billy Bob Thornton; Michael Madsen; Sal Jenco
- Distributed by: ITC Entertainment
- Release date: 1993
- Country: United States
- Language: English

Trouble Bound is a 1993 crime comedy-drama film directed by Jeffrey Reiner, and starring Patricia Arquette, Billy Bob Thornton, Michael Madsen, and Sal Jenco. The plot concerns an ex-convict who goes on the run with a woman. Unbeknownst to the ex-convict and the woman, a dead body is in the trunk of the Lincoln in which they are riding. Meanwhile, a mafia kingpin's daughter is trying to kill the hitman who killed her father.

== Cast ==
- Michael Madsen as Harry Talbot
- Patricia Arquette as Kit Califano
- Florence Stanley as Grandma Martucci
- Sal Jenco as Danny
- Billy Bob Thornton as "Coldface"
- Ginger Lynn Allen as Girl In Porn Movie On TV

== Reception ==
Trouble Bound received mixed review from film critics. On review aggregator Rotten Tomatoes, the film has 46% critical approval.
