= Bill Nuss =

American screenwriter

- Born: William M. Nuss; March 29, 1964 (age 62); New York City, New York, U.S.
- Occupations: Writer, producer
- Years active: 1986–present
- Spouse: Bonnie Geller Nuss (2 children)

Bill Nuss is a TV writer and producer, who also writes for feature films and Broadway. He is President of Confidential Pictures, a Los Angeles-based production company that supplies primetime series to network, cable and streamers. With the late Dusty Kay (Entourage), he has written the book for The Honeymooners, a Broadway-bound musical based on the classic CBS television series.

Nuss has produced, written or created over 300 hours of network primetime series. In addition to Hawaii Five-0 and NCIS, he worked with his mentor, Stephen J. Cannell, on Fox's first hit 21 Jump Street, starring Johnny Depp. Other Cannell series include Renegade starring Lorenzo Lamas, Booker, The A-Team, Riptide as well as the NBC TV movie Hunter: Everyone Walks in L.A. starring Fred Dryer and Miguel Ferrer. He has also written and developed pilots for NBC, CBS, Fox, and USA Network, directed episodic television, and has had cameos in several series.

As an independent producer, Nuss negotiated Side-Letter Agreements with the Directors Guild of America, the Teamsters and IATSE. His company, Confidential Pictures, produced North Shore for 20th Century Fox where he was involved in changing the production rebates in the state of Hawaii. On the creative side of the table, he is a member of the Writers Guild, the Directors Guild, the Screen Actors Guild, the Dramatists Guild, and Actors' Equity Association. He is also an active WGA Credits Arbitrator.

Nuss was the creator and Executive Producer of Pacific Blue, USA Network's highest rated drama series during its reign. The series reached one hundred and one episodes and is currently available on Amazon, Peacock, Tubi, Pluto, Plex, Roku, and on DVD.

An avid tournament poker player, Nuss created and produced The Real Deal, the world's first live interactive poker show, staged at the Venetian Resort and Casino in Las Vegas. The show featured poker stars Doyle Brunson, Phil Hellmuth, Daniel Negreanu, Antonio Esfandiari, Phil Laak, and Scotty Nguyen.

As the youngest executive in the history of NBC, Nuss worked with legendary programmer Brandon Tartikoff, in developing Hill Street Blues, Fame, and St. Elsewhere.

Originally from New York and Atlanta, Bill Nuss graduated from Northwestern University where he developed the long running (50 years) improvisational comedy review, The Mee-Ow Show that later spawned many writers, directors and actors including Julia Louis-Dreyfus, Ana Gasteyer, Dermut Mulroney, and Seth Meyers. He was on the Board of Brentwood Country and served as President from 2018 to 2021. Bill is married to Bonnie Geller Nuss and lives in Brentwood, CA with their two daughters.

== Credits ==
FILM

"Officer Woody, AI"

"Lucky Dog"

"Three Blind Mice"

"Wedding Bell Blues"

=== TV ===
==== Writer/producer ====
- The Real Deal – Producer – Venetian, Las Vegas (2008)
- North Shore – Producer (21 eps) – Confidential/20th/Fox (2004–2005)
- Pacific Blue – Creator/Exec. Producer (101 eps) – North Hall Productions/USA Network (1995–2002)
- Renegade – Exec. Producer (44 eps) – Cannell/Synd. (1993–1995)
- Return of Hunter – Exec. Producer – MOW – Cannell/NBC (1994)
- Greyhounds – Exec. Producer – MOW – Cannell/CBS (1994)
- The Hat Squad – Exec. Producer (12 eps) – Cannell/CBS (1993)
- Raven – Co-Exec. Producer (7 eps) – Columbia/CBS (1992)
- NYPD Mounted – Exec. Producer – MOW – Orion (1991)
- Booker – Exec. Producer (18 eps) – Cannell/Fox (1989–1990)
- 21 Jump Street – Exec. Prod./Supv. Prod./Prod. (81 eps) – Cannell/Fox (1987–1990)
- The A-Team – Story Editor (28 eps) – Cannell/NBC (1985–1986)

==== Writer ====
===== Pilots/MOWs =====
Ace Ballard

Grinders

- Shanghai – Fox 21
- Gamble – Fox 21
- Stevi Faith
- The Fixer – ESPN
- Vegas High – Fox
- The Return of Hunter – Cannell/NBC
- Carrick O'Quinn – Cannell/CBS

===== Series =====
- NCIS (1) – CBS Productions/CBS
- Hawaii Five-0 (1) – CBS Productions/CBS
- Pacific Blue (9) – North Hall Productions/USA Network
- Renegade (11) – Cannell/Synd.
- The Hat Squad (2) – Cannell
- Raven (2) – Columbia/CBS
- 21 Jump Street (14) – Cannell/FBC
- Booker (6) – Cannell/FBC
- The A-Team (9) – Cannell/NBC
- Riptide – Cannell/NBC

=== Theatre ===
- The Honeymooners – Co-Book Writer

=== Director ===
- Renegade

=== Actor ===
- The A-Team
- Raven
- 21 Jump Street

== Awards ==
- NAACP Image Award – (21 Jump Street)
- Asian-American Pacific Award – (21 Jump Street)
- NCCJ Imagen Award – (21 Jump Street)
- California Governor Media Access Award – (21 Jump Street)
- Gold Hugo Award – Chicago Film Festival – (21 Jump Street)
- Scott Newman Foundation Award – (21 Jump Street)

== Education ==
- The Westminster Schools – Atlanta, GA
- Northwestern University – B.S. – Evanston, IL
