= Neal H. Moritz =

American film producer

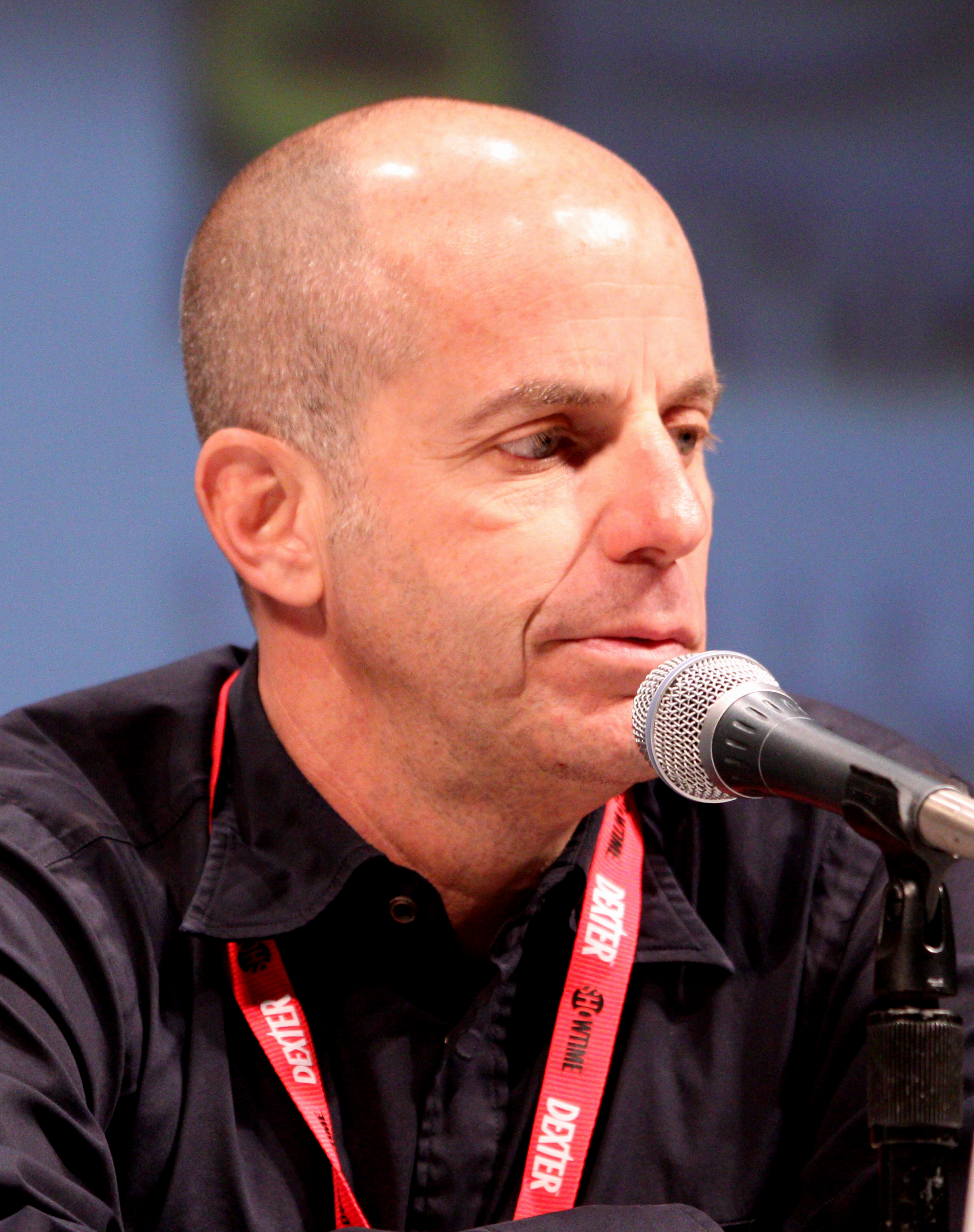
- Moritz at the 2010 San Diego Comic-Con
- Born: June 6, 1959 (age 67); Los Angeles, California, U.S.
- Education: USC School of Cinematic Arts
- Occupation: Film producer
- Spouse: Sarah Trimble Moritz

Neal H. Moritz (born June 6, 1959) is an American film producer and founder of Original Film. He has produced over 70 major motion pictures which have grossed a total of over $14 billion worldwide. He is best known for the Fast & Furious, Jump Street and the Sonic the Hedgehog franchises, as well as the television series Prison Break and Emmy-nominated The Boys. His early credits include I Know What You Did Last Summer, Urban Legend and Cruel Intentions.

== Life ==
Neal H. Moritz was born in Los Angeles, California, to Milton Moritz and Barbara (née Levin). His paternal grandfather, Joseph Moritz, owned movie theaters in Pittsburgh and was an early investor in American International Pictures (AIP). Milton Moritz was born in Pittsburgh and moved to California after falling ill with rheumatic fever at age eight, when his doctor suggested the family move to a better climate. He was head of marketing at AIP and was later CEO and president of the National Association of Theatre Owners of California/Nevada. Moritz is from a Jewish family.

Moritz grew up in Westwood and graduated from UCLA, after attending Semester at Sea. When he came back, he gave away several backpacks that were popular with Chinese students. He had so many requests for the backpacks that he and a friend began a company importing purses and bags from Taiwan. He sold the company to an investor, and returned to school. He earned a master's degree from the Peter Stark Producing Program at the University of Southern California's School of Cinema-Television in 1985. He is a member of the school's Alumni Development Council. As of 2021, Moritz has been married for 20 years and has two children, aged 19 and 16.

== Career ==
Moritz has more than 70 films to his credit, including Juice starring Tupac Shakur, I Know What You Did Last Summer, the first two films of the Urban Legend franchise, Cruel Intentions, The Skulls, the main Fast & Furious franchise, Not Another Teen Movie, the first two films of the XXX film series, being XXX and XXX: State of the Union, S.W.A.T., Evan Almighty, I Am Legend, Made of Honor, Sweet Home Alabama, Total Recall and the Jump Street films, being 21 Jump Street and 22 Jump Street.

More recent credits include the Sonic the Hedgehog franchise, Spenser Confidential, Bloodshot, Escape Room, Goosebumps and Goosebumps 2: Haunted Halloween.

He has also produced the television series The Boys, S.W.A.T., Preacher, Happy, Prison Break, and The Big Break.

In September 2017, Moritz and Original Film signed a first-look deal for Paramount Pictures that began on January 1, 2019, leaving his longtime home, Sony Pictures, after over 20 years. However, he still maintains his overall deal at Sony Pictures Television.

In October 2018, Moritz filed a lawsuit against Universal Pictures in Los Angeles County Superior Court for breach of oral contract and committing promissory fraud after the distributor removed him as lead producer on Hobbs & Shaw. On September 2, 2020, the California Court of Appeal for the Second Appellate District filed a published opinion affirming the trial court's denial of Universal's motion to compel arbitration of Moritz's claims. On September 10, 2020, it was reported that the parties had reached an amicable settlement. Moritz went on to receive producer credit for the 2021 film F9 and the 2023 film Fast X.

== Filmography ==
=== Film ===
==== NBCUniversal ====
Year	Title	Director	Notes
2000	The Skulls	Rob Cohen	Under Universal Pictures
2001	The Fast and the Furious	Rob Cohen	Under Universal Pictures
2003	2 Fast 2 Furious	John Singleton	Under Universal Pictures
2006	The Fast and the Furious: Tokyo Drift	Justin Lin	Under Universal Pictures
2007	Evan Almighty	Tom Shadyac	Under Universal Pictures
2009	Fast & Furious	Justin Lin	Under Universal Pictures
2011	Fast Five	Justin Lin	Under Universal Pictures
2011	The Change-Up	David Dobkin	Under Universal Pictures
2013	Fast & Furious 6	Justin Lin	Under Universal Pictures
2013	R.I.P.D.	Robert Schwentke	Under Universal Pictures
2014	Search Party	Scot Armstrong	Under Focus World
2015	Furious 7	James Wan	Under Universal Pictures
2017	The Fate of the Furious	F. Gary Gray	Under Universal Pictures
2021	F9	Justin Lin	Under Universal Pictures
2023	Fast X	Louis Leterrier	Under Universal Pictures
2028	Fast Forever	Louis Leterrier	Under Universal Pictures

==== Sony Pictures ====
Year	Title	Director	Notes
1997	I Know What You Did Last Summer	Jim Gillespie	Under Columbia Pictures
1998	I Still Know What You Did Last Summer	Danny Cannon	Under Columbia Pictures
1998	Urban Legend	Jamie Blanks	Under TriStar Pictures
1999	Cruel Intentions	Roger Kumble	Under Columbia Pictures
1999	Blue Streak	Les Mayfield	Under Columbia Pictures
2000	Urban Legends: Final Cut	John Ottman	Under Columbia Pictures
2001	Saving Silverman	Dennis Dugan	Under Columbia Pictures
2001	The Glass House	Daniel Sackheim	Under Columbia Pictures
2001	Not Another Teen Movie	Joel Gallen	Under Columbia Pictures
2002	Slackers	Dewey Nicks	Under Screen Gems
2002	XXX	Rob Cohen	Under Columbia Pictures
2003	S.W.A.T.	Clark Johnson	Under Columbia Pictures
2005	XXX: State of the Union	Lee Tamahori	Under Columbia Pictures
2005	Stealth	Rob Cohen	Under Columbia Pictures
2006	Click	Frank Coraci	Under Columbia Pictures
2006	Gridiron Gang	Phil Joanou	Under Columbia Pictures
2008	Vantage Point	Pete Travis	Under Columbia Pictures
2008	Made of Honor	Paul Weiland	Under Columbia Pictures
2008	Prom Night	Nelson McCormick	Under Screen Gems
2010	The Bounty Hunter	Andy Tennant	Under Columbia Pictures
2011	The Green Hornet	Michel Gondry	Under Columbia Pictures
2011	Battle: Los Angeles	Jonathan Liebesman	Under Columbia Pictures
2012	21 Jump Street	Phil Lord and Christopher Miller	Under Columbia Pictures
2012	Total Recall	Len Wiseman	Under Columbia Pictures
2014	22 Jump Street	Phil Lord and Christopher Miller	Under Columbia Pictures
2015	Goosebumps	Rob Letterman	Under Columbia Pictures and Sony Pictures Animation
2016	Passengers	Morten Tyldum	Under Columbia Pictures
2018	Goosebumps 2: Haunted Halloween	Ari Sandel	Under Columbia Pictures and Sony Pictures Animation
2019	Escape Room	Adam Robitel	Under Columbia Pictures
2020	Bloodshot	David S. F. Wilson	Under Columbia Pictures
2021	Escape Room: Tournament of Champions	Adam Robitel	Under Columbia Pictures
2025	I Know What You Did Last Summer	Jennifer Kaytin Robinson	Under Columbia Pictures

==== Paramount Pictures ====
Year	Title	Director
1992	Juice	Ernest R. Dickerson
2020	Sonic the Hedgehog	Jeff Fowler
2022	Sonic the Hedgehog 2	Jeff Fowler
2024	Sonic the Hedgehog 3	Jeff Fowler
2026	Scary Movie	Michael Tiddes
2027	Sonic the Hedgehog 4	Jeff Fowler

==== Lionsgate ====
Year	Title	Director	Notes
1994	The Stoned Age	James Melkonian	Under Trimark Pictures
1999	Held Up	Steve Rash	Under Trimark Pictures
2001	Soul Survivors	Stephen Carpenter	Under Artisan Entertainment
2011	The Music Never Stopped	Jim Kohlberg	Under Lionsgate Films and Roadside Attractions
2018	Hunter Killer	Donovan Marsh	Under Lionsgate Films and Summit Premiere

==== The Walt Disney Studios ====
Year	Title	Director	Notes
1997	Volcano	Mick Jackson	Under 20th Century Fox
2002	Sweet Home Alabama	Andy Tennant	Under Touchstone Pictures
2019	The Art of Racing in the Rain	Simon Curtis	Under 20th Century Fox
2022	The Princess	Le-Van Kiet	Under 20th Century Studios and Hulu
2027	Beach Read	Yulin Kuang	Under 20th Century Studios

==== Warner Bros. Pictures ====
Year	Title	Director	Notes
2004	Torque	Joseph Kahn	
2007	I Am Legend	Francis Lawrence	
2013	Jack the Giant Slayer	Bryan Singer	Under Warner Bros. and New Line Cinema

==== Other studios ====
Year	Film	Director	Studio
2003	Out of Time	Carl Franklin	MGM Distribution Co.
2013	Dead Man Down	Niels Arden Oplev	FilmDistrict
2020	Spenser Confidential	Peter Berg	Netflix
2025	Afterburn	J.J. Perry	Inaugural Entertainment
2027	Cliffhanger	Jaume Collet-Serra	Decal / Row K Entertainment
TBA	Highlander	Chad Stahelski	Amazon MGM Studios

==== Direct-to-video ====
- Cruel Intentions 2 (2000)
- The Skulls II (2002) (Executive producer)
- The Skulls III (2004)
- Cruel Intentions 3 (2004)
- Devour (2005)
- I'll Always Know What You Did Last Summer (2006)
- S.W.A.T.: Firefight (2011)
- S.W.A.T.: Under Siege (2017)

=== Television ===
All works, he was executive producer unless otherwise noted

- Shasta McNasty (1999)
- Still Life (2003)
- Greg the Bunny (2002–04)
- Tru Calling (2003–05)
- Point Pleasant (2005–06)
- The Big C (2010–13)
- Save Me (2013)
- Prison Break (2005–17)
- Happy! (2017–19)
- The Boys (2019–26)
- Fast & Furious Spy Racers (2019–21)
- Preacher (2016–19)
- S.W.A.T. (2017–25)
- I Know What You Did Last Summer (2021)
- The Boys Presents: Diabolical (2022)
- Gen V (2023–25)
- Goosebumps (2023–25)
- Knuckles (2024)
- Cruel Intentions (2024)
- Long Bright River (2025)
- S.W.A.T. Exiles (Upcoming)
- Vought Rising (Upcoming)

Pilots

- Mr. Ed (2004)
- Untitled Dave Caplan pilot (2008)
- Cruel Intentions (2016)
- Roadside Picnic (2017)

TV movies

- Framed (1990)
- Blind Justice (1994)
- The Rat Pack (1998)
- Monster! (1999)
- Cabin by the Lake (2000)
- Hendrix (2000)
- Electra's Guy (2000)
- Class Warfare (2001)
- Return to Cabin by the Lake (2001)
- Shotgun Love Dolls (2001)
- The Pool at Maddy Breaker's (2003)
- Vegas Dick (2003)
- Not Another High School Show (2007)
- SIS (2008)
- Prison Break: The Final Break (2009)

=== Other credits ===
Acting roles

Year	Title	Role
2001	The Fast and the Furious	Ferrari Driver
2003	2 Fast 2 Furious	Swerving Cop
2003	S.W.A.T.	Luxury Car Driver

Special thanks

- My Trip to the Dark Side (2011)
