= Ray Walton =

Australian rules footballer

Personal information
- Full name: Ray Walton
- Born: 10 August 1936 (age 90)
- Original team: Maffra
- Height: 185 cm (6 ft 1 in)
- Weight: 83 kg (183 lb)

Playing career^{1}
Years	Club	Games (Goals)
1957–61	St Kilda	47 (1)
- ^{1} Playing statistics correct to the end of 1961.

Ray Walton (born 10 August 1936) is a former Australian rules footballer who played with St Kilda in the Victorian Football League (VFL).
