= Steven Williams =

American actor (born 1949)

- Born: January 7, 1949 (age 77); Memphis, Tennessee, U.S.
- Education: Wendell Phillips High School
- Occupation: Actor
- Years active: 1975–present
- Spouse: Ann Geddes
- Children: 2

Steven Williams (born January 7, 1949) is an American actor in films and television. He is known for his roles as Captain Adam Fuller on 21 Jump Street, NYPD Detective Lt. Jefferson Burnett on The Equalizer, Det. August Brooks on L.A. Heat, X on The X-Files, Russell "Linc" Lincoln in Linc's, and Rufus Turner in Supernatural.

Throughout his career, Williams has appeared in numerous films, including The Blues Brothers (1980), Twilight Zone: The Movie (1983), Jason Goes to Hell: The Final Friday (1993), 22 Jump Street (2014), It (2017), and Birds of Prey (2020).

He has been nominated for a Screen Actors Guild Award and one NAACP Image Award.He starred in Family Business on BET +.

== Early life ==
Williams was born in Memphis, Tennessee, and was predominantly reared in Chicago. His parents were divorced, and he was raised at separate times by his father in Michigan, his mother in Chicago and by his maternal grandparents in Millington, Tennessee. In Chicago, he attended Wendell Phillips High School. After graduating, he matriculated at the General Motors Institute, an automaker's engineering school. Williams later worked as a postal carrier, salesman, and model.

He was drafted into the United States Army, serving in the 2nd Armored Division, stationed in Gelnhausen, Germany and became Divisional Champion with the United States Army Boxing Team, Middleweight Division. Upon receiving an Honorable Discharge from the United States Army, Williams worked for the United States Postal Service as a mailman. After delivering the mail in subzero temperatures, he went to work in Chicago's garment district as an apparel salesman.

== Career ==
Williams made his acting debut in the 1975 film Cooley High. He appeared in musical comedy The Blues Brothers (1980) as Trooper Mount, and played Lt. Jefferson Burnett on the CBS drama series The Equalizer in 1985. He portrayed renegade Capt. David Nester in the 1985 film Missing in Action 2: The Beginning,

He landed the role of Captain Adam Fuller, a senior police officer supervising younger cops, on Fox Network's TV series 21 Jump Street in 1987. Williams replaced Frederic Forrest, who played a similar character, early in the series. He continued playing the character until the series ended in 1991. While acting in the series, Williams played Lieutenant Gallagher in Under the Gun (1988), which featured Vanessa Williams in the cast.

Following his stint on 21 Jump Street, Williams portrayed the title character in The 100 Lives of Black Jack Savage. He played the role of Det. August Brooks on the TNT series L.A. Heat in 1996. He recurred as X on the Fox hit science fiction series The X-Files. He earned a Screen Actors Guild nomination for Outstanding Performance by an Ensemble in a Drama Series in 1997 for his work as X.

Williams appeared as main character Russell "Linc" Lincoln, a bartender, in comedy Linc's. In 2000, he received an NAACP Image Award nomination, in the category of Outstanding Actor in a Comedy Series. Concurrently, Williams portrayed Isaac in short-lived UPN series Legacy.

He portrayed Rufus Turner in fantasy series Supernatural (2008−16), and was Quentin in drama The Chi (2018−present). Williams' work on the latter has been well received, with reviewers finding him "strong" and "powerful" as Quentin. Williams garnered several recurring roles in the 2010s and 2020s, including attorney Stephen Carlisle in Ambitions (2019) and teacher Joe Ridgeway in Locke & Key (2020), both dramas.

Williams has appeared extensively in guest roles on television. He portrayed an Army friend of the protagonist in MacGyver, and was Robin Dumars' father on Hangin' with Mr. Cooper. Other guest appearances include The Dukes of Hazzard, The A-Team, Booker, Stargate SG-1, Martin, Veronica Mars, The Bernie Mac Show, Criminal Minds and iZombie.

Other film roles include a bar patron in Twilight Zone: The Movie (1983), bounty hunter Creighton Duke in horror film Jason Goes to Hell: The Final Friday (1993) and Carlos in Adventures of Power (2009). In TV movies, Williams was a Panamanian boat captain named Mo in Dreams of Gold: The Mel Fisher Story (1986) and portrayed pitcher Satchel Paige in The Court-Martial of Jackie Robinson (1990).

== Personal life ==
He was previously married to talent agent Ann Geddes. He has two daughters and six grandchildren. His eldest granddaughter is an artist based in Chicago and Los Angeles.

== Filmography ==
=== Film ===
Year	Title	Role	Notes
1975	Cooley High	Jimmy Lee	
1976	The Monkey Hustle	Manager	
1978	Big Apple Birthday	More Fairy Tale Folk	Short
1979	Dummy	Julius Lang	TV movie
1980	The Blues Brothers	Trooper Mount	
1981	The Marva Collins Story	McCloud	
1983	Doctor Detroit	Junior Sweet	
1983	Twilight Zone: The Movie	Bar Patron	
1984	The Lost Honor of Kathryn Beck	Les Averback	TV movie
1985	Missing in Action 2: The Beginning	Captain David Nester	
1985	International Airport	Frazier	TV movie
1985	Better Off Dead	Tree Trimmer	
1985	Silent Witness	Ted Gunning	TV movie
1985	House	Cop #4	
1986	Triplecross	Kyle Banks	TV movie
1986	Northstar	National Security Agent #2	TV movie
1986	Dreams of Gold: The Mel Fisher Story	Mo	TV movie
1988	Under the Gun	Gallagher	
1990	The Forbidden Dance	Weed	
1990	The Court-Martial of Jackie Robinson	Satchel Paige	TV movie
1991	The Whereabouts of Jenny	Mick	TV movie
1991	The Heroes of Desert Storm	Jonathan Alston	TV movie
1992	Revolver	Ken Seymour	TV movie
1993	Jason Goes to Hell: The Final Friday	Creighton Duke	
1994	Deep Red	Sergeant Eldon James	TV movie
1994	Corrina, Corrina	Anthony T. Williams	
1995	Legacy of Sin: The William Coit Story	Detective Sexton	TV movie
1995	Bloodfist VII: Manhunt	Captain Doyle	Video
1998	The Sender	Lockwood	
2001	The Elite	McKay	
2001	Firetrap	Firefighter Chief Sheehan	
2001	Seduced by a Thief	Sheehan	
2001	Route 666	Fred 'Rabbit' Smith	
2001	Van Hook	Colonel Jeffries	
2002	L.A. Law: The Movie	Albert Hutchinson	TV movie
2002	Banged Out	-	Video
2003	Dark Wolf	Hartigan	Video
2004	Sexual Life	Jerry's Father	
2004	Guarding Eddy	Jack	
2005	Graves End	Paul Rickman	
2005	Crimson Force	Williams	TV movie
2005	Walker, Texas Ranger: Trial by Fire	Detective Mike Burton	TV movie
2005	Halfway Decent	Cervondo	
2006	Special Ops: Delta Force	Smithers	
2007	Forfeit	-	
2007	Richard III	Lord Stanley	TV movie
2007	Not Another High School Show	Captain Fuller	TV movie
2008	Adventures of Power	Carlos	
2008	Kings of the Evening	Mr. Gamba	TV movie
2009	The Fear Chamber	Captain Bradley	
2011	Breathe	Mr. Burgin	
2011	3 Musketeers	Planchet	Video
2012	Who Killed Soul Glow?	Police Captain	
2012	Christmas Twister	Terry	TV movie
2013	Jack the Giant Slayer	Master of Secrets	
2013	The Call	Terrence (voice)	
2014	Last Curtain Call	George	
2014	22 Jump Street	Captain Adam Fuller	
2014	Cru	Max	
2015	My Favorite Five	Robert Colburn	
2015	Fifty and Over Club	Lawson	TV movie
2016	The Trust	Cliff	
2016	The Stakelander	'Doc' Earl	
2016	Street Credit	Reverend Street	Short
2017	It	Leroy Hanlon	
2018	Glass Jaw	Harry Sterling	
2018	BFA New Orleans	James 'Pops' Blake I	TV movie
2019	Velvet Buzzsaw	VA Janitor	
2020	Emerald Run	Pastor Winfield	
2020	Birds of Prey	Captain Patrick Erickson	
2021	Afterlifetime	Charon the Ferryman	Short
2025	Hearts of Darkness: The Making of the Final Friday	Himself	Documentary film

=== Television ===
Year	Title	Role	Notes
1982–1983	The Dukes of Hazzard	Leeman/Percy	Episode: "Dukes in Danger" & "High Flyin' Dukes"
1983	Wizards and Warriors	Soldier	Episode: "The Kidnap"
1983	Hotel	Protester	Episode: "Confrontations"
1983	Dallas	Bailiff	Episode: "Ray's Trial" & "The Oil Baron's Ball"
1983	Hill Street Blues	Sonny Freeman	Episode: "Moon Over Uranus: The Final Legacy"
1984	Steambath	Chuck Skerrit	Episode: "A Preacher and a Jock"
1984	The A-Team	Eddie Devane	Episode: "Double Heat"
1984	Remington Steele	Lieutenant	Episode: "A Pocketful of Steele"
1984-1985	Hunter	King Hayes/Parker LeMay	Episode: "Hunter" & "The Beach Boy"
1985	The Equalizer	Lt. Jefferson Burnett	6 episodes "The Equalizer" (S1.E1 Pilot) "China Rain" (S1.E2) "The Defector" (S1.E3) "Lady Cop" (S1.E5) "The Confirmation Day" (S1.E6) "Mama's Boy" (S1.E9)
1986	MacGyver	Charlie Robinson	Episode: "Countdown"
1986	Gimme a Break!	Harvey	Episode: "Getting to Know You"
1987	Stingray	Tommy Miller, "The Greeter"	Episode: "The Greeter"
1987	227	Billy Bob	Episode: "Got a Job"
1987	Hill Street Blues	Johnson	Episode: "The Cookie Crumbles"
1987	L.A. Law	Detective Sgt. Phipps	Episode: "Oy Vey! Wilderness!"
1987–1991	21 Jump Street	Captain Adam Fuller	Main cast
1989	Wiseguy	Jail Inmate	Episode: "The One That Got Away"
1989–1990	Booker	Captain Adam Fuller	Recurring cast
1991	The 100 Lives of Black Jack Savage	Jack 'Black Jack' Savage	Main cast
1991	L.A. Law	Joshua Merrill	Episode: "Spleen It to Me, Lucy"
1992	In Living Color	-	Episode: "George Bush Meets Tommy Wu"
1992	Civil Wars	Victor	Episode: "Das Boat House"
1993	Hangin' with Mr. Cooper	Chip Dumars	Episode: "Unforgettable"
1993	Street Justice	Tyson	Episode: "Countdown"
1994	seaQuest DSV	The President of The USA	Episode: "Better Than Martians"
1994	Martin	Simon	Episode: "I Don't Have the Heart"
1994	Models Inc.	Marcus Ballard	Episode: "Skin Deep" & "Old Models Never Die"
1994	Dr. Quinn, Medicine Woman	Captain	Episode: "The Washington Affair: Part 1 & 2"
1994	Diagnosis: Murder	Butch Reilly	Episode: "Standing Eight Count"
1994	Renegade	Danny	Episode: "South of 98"
1994–2002	The X-Files	Mr. X	Recurring cast: season 2–3, guest: season 4–5 & 9
1995	University Hospital	John Jenkins	Episode: "Til Death Do Us Part"
1995	Sister, Sister	Gregg	Episode: "The Twins Get Fired"
1995	NYPD Blue	Lt. Nathan Stackhouse	Episode: "E.R."
1996	Renegade	Major Peter Flood	Episode: "Hard Evidence"
1998	Suddenly Susan	Carl	Episode: "A Tale of Two Pants: Part 2"
1998–1999	Legacy	Isaac Peters	Recurring cast
1998–2000	Linc's	Russell 'Linc' Lincoln	Main cast
1999	Total Recall 2070	Jonas Brack	Episode: "Assessment"
1999	L.A. Heat	Detective August Brooks	Main cast
1999	Any Day Now	Percy Tucker	Episode: "Heads or Tails"
2000	City of Angels	Emerill Jordan	Episode: "Cry Me a Liver"
2000–2003	Stargate SG-1	General Maurice Vidrine	Recurring cast: season 4 & 7
2001	The Hughleys	Mr. Walker	Episode: "South Side Story"
2001	Resurrection Blvd.	Jesse	Episode: "Sangre de la Mano" & "Con Cuidado"
2002	The District	Judge Thompson	Episode: "Convictions"
2002	Arli$$	Greg Harvey	Episode: "Profiles in Agenting"
2002	The Agency	Joel Whittman	Episode: "C.S. Lie"
2003	Jake 2.0	General Freewald	Episode: "Whiskey - Tango - Foxtrot"
2003–2004	The Bernie Mac Show	Lloyd	Episode: "Meet the Grandparents" & "Make Room for Caddy"
2004	Veronica Mars	Tom Daniels	Episode: "The Girl Next Door"
2005	Monk	Sergeant Parnell	Episode: "Mr. Monk Gets Stuck in Traffic"
2007	Criminal Minds	Captain Wright	Episode: "Legacy"
2008	Desperate Housewives	Frank	Episode: "There's Always a Woman"
2008–2016	Supernatural	Rufus Turner	Guest Cast: season 3 & 5–7 & 11
2009	Cold Case	Ronde Brooks '09	Episode: "Soul"
2012	NTSF:SD:SUV::	Alonzo Bearwalker	Episode: "Wasilla Hills Cop"
2013	Belle's	Judge Crawford	Episode: "One Big Happy Family"
2015	Bones	Pastor Desmond Simmons	Episode: "The Psychic in the Soup"
2015	Chicago P.D.	Bishop	Episode: "Climbing Into Bed" & "You Never Know Who's Who"
2015	iZombie	Barber	Episode: "Max Wager"
2015	The Leftovers	Virgil	Recurring cast: season 2
2015	Minority Report	Bridege Kane	Episode: "Memento Mori" & "Everybody Runs"
2017	Training Day	Cannonball	Episode: "Wages of Sin"
2017	One Mississippi	Frank Hollingsworth	Recurring cast: season 2
2018; 2022	The Chi	Quentin "Q" Dickinson	Recurring cast: season 1 & 5
2019	Project Blue Book	Nate	Episode: "The Lubbock Lights"
2019	True Detective	Junius "Mr. June" Watts	Recurring cast: season 3
2019	Yellowstone	Cowboy	Recurring cast: season 2
2019	Bluff City Law	Connor Markes	Episode: "25 Years to Life"
2019	Black-ish	Phillip	Episode: "Father Christmas"
2019	Ambitions	Stephen Carlisle	Recurring cast
2020	Locke & Key	Joe Ridgeway	Recurring cast: season 1
2020	Stumptown	Lionel Hoffman	Recurring cast
2020–2021	The Family Business	Alexander Cora	Recurring cast: season 2, guest: season 3
2020–2023	All Rise	Tony Carver	Guest: season 1 & 3, recurring cast: season 2
2021	Home Before Dark	Mr. Morton	Episode: "Not Giving Up"
2021–2023	Snowfall	Paul Davis	Recurring cast: seasons 4 & 6
2024–2025	FBI: Most Wanted	Ray Cannon Sr.	Recurring cast
