= 21 Jump Street =

American police procedural television series (1987–1991)

- Genre: Police crime drama
- Created by: Patrick Hasburgh; Stephen J. Cannell
- Starring: Johnny Depp; Holly Robinson; Peter DeLuise; Dustin Nguyen; Richard Grieco; Steven Williams; Michael Bendetti; Michael DeLuise; Sal Jenco; Frederic Forrest
- Theme music composer: Liam Sternberg
- Opening theme: "21 Jump Street Theme" performed by Holly Robinson
- Composers: Peter Bernstein; Jay Gruska
- Country of origin: United States
- Original language: English
- No. of seasons: 5
- No. of episodes: 103 (list of episodes)

Production
- Production locations: Vancouver, British Columbia
- Camera setup: Single-camera
- Running time: 45–48 minutes
- Production companies: Patrick Hasburgh Productions (seasons 1–2); Stephen J. Cannell Productions

Original release
- Network: Fox
- Release: April 12, 1987 – July 16, 1990
- Network: Syndication
- Release: October 13, 1990 – April 27, 1991

Related
- Booker (1989–1990)

21 Jump Street is an American police procedural drama television series created by Patrick Hasburgh and Stephen J. Cannell for the Fox Broadcasting Company. It aired from April 12, 1987, to April 27, 1991, spanning 103 episodes over five seasons; the final season aired in first-run syndication. The series focuses on a squad of youthful-looking undercover police officers investigating crimes in schools, gangs, and other teenage venues. It was originally going to be titled Jump Street Chapel, after the deconsecrated church building in which the unit is headquartered, but was changed at Fox's request so as not to mislead viewers into thinking it was a religious program.

The series was produced by the two creators' production companies; Cannell retains all intellectual property rights of the series. Executive producers included Hasburgh, Cannell, Steve Beers, and Bill Nuss. The show was an early hit for the fledgling Fox network and was created to attract a younger audience. The final season aired in first-run syndication mainly on local Fox affiliates. It was rerun on the FX cable network from 1996 to 1998.

The series provided a spark to Johnny Depp's acting career, gaining him national recognition as a teen idol. Depp found this status irritating, but he continued the series under his contract which paid $45,000 per episode. He was eventually released from his contract after the fourth season.

A spin-off series, Booker, was produced for the character of Dennis Booker (Richard Grieco); it ran for one season, from September 24, 1989, to May 6, 1990. A film adaptation directed by Phil Lord and Christopher Miller was released on March 16, 2012. The film is set the same as the series, with Johnny Depp, Holly Robinson, and Peter DeLuise reprising their characters in cameo appearances. Richard Grieco and Dustin Nguyen also have cameos in the 2014 film sequel 22 Jump Street.

== Premise ==
The series focuses on a group of rookie police officers headquartered at the eponymous address. These young officers all have especially youthful appearances, allowing them to pass for teenagers. Their assignments frequently consist of undercover work in high schools or, less commonly, colleges, where they generally investigate drug trafficking and other criminal activities. The show's plots cover issues such as alcoholism, hate crimes, gang violence, drug abuse, homophobia, AIDS, child abuse, and sexual promiscuity. Similarly, each problem is often solved by the end of the hour-long episode, giving an implicit moral about a particular activity's impact. When the show originally aired, some episodes were followed immediately by public service announcements (PSAs) featuring cast members.

== Episodes ==
Season	Episodes	Originally released		
Season	Episodes	First released	Last released	Network
1	13	April 12, 1987	June 28, 1987	Fox
2	22	September 20, 1987	May 22, 1988	Fox
3	20	November 6, 1988	May 21, 1989	Fox
4	26	September 18, 1989	July 16, 1990	Fox
5	22	October 13, 1990	April 27, 1991	Syndicated

== Cast ==
Name	Portrayed by	Seasons				
Name	Portrayed by	1	2	3	4	5
Officer Thomas "Tom" Hanson, Jr.	Johnny Depp	Main				
Sergeant Judith "Judy" Hoffs	Holly Robinson	Main				
Officer Douglas "Doug" Penhall	Peter DeLuise	Main				Also starring (Note: Episodes 1–10 of season 5)
Sergeant Harry Truman "H.T" Ioki/Vinh Van Tran	Dustin Nguyen	Main				
Captain Richard Jenko	Frederic Forrest	Main (Note: Episodes 1–6 of season 1)				
Captain Adam Fuller	Steven Williams	Main (Note: Episodes 7–13 of season 1)				
Officer Joseph "Joey" Penhall	Michael DeLuise					Main (Note: Episodes 6–17 of season 5)
Officer Anthony "Mac" McCann	Michael Bendetti					Main (Note: Episodes 3–22 of season 5)
Sal "Blowfish" Banducci	Sal Jenco	Recurring				Guest
Detective Dennis Booker	Richard Grieco			Recurring		
Assistant District Attorney (ADA) Jackie Garrett	Yvette Nipar			Recurring		
Officer Dean Garrett	David Barry Gray				Guest	Recurring
Officer Kati Rocky	Alexandra Powers					Recurring

Jeff Yagher was originally cast as Officer Tom Hanson in the pilot. He was replaced after the original pilot episode was filmed, and his scenes were reshot with Johnny Depp. Midway through the first season, Frederic Forrest was replaced by Steven Williams. On the show, Forrest's character Richard Jenko is killed by a drunk driver.

Johnny Depp left the series at the end of the fourth season, but was credited in the first two episodes of the fifth season, despite not having appeared.

David Barry Gray's character was introduced at the end of the fourth season and starred in two episodes of season five with Alexandra Powers. Both episodes were filmed before the fourth season had ended but were not shown until the start of season five. Neither actor was approached in regards to portraying their character in the show's fifth and final season. Michael DeLuise joined the cast in the middle of the fifth season and stayed on until late in the season.

=== Guest stars ===
Some notable guest stars on the series include: Dom DeLuise (Peter's father), Josh Brolin, Mindy Cohn, Bridget Fonda, Bobby Rodriguez, Jada Pinkett, Brad Pitt, Vince Vaughn, Barney Martin, Dann Florek, Blair Underwood, Shannen Doherty, John Waters, Rosie Perez, Kareem Abdul-Jabbar, Mario Van Peebles, Christina Applegate, Pauly Shore, David DeLuise (Peter's brother), Bradley Gregg, Jason Priestley, Christine Elise, Christopher Titus, Kurtwood Smith, Peri Gilpin, Shannon Tweed, Sarah Buxton, David Paymer, Diedrich Bader, Russell Wong, Kelly Hu, Tim Russ, Thomas Haden Church, Sherilyn Fenn, Rob Estes, Ray Walston, R. J. Williams, Robyn Lively, Gloria Reuben, Billy Jayne, Jason Lively, Billy Warlock, Peter Berg, Larenz Tate, Tracy Griffith, and Ed O'Neill.

== Production ==
=== Filming ===
Set in a fictional city and state (Metropolis, Evergreen State) in the United States, the series was primarily filmed in Vancouver, British Columbia. It was one of the first major television series to use Vancouver as a filming location and helped to establish the city as a center for film production.

=== Reception ===
21 Jump Street, along with Married... with Children and The Tracey Ullman Show, debuted in the spring of 1987. All three shows were hits with audiences and helped to establish the then-newly launched Fox network. 21 Jump Street was the first hit series for the Fox network. In August, 21 Jump Street became the first Fox series to win its timeslot against a Big Three network series. In the United Kingdom, it was shown on the similarly nascent, and interrelated, Sky One, which had yet to reach a sizeable audience.

== Broadcast history ==
Season	Timeslot
1986–87	Sunday at 7:00 P.M.-8:00 P.M. on Fox
1987–88	Sunday at 7:00 P.M.-8:00 P.M. on Fox
1988–89	Sunday at 7:00 P.M.-8:00 P.M. on Fox
1989–90	Monday at 8:00 P.M.-9:00 P.M. on Fox
1990–91	off-network syndication

Season 4 was the last season to air on the Fox network. In the commentary provided with the Season 5 DVD set, Peter DeLuise said that Fox had decided to cancel the show after Season 4 because the ratings had fallen below a set limit. Following this season, Johnny Depp and Dustin Nguyen left the show. The departure of their characters was never fully explained in the narrative of the TV series, but in the movie it is explained that Officer Hanson was transferred to the DEA and was later joined by Officer Penhall. The Booker spin-off crossover episode, "Wheels and Deals – Part One," is included with 21 Jump Street's syndication package, and is also included on the Season 4 DVD set.

Officer Dean Garrett (David Barry Gray) makes his first appearance in "Everyday is Christmas." As it became more difficult for the original Jump Street cast to pass as high-school students, younger actors were brought in, intended to be "youthful" replacements in order to allow the show to maintain its original premise of young-looking cops posing as high-school students.

== Home media ==
Anchor Bay Entertainment released all five seasons of 21 Jump Street on DVD in Region 1 between 2004 and 2006.

On October 14, 2009, it was announced that Mill Creek Entertainment had acquired the rights to several Stephen J. Cannell series, including 21 Jump Street, and subsequently re-released the first four seasons. In addition, Mill Creek also released 21 Jump Street: The Complete Series, an 18-disc collection featuring all 103 episodes of the series on DVD on July 27, 2010.

On July 29, 2022, Visual Entertainment released 21 Jump Street: The Complete Series on DVD in Region 1.

In Region 2, Anchor Bay Entertainment released all 5 seasons on DVD in the UK. They also released a complete series set on March 5, 2012.

In Region 4, Madman Entertainment released all five seasons on DVD in Australia. They also released a complete series collection on May 1, 2013.

In Region 2, Pidax Film released a complete series set box set on September 18, 2020, in Germany with all original music intact. German and English audio tracks.

DVD name	Ep #	Release dates		
DVD name	Ep #	Region 1	Region 2	Region 4
The Complete First Season	13	October 26, 2004; January 19, 2010 (re-release)	January 31, 2005	September 7, 2006
The Complete Second Season	22	March 8, 2005; May 18, 2010 (re-release)	June 20, 2005	September 7, 2006
The Complete Third Season	20	September 6, 2005; July 27, 2010 (re-release)	January 23, 2006	September 7, 2006
The Complete Fourth Season	26	November 1, 2005; January 18, 2011 (re-release)	April 10, 2006	September 7, 2006
The Complete Fifth Season	22	March 21, 2006	September 18, 2006	June 7, 2007
The Complete Series	103	July 27, 2010; July 29, 2022 (re-release)	March 5, 2012 & September 18, 2020	May 1, 2013

== Film adaptation ==
On March 16, 2012, a feature film based on the television series from Sony Pictures and Metro Goldwyn Mayer was released starring Jonah Hill and Channing Tatum (who are also executive producers) and directed by Phil Lord and Chris Miller with the screenplay written by Michael Bacall from a story by both Hill and Bacall. Johnny Depp, Peter DeLuise, and Holly Robinson briefly reprise their roles as Tom Hanson, Doug Penhall, and Judy Hoffs.

Described in concept by Hill as an "R-rated, insane, Bad Boys-meets-John Hughes-type movie," the film departs from the dramatic style of the series and instead features a comedic tone. The film and series are also set in the same continuity. A sequel titled 22 Jump Street was released in 2014.
