= Cannell =

Cannell is a chiefly Manx surname which is derived from the Gaelic/Celtic McConnell or O'Connell. Cannell is one of the earliest recorded surnames on the Isle of Man. An Ogham Stone from the 5th century A.D found at Ballaqueeny on the Isle of Man reads that this is the stone of "Bivadonis Maqi Mucoi Cunava(li)" Cunava or Cunavali being the tribal name predating Cannell (Connell, O'Connell, McConnell etc.) In English translates as "Bivadonis Son of the tribe Cunava". The Cunavali originated around County Louth in Ireland. They are considered "Cruithne" or Irish Picts, the race existing before Celtic immigration.

== Spelling variations ==
Spelling variations of this family name include: Canell, Cannell, Conal, Conall, Conel, Connal, Connall, Connel, Connell, Connill, Connul, Connull, O'Conell, O'Connall, O'Connell

== People ==
- Brenda Cannell, Manx politician
- Dorothy Cannell, English novelist
- Geoff Cannell, Manx politician
- Kathleen Eaton Cannell, American correspondent
- Paul Cannell, English footballer
- Skipwith Cannell, American poet
- Stephen J. Cannell, American writer, TV producer, actor
