= Booker (TV series) =

American TV crime drama series

- Genre: Police procedural; Crime drama
- Created by: Eric Blackeney; Stephen J. Cannell
- Starring: Richard Grieco; Carmen Argenziano; Marcia Strassman
- Opening theme: "Hot in the City (Exterminator Mix)" performed by Billy Idol
- Ending theme: "Hot in the City (Exterminator Mix)" performed by Billy Idol
- Composer: Mike Post
- Country of origin: United States
- Original language: English
- No. of seasons: 1
- No. of episodes: 22

Production
- Executive producer: Bill Nuss
- Producers: Carleton Eastlake; Brooke Kennedy; Jo Swerling, Jr.
- Production location: Vancouver
- Running time: 45–48 minutes
- Production company: Stephen J. Cannell Productions

Original release
- Network: Fox
- Release: September 24, 1989 – May 6, 1990

Related
- 21 Jump Street

Booker is an American crime drama series starring Richard Grieco that aired on Fox from September 24, 1989, to May 6, 1990. The series is a spin-off of 21 Jump Street and the second installment of the Jump Street franchise. The character of Dennis Booker was originally a recurring character on the police drama during its third season.

== Synopsis ==
Dennis Booker, who once worked for a large metropolitan police department, is now hired by the US office of a large Japanese company to investigate some suspicious insurance claims. Booker is portrayed as despising authority, and he is often openly disdainful of the orders he receives. He also occasionally undertakes non-work-related tasks in order to help friends and family. Katie Rich left the show in the middle of its run, and Lori Petty was added to the cast.

Fox scheduled Booker as its Sunday night leadoff program, airing in the 7/6 pm slot that was vacated by its parent series, 21 Jump Street; the latter moved to Monday nights. Booker was not the hit that its predecessor had been, with Fox eventually moving the show to 10:00 pm (during the period when the network was programming past that hour on Sundays) and later cancelling it following the season.

== Cast ==
=== Main ===
- Richard Grieco as Dennis Booker
- Carmen Argenziano as Chick Sterling
- Marcia Strassman as Alicia Rudd
- Katie Rich as Elaine Grazzo (episodes 1–16)
- Lori Petty as Suzanne Dunne (episodes 15–22)

=== Notable guest stars ===
- Peter DeLuise as Officer Doug Penhall (from 21 Jump Street)
- Holly Robinson Peete as Officer Judy Hoffs (from 21 Jump Street)
- Steven Williams as Captain Adam Fuller (from 21 Jump Street)
- Thomas Haden Church as Michael
- Ben Vereen as Ben
- Mariska Hargitay as Michelle
- Don S. Davis in various roles
- Maura Tierney as Donna Cofax
- Marcia Cross
- Don Cheadle as Frenchie Sayles (episode 2)
- Vanity
- Gedde Watanabe
- Tawny Kitaen
- James Hong
- Heavy D
- Jay O. Sanders as Gordon Rudd

== Episodes ==
No.	Title	Directed by	Written by	Original release date	Prod. code
1	"Booker"	David Jackson	Stephen J. Cannell	September 24, 1989	31101
Dennis Booker helps Elaine clear a man she thinks was wrongly convicted when she served jury duty.
2	"The Pump"	Mark Sobel	Story by : Nicholas J. Corea; Teleplay by : Stephen J. Cannell & Nicholas J. Corea	October 1, 1989	31102
Booker is targeted by a gang seeking revenge for the death of a member who shot Judy (Holly Robinson guest-starring from 21 Jump Street).
3	"Raising Arrizola"	Rob Bowman	Gordon Dawson	October 8, 1989	31106
Booker has a busy day getting involved with a Teshima executive, avoiding a supposedly reformed ex-con and trying to keep a homeless kid on the right path.
4	"High Rise"	Jorge Montesi	Carleton Eastlake	October 22, 1989	31109
In an homage to Die Hard, Booker takes action when gunmen take the execs of Teshima hostage.
5	"All You Gotta Do Is Do It"	Reynaldo Villalobos	Stephen J. Cannell	October 29, 1989	31105
Alicia asks Booker to find her gambler ex-husband when he takes off with their daughter.
6	"Bête Noir"	James Whitmore Jr.	Charles Grant Craig	November 5, 1989	31110
Booker concocts a plan to catch a woman he suspects murdered her two husbands for insurance money.
7	"Flat Out"	Jefferson Kibbee	Carleton Eastlake	November 12, 1989	31111
Booker races to find a young woman who skipped bail before mobsters kill her.
8	"Wheels and Deals – Part 1"	Mark Sobel	Charles Grant Craig & Thania St. John	November 26, 1989	31113
Booker plots the downfall of his nemesis Raymond Crane. This episode concludes on 21 Jump Street.
9	"Someone Stole Lucille"	Kim Manners	Bill Nuss	December 10, 1989	31112
Booker and a young Teshima executive from Japan are sent to find B.B. King's stolen guitar.
10	"Cementhead"	Jorge Montesi	Glen Morgan & James Wong	December 17, 1989	31114
Booker deals with his childhood idol, a hockey player seeking to make a comeback on a team owned by Teshima.
11	"The Red Dot"	Mario Azzopardi	Story by : Carleton Eastlake; Teleplay by : Bill Nuss & Charles Grant Craig	January 14, 1990	31118
A woman hires Booker to find her missing boyfriend, who's also the target of a hit man.
12	"Who Framed Roger Thorton?"	Jefferson Kibbee	Story by : Thania St. John; Teleplay by : Charles Grant Craig	January 21, 1990	31115
Booker investigates the murder of a fashion designer and encounters an old acquaintance.
13	"Hacker"	Bryan Spicer	Story by : Carleton Eastlake; Teleplay by : Carleton Eastlake & Charles Grant Craig	February 4, 1990	31119
Booker is pursued by the FBI as soon as he cracks a computer hacker's code.
14	"The Life and Death of Chick Sterling"	Kim Manners	Bill Nuss & Thania St. John	February 11, 1990	31122
Chick and an old army buddy are targeted for assassination because of a past incident.
15	"Black Diamond Run"	Peter D. Marshall	Seth Pearlman	February 18, 1990	31120
A cat burglar is stealing from guests at a ski resort who are insured by Teshima.
16	"Love Life"	Jefferson Kibbee	Story by : Gary Rosen & Jacqueline Zambrano; Teleplay by : Jacqueline Zambrano	February 25, 1990	31121
Booker sets out to prove that a prostitute was framed for stabbing a Teshima executive.
17	"Reunion"	Jan Eliasberg	Carleton Eastlake & Thania St. John	March 25, 1990	31124
Booker attends his high school reunion where an old girlfriend asks him to find her missing fiancé, who happens to be the guy she left Booker for.
18	"Wedding Bell Blues"	Jefferson Kibbee	Charles Grant Craig & Bill Nuss & Thania St. John	April 1, 1990	31125
An old high school friend of Booker's is engaged to two women, both of whom have vengeful relatives.
19	"Molly and Eddie"	David Nutter	Charles Grant Craig & Bill Nuss & Thania St. John	April 8, 1990	31123
Booker takes care of a 6-year-old girl while he searches for her father, a repo man who may have gotten involved in a stolen car ring.
20	"Crazy"	Bill Corcoran	Chad Hayes & Carey W. Hayes	April 15, 1990	31127
A crazy killer escapes custody and leads Booker on a journey through his troubled psyche.
21	"Mobile Home"	Christopher T. Welch	Story by : David Kemper; Teleplay by : Charles Grant Craig & Bill Nuss & Thania St. John	April 29, 1990	31128
Booker helps a friend search for his first home, which has been stolen by three siblings hunting for treasure.
22	"Father's Day"	Jan Eliasberg	Jan Eliasberg	May 6, 1990	31129
Booker's father asks for his help when he must testify against the mob.

== Home media ==
On September 17, 2008, Beyond Home Entertainment released Booker- The Complete Series on DVD in Australia (Region 4). The episode titled "Deals and Wheels pt.1" has been removed as it is part of a crossover with 21 Jump Street. Both episodes are included on the 4th season release of 21 Jump Street. The original Billy Idol "Hot in the City" main theme song is intact on the episodes. The episode "Someone Stole Lucille" is included in this set as well.

On August 25, 2009, Mill Creek Entertainment released Booker- Collector's Edition on DVD in Region 1. Music rights have kept the episode "Someone Stole Lucille" from appearing on the set, thus the reason why the title of the release was changed from 'complete series'. The theme song was also changed to a generic action piece (entitled "Hot Summer Night") as the rights to "Hot in the City" could not be negotiated.

DVD name	Ep #	Region 1	Region 4
Booker: Collector's Edition	22	August 25, 2009	September 17, 2008
