= Michael Bacall =

American screenwriter and actor

- Born: Michael Stephen Bucellato
- Occupations: Actor, screenwriter
- Years active: 1985–present

Michael Bacall (born Michael Stephen Bucellato; April 19, 1973) is an American screenwriter and actor, known for having co-written the films Scott Pilgrim vs. the World (2010), Project X (2012), 21 Jump Street (2012), and its sequel 22 Jump Street (2014).

== Career ==
Bacall co-wrote and co-starred in Manic. As of 2007, Bacall has sold a number of scripts to major studios, including Psycho Funky Chimp and In Search of Captain Zero.

In June 2007, New Line announced that Bacall would be writing a feature adaptation of the documentary The King of Kong. He co-wrote the adaptation of the Canadian graphic novel series Scott Pilgrim, Scott Pilgrim vs. the World, with its director, Edgar Wright.

== Filmography ==
=== Acting ===
- 1985: Highway to Heaven as Jimmy Patterson
- 1989: Columbo: "Columbo Goes to the Guillotine" as Tommy
- 1989: Wait Until Spring, Bandini as Arturo Bandini
- 1991: Shout as Big Boy
- 1993: Irresistible force as Jesse Delvechio
- 1993: Free Willy as Perry
- 1993: This Boy's Life as Terry Taylor
- 1993: The Nanny as Tommy
- 1997: Buffy the Vampire Slayer: "Some Assembly Required" as Eric Gittleson
- 2000: Urban Legends: Final Cut as Dirk Reynolds
- 2001: Manic as Chad
- 2002: Pumpkin as Casey Whitner
- 2002: Speakeasy as Gene
- 2004: Undertow as Jacob
- 2007: Grindhouse – Death Proof as Omar
- 2009: Inglourious Basterds as Pfc. Michael Zimmerman
- 2012: Django Unchained as Smitty Bacall (uncredited)
- 2013: The End of Love as himself
- 2013: Gangster Squad as Comanche
- 2018: Spivak as Wally Spivak

=== Screenwriting ===
- 2001: Manic
- 2003: Bookies
- 2010: Scott Pilgrim vs. the World
- 2012: Project X
- 2012: 21 Jump Street
- 2014: 22 Jump Street
- 2025: The Running Man
- TBA: Weird Science
