= John Truby =

American screenwriter, director and teacher

- Occupations: screenwriter, film director, author and screenwriting lecturer
- Notable work: Anatomy of Story: 22 Steps to Becoming a Master Storyteller
- Website: truby.com

John Truby (born 1952) is an American screenwriter, director, screenwriting teacher and author. He has served as a consultant on over 1,000 film scripts over the past three decades, and is also known for the screenwriting software program Blockbuster (originally "Storyline Pro"). He is the author of Anatomy of Story: 22 Steps to Becoming a Master Storyteller, a book about screenwriting skills.

== Screenwriting career ==
In the 1980s, Truby received his first credits, writing three episodes of 21 Jump Street, as well as serving as a story editor. He later received a co-writer credit on the 2011 Disneynature documentary film African Cats. A portion of the proceeds for the film were donated to the African Wildlife Foundation and their effort to preserve Kenya's Amboseli Wildlife Corridor.

== Teaching ==
Unlike many authors and teachers on the subject, Truby is critical of Syd Field's three-act "Paradigm", viewing it as a mechanical means of storytelling, and argues that most teachers of screenwriting emphasize inner transformation of characters but not the moral effect their actions have on others. Instead, Truby crafted his own 22-step outline, which formed the basis of Truby's first book, The Anatomy of Story: 22 Steps to Becoming a Master Storyteller published in October, 2007 by Faber and Faber.

Truby has since spun off his techniques into worldwide Masterclasses.

== Works ==
- The Anatomy of Story: 22 Steps to Becoming a Master Storyteller, Faber and Faber, 2007
- The Anatomy of Genres: How Story Forms Explain the Way the World Works, Picador, 2022
