= Sal Jenco =

American film and television actor

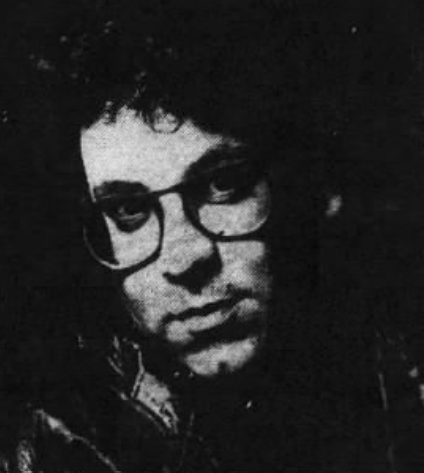
- Jenco in 1988
- Born: Newark, New Jersey, U.S.
- Occupation: Actor
- Years active: 1987–1998

Sal Jenco is an American film and television actor. He is best known for playing maintenance engineer Blowfish in the American police procedural television series 21 Jump Street.

Jenco appeared in television programs including Beauty and the Beast and The Wonder Years, and also in films such as Trouble Bound (as Danny), Arizona Dream, Tall Tale and Donnie Brasco. During his screen career, in 1993, he and actor Johnny Depp co-owned and managed The Viper Room, a nightclub in West Hollywood, California.

Jenco retired from acting in 1998, last appearing in the film Living Out Loud.
