= Patrick Hasburgh =

American television producer and writer

- Occupation(s): Director, producer and writer
- Years active: 1982–2004
- Spouse: Cheri Hasburgh

Patrick Hasburgh is an American television producer and writer.

He is best known for his work on the television series Hardcastle and McCormick and 21 Jump Street, two series he co-created with Stephen J. Cannell. His other television credits include The Greatest American Hero, The A-Team, SeaQuest 2032 and L.A. Firefighters.

Between the late 1980s and the early 1990s, he had his own film and television production company, Patrick Hasburgh Productions, who developed pilots for Fox Broadcasting Company, the American Broadcasting Company, and Walt Disney Television.

In 1993, he wrote and directed the feature film Aspen Extreme.

In 2004, Thomas Dunne Books published his first novel (mystery), Aspen Pulp.

In 2018, HarperCollins published Patrick Hasburgh's second novel, PIRATA (ISBN 978-0062742773).
