= The A-Team season 1 =

Season of television series

The A-Team
- Season 1
- Original season 1 DVD cover
- No. of episodes: 14

Release
- Original network: NBC
- Original release: January 23 – May 10, 1983

Season chronology
- Next → Season 2

The first season of the action-adventure television series The A-Team premiered in the United States on NBC on January 23, 1983, and concluded on May 10, 1983, consisting of 14 episodes.

== Cast ==
- George Peppard as Lieutenant Colonel/Colonel John "Hannibal" Smith
- Tim Dunigan as First Lieutenant Templeton Arthur "Faceman" Peck (feature-length pilot only)
- Dirk Benedict as First Lieutenant Templeton Arthur "Faceman" Peck (other 12 episodes)
- Melinda Culea as Journalist/Reporter Amy Amanda "Triple A" Allen
- Dwight Schultz as Captain H. M. Murdock
- Mr. T as Sergeant First Class Bosco Albert "B. A." (Bad Attitude) Baracus

== Episodes ==
| No. overall | No. in season | Title | Directed by | Written by | Original release date |
|---|---|---|---|---|---|
| 1 | 1 | "Mexican Slayride" | Rod Holcomb | Frank Lupo & Stephen J. Cannell | January 23, 1983 |
| 2 | 2 | "Mexican Slayride" | Rod Holcomb | Frank Lupo & Stephen J. Cannell | January 23, 1983 |
Newspaper reporter Amy Allen sets out to prove that The A-Team – an elite US Special Forces commando unit from the Vietnam War convicted of a crime they did not commit – really exists and are working on the side of the law as mercenaries. After passing several tests she ends up hiring them to rescue one of her fellow reporters, Al Massey, who has been kidnapped by Mexican bandits led by Malavida Valdez. The A-Team — Colonel John "Hannibal" Smith, Lieutenant Templeton "The Faceman" Peck ("Face"), and Sergeant Bosco Albert "B.A." Baracus — travel to Mexico by plane, piloted by their fearless but clinically insane pilot, Captain H.M. "Howling Mad" Murdock. After fighting off the bandits with equipment the Team have scammed and scavenged, they are soon captured by a band of guerrilla soldiers whose leader, Colonel Flores, is working with Valdez. In the final battle they are assisted by the villagers and with their help, the A-Team is able to overthrow both the bandits and guerrillas, save the reporter and make their way home. Once home, Amy Allen blackmails her way onto the team.: Note: Originally shown as a feature-length pilot TV movie, which was later cut into two separate episodes for syndication.
| 3 | 3 | "Children of Jamestown" | Christian I. Nyby II | Stephen J. Cannell | January 30, 1983 |
The A-Team is hired to rescue a wealthy man's daughter from a religious cult, led by the insane Reverend James. The rescue is successful, but the team is caught by the cult. Murdock has to return to rescue the rest of the team. After escaping, the A-Team hide out at a nearby farm. The military police come to arrest the A-Team and instead arrest the religious cult. Humorously, the only reason Hannibal seems to have for wanting to get back at Reverend James was because he stole his boots (which Hannibal recovers in the final scene of the episode). Special Guest Star: John Saxon as Rev. Martin James
| 4 | 4 | "Pros and Cons" | Ron Satlof | Stephen J. Cannell | February 8, 1983 |
B.A.'s friend Jase is sent to a prison, where he must fight in death matches for the amusement of the warden and several high-profile gamblers. Jase is able to escape but is captured again in front of B.A., who enlists the other members of the A-Team to help out his friend. In the end, they use the camera for the fights to get the warden and everyone else involved on film; the warden is fired and Jase is revealed to have already served his time, since the warden trumped up fake crimes to keep him around. At the beginning and end of the episode, Hannibal (disguised as his own agent) is trying to get another job for himself; when the news about the A-Team's efforts hit the TVs, he humorously almost reveals he was involved.: Guest stars: Clifton James as Warden Beale; William Smith as Jase Tataro; Red West as Lt. Red Trask; Ken Norton as Jackhammer Jackson; Special Guest Star: Meeno Peluce as Joey Tataro
| 5 | 5 | "A Small and Deadly War" | Ron Satlof | Frank Lupo | February 15, 1983 |
Police Inspector Ed Maloney seeks the A-Team's help in bringing down a renegade LAPD SWAT team that has been committing crimes for money. As pointed out by B.A., "It's like the A-Team is going up against themselves"; they bug the SWAT team's uniforms to collect intel, saving a target and aggravating their leader. In the end, the A-Team succeeds in the capture of three members of the SWAT team, while convincing another to snitch on them. Meeting up with Maloney, the A-Team returns the pay he had given them, with their expenses deducted.: Guest stars: Jack Ging as Capt. Robert Stark; Dean Stockwell as Officer Collins; Norman Alden as Inspector Edward Maloney; Al White as Steve Meadows; Fil Formiloca as Donny Shaeffer; Carol Baxter as Nurse; Ismael Carlo as Delgado; Lew Palter as Desk Sergeant; Connie Downing as Bonnie Webb; Dave Morick as Mickey; Rhonda Shear as Waitress
| 6 | 6 | "Black Day at Bad Rock" | Christian I. Nyby II | Patrick Hasburgh | February 22, 1983 |
B.A. Baracus has - under unknown circumstances - received a .50 calibre gunshot wound in the leg, forcing Hannibal and Face to take him to a small-town doctor for help. Due to B.A.'s appearance and rudeness, the doctor assumes that he is a part of a group of bikers that has threatened to return to Bad Rock for their captured leader; she calls the sheriff, who arrests Hannibal and Face. In the meantime, Amy is forced to bring Murdock to Bad Rock to give B.A. blood. Hannibal and Face's prints are taken, alerting Lynch to their location; however, they manage to escape and imprison the sheriff. They convince the doctor to give B.A. a blood transfusion, which has a small effect on his personality. Not wanting to feel responsible for leaving Bad Rock defenseless, the A-Team allies with the sheriff to set up traps to defeat the bikers. The A-Team takes off right as Lynch arrives in pursuit.: Guest Stars: Sid Haig as Sonny Jenco; Tricia O'Neil as Dr. Maggie Sullivan; Ed Lauter as Sheriff Hank Thompson; John Dennis Johnston as Barbarian biker; Ted Gehring as Deputy Jack Harmson
| 7 | 7 | "The Rabbit Who Ate Las Vegas" | Bruce Kessler | Frank Lupo | March 1, 1983 |
The A-Team are called to Las Vegas by two college girls to search for their missing professor Bruce Warfel who developed the perfect gambling system. The team rescue him from Gianni Christian, a high-ranking mobster, whose thugs couldn't understand the professor's explanations as to how his method works (though Murdock understands easily). However, their "ride into the sunset" moment is cut short when Gianni is thrown to his death and the team becomes the prime suspects because of their scam/rescue. With a bounty out and Hannibal's face captured on camera, the A-Team quickly figure out that Gianni's #2 guy killed him; they arrange for his arrest while escaping before Lynch arrives.: Guest stars: Richard Romanus as Jackie Martell; Terence McGovern as Prof. Bruce Warfel; Luke Andreas as Jilly; Kitty Mofatt as Darlene; Floyd Levine as Carmine; Charles Cioffi as Gianni Christian; Michelle Avonne as Sue Beth; Richard Reicheg as Mr. DeSapio; Tracy Scoggins as Elly Payne; Christopher Thomas as Hotel Desk Clerk; Michael Laurence as Newscaster; Alma Beltran as Maid; James Dybas as Doorman; Timothy Prager as Florist Messenger
| 8 | 8 | "The Out-of-Towners" | Chuck Bowman | Frank Lupo | March 15, 1983 |
The A-Team is called to New York City by a community of small business owners, who are being abused by a wealthy businessman that's forcing them into a protection racket. The team forgoes payment out of concern for the businesses, deciding to force the brute into paying back all the money he's taken. Hannibal has trash dumped at the club the thugs reside at, calling them in for a final reckoning. At the same time, Face has to trap a rude, ignorant rider in his taxi cab before the fight; humorously, Face told him numerous times that he was off duty to get rid of him.: Guest stars: Yaphet Kotto as East-Side Charlie; Jack Kruschen as Bernie Shatzman; Robert Tessier as Scully; Priscilla Pointer as Tracy Richter's Mother; Albert Popwell as Digger; J. Jay Saunders as Grocery Store Owner; William Jacoby as Nicky; Wendy Hoffman as Tracy Richter; Martin Garner as Mr. Laskey; Peter Iacangelo as Angry Cab Customer; Joni Demarest as Rita - Eastside Charlie's Girlfriend; Howard Vann as Airport Guard
| 9 | 9 | "Holiday in the Hills" | Arnold Laven | Babs Greyhosky | March 22, 1983 |
The A-Team is coming back to the USA after a job in Guatemala in a Beechcraft C18S airplane "borrowed" and piloted by Murdock (with B.A. conveniently sedated) when after an engine failure they are forced to an emergency landing in the backwoods of South Carolina. There, they come across a group of men trying to burn another man at the stake. Saving the man, they must then defend their position by the plane and hope to make their way home. *Guest stars: Bill McKinney as Clint; Mickey Jones as Redneck; Edward Winter as Mitchell Barnes
| 10 | 10 | "West Coast Turnaround" | Guy Magar | Story by : Babs Greyhosky; Teleplay by : Stephen J. Cannell and Patrick Hasburgh | April 5, 1983 |
The A-Team are called in to protect a small-time farmer in delivering his produce to the market. Blocking them is the land-hungry Chuck Easterman, who has control of most of the town. They have to fight the clock as the produce slowly starts to rot. In the ensuing battle, Amy loses her brand new car; Face is forced to give up a large percentage of the A-Team's share in the sell of the watermelons to cover it. Special Guest Star: Stuart Whitman as Chuck Easterman.
| 11 | 11 | "One More Time" | Arnold Laven | Story by : Babs Greyhosky; Teleplay by : Frank Lupo and Patrick Hasburgh | April 12, 1983 |
The Military Police finally capture the A-Team but Lynch doesn't get much of a chance to gloat about it when a high ranking State Department official steps in and coerces the Team into a covert operation to rescue the team's former commanding officer, General Ludlum, who, along with his daughter, has been captured by a power hungry dictator in Borneo. B.A is especially reluctant to go, as the officer court-martialed him in Vietnam, for which B.A broke his nose. Unfortunately, the team is given incorrect information about the enemy compound and are captured; they are believed to be legitimate American agents, no matter how many times Hannibal tries to correct them.: Guest stars: Edward Grover as Major Briggs; Alan Fudge as Mr. Perry; Nico Mindaros as Rashaad; Warren J. Kemmerling as General Ludlam; Amy Steel as Kathy Ludlam; Danny Wells as Film Director; Barbra Horan as Rhonda; Dean Santoro as Aide; William Lucking as Col. Lynch; Dennis Haysbert as Psych Staff Ward; Casey King as Assistant Director; Patrick Cameron as Guard; Rick Fitts as Burrows; Robb Madrid as Sergeant at Arms; Judd Omen as Guerrilla
| 12 | 12 | "Till Death Do Us Part" | Guy Magar | Babs Greyhosky | April 19, 1983 |
The A-Team must rescue a reluctant bride from the hands of her would-be husband, a sociopath murderer and former business partner of her late father. With the team's arrival on the late side, Face becomes the target for Hannibal's newest plan: to wed the bride. The plan succeeds, and the A-Team retrieve a tape from a recording left by the bride's father that recorded the murder. In an ironic twist, the team escapes via helicopter, but only B.A. comes out a crash-landing unscathed due to being unconscious and therefore not tense during the landing.: Guest Stars: John Ericson as Calvin Cutter; Noble Willingham as Pete Stockton
| 13 | 13 | "The Beast from the Belly of a Boeing" | Ron Satlof | Patrick Hasburgh | May 3, 1983 |
The A-Team are called in to rescue a hijacked Boeing 747. In doing so, B.A. must overcome his fear of flying in order to rescue Hannibal and Face (in disguise), who willingly give themselves up to the hijackers in exchange for the hostages. When Murdock is blinded after a gun goes off close to his face by one of the hijackers, Hannibal must fly a plane for the first time.: Note: When discussing how to land the plane, Murdock mentions the plot to Terror in the Sky, a 1971 TV-Movie remake of Zero Hour!. Near the end of the episode, the plane is seen crashing through a lobby-window at the airport, this scene was the same footage made for the film Airplane!, a 1980 comedy-remake of Zero Hour!.; Guest star: Andrew J. Robinson as Jackson (leader of the hijackers)
| 14 | 14 | "A Nice Place to Visit" | Bernard McEveety | Frank Lupo | May 10, 1983 |
The A-Team find themselves in a small town, paying respects to a fallen comrade from the Vietnam War. While there, they discover that the four Watkins brothers rule the town with intimidation, even so much as to warn the townspeople to stay away from the funeral. The A-Team then seek to avenge his murder and bring his killers to justice. Special Guest Stars: Don Stroud as Deke Watkins: Joanna Kerns as Trish Brenner; Burton Gilliam as Sheriff Jeff Lewis; Ted Markland as Logan Watkins; M. C. Gainey as C.W. Watkins
