= The A-Team (comics) =

Comics adapted from TV series and movies

- The A-Team vol. 1, #1 (Mar. 1984). Cover art by Marie Severin.

Group publication information
- Publisher: Marvel Comics; IDW Publishing
- First appearance: The A-Team (vol. 1) #1 (March 1984)
- Created by: Frank Lupo; Stephen J. Cannell

In-story information
- Type of organization: Team
- Leader(s): Col. John "Hannibal" Smith
- Agent(s): Lt. Templeton "Faceman" Peck; Capt. H.M. "Howling Mad" Murdock; Bosco "B.A." Baracus; Amy "Triple A" Allen

The A-Team (comics)

Series publication information
- Format: Miniseries

Creative team
- Writer(s): Marvel Comics: Marie Severin, Jim Salicrup, Alan Kupperberg; War Stories: Chuck Dixon, Erik Burnham; Shotgun Wedding: Joe Carnahan, Tom Waltz
- Artist(s): Marvel Comics: Marie Severin, Jim Mooney, Joe Giella, Alan Kupperberg; War Stories: Various, including Hugo Petrus, Casey Maloney; Shotgun Wedding: Stephen Mooney
- Creator(s): Frank Lupo; Stephen J. Cannell

The A-Team TV series and film have been adapted into several comics.

== Marvel Comics ==
In 1984, Marvel Comics released an A-Team title, which ran for 3 issues. The three issues were published within the same month so that they could be bundled together and sold in chain stores. Jim Salicrup, who edited all three issues and wrote two of them, said that due to the tight deadline and the unavailability of A-Team episodes on home media, he watched a single episode of the series on TV and delivered both his plots to production studio Universal for their approval the next day. The Marvel Comics series was sold individually and released in "packs": one pack contained the first 2 issues, the other all 3 issues. Each pack was in a sealed transparent bag featuring Marvel's logo and a picture of Spider-Man. Marvel released the series in a trade paperback called The A-Team Storybook. (ISBN 0517553856).

The Marvel US comics were also reprinted by Marvel UK in a variety of formats, including hardback annual book and The A-Team Summer Special 1985 and The A-Team Summer Special #2 (1986). The final Marvel UK hardback A-Team annual was released in 1991, several years after the cancellation of The A-Team TV series, showing its continued popularity in the UK despite this.

== IDW Publishing ==
=== The A-Team: War Stories ===
In 2010, a miniseries titled The A-Team: War Stories was released to promote the film. The miniseries consisted of four one-shot comics based on each team member before they joined the A-Team. Although Chuck Dixon and Erik Burnham are credited as co-writers for each installment, Dixon stated that they split the work, with Dixon writing the installments for John "Hannibal" Smith and Templeton Peck, and Burnham writing the installments for B. A. Baracus and Howling Mad Murdock. The series contains art from Hugo Petrus and Casey Maloney, among others.

Although the story has been updated to the Gulf War like in the film adaption, and the characters take the appearance of the film's cast, Dixon stated that the miniseries is based on the original TV series.

War Stories: Hannibal

- War Stories: Hannibal was primarily written by Dixon. Hannibal, deep into trouble extracting a chemical weapon engineer from Saddam Hussein's army with a poor disguise and only a glimmer of a plan, must think (and shoot) his way out of it. Dixon stated, "He takes some crazy risks in inserting himself into Iraq early in January [19]91 to kidnap a scientist who's aiding Saddam. Everything goes wrong, and Hannibal has to keep changing his plans on the fly."
- War Stories: Face was released in April 2010, primarily written by Dixon. Face "races to locate an expensive motorcycle in the middle of a warzone." Dixon stated, "In the Face story, we have Templeton Peck making one deal too many in his capacity as a scrounger. His error compounds himself through a series of disasters until he finds himself on the infamous Highway of Death, saving the life of a beautiful woman he just happened to run across. Classic A-Team stuff." Face was illustrated by Alberto Muriel and colored by Gerry Kissell.
- War Stories: B.A. was released in March 2010, primarily written by Burnham. "B.A.'s story, quite naturally, deals quite a bit with his...aversion to flying." It features B.A. "driving, smashing and otherwise bulldozing his way through a dilemma that ultimately leads to his dishonorable discharge."
- War Stories: Murdock was released in April 2010, primarily written by Burnham. "Murdock's story is a tale told by him through his own skewed perspective on reality."

"Both [B.A.'s and Murdock's installments] are very funny, with Murdock's story being packed with laugh-out-loud lines. Erik killed on both of them."

=== The A-Team: Shotgun Wedding ===
Shotgun Wedding is another miniseries that brings the whole team together. It was written by the film's director Joe Carnahan and Tom Waltz, and illustrated by Stephen Mooney.

Taking place after the events of The A-Team, after their escape, Shotgun Wedding unfolds on a cruise ship. The A-Team is tasked with protecting the daughter of Hannibal's old comrade, after her life is threatened and her upcoming wedding is endangered. Posing as members of the ship's crew and the wedding team, Hannibal becomes the priest, Murdock the chef, B.A. the chauffeur and bodyguard, and Face becomes the couple's wedding planner. There are complications as Murdock's culinary abilities are questionable and Face is already all-too familiar with the bride.

== Other adaptions ==
An A-Team comic adaptation appeared in Look-In throughout the 1980s. An A-Team strip also ran in TV Comic sold in UK. The length of its run is unknown.
