= Marla Heasley =

American actress (born 1959)

- Born: September 4, 1959 (age 66)
- Occupation: Actress
- Years active: 1979–1993

Marla Heasley (born September 4, 1959) is an American film and television actress best known for her role as Tawnia Baker in the 1980s hit TV series: The A-Team.

== The A-Team ==
Heasley was cast for the role of Tawnia Baker; a newspaper reporter working with the team. Introduced in season 2 episode 15 "The Battle of Bel-Air", the character was brought in as a replacement for Melinda Culea (Amy Allen), who was abruptly dropped from the series after insisting on being given more to do.

In order to be written out of the series the character was married off in the season 3 two-part episode 2/3 "The Bend in the River". The name of Heasley's character was stipulated by series creator: Stephen J. Cannell where he combined his daughter's first name (Tawnia) with his mother's maiden name (Baker). Some time prior to being cast as Tawnia Baker, Heasley made a guest appearance as a bikini clad co-ed called Cherise in a short-term relationship with Templeton "Faceman" Peck in season 2 episode 4 "Bad Time On The Border".

== Other roles ==
Prior to The A-Team, Heasley appeared in the very first four episodes of Star Search in the Spokesmodel category. Heasley has made guest appearances on many other TV shows such as, T. J. Hooker, The Love Boat, Riptide, Mike Hammer, The Highwayman, and many more. She played an unnamed Air Force Lieutenant in the Galactica 1980 episode "Spaceball".

Heasley's feature film roles were The Marrying Man in 1991, Born to Race in 1987 and Amore! in 1993.
