= Mexican Slayride =

- The A-Team episodes
- Episode nos.: Season 1 Episodes 1 and 2
- Directed by: Rod Holcomb
- Written by: Frank Lupo; Stephen J. Cannell
- Production codes: 1000A and 1000B
- Original air date: January 23, 1983

Episode chronology
← Previous —	Next → "Children of Jamestown"

"Mexican Slayride" is the feature-length pilot episode of the action adventure television series The A-Team. The pilot aired in its complete form originally, airing in North America on January 23, 1983. In syndication the pilot has been cut up into two parts, creating two episodes.

== Plot ==
Newspaper reporter, Amy Allen seeks out The A-Team — a commando unit from the Vietnam War convicted of a crime they did not commit in 1972 and now working on the side of the law as mercenaries — to rescue one of her fellow reporters who has been kidnapped by Mexican outlaws. The A-Team, consisting of Col. John "Hannibal" Smith, Lt. Templeton "The Faceman" Peck ("Face"), and Sgt. Bosco "B.A." Baracus are being chased by Colonel Lynch, who has Amy followed as she works her way towards hiring the team. Despite Lynch's interference and several chases, Face manages to release the fourth member of the A-Team, Capt. H.M. "Howling Mad" Murdock, from the psychiatric hospital and scam a Gulfstream jet. Rendering B.A. unconscious due to his fear of flying, they travel with Amy to Mexico in a plane piloted by their fearless but clinically insane pilot, Murdock.

During the start of the flight, the original broadcast version features a soundalike version of The Rolling Stones hit "Jumpin' Jack Flash". On the DVD version, this is changed to a generic track for copyright reasons.

In Mexico, the team discovers that Amy's reporter friend has been kidnapped by a marijuana cultivator and gang leader named Malavita Valdez. Face and Murdock acquire a crop duster and ammonia, which they use to spray the marijuana fields and destroy the crops. The A-Team build an armored bus and drive the gang leader and his gang out of the village. While chasing the gang, the A-Team are ambushed by Mexican guerrillas who are friendly towards the gang leader.

With the A-Team captured by the Mexican gang leader, they escape when Hannibal knocks out one of the guards, and they attempt to flee by truck but are chased down by the guerrillas. Luckily for the A-Team, local villagers come to help them, led by Murdock and Face, who had evaded capture previously. They come out and ambush the guerrillas, allowing the A-Team to get on an airplane and get back home. After the escape, Amy Allen expresses her desire to join the A-Team. She effectively blackmails her way onto the team promising to put a positive light on their exploits in her articles.

== Cast ==
=== Regular characters ===
"Mexican Slayride" introduces the following regular The A-Team characters:

Files on (clockwise from top): John "Hannibal" Smith, Bosco "B.A." Baracus, Col. Lynch and Templeton "Faceman" Peck.

- George Peppard as Col. John "Hannibal" Smith

Leader of the A-Team. Part of show's main cast for the rest of the series.

- Tim Dunigan as Lt. Templeton "Faceman" Peck

Conman of the team. Replaced after the pilot episode by Dirk Benedict for the rest of the show's run.

- Mr. T as Sgt. Bosco Albert "B.A." Baracus

Strong man and mechanic of the team. Also known as Bad Attitude. Part of show's main cast for the rest of the series.

- Dwight Schultz as Capt. H.M. "Howling Mad" Murdock

The clinically insane pilot of the team. Part of show's main cast for the rest of the series.

- Melinda Culea as Amy Amanda "Triple A" Allen

The reporter who assists the A-Team during the show's first season and the first half of the second season.

- William Lucking as Col. Lynch

The team's main antagonist.

=== Guest starring roles ===
- Sergio Calderón as Malavita Valdez
- William Windom as Al Massey
- Enrique Lucero as Col. Flores
- Ron Palillo as Reporter
- Melody Anderson as Avon - Airplane Salesgirl

== Reception ==
=== Reviews ===
"Much effort has gone into putting together a cast of colorful characters, but except for Mr. Peppard, who establishes a goodhumoredly hard-boiled team leader, the rest, including the formidable Mr. T. as B.A., display more color than character. Directorial control of the internationally undistinguished cast is lax. Dwight Schultz overacts like mad as the crazy pilot, and that Mexican bandit leader (Sergio Calderon) turns in a performance that seems aimed at offending the Mexican-American Anti-Defamation League, if there is one."

—Walter Goodman, The New York Times, January 21, 1983, p. 27.

"THE A-TEAM, ITV's new comedy and violence show, is already a hit in America and is likely to become a cult here. The first episode was a 90-minute special which combined (with that lurid enthusiasm only Americans can muster) every blockbuster movie and TV adventure series in living memory into a single package. And it did so brilliantly; the politics that underlie this story of a group of Vietnam veterans turned desperadoes may be dangerous, but it's an exhilarating show to watch."

—Mary Harron, New Statesman (UK), July 29, 1983, volume 106, p. 133.

== Production ==
=== "Part 1" and "Part 2" ===
To be aired on television in syndication, the pilot had to be cut up in two separate episodes of approximately 40 to 45 minutes. As such, they are referred to as two distinct episodes, namely; "Mexican Slayride: Part 1" and "Mexican Slayride: Part 2". As the pilot episode itself is the combination of these two parts and was originally aired such, the pilot is kept intact on the DVD boxset of season 1.

=== The role of "Face" ===
The part of Face, best known as being played by Dirk Benedict throughout the series, is played in the pilot by actor Tim Dunigan. The episode originally had no introductory theme and credits like later episodes of The A-Team, but in syndication, the season 1 introduction is tagged on, with a segment depicting Tim Dunigan as Face replacing the part of Dirk Benedict. The DVD boxset of season 1 features the pilot in its original version, without introduction.

=== The character of Murdock ===
When NBC executives first reviewed the pilot episode of The A-Team, they were not enthused with the character of Murdock, whom they found too over-the-top. His character was either to be scaled down or removed altogether. When the pilot was shown to a test audience, they favored Murdock out of all the other characters. Per Dwight Schultz's account in "Bring Back... The A-Team" - a show meant to reunite the surviving cast members of the show in 2006 - whenever Murdock appeared the audience showed their approval by dialing their test dials all the way to their maximum, to the surprise of the executives. Schultz recounted the story again on the Dutch talk show Jensen! in 2007.

== Relevance to The A-Team series ==
As the pilot episode this episode introduces a number of concepts into the A-Team series:

- The crime they "didn't commit" and "Col. Morrison":

In this episode, Amy's colleague explains to her the A-Team's "crime", namely the robbing of the bank of Hanoi during the closing days of the war under the order of a Col. Morrison. These orders could not be verified because Col. Morrison died in an enemy shelling while the A-Team were on their mission. The death of Col. Morrison and this mission is referred to extensively in the opening three episodes of the show's fifth season, dealing with the team's court martial. Throughout the rest of the series, the team's military antagonists would occasionally make reference to the team's crime, but the exact nature of it was rarely mentioned until the fifth season.

Hannibal in his Aquamaniac suit.

- The use of Hannibal in disguise to learn about prospective clients, most notably as "Mr. Lee":

A common device used to weed out the actual clients from government agents, this tactic would be referenced throughout the show, sometimes referring directly to a "Mr. Lee" (and his being the owner of a laundromat), who is first introduced here. Other disguises have Hannibal dress up as a bus driver or as a bum (as he also does in this episode).

- Hannibal's acting career, most notably as "The Aquamaniac":

George Peppard portrays Hannibal Smith in The Aquamaniac for the first time in this pilot episode. The role is referred to numerous times throughout the rest of the series. A scene shot with Hannibal in the Aquamaniac costume is included in the opening credits for the first season.

- The phrase "on the jazz":

The term "on the jazz" is first used in this episode by B.A. to describe to Amy Allen the adrenaline kick Hannibal receives from the team's adventures. In following episodes it is referred to when civilians question the seemingly insane risks the team takes or the tactics they employ. With the departure of Amy Allen from the show in the second season, the term was largely dropped.

- B.A.'s fear of flying:

B.A.'s fear of flying is first introduced in this episode and is referenced time and time again when the team uses a plane in its missions. It is notably referenced, among other occurrences.

== References to other media ==
- King Kong, the 1933 film, is mentioned by Col. Lynch.
- The Ten Commandments (1956), this movie is referenced when the A-Team escapes from Col. Lynch on the studio lot by splitting open the fake ocean used for the film.
- Jaws, the Universal Studios tour recreation of the 1975 film's set can be seen in the background during the chase on the studio lot.
- Quincy, M.E., (1976-1983) is mentioned by one of Col. Lynch's men when he informs his commanding officer that he crashed into "Quincy's living room" while pursuing the A-Team on the studio lot.
- E.T. The Extra-Terrestrial (1982) is referenced by Murdock.

== In Pop Culture ==
- The cocktail, "Mexican Slayride," is named after this episode. It is a specific type of boilermaker made by pouring a shot of Captain Morgan's Spiced Rum into a pint of Negra Modelo.
