= The A-Team (film) =

2010 action comedy film by Joe Carnahan

- Theatrical release poster
- Directed by: Joe Carnahan
- Written by: Joe Carnahan; Brian Bloom; Skip Woods
- Based on: The A-Team by: Stephen J. Cannell; Frank Lupo
- Produced by: Stephen J. Cannell; Tony Scott; Spike Seldin; Jules Daly; Alex Young; Iain Smith
- Starring: Liam Neeson; Bradley Cooper; Quinton Jackson; Sharlto Copley; Jessica Biel; Patrick Wilson
- Cinematography: Mauro Fiore
- Edited by: Roger Barton; Jim May
- Music by: Alan Silvestri
- Production companies: Dune Entertainment; Top Cow Productions; Scott Free Productions
- Distributed by: 20th Century Fox
- Release date: June 11, 2010
- Running time: 118 minutes
- Country: United States
- Language: English
- Budget: $100–110 million
- Box office: $177.2 million

The A-Team is a 2010 American action comedy film based on the 1980s television series of the same name created by Frank Lupo and Stephen J. Cannell. Directed by Joe Carnahan and written by Carnahan, Brian Bloom, and Skip Woods, the film stars Liam Neeson, Bradley Cooper, Jessica Biel, Quinton Jackson, Sharlto Copley, and Patrick Wilson. The film tells the story of a Special Forces team who, imprisoned for a crime they did not commit, escapes and sets out to clear their names. The film was produced by Cannell, Tony Scott, and (as executive producer) his brother Ridley Scott.

The film had been in development since the mid-1990s having gone through a number of writers and story ideas and being put on hold a number of times. Neeson, Cooper, and the rest of the cast joined in summer 2009, and filming took place around Canada later that year. The film was theatrically released on June 11, 2010, by 20th Century Fox. It received mixed reviews from critics, who praised the cast and action sequences but criticized the script. A sequel was initially anticipated, but as the film underperformed at the box office, grossing $177 million worldwide against its $110 million budget, plans were scrapped.

== Plot ==
U.S. Army Special Forces Ranger John "Hannibal" Smith escapes from corrupt Federal Police officers working for renegade General Javier Tuco in Mexico, and returns to rescue his friend Templeton "Face" Peck with help from fellow Ranger B.A. Baracus. The trio evade Tuco's pursuit in B.A.'s modified GMC Vandura, stopping at an Army hospital to recruit a pilot H.M. "Howling Mad" Murdock who flies them off in a medical helicopter. In an ensuing dogfight Tuco's helicopter is lured into American airspace and shot down.

Eight years later, in Iraq, Hannibal is contacted by CIA Special Activities Division operative Lynch, who assigns them on a black operation to recover U.S. Treasury plates and over $1 billion in cash slated to move out of Baghdad. Hannibal's commanding officer, General Morrison, reluctantly consents to the operation. Face's former girlfriend, Defense Criminal Investigative Service Captain Charissa Sosa, tries to discourage the team from getting the plates. The team succeeds but on return to base, both the money and Morrison's vehicle are destroyed by Brock Pike and his men from the private security firm Black Forest. Without proof Morrison authorized the mission, Hannibal, Face, Murdock, and B.A. are court-martialed, sentenced to ten years in separate supermax prisons, and dishonorably discharged while Sosa is demoted to lieutenant.

Six months later, Lynch visits Hannibal in prison to tell him Pike is selling the plates with an Arab backer. Hannibal, already tracking Pike, makes a deal with Lynch: full reinstatement and clean records for his team in return for the plates. Hannibal escapes and breaks out Face, B.A., and Murdock. The reunited team hijacks a C-130 which is destroyed by pursuing Reaper UCAVs. The team escapes in an M8 light tank using airdrop parachutes and recoil from the main gun. The team discovers that Pike's backer is a disguised General Morrison, who stole the plates with Lynch and Pike, double-crossed Lynch, then faked his own death. Lynch orders an airstrike which kills Morrison while the team escapes.

Hannibal meets Sosa on a container ship in Port of Los Angeles to exchange "Morrison" and the plates. Pike and Lynch blow up the ship and B.A., forgoing his pacifist ideals, kills Pike as he pursues Face. Hannibal lures Lynch into a container to get him to shoot Murdock who is impersonating Morrison. Believing that he killed Morrison, Lynch admits to stealing the plates and is arrested by Sosa. CIA agents led by a separate "Lynch" claim custody of the original. The team is arrested for escaping from federal prison. Sosa, reinstated as a captain, promises to help and kisses Face. Entering a prison van, Face opens his mouth, revealing a handcuff key Sosa exchanged with him during their kiss.

Epilogue: "Still wanted by the government, they survive as soldiers of fortune. If you have a problem, if no one else can help, and if you can find them, maybe you can hire...the A-Team."

== Cast ==
- Liam Neeson as Col. John "Hannibal" Smith
- Bradley Cooper as Lt. Templeton "Face" Peck
- Jessica Biel as Charissa Sosa
- Quinton "Rampage" Jackson as Bosco "B.A." Baracus
- Sharlto Copley as Capt. H.M. "Howling Mad" Murdock
- Patrick Wilson as Vance Burress / Agent Lynch
- Gerald McRaney as General Russell Morrison
- Henry Czerny as Director McCready
- Yul Vazquez as General Javier Tuco
- Brian Bloom as Brock Pike. Bloom was also a writer on the film.
- Maury Sterling as Gammons
- Omari Hardwick as Chop Shop Jay
- Terry Chen as Ravech
- C. Ernst Harth as Crematorium Attendant
- Corey Burton as Narrator
- Jon Hamm as Other Lynch (uncredited)

In a post credits scene, original series actors Dirk Benedict (Face) and Dwight Schultz (Murdock) have cameos with their film equivalents Bradley Cooper and Sharlto Copley. Benedict plays Face's fellow tanning bed client, credited as "Pensacola Prisoner Milt", and Schultz plays the German neurologist who examines Murdock. These scenes are integrated in the film properly in the Extended cut.

== Production ==
=== Locations and filming ===
The entire film was shot at various locations in Canada including Kamloops, Vancouver, Cache Creek and Ashcroft, British Columbia, with much of the studio works being done at Mammoth Studios. Other footage was included as well, such as aerial shots of the Cologne train station (though erroneously referred to as Frankfurt Central Station in the movie) as well as an aerial shot of the Frankfurt skyline. Canadian Forces Base Cold Lake is also featured in the German escape scene where a number of base buildings and landmarks are clearly visible, as is the false canopy painted under the CF-18s. The Royal Canadian Air Force along with some USMC squadrons are the only Hornet users to have the false canopy painted on the bottom. American markings were digitally added later. The Hawaii Mars Martin Mars water bomber, based at Sproat Lake, British Columbia, is also used in one scene of the movie to cross the Atlantic.

=== Development ===
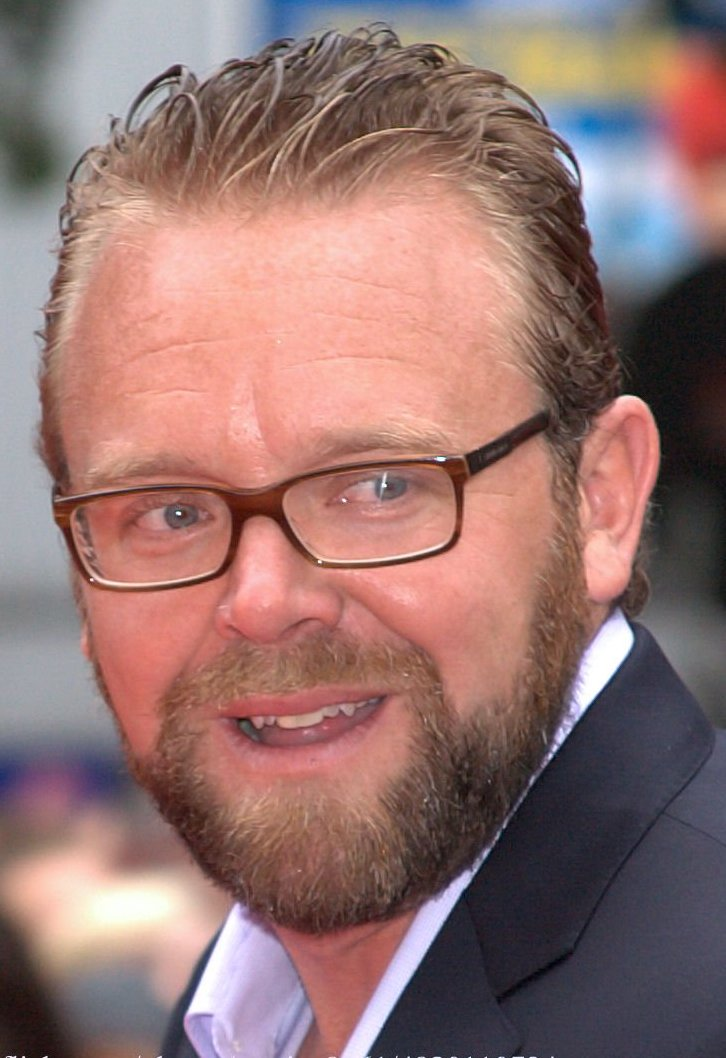
Joe Carnahan at the film's premiere.

The film had been in development since the mid-1990s, going through a number of writers and story ideas, and being put on hold a number of times. Producer Stephen J. Cannell hoped to update the setting, perhaps using the Gulf War as part of the backstory. John Singleton was initially assigned to direct, but in October 2008 he pulled out of the project. When Singleton was still attached to the project as director, Ice Cube was approached for the role of B.A. Baracus.

Initially greenlit on a production budget of $80 million, the final cost of the film was $110 million, which came down to around $100 million after tax credits.

=== Casting ===
In June 2009, Variety revealed that Liam Neeson was in negotiations with 20th Century Fox to star as Hannibal Smith, and Bradley Cooper announced to MTV News that he would be playing the role of Templeton Peck after he first denied the rumors saying that he was not involved and insisted that he had not seen any script.

On August 26, 2009, MMAjunkie.com reported that mixed martial arts fighter Quinton Jackson would play the role of B.A. Baracus in the upcoming film, but this was later denied by a representative for Jackson. In September 2009, The Vancouver Sun suggested that Jackson has been attached to the role and was postponing his fight at UFC 107 with Rashad Evans due to filming for The A-Team. Filming started in Vancouver in late 2009, and Jackson's involvement was then confirmed.

On September 15, 2009, Variety confirmed the casting of Neeson, Cooper and Jackson. They additionally reported that Sharlto Copley and Jessica Biel were in final negotiations to join the cast. Copley would be playing the role of H.M. Murdock and Biel would be playing the ex-lover of Face who is a disillusioned and ruthless Army officer in charge of pursuing the team. 20th Century Fox later confirmed that Copley and Biel were cast in the film.

The first official pictures of Neeson, Cooper, Copley and Jackson in character included one which features the iconic van in the background.

On October 30, 2009, Dwight Schultz confirmed that he had filmed a cameo scene for the movie. This news was followed on November 23, 2009, that Dirk Benedict would also make a cameo. Schultz and Benedict played Howling Mad Murdock and Templeton Peck respectively in the original series. Mr. T, the original BA Baracus, did not appear in the film. In an interview with Wendy Williams, he said he did not like doing a cameo appearance in a film based on the original series he once did.

== Soundtrack ==
The soundtrack album of The A-Team featuring original score composed by Alan Silvestri was released on June 21, 2010, by Varèse Sarabande.

Songs used in the film are:

- "House of Pain" by The Game
- "Shut Up" by Trick Daddy
- "Trio Para Enamorados (Trio for Lovers)" by Jorge Calandrelli
- "You Spin Me Round (Like a Record)" (Sung onscreen by Sharlto Copley)
- "A-Team Blastoff Suite" by Tom Morello
- "I Got Mine" by The Black Keys
- "I've Been Lonely for So Long" by Frederick Knight
- "The Washington Post" by John Philip Sousa
- "I Don't Want to Change Your Mind" by Wildlife
- "My Girl Has Rosenmand" written by Johannes Brahms and performed by Peter Schreier and Konrad Ragossnig
- "The Little Drummer Boy" written by Harry Simeone, Katherine K. Davis and Henry Onorati
- "Anarchy in the U.K." by Sex Pistols
- "I Ran 6 Miles" by Gary Sredzienski
- "Reelin' In the Years" written by Steely Dan

== Marketing ==
=== Comics ===
In February 2010, it was announced a series of comics for the movie would be released beginning in March. Written by Carnahan and Chuck Dixon, the series, The A-Team: War Stories is a prelude to the film, featuring one-shots focusing each on Hannibal, Face, BA, and Murdock. A second series, The A-Team: Shotgun Wedding, is a tie-in to the film by showing an all-new adventure set after the quartet escaped. Film director Joe Carnahan and Tom Waltz collaborated to pen the series.

Jazwares released a line of action figures featuring the four main characters, plus the GMC Vandura.

=== Video game ===
An application for the iPhone was released as part of the marketing blitz for the film. The A-Team application is a side-scrolling, third person, action shooter game. Produced by RealNetworks the game includes voice-overs from B.A. Baracus.

== Release ==
The film premiered in Los Angeles on Thursday June 3, 2010, at Grauman's Chinese Theatre on Hollywood Boulevard. Liam Neeson arrived in The A-Team custom Chevrolet G20 van; Bradley Cooper and Sharlto Copley rode in on a real U.S. Army tank. The film opened nationwide on June 11, 2010.

The film premiered in the United Kingdom on July 27, 2010, before going on general release the next day. The event was attended by the four team members along with Jessica Biel, and the A-Team van.

=== Home media ===
The film was released on December 14, 2010, on DVD and Blu-ray. It was released on DVD and Blu-ray on October 27 in Australia and on November 29, 2010, in the UK. An extended cut was also released, pushing the running time to 133 minutes. Two of the most noteworthy additions in the extended cut were the two cameo scenes of the original Face and Murdock, which were pushed back after the end credits in the original cut due to pacing.

== Reception ==
=== Box office ===
The film fell slightly short of expectations for its opening weekend, earning $26 million, as opposed to the initially predicted $30–35 million. The film opened behind The Karate Kid, which took in $56 million. The film opened in the UK/Ireland on July 28, 2010 and came in at No. 3 at the box office with a first weekend haul of $5.6 million. As of August 26, 2010, The A-Team had taken over $77.2 million at the U.S. box office, and $100 million internationally, for a worldwide total of over $177.2 million.

=== Critical response ===
On Rotten Tomatoes, the film has an approval rating of 48% based on 217 reviews with an average rating of 5.40/10. The site's critical consensus reads, "The A-Team assembles a top-rate cast only to ditch the show's appealingly silly premise for explosive yet muddled blockbuster filmmaking." On Metacritic, the film has a score of 47 out of 100 based on 37 critics, indicating "mixed or average reviews". Audiences polled by CinemaScore gave the film an average grade of "B+" on an A+ to F scale.

Owen Gleiberman of Entertainment Weekly says of the film: "It's trash so compacted it glows". Richard Corliss of Time magazine calls the film "the best in a mediocre line-up of summer-action flicks". He goes on to say the film lacks "a coherent plot and complex characterization", though he does note that these qualities "are irrelevant to the genre". Peter Travers of Rolling Stone magazine calls the film, "big, loud, ludicrous and edited into visual incomprehension", but "pity the fool who lets that stand in the way of enjoying The A-Team". The Hollywood Reporter criticized the film's story, character development and logic, calling it "nearly writer-free", while the St. Petersburg Times was far more positive, calling the film "literally a blast" from start to finish, and praises it for "containing more thrills than the average shoot-em-up".

Film critic Roger Ebert of the Chicago Sun-Times said The A-Team is an incomprehensible mess, criticizing the film for being as shallow as the television series, which he describes as "punishment" when drawn out to a two-hour-long film. Stephen Whitty of The Star-Ledger complained the film makers remembered little more from the television series than a Dirty Dozen gimmick and compares the film to the "awful" Smokin' Aces by the same director.

German magazine Der Spiegel noted the grave factual errors encountered throughout the film; for example German border police speaking Norwegian and wearing Norwegian uniforms, or an aerial shot of a what is supposed to be Frankfurt am Main but prominently featuring Cologne Cathedral; the latter being that city's main landmark and over 150 km northwest of Frankfurt.

=== Comments by original cast ===
Dirk Benedict, who played Templeton "Faceman" Peck in the TV series, spoke of regretting his cameo, stating "You'll miss me if you blink. I kind of regret doing it because it's a non part. They wanted to be able to say, 'Oh yeah, the original cast are in it,' but we're not. It is three seconds. It's kind of insulting."

Mr. T, the original B. A. Baracus, was offered a cameo, but turned it down, feeling it would not be right for him to appear in the film if he did not play Baracus. In a 2010 interview with Script magazine, director Joe Carnahan claimed that Mr. T, after viewing scenes from the film, thought the final product was "the greatest thing in the world". After the premiere of the film Mr. T allegedly stated that he had become disillusioned and felt the story emphasized sex and violence, and that it was unfaithful to the original series. An attorney for Mr. T later stated that the actor had not yet seen the film and could not comment on it.

Dwight Schultz, who played "Howling Mad" Murdock on the TV series, issued a statement to his official fansite that the film "pays homage to the series while it eschews its essential working premise: a band of capable military brothers for hire determined to save underdog and usually poor civilians from scum. ... The team characters are sufficiently different and, with so many roles reversed from the original, one could say they are not really derivative, save for their names." He also noted that Sharlto Copley's Murdock "is faithful to the original, but at the same time is big screen twisted and right at home with the new team."

=== Accolades ===
Award	Category	Nominee	Result
IGN Awards	Best Action Movie	The A-Team	Nominated
Teen Choice Awards	Choice Summer Movie	The A-Team	Nominated
Taurus Awards	Hardest Hit	Brian Machleit (stunt double)	Won

== Cancelled sequel ==
Neeson, Cooper, Copley and Jackson originally expressed interest in doing a sequel. Joe Carnahan expressed interest in directing a sequel and said it would depend on DVD and Blu-ray sales and rentals. On March 10, 2011, Cooper stated that the film had not generated enough revenue for there to be a sequel. This was confirmed by Liam Neeson in a webchat. Neeson later commented in early 2012 that he understood why the film was not successful: "I watched it about two months ago and I found it a little confusing and I was in the thing. I just couldn’t figure out who was who and what’s been done to him and why, a little bit." Later in 2013 Carnahan said on his Twitter account: "For the record guys and as much as I appreciate all the A-TEAM love. There will NOT be a sequel. It didn't make enough $$$ and that's that."
