= List of The A-Team characters =

List of characters from the American TV show The A-Team

The A-Team. Clockwise from top: Murdock, B. A. Baracus, Hannibal and Faceman.

This article lists the characters created for the popular 1980s American action-adventure television series The A-Team and its 2010 film adaptation as well as other media appearances.

== The A-Team ==
=== John "Hannibal" Smith ===
Ex-United States Army Special Forces 5th Special Forces Group Lieutenant-Colonel/Colonel John "Hannibal" Smith (portrayed by George Peppard) is the leader of the A-Team. He is a brilliant tactician and a master of disguise. Hannibal is distinguished by his cigar smoking, black gloves, disguises, and his catch phrase, "I love it when a plan comes together." Always "on the jazz" (a phrase coined by B.A., meaning that Hannibal thrives on adventure and life-threatening situations), he seems to genuinely enjoy every situation they get into. He also works as an actor, playing monsters in low-budget horror movies.

The producers originally had James Coburn in mind to play the part of Hannibal, but it eventually went to Peppard. He is portrayed by Liam Neeson in the film adaptation and voiced by David Lodge in Lego Dimensions.

The character was partly inspired by Bo Gritz, a US Army Special Forces officer.

=== Templeton Arthur "Faceman" Peck ===
Ex-United States Army Special Forces 5th Special Forces Group First Lieutenant Templeton "Face(man)" Peck (portrayed by Tim Dunigan for the pilot and Dirk Benedict for all other appearances) was suave, smooth-talking, and popular with women. Serving as the team's con man and scrounger, he is able to get his hands on just about anything they need. He is Hannibal's second-in-command and arranges for supplies, equipment, and sensitive information using numerous scams and hustles. Raised in a Christian orphanage, Face has respect for the church. Amy and Murdock give some insight into Face's true character; while Face has a good heart, he fears commitment. In Season Five, Face's birth name is revealed to actually be Richard Bancroft; his father left him and his mother, who died shortly afterwards.

He is later portrayed by Bradley Cooper in the film adaptation and voiced by Sam Riegel in Lego Dimensions.

=== H.M. "Howling Mad" Murdock ===
Ex–United States Army Pilot Captain H. M. "Howling Mad" Murdock (portrayed by Dwight Schultz) was one of the best pilots in the Vietnam War, specializing in helicopters but adept at all aircraft. He is either mentally unstable or exceptionally good at pretending to be so. Although he was their pilot on the Hanoi bank raid, he was not officially part of the A-Team and so not tried by the military. Interned at a psychiatric hospital, he routinely escapes easily to accompany the A-Team on their missions. The symptoms of his "insanity" varies from episode to episode, but generally includes self-identification with fictional characters, hallucinations, and belief in the "intelligence" of inanimate objects, among others. He frequently refers to his invisible dog, "Billy." Unlike B.A., the initials "H.M." were never explained in terms of Murdock's actual name, and the nickname "Howlin' Mad" is simply attributed to him. He was permanently discharged from the hospital in the fifth season.

He is portrayed by Sharlto Copley in the film adaptation, where he also identifies himself as an Army Ranger.

Dwight Schultz reprised him in Lego Dimensions.

=== Bosco Albert "B.A." Baracus ===
Ex–United States Army Special Forces 5th Special Forces Group Sergeant First Class Bosco Albert "B.A." Baracus (portrayed by Mr. T) otherwise known as Scooter by his mother, is a highly skilled mechanic and the A-Team's regular Mr. Fix-It as well as being the team's master at arms. His character is basically that of the public persona of Mr. T himself. He is a skilled fighter and is easily aroused to anger, earning him the nickname "Bad Attitude". Despite his reputed attitude, he is a very nice guy at heart. He has a special fondness for children and never drinks alcohol, preferring milk instead. He is frequently perturbed by Murdock, whom he often refers to as a "crazy fool". He suffers an intense fear of flying, especially when the aircraft in question is flown by Murdock. This difficulty is often overcome by other members of the team drugging him, or otherwise rendering him unconscious, so he can be transported without objection; he has the unusual habit of falling on car horns when knocked out.

He is portrayed by Quinton "Rampage" Jackson in the film adaptation and by Dave Fennoy in Lego Dimensions.

=== Additional A-Team members ===
==== Amy Allen ====
Amy Amanda "Triple A" Allen (portrayed by Melinda Culea) was an intrepid reporter for the L.A. Courier paper who joined the team in its pilot episode. At the end of the pilot, Hannibal comments on how her initials are "Triple A", but while much of the publicity surrounding the series used this name, it was never really used again in the show itself, with a company set up by the Team in the first season episode "The Out-Of-Towners" called "Triple-A's" being its only other appearance in the actual series (and even this was only referenced visually, with no acknowledgment to it in the dialogue). The character's boss is Grant Eldridge (Philip Sterling), seen in the first half of the pilot, and in the first season episode "Holiday In The Hills". Amy has a best friend at the Courier, Zach (Ron Palillo), who is only seen in the pilot and never referred to again. Amy was written out of the show in the middle of the second season as a result of a conflict between Culea and the production team. After being featured prominently in the pilot story, the character had little impact in many of the following episodes causing Culea to become increasingly unhappy with the role and wanting more to do, such as taking part in the Team's frequent fights with bad guys. It's also said that the fact that George Peppard didn't like her, feeling that the show didn't need a female lead, also had an effect. There are conflicting reports over whether Culea eventually left on her own accord, or if she was fired as a result of her continual pushing for more to do in the show. The latter is the more commonly accepted reason, and an oft-cited tale is that Culea found out about her firing when she was given a script and found out she was not included in the episode. In replacement Tawnia Baker's first episode, "The Battle of Bel Air", Amy is reportedly "on foreign correspondent duty" in Jakarta.

She is voiced by Marisha Ray in Lego Dimensions.

==== Tawnia Baker ====
Tawnia Baker (misspelled as Tanya on a computer screen in the character's introductory episode "The Battle Of Bel Air"; portrayed by Marla Heasley) was a relatively short-lived second-season replacement for Amy during late 1983 – early 1984. She was also a reporter who had heard of the team through Amy and helped the A-Team out a few times, although she never fully incorporated herself into the team, as Amy had done (reflected by the fact that she was never added to the opening credits, and was not present in two stories, "Harder Than It Looks" and "Semi-Friendly Persuasion", during her time in the series). The character was dropped in "The Bend In The River", the feature-length second story of the third season, again said to be much to do with Peppard's insistence that the show didn't need a female character, but was given the dignity of being written out properly, as she married explorer Brian Leftcourt (Barry Van Dyke), whom the Team had rescued from river pirates in the Amazon, and went on a round-the-world-all-expenses-paid honeymoon. Marla Heasley had appeared in a small role previously in the second season, as Cherise in the episode "Bad Time on the Border".

==== Tia Fulbright ====
Tia Fulbright (portrayed by Tia Carrere) was the half-Vietnamese daughter of latter 4th season antagonist General Fullbright. She was inducted into the team in "The Sound of Thunder", the finale to season 4, after the death of her father and her own wanted status in Vietnam and illegal status in the US. However, Carrere's contractual obligations to General Hospital, made during a period when 5th season renewal for the series was uncertain, led to Tia vanishing from the story with no explanation or further mention.

==== Frankie "Dishpan Man" Santana ====
Frankie "Dishpan Man" Santana (portrayed by Eddie Velez) was a Puerto Rican special effects expert who helps the A-Team during the final season. He was blackmailed into joining the team by Gen. Stockwell after he and Murdock helped the team escape the firing squad. The character's early script name was Frankie Sanchez, which filtered through to a number of coverage material. The character was also often given the nickname "Dishpan Man" (or simply "Dishpan") in much of the series' coverage, but while he was introduced as this in the fifth season opener, itself called "Dishpan Man", this nickname was very seldom used afterwards in the actual series. Frankie is unique as he refers to Hannibal Smith by his first name 'Johnny' whilst the others would use his nickname Hannibal or his rank of Colonel. In "The Theory of Revolution" it is remarked that Frankie claimed to have served as a paratrooper although Murdock is skeptical of this given his unfamiliarity with the military 24hr time system. It is mentioned that he has a father in a nursing home in "Trial By Fire". Unlike Amy and Tawnia, Frankie makes full participation in action sequences and normally uses a Heckler and Koch P7 pistol.

== Military Police ==
Members of the Military Police would be led by different field commanders in apprehending the A-Team. While they often fail to catch them, the military police have on occasion arrested the criminals that the A-Team have defeated.

=== Colonel Lynch ===
United States Army Military Police Colonel Francis Lynch (portrayed by William Lucking) was the Commander of Fort Bragg, which housed the stockade from which the team escaped. The Colonel pursued them throughout the first season. (He was mentioned to still be in pursuit of the team at the start of the second season, though was never actually seen). He seemed to have a personal vendetta against the A-Team (arrogant, ambitious, and not particularly bright, he viewed the Team's escape as the biggest on-going blemish of his career) which, coupled with the fact that he never managed to capture them, led to his being taken off the case. He also made a surprise return to make one last effort at catching the team in the third season episode "Showdown!."

In the 2010 film adaptation, "Lynch" is revealed to be a moniker that many CIA agents take on. The most recent Lynch (revealed at the end to be Agent Vance Burress) is played by Patrick Wilson who intended to portray the role more seriously than Lucking's comedic character. For the film, the character is changed from the Wile E. Coyote-type Army colonel of the original series to a mysterious and sinister corrupt CIA SAD operative. Burress is ultimately revealed to be the one that framed the A-Team. Following Burress's arrest at the end of the film, Jon Hamm does an uncredited portrayal of an agent that takes him into CIA custody. When asked what his name is, the agent answers "Lynch."

In Lego Dimensions, Colonel Lynch (voiced by David Boat) appears and gives the players a quest to help him round up the B-Team.

==== Stewart ====
United States Army Military Police Captain Stewart (portrayed by James Beach and by Dean Santoro) is Lynch's Aide from "Mexican Slayride", "Holiday in the Hills" and "One More Time". He reports to Lynch about the activities of the Team, such as when Hannibal and B.A picked up Amy at her apartment in "Mexican Slayride" and when Lynch sent in an undercover operative to follow Amy in "Holiday in the Hills". He and Lynch arrested the Team in "One More Time".

=== Roderick Decker ===
United States Army Military Police Colonel Roderick Decker (portrayed by Lance LeGault) was the second Colonel who tried to catch the team. He was picked for the job because of his unorthodox warfare techniques (it was revealed that in Vietnam, he was known for blowing up Viet Cong hospitals). Decker and Hannibal had a past, having gotten into a brawl at an officers' club in Vietnam. Decker was much more ruthless than Lynch - carrying a .44 Magnum as his sidearm - but also always got outsmarted. He equally despises and respects the A-Team, and Smith in particular, for their ingenuity and teamwork. Decker reappears in the fifth season episode "Trial by Fire" to testify against the A-Team.

==== Crane ====
United States Army Military Police Captain Crane (portrayed by Carl Franklin) is Decker's right-hand man. He was much more naïve than Decker regarding the A-Team, and was often surprised at the team's ability to evade them.

=== Briggs ===
United States Army Military Police Colonel Briggs (portrayed by Charles Napier) was the third Colonel who tried to catch the team but only appeared in one early season 3 episode ("Fire") before Colonel Decker returned. In reality the character was a temporary, one-off replacement (he even has very similar look and mannerisms to Decker) while Lance LeGault was filming an episode of Magnum, P.I., in which he also had a recurring role.

==== Royce ====
United States Army Military Police Captain Royce (portrayed by W. K. Stratton) is Briggs's aide in "Fire" and who temporary became Lynch's Aide in his return appearance in "Showdown".

=== Harlan "Bull" Fullbright ===
United States Army Military Police General Harlan "Bull" Fullbright (portrayed by Jack Ging) is a General who, once again, was determined to capture the team. In the season four finale "The Sound of Thunder," he actually tracked down the team, but instead of turning them in, persuaded them to travel with him to Vietnam to try to find his long-lost offspring, not realizing he was being led into a trap; at the climax of the story the character is shot and killed. In his dying moments, Fullbright admitted to the team that he realized they were innocent as they were willing to help him at any cost despite them being criminals on the run from him.

Ging had appeared in two other roles in earlier seasons: as SWAT Captain Stark in the episode "A Small and Deadly War" (season 1, episode 4) and as Border Patrol Lt. Taggart in the episode "Bad Time on the Border" (season 2, episode 4).

==== Case ====
United States Army Military Police Sergeant Case (portrayed by Rod Stryker) is Decker's temporary aide in "Body Slam" and later Fullbright's main aide in "Mind Games", "Members Only" and "Mission of Peace".

== Supporting characters ==
=== Hunt Stockwell ===
Hunt Stockwell (portrayed by Robert Vaughn) is a former United States Army General, CIA agent, and the A-Team's boss during the final season, who blackmailed the team into working on an undefined number of top-secret government missions in return for their supposed eventual pardon. He oversees an intelligence gathering network whose size is unknown.

It is implied that he has operatives in many parts of the world. He also apparently has the ability to keep the military police and other law enforcement agencies from continuing to hunt the A-Team as they are working for him. By extension, Stockwell also has access to the resources to provide the team with a house in Washington, D.C. as well as whatever travel documents, currency, weapons and equipment they may require for an assignment. Nothing is known about his background and/or how he is connected to the intelligence community and to whom he is accountable. It is known that he must report in on a daily basis to the U.S. President or his entire network will disappear. This may imply that he answers only to the President. He is mysterious, unpredictable, manipulative, cold and in many respects emotionally detached.

The team often feels that he is just using them for his own gains, leading them on with undefined terms for their supposed pardon (in the episode "Alive At Five," Face tires of this and plans to go at it alone, although eventually decides to stay). Often Stockwell will send the team out on various missions, usually contacting them from his luxury jet, but occasionally will take a more hands-on approach (such as the episode "Point Of No Return," when he leads the rest of the team to Hong Kong to find the missing Hannibal).

His catch phrase was "(I'm going to do this...) My way."

=== Carla ===
Carla (portrayed by Judith Ledford) is General Stockwell's assistant and often the target of Face (and Frankie)'s unwanted advances. Seen for the first half of the final season, in the last few episodes several other assistants appeared in her place (Carla appears for the last time in "Point Of No Return").

=== Samuel Morrison ===
United States Army Colonel Samuel Morrison (portrayed by Guy Christopher) is the A-Team's commanding officer during the Vietnam War. Morrison ordered them to rob the Bank of Hanoi to help bring the war to an end. They succeeded in their mission, but on their return to their base four days after the end of the war, they discovered that Morrison had been murdered by the National Front for the Liberation of Vietnam, or Viet Cong, and that his headquarters had been burned to the ground. This meant that the proof that the A-Team members were acting under orders had been destroyed, and they were sent to prison by a military court. They were sent to Fort Bragg, from which they quickly escaped before standing trial.

In the 2010 film adaptation, Gerald McRaney portrays General Russell "Russ" Morrison. This updated version of the character is a close friend of Hannibal. Morrison describes Hannibal and his team as the greatest tactical asset he has ever had at his disposal. This seems to suggest that Hannibal and his men have been in Iraq for a significant amount of time under Morrison's general command. Morrison reluctantly authorizes a covert mission for the team to steal the U.S. Treasury plates that Iraqi insurgents use to print currency. This currency, if released into the economy could do serious damage; this apparently is the reason Morrison authorizes the mission. Morrison wishes Hannibal "good hunting, my friend" and says that they will share a drink to celebrate if they succeed. Because the mission is covert, no written orders were ever recorded and for all appearances it is a renegade operation. The mission is successful, but when the team returns to base, the money, plates, and Morrison's vehicle are destroyed by Brock Pike and his men from Black Forest, a private security team that does not answer to military jurisdiction. Because there is no evidence otherwise; the team is tried and convicted in a military court of conducting a rogue operation and is sentenced to 10 years in prison and Charissa Sosa is demoted. The team is subsequently broken up sent to different prisons. When the team reclaims the plates and kidnaps Pike's backer who is simply described as an Arab, they learn that he is actually General Morrison, who worked with Lynch and Pike to steal the plates, but then teamed up with Pike to double-cross Lynch and fake his death. When Lynch learns that the team has Morrison, he orders an air strike and kills Morrison. The A-Team lets Lynch think that Morrison is still alive and uses this fiction to draw out Lynch.

== Film characters ==
=== Charissa Sosa ===
Captain Charissa Sosa (portrayed by Jessica Biel) is Face's former lover, who left him after he became serious about their relationship, though through interaction in the film it becomes apparent that she told people in the interim that he was the one who left. Sosa returns three years later as a DCIS captain and warns Face not to steal the plates used to manufacture currency. Deeply angered when his defiance leads to her demotion to first lieutenant, Sosa pursues the team for the majority of the film. In the film's dénouement, she is promoted once again to captain. Angered by her superior arresting the A-Team for breaking out of prison to clear their names, she kisses Face and sneaks a key into his mouth for them to escape.

=== Brock Pike ===
Brock Pike (portrayed by Brian Bloom) is a leader of the private security firm Black Forest. He and his men frame the A-Team by destroying the money and plates they stole, along with General Morrison's vehicle. It is later revealed that he worked with General Morrison and Lynch to steal the plates, but then teamed up with Morrison to double-cross Lynch and fake Morrison's death. During Pike's chase on the A-Team, he ends up caught by Sosa. Following Sosa's attempt to interrogate him, Pike ends up in Lynch's custody. Upon Lynch learning about him faking Morrison's death while threatening him, Pike agrees to help Lynch eliminate the A-Team and Morrison. When he gets impatient to the progress of the rogue CIA agents and decides to kill them himself, B.A. drops him on his head and breaks his neck.

== Main cast timeline ==
Role	Medium						
Role	Series						Film (2010)
Role	Pilot (1983)	Season 1 (1983)	Season 2 (1983–1984)	Season 3 (1984–1985)	Season 4 (1985–1986)	Season 5 (1986–1987)	Film (2010)
Col. John "Hannibal" Smith	George Peppard	George Peppard	George Peppard	George Peppard	George Peppard	George Peppard	Liam Neeson
Lt. Templeton "Faceman" Peck	Tim Dunigan	Dirk Benedict	Dirk Benedict	Dirk Benedict	Dirk Benedict	Dirk Benedict	Bradley Cooper
Capt. H. M. "Howling Mad" Murdock	Dwight Schultz	Dwight Schultz	Dwight Schultz	Dwight Schultz	Dwight Schultz	Dwight Schultz	Sharlto Copley
Sgt. Bosco Albert "B. A." (Bad Attitude) Baracus	Mr. T	Mr. T	Mr. T	Mr. T	Mr. T	Mr. T	Quinton Jackson
Amy Amanda "Triple A" Allen	Melinda Culea	Melinda Culea	Melinda Culea				
Tawnia Baker			Marla Heasley	Marla Heasley			
Frankie "Dishpan Man" Santana						Eddie Velez	
Gen. Hunt Stockwell						Robert Vaughn	
Capt. Charissa Sosa							Jessica Biel
Agent Vance "Lynch" Burress							Patrick Wilson
Brock Pike							Brian Bloom
