= B. A. Baracus =

A-Team TV show character

Bosco "B.A." Baracus
- The A-Team character
- Bosco "B. A." Baracus as he appears in the opening credits
- First appearance: "Mexican Slayride"
- Created by: Frank Lupo & Stephen J. Cannell
- Portrayed by: Mr. T (TV series); Quinton Jackson (film); TBC (TV series reboot)
- Voiced by: Dave Fennoy

In-universe information
- Aliases: B.A. Bad Attitude
- Gender: Male
- Title: Sergeant First Class
- Family: Mrs. Baracus (mother)
- Awards: Silver Star; Army Commendation Medal; National Defense Service Medal; Armed Forces Expeditionary Medal; Vietnam Service Medal; Vietnam Campaign Medal

Sergeant Bosco Albert "B.A." (Bad Attitude) Baracus /bəˈrækəs/, played by Mr. T, is a recurring character and one of the main protagonists of the 1980s action-adventure television series The A-Team. B. A. Baracus appeared on The A-Team from the series beginning in 1983 until its cancellation in 1987. He is arguably the breakout character of the series and has become a cult icon worldwide.

In the 2010 film version, B. A. Baracus was played by mixed martial artist Quinton "Rampage" Jackson.

== Fictional character biography ==
The A-Team is a group of ex-United States Army Special Forces 5th Special Forces Group soldiers who were wrongly convicted of a crime during the Vietnam War. Managing to escape from the Military Police, they fled to Los Angeles where, as fugitives, the A-Team works as soldiers of fortune, using their military training to fight oppression and injustice. B. A., along with Hannibal Smith, Templeton "Faceman" Peck, and H. M. Murdock make up the A-Team.

In the pilot episode, "Mexican Slayride", a reporter colleague of Amy Allen describes him as "Bosco Baracus. Known as B. A. for 'bad attitude.' The man is a mechanical genius. He also has one of the worst conduct records in the army. He likes to slug officers." A rough-and-tough fighter, the character of B. A. Baracus is basically that of the public persona of Mr. T himself. He is known for his trademark African Mandinka warrior hairstyle (often mistaken for a frohawk hairstyle), and his gold jewelry.

While the other members of the team regularly resort to disguises, scams and subterfuge to achieve their goals, B. A.'s distinctive appearance and confrontational attitude usually lead to a more direct approach to problems, which often involve either his skills at hand-to-hand combat (boxing, wrestling), or his mechanical talents.

He is a highly skilled mechanic and has an amazing talent for making impressive machinery out of just about any ordinary parts. He received his initial training in the Jamaican Defense Force. In Season 2, Hannibal once said to B. A., "With a pair of pliers and a little time, you could fix anything but dinner." He is an excellent fighter and is invaluable in hand-to-hand combat. Because of his massive size and strength, he has a unique fighting tactic, which may involve grabbing his opponents, lifting them over his head, and hurling them in the air. He is easily angered to the point of rage, and often greets people with a growl or a snarl. He is most often upset by Murdock and frequently addresses him with the phrase "You crazy fool!", although Murdock is usually unfazed by B. A.'s gruffness. In fact, B. A. and Murdock are very close friends, with almost the relationship of frequently quarrelling brothers, as can be seen in "Curtain Call", the Season 2 finale, where Murdock is shot and B. A. is desperate to save him. Despite B. A.'s reputed attitude, he is a kind person who has a special fondness for children, occasionally working at a youth center teaching sports to the children. It is divulged in a Season 2 episode that he is from Chicago, another parallel with the real life Mr. T.

A teetotaler, B. A. did not touch alcohol, preferring milk instead. He suffers from pteromerhanophobia, an intense fear of flying, especially when the pilot is Murdock. (It was never explained how he managed to join the Army Special Forces with this fear, as all Special Forces members are required to be airborne qualified.) He typically exclaims, "I ain't gettin' on no plane!" This difficulty is often overcome by other members of the team drugging him, knocking him unconscious, or, as in one episode, hypnotizing him, so he can be transported without objection. In the Season 1 episode "The Beast from the Belly of a Boeing", he is on a plane pretending to be a maintenance technician with Murdock when the plane suddenly takes off. He immediately falls into a catatonic state while Murdock tries to revive him. Furthermore, in two episodes "The Sound of Thunder" and "Quarterback Sneak" B. A. hops onto a helicopter which is piloted by Murdock, although he is said to have gone catatonic during the plane ride in "The Sound of Thunder".

In the Season 4 episode "Lease with an Option to Die", he temporarily overcomes his fear of flying when he learns his mother is hurt. In that episode his mother and her friends in Chicago are under the impression that he is the leader of The A-Team, which Hannibal and the others go along with. He submits to her authority, and the team is highly amused when his mother calls him by his childhood nickname of "Scooter". In the Season 2 episode "Diamonds 'n Dust", we learn that B. A.'s father was once beaten up by three men and almost died, giving B. A. a special understanding with the client, Toby, a woman whose father has been murdered.

As revealed in a few episodes, B. A. and Murdock share the same blood type, AB negative, the rarest type. This was a plot device for finding one of them urgently when a transfusion was needed for the other.

B. A. drives a customized 1983 GMC Van, painted black and grey with a red stripe, black and red rims, and a rooftop spoiler. B. A. is extremely protective of his van, and becomes furious if it gets any damage. He prefers to drive the van himself although the other members of the team frequently drive the van for a variety of reasons, generally when B. A. was otherwise indisposed. He often says, "Nobody drives my van, but me!" He appears to also apply this principle to other vehicles, such as in "The Trouble with Harry", where he insists on driving Hulk Hogan's limousine to follow a young friend from the center he helps at.

=== The meaning of "B. A." ===
As revealed in the pilot episode, "B. A." stands for the nickname of "bad attitude", although many viewers perceived this to be a euphemism for the phrase "bad ass" which would not have been accepted by television censors at the time. In the Season 4 episode "Lease with an Option to Die", we learn from his mother that his childhood nickname was Scooter, which he detests and only allows his mother to use.

Although not canon, Mr. T has stated that in terms of his Christian faith, B. A. now stands for "Born Again".

In syndicated versions of The A-Team aired in Hispanic and Spanish speaking countries, such as Mexico, B. A. Baracus is translated as Mario Baracus. In Spain, it was translated to M. A. Barracus, in part for the nickname "Bad Attitude" which translates into "Mala Actitud". In the French version, the meaning of the initials was dodged altogether since the character is constantly called "Barracuda" after the large and ferocious fish species of the same name, and even his second name of Baracus is rarely used. In the Italian version, he is named P. E. Baracus, where P. E. stands for "Pessimo Elemento", translated literally as "Very Bad Element". The Polish translation used the original initials, where B. A. stood for "Bardzo Arogancki", translated as "Very Arrogant".

For the 2010 movie, which was sponsored by British Airways, B. A.'s initials were jokingly changed to "British Airways" in some marketing. This was considered cynical by fans, as it is well known that B. A. refuses to travel on aircraft.

=== Name in other countries ===
- In Latin-American Spanish-speaking countries, he is known as "Mario Baracus," while in Spain, he is M. A., for Mala Actitud, a literal translation of the original
- Italy – his moniker is P. E. for "Pessimo Elemento" ("Very Bad Element");
- Russia – he is known as D. N., Durnoi Nrav – the Russian equivalent of "Bad Attitude"
- France – he is referred to as Barracuda
- Japan – Kong (コング), dubbed over by Japanese voice actor Shōzō Iizuka
- Hungary – Rosszfiú (translates as "Bad Boy")
- Taiwan – Guai Tou (怪頭) (translates as "Wacky Head" in Chinese)

=== Awards and decorations ===
==== "A Nice Place to Visit" ====
The following are the medals and service awards fictionally worn by Specialist 6 Baracus in "A Nice Place to Visit".

Personal decorations
Silver Star
Army Commendation Medal
Unit awards
Vietnam Presidential Unit Citation
Vietnam Gallantry Cross Unit Citation
Campaign and service medals
National Defense Service Medal
Armed Forces Expeditionary Medal
Vietnam Service Medal
Foreign awards
Vietnam Campaign Medal

Other accoutrements
Combat Infantryman Badge
Parachutist Badge
United States Army Special Forces Shoulder sleeve insignia

==== "Trial by Fire" and "Firing Line" ====
The following are the medals and service awards fictionally worn by Sergeant First Class Baracus in "Trial by Fire" and "Firing Line".

Personal decorations
Width-44 ribbon with two width-9 ultramarine blue stripes surrounded by two pairs of two width-4 green stripes; all these stripes are separated by width-2 white borders	Army Achievement Medal
Service Awards
	Army Good Conduct Medal
Campaign and service medals
	National Defense Service Medal
	Vietnam Service Medal
Foreign awards
	Vietnam Armed Forces Honor Medal
	Vietnam Civil Actions Medal
	Vietnam Campaign Medal

Other accoutrements
Parachutist Badge
1st Cavalry Division Shoulder sleeve insignia
United States Army Special Forces Shoulder sleeve insignia

== GMC van ==
The A-Team van as shown in the episode "Say It With Bullets".

B. A.'s iconic black and metallic gray GMC Vandura van used by the A-Team, with its characteristic red stripe, black and red turbine mag wheels, and rooftop spoiler, has become an enduring pop culture icon. Early examples of the van had a red GMC logo on the front grille, and an additional GMC logo on the rear left door. Early in the second season, these logos were blacked out, although GMC continued to supply vans and receive a credit on the closing credits of each episode.

It is a common error that the van is said to be all-black, whereas, in fact, the section above the red stripe is metallic gray (this error even followed through on to most toy models of the van). The angle of the rear spoiler can also be seen to vary on different examples of the van within the series. Additionally, some versions of the van have a sunroof, whereas others, typically those used for stunts do not. This led to continuity errors in some episodes, such as in the third season's "The Bells of St. Mary's", in a scene where Face jumps from a building onto the roof of the van. There is clearly no sunroof. Moments later, in an interior studio shot, Face climbs in through the sunroof. Also, in many stunts where the van would surely be totaled, other makes have been used, such as a black Ford Econoline with red hubcaps painted to simulate the original red turbine mags.

Many devices have been variously located in the back of the van in different episodes, including a mini printing press in "Pros and Cons", an audio surveillance recording device in "A Small and Deadly War", and Hannibal's disguise kits in various episodes.

When B. A. lends the van to Captain Murdock, Murdock concludes that B. A. has tuned the van's suspension to compensate for the added weight of his gold jewelry.

In the 2010 remake of The A-Team, the 1983 GMC Vandura van returned. Filming in Canada made it difficult to source the original vehicle and instead a modified 1994 Chevrolet G20 cargo van was used, but the red stripe is not the same as in the original van. B. A. tracks the van down in Mexico after leaving it for his career as an Army Ranger. Hannibal hijacks the vehicle and, when B. A. refuses to cooperate, shoots B. A. in the arm. This angers B. A., not because he was shot, but because the round went through him into the van. They rescue Face and pick up Murdock. When the team flees from General Tuco in a medical chopper, Murdock accidentally pilots it into an air-conditioning unit, tipping it off the roof and onto the van, destroying it. This infuriates B. A., prompting him to make death threats against Murdock.

== 2010 film ==
Quinton "Rampage" Jackson as Bosco "B. A." Baracus in the 2010 The A-Team film.

The 2010 film adaptation presents a Bosco "B. A." Baracus (born on June 20, 1978, in Phoenix) who is referred to simply as Bosco for much of the film's first act. In the film, he is a former Corporal when he meets Hannibal, and a Sergeant First Class by the time of the trial. While B. A. retains his trademark hairstyle, he does not wear gold chains around his neck like his TV counterpart did. Aside from the Army Ranger tattoo on his right arm, he sports tattoos on his knuckles: the left spells "PITY", while the right spells "FOOL". This is a reference to Mr. T's catchphrase, "I pity the fool."

His fear of flying is created at the film's start, after Bosco nearly falls out of a helicopter piloted by Murdock. He starts off much like his TV counterpart; he punches first, asks questions later, and still drives his distinctive GMC Vandura van. In contrast with the TV series, in the opening sequence, the van is accidentally destroyed by Murdock; and when B. A. is sprung from prison later in the film, he is a changed man. Concerned with the violence that has driven his life, Bosco swears a vow to never again end another life, and grows his hair out to help reflect this change. The more peaceful Bosco even allows himself to be beaten into submission by the psychotic killer Pike, until he is rescued by Hannibal. It is not until the film's third act, when informed by Hannibal that even Gandhi "wasn't afraid to fight for something he believed in", that Bosco re-shaves his head, and becomes an unstoppable powerhouse once more. He cites later that his conscience is now clear.

B. A. also explains that the reason he started his hairstyle as a child was that everyone in his neighborhood was afraid of him.

=== Awards and decorations ===
The following are the medals and service awards fictionally worn by Sergeant First Class Baracus in the 2010 movie adaptation.

Personal decorations
Width-44 crimson ribbon with a pair of width-2 white stripes on the edges	Legion of Merit
	Bronze Star Medal
	Purple Heart
Width-44 myrtle green ribbon with width-3 white stripes at the edges and five width-1 stripes down the center; the central white stripes are width-2 apart	Army Commendation Medal with two oak leaf clusters
Width-44 ribbon with two width-9 ultramarine blue stripes surrounded by two pairs of two width-4 green stripes; all these stripes are separated by width-2 white borders	Army Achievement Medal
Unit awards
Width-44 Old Glory red ribbon surrounded by gold frame. The ribbon has a central width-3 Old Glory red stripe flanked by pairs of stripes that are respectively width-3 white, width-3 ultramarine blue, width one-half white and width-2 ultramarine blue.	Valorous Unit Award
	Meritorious Unit Commendation
Service Awards
	Army Good Conduct Medal
Campaign and service medals
	National Defense Service Medal
	Armed Forces Expeditionary Medal
	Afghanistan Campaign Medal with two bronze service stars
	Iraq Campaign Medal with two bronze service stars
	Global War on Terrorism Expeditionary Medal
	Global War on Terrorism Service Medal
Service and training awards
	NCO Professional Development
	Army Service Ribbon
	Overseas Service Ribbon
Foreign awards
	NATO Medal

Other accoutrements
Combat Infantryman Badge
Master Parachutist Badge
Military Freefall Parachutist Badge
United States Army Special Forces Shoulder sleeve insignia
Special Forces tab
Ranger tab

== Other appearances ==
B. A. is a playable character in the crossover video game Lego Dimensions. His character pack includes his van. Mr. T is replaced by Dave Fennoy as B. A.'s voice actor. He can also be seen making a cameo appearance in an episode of the comedy sketch show Little Britain.

Baracus is parodied in the side-scrolling shooter game Broforce as a playable character known as B.A. Broracus. As a playable character, he fights with a flamethrower that can set enemies on fire and he can throw grenades.

Baracus is referenced in the theme song of the British children's television show Super Gran, sung by Billy Connolly and released as a single in 1985.

Baracus is referenced in the song JCB by the English folk duo Nizlopi in 2005.
