= Dwight Schultz =

American actor (born 1947)

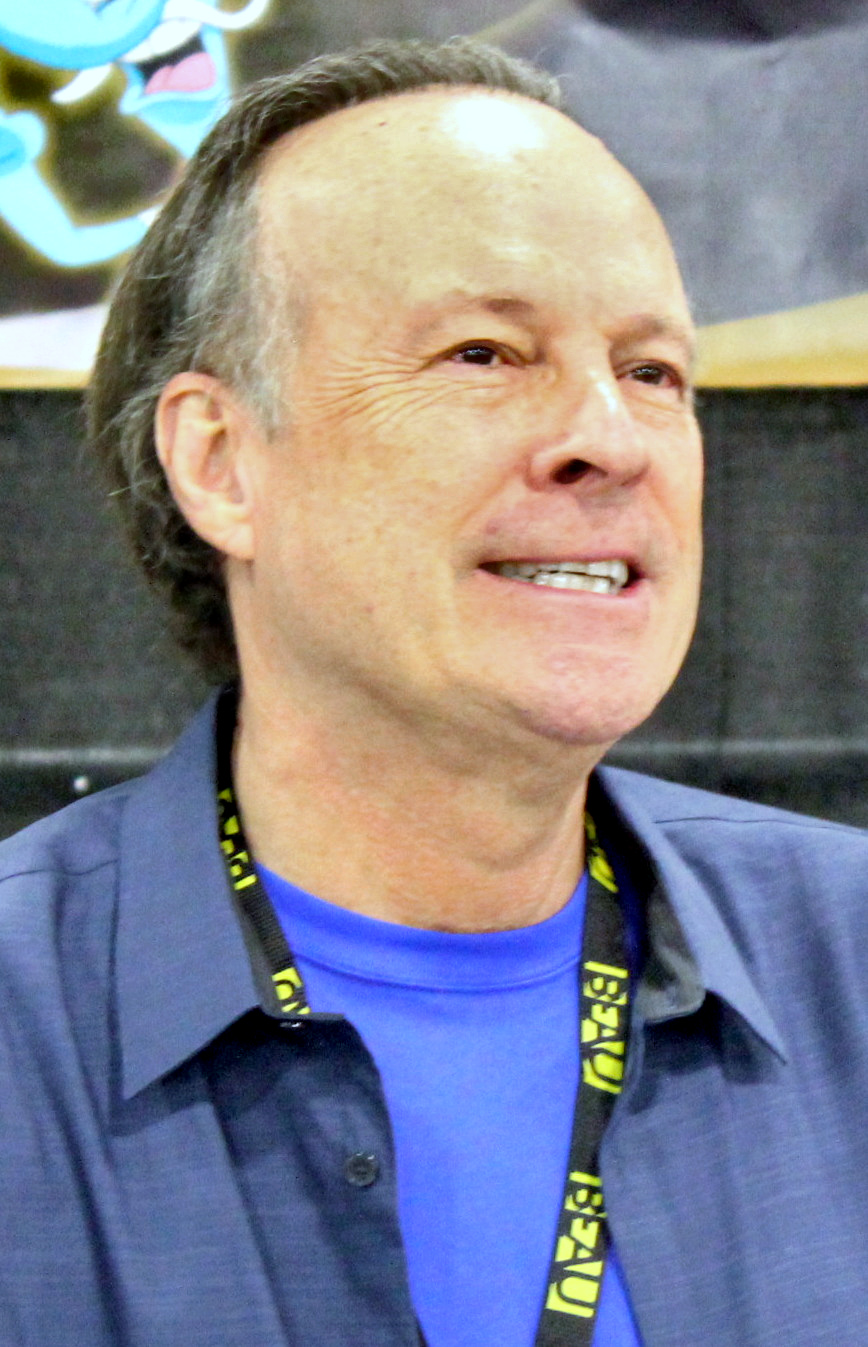
- Schultz in 2013
- Born: William Dwight Schultz; November 24, 1947 (age 78); Baltimore, Maryland, U.S.
- Education: Towson State College (BA)
- Occupation: Actor
- Years active: 1970–present
- Known for: Captain "Howling Mad" Murdock in The A-Team; Reginald Barclay in Star Trek: The Next Generation; Dr. Animo in Ben 10
- Spouse: Wendy Fulton (m. 1983)
- Children: 1

William Dwight Schultz (born November 24, 1947) is an American television, film and voice actor. He is known for his roles as Captain "Howling Mad" Murdock in the 1980s action series The A-Team and as Reginald Barclay in the Star Trek franchise.

In animation, he voiced the megalomaniacal mad scientist Dr. Animo in the Ben 10 franchise, Adrian Toomes/Vulture in some Marvel video games, Chef Mung Daal in Chowder, and Eddie the Squirrel in CatDog.

== Early life ==
Schultz was born in Baltimore, Maryland, on November 24, 1947. He is of German descent and a Roman Catholic. He attended Calvert Hall College High School and Towson State College where he graduated with a Bachelor of Arts in Theater Arts.

== Career ==
Schultz's breakthrough role was that of Captain "Howling Mad" Murdock on The A-Team. He appeared in several films, including The Fan (1981), and he starred in Fat Man and Little Boy (1989) as J. Robert Oppenheimer. In the early 1990s, he had a recurring role as Lieutenant Reginald Barclay in Star Trek: The Next Generation; he reprised the role in Star Trek: Voyager and the film Star Trek: First Contact. He played in the 1992 television film Child of Rage, starring opposite Mel Harris as a compassionate couple who adopt a troubled girl who has been sexually abused. In 2010, Schultz and former A-Team co-star Dirk Benedict made cameo appearances in the feature film The A-Team.

Schultz hosted a conservative talk-radio podcast called Howling Mad Radio which ended in March 2009. He has also guest-hosted on numerous occasions for Michael Savage on The Savage Nation, Jerry Doyle on The Jerry Doyle Show, and Rusty Humphries on The Rusty Humphries Show. He also posts political commentaries and podcasts on his official fansite.

== Personal life ==
Schultz married actress Wendy Fulton in 1983. They have a daughter.

Schultz is Catholic and a political conservative. In 2012, he began regular appearances on The Glazov Gang, an Internet political talk show hosted by Jamie Glazov, managing editor of FrontPage Magazine.

== Filmography ==
=== Film ===
==== Live-action ====
Year	Title	Role	Notes
1981	The Fan	TV Director	
1982	Alone in the Dark	Dan Potter	
1989	Fat Man and Little Boy	J. Robert Oppenheimer	
1990	The Long Walk Home	Norman Thompson	
1993	The Temp	Roger Jasser	
1996	Star Trek: First Contact	Lieutenant Reginald Barclay	
2010	The A-Team	German Doctor #1	Cameo

==== Animation ====
Year	Title	Role	Notes	Source
1998	Golgo 13: Queen Bee	Robert Hardy	English dub	
2000	Vampire Hunter D: Bloodlust	Benge, Old Man of Barbarois	English dub	
2003	The Chronicles of Riddick: Dark Fury	Skiff A.I.	Direct-to-video	
2003	The Animatrix	Nonaka	Direct-to-video	
2004	Van Helsing: The London Assignment	Dr. Henry Jekyll / Jack the Ripper	Direct-to-video	
2004	Kaena: The Prophecy	Ilpo		
2006	Asterix and the Vikings	Dubbledekabus		
2006	Ultimate Avengers 2	Odin	Direct to video	
2006	Tekkonkinkreet	Snake	English dub	
2007	Ben 10: Secret of the Omnitrix	Dr. Animo	Television film	
2010	Batman: Under the Red Hood	Freddie, Drug Dealer	Direct to video	
2012	Ben 10: Destroy All Aliens	Dr. Animo	Television film	
2016	Barbie: Star Light Adventure	Constantine	Limited theatrical release	
2017	Deep	Kraken		
2018	Lego DC Comics Super Heroes: The Flash	Eobard Thawne	Direct to video	
2019	Klaus	Additional voices		
2020	Happy Halloween, Scooby-Doo!	Scarecrow	Direct-to-Video	
2024	Watchmen Chapter 1	Detective Steve Fine, Happy Harry	Direct-to-video	

=== Television ===
==== Live-action ====
Year	Title	Role	Notes	Source
1981	Thin Ice	Mr. Ritchie		
1981	Hill Street Blues	Carmichael	Episode: "Life, Death, Eternity"	
1981	CHiPS	Lyle Pickett	Episode: "The Hawk and the Hunter"	
1981	Dial M for Murder	TV Director		
1981	Bitter Harvest	Schlatter		
1981	Standing Room Only	Bassick	Episode: "Sherlock Holmes"	
1981	Nurse	Dr. Kevin Michaels	Episode: "Going Home"	
1983	When Your Lover Leaves	Richard Reese	Television film	
1983–1987	The A-Team	Captain "Howling Mad" Murdock	97 episodes	
1987–1989	Perry Mason	Andrew Lloyd, Tony Franken	2 episodes	
1990	A Killer Among Us	Clifford Gillette	Television film	
1990–1994	Star Trek: The Next Generation	Lieutenant Reginald Barclay	5 episodes	
1992	Last Wish	Ed Edwards	Television film	
1992	Child of Rage	Rob Tyler	Television film	
1992	Woman with a Past	Mick	Television film	
1993	Victim of Love: The Shannon Mohr Story	Dave Davis	Television film	
1994	Babylon 5	Amis	Episode: "The Long Dark"	
1994	Menendez: A Killing in Beverly Hills	Dr. Jerome Oziel	Television film	
1994	Weird Science	Hank	Episode: "Circuit Courtship"	
1995–2001	Star Trek: Voyager	Lieutenant Reginald Barclay	6 episodes	
1995	The Outer Limits	Leviticus Mitchell	Episode: "If These Walls Could Talk"	
1995	Flipper	Wayne Cole	Episode: "The Green Freak"	
1995	Deadly Games	Nathan Abrams	Episode: "Motivational Speaker"	
1995	Diagnosis: Murder	Dr. Henry Wexler	Episode: "Naked Babes"	
1995	Enola Gay and the atomic bombing of Japan	Narrator	Television film	
1996	Nowhere Man	Harrison Barton	Episode: "Hidden Agenda"	
1996	Touched by an Angel	Dr. Adam Litowski	Episode: "A Joyful Noise"	
1996	Hart to Hart: Till Death Do Us Hart	Peter Donner	Television film	
1997	Diagnosis: Murder	Dr. Gavin Reed	Episode: "Delusions of Murder"	
1998	Stargate SG-1	The Keeper	Episode: "The Gamekeeper"	
1999	Walker, Texas Ranger	Lloyd Allen	Episode: "Safe House"	
2001	The Agency	Russell Orland	Episode: "Closure"	

==== Animation ====
Year	Title	Role	Notes	Source
1997	Lois & Clark: The New Adventures of Superman	Garret Grady	Episode: "AKA Superman"	
1997	Reign: The Conqueror	Attalos		
1998–2001	CatDog	Eddie the Squirrel, additional voices	Main role	
1999	Todd McFarlane's Spawn	Doctor, NSC Operative	Episode: "Seed of the Hellspawn"	
1999	The Chimp Channel	Stan		
1999	The Wild Thornberrys	Dr. Freed, Customer, Inspector Tabu	2 episodes	
1999–2000	Family Guy	Clerk, Randall Fargus	2 episodes	
2001–2002	Invader Zim	Mr. Slunchy, Earth Father, additional voices		
2001	Johnny Bravo	Leo	Episode: "A Johnny Bravo Christmas"	
2003	Ninja Scroll: The Series	Dakuan		
2003	The Cramp Twins	Bouncy Bob	Episode: "Walk Like a Man/Bouncy Bob"	
2003	Rugrats	Gracko	Episode: "Diapies and Dragons/Baby Power"	
2004–2006	The Grim Adventures of Billy & Mandy	Ernest, Turtle, Psychiatrist, various voices		
2006	Avatar: The Last Airbender	Trainer	Episode: "Appa's Lost Days"	
2006	Catscratch	Carmendor Nuget	Episode: "Blikmail/Love Jackal"	
2006–2007	Ben 10	Dr. Animo, various voices		
2007	Afro Samurai	Assassin 1, Patron 1, Ronin		
2007–2010	Chowder	Mung Daal, various voices		
2008	Ben 10: Alien Force	Dr. Animo	Episode: "Voided"	
2010–2012	Ben 10: Ultimate Alien	Dr. Animo		
2011	Scooby-Doo! Mystery Incorporated	Older Danny Darrow	Episode: "Escape from Mystery Manor"	
2012	The Avengers: Earth's Mightiest Heroes	Technovore	Episode: "Alone Against A.I.M."	
2013	Kung Fu Panda: Legends of Awesomeness	Fu-xi	Episode: "Serpent's Tooth"	
2013–2014	Avengers Assemble	Attuma		
2013–2014	Ben 10: Omniverse	Dr. Animo		
2014	Wander Over Yonder	Wild Card	Episode: "The Big Job/The Helper"	
2014–2017	All Hail King Julien	Karl, Karl-Gram, Patrick	10 episodes	
2015	Harvey Beaks	Spirit of Wetbark Lake, Snake	Episode: "Pe-Choo/The Spitting Tree"	
2015	Teen Titans Go!	TV	Episode: "Oil Drums"	
2015	Kirby Buckets	Shredlock	Episode: "Failure to Launch"	
2015	Ultimate Spider-Man	Mesmero, Attuma, Teacher		
2015	Teenage Mutant Ninja Turtles	Wyrm	Episode: "The Weird World of Wyrm"	
2016–2021	Ben 10	Dr. Animo	9 episodes	
2017	All Hail King Julien	Karl, Father Tentacle, Chimp, Fore-Vegetable, Rat, Thrax	7 episodes	
2018	The Powerpuff Girls	Lester van Luster	Episode: "Small World"	
2019	Young Justice	Mad Hatter	Episode: "Triptych"	
2024	Jellystone!	Dick Dastardly, Dinky Dalton	Episode: "LAFF Games"	
2025	WondLa	Vanpa	4 episodes	

=== Video games ===
Year	Title	Role	Notes	Source
1998	Fallout 2	Hakunin		
1999	CatDog: Quest for the Golden Hydrant	Eddie the Squirrel		
2000	Baldur's Gate II: Shadows of Amn	Mae'Var, Vithal, Prince Villynaty		
2000	Vampire Hunter D	Benge		
2000	Sacrifice	Additional voices		
2000	Call to Power II	Additional voices		
2001	Fallout Tactics: Brotherhood of Steel	Gammorin, Paladin Latham		
2001	Final Fantasy X	Maechen		
2001	Arcanum: Of Steamworks and Magick Obscura	Simeon Tor		
2001	Baldur's Gate: Dark Alliance	Additional voices		
2002	Spider-Man	Vulture		
2003	Crash Nitro Kart	Dingodile, Fake Crash		
2003	Final Fantasy X-2	Maechen, O'aka XXIII		
2003	Star Trek: Elite Force II	Lieutenant Reginald Barclay		
2003	Lionheart: Legacy of the Crusader	Additional voices		
2003	Lords of EverQuest	Lord Dungannon		
2003	Battlestar Galactica	Lord Erebus, Deimos		
2004	The Chronicles of Riddick: Escape from Butcher Bay	Hoxie		
2004	Crash Twinsanity	Papu Papu, Dingodile, Rusty Walrus, Tribesmen		
2004	The Bard's Tale	Additional voices		
2004	EverQuest II	Additional voices		
2004	Spider-Man 2	The Vulture	PSP and DS versions only	
2005	Fantastic Four	Additional voices		
2005	Destroy All Humans!	Air Force General, Fair Worker		
2005	Advent Rising	Kelehm Farwaters		
2005	X-Men Legends II: Rise of Apocalypse	Living Monolith, Garokk		
2005	Psychonauts	Crispin Whytehead		
2005	Gun	Hecht the Rancher		
2005	Killer7	Harman Smith		
2005	Neopets: The Darkest Faerie	King Hagan		
2005	Yakuza	Kage		
2006	X-Men: The Official Game	Magneto		
2006	Metal Gear Solid: Portable Ops	Python		
2006	Baten Kaitos Origins	Geldoblame		
2006	Final Fantasy XII	Gran Kiltias Anastasis, Old Dalan		
2006	Gothic 3	Additional voices		
2006	Superman Returns	Mr. Mxyzptlk, The Citizens of Metropolis		
2006	Tom Clancy's Splinter Cell Double Agent	Carson Moss		
2007	Fantastic Four: Rise of the Silver Surfer	Red Ghost		
2007	Mass Effect	Navigator Pressly, Dr. Zev Cohen, Bartender		
2007	Ben 10: Protector of Earth	Dr. Animo		
2007	Conan	Graven, Kalden		
2007	Armored Core 4	Emill, Enemy AI		
2007	The Darkness	Uncle Paulie Franchetti		
2007	Pirates of the Caribbean: At World's End	Montanari		
2008	Dark Sector	Robert Mezner, AD		
2008	Valkyria Chronicles	Prime Minister Maurits von Borg, Capt. Giorgios Geld		
2008	Spider-Man: Web of Shadows	Kraven the Hunter	PS2 and PSP versions only	
2008	God of War: Chains of Olympus	Charon, Helios, Male Greek, Fire Guard		
2008	The Rise of the Argonauts	Additional voices		
2008	Destroy All Humans! Path of the Furon	Sammy, Travis Skeever		
2009	Ben 10 Alien Force: Vilgax Attacks	Dr. Animo		
2009	Cartoon Network Universe: FusionFall	Thromnambular		
2009	Dragon Age: Origins	Bodahn Feddic, Additional voices		
2009	Terminator Salvation	Murphy		
2009	MadWorld	Noa, Martin		
2010	DC Universe Online	The Flash, Martian Manhunter		
2010	Final Fantasy XIII	Cocoon Inhabitants	English dub	
2010	Mafia II	Additional voices		
2010	Resonance of Fate	Gelsey		
2010	Mass Effect 2	Additional voices		
2011	Dragon Age II	Bodahn Feddic, additional voices		
2011	Skylanders: Spyro's Adventure	Additional voices		
2011	Gears of War 3	Richard Prescott		
2012	Skylanders: Giants	Ignitor		
2012	Ben 10: Omniverse	Dr. Animo		
2013	Skylanders: Swap Force	Ignitor		
2013	République	Headmaster		
2013	Infinity Blade III	Eves		
2013	The Elder Scrolls V: Skyrim – Dragonborn	Neloth		
2014	Ancient Space	H.E.C.T.O.R, Admiral Thorensen, Captain Yuri Rudenko		
2014	Middle-earth: Shadow of Mordor	Nemesis Orcs, Hallas		
2014	Skylanders: Trap Team	Ignitor		
2014	Wolfenstein: The New Order	Wilhelm "Deathshead" Strasse		
2015	Killing Floor 2	Reverend David Alberts		
2015	Batman: Arkham Knight	Lazlo Valentin / Professor Pyg		
2015	Skylanders: SuperChargers	Ignitor		
2015	Fallout 4	Knight Captain Cade		
2016	Master of Orion: Conquer the Stars	GNN Male Anchor		
2016	World of Warcraft: Legion	Additional voices		
2016	Lego Dimensions	H. M. "Howling Mad" Murdock, S. B. "Scowling Bad" Burdock, Mr. Wing		
2017	Crash Bandicoot N. Sane Trilogy	Papu Papu, Lab Assistants		
2017	Middle-earth: Shadow of War	Nemesis Orcs		
2018	Marvel's Spider-Man	Adrian Toomes / Vulture	also motion capture	
2019	Crash Team Racing Nitro-Fueled	Papu Papu, Nash, Geary		
2019	Marvel Ultimate Alliance 3: The Black Order	Odin		
2020	Iron Man VR	Willie Lumpkin / S.H.I.E.L.D. Agent E		
2024	Batman: Arkham Shadow	Arnold Wesker		

=== Broadway ===
- Night and Day
- The Crucifer of Blood
- The Water Engine

=== Radio ===
- Dark Matters Radio with Don Ecker and Special Co-Host Dwight Schultz
- Howling Mad Radio
- The Jerry Doyle Show
- The Laura Ingraham Show
- The Rusty Humphries Show
- The Savage Nation
