= Melinda Culea =

American actress (born 1955)

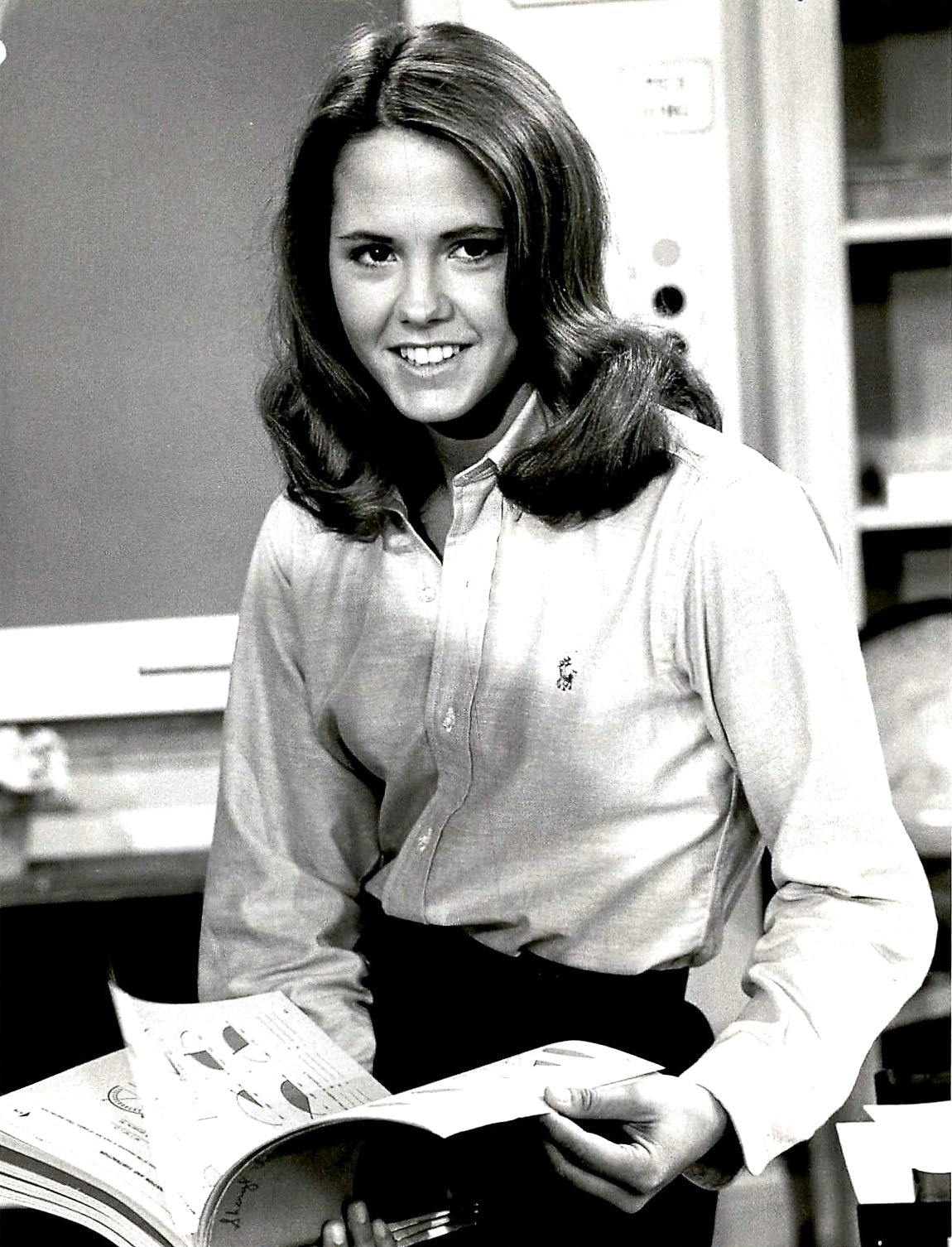
- Culea in Dear Teacher, her first television role, 1981
- Born: May 5, 1955 (age 71); Western Springs, Illinois, U.S.
- Occupations: Actress; model; author
- Years active: 1979–2001
- Known for: The A-Team; Brotherly Love; Knots Landing
- Spouse: Peter Markle (m. 1996)
- Children: 2

Melinda Culea (born May 5, 1955) is an American actress.

== Early life ==
Culea was born on May 5, 1955, in Western Springs, Illinois. She worked as a model before acting.

== Career ==
=== The A-Team ===
Culea is best known for playing Amy (Amanda) Allen in the 1980s hit TV series The A-Team. Her role was as a newspaper reporter who joined the team for the first season and half of the second season.

Introduced in the feature-length pilot episode "Mexican Slayride", her character was presented as feisty. However, Culea soon started to realize that her character had very little to do. Reportedly, star George Peppard did not like a female lead being part of the show, and made his feelings clear. Culea asked for her character to be involved in the team's fights, suggesting that Amy try to help, but she gets in the way – adding some comic relief. The producers resisted. Culea was ultimately dropped from the series in 1983, and her final appearance was in Season 2 Episode 12, "The White Ballot", although her character continued to be mentioned by the team during the show shortly thereafter. She could still be glimpsed briefly on one of the shots in the show's opening titles sequence. This scene was used for most of the show's run.

=== Other television roles ===
Culea acted in a number of other TV roles, mainly during the 1980s and 1990s.

Shortly after leaving The A-Team, Culea gained a leading role as Terry Randolph in the short-lived series Glitter. Another substantial role was playing the recurring character Paula Vertosick on Knots Landing for two seasons from 1988 to 1990. She also co-starred as Joey Lawrence's step-mother for two seasons on Brotherly Love from 1995 to 1997 on NBC and the WB.

She also made appearances on many other notable television series including Fantasy Island; Family Ties; St. Elsewhere; The X-Files; Star Trek: The Next Generation; Brotherly Love; Beverly Hills, 90210; and Murder, She Wrote.

=== Movie roles ===
Culea played the role of Constance Taylor in the movie Wagons East! (1994), directed by her future husband Peter Markle, and played Anna in Dying on the Edge (2001). She was an executive producer of Peter Markle's film Odds Are... (2018).

=== Other ===
As of 2016, she is working as an author and artist. Her first book Wondago is an illustrated mystery novel published in January 2016 by Griffith Moon Publishing.

== Selected filmography ==
Year	Title	Role	Notes
1981	Dear Teacher	Annie Cooper	TV – pilot
1982	Sometimes I Don't Love My Mother	Dallas Davis	TV Special
1982	The Rules of Marriage	Holly Stone	
1983	Fantasy Island	Shelley James	
1983	The A-Team	Amy Allen	24 episodes
1984	Hotel	Adrianna Dupre	
1984–1985	Glitter	Terry Randolph	12 episodes
1986	Dear Penelope and Peter	Judy Berlin	
1986–1987	Family Ties	Rebecca Ryan	3 episodes
1986–1987	St. Elsewhere	McPhail	5 episodes
1988–1990	Knots Landing	Paula Vertosick	28 episodes
1991	Beverly Hills, 90210	Dr. Natalie Donner	
1991	Jake and the Fatman	Ellen Webster	
1992	Star Trek: The Next Generation	Soren	
1990–1992	Murder, She Wrote	Nicole Gary	
1992	Likely Suspects	Capt. Wendy Hewitt	3 episodes
1992	Through the Eyes of a Killer	Alison Rivers	
1994	Wagons East	Constance Taylor	
1994	Moment of Truth: Murder or Memory?		
1995	Down, Out & Dangerous	CeCe Dryer	
1995–1997	Brotherly Love	Claire Roman	
1996	Buried Secrets	Laura Vellum	
1997	C-16: FBI		2 episodes
1998	Target Earth	Allison, Emmett's Gang	
1999	The X-Files	Karin Berquist	episode "Alpha"
2001	Family Law	Det. Cadden	
2001	Dying on the Edge	Anna	
