= Tim Dunigan =

American actor (born 1955)

- Born: Timothy P. Dunigan; August 2, 1955 (age 71); St. Louis, Missouri, United States
- Occupations: Actor, mortgage broker
- Years active: 1983–2002
- Height: 6 ft 5 in (1.96 m)

Timothy P. Dunigan (born August 2, 1955) is an American actor who is best known for having played the lead role of Captain Jonathan Power in Captain Power and the Soldiers of the Future. He also played con-man 1st Lt. Templeton "The Face-Man" Peck in the pilot for the 1980s hit The A-Team but was replaced by Dirk Benedict for the series. The reason given was that Dunigan was too young for the role, although series creators Frank Lupo and Stephen J. Cannell had wanted Benedict from the start but were overruled by the network executives.

== Early life ==
Dunigan was born in St. Louis, Missouri, to the late Robert S. Dunigan and his Romanian-American wife Olga Dunigan Argint.

== Acting career ==
As to why Dunigan wasn't chosen to participate in The A-Team beyond the pilot, according to the actor himself, "I look[ed] even younger on camera than I am. So it was difficult to accept me as a veteran of the Vietnam War, which ended when I was a sophomore in high school." He played the role of Davy Crockett as a young man in The Magical World of Disney's 1988–89 miniseries Davy Crockett. He had guest-starring television roles on several hit series: Cheers, Murder, She Wrote, Empty Nest, Beverly Hills, 90210, and JAG. During a phone interview for G4's Attack of the Show! program, it was revealed that Dunigan had quit acting and became a mortgage broker following his role in JAG in 2002.

== Family ==
Dunigan was the cousin of the late sports announcer Harry Caray. His uncle on his mother's side, Nicholas Argint, was a veteran of World War II, member of American Legion Post 111 in Missouri.

== Filmography ==
Year	Title	Role	Notes
1983	Mr. Smith	Tommy Atwood	Main cast (13 episodes)
1983	The A-Team	Templeton "Faceman" Peck	Episode: "Mexican Slayride"
1983	Wizards and Warriors	Geoffrey Blackpool	Recurring role (4 episodes)
1983	Missing Pieces	Al Seco	TV movie
1984	The Fall Guy	Junior Gallantine / Adrian Sloan	Episodes - "Cool Hand Colt" and "Sandcastles"
1986	Cheers	Doctor McNeese	Episode - "Dark Imaginings"
1987	Silver Spoons	Gary	Episode - "Hero Worship"
1987–1988	Captain Power and the Soldiers of the Future	Captain Jonathan Power	Main role (22 episodes)
1988–1989	The Magical World of Disney	Davy Crockett	Main role (4 episodes)
1989	Hard Time on Planet Earth	Michael	Episode - "Death Do Us Part"
1989	Murder, She Wrote	Charley Holcomb / Freddy Masters	Episode - "Three Strikes, You're Out"
1989	Captain Power: The Beginning	Captain Jonathan Power	TV movie
1990	Empty Nest	John Taylor	Episode - "A Flaw Is Born"
1990	Beverly Hills, 90210	Matt Brody	Episode - "The First Time"
1991	They Came from Outer Space	Ranger Binkley	Episode - "Sex, Lies and UFOs: Part 1"
1991	The Hit Man	Jerry	TV movie
1991	P.S. I Luv U	The Hitman	Episode - "No Thanks for the Memories"
1994	Hearts Afire	Dan Nichols	Episode - "The Sock-Her Boys"
1995	Diagnosis: Murder	Terry Broadhurst	Episode - "The Bela Lugosi Blues"
2002	JAG	Col. Norris	Episode - "Head to Toe"
