= Templeton Peck =

Fictional character

- The A-Team character
- Templeton "Faceman" Peck as he appears in the second season opening credits
- First appearance: "Children of Jamestown"
- Created by: Frank Lupo & Stephen J. Cannell
- Portrayed by: Tim Dunigan (pilot episode); Dirk Benedict (series); Bradley Cooper (film); TBC (TV series reboot)
- Voiced by: Sam Riegel (Lego Dimensions)

In-universe information
- Aliases: Alvin Brennar; Al Brennan; Al Peck; Holmes Morrison; Morrison Holmes
- Nicknames: (The) Faceman; Face (occasionally "The Face")
- Gender: Male
- Title: Lieutenant
- Family: A.J. Bancroft (father); Ellen Bancroft (half-sister)
- Born: Richard Bancroft; December 7, 1950
- Awards: Bronze Star Medal; Joint Service Commendation Medal; Army Commendation Medal (2); Purple Heart; National Defense Service Medal; Armed Forces Expeditionary Medal; Vietnam Service Medal; United Nations Korea Medal; Vietnam Campaign Medal; NCO Professional Development Ribbon; Republic of Vietnam Medal of Honor; Overseas Service Ribbon

Lieutenant Templeton Arthur Peck, played by Dirk Benedict, is a fictional character and one of the four protagonists of the 1980s action-adventure television series The A-Team. A recognized war hero, he is often referred to as (The) Faceman or simply Face. Although creators Stephen J. Cannell and Frank Lupo had Benedict in mind for the role, studio executives initially insisted that the role be handled differently. Tim Dunigan played the role in the pilot episode, but after it was completed, the same executives thought he looked too young to be a believable Vietnam veteran. At 6 ft 5 in (196 cm), Dunigan was also much taller than the rest of the cast, particularly the show's 5 ft 10 in (178 cm) muscleman Mr. T. He was replaced by Benedict for the rest of the show's run. Bradley Cooper portrayed the character in the 2010 film while Benedict appeared in a post-credits cameo.

== Character biography ==
Tim Dunigan as "Faceman" in the 1983 pilot episode "Mexican Slayride"

Originally serving as an infantry Soldier (thus earning a Combat Infantryman's Badge), "Face" commissioned as an Army Intelligence Officer assigned to support a Special Forces Operations Detachment Alpha (ODA) Team or "A-Team" where he met his soon to be fugitive counterparts. Suave, smooth-talking, and hugely successful with women, Peck serves as the team's con man and scrounger, able to get his hands on just about anything they need, using various disguises—albeit less than Colonel Hannibal—and assuming a wide variety of personas and backstories as his scams require. Effectively second-in-command behind Hannibal (although Army Aviator Captain Murdock outranks him), he is the one who arranges for supplies, equipment, and sensitive information using numerous scams and hustles; several episodes also suggest that he is also responsible for arranging the team's weaponry, especially when overseas, often via highly illegal means (see season three's "Skins" for one such reference). When Hannibal is elsewhere or captured during several episodes, Face is often seen to be at the helm of the team, planning their course of action (see season two's "Bad Time on the Border", season four's "Wheel of Fortune" and season five's "Point of No Return" for examples). He is also the team member who usually organizes the fees for their services, due to his aptitude with numbers, as demonstrated in a number of episodes, and at times is shown to have the ability to count large amounts of money or value expensive items within a matter of seconds.

In the pilot episode, it is revealed in a discussion with an elderly priest, who it is suggested was his mentor during his youth, that Face spent his youth at a Los Angeles orphanage run by the Catholic Church, although whether Face himself is actually Catholic is never revealed. Several later episodes also reference this orphanage, later named as "St. Mary's". The elderly priest is not seen again after the pilot. He does, however, mention that Face wandered into the orphanage when he was five years old and was "first orphaned by his family and then by his country." In "Mind Games", it is revealed that he was born with the name Alvin Brenner, and after a series of name changes, ended with Templeton Peck.

Face's relationship with the rest of the team is that of a surrogate family. His relationship with Hannibal is built on respect and, while Hannibal sometimes has to order him to do things (usually by saying "Move it Lieutenant" in a stern voice), Hannibal oftentimes treats Face like a son and calls him "kid", usually when he is apologizing for something. He tends to treat B.A. as a brother and, although B.A. never actually hurts him, Face is sometimes scared that B.A. is going to hit him, especially after he has found out that he and Hannibal drugged him to get him on an airplane. After Face ruins a scam in "Black Day at Bad Rock" during which B.A. is shot in the leg, Face spends a day fearing retaliation from B.A. (although none happens). Face tends to treat Murdock like a little brother and acts like a mentor to him and often takes Murdock with him on scams (which Murdock loves) and placating whatever delusion Murdock is currently having, although not nearly as badly as Hannibal does.

In the fifth-season episode "Family Reunion", it is revealed that Face is Richard Bancroft, the son of former presidential adviser and convicted criminal A. J. Bancroft. However, Face only learns this from Murdock after his father's death. Although Murdock found out earlier, Bancroft made him promise not to tell Face, who is furious that Murdock didn't tell him sooner about his father. Face is happy to find out about his half-sister Ellen Bancroft as it gives him at least one family member. Note that for the original broadcast, two endings were shot, with viewers able to phone in and vote on the outcome on whether Bancroft really was Face's father or not. The alternative ending has never been aired or released in any form.

Face seems to have an affinity for heavier caliber revolvers as opposed to the rest of the team's .45 or 9mm automatic pistols. Face usually carried a Colt Trooper .357 Magnum with a nickel finish and rosewood grips although he sometimes used a blued Smith & Wesson Model 29. Face was usually seen to use a Ruger Mini-14 or an Uzi when he needed more firepower.

Although in early episodes he is depicted very much as a suave but general hustler, often seen in leather jacket and jeans and merely trying to make a life for himself while on the run, by the second season his interests tend towards more cultural facets, such as country clubs, art purchasing, and wine tasting—albeit often obtained via, or used in, various cons—and his wardrobe reflecting this, containing more tailor-made suits and up-market designer items. He is sometimes also seen to be enjoying smoking expensive cigars, again a trait shared by Hannibal. This trait was written in to reflect Dirk Benedict's own love of cigars; the early first-season episode "A Small and Deadly War" shows a contradiction to this—while smoking a cigar as part of his guise on a scam mission with Amy, he throws it away and comments "How can Hannibal stand those things?". The very next episode broadcast and produced, "Black Day at Bad Rock", shows him to be contently puffing on a cigar for the first of a number of times in the series, suggesting that the character may have grown to like them.

Despite his preference for the finer things in life, Face often takes on the most dangerous roles in missions (something that he frequently complains about) as he often acts as the bait to lure out their target or takes huge risks with risky scams. This arguably makes him the most visible member of the team. In "The White Ballot" he publicly runs for Sheriff in order to invite an assassination attempt so that the A-Team can have the would-be assassins arrested for attempted murder. Similarly, in "Till Death Do Us Part" he marries an heiress that they rescue from a forced marriage so that her kidnappers will target him instead of her. Because Face sticks his neck out so much he is the most frequently captured member of the team while Murdock, who often accompanies Face on scams or acts as the bait when Face isn't able to, is captured the second most often. He is, however, pretty good at finding ways to escape but usually gets rescued by Hannibal and the rest of the team.

Aside from acting as bait, Face's role as scrounger and scam artist means that the risks he takes are usually higher than the other members of the team. In "Curtain Call" Face knocks out a guard, steals his uniform, and walks straight into a ranger station controlled by Col. Decker and his MPs to steal medical supplies that Murdock needs after being shot despite knowing there was a high probability of getting arrested. Also, when a member of the team needs to be captured in order to infiltrate an enemy prison it's usually Face who ends up with the job (although he'd rather not since it ruins his designer suit). In "The Island" Face lets himself be captured in order to find the prison where the doctor who once saved B.A.'s life in Vietnam is being held and in "The Theory of Revolution" he purposely gets caught in order to infiltrate a brutal dictator's prison. What's interesting is that he does this despite knowing that he will likely be beaten and interrogated as he doesn't seem to be surprised when he is hauled off for interrogation. Even Murdock tells him he was brave to have done it and gives him a merit badge (Murdock is a boy scout leader at this time). Despite his complaining, Face is actually a very brave guy who is willing to put the team before himself.

Face is generally portrayed as the least confrontational member of the main A-Team foursome. He often avoids physical fights, partly to protect his clothes. In contrast, Hannibal, Murdock and B.A. are more willing to engage in fights. A recurring storyline involves Face trying to find a romantic partner. In one episode, Murdock wins a car, a trip to Hawaii and a date with a woman on the game show "Howling Mad".

=== Awards and decorations ===
==== "A Nice Place to Visit" ====
The following are the medals and service awards fictionally worn by Lieutenant Peck in "A Nice Place to Visit".

Personal decorations
Bronze Star Medal
Joint Service Commendation Medal
Army Commendation Medal with one oak leaf cluster
Purple Heart
Unit awards
Presidential Unit Citation
Vietnam Presidential Unit Citation
Vietnam Gallantry Cross Unit Citation
Campaign and service medals
National Defense Service Medal
Armed Forces Expeditionary Medal
Vietnam Service Medal
Foreign awards
United Nations Korea Medal
Vietnam Campaign Medal

Other accoutrements
Combat Infantryman Badge
Parachutist Badge
United States Army Special Forces Shoulder sleeve insignia

==== "Trial by Fire" and "Firing Lane" ====
The following are the medals and service awards fictionally worn by Lieutenant Peck in "Trial by Fire" and "Firing Lane".

Personal decorations
Bronze Star Medal
Purple Heart
Campaign and service medals
National Defense Service Medal
Vietnam Service Medal
Service and training awards
NCO Professional Development
Overseas Service Ribbon
Foreign awards
Vietnam Armed Forces Honor Medal
Vietnam Campaign Medal

Other accoutrements
Parachutist Badge
1st Cavalry Division Shoulder sleeve insignia
United States Army Special Forces Shoulder sleeve insignia

== Nickname and origins ==
The character's full nickname varies in different media. Introduced in the Pilot and many other episodes, his nickname is clearly given as "The Faceman". Other examples drop "The". Many early episode scripts listed the character as "Face Man". In other literature, he is sometimes referred to as "The Face". In the 2010 movie, he is "Faceman", again dropping "the".

The name "Faceman" originates from a popular slang term used by girls for attractive male students during Stephen J. Cannell's high school years - i.e. "Look at that faceman" as in "Look at that good looking boy"; a hunk.

=== Character's name in other countries ===
- In some Spanish-speaking countries, his nickname is "Fas", coming from Fascinador ("fascinater") as it was stated in the pilot episode dubbed "Operation A.T." and "Black Day at Bad Rock" among many, many others.
- In Spain, his nickname was "Fénix" ("Phoenix").
- In Italy he was called "Sberla" ("Slap"), standing for "Faccia da Sberle" ("Slapface"), an Italian slang for "a lovable scoundrel".
- In Brazil, his nickname was "Cara-de-Pau" (literally "Wooden face", a Portuguese slang for "cheeky", "daring" or even "asshole").
- In Poland, "Buźka" ("Cute Face"), similarly to its Hungarian counterpart, Szépfiú.
- In France,"futé" which holds for "smart".
- In Russia, his name was "Красавчик", which stands for "handsome".
- In Korea, his name was "멋쟁이", which stands for "handsome and stylish".
- In Taiwan, his name was "小白", as in "小白臉", literally little white face, a phrase used to describe a good-looking, pampered, and sleek man.
- In Hungary, his name was "Szépfiú" ("Pretty boy").
- In Israel, his name was "פנים" (panim, "face").
- In Argentina, his name was "Faz".

== Vehicle ==
Peck drives a custom white 1984 Chevrolet Corvette (released 1983) with red interior and a red stripe (to match B.A.'s van). It is equipped with a CB radio and a mobile phone. The license plate was S967238 in "The Taxicab Wars" and then changed to 1HJG851. The car first featured in the second-season episode "The Taxicab Wars".

As well as a number of cameos in other stories, the car was prominently featured in several episodes, including season two's "Chopping Spree", where it was used as bait in an attempt to catch car thieves. The car's final appearance is in the fifth season opener "Dishpan Man", where it is heard, off-screen, to crash after new recruit Frankie Santana gives Face bad advice about repairing the faulty brakes.

== 2010 film ==
Bradley Cooper as Templeton "Faceman" Peck in the 2010 The A-Team film.

In the 2010 film, Peck is played by Bradley Cooper. Like B.A., Hannibal, and Murdock, he has an Army Ranger tattoo (on his right arm). As in the TV series, Face is depicted as a handsome, smooth-talking ladies' man, but is also shown having a relationship with Captain Charissa Sosa (Jessica Biel), who pursues the A-Team after they escape from prison.

Throughout the film, Face matures from a womanizing joker to a calculating professional - to the point that, in the film's climax, he, not Hannibal, plans the A-Team's legal redemption. Face plans the mission based on a classic confidence game including cranes and shipping crates, and involving Murdock being shot in the head. B. A. initially regrets the team's reliance on Face, but changes his mind after they learn Sosa has smuggled a key into Face's mouth with a kiss. Face also shows considerable maturity when he accepts his own punishment, rather than allowing Hannibal to take the full blame. Face ends the film by saying Hannibal's catchphrase, "I love it when a plan comes together."

Benedict had a small cameo, which he reportedly regretted. In the scene before Face's escape from the disciplinary barracks, he (Cooper) is approaching a tanning bed and asks Benedict's character what to do about his face. Benedict answers, "You don't mess with it, kid."

=== Awards and decorations ===
The following are the medals and service awards fictionally worn by Lieutenant Peck in the 2010 movie adaptation.

Personal decorations
Width-44 crimson ribbon with two width-8 white stripes at distance 4 from the edges.	Meritorious Service Medal
	Air Medal
Width-44 myrtle green ribbon with width-3 white stripes at the edges and five width-1 stripes down the center; the central white stripes are width-2 apart	Army Commendation Medal
Width-44 ribbon with two width-9 ultramarine blue stripes surrounded by two pairs of two width-4 green stripes; all these stripes are separated by width-2 white borders	Army Achievement Medal with two oak leaf clusters
Unit awards
Width-44 Old Glory red ribbon surrounded by gold frame. The ribbon has a central width-3 Old Glory red stripe flanked by pairs of stripes that are respectively width-3 white, width-3 ultramarine blue, width one-half white and width-2 ultramarine blue.	Valorous Unit Award
	Meritorious Unit Commendation
Service Awards
	Army Good Conduct Medal
Campaign and service medals
	National Defense Service Medal
	Armed Forces Expeditionary Medal
	Afghanistan Campaign Medal with two bronze service stars
	Iraq Campaign Medal with two bronze service stars
	Global War on Terrorism Expeditionary Medal
	Global War on Terrorism Service Medal
Service and training awards
	Army Service Ribbon
	Overseas Service Ribbon
Foreign awards
	NATO Medal

Other accoutrements
Combat Infantryman Badge
Master Parachutist Badge
Military Freefall Parachutist Badge
United States Army Special Forces Shoulder sleeve insignia
Special Forces tab
Ranger tab
