= The A-Team =

American action-adventure television series (1983–1987)

- Title card (seasons 1–4)
- Genre: Action
- Created by: Frank Lupo; Stephen J. Cannell
- Starring: George Peppard; Tim Dunigan (series pilot); Dirk Benedict; Dwight Schultz; Mr. T; Melinda Culea (seasons 1–2); Marla Heasley (seasons 2–3); Eddie Velez (season 5); Robert Vaughn (season 5)
- Narrated by: John Ashley
- Theme music composer: Mike Post; Pete Carpenter
- Composers: Mike Post; Pete Carpenter; Garry Schyman (uncredited)
- Country of origin: United States
- Original language: English
- No. of seasons: 5
- No. of episodes: 98 (list of episodes)

Production
- Executive producers: Frank Lupo; Stephen J. Cannell
- Producers: John Ashley (seasons 1–4); Patrick Hasburgh (season 1); Tom Blomquist (season 5)
- Camera setup: Film (1982–86); Film (principal photography)/videotape (post-production; 1986); Single-camera setup
- Running time: 48 minutes
- Production companies: Universal Television; Stephen J. Cannell Productions

Original release
- Network: NBC
- Release: January 23, 1983 – March 8, 1987

The A‑Team is an American action‑adventure television series that aired on NBC from January 23, 1983, to March 8, 1987. Created by Stephen J. Cannell and Frank Lupo, it follows a squad of former U.S. Army Special Forces commandos who, after being falsely convicted of a crime, escape military prison and become soldiers of fortune. Led by the cunning Colonel John "Hannibal" Smith and joined by Lieutenant Templeton "Faceman" Peck, Sergeant B. A. Baracus, and Captain H. M. Murdock, the team dedicates itself to helping those in need.

The series was a joint production of Universal Television and Stephen J. Cannell Productions for NBC. A feature film based on the series was released by 20th Century Fox in 2010.

== History ==
The A-Team was created by writers and producers Stephen J. Cannell and Frank Lupo at the behest of Brandon Tartikoff, NBC Entertainment's president. Cannell was fired from ABC in the early 1980s, after failing to produce a hit show for the network, and was hired by NBC; his first project was The A-Team. Tartikoff pitched the series to Cannell as a combination of The Dirty Dozen, Mission: Impossible, The Magnificent Seven, Mad Max and Hill Street Blues, with "Mr. T driving the car".

The A-Team was not considered commercially promising, although Cannell has said that George Peppard suggested it would be a huge hit "before we ever turned on a camera". The show became popular; the first regular episode, which aired after Super Bowl XVII on January 30, 1983, reached 26.4% of the television audience, placing fourth in the top 10 Nielsen-rated shows.

The show is prominent in popular culture for its cartoonish violence (with few injuries even with heavy weapons), formulaic episodes, the team's ingenuity in improvising weaponry and vehicles out of seemingly random parts, and its distinctive theme tune. The show boosted the career of Mr. T, who portrayed the show's initial central character B. A. Baracus. Some of the show's catchphrases, such as "I love it when a plan comes together", "Hannibal's on the jazz", and "I ain't gettin' on no plane!" have appeared on T-shirts and other merchandise.

In a Yahoo! survey of 1,000 US television viewers published in October 2003, The A-Team was voted the "oldie" television show viewers would most like to see revived, beating such popular television series from the 1980s as The Dukes of Hazzard and Knight Rider.

== Plot ==
In 1972, a crack commando unit was sent to prison by a military court for a crime they didn't commit. These men promptly escaped from a maximum security stockade to the Los Angeles underground. Today, still wanted by the government, they survive as soldiers of fortune. If you have a problem, if no one else can help, and if you can find them, maybe you can hire ... the A-Team.

— John Ashley's opening narration from Season 2

The A-Team has a plot structure of independent episodes with few references to past events, and few overarching stories except the characters' continuing motivation to clear their names. In explaining the ratings drop during the show's fourth season, reviewer Gold Burt complained that "the same basic plot had been used over and over again for the past four seasons with the same predictable outcome". Reporter Adrian Lee called the plots "stunningly simple" in a 2006 article for the UK newspaper The Express, citing such recurring elements "as BA's fear of flying, and outlandish finales when the team fashioned weapons from household items". The show became emblematic of "fit-for-TV warfare" due to its depiction of ferocious combat scenes with lethal weapons, where the participants are never killed and rarely seriously injured, with the notable exception of General Fulbright.

As the television ratings of The A-Team fell dramatically during the fourth season, the format was changed for the show's final season in 1986–87 to increase viewership. After years on the run from the authorities, the A-Team is finally apprehended by the military. General Hunt Stockwell, a mysterious CIA operative, propositions them to work for him. In exchange, he will arrange for their pardons upon successful completion of several suicide missions.

=== Connections to the Vietnam War ===
As a back story, the members of the A-Team were originally members of the 5th Special Forces Group during the Vietnam War. In the episode "Bad Time on the Border", Lieutenant Colonel John "Hannibal" Smith called them "ex-Green Berets". Their commanding officer Colonel Morrison ordered them to rob the Bank of Hanoi to help end the war. They succeeded, but on their return to base four days after the end of the war, they discovered that Morrison had been killed by the enemy and his headquarters burned down, destroying the proof that the A-Team were acting under orders. They were arrested, and imprisoned at Fort Bragg, from which they quickly escaped before trial.

An article in the UK news magazine the New Statesman published shortly after the premiere of The A-Team in the United Kingdom, characterized it as an idealization of the Vietnam War, and an example of the war slowly becoming accepted and assimilated into American culture.

== Episodes ==
The show ran for five seasons on the NBC television network, from January 23, 1983, to December 30, 1986 (with one additional, previously unbroadcast episode shown on March 8, 1987), for a total of 98 episodes.

== Characters ==
Main cast of The A-Team (left-to-right): Templeton "Faceman" Peck, John "Hannibal" Smith, H. M. "Howlin' Mad" Murdock, and Bosco "B. A." Baracus.

The A-Team revolves around the four members of a former commando unit, now mercenaries. Their leader is Lieutenant Colonel John "Hannibal" Smith (George Peppard), whose plans tend to be unorthodox but effective. Lieutenant Templeton Peck (Dirk Benedict in the TV series, Tim Dunigan appeared as Templeton Peck in the pilot), usually called "Face" or "Faceman", is a smooth-talking con man who is second-in-command, and the appropriator of vehicles and other useful items. The team's pilot is Captain H. M. "Howling Mad" Murdock (Dwight Schultz), who has been declared insane and lives in a Veterans' Affairs mental institution for the first four seasons. The team's strong man and mechanic is Sergeant First Class Bosco "B.A." Baracus (Mr. T).

In the first season and the first half of the second season, the team was assisted by reporter Amy Allen (Melinda Culea). In the second half of the second season, Allen was replaced by fellow reporter Tawnia Baker (Marla Heasley). The character of Tia Fulbright (Tia Carrere), a Vietnam War orphan now living in the United States, was meant to join the team in the fifth season, but she was replaced by Frankie Santana (Eddie Velez), who served as the team's special effects expert. Velez was added to the opening credits of the fifth season after its second episode.

=== Casting ===
Although the part of Face was written by Frank Lupo and Stephen J. Cannell with Dirk Benedict in mind, NBC insisted that the part should be played by another actor. Therefore, in the pilot, Face was portrayed by Tim Dunigan, who was later replaced by Benedict, with the comment that Dunigan was "too tall and too young". According to Dunigan: "I look even younger on camera than I am. So it was difficult to accept me as a veteran of the Vietnam War, which ended when I was a sophomore in high school."

Tia Carrere was intended to join the principal cast of the show in its fifth season after appearing in the season four finale, providing a tie to the team's inception during the war. Unfortunately for this plan, Carrere was under contract to General Hospital, which prevented her from joining The A-Team. Her character was abruptly dropped as a result.

According to Mr. T in Bring Back... The A-Team in 2006, the role of B. A. Baracus was written specifically for him. This is corroborated by Cannell's own account of the initial concept proposed by Tartikoff.

James Coburn, who co-starred (as Britt) in The Magnificent Seven, was considered for the role of Hannibal in The A-Team, and George Peppard (Hannibal) was the original consideration for the role of Vin (played by Steve McQueen instead) in The Magnificent Seven.

== Reception ==
=== Critical response ===
On review aggregator Rotten Tomatoes, season 1 scores 53% (19 reviews), and season 5 scores 60% (5 reviews).

=== Awards ===
The A-Team was nominated for three Emmy Awards: in 1983 (Outstanding Film Sound Mixing for a Series) for the pilot episode, in 1984 (Outstanding Film Sound Mixing for a Series) for the episode "When You Comin' Back, Range Rider?", and in 1987 (Outstanding Sound Editing for a Series) for the episode "Firing Line".

=== Ratings ===
During the show's first three seasons, The A-Team viewership included an average of 20% to 24% of all American television households. The first regular episode ("Children of Jamestown"), reached 26.4% of the television watching audience, placing fourth in the top 10 rated shows, according to the Nielsen ratings. By March, The A-Team, now on its regular Tuesday timeslot, dropped to the eighth spot, but rated a 20.5%. During the sweeps week in May of that year, The A-Team dropped again but remained steady at 18.5%, and rose to 18.8% during the second week of May sweeps. These were the highest ratings NBC had achieved in five years. During the second season, the ratings continued to soar, reaching fourth place in the twenty-highest rated programs, behind Dallas and Simon & Simon, in January (mid-season), while during the third season, it was beaten out only by two other NBC shows, including The Cosby Show.

In the fourth season, The A-Team experienced a dramatic fall in ratings, as it started to lose its position while television viewership increased. As such, the ratings, while stable, were relatively lower. The season premiere ranked a 17.4% (a 26% audience share on that timeslot) on the Nielsen Rating scale, but ratings quickly declined after that. In October, The A-Team had fallen to 19th and by Super Bowl Night had fallen further, to 29th on the night where the show had originally scored its first hit three years earlier. For the remainder of its fourth season The A-Team managed to hang around the 20th spot, far from the top 10 position it had enjoyed during its first three seasons.

After four years on Tuesday, NBC moved The A-Team to a new timeslot on Friday for what would be its final season. Ratings continued to drop, and The A-Team later fell out of the top 50. In November 1986, NBC canceled the series, declining to order the last nine episodes of what would have been a 22-episode season. The final season ranked 61st with a 12.8 average rating.

| Season | Time slot (ET) | Rank | Rating |
|---|---|---|---|
| 1982–83 | Sunday at 9:00 pm (Episode 1); Sunday at 10:00 pm (Episodes 2–3); Tuesday at 8:00 pm (Episodes 4–14) | 10 | 20.1 (Tied with Monday Night Football) |
| 1983–84 | Tuesday at 8:00 pm (Episodes 1–5, 7–23); Tuesday at 9:00 pm (Episode 6) | 4 | 24.0 |
| 1984–85 | Tuesday at 8:00 pm (Episodes 1–2, 4–25); Tuesday at 9:00 pm (Episode 3) | 6 | 21.9 |
| 1985–86 | Tuesday at 8:00 pm (Episodes 1, 3–23); Tuesday at 9:00 pm (Episode 2) | 30 | 16.9 |
| 1986–87 | Friday at 8:00 pm (Episodes 1–8, 10–11); Tuesday at 9:00 pm (Episode 9); Tuesday at 8:00 pm (Episode 12); Sunday at 8:00 pm (Episode 13) | 61 | 12.8 |

=== International ===
The A-Team has been broadcast worldwide and international response has been varied. In 1984, main cast members George Peppard, Mr. T, Dirk Benedict, and Dwight Schultz were invited to the Netherlands. Peppard was the first to receive the invitation and thus thought the invitation applied only to him. When the other cast members were also invited, Peppard declined. The immense turn-out for the stars was unforeseen, and they were forced to leave early as a security measure. A video was released in which Schultz apologised and thanked everyone who had attended.

Although ratings soared during its early seasons, many US television critics described the show largely as cartoonish and thereby wrote the series off. Most reviews focused on acting and the formulaic nature of the episodes, most prominently the absence of actual killing in a show about Vietnam War veterans.

The show was a huge hit in Italy in the mid-1980s to the 1990s and was also popular in France where it was broadcast as L'Agence tous risques (literally The all-risk Agency). In Indonesia, The A-Team also gained success as a big hit since the television network RCTI aired the show in December 1989 until 1994.

They are all Vietnam veterans. The gradual assimilation of Vietnam into acceptable popular mythology, which began solemnly with The Deer Hunter, has reached its culmination with The A-Team: No longer a memory to be hurriedly brushed aside, but heroes of a network adventure show. Their enemy is a comic army officer, Col. Lynch, see Sgt. Bilko, see Beetle Bailey, see M*A*S*H, whose pursuit of our heroes is doomed to slapstick failure. This is classic right-wing American populism; patriotic, macho, anti-authority, and is unlikely to be understood in Britain, where to be right-wing implies an obsequiousness towards officers and the status quo. But right-wing this series certainly is. The bandits, it turns out, are in league with a group of sinister guerrillas who are trying to destabilise the country. Thanks to the A-Team's hearts and minds policy, the villagers rise up and put them to rout, in a 20-minute series of comic-book battle scenes, over-turning cars and airplane stunt-tricks, in which not a single person is hurt.

— Mary Harron, New Statesman

== On-screen violence ==
The violence presented in The A-Team is highly sanitized. People do not have visible wounds and blood though they might have a limp and sling, nor does the A-Team kill people. The results of violence are only ever presented when required for the script. After almost every car crash, there is a brief shot showing the occupants of the vehicle climbing out of the mangled or burning wreck, even in helicopter crashes. However, more of these types of takes were dropped near the end of the fourth season. According to co-creator Stephen J. Cannell, this part of the show became a running joke for the writing staff and they would at times test the limits of believability on purpose.

The show has been described as cartoonish and likened to Tom and Jerry. Dean P. of the Courier-Mail described the violence in the show as "hypocritical" and that "the morality of giving the impression that a hail of bullets does no-one any harm is ignored. After all, Tom and Jerry survived all sorts of mayhem for years with no ill-effects." Television reviewer Ric Meyers joked that the A-Team used "antineutron bullets—they destroy property for miles around, but never harm a human being". According to certain estimates, an episode of The A-Team held up to 46 violent acts. Cannell responded: "They were determined to make a point, and we were too big a target to resist. Cartoon violence is a scapegoat issue." Originally, The A-Team's status as a hit show remained strong, but it ultimately lost out to more family-oriented shows such as The Cosby Show, Who's the Boss? and Growing Pains. John J. O'Connor of The New York Times wrote in a 1986 article that "...a substantial number of viewers, if the ratings in recent months are to be believed, are clearly fed up with mindless violence of the car-chasing, fist-slugging variety".

== GMC Vandura ==
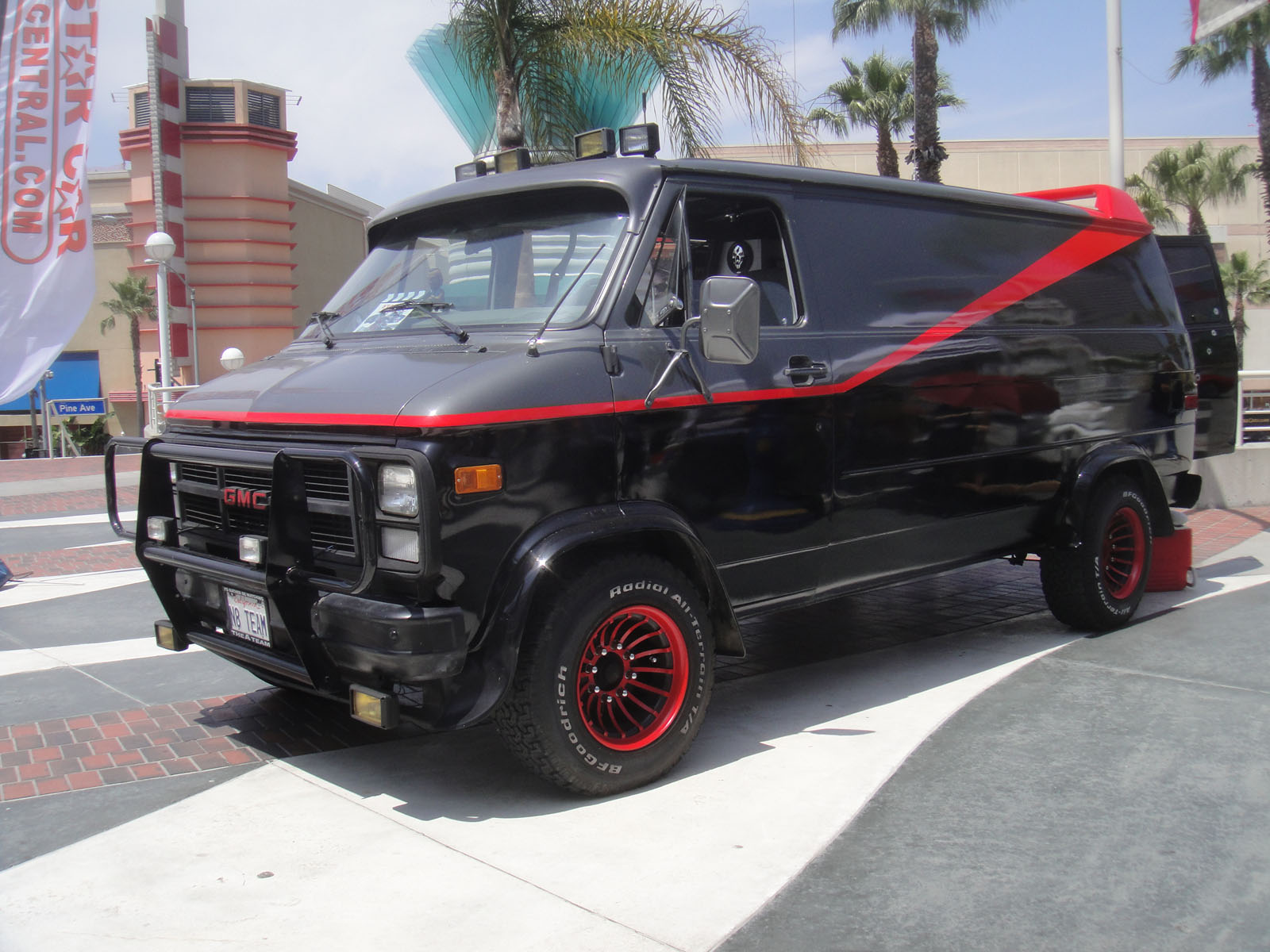
The A-Team drove a 1983 GMC Vandura van.

The 1983 GMC Vandura van used in The A-Team television series is recognizable for its red stripe, black-and-red turbine-style wheels, and rooftop spoiler. A customized 1994 GMC Vandura used in the 2010 film adaptation was displayed at the 2010 New York International Auto Show.

== Merchandise ==
The huge success of the series yielded a vast array of merchandise, including toys, video games, and snacks released worldwide. This includes several sets of trading cards and stickers, action figures from Galoob, B.A.'s van, Face's Corvette, helicopters, trucks, and jeeps from model car manufacturer Ertl. It includes jigsaw puzzles, View-Master reels, an electric race car track, and a TYCO produced train set. Following the original cancellation of the series, further merchandise has appeared as the series has achieved cult status, including an A-Team van by Hot Wheels. In 2016, Lego released a pack that includes a B.A. Baracus minifigure and constructible van, which unlocks additional A-Team themed content in the video game Lego Dimensions, including all four team members as playable characters.

=== Comics ===
Marvel Comics produced a three-issue A-Team comic book series, which was later reprinted as a trade paperback. Similarly, in the United Kingdom, an A-Team comic strip appeared for several years in the 1980s as part of the children's television magazine and comic Look-In, to tie in with the British run of the series. It was preceded by a short run in the final year (1984) of TV Comic.

=== Books ===
Several novels are based on the series, the first six published in America by Dell and in Britain by Target Books, and the last four only published in Britain. The first six are credited to Charles Heath. The books are generally found in paperback form, although hardback copies (with different cover artwork) were also released.

- The A-Team (adapted from the pilot written by Frank Lupo and Stephen J. Cannell)
- Small But Deadly Wars (adapted from the episodes "A Small and Deadly War" written by Lupo and "Black Day at Bad Rock" written by Patrick Hasburgh)
- When You Comin' Back, Range Rider? (adapted from the episode of the same name written by Lupo)
- Old Scores to Settle (adapted from the episodes "The Only Church in Town" written by Babs Greyhosky and "Recipe for Heavy Bread" written by Cannell, although the novel features the latter episode first)
- Ten Percent of Trouble (adapted from the episodes "Steel" written by Lupo and "The Maltese Cow" written by Thomas Szollosi and Richard Christian Matheson)
- Operation Desert Sun: The Untold Story, credited on the cover to Charles Heath but on the title page to Louis Chunovic. (This is an original story that tells of the events of the mission that got the team sent to prison for a crime they did not commit.)
- Bullets, Bikinis and Bells by Ron Renauld (adapted from the episodes "Bullets and Bikinis" written by Mark Jones and "The Bells of St. Mary's" written by Cannell)
- Backwoods Menace by Ron Renauld (adapted from the episodes "Timber!" written by Jeff Ray, and "Children of Jamestown" written by Cannell)
- The Bend in the River by David George Deutsch (adapted from the episode of the same name written by Cannell and Lupo)
- Death Vows by Max Hart (adapted from the episode "Till Death Us Do Part" written by Greyhosky) – This is the only book in the series to be based on one standard-length episode.
- Two plot-your-own-adventure books, with a section of text and several options of what to do next, were released as part of the same range, again only available in Britain.

In the United Kingdom from 1985 to 1988, four Annuals were produced, each consisting of text and comic strip stories, puzzles, and photos of the show's stars, with a further one produced by Marvel Comics consisting of several reprinted comic strips, released in 1989 and 1990.

A Panini set of stickers, which adapt six TV episodes (from the first and earlier second season) using shots from the episodes, can be stuck into an accompanying book, with text under each inserted sticker to narrate the story.

=== Theme song and soundtrack ===
The original main theme composed by Mike Post and Pete Carpenter (in a performance credited to Post) was released on the vinyl LP Mike Post – Television Theme Songs (Elektra Records E1-60028Y, 1982) and again on the Mike Post – Mike Post LP (RCA Records AFL1-5183, 1984), both long out-of-print; however, this was not the same version of the theme as on-screen. The theme from seasons two through four (including the opening narration and sound effects), was also released on TVT's Television's Greatest Hits: 70s and 80s. A 7-inch single of the song credited to Post was released on RCA in 1984.

The French version of the song has lyrics, which mirror the spoken description of the show in the English opening credits. The theme has been ranked among the best TV themes ever, with TV weatherman Al Roker sharing that opinion, and using the song to "get jazzed up" in the morning.

Though no original music other than the theme has been released, in 1984 EMI issued an album of re-recorded material from the series conducted by Daniel Caine, reissued by Silva Screen on compact disc in 1999, SILVAD 3509.

- Theme from The A-Team (3:13)
- Young Hannibal (2:57)
- B. A.'s Ride (2:34)
- The A-Team in New York City (2:43)
- Bandits (2:08)
- Taxi Chase (2:13)
- The A-Team Escape (1:16)
- The A-Team Prepare for War (2:08)
- Showtime (3:22)
- Move, Sucker (1:04)
- Let's Get Busted (1:06)
- Murdock's "Face" (3:01)
- Helicopters (2:36)
- More Bandits (1:22)
- Theme from The A-Team (3:27)

=== Video games ===
Video games were released for numerous platforms, mostly as shooter games.

In 1983–84, Saboteur, first designed by Howard Scott Warshaw, was in development for the Atari 2600 as an action game and was meant to be a sequel to Yars' Revenge. Atari's then parent Warner-Brothers wanted to convert the game into The A-Team to fulfill a licensing obligation, and Saboteur and its contributions to the Yars universe were dropped. This new project retained much of the design and gameplay from its original incarnation during its testing phase with the player primarily controlling a disembodied head representing Mr. T, along with Murdoch, after replacing Hannibal during development, to stop an evil enemy faction from destroying the world with a nuclear weapon. Due to possible licensing issues, The A-Team wasn't released commercially, instead the prototype would be shelved indefinitely, though it can be played online and downloaded. Eventually, the original finished version of Saboteur itself, under its original design, plot, and gameplay, would finally see an official release in November 2004 for the first Atari Flashback console.

In 1985, The A-Team was published and released on the Commodore 64 by Courbois Software. It is an action game, in the form of a top-down shooter, in which players assume the role of an unnamed soldier charged with doing battle against the A-Team in the form large floating heads. Players are positioned on the bottom portion of the screen and move left and right, shooting upwards at the A-team as they move left to right, each with their own attack pattern based on the personalities of each character. The player eliminates each member by shooting them enough times, defeating each one to end a round with the process repeated with each round being harder than the last. Players have three lives and are killed on one hit. The game is endless meaning there is no way to complete it. The only achievement during prolonged play is getting the highest score. A strange notable trait this game has the digitized version of the main theme for Star Wars that plays on the title screen instead of The A-Team's theme.

In 1989, El Equipo A (Spanish for The A-Team) was developed and published by Zafiro Software Division as a side scrolling shooter for the Amstrad CPC, ZX Spectrum, MS-DOS, and MSX. Gameplay consists of levels scrolling to the left or right depending on the level as players shoot various enemies such as soldiers, tanks, and jeeps while avoiding shooting innocent civilians and the A-Team as they appear on screen. The game is only in Spanish and from most of the gameplay, low quality, and different graphics, the game is a bootleg version of Operation Wolf each based the original's respective platforms that manages to reuse many of their same overall mechanics as a whole.

On June 15, 2010, The A-Team was released by GameHouse and RealNetworks under Fox Digital Entertainment and is based on the 2010 film for the iPhone as an overhead scrolling, third person, action shooter with cover based mechanics for the purpose of marketing the film. Players control the A-team as they battle enemies with melee hand-to-hand or ranged weapon combat and can switch between each member during levels. Some levels allowed players to control an attack helicopter the shoot enemies and destroy objects. Voice-overs from B.A. Baracus are portrayed by Quinton Jackson from the film.

== Production ==
=== Filming ===
The series was co-produced by former actor John Ashley who narrated the movie.

== Home media ==
Universal Studios has released all five seasons of The A-Team on DVD in Region 1, 2, and 4. In Region 2, a complete series set titled The A-Team—The Ultimate Collection was released on October 8, 2007. A complete series set was released in Region 1 on June 8, 2010, including 25 discs packaged in a replica of the black van. The complete series set was released in Region 4 on November 3, 2010. All 5 seasons were re-released in Region 2 with new packaging on June 21, 2010. The series was remastered and released on Blu-ray disc in the United Kingdom by Fabulous Films on October 17, 2016.

== Legacy ==
=== Bring Back... The A-Team (2006) ===
On May 18, 2006, Channel 4 in the UK attempted to reunite the surviving cast members of The A-Team for the show Bring Back... in an episode titled "Bring Back...The A-Team".

Justin Lee Collins presented the challenge, securing interviews and appearances from Dirk Benedict, Dwight Schultz, Marla Heasley, Jack Ging, series co-creator Stephen Cannell, and Mr. T. Collins eventually united Benedict, Schultz, Heasley, Ging and Cannell, along with William Lucking, Lance LeGault, and George Peppard's son, Christian. Mr. T was unable to make the meeting, which took place in the Friar's Club in Beverly Hills, but he appeared on the show for a brief talk with Collins.

=== Feature film ===
A feature film based on The A-Team was released on June 11, 2010, and was produced by 20th Century Fox. The film stars Liam Neeson as Hannibal, Bradley Cooper as Face, Quinton Jackson as B.A. and Sharlto Copley as Murdock with Jessica Biel as the team's ally and Patrick Wilson as the film's villain, Agent Lynch, while both Dirk Benedict (Face) and Dwight Schultz (Murdock) made brief cameo appearances in the film (as a prisoner using a sunbed and a psychiatrist overseeing Murdock's shock therapy, respectively); because of timing issues, these scenes were moved to the end of the credits. They were later reinserted for the extended-cut of the film.

=== Reboot series ===
In September 2015, Fox announced the development of a reboot A-Team series with Chris Morgan as executive producer with Cannell's daughter, Tawnia McKiernan, and Albert Kim writing. The team had male and female characters but the project did not make it to the screen.

== See also ==
- 1983 in American television
- United States Army Special Forces in popular culture
- Mercenaries in popular culture
