= List of The A-Team episodes =

The A-Team began airing on NBC on January 23, 1983, with the pilot episode, "Mexican Slayride", and ended on March 8, 1987, with "Without Reservations". The show comprises 98 episodes over five seasons.

== Overview ==
Season	Episodes	Originally released	
Season	Episodes	First released	Last released
1	14	January 23, 1983	May 10, 1983
2	23	September 20, 1983	May 15, 1984
3	25	September 18, 1984	May 14, 1985
4	23	September 24, 1985	May 13, 1986
5	13	September 26, 1986	March 8, 1987

== Episodes ==
=== Season 1 (1983) ===
No. overall	No. in season	Title	Directed by	Written by	Original release date
1	1	"Mexican Slayride"	Rod Holcomb	Frank Lupo & Stephen J. Cannell	January 23, 1983
2	2	"Mexican Slayride"	Rod Holcomb	Frank Lupo & Stephen J. Cannell	January 23, 1983
3	3	"Children of Jamestown"	Christian I. Nyby II	Stephen J. Cannell	January 30, 1983
4	4	"Pros and Cons"	Ron Satlof	Stephen J. Cannell	February 8, 1983
5	5	"A Small and Deadly War"	Ron Satlof	Frank Lupo	February 15, 1983
6	6	"Black Day at Bad Rock"	Christian I. Nyby II	Patrick Hasburgh	February 22, 1983
7	7	"The Rabbit Who Ate Las Vegas"	Bruce Kessler	Frank Lupo	March 1, 1983
8	8	"The Out-of-Towners"	Chuck Bowman	Frank Lupo	March 15, 1983
9	9	"Holiday in the Hills"	Arnold Laven	Babs Greyhosky	March 22, 1983
10	10	"West Coast Turnaround"	Guy Magar	Story by : Babs Greyhosky; Teleplay by : Stephen J. Cannell and Patrick Hasburgh	April 5, 1983
11	11	"One More Time"	Arnold Laven	Story by : Babs Greyhosky; Teleplay by : Frank Lupo and Patrick Hasburgh	April 12, 1983
12	12	"Till Death Do Us Part"	Guy Magar	Babs Greyhosky	April 19, 1983
13	13	"The Beast from the Belly of a Boeing"	Ron Satlof	Patrick Hasburgh	May 3, 1983
14	14	"A Nice Place to Visit"	Bernard McEveety	Frank Lupo	May 10, 1983

=== Season 2 (1983–84) ===
No. overall	No. in season	Title	Directed by	Written by	Original release date
15	1	"Diamonds 'n Dust"	Ron Satlof	Patrick Hasburgh	September 20, 1983
16	2	"Recipe for Heavy Bread"	Bernard McEveety	Stephen J. Cannell	September 27, 1983
17	3	"The Only Church in Town"	Christian I. Nyby II	Babs Greyhosky	October 11, 1983
18	4	"Bad Time on the Border"	Bruce Kessler	Richard Christian Matheson & Thomas Szollosi	October 18, 1983
19	5	"When You Comin' Back, Range Rider?"	Christian I. Nyby II	Frank Lupo	October 25, 1983
20	6	"When You Comin' Back, Range Rider?"	Christian I. Nyby II	Frank Lupo	October 25, 1983
21	7	"The Taxicab Wars"	Gilbert M. Shilton	Stephen J. Cannell	November 1, 1983
22	8	"Labor Pains"	Arnold Laven	Richard Christian Matheson & Thomas Szollosi	November 8, 1983
23	9	"There's Always a Catch"	Ron Satlof	Richard Christian Matheson & Thomas Szollosi	November 15, 1983
24	10	"Water, Water Everywhere"	Sidney Hayers	Story by : Sidney Ellis; Teleplay by : Jo Swerling, Jr. and Sidney Ellis	November 22, 1983
25	11	"Steel"	Gilbert M. Shilton	Frank Lupo	November 29, 1983
26	12	"The White Ballot"	Dennis Donnelly	Jeff Ray	December 6, 1983
27	13	"The Maltese Cow"	Dennis Donnelly	Richard Christian Matheson & Thomas Szollosi	December 13, 1983
28	14	"In Plane Sight"	Tony Mordente	Babs Greyhosky	January 3, 1984
29	15	"The Battle of Bel Air"	Gilbert M. Shilton	Frank Lupo	January 10, 1984
30	16	"Say It With Bullets"	Dennis Donnelly	Richard Christian Matheson & Thomas Szollosi	January 17, 1984
31	17	"Pure-Dee Poison"	Dennis Donnelly	Allan Cole & Chris Bunch	January 31, 1984
32	18	"It's a Desert Out There"	Arnold Laven	Bruce Cervi	February 7, 1984
33	19	"Chopping Spree"	Michael O'Herlihy	Stephen Katz	February 14, 1984
34	20	"Harder Than It Looks"	Ivan Dixon	Babs Greyhosky	February 21, 1984
35	21	"Deadly Maneuvers"	Mike Vejar	Richard Christian Matheson & Thomas Szollosi	February 28, 1984
36	22	"Semi-Friendly Persuasion"	Craig R. Baxley	Danny Lee Cole	May 8, 1984
37	23	"Curtain Call"	Dennis Donnelly	Stephen Katz	May 15, 1984

=== Season 3 (1984–85) ===
No. overall	No. in season	Title	Directed by	Written by	Original release date
38	1	"Bullets and Bikinis"	Dennis Donnelly	Mark Jones	September 18, 1984
39	2	"The Bend in the River"	Michael O'Herlihy	Stephen J. Cannell & Frank Lupo	September 25, 1984
40	3	"The Bend in the River"	Michael O'Herlihy	Stephen J. Cannell & Frank Lupo	September 25, 1984
41	4	"Fire"	Tony Mordente	Stephen Katz	October 2, 1984
42	5	"Timber!"	David Hemmings	Jeff Ray	October 16, 1984
43	6	"Double Heat"	Craig R. Baxley	Stephen Katz	October 23, 1984
44	7	"Trouble on Wheels"	Michael O'Herlihy	Mark Jones	October 30, 1984
45	8	"The Island"	Michael O'Herlihy	Mark Jones	November 13, 1984
46	9	"Showdown!"	James Fargo	Milt Rosen	November 20, 1984
47	10	"Sheriffs of Rivertown"	Dennis Donnelly	Mark Jones	November 27, 1984
48	11	"The Bells of St. Mary's"	Dennis Donnelly	Stephen J. Cannell	December 4, 1984
49	12	"Hot Styles"	Tony Mordente	Stephen Katz	December 11, 1984
50	13	"Breakout!"	Dennis Donnelly	Stephen Katz & Mark Jones	December 18, 1984
51	14	"Cup A' Joe"	Craig R. Baxley	Dennis O'Keefe III	January 8, 1985
52	15	"The Big Squeeze"	Arnold Laven	Stephen J. Cannell	January 15, 1985
53	16	"Champ!"	Michael O'Herlihy	Stephen Katz	January 22, 1985
54	17	"Skins"	Dennis Donnelly	Mark Jones	January 29, 1985
55	18	"Road Games"	Dennis Donnelly	Mark Jones	February 5, 1985
56	19	"Moving Targets"	Dennis Donnelly	Mark Jones	February 12, 1985
57	20	"Knights of the Road"	Michael O'Herlihy	Burt Pearl & Steven L. Sears	February 26, 1985
58	21	"Waste 'Em!"	Sidney Hayers	Stephen Katz & Mark Jones	March 5, 1985
59	22	"Bounty"	Michael O'Herlihy	Mark Jones & Stephen Katz	April 2, 1985
60	23	"Beverly Hills Assault"	Craig R. Baxley	Paul Birnbaum	April 9, 1985
61	24	"Trouble Brewing"	Michael O'Herlihy	Burt Pearl & Steven L. Sears	May 7, 1985
62	25	"Incident at Crystal Lake"	Tony Mordente	Stephen J. Cannell & Frank Lupo	May 14, 1985

=== Season 4 (1985–86) ===
No. overall	No. in season	Title	Directed by	Written by	Original release date
63	1	"Judgment Day"	David Hemmings	Frank Lupo	September 24, 1985
64	2	"Judgment Day"	David Hemmings	Frank Lupo	September 24, 1985
65	3	"Where Is the Monster When You Need Him?"	Michael O'Herlihy	Stephen J. Cannell	October 1, 1985
66	4	"Lease with an Option to Die"	David Hemmings	Bill Nuss	October 22, 1985
67	5	"The Road to Hope"	David Hemmings	Stephen J. Cannell	October 29, 1985
68	6	"The Heart of Rock N' Roll"	Tony Mordente	Frank Lupo	November 5, 1985
69	7	"Body Slam"	Craig R. Baxley	Bill Nuss	November 12, 1985
70	8	"Blood, Sweat, and Cheers"	Sidney Hayers	Tom Blomquist	November 19, 1985
71	9	"Mind Games"	Michael O'Herlihy	Stephen J. Cannell	November 26, 1985
72	10	"There Goes the Neighborhood"	Dennis Donnelly	Bill Nuss	December 3, 1985
73	11	"The Doctor Is Out"	David Hemmings	Richard Christian Matheson & Thomas Szollosi	December 10, 1985
74	12	"Uncle Buckle-Up"	Michael O'Herlihy	Danny Lee Cole	December 17, 1985
75	13	"Wheel of Fortune"	David Hemmings	Bill Nuss	January 14, 1986
76	14	"The A-Team Is Coming, the A-Team Is Coming"	David Hemmings	Steve Beers	January 21, 1986
77	15	"Members Only"	Tony Mordente	Bill Nuss	January 28, 1986
78	16	"Cowboy George"	Tony Mordente	Stephen J. Cannell	February 11, 1986
79	17	"Waiting for Insane Wayne"	Craig R. Baxley	Stephen J. Cannell & Frank Lupo	February 18, 1986
80	18	"The Duke of Whispering Pines"	Sidney Hayers	Jayne C. Ehrlich	February 25, 1986
81	19	"Beneath the Surface"	Michael O'Herlihy	Story by : Lloyd J. Schwartz; Teleplay by : Danny Lee Cole	March 4, 1986
82	20	"Mission of Peace"	Craig R. Baxley	Steven L. Sears & Burt Pearl	March 11, 1986
83	21	"The Trouble with Harry"	David Hemmings	Bull Nuss	March 25, 1986
84	22	"A Little Town with an Accent"	Michael O'Herlihy	Richard Christian Matheson & Thomas Szollosi	May 6, 1986
85	23	"The Sound of Thunder"	Michael O'Herlihy	Frank Lupo	May 13, 1986

=== Season 5 (1986–87) ===
No. overall	No. in season	Title	Directed by	Written by	Original release date
86	1	"Dishpan Man"	Tony Mordente	Stephen J. Cannell	September 26, 1986
87	2	"Trial by Fire"	Les Sheldon	Tom Blomquist	October 3, 1986
88	3	"Firing Line"	Michael O'Herlihy	Frank Lupo	October 10, 1986
89	4	"Quarterback Sneak"	Craig R. Baxley	Paul Birnbaum	October 17, 1986
90	5	"The Theory of Revolution"	Sidney Hayers	Burt Pearl & Steven L. Sears	October 24, 1986
91	6	"The Say U.N.C.L.E. Affair"	Michael O'Herlihy	Terry D. Nelson	October 31, 1986
92	7	"Alive at Five"	Craig R. Baxley	Bill Nuss	November 7, 1986
93	8	"Family Reunion"	James Darren	Steven L. Sears	November 14, 1986
94	9	"Point of No Return"	Bob Bralver	Burt Pearl	November 18, 1986
95	10	"The Crystal Skull"	Michael O'Herlihy	Bill Nuss	November 28, 1986
96	11	"The Spy Who Mugged Me"	Michael O'Herlihy	Paul Bernbaum	December 12, 1986
97	12	"The Grey Team"	Michael O'Herlihy	Tom Blomquist	December 30, 1986
98	13	"Without Reservations"	John Peter Kousakis	Bill Nuss	March 8, 1987
