= The A-Team season 2 =

The A-Team
- Season 2
- Original season 2 DVD cover
- No. of episodes: 23

Release
- Original network: NBC
- Original release: September 20, 1983 – May 15, 1984

Season chronology
- ← Previous; Season 1 Next → Season 3

The second season of the action-adventure television series The A-Team premiered in the United States on NBC on September 20, 1983, and concluded on May 15, 1984, consisting of 23 episodes.

== Cast ==
- George Peppard as Lieutenant Colonel/Colonel John "Hannibal" Smith
- Dirk Benedict as First Lieutenant Templeton "Faceman" Peck
- Melinda Culea as journalist/reporter Amy Amanda "Triple A" Allen (11 Episodes Only)
- Dwight Schultz as Captain H. M. Murdock
- Mr. T as Sergeant First Class Bosco Albert "B. A." (Bad Attitude) Baracus
- Marla Heasley as journalist/reporter Tawnia Baker (7 episodes)

== Episodes ==
No. overall	No. in season	Title	Directed by	Written by	Original release date
15	1	"Diamonds 'n Dust"	Ron Satlof	Patrick Hasburgh	September 20, 1983
The A-Team is hired by the daughter of a deceased diamond mine owner; their mission is to get the mine up and running, with half of the first profit going to them. However, they must transport dynamite to do it, and standing in their way are the thugs of a greedy and ruthless businessman.
16	2	"Recipe for Heavy Bread"	Bernard McEveety	Stephen J. Cannell	September 27, 1983
When the A-Team come across an old Vietnamese cook that they recognize as the man that helped them survive captivity in a POW camp during the war, they must help him against the camp's brutal commander who now seeks revenge for their escape. They also discover that a US traitor in the POW camp is now the general's partner in a heroin smuggling operation. Special Guest Star: Mako as Lin Duk Coo; John Fujioka as General Chow; Marjoe Gortner as Lt. Tom Anderson aka Thomas Angel Michael Alldredge as Don
17	3	"The Only Church in Town"	Christian I. Nyby II	Babs Greyhosky	October 11, 1983
Face receives his old fraternity pin in the mail, to him a sign that an old girlfriend of his is in trouble. Unable to convince the others to help him, Face must hire the A-Team to track the woman down to Ecuador, where she has become a nun. His fears turn out to be justified when they learn she and the rest of the convent are being held prisoner by a group of wanted bandits. Special Guest Star: Markie Post as Leslie Bektall
18	4	"Bad Time on the Border"	Bruce Kessler	Richard Christian Matheson & Thomas Szollosi	October 18, 1983
A young girl appears at B.A.'s youth center and he discovers that she has escaped from a group of people smugglers who are holding her ill mother and others captive before transporting them into America as slave labor in a clothing sweatshop. The A-Team go to the rescue, but when Hannibal goes undercover and is captured, the others must race to save both him and the girl's mother. Guest Stars: Jack Ging as Lt. Jack Taggart; Dennis Lipscomb as Prince; Joey Aresco as Presley; David Graf as Cooper; Jeffrey Josephson as Kirk; Maria Heasley as Cherise; Carlos Lacamara as Carlos; Bert Santos as Fernando; Javier Grajeda as Roberto; Edie Marie Rubio as Maria; Scott Nemes as Robert
19	5	"When You Comin' Back, Range Rider?"	Christian I. Nyby II	Frank Lupo	October 25, 1983
20	6	"When You Comin' Back, Range Rider?"	Christian I. Nyby II	Frank Lupo	October 25, 1983
The A-team is hired by a native American from the Midwest to protect a herd of wild mustangs from being slaughtered. Meanwhile, a new Military Police pursuer is introduced in the form of Colonel Roderick Decker, and he will stop at nothing to apprehend the A-Team. Soon the A-Team must try to find of evidence of the mustangs' illegal rustling as quickly as possible before they are captured themselves by Decker and the Military Police. With enemies coming from two sides, it is ultimately up to Murdock to save his friends. Notes: First appearance of Lance LeGault in the role of Colonel Roderick Decker.: Originally shown as a feature-length episode, which was later cut into two separate episodes for syndication.; Because of Decker (who would put her under constant surveillance), Amy begins to lose touch with the A-Team; Special Guest Star: Morgan Woodward as Bus Carter
21	7	"The Taxicab Wars"	Gilbert M. Shilton	Stephen J. Cannell	November 1, 1983
The Lone Star cab company is faced with the overzealous Love Cab company, which is trying to force them out of business; worse, the Love Cab meters are rigged and they sell narcotics out of the trunks. The A-Team is hired by the company and become involved with a war between cab companies on the streets of Los Angeles. Will Love Cab win? Not if Murdock's new superhero persona, Captain Cab, has anything to say about it. In the end, Hannibal tricks the owner into attacking Lone Star HQ, catching him in the act of vandalism and murder, leaving him for the police. Special Guest Star: Michael Ironside as Miller Crane, Ernie Hudson as Cal Freeman
22	8	"Labor Pains"	Arnold Laven	Richard Christian Matheson & Thomas Szollosi	November 8, 1983
Hannbial uses his usual plan of making Decker think the A-Team left the state, to throw him off their trail; they instead hide out in a small town, only to find that a group of itinerant workers are being exploited by a malignant landowner. Murdock's lunacy for the episode is using a Ouija board. The A-Team step in to help, and encourage the workers to form a union. As usual, the A-Team takes off the moment the military show up. Special Guest Star: John Vernon as Ted Jarrett
23	9	"There's Always a Catch"	Ron Satlof	Richard Christian Matheson & Thomas Szollosi	November 15, 1983
Hotly pursued by Decker, the team seek medical help for B.A. in the hospital of a fishing town. While there they meet a family who tell them of a man extorting the fishermen of the town and causing depletion of the lobster beds. The team decide to help the town out, but need to go to great lengths to avoid the clutches of Decker.
24	10	"Water, Water Everywhere"	Sidney Hayers	Story by : Sidney Ellis; Teleplay by : Jo Swerling, Jr. and Sidney Ellis	November 22, 1983
Three partially disabled Vietnam War veterans (one played by wheelchair athlete Jim Knaub) attempt to establish a hotel in a small desert town. Their property impacts access to a water bore for a wealthy local rancher who tries to run them out of town, by sending in thugs to damage their hotel. The trio tell Murdock of their plight at the VA Hospital, and the A-Team volunteer their services to come to their aid.
25	11	"Steel"	Gilbert M. Shilton	Frank Lupo	November 29, 1983
The A-Team are hired by a construction company who become involved in a turf battle with a larger opposition company over the demolition of an old high-rise building. Things become far more serious when they realise the opposition are backed by a big-time mobster who buried his partner in the foundations years before.: This episode features an in-joke (used in the series opening credits from there on) at Universal Studios where a Cylon centurion walks past Face (Dirk Benedict, who played Lieutenant Starbuck in Battlestar Galactica); Special Guest Star: Norman Alden as Mickey Stern
26	12	"The White Ballot"	Dennis Donnelly	Jeff Ray	December 6, 1983
A journalist friend of Amy tells her of a corrupt sheriff in his small hometown who has threatened him about reporting on the town's problems. The A-Team agree to intervene and Face poses as a returning local war hero in order to run for sheriff in an upcoming election. Things get more complex when Decker sees Face's photograph on the wire and comes in pursuit. Note: Final Appearance of Amy. Special Guest Star: Clifton James as Sheriff Jake Dawson
27	13	"The Maltese Cow"	Dennis Donnelly	Richard Christian Matheson & Thomas Szollosi	December 13, 1983
A Chinese tong looking to expand their business in LA try to raise money by running a protection racket on local businesses. One of their targets is a Vietnamese friend of The A-Team, whose restaurant the team part own. The A-Team step into help, but along the way must deal with the tong targeting their friend's family and a brush with the LAPD. Special Guest Star: Keye Luke as Sam Yeng
28	14	"In Plane Sight"	Tony Mordente	Babs Greyhosky	January 3, 1984
When a courier pilot crash lands in Venezuela, he is found to be smuggling cocaine, to his surprise, and is imprisoned. Convinced of his innocence, his family hire the A-Team to seek out those behind the operation both in the US and South America. The team must deal with both the Federales and the international drug lord behind the operation in their investigations. Note: B.A. is temporarily hypnotized into falling asleep with a key word, but is released from it by the end of the episode. Lance Henriksen as one of the 'bad guys'
29	15	"The Battle of Bel Air"	Gilbert M. Shilton	Frank Lupo	January 10, 1984
A reporter friend of Amy, Tawnia Baker, moonlights as a clerk in a major security firm and discovers that Decker is about to pounce on The A-Team. She comes to warn them, but in the process some corrupt heads in the company suspect she has stumbled on their plans to murder one of their clients, a major oil-sheikh, and come in pursuit of her. The team inadvertently take on the job of saving both Baker and the sheikh. Kurtwood Smith stars as one of the security firm's evil executives.
30	16	"Say It With Bullets"	Dennis Donnelly	Richard Christian Matheson & Thomas Szollosi	January 17, 1984
The A-Team are hired by a servicewoman whose brother has been killed by a corrupt officer selling army weapons on the black market. When she double-crosses the team in exchange for Decker's promise to put away the guilty officer, The A-Team are forced to take on both the arms' traders and an entire army base. The team sets up its escape by tricking Decker's team of National Guardsmen into heavily damaging a guest house on an army base (through machine-gun fire) by -- through use of a sound-effects record -- making them think they're being fired upon. Special Guest Star: Monte Markham as Lt. Mason Harnett
31	17	"Pure-Dee Poison"	Dennis Donnelly	Allan Cole & Chris Bunch	January 31, 1984
A small town preacher takes on an illegal moonshine operation which is causing sickness and death amongst the district's population. However, the moonshine operators wound the preacher as a warning. Unable to continue his crusade alone, he hires The A-Team to come in and help shut the operation down. Special Guest Star: Bo Hopkins as Charlie Drew
32	18	"It's a Desert Out There"	Arnold Laven	Bruce Cervi	February 7, 1984
When some elderly patrons of a small-time casino just over the Nevada border are robbed by bandits known as "The Scorpions" as they return to Los Angeles, they hire The A-Team to track the offenders down. The team discover that the bandits intend to murder their imprisoned former leader while en route to LA to testify against them, and intervene to attempt to prevent the hit and capture the bandits. Special Guest Star: Tony Burton as Burke
33	19	"Chopping Spree"	Michael O'Herlihy	Stephen Katz	February 14, 1984
When an acquaintance of B.A.'s working as a parking valet is accused of being involved in a car theft racket, the A-Team step in to help break it up. However B.A.'s van is inadvertently stolen as part of the operation, so the race is on to get to the bottom of the racket and recover the van before it is cut up for spare parts. Special Guest Star: Dennis Franz as Sam Friendly
34	20	"Harder Than It Looks"	Ivan Dixon	Babs Greyhosky	February 21, 1984
The A-Team are hired by a wealthy businessman to rescue his daughter who has been kidnapped by a group of terrorists who are now demanding a large ransom. Hannibal assures the team that the job will be "a piece of cake", but things turn out harder than they look when they find that the girl is reluctant to be saved because her boyfriend is one of the kidnappers, and her father only wants her saved to maintain his public appearance. In the end, the A-Team saves the girl, stops a terrorist group and donates the money to the daughter. When Hannibal finds out they've been double-crossed by their client, he tells him "we're like socks. You can put us through a rough wash once, but you'll never use us again."
35	21	"Deadly Maneuvers"	Mike Vejar	Richard Christian Matheson & Thomas Szollosi	February 28, 1984
Concerned that the team's work has been becoming sloppy, Hannibal leads them on a series of training manoeuvres; frustrating Face and B.A., while Murdock is more than willing. Elsewhile, a corrupt group of wealthy individuals have had enough of the A-Team's interference plummeting their profits. As a result, they hire four highly skilled mercenaries to take out the team - sort of a Negative A-Team/Z-Team - when they're off guard. Reappearance of Tricia O'Neil as the doctor from Season 1's "Black Day at Bad Rock". Special Guest Star: Ed Lauter as Maj. Douglas Kyle
36	22	"Semi-Friendly Persuasion"	Craig R. Baxley	Danny Lee Cole	May 8, 1984
A pacifist religious community is intimidated by a group of small town bullies who want to run them off their land, an experience they have faced elsewhere. Tired of running, one of the community seeks the help of The A-Team. In contrast to their usual methods, the A-Team must try to deal with the thugs while adhering to the non-violent beliefs of the community. Much to the annoyance of everyone but Hannibal, the pacifists decide to leave and try elsewhere as the A-Team had to use violence. Hannibal tells the preacher that it is okay to believe in non-violence, but to some other people it is quite stupid. Special Guest Star: Geoffrey Lewis as Kale Sykes
37	23	"Curtain Call"	Dennis Donnelly	Stephen Katz	May 15, 1984
While finishing up a job in an isolated town, and with Decker in hot pursuit, Murdock is shot by one of the perpetrators. The A-Team must try to treat the ailing Murdock as the army rapidly closes the net on them. This second season finale is a partial clip show episode.
