= Parker Center =

Former headquarters of the Los Angeles Police Department

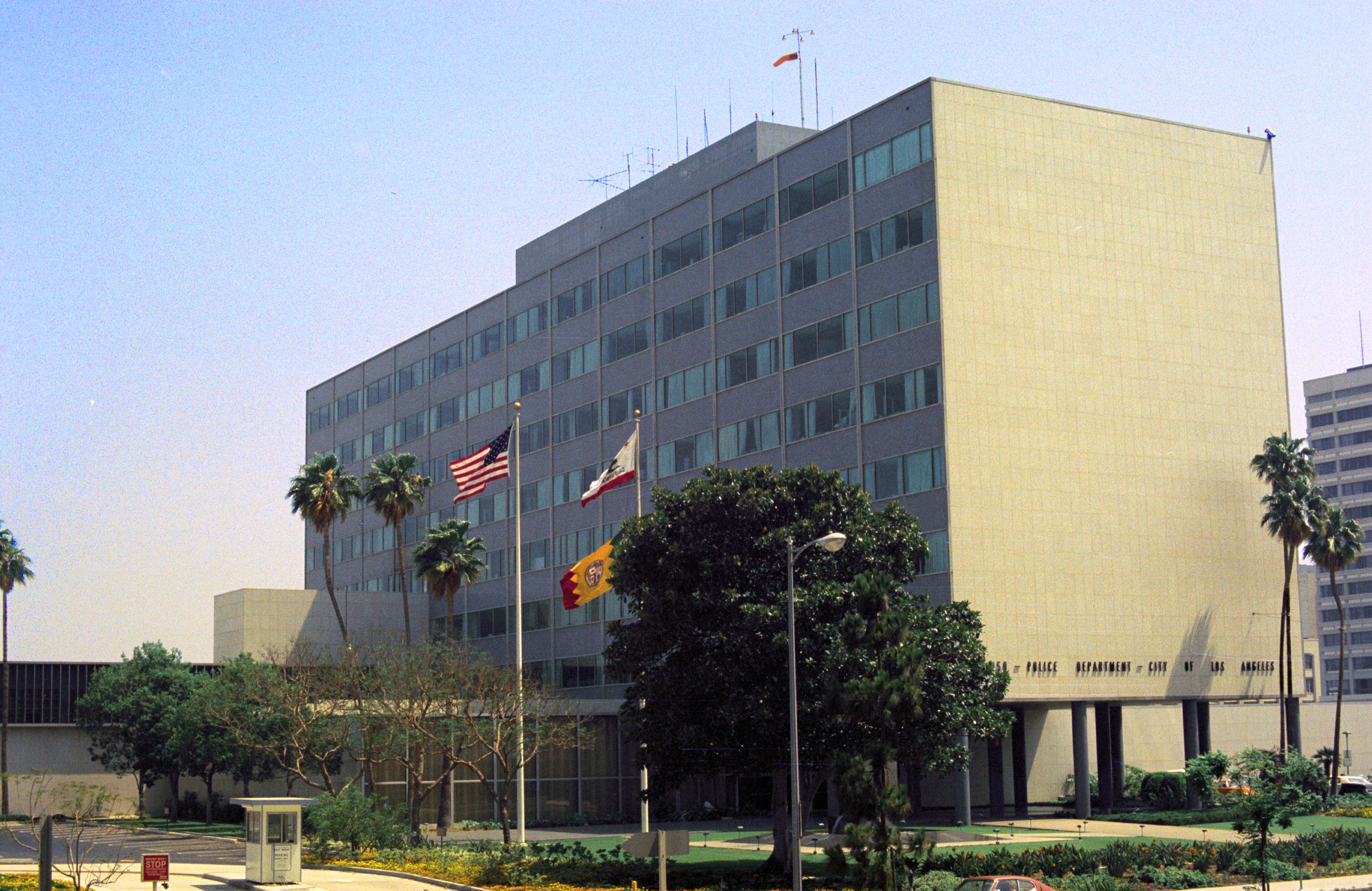
- Parker Center in 1976
- Interactive map of the Parker Center area
- Alternative names: Police Administration Building; Police Facilities Building "The Glass House" (unofficial)

General information
- Architectural style: International Style
- Location: 150 North Los Angeles Street, Los Angeles, California, United States
- Coordinates: 34.051926°N 118.240748°W
- Construction started: 1952
- Completed: 1955
- Opened: 1955
- Closed: October 2009
- Demolished: 2019
- Cost: $6,142,548
- Owner: Los Angeles Police Department

Technical details
- Floor count: 8

Design and construction
- Architects: Welton Becket; J. E. Stanton
- Architecture firm: Welton Becket & Associates

Parker Center, initially named the Police Administration Building or Police Facilities Building, was the former headquarters of the Los Angeles Police Department from 1955 until October 2009. It was located in Downtown Los Angeles at 150 North Los Angeles Street. Often nicknamed "The Glass House", the building was named for former LAPD chief William H. Parker in 1966.

The LAPD moved to a different headquarters building in 2009 after the Parker Center became outdated. After the building was shifted to mostly secondary use, and attempts to preserve the building failed, the Los Angeles Bureau of Engineering recommended its demolition. Demolition and razing of the Parker Center was approved in 2017, and completed in 2019. Plans to replace the building with the Los Angeles Street Civic Building were scrapped in 2020 due to a lack of funds.

== History ==
The location was previously home to the Olympic Hotel and other buildings of the city's 19th-century downtown.

Groundbreaking for the center began on December 30, 1952, and construction was completed in 1955. On July 16, 1966, Parker suffered a fatal heart attack after a testimonial dinner. The Los Angeles City Council renamed the building the "Parker Center" in his honor on January 25, 1967.

The architect was Welton Becket & Associates and J.E. Stanton, associated architect. Maynard Woodard was director of design and Francis Runcy was the project architect. The eight-story building was of reinforced concrete with aluminum sash windows covered by louvers. Ceramic tile by Gladding, McBean covered the west elevation. The building combined police facilities that had been located throughout the Civic Center area. The jail area was built without window bars, utilizing non-breakable tempered glass, and neoprene floors to reduce self-injuries. A special control board in the lineup room could simulate different lighting conditions and a wire screen that acted like a one-way mirror. The Statistical Unit made the LAPD the first police department to install IBM computer equipment. The laboratories of the Scientific Investigation Division took up the entire fourth floor and included early versions of a breath-based alcohol impairment test. The new building was called "ultramodern in all respects" and "the jail that modern science built" by Popular Mechanics in 1956.

Two prominent artworks were commissioned for the building, a large bronze modernist sculpture by Bernard Rosenthal mounted at the entrance titled "The American Family" and a mosaic work in the lobby depicting architectural landmarks of Los Angeles by Joseph Young. The mural, mounted a few feet off the ground, was six feet high and 36 feet long, was Young's first public work. American Artist magazine called it "six tons of steel, copper, aluminum and glass, fused into a monolithic mosaic panel of beauty and permanence that seems to float on air." Both artworks were removed in 2018.

The building was one of the sites of unrest during the 1992 Los Angeles riots that followed a not guilty verdict for the four police officers involved in the Rodney King incident.

== Redevelopment ==
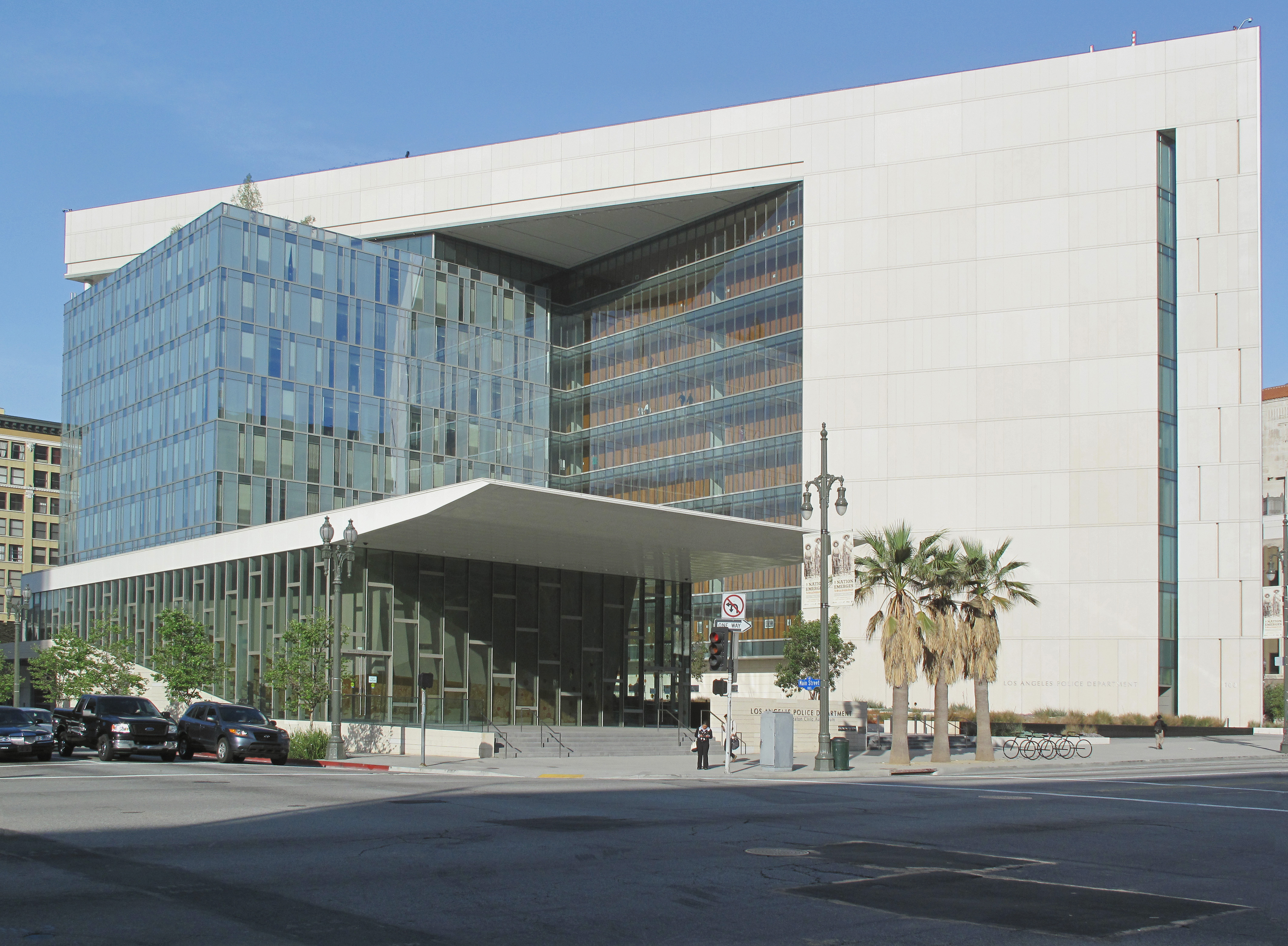
New LAPD Headquarters, at corner of E 1st Street and S Main Street

With time, the Parker Center became outdated and was in need of expensive seismic retrofits. After considering a number of downtown sites for a new facility, the city council selected a property directly south of City Hall, Caltrans' former Los Angeles headquarters. Ground was broken for the new building in January 2007, which was dedicated on October 24, 2009. The LAPD Robbery–Homicide Division still operated from an annex of the Old Parker Center.

On January 15, 2013, the City of Los Angeles permanently closed Parker Center. In 2014, the City Department of Public Works and the Bureau of Engineering recommended razing the now-vacant Parker Center in favor of building a 27-story tower in its place. The razing would proceed on a floor-by-floor process, eliminating the need for wrecking balls or dynamiting. Construction of the new building would start in 2016 and last 18–24 months, with completion anticipated in 2018.

=== Efforts to save Parker Center ===
On January 29, 2015, a city panel, The Cultural Heritage Commission, nominated Parker Center for historical status. A tentative date for the ruling was set for April 28, 2015. However, the ruling was postponed until May 5, 2015. During the council meeting held on May 5, 2015, the council claimed to have "lost jurisdiction over this item" due to not having acted within a 105-day time limit. Committee chairman and 14th District Councilman José Huizar presented a new motion recommending against the razing of the building, instead preserving it and "build[ing] an adjacent tower taller than the one analyzed in the project's already complete environmental impact report". Following these developments, a group of civic leaders and land-use experts convened in May 2015 to discuss the future of Parker Center. They considered whether the building should be preserved, with some of the panel members suggesting that parts of the Parker Center could be preserved while other sections could be razed.

In August 2015, it was reported that discussions had expanded and now involved not just the future of the building itself, but also what should be done with surrounding areas and the district as a whole. This suggested the possibility of an alternative location for the proposed office buildings intended to be erected on the plot currently inhabited by the Parker Center. Three options were considered for the Parker Center.

1. Updating the 319,000-square-foot edifice with improvements including seismic retrofitting and expanding the parking garage to provide another 137 spaces.
2. Rehabilitating some of the building while tearing down the dilapidated Parker Center jail while creating more than 522,000 square feet of usable space.
3. Razing the building and replacing it with either one or two office structures with a total of about 750,000 square feet of space and 1,173 parking spaces.

== Demolition ==
In August 2016, Parker Center was threatened by demolition again. A report from the Bureau of Engineering revealed a proposal to build a new municipal office building on the existing site of Parker Center. The Cultural Heritage Commission mobilized another attempt the following month to award the Parker Center with a landmark status, after having failed to meet the deadline to do so during the preceding year.

In December 2016, the Bureau of Engineering once again recommended razing the building, saying that tearing down the structure and creating the new high-rise would cost $514 million, and that the preservation and smaller new edifice option would cost $621 million (both plans would have roughly the same amount of office space). The Bureau of Engineering's timetable suggested securing approvals by February 2017.

On March 24, 2017, City Council voted unanimously to approve a proposal to demolish Parker Center and replace it with an office tower that would consolidate offices of city employees. The above-ground demolition of Parker Center was completed on July 15, 2019.

== In popular culture ==
Parker Center appears in the police procedural media franchise Dragnet, beginning with the fifth season of the 1955 television series. It was most prominent in the 1967 - 1970 television series, where it appeared in a majority of episodes as the headquarters of most divisions except the Juvenile Division, which was on Georgia Street. Parker Center was also mentioned frequently in Adam-12.

The Parker Center appears in several establishing shots for the Perry Mason between 1958 and 1966. It appeared in seasons 3, 4 and 10 of Columbo. The NBC drama Hunter used the Parker Center in the sixth and seventh seasons. Parker Center is the location of the Priority Homicide Division, and later Major Crimes, in the television series The Closer.

Parker Center appears in the 1983 movie Blue Thunder, the 1992 movie One False Move, and the 1970-set 2014 film Inherent Vice. It was also referred to in the 1987 film Dragnet.

Parker Center appears as main location in 1984 TV series Hunter from season 6 and 7.

The building is featured as one of the main locations in the 1993 video game Police Quest: Open Season, the fourth installment of the Police Quest series.

Parker Center is often mentioned in the novels of the Harry Bosch series written by Michael Connelly, the Shane Scully series written by Stephen J. Cannell, and the Elvis Cole and Joe Pike series by Robert Crais.
