= Hardball (1989 TV series) =

American crime drama television series

- Genre: Action; Crime drama
- Created by: Robert Palm
- Written by: Paul Bernbaum; Chris Bunch; Allan Cole; Frank Lupo; Robert Palm; Burt Pearl
- Directed by: Rob Bowman; James Darren; Francis Delia; David Hemmings; Bruce Kessler; Guy Magar; Larry Shaw; Virgil W. Vogel
- Starring: John Ashton; Richard Tyson
- Theme music composer: Sylvester Levay; Eddie Money
- Opening theme: "Roll Over It" performed by Eddie Money
- Composer: Sylvester Levay
- Country of origin: United States
- Original language: English
- No. of seasons: 1
- No. of episodes: 18

Production
- Executive producers: John Ashley; Frank Lupo
- Producer: Paul Bernbaum
- Cinematography: Rick Bota
- Editors: Nathaniel Burr Smidt; David Ramirez
- Camera setup: Single-camera
- Running time: 45–48 minutes
- Production companies: Columbia Pictures Television; NBC Productions

Original release
- Network: NBC
- Release: September 21, 1989 – June 29, 1990

Hardball is an American crime drama television series that ran on NBC from September 21, 1989, to June 29, 1990, during the 1989–90 television schedule.

== Synopsis ==
Hardball is a variation of the buddy cop genre that focused on two plainclothes L.A. cops, Charlie "C.B." Battles (John Ashton) and Joe "Kaz" Kaczierowski (Richard Tyson). Battles is a 45-year-old hard-nosed veteran officer who is forced to take a desk job or retire. Battles is soon assigned a new partner, the 25-year-old hotshot Kaczierowski who follows his own set of rules when dealing with criminals. The pair are soon at odds over their respective methods of law enforcement.

NBC President Brandon Tartikoff saw this series as inspired by the Lethal Weapon films and Battles was patterned after Pete Rose.

== Cast ==
- John Ashton as Charlie "C.B." Battles
- Richard Tyson as Joe "Kaz" Kaczierowski
- John Pappas as Pappas
- Barney McFadden as Ballantine

== Production notes ==
The series was created by Robert Palm and executive produced by John Ashley and Frank Lupo.

=== Theme song ===
The series' theme song "Roll It Over", was written by Sylvester Levay, Mark Spiro, and Eddie Money. Money also performed the tune.

== Episodes ==
No.	Title	Directed by	Written by	Original release date
1	"Till Death Do Us Part"	David Hemmings	Frank Lupo	September 21, 1989
2	"The Silver Scream"	Larry Shaw	Story by : Burt Pearl; Teleplay by : Burt Pearl & Paul Bernbaum	September 28, 1989
3	"The One Armed Bandit"	Guy Magar	Paul Bernbaum	October 13, 1989
4	"Which Witch Is Which?"	David Hemmings	Story by : Burt Pearl; Teleplay by : Paul Bernbaum & Burt Pearl	October 27, 1989
5	"The Cleveland Indian"	David Hemmings	Story by : Burt Pearl; Teleplay by : Paul Bernbaum	November 3, 1989
6	"The Fighting 52nd"	David Hemmings	Paul Bernbaum	November 10, 1989
7	"Time Bomb"	James Darren	Burt Pearl	November 17, 1989
8	"Trying to Make a Living, and Doing the Best I Can"	David Hemmings	Paul Bernbaum	November 24, 1989
9	"The Out of Towner"	Rob Bowman	Story by : Frank Lupo; Teleplay by : Frank Lupo & Paul Bernbaum	December 1, 1989
10	"The Cool Katt"	Unknown	Unknown	April 20, 1990
11	"The Angel of Death"	David Hemmings	Frank Lupo	April 27, 1990
12	"A Killer Date"	David Hemmings	Paul Bernbaum	May 4, 1990
13	"A Death in the Family"	Francis Delia	Story by : Frank Lupo; Teleplay by : Paul Bernbaum	May 11, 1990
14	"Sex, Cops, and Videotape"	James Darren	Frank Lupo & Paul Bernbaum	May 18, 1990
15	"Wedding Bell Blues"	Guy Magar	Paul Bernbaum	June 1, 1990
16	"Prescription for Murder"	Virgil W. Vogel	Paul Bernbaum	June 8, 1990
17	"Every Dog Has His Day"	David Hemmings	Burt Pearl	June 22, 1990
18	"The Hunt for Honus Wagner"	Bruce Kessler	Chris Bunch & Allan Cole	June 29, 1990
