= List of Buck Rogers in the 25th Century episodes =

Buck Rogers in the 25th Century is an American science-fiction and adventure series produced by Universal Studios and ran on NBC from September 20, 1979 to April 16, 1981. It first aired in the United Kingdom on ITV on August 30, 1980.

== Series overview ==
Season	Episodes	Originally released	
Season	Episodes	First released	Last released
1	24	September 20, 1979	March 27, 1980
2	13	January 15, 1981	April 16, 1981

== Episodes ==
=== Season 1 (1979–80) ===
No. overall	No. in season	Title	Directed by	Written by	Original release date	Prod. code
1	1	"Awakening"	Daniel Haller	Glen A. Larson & Leslie Stevens	September 20, 1979	82110
2	2	"Awakening"	Daniel Haller	Glen A. Larson & Leslie Stevens	September 20, 1979	82110
In 1987, lone NASA astronaut Buck Rogers is piloting Earth's last Space Shuttle mission, Ranger 3, when a storm of ice meteors shuts down life support and he is frozen for 504 years. He awakens in the year 2491 aboard the alien flagship Draconia which is headed to Earth disguised as a diplomatic mission. The Draconians repair Buck's shuttle, but secretly plant a homing beacon aboard to track its way through Earth's defense shield. Upon arriving at Earth, Buck is escorted to the city of New Chicago by starfighters commanded by Colonel Wilma Deering. Once at the city, Buck is met by Dr. Elias Huer who tells him he is now in the 25th century and that everyone he knew had been killed centuries ago in a nuclear holocaust. When the tracking device is discovered, the authorities accuse Buck of espionage, but Buck claims the Draconians have set him up and that their representative, the ravishing Princess Ardala, is arriving in an armed warship which violates the peace treaty with Earth. The authorities refuse to believe Buck and sentence him to be executed. However, Wilma has second thoughts and arranges to give Buck a chance to prove his innocence. Wilma and Buck lead a force of Starfighters to the Draconian ship to surreptitiously search it, but before they can the ship is attacked by seven Marauders (in reality Draconian ships masquerading as pirates); in the ensuing combat Buck shoots down most of the attackers and saves Wilma's life. When a celebration of the treaty with Draconia ensues on Earth, Buck sets out to prove the Draconians' hostile intent by seducing Ardala, returning with her to the Draconian ship, and sabotaging her attack fighters before she can launch them against Earth. Note: This two-hour pilot episode is a revised version of the theatrical release Buck Rogers in the 25th Century, with a different opening credit sequence, additional scenes, and also the use of Vic Perrin as voice of the Draconia's PA system. It was syndicated as a two-part episode. Guest stars: Henry Silva (as Kane), Duke Butler (as Tigerman), H.B. Haggerty (as Tigerman #2), Vic Perrin (uncredited and replacing William Conrad as Draconia PA announcer), and Pamela Hensley (as Princess Ardala). (Note: Joseph Wiseman appeared briefly in the theatrical version as King Draco, but does not appear in the TV version)
3	3	"Planet of the Slave Girls"	Michael Caffey	T : Anne Collins; S/T : Steve Greenberg & Aubrey Solomon	September 27, 1979	53408
4	4	"Planet of the Slave Girls"	Michael Caffey	T : Anne Collins; S/T : Steve Greenberg & Aubrey Solomon	September 27, 1979	53408
The Earth Defense Directorate faces a crisis when nearly everyone becomes sick after eating poisoned food. An attempt is made to create an antidote, but the plan is thwarted when the laboratory is sabotaged and an assassin takes aim at Dr. Huer. Buck and Wilma then pursue leads to the planet Vistula where the contaminated food was exported from and there, they find a world engaged in slave labor. A slave girl named Ryma, hopeful Buck will help her people, informs him about the food processing center where the food is being poisoned. Buck and Wilma then discover the poisoning is part of an elaborate plot by a fanatical religious leader and slave trader with paranormal powers named Kaleel. After Wilma is captured, Buck and Major Duke Danton, (Wilma's former boyfriend), attempt to rescue her from Kaleel's mountain fortress. Meanwhile, Kaleel plans to invade Earth with a secret strike force while their defenses are incapacitated. Note: This was a two-hour episode, later syndicated as a two-part episode. Guest stars: Jack Palance (as Kaleel), David Groh (as Major Duke Danton), Roddy McDowall (as Governor Toban Saroyan), Brianne Leary (as Ryma), Sheila DeWindt (as Major Fields), Robert Dowdell (as Galen), Macdonald Carey (as Dr. Mallory), Karen Carlson (as Stella Warden), and Michael Mullins (as Regis Saroyan). It also features a special appearance by Buster Crabbe (who played Buck Rogers in the original serial), playing Brigadier Gordon (a reference to his other famous role, Flash Gordon).
5	5	"Vegas in Space"	Sigmund Neufeld, Jr.	Anne Collins	October 4, 1979	53406
A young woman, Felina Redding, is kidnapped and her employer, a notorious smuggler named Amos Armat, comes to Dr. Huer for help. Armat believes his competitor, the feared crime boss Morgan Velosi, kidnapped Felina because she knows too much about his organization after stumbling upon a computer code that controls three-fourths of Armat's covert operations. If helped, Armat offers to turn himself in for his crimes, for Felina is not only an employee, but his daughter as well (a fact of which she is unaware). Huer initially refuses but is persuaded by Major Marla Landers when she questions that Armat has technical secrets of Draconian Marauders that have been preying on Earth's shipping lanes. Buck takes the mission alongside Major Landers and the two arrive at Velosi's orbital casino resort of Sinaloa. While Landers uses her charm to distract Velosi, Buck rescues Felina before a hired interrogator, Carl Morphus, can conduct a potentially fatal mind probe on her. However, they must all escape an attack by Draconian fighters summoned by Velosi. Guest stars: Cesar Romero (as Amos Armat), Ana Alicia (as Felina Redding), Richard Lynch (as Morgan Velosi), Juanin Clay (as Major Marla Landers), Pamela Susan Shoop (as Tangie), and Joseph Wiseman (as Carl Morphus).
6	6	"The Plot to Kill a City: Part I"	Dick Lowry	Alan Brennert	October 11, 1979	53402
After capturing Raphael Argus, a notorious assassin, Buck learns that the killer is to attend a meeting with a group of terrorists known as the "Legion of Death" on the planet Aldebaran II. Since none of the group knows what Argus looks like, Buck assumes his identity and goes in his place. Buck meets the group's leader Seton Kellogg, and learns that each member has a unique ability – Sharese is an empath, capable of reading the emotions of other people; Jolen Quince is a telekinetic who can move objects with the power of his mind; Marcos has superior strength, and Varek is a mutant with the power to walk through solid matter. Argus was a master combatant and Buck passes Kellogg's test of skill. Buck's true identity is briefly questioned by the presence of Joella Cameron, one of Argus's girlfriends, but she goes along with the deception to help Buck. However, his cover is eventually blown when an informant named Barney, who knew the real Argus, confirms he is an impostor. Guest stars: Frank Gorshin (as Seton Kellogg), John Quade (as Jolen Quince), Robert Tessier (as Marcos), Nancy DeCarl (as Sharese), Victor Argo (as Raphael Argus), Markie Post (as Joella Cameron), James Sloyan (as Barnard "Barney" Smith), James McEachin (as Richard Selvan), Anthony James (as Varek), and Whitney Rydbeck (as Harsteen).
7	7	"The Plot to Kill a City: Part II"	Dick Lowry	Alan Brennert	October 18, 1979	53403
Buck had learned the group's plan to destroy New Chicago by sabotaging the city's antimatter power plant, and he and Joella race back to Earth to stop them. Guest stars: Frank Gorshin (as Seton Kellogg), John Quade (as Jolen Quince), Robert Tessier (as Marcos), Nancy DeCarl (as Sharese), Victor Argo (as Raphael Argus), Markie Post (as Joella Cameron), James Sloyan (as Barnard "Barney" Smith), James McEachin (as Richard Selvan), Anthony James (as Varek), and Whitney Rydbeck (as Harsteen).
8	8	"Return of the Fighting 69th"	Philip Leacock	David Carren	October 25, 1979	53410
Buck and Wilma go after a notorious gunrunner named Corliss who has stolen a stockpile of deadly nerve agent from the 20th-Century and plans to attack Earth with it. When two rookie pilots (Cadets Clayton and Westlake) are killed trying to pursue Corliss to his base within the treacherous asteroid belt, Wilma reluctantly seeks the help of a long-retired fighter pilot named Noah Cooper and his legendary "Fighting 69th" squadron. Because of their age, Wilma has doubts about the squadron's reliability, but Noah's team sets out to prove they still have what it takes to get the mission done. During the attack, Buck and Wilma are captured by Corliss and his wife Roxanne Trent who both show off horrible scars from injuries they received thanks to Wilma during a previous confrontation. Wanting Buck and Wilma to suffer as they did, Corliss plans to torture them once he deals with the geriatric bombers. Eventually, Roxanne's deaf/mute slave girl Alicia helps Buck and Wilma escape, and the three hurry to escape the complex before the ensuing bombing run. Guest stars: Peter Graves (as Major Noah Cooper), Elizabeth Allen (as Roxanne Trent), Robert Quarry (as Commander Corliss), Eddie Firestone (as Corporal M.K. Schultz), K. T. Stevens (as Lieutenant Harriet Twain), Katherine Wiberg (as Alicia), Woody Strode (as Sergeant "Big Red" MacMurthy), Dan Sturkie (as Eli Twain), Robert Hardy (as Cadet Clayton), and Duncan McKenzie (as Cadet Westlake).
9	9	"Unchained Woman"	Dick Lowry	Bill Taylor	November 1, 1979	53409
Posing as a prisoner named Valzhan, Buck is taken to an underground penal colony on the third moon of Zeta where he springs a female inmate named Jen Burton. Jen is wanted by the Earth's Directorate so she can testify about the criminal activities of her pirate boyfriend Malary Pantera. However, Pantera happens to have a business associate back on Earth, Ted Warwick, the Zetan government diplomat whose involvement could be exposed if Jen testifies. While Buck and Jen try to rendezvous with Wilma, Warwick tips off Pantera and he sends his goons after them. However, Buck and Jen's worst problem is a malfunctioning android prison guard, damaged during Jen's prison break, that is bent on destroying the both of them. Guest stars: Jamie Lee Curtis (as Jen Burton), Michael DeLano (as Malary Pantera), Bert Rosario (as Serio Sanwiler), Tara Buckman (as Majel), Walter Hunter (as "Hugo" the Android), Robert Cornthwaite (as Ted Warwick), Daniel Ades (as Gymon), Jim B. Smith (as Shuttle Captain) and Charles Walker (as Lieutenant Zimmerman).
10	10	"Planet of the Amazon Women"	Philip Leacock	D. C. Fontana & Richard Fontana	November 8, 1979	53413
Buck helps two sisters whose ship is found adrift above the planet Xantia. After towing them home, a man named Cassius Thorne takes Buck into custody and has him sold at auction as a mate to the Prime Minister's daughter Ariela Dyne. Buck learns from other male prisoners that Thorne has a lucrative business in kidnapping men to sell to the women of his planet since most of Xantia's males were killed or captured in a war with the neighboring planet Ruatha. After meeting Ariela, Buck finds the girl strongly opposed to slavery and plans to end her mother's reign. Meanwhile, Wilma arrives looking for Buck and learns that Ariela is planning to meet with the Ruathan leader and expose the truth that Xantia has no warriors. Wilma tries to stop Ariela before the fragile political repercussions drag Earth into war as well. Guest stars: Ann Dusenberry (as Ariela Dyne), Jay Robinson (as Cassius Thorne), Antoinette Stella (as Jayel), Wendy Oates (as Renna), Liberty Godshall (as Nyree), Darrell Zwerling (as Macon), Teddi Siddall (as Linea), Wally K. Berns (as Major Norris), James Fraracci (as Karsh), and Anne Jeffreys (as Prime Minister Dyne).
11	11	"Cosmic Whiz Kid"	Leslie H. Martinson	T : Alan Brennert; S : Anne Collins	November 15, 1979	53414
Buck is forced away from a vacation trip by Lieutenant Dia Cyrton who is the bodyguard of a 493-year-old, child super-genius, Hieronymus Fox – the president of the planet Genesia. Originally from Earth's 20th-Century, Fox developed advanced cryogenics technology and had himself frozen before the nuclear holocaust. After being thawed in the 25th-Century, Fox helped the struggling Genesia colony and they made him their leader. Now the boy has been kidnapped for ransom by a political dissident named Roderick Zale who holds Fox captive on Aldebaran II. Buck and Dia work to infiltrate Zale's hideout and must dodge elaborate security fields and a superhuman assassin before Zale carries out his threat to kill Fox. Guest stars: Gary Coleman (as Hieronymus Fox), Ray Walston (as Roderick Zale), Melody Rogers (as Lieutenant Dia Cyrton), Albert Popwell (as Koren), Earl Boen (as Selmar), and Lester Fletcher (as M.D. Toman).
12	12	"Escape from Wedded Bliss"	David Moessinger	T : Alan Brennert; S/T : Anne Collins	November 29, 1979	53411
Princess Ardala attacks New Chicago with an indestructible alien weapon and orders the Earth leaders to hand over Buck Rogers or she will destroy every city on the planet. Instead of turning himself over, Buck goes off to find a man named Garedon – a Draconian defector living in seclusion on Earth who knows the layout of Ardala's warship. Unfortunately, the man is insane with fear of being captured and the only way to learn what he knows is to probe his mind. In the meantime, Buck surrenders to Ardala who wants him to marry her in exchange for sparing Earth. Buck plays along until Wilma and Dr. Huer can relay the location of the alien weapon control system so he can destroy it and end Ardala's hold over Earth. Guest stars: Pamela Hensley (as Princess Ardala), Alfred Ryder (as Garedon), H.B. Haggerty (as Tigerman), and Michael Ansara (who replaced Henry Silva as Kane).
13	13	"Cruise Ship to the Stars"	Sigmund Neufeld, Jr.	T : Anne Collins; S/T : Alan Brennert	December 27, 1979	53412
After the galactic beauty queen "Miss Cosmos" is attacked by a mysterious woman, Buck and Wilma are assigned to protect her while she travels aboard a luxury space liner. There, Buck encounters a shy girl named Alison Michaels who suffers from periodic blackouts to which her boyfriend Jay Davin dismisses as mental stress brought on by hypertension. After another attack against Miss Cosmos, Buck confronts the assailant, a wild-haired woman named Sabrina who demonstrates superhuman strength and powerful psychokinetic abilities. When Buck checks on Alison, she confesses to having visions of committing crimes and hurting people. Buck begins suspecting that Sabrina and Alison are the same and that Jay is exploiting her abilities so that they can capture Miss Cosmos and sell her perfect genetics on the black market. Dr. Theopolis later confirms this and identifies Alison as a transmute, a split personality with the genetic ability to transform into an entirely separate entity during times of extreme emotional distress. Buck sets a trap for the alter persona in hopes of saving Alison from the monster that lurks inside her. Guest stars: Kimberly Beck (as Alison Michaels), Trisha Noble (as Sabrina), Leigh McCloskey (as Jalor "Jay" Davin), Brett Halsey (as the Cruise Ship Captain), Patty Maloney (as Tina), Timothy O'Hagan (as Gurney Langston, Jr.), and Dorothy Stratten (as Miss Cosmos).
14	14	"Space Vampire"	Larry Stewart	Kathleen Barnes & David Wise	January 3, 1980	53417
Buck and Wilma arrive at Theta Station to have Twiki serviced, but soon a freighter collides with the base. The freighter's crew are all found in a strange state that is somewhere between life and death, and believing a virus may be responsible, the station commander puts the base under quarantine. Soon however, Wilma feels a cold, evil presence stalking her and several station crew begin turning up "half-dead". Buck finds a video from the ship that recorded a man confronting an unseen attacker called a "Vorvon". He later learns that the Vorvon is a vampire-like being of legend that can drain the life energy from its victims and turn them into zombies. Soon the creature attacks Wilma and Buck sets a trap to destroy the monster before it turns her into a vampire like itself. Guest stars: Nicholas Hormann (as the Vorvon), Christopher Stone (as Commander Royko), Lincoln Kilpatrick (as Dr. Ecbar), Phil Hoover (as Helson), and Jeannie Fitzsimmons (as the Freighter Captain).
15	15	"Happy Birthday, Buck"	Sigmund Neufeld, Jr.	Martin Pasko	January 10, 1980	53415
Nearing his 534th birthday, Buck is feeling homesick for the 20th-Century and Wilma plans a surprise party to cheer him up. To lure Buck out of his apartment and allow Wilma to set up the party, Dr. Huer assigns him to escort a psychic courier named Raylyn Derren to New Detroit. At the city, an assassin named Cornell Traeger, who has a mutant power to alter molecular structures, plans to kill Dr. Huer as revenge for sending him on a disastrous mission 15 years ago. Traeger has since spent the time in prison on an alien planet and blames Huer for his suffering. Traeger abducts the courier to find out where Huer is, and Buck must stop him before he can carry out the killing. Guest stars: Morgan Brittany (as Raylyn Derren), Peter Mac Lean (as Cornell Traeger), Chip Johnson (as Carew), Bruce Wright (as Rorvik), Eric Mason (as Lieutenant Garth), Abraham Alvarez (as Security Agent), Tom Gagen (as Miles), Clay Alexander (as Marsden), and Tamara Dobson (as Dr. Delora Bayliss).
16	16	"A Blast for Buck"	David G. Phinney	T : Richard Nelson; S : John Gaynor	January 17, 1980	53420
A strange device materializes upon Dr. Huer's desk and presents a riddle for Buck. Unable to solve the peculiar puzzle, Dr. Huer believes that the device was sent by someone with a grudge against Buck so he scans Buck, Wilma and Twiki's memories to review many of the villains they have crossed paths with. Meanwhile, Dr. Theopolis tries to logically narrow down the culprit – or the prankster – responsible for the curious riddles. Note: This episode is a "clip show", composed mainly of footage from previous episodes. Guest star: Gary Coleman (as Hieronymus Fox).
17	17	"Ardala Returns"	Larry Stewart	Chris Bunch & Allan Cole	January 24, 1980	53419
After a pilot is killed testing a new Draconian "Hatchet Fighter" designed by Kane, Princess Ardala orders the program cancelled, but changes her mind when she comes up with an idea for a replacement pilot. Later, Buck investigates a derelict space capsule that appears to be from the 20th-Century, but once aboard he learns that it is a trap to capture him. Buck is taken aboard Ardala's flagship where she shows Buck a cloning lab where Kane has made an android copy of him called a Zygot. Kane then records Buck's combat experience with a special suit that directly records Buck's neural memory. He then implants the information into the android, and eventually the others he is making, that will ultimately pilot a wave of his new fighters against Earth. Buck tries to escape but finds Ardala has sent one of his clones to Earth as an imposter, rigged with a bomb capable of destroying New Chicago. Guest stars: Pamela Hensley (as Princess Ardala), H.B. Haggerty (as Tigerman), Michael Ansara (as Kane), and Betty A. Bridges (as Technician).
18	18	"Twiki Is Missing"	Sigmund Neufeld, Jr.	Jaron Summers	January 31, 1980	53422
After an uprising of miners on the asteroid Toros, the mining operator, Kerk Belzak, wishes to replace the human workers with robotic drones. Belzak sets his eyes on Twiki, the most advanced robot drone known, to use as a model to make copies. He sends his enforcers, the Omniguard, a trio of female paranormals with psychokinetic powers to buy Twiki from Buck, but Buck refuses to sell him. The ladies then resort to stealing the robot and Buck goes after them. Buck soon learns that Stella Breed, the leader of the Omniguard, is being forced to serve Belzak, who holds the life of her son in his hands. Meanwhile, Wilma guides a massive "spaceberg" composed of frozen oxygen into Earth's atmosphere in an attempt to replenish the planet's breathable air, but the berg is put in danger of exploding when it veers off course. Guest stars: John P. Ryan (as Kerk Belzak), Eddie Benton (as Stella Breed), Janet Bebe Louie (as Clare), and Eugenia Wright (as Dawn), David Darlow (as Pinchas), and Ken Letner (as Oto Anad).
19	19	"Olympiad"	Larry Stewart	Craig Buck	February 7, 1980	53421
Buck is invited to present the Earth's flag at the 2492 Olympic Games on the planet Mycos. There he meets an astrosled pilot named Lara Tizian who begs Buck to help her boyfriend Jorax Leet escape from the games. Jorax is from a repressive world called Lozeria and is trying to defect with Lara to Earth to escape being used as a political figurehead by the Lozerian hierarchy, but they have implanted a molecular bomb in his head which, if detonated, will not only kill him, but anyone around him. Lozeria's ruler is the Satrap, a dictator who ruthlessly controls athletes in much the same way that the Soviet Union and East Germany did during the Cold War. With Lara and Wilma's help, Buck tries to steal a remote detonator which is in the possession of Jorax's ruthless sponsor, Allerick. However, another problem arises when Dr. Theopolis warns a back-up detonation signal can be sent from the Lozerian home world and their only chance is to outrun the signal through the Stargate. Note: The romance between Lara Tizian and Jorax Leet is based on the romance between Czech Discus thrower Olga Fikotova and American Hammer thrower Hal Connolly during the 1956 Summer Olympic Games. The 1980 Summer Olympics were held in Moscow. When the show was aired, it had not been decided that the USA would boycott those games. Guest stars: Judith Chapman (as Lara Tizian), Barney MacFadden (as Jorax Leet), Nicolas Coster (as Allerick), Paul Mantee (as Karl), Paul Coufos (as Zagon), and John A. Zee (as the Satrap).
20	20	"A Dream of Jennifer"	David G. Phinney	Alan Brennert	February 14, 1980	53423
Buck sees a young woman who looks identical to his girlfriend Jennifer, whom he left behind when he was sent on his space mission in the 20th Century. The girl, whose name is Leila Markeson, catches a flight to "The City on the Sea", (what was once New Orleans), and Buck follows her there. However, Leila was molecularly altered to appear as Jennifer, and sent to lure Buck into a trap set by aliens known as the Koven. The Koven want Buck to attack a freighter that is transporting weapons to the colony on Vega V with whom they are at war. Buck refuses, but the alien leader, Reeve, threatens to kill Leila if he does not comply. Note: A connection to Star Trek is drawn by a P.A. call for captain Christopher Pike to report to the Veterans Affairs Office. Guest stars: Anne Lockhart (as Leila Markeson), Paul Koslo (as Commander Reeve), Gino Conforti (as Sylvie), Mary Woronov (as Nola), Jessie Lawrence Ferguson (as Lieutenant Rekoff), Cameron Young (as Toby Kaplan), Shawn Michaels (as Supervisor), Marsha Mercant (as Clerk), and Mitchel Evans (as the Mime). Dennis Haysbert appears as an airport security guard.
21	21	"Space Rockers"	Guy Magar	Chris Bunch & Allan Cole	February 21, 1980	53424
Buck learns that whenever the popular rock band "Andromeda" performs a show, the youth around the galaxy break out into violence. Suspecting a connection between the music and the riots, Buck decides to head to "Music World", a former military base turned broadcasting station, to meet the group. There he learns that the band's manager, Lars Mangros, is experimenting with energy patterns and human behavior and is somehow mixing mind-altering frequencies into his band's music. With Andromeda's biggest galaxy-wide concert just hours away from transmission, Buck tries to destroy Mangros' transmitter before the youth of the galaxy tear their worlds apart. Note: The funky song continuously played by the band is "Odyssey" by Johnny Harris who composed the track for the episode. Guest stars: Jerry Orbach (as Lars Mangros), Richard Moll (as Yarot), Nancy Frangione (as Karana), Leonard Lightfoot (as Cirus), Jesse D. Goins (as Rambeau), Jeff Harlan (as Mark), Cynthia Leake (as Elaine), Mitch Reta (as Technician), Joe Taggart (as Security Man), Paul LeClair (as Tarkus), and Judy Landers (as Joanna).
22	22	"Buck's Duel to the Death"	Bob Bender	Rob Gilmer	March 20, 1980	53425
Buck is invited to the planet Katar where he learns that he is to fulfill a prophecy that a 500-year-old man called the "Roshan" will lead an uprising against the "Trebor" – a ruthless warlord who oppresses the Katarian people. The Katarian leader, Prime Minister Darius, asks Buck to simply pose as the Roshan in hopes it will inspire his people to revolt, but not wanting a civil war, Buck instead decides to lead a mission to enter the Trebor's palace and eliminate him covertly. However, an informant tips off the tyrant and Buck's mission is foiled. The Trebor then challenges Buck to a duel to the death, but the dictator has the advantage of a cybernetic implant that allows him to throw deadly bolts of electricity. Note: "Trebor" spelled backwards is "Robert", which might refer to either writer or director. Guest stars: William Smith (as the Trebor), Keith Andes (as Darius), Elizabeth Stack (as Vionne), Edward Power (as Neil), Fred Sadoff (as Kelan), Robert Lussier (as Dr. Albert), Stephanie Blackmore (as Greta), Heidi Bohay (as Maya), Francisco Lagueruela (as Karem), and Douglas Bruce (as Young Officer).
23	23	"Flight of the War Witch"	Larry Stewart	T : Rob Gilmer & Bruce Lansbury; S : David Chomsky	March 27, 1980	53426
24	24	"Flight of the War Witch"	Larry Stewart	T : Rob Gilmer & Bruce Lansbury; S : David Chomsky	March 27, 1980	53426
A UFO lands outside New Chicago and presents a device for navigating an interdimensional vortex into another universe. Buck agrees to be the pilot to enter the vortex, but Princess Ardala steals the device and intends to follow him. Once through, Buck finds the planet Pendar, whose people tell of their conflict with the Zaads, an enemy race ruled by the War Witch Zarina. Lacking the means to wage war, the Pendarans ask Buck to fight their enemy for them. Meanwhile, the Draconians arrive, with Wilma and Dr. Huer against their wishes, but Ardala refuses to help the Pendarans. Buck also declines and the aliens withhold the means for returning to their universe leaving Buck and Ardala trapped with no other choice but to comply. Buck asks Ardala to join forces, but Ardala instead tries to befriend the evil Zaad leader Zarina. However, Ardala's plan backfires when Zarina thinks her a spoiled child, and Ardala is forced to work with Buck in combating the Zaad forces after all. Note: This was a two-hour episode, later syndicated as a two-part episode. The opening credits sequence of this episode differs from other first season episodes in that it incorporates footage from the TV version of the pilot film, as well as special effects footage that would not be used until the second season premiere, "Time of the Hawk". This episode also marks the last appearances of Dr. Huer, Dr. Theopolis, Princess Ardala, and Kane. Guest stars: Sam Jaffe (as the Keeper), Kelley Miles (as Chandar), Vera Miles (as Tora), Donald Petrie (as Kodus), Sid Haig (as Spirot), Brent Davis (as Goneril), Tony Carroll (as Pantherman), Larry Ward (as 1st Council Member), Gary Adler (as 1st Security Guard), Julie Newmar (as the War Witch Zarina). Pamela Hensley makes her final appearance as Ardala, as does Michael Ansara (as Kane).

=== Season 2 (1981) ===
No. overall	No. in season	Title	Directed by	Written by	Original release date	Prod. code
25	1	"Time of the Hawk"	Vincent McEveety	Norman Hudis	January 15, 1981	55902
26	2	"Time of the Hawk"	Vincent McEveety	Norman Hudis	January 15, 1981	55902
Buck Rogers, Wilma Deering and Twiki have been assigned aboard the spaceship Searcher which is on a mission to explore the galaxy and contact lost tribes of men who left Earth after the apocalyptic war. Elsewhere, a humanoid birdman named Hawk returns home and finds his people slaughtered by a band of human pirates and he angrily vows to kill all humans he encounters from then on. After Hawk attacks the crew of a freighter, Buck goes in search of him determined to put an end to his killing spree and bring him to justice. During his duel with Buck, Hawk's mate, Koori, is fatally injured and Buck helps Hawk get her to a healer. Although she dies, Hawk is impressed by the fact that Buck offered assistance to an enemy. Buck later defends Hawk at his trial and asks the human court for leniency. Having learned that not all humans are evil, Hawk joins the Searcher crew and accompanies Buck on many subsequent adventures. Note: This was a two-hour episode, later syndicated as a two-part episode. Bob Elyea takes over as the voice of Twiki. Guest stars: Introducing Thom Christopher (as Hawk), Barbara Luna (as Koori), Lance LeGault (as Flagg), David Opatoshu (as Llamajuna), Sid Haig (as Pratt), Kenneth O'Brien (as Captain), Dennis Haysbert (as Communication Officer), Lavelle Roby (as Thromis), Michael Fox (as High Judge), Andre Harvey (as Thordis).
27	3	"Journey to Oasis"	Daniel Haller	Robert & Esther Mitchell	January 22, 1981	55904
28	4	"Journey to Oasis"	Daniel Haller	Robert & Esther Mitchell	January 22, 1981	55904
While delivering a mysterious head-removing ambassador to peace talks at the neutral city of Oasis, Buck's shuttle encounters a magnetic storm and crashes. Buck and Hawk must then escort the ambassador to the city on foot, with Colonel Deering and Dr. Goodfellow in tow, but the way is dangerous and only the riddles of a mysterious, little, blue-skinned alien may be the key of reaching the city alive. Buck also battles his feelings for Wilma when he learns the ambassador was a former love interest of hers and his return rekindles her affections. Note: This was a two-hour episode, later syndicated as a two-part episode. Guest stars: Mark Lenard (as Ambassador Duvoe), Len Birman (as Admiral Zite), Paul Carr (as Lieutenant Devlin), Donn Whyte (as Zykarian Jr.), Felix Silla (as Odee-x), Michael Stroka (as Rolla) and Alex Hyde-White (as Technician).
29	5	"The Guardians"	Jack Arnold	Paul Schneider & Margaret Schneider	January 29, 1981	55915
Life aboard the Searcher is turned upside down when Buck brings aboard a mysterious jade box entrusted to him by a dying man he encounters on an unexplored planet. The seemingly cursed box takes over the ship and torments the lives of the crew by filling their minds with terrible visions. Conflicts arise when members of the crew try to destroy the box, but Buck stops them believing it is leading them to its new keeper – a being only known as "The Guardian" – and he must fulfill his promise to the dying man. Guest stars: Harry Townes (as The Guardian), Rosemary DeCamp (as Buck's Mother), Paul Carr (as Lieutenant Devin), Barbara Luna (as Koori), Shawn Stevens (as Boy), Dennis Haysbert (as Helmsmen), Vic Perrin (as 1st Guardian), Howard Culver (as Mailman).
30	6	"Mark of the Saurian"	Barry Crane	Francis Moss	February 5, 1981	55908
While suffering from an alien fever, Buck insists that a visiting ambassador and his entourage are really reptilian beings in human guise, but only he can see through their illusion. While everyone else thinks Buck is hallucinating, the aliens try to kill him, and Buck must prove what he sees is real before the aliens carry out their plot to infiltrate their enemy's defense station and destroy the Searcher. Guest stars: Linden Chiles (as Ambassador Cabot), Vernon Weddle (as Dr. Moray), Kim Hamilton (as Nurse Paulton), Stacy Keach Sr. (as Senior Officer), Barry Cahill (as Major Elif), Alan Hunt (as Wing Man), Frank Parker (as Captain).
31	7	"The Golden Man"	Vincent McEveety	Calvin Clements & Stephen McPherson	February 19, 1981	55913
After finding a lifepod containing a golden-skinned boy, the Searcher drifts into an asteroid field and becomes stuck against one of the rocks. The only way to free the ship may reside in the strange molecular-altering powers of the boy's companion, the "Golden Man", who is being held captive on a nearby planet inhabited by a penal colony. Once the criminals learn of the alien's powers, they force him to repair a makeshift spacecraft so they can escape. Buck and the golden boy must rescue the golden man from his captors before the Searcher is destroyed. Guest stars: Paul Carr (as Lieutenant Devlin), David Hollander (as Velis), Russell Wiggins (as Relcos), Anthony James (as Mr. Graf), Bruce M. Fischer (as Loran), Diana Chesney (as Hag), Roger Rose (as Marcos).
32	8	"The Crystals"	John Patterson	Robert & Esther Mitchell	March 5, 1981	55916
While exploring the planet Philoctetes for power crystals, Buck, Hawk and Wilma find the remains of a mummy, but unbeknown to them, the body comes to life and steals their crystals. While searching for the creature, Buck encounters a young girl with no memory of who she is or where she came from. After running a medical scan, Wilma learns that the girl has a genetic connection to the creature which begins stalking her. Fearful she will become a monster herself, Buck must help the girl find her true identity before the creature strikes again. Note: Mel Blanc returns as the voice of Twiki. Guest stars: Amanda Wyss (as Laura), Sandy Champion (as Chief Hall), Alex Hyde-White (as Lieutenant Martin), James R. Parkes (as Kovick), Gary Bolen (as Johnson), Leigh C. Kim (as Petrie), and Hubie Kerns Jr. (as Mummy Monster).
33	9	"The Satyr"	Victor French	Paul Schneider & Margaret Schneider	March 12, 1981	55907
While exploring the planet Arcadis for a lost human colony, Buck finds a boy and his mother, the last remaining colonists, and soon learns the family is being tormented by a satyr-like being. When Buck confronts the creature, he is bitten and soon begins transforming into a Satyr himself. After learning a strange affliction had turned all the men of the colony into the creatures, Buck tries to fight the transformation and helps the family escape the planet. Note: Bruce Broughton won an Outstanding Achievement in Music Composition for a Series (Dramatic Underscore) Emmy Award for his music in this episode, the show's only Emmy win. Guest stars: Anne E. Curry (as Cyra Samos), David S. Cass Sr. (as Major Jason Samos/Pangor), Bobby Lane (as Delph) and Dennis Freeman (as Midshipman).
34	10	"Shgoratchx!"	Vincent McEveety	William Keys	March 19, 1981	55901
The Searcher finds a derelict Zardonian bomb disposal ship crewed by seven mischievous little men. Buck offers to help them finish their disposal mission, but the curious dwarves begin to wreak havoc aboard the Searcher and severely damage Crichton's positronic brain. With the ship out of control and heading toward a star, Twiki offers his own electronic brain to repair Crichton so he can initiate repairs to the ship. Once the dwarves realize the trouble they have caused, they offer to repair Crichton's brain with their telekinetic mental powers. Guest stars: Tommy Madden (as General Xenos), Alex Hyde-White (as Ensign Moore), John Edward Allen (as General Zoman), Tony Cox (as Private Zedht), Billy Curtis (as General Voomak), Harry Monty (as General Sothoz), Spencer Russell (as General Towtuk), Charles Secor (as General Kuzan).
35	11	"The Hand of The Goral"	David G. Phinney	Francis Moss	March 26, 1981	55914
Buck, Hawk and Wilma rescue a downed pilot from a strange planet called Vordeeth. When they return to the Searcher, they find the crew's attitudes have changed – Admiral Asimov is paranoid of mutiny, Crichton acts nicely, and Twiki is belligerent. Buck also notices small physical differences to the layout of his quarters, and he can only suspect the ship, and everyone aboard it, is an imperfect duplicate. Meanwhile, the real Searcher is caught in a trap set by a powerful being from the planet below who offers Buck wealth and power in exchange for the lives of the Searcher crew. Guest stars: John Fujioka (as Hand of Goral), Willam Bryant (as Cowan), Peter Kastner (as Reardon), Dennis Haysbert (as Lieutenant Parsons), Michael Horsley (as Yeoman James).
36	12	"Testimony of a Traitor"	Bernard McEveety	Stephen McPherson	April 9, 1981	55917
When the Searcher returns to Earth, Buck is immediately arrested on charges of high treason. He stands trial while his peers review a 500-year-old piece of evidence – a videotape from the 20th-Century unearthed from the ruins of an Air Force Base – which shows Buck working with treasonous military personnel who brought about World War III. Facing the death penalty, Buck must prove his innocence, but he has no memory of his involvement with any of the events. He then resorts to using Dr. Goodfellow's repressed memory probe, (which shows among other things, Rogers' meeting with the President of the United States in a secret base inside Mount Rushmore), in hopes of finding the truth of what really happened before a final verdict is rendered. Guest stars: Ramon Bieri (as Commissioner Bergstrom), William Sylvester (as Lt. Gen. Preston Myers), David Hooks (as General Arnheim), Walter Brooke (as U.S. President), John Milford (as Air Force General), John O'Connell (as Major Peterson), Thomas Bellin (as Crawford), Buck Young (as Brigadier Gen. Biles), Carl Reindel (as Air Force Sergeant).
37	13	"The Dorian Secret"	Jack Arnold	Stephen McPherson	April 16, 1981	55906
Buck helps a young woman named Asteria escape from a group of masked men on a space station. He brings her to the Searcher, but soon the ship comes under attack by a Dorian warship whose masked leader, Koldar, demands the woman be brought to him. Buck initially refuses handing her over and the Dorians respond by randomly firing heat and freeze rays at the Searcher forcing the crew to endure continuously changing temperatures. Koldar finally reveals that Asteria is wanted for murder, but Buck does not believe the accusation and instead tries to learn a secret she is hiding. Meanwhile, the suffering passengers on the Searcher demand that Buck surrender the woman before they take drastic action themselves. Guest stars: Devon Ericson (as Asteria Eleefa), Denny Miller (as Saurus), William Kirby Cullen (as Demeter), Walker Edmiston (as Koldar), Michele Marsh (as Cleis), Dennis Haysbert (as Ensign), Stuart Nisbet (as Rand), Eldon Quick (as Chronos).
