= The A-Team season 3 =

The A-Team
- Season 3
- Original season 3 DVD cover
- No. of episodes: 25

Release
- Original network: NBC
- Original release: September 18, 1984 – May 14, 1985

Season chronology
- ← Previous; Season 2 Next → Season 4

The third season of the action-adventure television series The A-Team premiered in the United States on NBC on September 18, 1984, and concluded on May 14, 1985, consisting of 25 episodes.

== Cast ==
- George Peppard as Lieutenant Colonel/Colonel John "Hannibal" Smith
- Dirk Benedict as First Lieutenant Templeton "Faceman" Peck
- Dwight Schultz as Captain H. M. Murdock
- Mr. T as Sergeant First Class Bosco Albert "B. A." (Bad Attitude) Baracus

== Episodes ==
No. overall	No. in season	Title	Directed by	Written by	Original release date
38	1	"Bullets and Bikinis"	Dennis Donnelly	Mark Jones	September 18, 1984
Flying to Miami to help two girls in their hotel business, the A-Team must deal with two problems: B.A.'s fear of flying, and the gangsters that are trying to force the girls to sell the hotel. The method of getting B.A. to fly this time is drugging him in a car and making him think they drove the entire time to get there; even doctoring a newspaper to fake the passage of time. Hannibal takes over as the hotel's owner, while Face plans to reorganize the staff by hiring attractive women in bikinis to bring in more guests. In the end, B.A. discovers the ruse after seeing a real newspaper.
39	2	"The Bend in the River"	Michael O'Herlihy	Stephen J. Cannell & Frank Lupo	September 25, 1984
40	3	"The Bend in the River"	Michael O'Herlihy	Stephen J. Cannell & Frank Lupo	September 25, 1984
Tawnia Baker, the A-Team's support member for the last half season calls in the help of her friends to find an archaeologist (secretly her fiancé) that has gone missing during an Amazon expedition. Traveling to the Amazon, the A-Team must deal with the local pirate king, "El Cajon" (The Coffin). The A-Team have to find a way to locate the pirates, bringing them into unknown territory. Locating the pirates, they come across a plot that is far greater than any of them could have expected: Third Reich remnants building a nuclear station. As Murdock puts it "the Fuhrer the better." The A-Team must ally themselves with the shady El Cajon's forces to defeat the threat. This is the last appearance of Tawnia Baker, who weds her fiancé at the end of the episode.: Note: Originally shown as a feature-length episode, which was later cut into two separate episodes for syndication.; Special Guest Star: Barry Van Dyke as Brian Lefcourt
41	4	"Fire"	Tony Mordente	Stephen Katz	October 2, 1984
A fire chief calls in the help of the A-Team to help defend her department from a competing fire fighting department. Meanwhile, Colonel Decker is temporally replaced by a Colonel named Briggs, who opens his hunt on the A-Team, only to be unsuccessful in his first and only attempt.: Note: Colonel Decker would makes his reappearance later in the series with no explanation as to the disappearance of Briggs. Although the most likely reason is that unlike Lynch or Decker, Briggs lacked the willpower to continue his pursuit of the A-Team after his first failed attempt.; Trivia: The alert tones in the first minute of the show, as well as the siren used by the fire truck, come from another NBC show, Emergency! (1972) Special Guest Star: Stepfanie Kramer as Fire Chief Annie Sanders.
42	5	"Timber!"	David Hemmings	Jeff Ray	October 16, 1984
A brother and sister hire the A-Team to help them stay in the logging business. Murdock obsesses over a magazine contest to photograph Bigfoot, an impressive defense is mounted whilst cornered in a lumberyard, with no firearms at hand the A-team improvises one of their best creations yet; the armored forklift cannon, with ammunition that's sure to stump the enemy.
43	6	"Double Heat"	Craig R. Baxley	Stephen Katz	October 23, 1984
The A-Team is hired to find the kidnapped daughter of a man who has to testify against the biggest mobster in the city, and they find out the abduction is part of a burgeoning war between two rival syndicates. Special Guest Stars:Dana Elcar as George Olson. Burke Byrnes as Federal Marshal. Steven Williams as Eddie Devane.
44	7	"Trouble on Wheels"	Michael O'Herlihy	Mark Jones	October 30, 1984
The A-Team is called in to thwart a stolen auto-parts scam operated by a violent group of criminals. Special Guest Star: Joe Santos as Rudy Garcia.
45	8	"The Island"	Michael O'Herlihy	Mark Jones	November 13, 1984
A young boy from a remote tropical island asks the A-Team to help his people who are being terrorized by a group of fiendish drug smugglers. Among the islanders is the A-Team's old Vietnam-era medic, Dr. Fallone. This is also the first time someone guesses Hannibal is in disguise, but it isn't him. Trivia: The stock airplane footage that was used when The A-Team travel to the island are clips of the Cutter's Goose from Tales of the Gold Monkey, which was a Universal-produced TV show that aired during the 1982-83 season.
46	9	"Showdown!"	James Fargo	Milt Rosen	November 20, 1984
Several unsavory hoodlums are hired by the sleazy rock promoter Kyle Mason to impersonate the A-Team and tries to force Captain Winnetka's Wild West Show out of business. The real A-Team arrives to help the Captain and his feisty daughter Carrie, and to clear their names. The A-Team must save the Wild West Show while trying to evade their old nemesis Colonel Lynch, who has been given one final chance to capture the A-Team and is determined to succeed at all costs. At the same time Murdock is upset because the phoney A-Team doesn't have an imposter of himself; however, Hannibal calms him by explaining Murdock is a "known unknown". Special Guest Star: Morgan Woodward as Captain Winnetka.
47	10	"Sheriffs of Rivertown"	Dennis Donnelly	Mark Jones	November 27, 1984
A group of businessmen have banded together to solve a very serious law and order problem, and conclude it is just the kind of job for the A-Team.
48	11	"The Bells of St. Mary's"	Dennis Donnelly	Stephen J. Cannell	December 4, 1984
The A-Team are caught between a greedy record company owner, a top singing group (the Bells) and a school's top football player. Serving as a makeshift witness protection group, while resisting their own attraction to the girls, the team successfully keep them safe until the charity concert. Special Guest Star: Joseph Wiseman as Zeke Westerland.
49	12	"Hot Styles"	Tony Mordente	Stephen Katz	December 11, 1984
Just when Templeton 'Face' Peck is getting smitten with the Hollywood model Rina Turian, she is snatched before his nose by Chicago based mobster Johnny Turian. Note: B.A. is only seen at the end. Special Guest Stars: Richard Lynch as Johnny Turian and Markie Post as Rina Turian.
50	13	"Breakout!"	Dennis Donnelly	Stephen Katz & Mark Jones	December 18, 1984
While B.A. drives to Hollywood, where Face is having a ball, Murdock's rabbit's foot doesn't prevent himself from being kidnapped and the black van from getting hijacked by bank-robber Deke Logan and his partner Malcolm. Note: Face is only briefly seen at the beginning.
51	14	"Cup A' Joe"	Craig R. Baxley	Dennis O'Keefe III	January 8, 1985
When the Ruthless business magnate Cactus Jack Slater (John Ashton) threatens a defenseless family for their diner, the A-team are called to not only put him in his place, but for Murdock to show off his cooking skills as well.
52	15	"The Big Squeeze"	Arnold Laven	Stephen J. Cannell	January 15, 1985
When loan shark Jack 'the Ripper' Lane, who is too violent even for his mob extortion boss Nathan Vincent's taste, breaks Italian restaurant owner Gino Giani's fingers, he and his daughter Gina hire the A-Team.
53	16	"Champ!"	Michael O'Herlihy	Stephen Katz	January 22, 1985
Face decides to invest some of the team's funds in 60% of a boxer, Billy Marquette. Special Guest Star: Alex Rocco as Sonny Monroe.
54	17	"Skins"	Dennis Donnelly	Mark Jones	January 29, 1985
The A-Team travels to Kenya to help a game warden fight an organized unit illegally hunting elephants for skins and ivory tusks as well as the slaying of her brother.
55	18	"Road Games"	Dennis Donnelly	Mark Jones	February 5, 1985
When the otherwise decent manager of a foster home is forced to take a run on account of his personal debts in illegal gambling, the A-Team is hired to put the criminals out of business, and must even trick Colonel Decker into providing help.
56	19	"Moving Targets"	Dennis Donnelly	Mark Jones	February 12, 1985
The A-Team is hired to test the security in the royal palace of a Northwest African country. Trivia: When moving inside the ship, the word "BILLETTKONTOR" is written on one of the curved walls, suggesting that the ship is Norwegian. Special Guest Star: John Saxon as Kalem.
57	20	"Knights of the Road"	Michael O'Herlihy	Burt Pearl & Steven L. Sears	February 26, 1985
Mr. Corson and his daughter Jenny run a small towing truck company in an Arizonan town. When another company resorts to violence against their trucks and even threaten them physically to force them out of business, the A-Team is recruited.
58	21	"Waste 'Em!"	Sidney Hayers	Stephen Katz & Mark Jones	March 5, 1985
Former military helicopter pilot A.J. runs a delivery service, Speedy Express, with his blind sister Lisa Perry. Garbage collection company manager Ike Hagen wants them to sell to him, and pulls all the stops to force them, including threats and violence against both vehicles and staff, so they hire the A-Team. Special guest star: Mitchell Ryan as Ike Hagan
59	22	"Bounty"	Michael O'Herlihy	Mark Jones & Stephen Katz	April 2, 1985
Romance blossoms between Murdock and Kelly Stevens, a veterinarian, after she rescues the pilot from savage bounty hunters. NOTE: Dwight Schultz's real-life wife Wendy Fulton plays Kelly, and the episode plays off their real-life marriage.
60	23	"Beverly Hills Assault"	Craig R. Baxley	Paul Birnbaum	April 9, 1985
A young artist seeks the help of the A-Team to search for the men who brutally assaulted her boyfriend. Also, Murdock takes up painting and Face becomes a critic to bust a party of art thieves in Beverly Hills. Special Guest Star: Lloyd Bochner as Steffan Shawn.
61	24	"Trouble Brewing"	Michael O'Herlihy	Burt Pearl & Steven L. Sears	May 7, 1985
Two sisters who own a soda factory are victimized by a competitor and seek help from the A-Team.
62	25	"Incident at Crystal Lake"	Tony Mordente	Stephen J. Cannell & Frank Lupo	May 14, 1985
The A-Team take a vacation at Crystal Lake after Colonel Decker gets too close for comfort. However, their holiday is ruined when four fleeing robbers take Crystal Lake's ranger and his daughter hostage.
