= Deadly Maneuvers =

Deadly Maneuvers may refer to:

- "Deadly Maneuvers" (The A-Team)
- "Deadly Maneuvers" (Knight Rider)
