= The Sten Chronicles =

Military science fiction novel series by Chris Bunch and Allan Cole

The Sten Chronicles, also called The Sten Adventures, are a series of eight military science fiction and space opera novels by Chris Bunch and Allan Cole published from 1982 to 1993 (with several more novels published by Cole in 2010s). The series was originally published by Del Rey and then re-released by Orbit.

== Plot overview ==
The books follow Karl Sten, a young man born and raised on the dangerous factory world of Vulcan and saved from life as an outlaw by the head of Imperial Intelligence, Ian Mahoney. Mahoney takes Sten from the terrible world of his birth and enlists him in the military. Sten is thrust into a world of espionage, covert military actions, and galactic politics. His original training is in the super-secret covert ops group known as Mantis. The missions and actions taken are usually known only to a select few. A series of crucial missions ensures that Sten rises swiftly in rank until he becomes a troubleshooter and friend to the Emperor himself.

The series of eight books are set three thousand years in the future. A vast empire, limited only by the galaxy itself, is ruled by the Eternal Emperor, a man who appears to be in his thirties but is in fact over three thousand years old. He has mastered death in a way no one has guessed since the beginning of his rule. The source of his power is a powerful fuel called Anti-Matter Two (AM2). It is what fuels everything from the star ships that link the Empire, to industrial factories, to camping heaters. Only he controls its supply and price. And only he knows where to find it. It is only for this reason that he is able to rule.

== Books ==
The main series is composed of eight volumes:

1. Sten (1982)—Sten joins a special ops team and causes the downfall of Vulcan
2. The Wolf Worlds (1984)—Sten's team overthrows a corrupt government
3. The Court of a Thousand Suns (1985)—Bodyguard Captain Sten foils a murder plot against the Emperor
4. Fleet of the Damned (1988)—Commander Sten fights the Tahn from space
5. Revenge of the Damned (1989)—POW Sten brings about the Tahn's downfall
6. The Return of the Emperor (1990)—Sten overthrows the Privy Council
7. Vortex (1992)—Ambassador Sten tries to bring peace to a planet
8. Empire's End (1993)—Rebel Sten defeats the Eternal Emperor

The books have been collected in three volumes titled The Sten Omnibus #1 Battlecry (2010), The Sten Omnibus #2 Juggernaut (2012) and The Sten Omnibus #3 Death Match (2012), collecting books 1–3, 4–6 and 7–8 respectively.

Following Chris Bunch's death in 2005, Allan Cole wrote three more books: a cookbook titled The Sten Cookbook (2013) and two novels—Sten and the Mutineers (2016) and Sten and the Pirate Queen (2018—set between the second and third books in the original series).

== Themes ==
At the end of the last book of the series, there is a short epilogue, in which the authors state that they view the series as one novel in eight parts. They also explain, that they wrote the book as a response to the trend of other science fiction authors to pick monarchy as the future form of government in their books. To make the point that monarchy is not a viable form of government, they chose to write about a working-class hero, and incorporated the theme of "power corrupts". The epilogue also states that the series counts a little over one million words.

== Reception ==
Reviewing the series for tor.com in 2019, Alan Brown wrote that it is "one of my favorites from that era, and stands as a fine example of the space opera subgenre. With lots of action and adventure, interesting characters, and a little humor thrown in here and there, it is a quick and enjoyable read. Re-reading it for this review, I found that it held up very well in the three decades or so since it was written. If you’re looking for a series that won’t run out before you get to the thrilling conclusion, The Sten Chronicles has my highest recommendation".
