= Werewolf (TV series) =

- Genre: Horror; Thriller
- Created by: Frank Lupo
- Written by: Tom Blomquist; Frank Lupo
- Directed by: James Darren
- Starring: John J. York; Lance LeGault; Chuck Connors
- Composer: Sylvester Levay
- Country of origin: United States
- Original language: English
- No. of seasons: 2
- No. of episodes: 29

Production
- Executive producers: John Ashley; Frank Lupo
- Producer: Bernadette Joyce
- Editor: Howard Deane
- Running time: 24 min
- Production companies: Tri-Star Television (1987–1988); Columbia Pictures Television (1988)

Original release
- Network: Fox
- Release: July 11, 1987 – May 22, 1988

Werewolf is an American horror television series, and one of the original shows in the Fox network's broadcast line-up during its inaugural season of 1987–1988.

The show follows the adventures of Eric Cord (John J. York), a college student transformed into a werewolf who undergoes a quest to rid himself of his curse by killing the apparent originator of his "bloodline," a drifter named Janos Skorzeny (the character's name is a reference to the name of the vampire in the classic TV film The Night Stalker) played by Chuck Connors (in his last television role). While pursuing Skorzeny, Cord himself is pursued by the persistent bounty hunter "Alamo" Joe Rogan (Lance LeGault). Later, Cord hunts Nicholas Remy (Brian Thompson), the real originator of the bloodline.

The show aired a two-hour pilot and 28 half-hour episodes before being canceled in 1988. In the United Kingdom, the series aired on Sky One from 1989 to 1990.

== Synopsis ==
Eric Cord is a college student whose average life comes to an end on the night that his roommate, Ted, hands him a gun loaded with silver bullets. Ted is a werewolf who has been killing people and tells Eric to kill him, seeing this as his only way out. A red pentagram on Ted's right palm is the sign that the metamorphosis is coming. Confronted with Eric's disbelief, Ted decides to prove his situation and asks Eric to tie him up in a chair and wait until midnight, at which time he'd either see for himself or call in professional help. When midnight comes, Ted transforms into a werewolf, forcing his friend to shoot and kill him — but not before he manages to bite Eric. Before long, Eric discovers a pentagram on his own palm and, soon after, undergoes his own transformation into a seven-foot-tall werewolf. Now on the run for his friend's murder, Eric spends the remainder of the series on a quest to find and kill the originator of his bloodline, the mysterious Janos Skorzeny, which will break the curse.

The series was similar in tone and formula to shows like The Fugitive and The Incredible Hulk but achieved a contemporary feel by mixing a decidedly rock soundtrack with suspense-themed music. Eric wandered from place to place, hitchhiking, taking odd jobs and befriending various characters whose paths he crossed along the way, before invariably being transformed by his werewolf curse just in time to save his new friends from the clutches of some evildoer. Though Eric appeared to have no control over his actions while in werewolf form and typically retained no memory of them afterward, he seemed to prey almost exclusively on villainous characters, never attacking or killing an innocent person. There were hints as the series progressed, however, that this self-control was slowly eroding, as indeed Ted had warned him it would, threatening to destroy Eric's conscience/will if he could not end the curse soon.

Near the end of the series' run, it was revealed that the originator of Eric's bloodline was not, in fact, the evil Janos Skorzeny but rather an even more powerful and malevolent werewolf named Nicholas Remy (played by Brian Thompson). The series ended before Eric could be rid of his curse.

The special effects techniques used in production were considered first-rate and impressive for the time, specifically the transformation sequences, in which, for example, the pentagram-shaped scar on Eric's right hand would rise, thicken and grow three-dimensionally, and begin to bleed.

=== Replacement of Skorzeny ===
According to script editor Allan Cole, after the series had started production, Chuck Connors wanted to renegotiate his contract for more money. Various episodes written to feature Skorzeny were shot without Connors — using only scenes with Skorzeny in his werewolf form plus a human body double with no dialogue. Series creator Frank Lupo asked Cole and Chris Bunch to kill off Skorzeny in "To Dream of Wolves." Connors agreed to return for his finale, according to Cole. The script was originally written as a three-parter with Connors in the first two parts, but two days before shooting, Cole and Bunch were informed that Connors would not take part. The first two episodes were collapsed into one, all of Skorzeny's new dialogue was cut (aside from flashback scenes of young Skorzeny played by a different actor) and Skorzeny's part was rewritten to show him cravenly (and silently) kneeling before Remy. In the final fight between Eric and Skorzeny, Eric scarred his foe with acid and then electrocuted him — allowing Connors' human-form body double to play the death scene in disfiguring makeup.

== Production ==
Fox Broadcasting Company announced it picked up to series at Fox in February of 1987.

Parts of the series were shot in Salt Lake City, Utah.

It was co-produced by John Ashley.

== Characteristics ==
=== Traits ===
The werewolves in the show were immune to the effects of aging or disease, with the exception of Skorzeny himself. Although Skorzeny was apparently a young man, as shown in a flashback scene when he was bitten by Nicolas Remy in the 19th century, he appeared to be in his mid-sixties in 1987. Nicolas Remy explained to Eric that Skorzeny was slowly dying from a "sickness brought about by his own evil," that was decaying him from within. Nicolas Remy himself was over two thousand years old; yet, he appeared to be a man in his late thirties with the exception of a streak of gray hair near his right temple.

The werewolves in the series were apparently vulnerable to harm in their human forms from ordinary weapons but with no permanent effects. In an episode titled "A World of Difference", Eric is shot dead in human form (he was just beginning to undergo the metamorphosis), only to resurrect in the morgue by transforming into his werewolf form at sunset. In another episode titled "Nightmare at the Braine Hotel", Eric meets a werewolf named Servan, who tells him a story in which he had been executed by hanging in his human form. He seemed greatly amused by the memory of the looks on his executioners' faces as he leapt off the undertaker's table when he transformed at sunset and rose from death. Another werewolf character, a hobo named Hank who was featured in the episode "King of the Road", dies in his human form from having his throat cut, only to resurrect in his werewolf form as soon as night falls. This ability is reminiscent of the "Eddie Quist" character in The Howling, who is shot dead by police during the beginning of his transformation at the adult movie theater, only to come to life later by transforming in the morgue.

The werewolves themselves transformed into large, almost bearlike bipedal wolves with long simian arms that allowed them to run on all fours, as well as two. All the werewolves transformed by sprouting fangs, claws and fur, except for Skorzeny, who peeled back the skin of his face to reveal the werewolf form within. In their human forms, they had no traditionally distinguishing marks, such as eyebrows meeting over the bridge of their nose or hair on the palms of their hands. It was also never explored as to whether or not werewolves could reproduce sexually in their human bodies.

Although the werewolves did completely recover from wounds made by non-silver weapons, the series never explored whether or not werewolves could regenerate missing limbs. Skorzeny, who wore an eye patch over his left eye, did seem to regenerate his missing eye when he transformed into his werewolf form. But when he returned to his human form, he once again wore the eye patch. It was explained that Remy is the one who cut out his eye in the episode "To Dream of Wolves."

Werewolves in this series did not transform during the full moon; the pentagram on their palm was the only signal that the metamorphosis was approaching. In the pilot, Eric's roommate, Ted, stated that its appearance was very random, and that he had not discerned any pattern to when or how often the metamorphosis would occur. Older werewolves like Skorzeny and Remy had the ability to induce the metamorphosis without the appearance of the pentagram, unlike Eric, who seemed to be at the mercy of the curse's cycle. In the episode "To Dream of Wolves", Remy also showed an ability to shapeshift single body parts at will, as shown when he shapeshifted his right arm into its werewolf shape to kill Dianne for disobeying his order to kill Eric. Remy also seemed to have a form of psychic control over those of his bloodline: In "To Dream of Wolves", he toys with Eric by telepathically forcing him to press a silver dagger to his own throat, drawing blood.

=== Shapeshifting into a werewolf ===
While the bite of a werewolf was the standard way to pass the curse to another person, blood transfusion appeared to be effective in the episode titled "Big Daddy." No mystical talismans, salves or hexes seemed to have any place in the series. It was also never suggested that the curse was hereditary.

=== Vulnerabilities ===
The werewolves had only three known weaknesses mentioned in the series: any weapon made from silver, being killed by another werewolf or suicide.

=== Bloodlines ===
Eric is told of other bloodlines by Gray Wolf in the episode of the same name. It is unknown if it is a complete list or just the bloodlines that he knew of.

- Nicholas Remy
- Janos Skorzeny
- Ted Nichols
- Eric Cord
- Yuzora
- Gray Wolf
- Blackfoot
- Blackwolf
- Mather
- Pilatzi
- Mendez
- Kadar
- Howard

== Episodes ==
=== Season 1 (1987) ===
No. in season	Title	Directed by	Written by	Original release date
1	"Werewolf"	David Hemmings	Frank Lupo	July 11, 1987
Pilot: Eric is attacked by his best friend (Raphael Sbarge), who is a werewolf. Now afflicted with the curse, Eric must track down the originator of his bloodline in order to rid himself of his new alter ego while also avoiding the bounty hunter who's been sent after him.
2	"Nightwatch"	David Hemmings	Frank Lupo	July 18, 1987
After trailing Skorzeny to a shipyard, Eric is set upon by a pair of seamen looking to collect the bounty on his head. Guest stars: Denny Miller, Henry Beckman, Grand L. Bush.
3	"The Boy Who Cried Werewolf"	Larry Shaw	Mark Jones	July 25, 1987
Injured by Rogan, Eric seeks shelter in a young boy's treehouse and soon runs afoul of his mother's abusive boyfriend. Guest stars: Cyril O'Reilly, Anne Wyndham, Danny Cooksey.
4	"The Black Ship"	James Darren	Chris Bunch, Allan Cole	August 1, 1987
Eric is captured by an old friend of Skorzeny's and must find a way to escape before Skorzeny comes for him. Guest star: Stefan Gierasch.
5	"Spectre of the Wolf"	Lyndon Chubbuck	Craig Tepper	August 8, 1987
Eric consults Dr. DeGoethels (Byrne Piven), a well-known author and professor of werewolf lore, for help in finding a cure.
6	"The Wolf Who Thought He Was a Man"	David Hemmings	Chris Bunch, Allan Cole	August 15, 1987
While on the road, Eric meets up with a hunter who takes the phrase "hunt like a wolf" a little too far.
7	"Nothing Evil in These Woods"	David Hemmings	Sidney Ellis	August 29, 1987
Lost in the woods, Eric happens upon a local witch who claims she has the power to rid him of his curse.
8	"Running with the Pack"	Guy Magar	Craig Tepper	September 12, 1987
Working at a small diner to make ends meet, Eric gets more than he bargained for when a cutthroat motorcycle gang rides into town.

=== Season 2 (1987-88) ===
No. in season	Title	Directed by	Written by	Original release date
1	"Friendly Haven"	David Hemmings	Tom Blomquist	September 26, 1987
Eric takes refuge at the home of an old woman while being chased by Skorzeny.
2	"Let Us Prey"	James Darren	Chris Bunch, Allan Cole	October 3, 1987
Chasing reports of a wild cougar, Eric takes refuge at a monastery where he soon learns that some of the staff prey in a different way at night.
3	"A World of Difference: Part 1"	James Darren	Craig Tepper	October 10, 1987
Rogan finds Eric locked up in a small town, but when his captive changes into a werewolf and escapes, the bounty hunter finds he's no match for the hunting skills of the wolf.
4	"A World of Difference: Part 2"	James Darren	Craig Tepper	October 17, 1987
In the hospital recovering from a werewolf attack, Rogan reflects on how to deal with his dilemma. Things get sidetracked in a hurry when he learns that Eric isn't dead after all.
5	"The Unicorn"	Lyndon Chubbuck	Mark Jones	October 25, 1987
Eric is kidnapped by a pimp when he saves one of his charges from a brutal beating. Meanwhile, Rogan is hot on Eric's trail, not realizing he's actually closer to finding Skorzeny.
6	"All Hallow's Eve"	Larry Shaw	Craig Tepper	October 31, 1987
Eric holes up in an abandoned house on Halloween night in order to lock himself up before the change, not realizing that the house isn't actually abandoned.
7	"Blood on the Tracks"	Rob Bowman	Christian Darren	November 1, 1987
Eric gets a job working the railroads and runs into one of his childhood heroes, a former heavyweight champion with some demons of his own. Guest starring Everett McGill.
8	"Nightmare at the Braine Hotel"	David Hemmings	Craig Tepper	November 8, 1987
A slasher, a sinister hotel manager, and an ancient werewolf whose curse invades the dreams of those around him. How much "only" is there in "only a dream"? Guest starring Richard Lynch.
9	"Wolfhunt"	Bob Bralver	Chris Bunch, Allan Cole	November 15, 1987
Eric and a wolf form a bond of friendship out in the wild, but a rancher is out to hunt them both down with silver bullets, thanks to a visit from Rogan.
10	"Blood Ties"	David Hemmings	Christian Darren	November 22, 1987
Working as a groundskeeper at a high-class residence, Eric must clear his name when he is framed for murder.
11	"Big Daddy"	Larry Shaw	Chris Bunch, Allan Cole	November 29, 1987
Forcefully taken by a state trooper to Big Daddy Frasier's home, Eric learns that Big Daddy (Howard Duff) has an idea of what Eric can do to help cure his cancer.
12	"Eye of the Storm"	Sidney Hayers	Tom Blomquist	December 6, 1987
Eric finds himself in the middle of a murder mystery at the Simms Lodge. He convinces the other lodgers to work together in order to find the culprit, but his plans change when he is about to.
13	"Nightmare in Blue"	David Hemmings	Chris Bunch, Allan Cole	January 17, 1988
The long arm of the law finds Eric when he is at his most vulnerable. To make matters worse, Rogan's reach is even closer. Guest starring Gregg Henry.
14	"Skinwalker"	Rob Bowman	Christian Darren	January 24, 1988
Eric learns that the Native American legend of the Skinwalker is true and that it's up to him to stop the bloodshed.
15	"King of the Road"	Richard A. Colla	Chris Bunch, Allan Cole	February 7, 1988
Hopping a train, Eric runs afoul of a group of homeless travelers trying to escape a "ripper" who's been preying on vagrants in their hometown. Guest starring Sid Haig.
16	"A Material Girl"	James Darren	Chris Bunch, Allan Cole	February 14, 1988
Eric chases Skorzeny into a mall after business hours. He meets a girl who lives there and learns he wasn't chasing Skorzeny all along.
17	"To Dream of Wolves: Part 1"	James Darren	Chris Bunch, Allan Cole	February 21, 1988
Eric finally tracks down Skorzeny but learns that, contrary to what he was told, his old nemesis is not the originator of their bloodline.
18	"To Dream of Wolves: Part 2"	James Darren	Chris Bunch, Allan Cole	February 28, 1988
Eric breaks into the home of Nicolas Remy and learns that Remy is the one he must destroy in order to rid himself of his curse.
19	"Blind Luck"	Jon Paré	Dennis Foley	March 6, 1988
Working at a carnival, Eric runs afoul of a schemer who's taking advantage of blind women.
20	"Gray Wolf"	James Darren	Norman Spinrad	March 13, 1988
While being chased by Rogan, Eric meets an old werewolf from another bloodline (W. Morgan Sheppard). Together they can defeat Remy, but only if Eric can keep the man on his side. Also starring Larry Drake.
21	"Amazing Grace"	Richard A. Colla	Chris Bunch, Allan Cole	May 22, 1988
An old lady who loves to tell stories (Billie Bird) tries to save Eric from two thugs. Soon she is placed in a mental institution, and Eric tries to break her out.

== In other media ==
In July 1988, Blackthorne Publishing released a five-issue comic book series based on the show.

== Syndication ==
From 2007 to 2009, Chiller aired reruns of Werewolf. Chiller premiered the series with a marathon on June 6, 2007.

== Home media ==
The two-hour pilot was released in the UK in PAL VHS format by Entertainment in Video.

Werewolf: The Complete Series was to be released on DVD by Shout! Factory by October 6, 2009, but was later pushed back two weeks to October 20, 2009, to include special features. The release was eventually canceled because of a music license issue concerning three songs.

Werewolf: The Complete Series was released in France by Elephant Films on October 26, 2020.
