= Timura trilogy =

Fantasy series by Allan Cole

The Timura Trilogy or The Complete Timuras comprises three fantasy books written by American author Allan Cole. The setting is a fantasy world where the aspiring wizard Safar Timura, and his childhood friend and conqueror Iraj Protarus aim to unite the humans and, their common enemy, the demons. While the protagonist Timura is important to Protarus, and serves as his Grand Wazier, Protarus wants more power and betrays his friend and becomes the antagonist of the books.

The three volumes are entitled Wizard of the Winds, Wolves of the Gods, and The Gods Awaken. The first one is also known as When the Gods Slept in Great Britain.

Safar Timura is loosely based on Omar Khayyam.

The Norwegian composer Bjørn Lynne has made three albums based on the three books, all of them with written narration by Allan Cole. This narration is read by Cris Blyth at the start of each track in the first album as well as the final track on the last album.

== See also ==
- Wizard of the Winds (album)
- Wolves of the Gods (album)
- The Gods Awaken (album)
