= Sten Adventures Book 1: Sten =

1982 science fiction novel by Chris Bunch and Allan Cole

Sten
- Author: Chris Bunch and Allan Cole
- Cover artist: Ralph Brillhart
- Language: English
- Series: Sten Adventures
- Genre: Science fiction
- Publisher: Del Rey Books, reissued by Orbit Books
- Publication date: 1982
- Publication place: United States
- Media type: Print (paperback)
- Pages: 279
- ISBN: 0-345-28503-4
- OCLC: 9524371
- LC Class: CPB Box no. 2609 vol. 10
- Followed by: The Wolf Worlds

Sten is a science fiction novel by American writers Chris Bunch and Allan Cole, the first book in the Sten Adventures series.

== Plot summary ==
Karl Sten is a young boy growing up on an industrial factory world called Vulcan. The organization ruling Vulcan is known as the Company. Citizens inside the corporate dominated society are stratified into Execs (leaders and politicians), Techs (technicians and skilled labor), and Migs or migrant unskilled workers. The Company recruited Sten's parents, Amos and Freed Sten, using false advertisement. To keep recruiting costs down, the company uses different techniques to keep the Migs on Vulcan.

After Sten's family is killed in an industrial cover-up initiated by Vulcan's CEO, Baron Thoresen, Sten rebels against the laws of Vulcan and escapes to live on his own in the background of the factory world. For several years he runs with the Delinqs, a band of young outlaws that have also rejected the ideals of The Company.

He saves an off-worlder, Ian Mahoney, from a security team that was tracking him. Mahoney is the head of Imperial Intelligence and is trying to gather information on a special project Baron Thoresen is running, called Project Bravo. Mahoney offers Sten and his gang a chance to leave Vulcan if they can get the information he needs.

Unfortunately, during the mission they are discovered and Sten is thought to be the only one who makes it back alive. True to his word, Ian takes Sten off of his home planet, but enlists him in the military to keep him safe. During Imperial Guards training, Sten proves to be a square peg for the traditional military, but perfect for the super secret CIA-type covert branch of intelligence that Ian heads, called Mantis, an offshoot of the Emperor's Intelligence group, Mercury Corp.

While in Mantis, Sten excels and becomes the head of Team 13, with Alex Kilgour, (who has a rather unreasonable distaste of the Clan Campbell) as his second in command. He is a heavy-worlder from New Edinburgh, a planet inhabited by humans originally from Scotland, and speaks in a heavy Scot's burr.

Eventually, The Eternal Emperor assigns Team 13 to bring down the government of Vulcan so the Baron's secret project can be unmasked. Team 13 accomplishes this by organizing a rebellion, which gets out of control and almost tears apart the factory world in a heated frenzy. Sten and Team 13 accomplish the job with sneakiness, judicious violence and a few well placed explosions. Sten confronts his parents' killer, Baron Thoreson, and kills him by ripping his heart out with his bare hands.

At the conclusion of the novel, while being dressed down for killing Thoresen against the emperor's orders, Ian promotes Sten to lieutenant. The Emperor had thought better of his order not to kill the baron but had not been able to get word to the team in the field.

== Reception ==
Reviewing the series for tor.com in 2019, Alan Brown noted that the first volume had a rather generic-looking cover, but otherwise called it "a gripping tale of revenge that is worthy of Rafael Sabatini", concluding that it is a " fun and exciting space opera that has withstood the test of time", with compelling setting, action and characters.
