= White Sister (novel) =

Book by Stephen J. Cannell

- Author: Stephen J. Cannell
- Language: English language
- Series: Shane Scully #6
- Genre: Crime novel
- Publisher: St. Martin's Press
- Publication date: 22 August 2006
- Publication place: United States
- Media type: Print (Hardcover, Paperback)
- ISBN: 0-312-34731-6
- Preceded by: Cold Hit
- Followed by: Three Shirt Deal

White Sister is a 2006 detective novel by American crime author Stephen J. Cannell, and the sixth in Cannell's eleven-book series featuring Shane Scully.

== Plot ==
During a routine day, Detective III Shane Scully accidentally strikes John Bodine, a homeless schizophrenic African America man with his car. After getting him medical attention and trying to offload the man without a lawsuit, Scully is called to a homicide where he finds a cop and former Crip gangbanger in his wife Alexa's car, and Alexa missing. A series of leads eventually finds Scully interrogating Lou "Luna" Maluga, a psychotic sociopath, and his estranged wife Stacy, the titular "White Sister," both big names in the rap music industry.

After being repeatedly ordered to cease investigation and threatened with criminal charges or dismissals, Scully is given an out if he returns his wife's personal computer, only to find a series of romantic emails between his wife and the "Dark Angel," the same police officer found shot in Alexa's car with Alexa's weapon. Later, his son will point out that the majority of the text are veiled references to several rap slang terms and groups, making the messages coded transmissions from the undercover officer. During this time, he receives a phone call from Alexa where she confess to the murder and apparently commits suicide, leaving her in critical condition.

Following Stacy Maluga, Scully is eventually lead to Derek Slater, another rap artist whom Stacy is attempting to turn against her husband by exercising an escape clause in his contract, and Bust-A-Cap, a well dressed, well educated, eloquent gentleman outside of his rap artist persona.

After preventing their murder at Bust-a-Cap's latest concert performance, Scully eventually winds up in Vegas, and is captured along with Derek and Bust-A-Cap, and led out into the desert to be executed. Once there, Scully notices there are three dug graves, which is unusual as only Derek and Bust-A-Cap were targeted for murder and Scully was not expected to be in Las Vegas, let alone captured. As they stand around the graves, Scully idly asks Lou Maluga when he is planning on marrying his mistress and divorcing his wife. Extremely confused by the question, Lou Maluga allows Scully, over Stacy's shrieked objections, that Stacy can't allow Lou to divorce her, as the court costs and division of property would ruin the rap label she's struggled to maintain despite her husband's repeated violent episodes and his bungled business practices.

After pointing out the number of graves, and explaining how the third one was originally meant for Lou, a violent shootout occurs. Lou Maluga and a few of his bodyguards are killed. Stacy, after confronting Scully and explaining how this doesn't affect her plans, is shot by her bodyguard "Insane Wayne," an undercover California Sheriff's officer.

After collecting all the survivors, several quickly confess that they hijacked Alexa and her car, picked up the undercover officer, and executed him with Alexa's weapon, before forcing her to confess to his murder and shooting her in the head. Finding a fire alarm going off in the basement, Scully heads down there to find John Bodine, whom Scully had befriended after a fashion, performing an African tribal dance around Alexa's body. Believing her to have died after being taken off life support, Scully and the doctors are shocked when she spontaneously revives, and slowly begins to recuperate.

== Reception ==
BookReporter.com said of White Sister that "Stephen J. Cannell may have written the book of his career."
