= Shane Scully =

- First appearance: The Tin Collectors
- Last appearance: Vigilante
- Created by: Stephen J. Cannell

In-universe information
- Gender: Male
- Occupation: Police detective
- Nationality: American

Shane Scully is a fictional character who has appeared in eleven detective stories by novelist and television producer Stephen J. Cannell.

== List of novels ==
1. The Tin Collectors (2001)
2. The Viking Funeral (2002)
3. Hollywood Tough (2003)
4. Vertical Coffin (2004)
5. Cold Hit (2005)
6. White Sister (2006)
7. Three Shirt Deal (2008)
8. On the Grind (2009)
9. The Pallbearers (2010)
10. The Prostitutes' Ball (2010)
11. Vigilante (2011)

The first three novels were written in the third person, while the latter eight were written from Shane's first person perspective.

== Background ==
Shane Scully is a fictional Detective III in the LAPD. Similar to Cannell's style when he was working as a television writer, Scully's background is very much a part of how he acts and why he acts the way he does. He grew up in an orphanage. In his early years on the force, he had few friends and tried to operate as sort of a loner type. As the novels have progressed, he has opened himself up to others. In Cold Hit, Scully mentions that he might now be opened up too much.

Since his first appearance, Scully has slowly gained a family. He fell in love with Alexa, who is the chief of detectives for the LAPD. The 2 characters have been married since the end of the 2nd novel in the series. Alexa and Scully live with Chooch Scully, who is Shane Scully's son from a one time fling with a prostitute. Starting with Vertical Coffin, Chooch's girlfriend Delfina also lives with the Scully Family. Finally there is the Scully's cat Franco, whom Shane Scully got from a prostitute whose murder he solved in Hollywood Tough.

== Personality ==
Shane Scully is a tough, hard-nosed cop who often bends the rules in order to get things done. He has an extremely open mind that allows him to "think outside the box" when needed. Examples include Hollywood Tough, where he convinced the LAPD to finance a major motion picture in order to solve the murder of a prostitute. In Cold Hit, he convinced the LAPD to challenge the authority of the Department of Homeland Security in order to solve a series of unsolved serial murders.

In general, Scully respects other officers of the LAPD, but tends to look down on the FBI, Homeland Security or other agencies who try to squash the authority of the LAPD. Scully tends to dislike the media (comparing them to maggots in Cold Hit) as well as most bureaucracy as he sees them as interfering with his work.
