= Frank Lupo =

American television writer and producer (1955–2021)

- Born: January 22, 1955; New York City, U.S.
- Died: February 18, 2021 (aged 66); Lady Lake, Florida, U.S.
- Occupations: Television writer; producer

Frank Lupo (January 22, 1955 – February 18, 2021) was an American television writer and producer who created or co-created many successful TV series from the 1970s to the 1990s. In collaboration with Stephen J. Cannell, Lupo created such shows as The A-Team, Renegade, Riptide, Wiseguy and Hunter. He also served as the executive producer for Walker, Texas Ranger during its first full season.

After working with Glen A. Larson on shows like Magnum, P.I., he left Universal Television in 1981, and joined Stephen J. Cannell Productions as staff writer.

Lupo died of cardiac arrest at his home in Florida on February 18, 2021, at the age of 66.

== Filmography ==
- Sword of Justice (1978)
- Battlestar Galactica (1979)
- B. J. and the Bear (1979–1980)
- The Misadventures of Sheriff Lobo (1979–1981)
- Galactica 1980 (1980)
- Magnum, P.I. (1981)
- The Greatest American Hero (1981–1983)
- The A-Team (1983–1987) (Co-Creator, with Stephen J. Cannell)
- Riptide (1984–1986) (Co-Creator, with Stephen J. Cannell)
- Hunter (1984–1991) (Creator)
- Stingray (1987)
- Werewolf (1987) (Creator)
- Wiseguy (1987–1990) (Co-Creator, with Stephen J. Cannell)
- Something Is Out There (1988)
- Hardball (1989)
- Raven (1992)
- Walker: Texas Ranger (1993)
- Lawless (1997)
- Raven: Return of the Black Dragons (1997)
- Adrenaline Run (2000)
- Hunter: Return to Justice (2002)
- Hunter: Back in Force (2003)
- Painkiller Jane (2007)
