= Chris Bunch =

American speculative fiction and television writer (1943–2005)

- Born: December 22, 1943; Fresno, California, U.S.
- Died: July 4, 2005 (aged 61); Ilwaco, Washington, U.S.
- Education: Mira Costa High School; California State University, Los Angeles
- Occupations: Novelist, television writer
- Relatives: Allan Cole (brother-in-law)
- Writing career
- Genres: Science fiction, Fantasy
- Notable works: Sten series A Reckoning for Kings

Christopher R. Bunch (December 22, 1943 – July 4, 2005) was an American science fiction, fantasy and television writer, who wrote and co-wrote about thirty novels.

== Early life and education ==
Bunch was born in Fresno, California and attended Mira Costa High School in Manhattan Beach, where he met his future writing partner Allan Cole, who later became his brother-in-law after marrying Bunch's sister Kathryn. He joined the United States Army and served 14 months in Vietnam during the Vietnam War in 1965–66, serving as a patrol commander. He attended California State University, Los Angeles.

== Career ==
=== Television ===
Bunch and Cole began writing for television in the late 1970s, eventually selling more than 150 scripts together over the course of their partnership. Working under executive producer Glen A. Larson, the pair contributed two episodes to Buck Rogers in the 25th Century (1980) and co-wrote the pilot of The Misadventures of Sheriff Lobo with Larson. Their other television credits included The Incredible Hulk, Quincy, M.E., Magnum, P.I., B.J. and the Bear, The Rockford Files, Hunter, The A-Team, The Smurfs, and Walker, Texas Ranger. They wrote the A-Team episode "Pure-Dee Poison" (1984) and served as story editors on the supernatural drama Werewolf.

Bunch and Cole, who had not previously worked on Battlestar Galactica, were hired as two of three story editors on its sequel series, Galactica 1980. According to the pair, they had not sought the position; they said a Universal Television executive threatened to bar them from future work at the studio if they declined the assignment. The series, broadcast in a children's programming timeslot mandated by ABC, required them to insert network-mandated "educational beats" into scripts written almost entirely by series creator Larson, leaving them with little creative input of their own. Their work often led to clashes with Susan Futterman, ABC's then newly installed head of Broadcast Standards and Practices. Galactica 1980 was cancelled partway through production of its eleventh episode, "The Day They Kidnapped Cleopatra," which he and Cole had co-written the shooting version of. The pair also wrote for the 1985 NBC drama Hell Town before scaling back their television work in favor of novel-writing.

=== Novels ===
With Cole, Bunch co-wrote the eight-volume military science fiction series collected as The Sten Chronicles (1982–1993) and the fantasy Anteros trilogy. Their 1987 novel A Reckoning for Kings, set during the Tet Offensive of the Vietnam War, was nominated for the Pulitzer Prize and was praised by a Los Angeles Times reviewer as "an excellent piece of work by two journeymen writers that makes one think."

Bunch and Cole's writing partnership ended in 1995. Bunch then continued as a solo novelist, producing the Shadow Warrior space opera trilogy, the Seer King fantasy trilogy, The Last Legion military science fiction series, the Star Risk series, and the Dragonmaster trilogy.

== Personal life ==
By 1993, Bunch and Cole had relocated from Southern California to the Long Beach Peninsula in Washington state, with Bunch settling in the nearby community of Chinook.

In June 1996, Bunch shot and killed Michael G. Mauch, 26, a neighbor at the rural-vehicle park in Chinook where Bunch was living at the time. Bunch said he had fired in self-defense after Mauch threatened and charged him during a confrontation. Following a Pacific County coroner's inquest, a jury returned a verdict of justifiable homicide in August 1996, and no charges were filed.

Bunch later settled in his hometown of Ilwaco, Washington, where he died on July 4, 2005, after a long battle with a lung ailment.

== List of works ==
=== Solo novels, series and short stories ===
==== The Seer King Trilogy ====
- The Seer King (1997) (ISBN 0-446-60524-7)
- The Demon King (1998) (ISBN 0-446-67327-7)
- The Warrior King (1999) (ISBN 0-446-67456-7)

==== Dragonmaster Trilogy ====
- Storm of Wings (2002) (ISBN 1-84149-104-7)
- Knighthood of the Dragon (2003) (ISBN 1-84149-216-7)
- The Last Battle (2004) (ISBN 1-84149-179-9)

Dragonmaster is an action trilogy following the life and exploits of Hal Kailas, a peasant who left home at an early age. During his early years Hal must work as a casual laborer. His dream is to fly dragons, so he joins a traveling troupe who give rides on dragons as entertainment from town to town. Hal is away from his home country and his king, Asir. When war breaks out, he is drafted into the army as an unwilling soldier. However, he does his best and works his way through the ranks of the army and society with his heroic exploits. Dragons are mainly wild and untamed creatures that are brought into the war, while Hal and others devise new and more damaging ways to use the dragons against their enemies. This tale is told in the first two books, which contain bloody action throughout. The third book covers life after the war, the difficulties ex-soldiers face, and how Hal deals with it.

==== The Last Legion ====
- The Last Legion (1999) (ISBN 0-451-45686-6)
- Firemask (2000) (ISBN 0-451-45687-4)
- Storm Force (2000) (ISBN 0-451-45688-2)
- Homefall (2001) (ISBN 0-451-45841-9)

==== Shadow Warrior ====
- Shadow Warrior: The Wind After Time (1996) (ISBN 0-345-38735-X)
- Shadow Warrior: Hunt the Heavens (1996) (ISBN 0-345-38736-8)
- Shadow Warrior: Darkness of God (1997) (ISBN 0-345-38737-6)

==== Star Risk Series ====
- Star Risk, Ltd. (2002) (ISBN 0-451-45889-3)
- The Scoundrel Worlds (2003) (ISBN 0-451-45936-9)
- The Doublecross Program (2004) (ISBN 0-451-45986-5)
- The Dog From Hell (2005) (ISBN 0-451-46039-1)

An outlined novel in the Star Risk, Ltd. series, The Gangster Conspiracy (2007), was finished by Bunch's friend Steve Perry and his son, Dal Perry.

==== The Shannon Trilogy ====
- A Daughter of Liberty
- The War of the Shannons
- A Reckoning for Kings (1987) (ISBN 0-689-11707-8)

==== Novels ====
- The Empire Stone (2000) (ISBN 3-442-24965-1)
- Corsair (2001) (ISBN 3-442-24964-3)

Corsair follows the tale of Gareth Radnor, who goes to live with his rich uncle, after the death of his parents at the hands of the evil Lynathi slavers. He has to leave the city after a prank goes wrong and someone dies. He quickly makes a life for himself at sea but always longs to revenge his parents and the other villagers. When an opportunity comes, he takes it and makes a name for himself and a fortune as a pirate, and gains public support for his revenge on the Lynathi. His two childhood friends, and two more from when he lived with his uncle in the city of Ticao, travel with him on his adventures; one is Cosyra, his love interest.

==== Short stories ====
- "Tarnished Glory" (2002) (collected in Harry Turtledove's anthology Alternate Generals II)
- "Murdering Uncle Ho" (2005) (collected in Harry Turtledove's anthology Alternate Generals III)

=== Novels and series co-authored with Allan Cole ===
==== Sten ====
Known as The Sten Chronicles (or sometimes the Sten Adventures), this series of books is set in the far future of mankind. While the main attraction of the series was the action and understated humor, the series was actually a political critique. It had seemed to Bunch and Cole that entirely too many science fiction authors were enamored with monarchies and their consequent fascist (although benevolent) ideals. They wanted to write a series to show the realities of politics and power and to place a working-class man into this series, letting the reader see through his eyes and watch as he grows to be a real and realistic hero.

1. Sten (1982) (ISBN 0-345-32460-9)
2. The Wolf Worlds (1984) (ISBN 0-345-31229-5)
3. The Court of a Thousand Suns (1985) (ISBN 0-345-31681-9)
4. Fleet of the Damned (1988) (ISBN 0-345-33172-9)
5. Revenge of the Damned (1989) (ISBN 0-345-33173-7)
6. The Return of the Emperor (1990) (ISBN 0-345-36130-X)
7. Vortex (1992) (ISBN 0-345-37151-8)
8. Empire's End (1993) (ISBN 0-345-37696-X)

==== Anteros ====
- The Far Kingdoms (1985) (ISBN 0-345-38056-8)
- The Warrior's Tale (1994) (ISBN 0-345-38734-1)
- Kingdoms of the Night (1995) (ISBN 0-345-38732-5)
