= Stephen J. Cannell =

American television producer and writer (1941–2010)

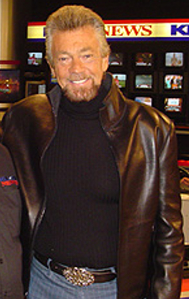
- Cannell at KUSI News, San Diego, California in 2005
- Born: Stephen Joseph Cannell; February 5, 1941; Los Angeles, California, U.S.
- Died: September 30, 2010 (aged 69); Pasadena, California, U.S.
- Resting place: Forest Lawn Memorial Park (Hollywood Hills)
- Education: University of Oregon (BS)
- Occupations: Television producer; writer; novelist; director; actor
- Years active: 1968–2010
- Known for: Founder of The Cannell Studios
- Spouse: Marcia Finch (m. 1964)
- Children: 4, including Tawnia
- Awards: Emmy Awards
- Website: cannell.com

Stephen Joseph Cannell (/ˈkænəl/; February 5, 1941 – September 30, 2010) was an American television producer, writer, novelist, actor, and founder of Cannell Entertainment (formerly Stephen J. Cannell Productions) and The Cannell Studios.

After starting his career as a television screenwriter, Cannell created or co-created several dozen successful TV series from the 1970s to the 1990s, often with his creative partner Frank Lupo. Cannell's creations include The Rockford Files, The A-Team, Renegade, The Greatest American Hero, 21 Jump Street, Hunter, and The Commish. He also wrote novels, notably the Shane Scully mystery series.

== Early life ==
Cannell was born in Los Angeles and raised in nearby Pasadena. He was the son of Carolyn (née Baker) and Joseph Knapp Cannell. Joseph owned the highly successful interior decorating company Cannell and Chaffin. Cannell struggled with dyslexia in school, but did graduate from the University of Oregon in 1964 with a Bachelor of Science degree in journalism. At UO, he joined the Sigma Chi fraternity.

The 2009 documentary Dislecksia: The Movie features an interview with Cannell, in which he discusses his struggles with dyslexia and how he managed to be such a successful writer despite his difficulties reading. During the interview, he mentions how he used to hire typists to overcome his "spelling problem" (as he refers to his dyslexia) but also describes how he feels his condition has enriched his life.

== Career ==
After college, Cannell spent four years working with the family business before selling his first script to the Universal series It Takes a Thief in 1968. He was quickly hired by Universal Television, the television production branch of Universal Studios and was soon freelance writing for such other crime shows as Ironside (1970–1971) and Columbo (1973).

In 1971, he received a telephone call from friend Herman Saunders who was the producer on Jack Webb's police series Adam-12. They needed a script right away and Saunders asked if Cannell would be interested in writing it. He delivered what they wanted in one day, his first full-time gig, and was soon hired as story editor of the series, then in its fourth season, until 1973.

For Universal Television, Cannell created or co-created Chase (1973–1974), The Rockford Files (1974–1980), Baretta (1975–1978), City of Angels (1976), and Baa Baa Black Sheep (1976–1978). His work on police and private investigator-oriented projects changed the prevailing tone from the then-popular "police procedural" pioneered by Jack Webb, to quirky, looser-themed personal stories, such as "Rockford" and "Baretta." He won the Primetime Emmy Award for Outstanding Drama Series in 1978 for The Rockford Files.

In a 2002 interview, Cannell described his early financial arrangements, saying that at Universal,

I signed a deal as a head writer to make $600 a week. I was the cheapest writer on the lot. It was the lowest deal you could do by Writers Guild standards. But I'd been working for my dad for $7000 a year. I was at Universal for eight years and I never renegotiated my deal but once. It was late in my arrangement with Universal. There was one thing in my deal that my agent had managed to get in there—I had good fees for my pilots. The reason they did it is that they never thought I was going to write a pilot. So they'd give me $70,000 to write a two-hour pilot and a $100,000 production bonus if it ever got made. Then I became the hottest pilot writer at Universal. I was writing two or three pilots a season. I was making $400,000 a year in pilot fees.

In 1979, Cannell left Universal and formed his own company, Stephen J. Cannell Productions. For the first few years, Cannell's office was located on the lot at Paramount Studios in Hollywood, though his earlier work at Universal was still distributed by MCA-Universal. His first series under his new banner was Tenspeed and Brown Shoe (1980), and was soon followed by The Greatest American Hero (1981–1983), The Quest (1982), The A-Team (1983–1987), Hardcastle and McCormick (1983–1986), Riptide (1984–1986), and Hunter (1984–1991). Cannell's offices relocated to larger facilities on Hollywood Boulevard in 1983.

In 1986, Cannell was co-founder, along with Tri-Star Pictures and Witt/Thomas Productions, of the syndication distributor TeleVentures. In late 1988, Witt/Thomas Productions exited the TeleVentures venture and entered a distribution deal with Walt Disney Television, selling its share to Cannell. On July 11, 1990, both Tri-Star and Cannell dissolved the TeleVentures joint venture, and Tri-Star sold its shares to Stephen J. Cannell Productions. TeleVentures thus became Cannell Distribution Co.

Also in 1986, with the favorable exchange rate between the US and Canadian dollars being a win/win for US producers, Cannell decided to shoot his new series Stingray (1985–1987) in Toronto. However, so many producers were shooting in Toronto that no crews were available to staff any additional productions. Consequently, Cannell shot the first seven episodes of Stingray's second season in Calgary with the remaining eight episodes being shot in Vancouver. His first series to entirely be shot in Vancouver was 21 Jump Street (1987–1991), the highest-rated show of the new Fox network's first season.

With more series being shot in Vancouver, Cannell said, "We were fighting with everybody for locations and stage space". His solution was to build a new, state-of-the-art facility, The North Shore Studios, on 13 acres with one hundred thousand square feet of office space and seven sound stages. The series 21 Jump Street was soon followed by J.J. Starbuck (1987–1988), Wiseguy (1987–1990), Unsub (1989), Top of the Hill (1989), Booker (1989–1990), Broken Badges (1990–1991), Palace Guard (1991), Scene of the Crime (1991–1992), The Commish (1991–1996), Street Justice (1991–1993), Silk Stalkings (1991–1999), The Hat Squad (1992–1993), Renegade (1992–1997), Cobra (1993–1994), and Hawkeye (1994–1995). A number of television films were also shot in Vancouver by Cannell's production company.

On July 31, 1995, New World Communications acquired his Cannell Entertainment production company. Cannell then founded The Cannell Studios. One of the first shows produced by the newly established Cannell Studios was the corporate drama Profit (1996).

Cannell created or co-created nearly 40 television series, mostly crime dramas. In the process, he had by his own count, scripted more than 450 episodes, and produced or executive produced over 1,500 episodes.

In May 1988, Cannell was a panelist in the John Davidson edition of Hollywood Squares. He also served as the host of the 1991–92 series Scene of the Crime, a mystery anthology series with a repertory cast, and of the 1995–1996 syndicated documentary series U.S. Customs Classified, focusing on the work of the U.S Customs Service.

Cannell also acted occasionally, including a recurring role as main antagonist "Dutch" Dixon on his series Renegade. He also took a turn in the season 6 episode of Silk Stalkings titled "Loyalty", in which the script called for lead character Sgt. Tom Ryan to tell him, "You look just like that writer on TV," to which Cannell's character, a car salesman, responds, "I get that all the time." Cannell appeared as himself in the 2009 pilot of the ABC show Castle and again in two episodes of season two. Along with James Patterson, Dennis Lehane, and Michael Connelly, he was one of Castle's poker buddies. In season three following Cannell's death, an empty seat at the poker table is described as Cannell's, and remains empty for a full year in tribute to him.

Beginning in 1995, Cannell turned his attention to writing novels. His first novel, The Plan, was released in 1997 by Avon. As of 2010, he had written 18, 11 of which featured the character of detective Shane Scully of the Los Angeles Police Department. Seven are stand-alone novels. The last in the series, Vigilante, was released December 2011 by St. Martin's Press.

Cannell's TV series The A-Team was remade into a 2010 feature-length film. Cannell served as a producer and creative consultant for the project. His other series 21 Jump Street was made into a 2012 feature by Columbia Pictures and Metro Goldwyn Mayer, and into the sequel 22 Jump Street which was released in June 2014.

As of 2026, the rights to most of Cannell's television library are owned by Lionsgate. The A-Team and Hunter are currently owned by Comcast (via Universal Television), as are all shows Cannell worked on while employed by Universal (which became co-owned with NBC, which aired The A-Team and Hunter).

The Commish, which Cannell left as a result of ABC co-producing the series with Genesis Entertainment, is now wholly owned by The Walt Disney Company (via Disney Media and Entertainment Distribution on behalf of ABC Studios), while another Cannell-produced series for ABC, The Greatest American Hero, is now owned by Skydance (via Warner Bros. Television). The show's original distributor was Lorimar, and Lorimar's library was eventually absorbed into that of Warner Bros.

== Personal life ==
Cannell married his high school sweetheart, Marcia Finch, in 1964. He "asked her to go steady (with him) in the eighth grade". They had two daughters, Tawnia and Chelsea, and two sons, Cody and Derek. Derek died in 1982 at age 15 when a sand castle he was building at the beach collapsed and suffocated him. The tragedy occurred during the filming of the "Captain Bellybuster" episode of The Greatest American Hero. Actor William Katt, who is a musician, wrote a song for Cannell titled "Cody the Cowboy". Cannell was so touched by this gift that he named his next son Cody in honor of the song.

Cannell was dyslexic and was a spokesman on the subject. According to an episode of Paul Harvey's The Rest of the Story, Cannell frequently had to dictate ideas or even complete scripts with the help of his personal secretary Grace Curcio, an employee of 20 years. Following Curcio's retirement in 2003, Kathy Ezso became his editor and executive assistant. He discusses his experiences as a dyslexic in the 2009 documentary Dislecksia: The Movie.

Cannell wrote on a typewriter, an IBM Selectric, when not dictating to an assistant, and only used a computer for research purposes.

Cannell was 69 when he died on September 30, 2010, from complications of melanoma. He is interred at Forest Lawn Memorial Park in the Hollywood Hills of Los Angeles. In tribute to his memory, the producers of Castle ended their third-season episode "Punked" with a new version of Cannell's production company logo, which featured video of Cannell at his typewriter tossing out a typed sheet, over a caption reading, "Stephen J. Cannell. Colleague. Mentor. Friend. We'll miss you, pal." The episode aired October 11, 2010 on ABC.

== Selected filmography ==
- Ironside (1970) (writer)
- The D.A. (1971)
- Adam-12 (1971–1973) (story editor)
- Chase (1973) (creator)
- Columbo (1973) (writer)
- Toma (1973)
- The Rockford Files (1974–1980) (co-creator, with Roy Huggins)
- Switch (1975) (writer)
- Baretta (1975) (creator)
- City of Angels (1976) (co-creator, with Roy Huggins)
- Richie Brockelman, Private Eye (co-creator, with Steven Bochco) (1976)
- Baa Baa Black Sheep (a.k.a. Black Sheep Squadron) (1976–1978) (creator)
- The Duke (1979)
- Stone (1980) (co-creator, with Richard Levinson and William Link)
- Tenspeed and Brown Shoe (1980) (creator; first series as an independent)
- The Greatest American Hero (1981–1983) (creator)
- Midnight Offerings (1981) (TV movie; executive producer only)
- The Quest (1982) (co-executive producer; series created by Juanita Bartlett)
- The Rousters (1983) (creator)
- The A-Team (1983–1987) (co-creator, with Frank Lupo)
- Hardcastle and McCormick (1983–1986) (co-creator, with Patrick Hasburgh)
- Hunter (1984–1991) (series created by Frank Lupo)
- Riptide (1984–1986) (co-creator, with Frank Lupo)
- The Last Precinct (1986) (co-creator, with Frank Lupo)
- Stingray (1986–1987) (creator)
- J.J. Starbuck (1987) (creator)
- Wiseguy (1987–1990) (co-creator, with Frank Lupo)
- 21 Jump Street (1987–1991) (co-creator, with Patrick Hasburgh)
- Sonny Spoon (1988) (co-creator, with Michael Daly, Diana Prince and Randall Wallace)
- Unsub (1989) (developer; series created by Stephen Kronish and David J. Burke)
- Top of the Hill (1989) (co-creator with Art Monterastelli)
- Booker (1989–1990) (co-creator, with Eric Blakeney)
- Broken Badges (1990) (co-creator, with Randall Wallace)
- Always Remember I Love You (1990) (TV movie)
- The Great Pretender (1991) (writer; unsold pilot)
- Street Justice (1991–1993) (series created by David Levinson, Mark Lisson and David H. Balkan)
- Silk Stalkings (1991–1999) (creator; also guest starred in two episodes)
- A Place for Annie (1994) (Hallmark Hall of Fame film)
- The 100 Lives of Black Jack Savage (1991) (co-creator, with James Wong and Glen Morgan)
- The Commish (1991–1996) (co-creator, with Stephen Kronish)
- Palace Guard (1991) (creator)
- Personals (1991–1992)
- Renegade (1992–1997) (creator; also guest starred in several episodes, as Donald "Dutch" Dixon)
- The Hat Squad (1992–1993) (co-creator, with Bill Nuss)
- Missing Persons (1993–1994) (series created by Peter Lance and Gary Sherman)
- Cobra (1993–1994) (co-creator, with Craig W. Van Sickle and Steven Long Mitchell)
- Caesars Challenge (1993–1994)
- Traps (1994) (creator)
- Hawkeye (1994–1995) (series created by Kim LeMasters)
- Marker (1995) (creator)
- Profit (1996) (series created by David Greenwalt and John McNamara)

=== Distribution ===
Cannell sold his company in March 1995 to New World Communications for $30 million and News Corporation acquired New World in 1996. However, two of Cannell's series, The A-Team and Hunter are controlled by two other studios: Universal Television for the former and Sony Pictures Television for the latter and were not part of the deal. Also part of the deal, Cannell would pay Fox for international and domestic sales for his series. On May 4, 1998, Cannell reacquired his library from Fox.

On January 24, 2006, The Carsey-Werner Company acquired distribution rights to Cannell's library.

In March 2020, the Cannell estate signed a worldwide distribution deal with Shout! Factory.

== Notable acting credits ==
- All My Children (1985) TV series, as Himself (guest role).
- Magnum, P.I. (1986) TV series, as Hotel Detective / Security Chief Ray Lemon (guest role).
- Renegade (1992–1997) as Donald "Dutch" Dixon (Series regular). Also show's creator.
- Diagnosis: Murder (1997–1999) TV series, as Jackson Burley (guest role)
- Pacific Blue (1999–2000) TV series, as Judge J. Gunnar Halloran (guest role)
- Half Past Dead (2002) Steven Seagal film, as Frank Hubbard
- Ice Spiders (2007) made-for-TV movie, as Frank Stone
- Castle (2009) TV series, recurring guest role as Himself

== Books ==
Shane Scully series

1. The Tin Collectors (2001)
2. The Viking Funeral (2002)
3. Hollywood Tough (2003)
4. Vertical Coffin (2004)
5. Cold Hit (2005)
6. White Sister (2006)
7. Three Shirt Deal (2007)
8. On the Grind (2009)
9. The Pallbearers (2010)
10. The Prostitutes' Ball (2010)
11. Vigilante (2011)

Other novels

- The Plan (1996)
- Final Victim (1997)
- King Con (1998)
- Riding the Snake (1999)
- The Devil's Workshop (2000)
- Runaway Heart (2003)
- At First Sight (2008)
