= Allan Cole =

American author and TV writer (1943–2019)

- Born: November 19, 1943; Philadelphia, Pennsylvania
- Died: March 29, 2019 (aged 75); Boca Raton, Florida
- Occupations: Novelist, television writer
- Writing career
- Genres: Science fiction, Fantasy, Detective, Historical
- Website: www.acole.com

Allan Cole (November 19, 1943 – March 29, 2019) was an American author and television writer, who wrote or co-wrote nearly thirty books.

The son of a CIA operative, Cole was born in Philadelphia, Pennsylvania, and raised in Europe, the Middle East and the Far East. He collaborated with Chris Bunch on the Sten science fiction series, as well the Far Kingdoms Series, and the historical novels, A Reckoning for Kings and A Daughter of Liberty. He coauthored a non-fiction book—A Cop's Life—with his uncle, Thomas Grubb; and a fantasy novel—Lords of Terror—with Russian author Nick Perumov. His solo books include the fantasy novels that make up the Timura Trilogy, and the thrillers Dying Good and Drowned Hopes.

He sold more than a hundred television episodes, including ones for Quincy, M.E., The Rockford Files, The Incredible Hulk, Dinosaucers, Buck Rogers in the 25th Century, Magnum, P.I., Werewolf, and Walker, Texas Ranger.

He was also a Los Angeles newspaper editor and investigative reporter for 14 years.

Cole was married to Bunch's sister, Kathryn. He died of cancer in Boca Raton, Florida, aged 75, on March 29, 2019.

== Novels and series co-authored with Chris Bunch ==
=== Sten ===
Known as The Sten Chronicles (or sometimes the Sten Adventures), this series of books is set in the far future of mankind. While the main draw of the series was the action and understated humor, the series was actually a political critique. It had seemed to Bunch and Cole that entirely too many science fiction authors were enamored with monarchies and their consequent fascist (although benevolent) ideals. They wanted to write a series to show the realities of politics and power and to place a working-class man into this series, letting the reader see through his eyes and watch as he grows to be a real, and realistic, hero.

- Sten (1982) (ISBN 0-345-32460-9)
- The Wolf Worlds (1984) (ISBN 0-345-31229-5)
- The Court of a Thousand Suns (1985) (ISBN 0-345-31681-9)
- Fleet of the Damned (1988) (ISBN 0-345-33172-9)
- Revenge of the Damned (1989) (ISBN 0-345-33173-7)
- The Return of the Emperor (1990) (ISBN 0-345-36130-X)
- Vortex (1992) (ISBN 0-345-37151-8)
- Empire's End (1993) (ISBN 0-345-37696-X)

=== Anteros ===
- The Far Kingdoms (1985) (ISBN 0-345-38056-8)
- The Warrior's Tale (1994) (ISBN 0-345-38734-1)
- Kingdoms of the Night (1995) (ISBN 0-345-38732-5)
- The Warrior Returns (1996) (ISBN 0-345-41312-1)

=== Novels ===
- A Reckoning for Kings (1987; ISBN 0-689-11707-8)
