= Timothy John Smith =

Timothy John Smith may refer to:

- Tim Smith (British politician) (born 1947), British politician
- Timothy John Smith (actor), American actor

== See also ==
- Tim Smith (disambiguation)
