= The Equalizer (film) =

2014 American film by Antoine Fuqua

- Theatrical release poster
- Directed by: Antoine Fuqua
- Written by: Richard Wenk
- Based on: The Equalizer by: Michael Sloan; Richard Lindheim
- Produced by: Todd Black; Jason Blumenthal; Denzel Washington; Alex Siskin; Steve Tisch; Mace Neufeld; Tony Eldridge; Michael Sloan
- Starring: Denzel Washington; Marton Csokas; Chloë Grace Moretz; David Harbour; Bill Pullman; Melissa Leo
- Cinematography: Mauro Fiore
- Edited by: John Refoua
- Music by: Harry Gregson-Williams
- Production companies: Columbia Pictures; LStar Capital; Village Roadshow Pictures; Escape Artists; Mace Neufeld Productions; Zhiv Productions
- Distributed by: Sony Pictures Releasing
- Release dates: September 7, 2014 (TIFF); September 26, 2014 (United States)
- Running time: 132 minutes
- Country: United States
- Language: English
- Budget: $55–73 million
- Box office: $193 million

The Equalizer is a 2014 American vigilante action-thriller film directed by Antoine Fuqua and written by Richard Wenk. It is based on the 1980s TV series of the same title and the first of three films starring Denzel Washington. The cast includes Marton Csokas, Chloë Grace Moretz, David Harbour, Bill Pullman, and Melissa Leo. Washington plays Robert McCall, a retired Marine and former DIA officer, who reluctantly returns to action to protect a teenage trafficking victim from members of the Russian mafia.

Principal photography took place in Massachusetts from May 2013 to September 2013. The world premiere for The Equalizer was held at 2014 Toronto International Film Festival on September 7, 2014, and it was released worldwide on September 26, 2014. The film received generally positive reviews from critics and was a commercial success, grossing $193 million worldwide. The sequels, The Equalizer 2 and The Equalizer 3, were released on July 20, 2018, and September 1, 2023, respectively.

== Plot ==
Robert McCall, a former Marine and retired DIA/DCS officer, lives in Boston and works at a big-box home improvement store. He helps his colleague Ralphie train to become a security guard. Unable to sleep, McCall often spends late nights reading at an all-night diner, where he befriends Teri, a teenage sex worker trafficked by the Russian mafia. One evening, Teri shares that her real name is Alina and that she dreams of becoming a singer. McCall and Alina take a stroll, but Alina's pimp Slavi abruptly arrives, hits her and forces her into a car. Slavi hands McCall a business card for their escort service before driving away.

A few nights later, a badly injured Alina is admitted to the ICU at a nearby hospital. Upon hearing the news, McCall learns from her friend Mandy that Slavi is responsible for her condition. Finding Slavi and his men at their restaurant, he is bluntly refused when he offers to buy Alina's freedom, so he swiftly kills them all. Unbeknownst to McCall, Slavi and his men are part of a much larger crime syndicate led by Russian oligarch Vladimir Pushkin. Teddy Rensen, Pushkin's enforcer, arrives in Boston to investigate the attack. Aided by Boston police detectives on Pushkin's payroll, Teddy canvasses rival gangs in the area, beating Irish mob lieutenant "Little John" Looney almost to death to send a message.

McCall continues exacting vigilante justice on the criminals he encounters. He blackmails two corrupt cops into returning racketeering money to Ralphie's mother and beats a gunman with a hammer after he robbed the hardware store, taking a coworker's heirloom ring from her. Teddy kills Mandy after learning that she has concealed information about McCall. He visits McCall at his apartment, where both try to intimidate each other. Teddy and his goons later try to kidnap McCall, who eludes them.

McCall's former DIA colleague, Susan Plummer, identifies Teddy as Nicolai Itchenko, formerly of USSR secret police, with Spetsnaz background. He has murdered two of the Boston police detectives who failed to kidnap McCall; a third, named Frank Masters had not been heard from for days. Susan also briefs McCall on Pushkin's operation. McCall tracks Masters down and threatens him into helping take down one of Pushkin's money laundering warehouses. Masters and Pushkin's men are taken into custody when the police arrive and find a note left by McCall to "follow the money." He confronts Nicolai again, threatening to commit more damage if he continues to pursue him.

McCall destroys two of Pushkin's oil tankers. Nicolai abducts McCall's coworkers at the hardware store to force a meeting. To Nicolai's surprise, McCall skips the meeting and kills the men to ensure the safety of the hostages they were guarding. Nicolai arrives with his men, but McCall stealthily kills them with improvised weapons collected throughout the hardware store and later kills Nicolai with a nail gun to save a cornered Ralphie.

Three days later, McCall finds Pushkin at his Moscow mansion, kills the guards and tricks him into electrocuting himself. Alina, following her recovery, runs into McCall and shares that she has started a new life with the money that was left at her hospital bed (although she does not know it was by him). Inspired to continue helping others, McCall responds to online ads requesting help, calling himself The Equalizer.

== Cast ==
- Denzel Washington as Robert McCall
- Marton Csokas as Teddy/Nicolai
- Chloë Grace Moretz as Teri/Alina
- David Harbour as Frank Masters
- Haley Bennett as Mandy
- Bill Pullman as Brian Plummer
- Melissa Leo as Susan Plummer
- David Meunier as Slavi
- Johnny Skourtis as Ralphie
- Alex Veadov as Tevi
- Vladimir Kulich as Vladimir Pushkin
- Roger Mitchell as the lead investigator

In addition, Allen Maldonado plays Robert's coworker Marcus, Robert Wahlberg and Timothy John Smith play the crooked Boston Police Department detectives, and Johnny Messner plays one of Teddy's henchmen.

== Production ==
=== Development and casting ===
In April 2005, it was announced producer Mace Neufeld had partnered with Michael Sloan, co-creator of The Equalizer, and producer Tony Eldridge, to come up with the idea for adapting the series to film while working on another project. In December of that year, The Weinstein Company had acquired the rights to develop the film. In June 2007, it was reported that Michael Connelly and Terrill Lee Lankfor were hired to pen the screenplay with Paul McGuigan slated to direct.

In June 2010, it was announced that Russell Crowe was trying to bring The Equalizer to the big screen directed by Paul Haggis, with Crowe intending to play Robert McCall.

In December 2011, it was reported that Denzel Washington would star in the title role of the film version, to be financed by Sony Pictures Entertainment and Escape Artists. In 2012, Nicolas Winding Refn entered talks to direct the remake, but the deal with Sony fell through for unknown reasons. Director Antoine Fuqua came on board to direct on March 21, 2013, reuniting him with Washington after their successful collaboration on the 2001 Oscar-winning film Training Day. Chloë Grace Moretz was announced as a co-star on May 10, 2013; Anna Kendrick, Kelly Macdonald and Nina Dobrev were also considered.

On May 31, 2013, Melissa Leo was cast in the film. Leo previously worked with Washington in the 2012 film Flight, and with Fuqua in Olympus Has Fallen (2013). Coincidentally, Leo actually guest starred in a season one episode of the original Equalizer television series titled "The Defector", in which she portrayed the daughter of a former Soviet agent, who enlists McCall's help to defect to the United States. Marton Csokas was cast to play the villain on May 17.

=== Filming ===
Principal photography began in May 2013 at various locations throughout Boston including Haverhill, Hamilton, Ipswich and Swampscott. Filming wrapped in September 2013.

In the scene where McCall attempts to suffocate Masters in his car, it is a Series III Jaguar XJ6 revealed in the shot of the hose into the tailpipe. The Jaguar was famously used in the original television series.

== Music ==
On June 21, 2013, Harry Gregson-Williams was hired to compose the music for the film. Varèse Sarabande released a soundtrack album for The Equalizer on September 23, 2014. The song "Guts Over Fear" by rapper Eminem featuring Sia, with production by Emile Haynie, premiered in trailers for the film. The song also plays over the closing credits. Harry Gregson-Williams' score received critical acclaim for its ability to heighten the tension and atmosphere of the film. The album peaked at number 26 on the Billboard 200 chart, showcasing the popularity of the music beyond the movie itself. "Guts Over Fear" became a significant component of the film's marketing campaign, garnering widespread attention and further solidifying The Equalizer's impact on popular culture.

== Release ==
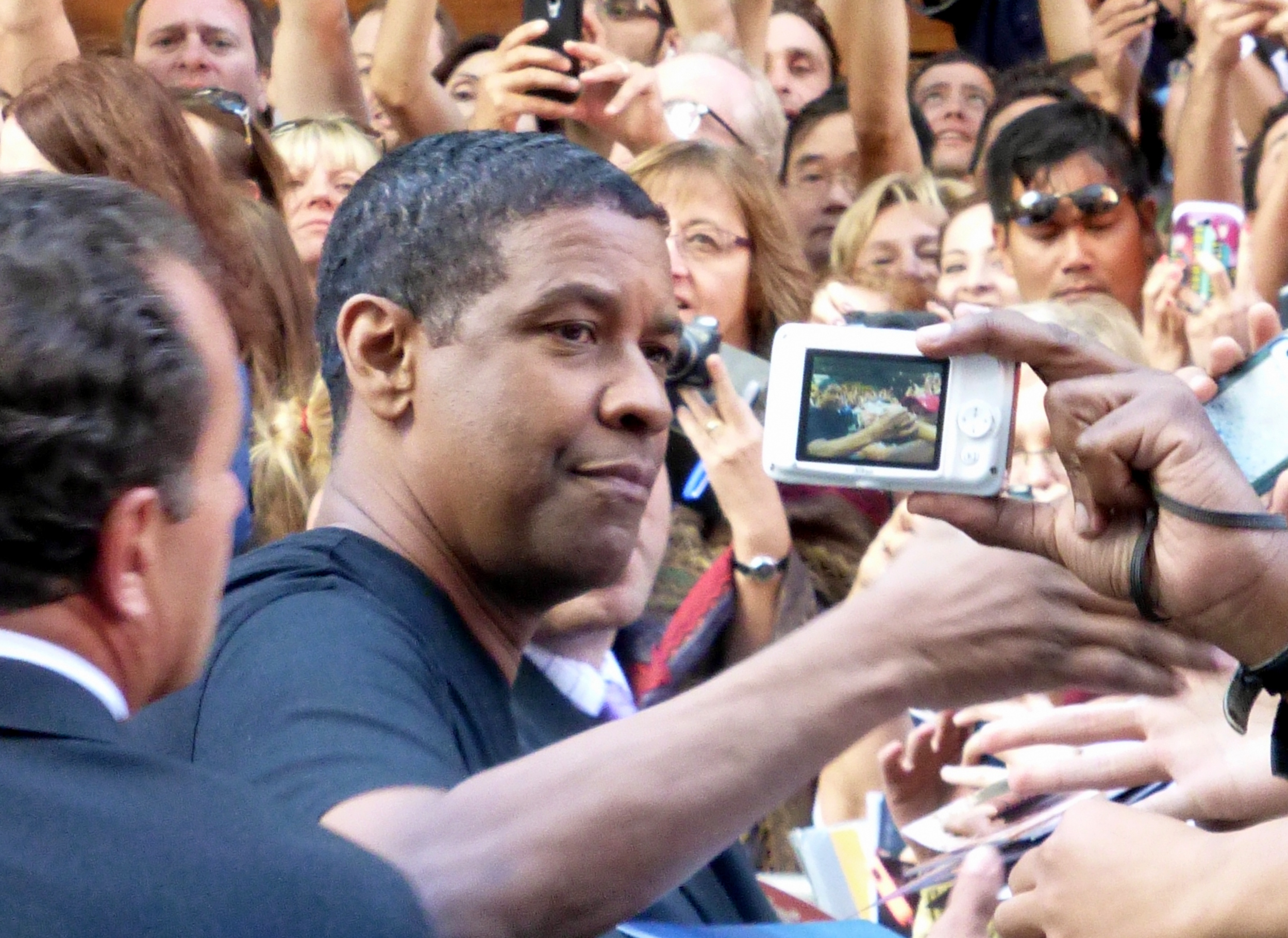
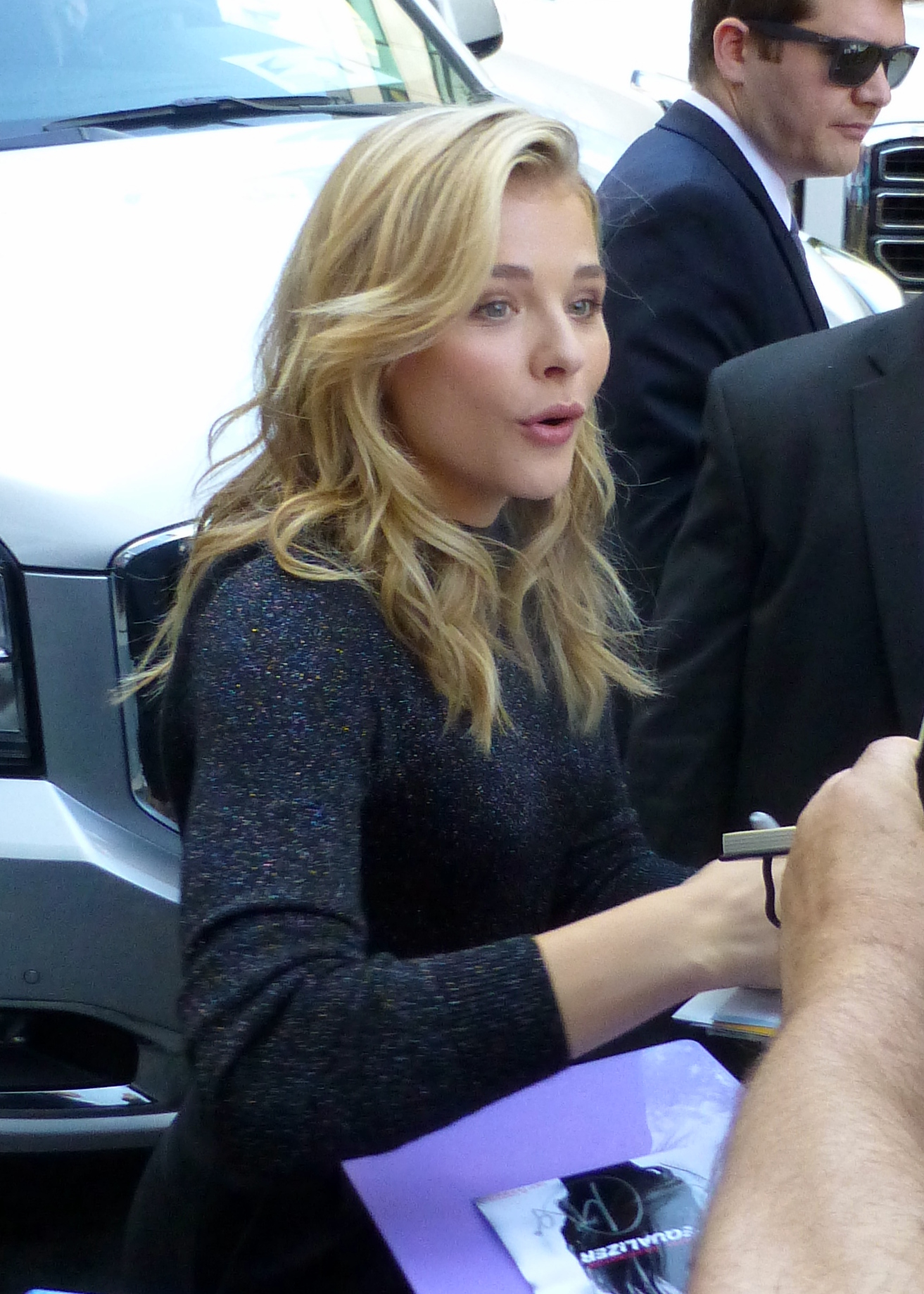
Denzel Washington and Chloë Grace Moretz promoting the film at the 2014 Toronto International Film Festival

=== Promotion and marketing ===
The first official image from the film was released on December 6, 2013. On August 6, 2012, Sony had originally planned on an April 11, 2014 release date, but on July 5, 2013, the released date pushed back to September 26, 2014. The first official poster for the film was released on April 16, 2014. On April 22, USA Today revealed photos from the film. On May 24, the trailer for the film was released. On June 12, another official trailer for the film was released. On July 16, the IMAX poster for the film was released.

Innovative marketing tactics were employed for the film's promotion, including placing a viral ad in The New York Times Sunday classifieds, generating buzz and intrigue among potential viewers. Denzel Washington's commanding presence in the lead role was a key factor in drawing audiences, with his portrayal serving as a major selling point in promotional materials.

Social media campaigns and targeted advertising further bolstered anticipation for the film's release, engaging with audiences across various platforms. The release date shift from April to September allowed for a more strategic positioning, capitalizing on a less competitive market window and ultimately contributing to the film's box office success.

=== Theatrical release ===
The film's premiere was held at the 2014 Toronto International Film Festival on September 7, 2014. Sony released the film in theaters worldwide on September 26, 2014.

At the Toronto International Film Festival premiere, Denzel Washington and Chloe Grace Moretz captivated audiences with their dynamic performances, generating early excitement and positive reviews. Following its festival debut, The Equalizer received widespread acclaim, solidifying anticipation for its global theatrical release on September 26, 2014.

=== Home media ===
The Equalizer was released on Blu-ray and DVD on December 9, 2014, by Sony Pictures Home Entertainment. Later, it was released on Ultra HD Blu-ray on July 10, 2018, 10 days before the sequel was released in theaters.

== Reception ==
=== Box office ===
The Equalizer grossed $102 million in North America and $91 million in other territories for a worldwide gross of $193 million. Its net production budget was estimated between $55 million and $73 million.

The film was released on September 26, 2014, in the United States and earned $12.5 million from 3,236 theaters in its first opening night, including the $1.45 million it earned from 2,693 screens from Thursday night showings. On the second day, the film earned $13.5 million and $8.1 million on the third day. Its opening day is the third biggest for Washington, trailing behind American Gangster ($15.8 million) and Safe House ($13.6 million).

On its opening weekend the film earned $34.1 million ($10,816 per theater) and debuted at number one at the box office. The film broke several records at the box office during its opening weekend including the biggest R-rated debut of September, surpassing Jackass Number Two record ($29 million), the biggest IMAX opener of September, the biggest debut weekend gross for Antoine surpassing Olympus Has Fallen ($30 million), the fifth biggest domestic opening for Washington behind the aforementioned American Gangster ($43.6 million), Safe House ($40.2 million), and eventually behind its sequel The Equalizer 2 ($35.8 million) and The Magnificent Seven ($35.7 million). It was also the fourth biggest for a film released in September. It earned $3.3 million from 352 IMAX theaters. Audiences for the debut weekend of the film were 52% male and 48% female, with 65% of ticket buyers over 30 years old.

The Equalizer earned $17.8 million overseas from 65 territories from 4,500 screens during its opening weekend with $1.4 million of the gross coming from 137 IMAX theaters. The film broke several September openings record in various territories including the UK, Netherlands, Israel and Egypt. Top openings include the UK ($2.9 million), Russia ($2.7 million), Mexico ($1.4 million), Brazil ($1.3 million) United Arab Emirates ($875,000) and Malaysia ($650,000). Showings from Village Roadshow markets grossed an estimate $2.4 million with top openings including Australia ($1.9 million), New Zealand ($180,000) and Singapore ($300,000).

=== Critical response ===
On review aggregator Rotten Tomatoes, The Equalizer has an approval rating of 61% based on 205 reviews, with an average rating of 5.7/10. The site's critical consensus reads: "The Equalizer is more stylishly violent than meaningful, but with Antoine Fuqua behind the cameras and Denzel Washington dispensing justice, it delivers." At Metacritic, which assigns a weighted average rating, the film received an average score of 57 out of 100, based on 41 critics, indicating "mixed or average reviews". Audiences polled by CinemaScore gave the film an average grade of "A−" on a scale ranging from A+ to F.

Writing for RogerEbert.com, Susan Wloszczyna gave the film three out of four stars, stating: "If The Equalizer lacks gravitas, it is fairly sturdy as far as pure entertainment goes ... And this film acts as an origin story with an ending that suggests a new franchise is afoot." Common Sense Media gave an expert review of 3 star rating with parents and kids giving an average of 4 stars. James Berardinelli of ReelViews gave the film three out of four stars, positively commenting on the pacing, further describing that it is "in no hurry to rush into things". For The Globe and Mail, Liam Lacey gave a two-and-a-half stars out of four, welcoming the idea of sequels to The Equalizer, "just to watch Denzel finding new ways of getting even."

Geoffrey Macnab for The Independent favorably compared the film to Washington's films with the late Tony Scott. However, Macnab criticized the plot, claiming that it "makes no sense whatsoever". He rated the film three stars out of five.

== Sequels ==
On February 24, 2014, seven months before the release of the film, it was announced that Sony Pictures and Escape Artists were planning a sequel, with Richard Wenk penning the script. In early October 2014, Fuqua said in an interview that there would be a sequel to the film only if audiences and Denzel Washington wanted it. He stated McCall was an interesting character and that the sequel could have more of an international flavor with room for more "development and evolution." On April 22, 2015, Sony announced that a sequel would be made.

In July 2017, Columbia Pictures announced that a portion of the filming would take place in the Brant Rock area of Marshfield, which took place over two weeks in November 2017. The Equalizer 2 was released in the U.S. on July 20, 2018.

In August 2018, Fuqua announced his plans to continue the film series. The filmmaker expressed interest in the plot taking place in an international setting.

By January 2022, a third film was officially confirmed to be in development, with Denzel Washington and Fuqua returning. Principal photography was scheduled to commence in 2022. In June 2022, Dakota Fanning was cast in a supporting role. Written by Richard Wenk, the movie was produced by Todd Black, Jason Blumenthal, Steve Tisch and Denzel Washington. The project is a co-production between Sony Pictures, and Escape Artists Productions. The film was released theatrically on September 1, 2023.
