= Tim Smith =

Tim, Timothy or Timmy Smith may refer to:

== Musicians ==
- T. V. Smith (born 1956), British singer and songwriter
- Tim Smith (Cardiacs) (1961–2020), English singer-songwriter and frontman of Cardiacs
  - "Tim Smith", a 2009 song by the Wildhearts from ¡Chutzpah!
- Timmy Trumpet (born 1982), Australian DJ and producer
- Tim Smith, lead singer of Midlake
- Tim Smith, drummer with Poco
- Tim Smith, bass guitarist of The Brew

== Politics ==
- Tim Smith (British politician) (born 1947), former House of Commons politician
- Timothy Smith (American politician) (born 1980), New Hampshire House of Representatives politician
- Tim Smith (Australian politician) (born 1983), Victorian Legislative Assembly politician

== Sports ==
- Timothy Smith (cricketer, born 1953), English cricketer
- Tim Smith (wide receiver) (born 1957), American football wide receiver
- Tim Smith (defensive tackle) (born 2002), American football defensive tackle
- Timmy Smith (born 1964), American football running back
- Tim Smith (ice hockey) (born 1981), Canadian ice hockey player
- Tim Smith (basketball) (born 1982), American professional basketball player
- Timothy Smith (cricketer, born 1983), English cricketer
- Tim Smith (rugby league) (born 1985), Australian rugby league player
- Tim Smith (baseball) (born 1986), Canadian baseball player
- Tim Smith (Australian footballer) (born 1991), Australian rules footballer for Melbourne

== Other people ==
- Tim J. Smith (born 1955), British business executive and government adviser
- Timothy L. Smith (1924–1997), religious historian
- Timothy Dudley-Smith (born Timothy Smith, 1926–2024), English bishop
- Timothy Smith (psychologist) (fl. 1970s–2020s), American psychologist
- Tim Smith (DJ) (born 1961), presenter on BBC Radio 2
- Tim Smith (journalist) (fl. 2000s), music editor of the Baltimore Sun
- Timothy John Smith (actor) (fl. 2000s–2010s), American actor
- Timothy D'Arch Smith (born 1936), British author and bookseller

== Fictional ==
- Tim Smith (One Tree Hill), a character on One Tree Hill portrayed by Brett Claywell
