= Mills Watson =

American actor

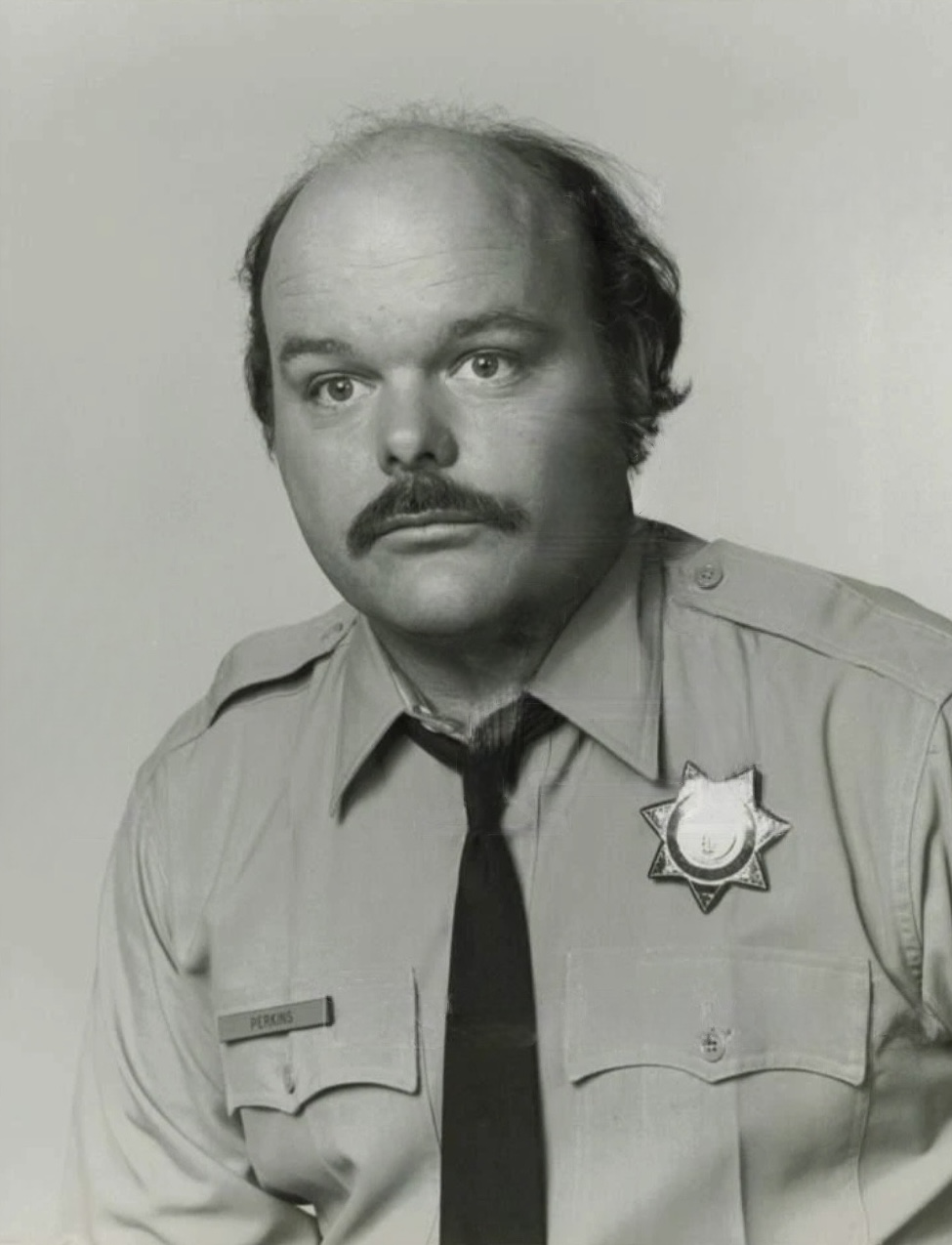
- Watson in The Misadventures of Sheriff Lobo, 1981
- Born: William Oscar Watson; July 10, 1940 (age 86); Oakland, California, U.S.
- Occupation: Actor
- Years active: 1968–1992
- Spouse(s): Caroline Mary Mason (m. 1968; div. 1970) Sue (?-present)

Mills Watson (born William Oscar Watson on July 10, 1940) is a retired American actor who is probably best known for his comedic portrayal of the law enforcement character Deputy Perkins, first on B. J. and the Bear and later as a series star on The Misadventures of Sheriff Lobo. He played Uncle Buster in the sitcom Harper Valley P.T.A..

== Personal life ==
Watson was born in Oakland, California and grew up on a ranch near Stockton. His father was a sheep rancher and his mother a school teacher. His grandparents were from Texas. He attended Franklin Elementary School and graduated from Elk Grove High School in 1958. His family did not have a television during his childhood and like most families of that era listened to the radio for news and entertainment. After high school he went to San Francisco State University for two semesters where he studied acting for a short time under Victor French.

After appearing in a small independent film, he wanted to pursue more formal acting training and he applied to and was accepted as a student at the Royal Academy of Dramatic Art in London, where he acquired much stage experience. Says Watson, "I figured if I got in, I wouldn't have any excuse to fail on a training level. I could never say I didn't get the right kind of training, because this was the best in the world." Returning from England, he moved to Los Angeles and began appearing in television shows and movies, eventually retiring from acting in the early 1990s.

During the 1970s, he raised a son, Mason, as a single parent, with the help of neighbors and professionals when he was at work acting.

He now resides in Marcola, Oregon, where he lives on a 15-acre farm with his second wife Sue. When asked in an interview if he missed acting, he replied: "No. I was very fortunate to have been able to do as much as I wanted. I did enough of that. Today I have a fifteen-acre farm, growing hay. I just relax here with Sue. There's no pressure up here in Oregon. It's safe and it's not stressful at all, which I feel is keeping me alive."

== Career ==
Watson appeared in guest roles in numerous TV series such as Gunsmoke, Mission:Impossible, Hawaii Five-O, Emergency!, McCloud, M*A*S*H, The Rockford Files, The A-Team, CHiPs, The Fall Guy, and Murder She Wrote, Black Sheep Squadron, The Six Million Dollar Man, as well as movies including ...tick...tick...tick... (1970), The Wild Country (1970), Dirty Little Billy (1972), Charley and the Angel (1973), Papillon (1973), The Midnight Man (1974), Treasure of Matecumbe (1976), Up In Smoke (1978), Cujo, (1979) CHiPs, episode “Rustling” as Ambrose (1978) and "Repo Man" as Doyle Ware (1983), and Bulletproof (1988). He also had a part in the TV miniseries War and Remembrance (1988), which he filmed in Hawaii. His last role was in the 1992 television film Gunsmoke: To the Last Man.

The acting role he considers his personal favorite and most fun was as Deputy Perkins on B.J. and the Bear and The Misadventures of Sheriff Lobo. He appeared on the March 22–28, 1980 cover of TV Guide as the character along with co-stars Claude Akins and Brian Kerwin.

== Filmography ==
Year	Title	Role	Notes
1968	Mod Squad	Ken Lacey	Episode "Find Tara Chapman!"
1968	Ride a Northbound Horse	Bridge Bandit No. 1	
1970	...tick...tick...tick...	Joe Warren	
1971	Bonanza	Fontaine	Episode "The iron butterfly"
1970	The Wild Country	Feathers	
1972	Dirty Little Billy	Ed	
1973	M*A*S*H	Sgt. Condon	Episode "Dear Dad...Three"
1973	Charley and the Angel	Frankie Zuto	
1973	The Mystery in Dracula's Castle	Noah Baxter	
1973	Papillon	Guard	
1974	The Waltons	Blake	
1974	The Midnight Man	Cash	
1975	Police Story	D. D. Rodriquez	Episode “Breaking Point”
1975	The Rockford Files	Mr. Moss	Episode "Roundabout"
1976	Treasure of Matecumbe	Catrell	
1977	The Streets of San Francisco	Arthur Devoe	Episode "A Good Cop ... But"
1977	The Six Million Dollar Man	Edgar Webster	
1977	The Six Million Dollar Man	Lazarus	
1978	The Incredible Hulk	Sheriff Dobson	Episode "Death in the Family"
1978	Up in Smoke	Harry	
1978	The Rockford Files	Stan Collier	Episode “The Gang at Don’s Drive-In”
1978	CHiPs	Ambrose	
1979	CHiPs	Doyle Ware	
1979	B. J. and the Bear	Deputy Perkins	
1979	The Misadventures of Sheriff Lobo	Deputy Perkins	
1983	Cujo	Gary Pervier	
1984	Cover Up		Episode "Murder In Malibu"
1985	Benson	Tiny	season 6 episode 14 "on the road"
1985	Heated Vengeance	Tucker	
1985	Yellow Pages	Billy O'Shea	
1985	Hunter		
1985	The Fall Guy	Myles Poplin	Episode "Spring Break"
1988	Bulletproof	Colby	
