= B. J. and the Bear =

American action comedy TV series

- Genre: Action comedy
- Created by: Glen A. Larson; Christopher Crowe
- Written by: Glen A. Larson; Michael Sloan; Frank Lupo; Tom Sawyer; Christopher Crowe; Sidney Ellis; Rick Kelbaugh; Richard Lindheim
- Directed by: Gil Bettman; Bruce Bilson; Daniel Haller; Bruce Kessler; Christian I. Nyby II; Michael Preece; Charles R. Rondeau
- Starring: Greg Evigan; Claude Akins; Mills Watson; Brian Kerwin; Dennis Burkley
- Theme music composer: Glen A. Larson
- Opening theme: "B.J. and the Bear"
- Composers: William Broughton; Stu Phillips
- Country of origin: United States
- Original language: English
- No. of seasons: 3
- No. of episodes: 46

Production
- Executive producers: Glen A. Larson; Michael Sloan
- Producers: Lester Wm. Berke; Joe Boston; Richard Lindheim; Robert F. O'Neill
- Cinematography: Frank Beascoechea; Charles Mills; Frank Thackery
- Running time: 45–48 minutes
- Production companies: Universal Television; Glen A. Larson Productions

Original release
- Network: NBC
- Release: February 10, 1979 – May 9, 1981

Related
- The Misadventures of Sheriff Lobo

B. J. and the Bear is an American action comedy television series which aired on NBC from February 10, 1979, to May 9, 1981. Created by Glen A. Larson and Christopher Crowe, the series starred Greg Evigan. The series was produced when the CB radio and trucking craze had peaked in the United States.

The theme song, also titled "B.J. and the Bear", was written by Larson and performed by Evigan.

== Premise and storylines ==
Greg Evigan stars as Billie Joe "B.J." McKay, a professional freelance itinerant trucker who travels the country's highways in a red and white Kenworth K-100 Aerodyne (a COE semi truck) with his pet chimpanzee Bear, named after Bear Bryant, the famed football coach for the University of Alabama. In the pilot movie, it is stated that McKay had spent two years in Vietnam as a medical helicopter pilot, had been a captain and earned the Distinguished Service Cross. He was a prisoner of war in North Vietnam at the Hanoi Hilton for four months in 1973 after his helicopter went down over the DMZ. Episodes typically deal with B.J. uncovering or getting mixed up with crime in the area he is traveling through, and a local resident—usually, a young, beautiful woman—appealing to him for help.

A frequent guest star in the first season is Sheriff Elroy P. Lobo (Claude Akins, who previously starred in the trucking series Movin' On), whose character eventually spun off onto his own show The Misadventures of Sheriff Lobo along with guest character Alexander Waverly (Ben Cooper).

Two episodes in season two, "Eyes of Texas" (1979) and "The Girls on the Hollywood High" (1980), were designed as prospective pilots for a series about a pair of private detectives called Heather Fern (Rebecca Reynolds) and Caroline Capodi (Lorrie Mahaffey in the first one, Heather Thomas in the second). The latter episode has cameo appearances from John S. Ragin and Robert Ito as their characters from Quincy, M.E. (also a Glen A. Larson series).

In 1981, when the show returned for its third season with the two-part episode "B.J. and the Seven Lady Truckers", (Note: Not to be confused with the season two opener "Snow White and the Seven Lady Truckers", also a two-parter.) B.J. has settled down to run Bear Enterprises, a trucking company based in Los Angeles. His nemesis is Rutherford T. Grant (Murray Hamilton), the corrupt head of the state's Special Crimes Action Team, who is a secret partner in a competing trucking company. Because of Grant's harassment, B.J. is unable to hire experienced truckers, and is forced to hire seven beautiful young female truckers, consisting of Grant's daughter Cindy (Sherilyn Wolter), twins Teri and Geri (Candi and Randi Brough), no-nonsense Angie (Sheila Wills), Samantha (Amanda Horan Kennedy), Callie (Linda McCullough), and a busty blonde nicknamed "Stacks" (Judy Landers), along with a female dispatcher, Stacy (Susan Woollen).

Though Universal has never released B. J. and the Bear on home video, bootleg editions are available on DVD.

== Episodes ==
=== Pilot (1978) ===
Title	Directed by	Written by	Original release date
"The Foundlings"	Bruce Bilson	Glen A. Larson & Christopher Crowe	October 4, 1978

=== Season 1 (1979) ===
No. overall	No. in season	Title	Directed by	Written by	Original release date
1	1	"Odyssey of the Shady Truth"	Christian I. Nyby II	T : Michael Sloan; S/T : Kenneth Realman	February 10, 1979
2	2	"Shine On"	Christian I. Nyby II	Chris Lucky & Frank Lupo	February 24, 1979
3	3	"A Coffin with a View"	Ray Austin	Michael Sloan	March 10, 1979
4	4	"Deadly Cargo"	Cliff Bole	Michael Sloan	March 17, 1979
5	5	"Never Give a Trucker an Even Break"	Christian I. Nyby II	S : Richard Lindheim; S/T : Frank Lupo	March 24, 1979
6	6	"Lobo's Revenge"	Bruce Bilson	S : Glen A. Larson & Richard Lindheim; S/T : Michael Sloan	April 7, 1979
7	7	"The Murphy Contingent"	Rod Holcomb	Frank Lupo & C. R. O. Christopher	April 14, 1979
8	8	"Wheels of Fortune"	Bruce Bilson	Glen A. Larson	April 21, 1979
9	9	"Crackers"	Michael Caffey	S : Glen A. Larson; S/T : Michael Sloan	April 28, 1979
10	10	"Lobo"	Bruce Bilson	S : Michael Sloan; S/T : Glen A. Larson	May 5, 1979

=== Season 2 (1979–80) ===
No. overall	No. in season	Title	Directed by	Written by	Original release date
11	1	"Snow White and the Seven Lady Truckers: Part 1"	Christian I. Nyby II	S : Glen A. Larson; S/T : Michael Sloan	September 29, 1979
Guest stars Sonia Manzano, and Andre the Giant.
12	2	"Snow White and the Seven Lady Truckers: Part 2"	Christian I. Nyby II	S : Glen A. Larson; S/T : Michael Sloan	October 6, 1979
Guest star Sonia Manzano
13	3	"Cain's Cruiser"	Charles R. Rondeau	Robert L. McCullough	October 13, 1979
14	4	"Pogo Lil"	Bernard McEveety	Richard Kelbaugh	October 20, 1979
15	5	"Cain's Son-in-Law"	Charles R. Rondeau	Frank Lupo	October 27, 1979
16	6	"Run for the Money: Part 1"	Bruce Bilson	S : Glen A. Larson & John Peyser; T : Michael Sloan; S/T : Sidney Ellis, Frank Lupo & Robert L. McCullough	November 3, 1979
Crossover story with The Misadventures of Sheriff Lobo.
17	7	"The Eyes of Texas"	Bruce Bilson	Glen A. Larson	November 10, 1979
18	8	"Mary Ellen"	Frank Beascoechea	T : Sidney Ellis & Michael Sloan; S/T : Jimmy Sangster	November 17, 1979
19	9	"Gasohol"	Charles R. Rondeau	S : Richard Bluel & Pat Fielder; T : Robert L. McCullough	November 24, 1979
20	10	"B.J.'s Sweethearts"	Jeff Gold	Michael Sloan	December 1, 1979
21	11	"Fly a Wild Horse"	Christian I. Nyby II	Richard Kelbaugh	December 8, 1979
22	12	"Silent Night, Unholy Night"	Vince Edwards	Michael Sloan	December 15, 1979
23	13	"Fire in the Hole"	Bruce Kessler	S : Richard Kelbaugh; T : Sidney Ellis	January 12, 1980
24	14	"Siege"	Michael Preece	S : Glen A. Larson; S/T : Michael Sloan	January 19, 1980
25	15	"Through the Past, Darkly"	Charles R. Rondeau	S : Steven C. Kurzfeld, Glen A. Larson & Chris Lucky; T : Robert L. McCullough; S/T : Frank Lupo	January 26, 1980
26	16	"Bear Bondage"	Bruce Kessler	S : Richard Lindheim; T : Frank Lupo & Robert L. McCullough	February 2, 1980
27	17	"B.J. and the Witch"	Charles R. Rondeau	Sidney Ellis	February 9, 1980
28	18	"The Good, the Bad and the Beautiful"	Christian I. Nyby II	Robert L. McCullough	February 16, 1980
29	19	"The Girls on the Hollywood High"	Bruce Bilson	S : Ron Friedman; S/T : Glen A. Larson	February 23, 1980
30	20	"The 18-Wheel Rip-Off"	Gil Bettman	S : Sidney Ellis; S/T : Michael Sloan	March 22, 1980
31	21	"The Friendly Double Cross"	Keith Atkinson	S : Frank Lupo; T : Robert L. McCullough	March 29, 1980

=== Season 3 (1981) ===
No. overall	No. in season	Title	Directed by	Written by	Original release date
32	1	"B.J. and the Seven Lady Truckers: Parts 1 & 2"	Christian I. Nyby II	Michael Sloan	January 13, 1981
33	2	"B.J. and the Seven Lady Truckers: Parts 1 & 2"	Christian I. Nyby II	Michael Sloan	January 13, 1981
34	3	"The Fast and the Furious: Part 1"	Christian I. Nyby II	Robert L. McCullough	January 20, 1981
35	4	"The Fast and the Furious: Part 2"	Christian I. Nyby II	Michael Halperin	January 27, 1981
36	5	"Intercepted Pass"	Georg Fenady	Rogers Turrentine	February 3, 1981
37	6	"Down & Dirty"	Michael Preece	Rogers Turrentine	February 10, 1981
38	7	"Beauties and the Beasts"	Christian I. Nyby II	Story by : Ken Pettus; Teleplay by : Robert L. McCullough & Tom Sawyer & Michael Halperin & Richard Christian Matheson & Thomas E. Szollosi	February 17, 1981
39	8	"Blond in a Gilded Cell"	Christian I. Nyby II	Robert L. McCullough	March 3, 1981
40	9	"For Adults Only"	Daniel Haller	Tom Sawyer	March 10, 1981
41	10	"A Bear in the Hand"	Christian I. Nyby II	Michael Halperin	March 17, 1981
42	11	"Seven Lady Captives"	Christian I. Nyby II	Tom Sawyer	March 24, 1981
43	12	"S.T.U.N.T."	Daniel Haller	Story by : Michael Sloan & Richard Lindheim; Teleplay by : Michael Sloan	March 31, 1981
44	13	"Who Is B.J.?"	Peter Crane	Michael Sloan	April 25, 1981
45	14	"Detective Finger, I Presume"	Gil Bettman	Robert L. McCullough	May 2, 1981
46	15	"The Two Million Dollar Hustle"	David Phinney	Story by : Tom Sawyer; Teleplay by : Tom Sawyer & Robert L. McCullough & Michael Halperin	May 9, 1981
