= List of The Equalizer (1985 TV series) episodes =

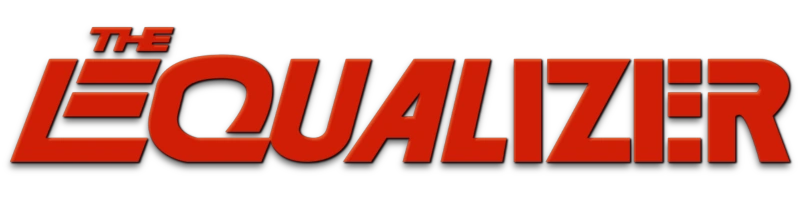

The following is an episode list of the 1980s CBS, cult classic vigilante series, The Equalizer.

== Series overview ==
Season	Episodes	Originally released	
Season	Episodes	First released	Last released
1	22	September 18, 1985	April 8, 1986
2	22	October 8, 1986	May 27, 1987
3	22	September 23, 1987	May 4, 1988
4	22	October 26, 1988	August 24, 1989

== Episodes ==
=== Season 1 (1985–86) ===
No. overall	No. in season	Title	Directed by	Written by	Original release date	Prod. code	Rating/share (households)
1	1	"The Equalizer" "Pilot"	Rod Holcomb	Michael Sloan	September 18, 1985	83517	18.3/32
2	2	"China Rain"	Richard Compton	Story by : Victor Hsu; Teleplay by : Joel Surnow & Maurice Hurley & Victor Hsu	September 25, 1985	61204	14.3/23
3	3	"The Defector"	Rod Holcomb	Heywood Gould	October 2, 1985	61213	12.1/20
4	4	"The Lock Box"	Russ Mayberry	Story by : Frank Military; Teleplay by : Frank Military & Joel Surnow & Maurice Hurley	October 9, 1985	61216	15.0/25
5	5	"Lady Cop"	Russ Mayberry	Story by : Kathryn Bigelow & Maurice Hurley & Joel Surnow; Teleplay by : Maurice Hurley & Joel Surnow	October 16, 1985	61208	14.4/23
6	6	"The Confirmation Day"	Richard Colla	Story by : Eric Blakeney & Gene Miller; Teleplay by : Edward Adler & Heywood Gould	October 23, 1985	61205	12.9/21
7	7	"The Children's Song"	Richard Compton	Story by : Howard Chesley; Teleplay by : Howard Chesley & Maurice Hurley & Joel Surnow	October 30, 1985	61203	14.0/24
8	8	"The Distant Fire"	Alan Metzger	Story by : Robert Sabaroff; Teleplay by : Robert Sabaroff & Maurice Hurley & Joel Surnow	November 6, 1985	61201	11.8/18
9	9	"Mama's Boy"	James Sheldon	Heywood Gould	November 13, 1985	61219	13.5/21
10	10	"Bump and Run"	Richard Compton	Story by : Jim Trombetta; Teleplay by : Maurice Hurley & Joel Surnow	November 20, 1985	61214	11.8/19
11	11	"Desperately"	Donald Petrie	Charles Grant Craig	December 4, 1985	61221	12.4/20
12	12	"Reign of Terror"	Richard Compton	Story by : Steve Bello; Teleplay by : Steve Bello & Coleman Luck	December 11, 1985	61220	13.2/22
13	13	"Back Home"	Alan Metzger	Story by : Neil Cohen; Teleplay by : Joel Surnow & Maurice Hurley	December 18, 1985	61209	13.6/23
14	14	"Out of the Past"	Richard Compton	Cyrus Nowrasteh	January 15, 1986	61224	12.2/20
15	15	"Dead Drop"	Donald Petrie	Maurice Hurley & Joel Surnow	January 22, 1986	61230	13.3/22
16	16	"Wash Up"	Richard Compton	Mark Frost	January 29, 1986	61228	11.9/20
17	17	"Torn"	Russ Mayberry	Story by : Joel Surnow & Maurice Hurley; Teleplay by : Carl Eastlake	February 5, 1986	61211	11.9/20
18	18	"Unnatural Causes"	Alan Metzger	Story by : Susan Woollen; Teleplay by : Susan Woollen & Coleman Luck & Scott Shepherd	February 12, 1986	61233	11.7/19
19	19	"Breakpoint"	Russ Mayberry	Story by : Scott Shepherd; Teleplay by : Scott Shepherd & Don Carlos Dunaway	February 19, 1986	61226	13.2/22
20	20	"No Conscience"	Richard Compton	Mark Frost	March 26, 1986	61231	10.6/20
21	21	"Unpunished Crimes"	Alan Metzger	John Burke & Grenville Case	April 1, 1986	61227	11.1/20
22	22	"Pretenders"	Richard Compton	Scott Shepherd	April 8, 1986	61234	10.8/20

=== Season 2 (1986–87) ===
No. overall	No. in season	Title	Directed by	Written by	Original release date	Rating/share (households)
23	1	"Prelude"	Richard Compton	Carleton Eastlake	October 8, 1986	17.0/28
24	2	"Nocturne"	Richard Compton	Carleton Eastlake	October 15, 1986	17.5/28
25	3	"A Community of Civilized Men"	Alan Metzger	Daniel Pyne & Scott Shepherd	October 22, 1986	12.9/21
26	4	"Joyride"	Russ Mayberry	Jim Trombetta & Charles Grant Craig	October 29, 1986	14.4/26
27	5	"Shades of Darkness"	Donald Petrie	Jack V. Fogarty	November 5, 1986	14.1/24
28	6	"Nightscape"	Aaron Lipstadt	Carleton Eastlake	November 12, 1986	15.7/27
29	7	"Counterfire"	Alan Metzger	Scott Shepherd & Coleman Luck	November 19, 1986	16.0/26
30	8	"The Line"	Russ Mayberry	Steve Volpe	November 26, 1986	15.9/28
31	9	"Tip on a Sure Thing"	Donald Petrie	Scott Shepherd	December 3, 1986	16.2/27
32	10	"The Cup"	Mario DiLeo	Story by : Andrew Sipes & Carleton Eastlake; Teleplay by : David Jackson & Carleton Eastlake	December 10, 1986	16.4/27
33	11	"Heartstrings"	Russ Mayberry	Loraine Despres	December 17, 1986	15.4/25
34	12	"High Performance"	Russ Mayberry	Jack V. Fogarty	January 7, 1987	17.3/29
35	13	"Beyond Control"	Alan Metzger	Coleman Luck	January 14, 1987	15.4/26
36	14	"Carnal Persuasion"	Leon Ichaso	Dennis Manuel	January 21, 1987	15.5/25
37	15	"Memories of Manon"	Tony Wharmby	Coleman Luck	February 4, 1987	15.0/25
38	16	"Memories of Manon"	Tony Wharmby	Coleman Luck	February 11, 1987	15.2/25
39	17	"Solo"	Alan Metzger	Carleton Eastlake	February 18, 1987	15.8/26
40	18	"A Place to Stay"	Alan Metzger	Story by : Marc Rubin; Teleplay by : Marc Rubin & Carleton Eastlake & Coleman Luck	February 25, 1987	18.5/30
41	19	"Coal Black Soul"	Richard Compton	Scott Shepherd	May 6, 1987	14.6/27
42	20	"First Light"	Richard Compton	Jack Fogarty	May 13, 1987	15.7/28
43	21	"Hand and Glove"	Alan Metzger	Coleman Luck	May 20, 1987	12.7/22
44	22	"Re-Entry"	Aaron Lipstadt	Story by : Dennis Manuel; Teleplay by : Scott Shepherd	May 27, 1987	13.4/23

=== Season 3 (1987–88) ===
No. overall	No. in season	Title	Directed by	Written by	Original release date	Rating/share (households)
45	1	"Blood and Wine"	Alan Metzger	Coleman Luck	September 23, 1987	14.4/24
46	2	"Blood and Wine"	Alan Metzger	Coleman Luck	September 23, 1987	14.4/24
47	3	"Suspicion of Innocence"	Russ Mayberry	Robert Eisele	September 30, 1987	14.0/24
48	4	"In the Money"	Aaron Lipstadt	Ed Waters & Scott Shepherd	October 7, 1987	14.2/24
49	5	"Encounter in a Closed Room"	Jim Johnston	Story by : Ann Lewis Hamilton & Scott Shepherd; Teleplay by : Ann Lewis Hamilton	October 14, 1987	12.7/22
50	6	"Mission: McCall"	Alan Metzger	Ed Waters & Scott Shepherd	October 28, 1987	13.4/24
51	7	"Mission: McCall"	Alan Metzger	Story by : Ed Waters & Coleman Luck; Teleplay by : Ed Waters & Scott Shepherd & Robert Eisele	November 4, 1987	13.1/23
52	8	"Shadow Play"	Russ Mayberry	Robert Eisele	November 11, 1987	12.8/21
53	9	"Inner View"	Marc Laub	Jim Trombetta	November 18, 1987	13.2/24
54	10	"The Rehearsal"	Alan Metzger	Robert Eisele	December 2, 1987	9.9/17
55	11	"Christmas Presence"	Michael O'Herlihy	Coleman Luck	December 16, 1987	13.4/24
56	12	"A Dance on the Dark Side"	Jonathan Perry	David Lightstone	January 13, 1988	12.2/21
57	13	"The Child Broker"	Mark Sobel	Mick Curran	January 20, 1988	13.9/24
58	14	"Video Games"	James A. Contner	Peter McCabe	January 27, 1988	13.4/24
59	15	"Something Green"	Luis Soto	Kevin Droney	February 10, 1988	11.9/20
60	16	"The Mystery of Manon"	Bradford May	Coleman Luck	February 17, 1988	11.9/19
61	17	"The Mystery of Manon"	Bradford May	Coleman Luck	February 24, 1988	9.3/17
62	18	"No Place Like Home"	Tobe Hooper	Robert Eisele	March 16, 1988	13.5/24
63	19	"Last Call"	Michael O'Herlihy	Robert Crais	March 23, 1988	13.2/24
64	20	"Regrets Only"	James A. Contner	Robert Crais	March 30, 1988	14.0/25
65	21	"Target of Choice"	Mark Sobel	Kevin Droney	April 6, 1988	14.2/24
66	22	"Always a Lady"	Marc Laub	Story by : Scott Shepherd; Teleplay by : Peter McCabe	May 4, 1988	11.9/21

=== Season 4 (1988–89) ===
No. overall	No. in season	Title	Directed by	Written by	Original release date	U.S. viewers (millions)	Rating/share (households)
67	1	"The Last Campaign"	Richard Compton	Lee Batchler & Janet Scott Batchler	October 26, 1988	17.0	11.9/18
68	2	"Sea of Fire"	Alan Metzger	Story by : Peter McCabe; Teleplay by : Peter McCabe & Coleman Luck	November 2, 1988	16.1	11.7/18
69	3	"Riding the Elephant"	Donald Petrie	M.K. Lorens	November 9, 1988	14.7	10.6/16
70	4	"Eighteen with a Bullet"	Richard Compton	Bruce A. Taylor	November 16, 1988	16.3	11.4/17
71	5	"Day of the Covenant"	James A. Contner	Robert Eisele	December 7, 1988	11.0	7.7/12
72	6	"Splinters"	Paul Krasny	Coleman Luck	December 14, 1988	15.1	10.8/17
73	7	"Making of a Martyr"	Bradford May	Wayne Powers & Donna Powers	January 11, 1989	16.0	11.3/18
74	8	"The Sins of Our Fathers"	Paul Krasny	Tom Towler	January 18, 1989	16.6	11.1/17
75	9	"The Visitation"	Bradford May	Robert Eisele	February 1, 1989	15.6	11.0/17
76	10	"Past Imperfect"	Russ Mayberry	Gail Morgan Hickman	February 15, 1989	17.2	11.9/19
77	11	"Trial by Ordeal"	Marc Laub	Coleman Luck	March 1, 1989	13.9	9.8/16
78	12	"Silent Fury"	Russ Mayberry	Donna Powers & Wayne Powers	March 8, 1989	14.4	10.0/16
79	13	"Lullaby of Darkness"	David Jackson	Coleman Luck	March 30, 1989	16.9	11.9/19
80	14	"17 Zebra"	Alan Metzger	Jacqueline Zambrano	April 6, 1989	17.4	12.1/19
81	15	"Starfire"	Bradford May	Robert Eisele	April 13, 1989	16.7	11.7/19
82	16	"Time Present, Time Past"	Gordon Hessler	Tom Towler	April 20, 1989	15.1	10.8/18
83	17	"Prisoners of Conscience"	Marc Laub	Robert Eisele	April 27, 1989	14.7	10.4/17
84	18	"The Caper"	Alan Metzger	Tom Towler	May 4, 1989	15.0	10.8/17
85	19	"Heart of Justice"	Bradford May	Gail Morgan Hickman	May 11, 1989	14.6	11.2/18
86	20	"Race Traitors"	Robert E. Warren	Donna Powers, Wayne Powers, & Gail Morgan Hickman	June 29, 1989	11.6	8.3/16
87	21	"Endgame"	Alan Metzger	Coleman Luck	August 10, 1989	11.2	8.3/15
88	22	"Suicide Squad"	Marc Laub	Jacqueline Zambrano	August 24, 1989	11.2	8.2/15

== Home releases ==
At present, the following DVD sets have been released.

DVD set	Company	Release date
The Equalizer: Season 1	Universal Home Video	February 12, 2008
The Equalizer: The Complete Collection; Limited Edition	Visual Entertainment	August 19, 2014
The Equalizer: The Complete Season 2	Visual Entertainment	August 26, 2014
The Equalizer: The Complete Season 3	Visual Entertainment	October 24, 2014
The Equalizer: The Complete Season 4	Visual Entertainment	November 25, 2014
