= The Equalizer (1985 TV series) =

American television series (1985–1989)

- Genre: Action thriller; Crime drama; Mystery; Spy thriller; Vigilante
- Created by: Michael Sloan; Richard Lindheim
- Starring: Edward Woodward; Keith Szarabajka
- Opening theme: Stewart Copeland
- Country of origin: United States
- Original language: English
- No. of seasons: 4
- No. of episodes: 88 (list of episodes)

Production
- Executive producers: James Duff McAdams; Michael Sloan
- Producers: Dan Lieberstein; Marc Laub; Stuart Cohen; Alan Barnette; Mark Sobel; Edward Adler; Alan Metzger; Joe Boston
- Running time: 46–48 minutes
- Production company: Universal Television

Original release
- Network: CBS
- Release: September 18, 1985 – August 24, 1989

Related
- Season 1 · Season 2 · Season 3 · Season 4 The Equalizer (film) · The Equalizer 2 · The Equalizer 3 The Equalizer (2021 series)

The Equalizer is an American action crime drama television series, originally airing on CBS from September 18, 1985, to August 24, 1989, which was co-created by Michael Sloan and Richard Lindheim. It starred the English actor Edward Woodward as Robert McCall, a retired intelligence agent with a mysterious past, who uses the skills from his former career to exact justice on behalf of innocent people who find themselves in dangerous circumstances, while sometimes also dealing with people from his past in covert operations who want to pull him back in or settle old scores. In the years after its cancellation, the show has received a cult following that inspired further works, including three feature films and a re-imagined series.

== Series plot elements ==
The series stars British actor Edward Woodward as Robert McCall, a former covert operations officer of an unnamed American government intelligence organization, which was often referred to simply as "the Agency" or "the Company", who tries to atone for his past by offering, usually free of charge, his services as a troubleshooter, a protector, and an investigator.

People in need found him through a newspaper classified ad: "Got a problem? Odds against you? Call the Equalizer: 212 555 4200." When he began the business in the pilot episode, the nickname "Equalizer" was revealed as bestowed on him by an operative named "Brahms", played by Jerry Stiller.

Aided by a group of sometimes mysterious contacts, some of whom date back to his spying days, McCall traverses the streets of New York City, delivering justice upon bullies, corrupt police officials and politicians, hoodlums, mobsters, rapists, racists, murderers, kidnappers, drug dealers, and other "truly deserving" people. "Please don't do anything you will never live to regret," he tells one villain.

His contacts were also prone to human foibles that ranged from egoism to domestic problems.

Many episodes focused on McCall interacting with "Control" (played by Robert Lansing), the unnamed head of the Manhattan office of the secret organization for which McCall used to work. As a general rule, however, the people responding to the newspaper ad were unremarkable, average, and unknown.

McCall's Jaguar XJ saloon car, weapons, and other gadgetry at times featured significantly as elements in the plot.

== Cast and characters ==
=== Main ===
- Edward Woodward as Robert McCall: A veteran operative of The Company who becomes disillusioned with sacrificing ordinary people for the perceived greater good. He quits and takes out a newspaper advert offering his services to those who need it as The Equalizer. McCall himself is divorced, a "lost dad" long estranged from his son, Scott (William Zabka). Woodward was nominated for an Emmy for Outstanding Actor in a Drama Series four years in a row but never won, and was also nominated in 1986 and 1987 for the Golden Globe Award for Best Actor – Television Series Drama, winning in 1986.
- Keith Szarabajka as Michael "Mickey" Kostmayer (Also starring, 56 episodes): a former Navy SEAL, who was thrown in the brig for a crime he did not commit, until McCall cleared him and recommended he join The Company. He is often utilized to surveil suspects and protect clients and witnesses.

=== Recurring ===
- Robert Lansing as Control (29 episodes). A contemporary of McCall's in The Company who has risen to a senior rank; he and McCall are usually friendly, although at times Control's focus on the mission causes friction with McCall's desire to avoid collateral damage.
- Mark Margolis as Jimmy (16 episodes). Another Company veteran, Jimmy is an expert in surveillance, and McCall brings him in when high-tech bugs, wiretaps, tranquilizer guns, and such are required.
- William Zabka as Scott McCall (12 episodes). McCall's estranged son when the series begins, their relationship grows over the course of the series.
- Chad Redding as Sgt. Alice Shepard (10 episodes). An NYPD detective in the second through fourth seasons, who often assists McCall, recognizing that he can take action where she cannot. Redding appears ten times as Shephard, and once previously as Beth Mackie in season one before her new role.
- Richard Jordan as Harley Gage (10 episodes). Another disillusioned Company veteran, Gage was brought in by Richard Dyson (played by Robert Mitchum) to track down McCall when he goes missing in "Mission: McCall." This was done to lighten the load on Woodward after he suffered a heart attack.
- Maureen Anderman as Pete O'Phelan (8 episodes). The widow of McCall's former colleague and a former operative. Anderman had previously appeared as Eleanor Griffith in season one before her new role.
- Ron O'Neal as Lt. Isadore Smalls (7 episodes). An NYPD detective who assists McCall.
- Irving Metzman as Sterno (7 episodes). Another Company man, specializing in computers and finance.
- Steven Williams as Lt. Jefferson Burnett (6 episodes). An NYPD detective from the 83rd Precinct who is aware of McCall's past and is initially distrustful of him.
- Robert Joy as Jacob Stock (5 episodes). A Company operative who botches his first assignment with McCall, but manages to redeem himself in season one "The Defector."
- Ken Solarino as Jeremy (5 episodes). Pete O'Phelan's bartender.
- Eddie Jones as Lt. Brannigan (4 episodes). An NYPD detective. Jones had previously appeared as Mr. Winslow in season two before his new role.
- Melissa Sue Anderson as Yvette Marcel (4 episodes). The daughter of McCall's former lover Manon. Anderson is the real-life wife of series co-creator Michael Sloan.
- Christopher Murney as Rudy Bagler (3 episodes). An Agency reject, con-artist, and general nuisance.
- Joe Morton as Carter "Brockie" Brock (3 episodes). a Vietnam veteran and explosives expert. Morton had previously appeared as the villain Slate at the end of season two before his new role.
- Ray Baker as Dana Caldrin (3 episodes). An agent of The Company who occasionally aids McCall in his investigations. Jovial, generous and good-hearted, he is nonetheless an expert in the seedier side of New York life with a comprehensive knowledge of the city's sex industry. Dana is introduced in "The Lock Box" to save a teenage girl from trafficking. In "Desperately" he helps identify a hit-man. His last appearances is in "Dead Drop" as part of a team McCall uses to track suspects.
- Earl Hindman as Lt. Elmer (3 episodes). An NYPD detective at the 74th precinct in the second season. Starting with a brief appearance in the premiere episode "Prelude," his next appearances is in "The Cup," and last in "Coal Black Soul." Hindman had previously appeared as Findlay in "Breakpoint" in season one before his new role.
- Austin Pendleton as Jonah (3 episodes). A computer expert who helps McCall in seasons two and four. In season three, Jonah hacks "Ma Bell" off-screen; Pendleton does not actually appear in the episode.
- A. L. Sheppard as Detective Kelly (3 episodes). An NYPD detective in the fourth season. Sheppard previously appeared as an unnamed Forensic Detective in an earlier season four episode.
- Charles Cioffi as Lt. Kramer (3 episodes). An NYPD detective introduced in season two "Counterfire," and last seen in season three "Suspicion of Innocence."
- Yvonne Wilder as Lettie (3 episodes). McCall's housekeeper and mother of two boys, Jorge and Ishmael, who occasionally impact McCall's missions. Lettie is introduced in back-to-back season one episodes, "Wash Up" and "Torn," and last seen in season four, "The Sins of Our Fathers."
- Anthony Zerbe as Phillipe Marcel (3 episodes). A Canadian Police Inspector from Quebec and father to Yvette, who is the daughter of Manon, a Company agent and McCall's former lover. Phillipe is introduced in Memories of Manon, and is last see in season three, "The Mystery of Manon (Part 1)."
- Saul Rubinek as Jason Masur (3 episodes). A Company bureaucrat in season one who wants to push Control out of power and would like to "retire" McCall and other "old-guard" agents. He is introduced in "The Distant Fire" trying to capture a former operative who has turned freelance. McCall interferes, so Masur wants him taken out. When a subordinate protests, Masur declares, "There is no 'They,' I am the 'They.' To hell with Control." Masur returns in "Dead Drop" where he threatens to fire all of McCall's Company contacts. Later in "Torn," Masur hires McCall to capture an agent named Brian, who betrayed him years before. It is Rubinek's last appearance.
- Maurice Hines as Billie Bump (2 episodes). A Yale lawyer, Agency operative, and McCall's personal trainer introduced in the second season episode "Memories of Manon: Part 1" for an operation of "diversion and psychological warfare." His last appearance is in season three, "Shadow Play."
- Leonardo Cimino as Doctor Phil Molinari (2 episodes). A doctor in the Department of Health, Bureau of Contagious Diseases in season four, who helps the Medical Examiner and Dr. Lauren Demeter (Jenny Agutter) contain an outbreak in "The Visitation" and last seen in "17 Zebra." Cimino had previously appeared as mobster Thomas Marley Sr., the incarcerated father of Vincent D'Onofrio's character, in season two before his new role.
- Jack Gilpin as Harvey (2 episodes). A talkative pharmacy delivery man that tries to sell useless items and information to McCall, in "Desperately" and "Tip on a Sure Thing."
- Lori Loughlin as Jenny Morrow (2 episodes). The daughter of American journalist Frank Morrow who was kidnapped in season two, "Prelude" and later appears in "First Light" where she and Scott McCall date.
- Cleavant Derricks as Sonny Raines (2 episodes). An Agency operative who works for Control, but is always in danger of losing his job because of his gambling addiction. McCall pays his debt to trade for a favor in "Joyride," and utilizes his expertise in "Tip on a Sure Thing."
- John Bedford Lloyd as D.A. Francis Scanlon (2 episodes). A New York District Attorney in season three that pays back a favor to McCall in "Video Games" and provides insight about a murderer in "Target of Choice."
- Roma Maffia as Sindee (2 episodes). Dana's hooker acquaintance who first appears in "Desperately" to give McCall information about a hit-man. She helps Dana with intelligence again in "Dead Drop."
- Fred Williamson as Lt. Mason Warren (2 episodes). An NYPD detective at the 75th precinct in the first season, who assists McCall. He appears in back-to-back episodes, "Reign of Terror" and "Back Home."
- Robert Blumenfeld as Wilhite (2 episodes). A U.S. Treasury Department bank examiner who helps McCall in financial inquiries with his talent; "a sixth sense of all the dirt people hide in their books. If I wasn't a Bank Examiner, I'd be a Detective." Introduced in season one in "Back Home," Wilhite investigates a bank owner who is also a landlord. In season two, Wilhite is kept busy by the IRS, and checks if a business owner has "cooked" his books in "A Community of Civilized Men."
- Wendell Pierce as Dr. Cameron Wolff (2 episodes). A man "with a social conscience" and McCall's friend, who runs a neighborhood free clinic with a specialty in psychology. He is introduced giving his professional opinion in the season four premier, "The Last Campaign" and appears again in "Starfire."
- Harsh Nayyar as a Medical Examiner (2 episodes). An NYC coroner in season four, who performs an autopsy in "Sea of Fire" to graphically teach gang members about death. His last appearance is in "The Visitation."

=== Notable guest stars ===
The show had quite a number of notable guest stars, including well-established veteran actors, relative new-comers, and those making their television or screen debuts. Some became major stars within a few years of their appearances.

==== Musicians ====
Stewart Copeland, who composed the show's theme song and much of its music, made a cameo as a pickpocket in "Re-Entry." In the same episode, David Johansen (AKA Buster Poindexter), the lead singer of the proto-punk band the New York Dolls, plays a thug named Garnet, who abducts John Goodman's character at gunpoint. Adam Ant played a vile villain in "The Lock Box." In "Bump and Run," Meat Loaf makes an appearance as Sugar Fly Simon, a dealer of illegal guns. Adam "Ad-Rock" Horovitz of the Beastie Boys made a rare acting appearance along with Alex Winter in "Mama's Boy." Singer Vitamin C, who is credited under her real name Colleen Ann Fitzpatrick, appears as a hostage in "Last Call" and as a singer in "Eighteen with a Bullet" who performs despite being manipulated by her dangerous manager, played by Bruce Payne. In "Nocturne", the rhythm and blues singing duo, Ashford & Simpson perform their 1986 #4 hit single "Count Your Blessings" from their Real Love album. Broadway baritone singer Bruce Hubbard plays a club Manager in "Solo," and Detective Warren in "Race Traitors" alongside singer/guitarist Michael Cerveris portraying Nick Kaminsky, who gets caught up with a group of skinheads and an Aryan Leader played by The Velvet Underground founder John Cale. Singer Karen Akers had a supporting role in "China Rain" as Cynthia, a nightclub "Head of Personal Relations." Jasmine Guy, in her first credited on-screen role, plays Gloria in "Out of the Past." In the episode "Inner View," singer Paul Hipp plays Jarret, the lead singer of Archon, baritone singer Terrence Mann is a villain called "Shadow Man", and multi-instrumentalist Tim Cappello appears as an Archon roadie. Cappello also plays an adult shopkeeper in "A Place to Stay."

==== News and media personalities ====
Notable news and talk show hosts, disc jockeys, comedians, and other personalities from the television and radio include:

- Sally Jesse Raphael and Bobby Rivers both interview a gun-control advocate, Sylvia Thorton, played by Barbara Williams in "Making of a Martyr."
- New York WNBC news anchor Roger Grimsby reports on the assault of a night watchman at the zoo, and an escaped timber wolf roaming Manhattan in "The Mystery of Manon" (Part 1)."
- Warner Wolf appears on McCall's TV set commenting on the current horse races in "Tip on a Sure Thing."
- New York media personality Donna Fiducia appears as newscaster Diane Waters in "The Cup."
- Sheila Stainback of INN / USA Tonight and of WPIX New York Tonight made cameos as an Anchorperson in "Blood & Wine," as herself in "Inner View," and as a Newscaster in "Race Traitors."
- Journalist Lycia Naff plays the concerned girlfriend of Danny Winters (Christopher Collet's character) in "The Child Broker."
- Ken Ober plays a DJ who takes fan calls live on WZAD with Beverly Heat (Vitamin C's character) in "Eighteen with a Bullet."
- Native New Yorker comedian Mickey Freeman made his last television appearance in "Counterfire," doing a lousy job in front of a tough crowd at a comedy club.
- NYC stand-up comedian Rick Aviles appeared as Scam in "A Place to Stay."

==== Stage performers ====
The series also made good use of its New York City filming location/setting by employing actors who were appearing on Broadway in the late 1980s as guest stars. These include Christine Baranski, Philip Bosco, Yvonne Bryceland, J. Smith-Cameron, Caitlin Clarke, Kevin Conway, Jim Dale, Dee Hoty, Bruce Hubbard, Terrence Mann, Frances Ruffelle, Josef Sommer, and Anne Twomey.

==== Woodward colleagues and family ====
Additionally, several former stage and screen co-stars of Edward Woodward appeared on the show. These included Brian Bedford, Tammy Grimes (real-life mother of Amanda Plummer), Gwen Verdon, Sandy Dennis, Jenny Agutter, Shirley Knight, and Sylvia Sidney.

Woodward's second wife, Michele Dotrice, appeared as the central character in "Heartstrings". Her father, Roy Dotrice, also guest-starred on the show in "Trial by Ordeal." Edward Woodward's son, actor Tim Woodward, appeared as McCall's father in a flashback scene in "Prisoners of Conscience."

==== Film and reboot guest stars ====
A few notable guest stars have gone on to appear in The Equalizer films and 2021 revival series.

- Neal Ben-Ari made his television debut on season one of The Equalizer as Male Suit in "No Conscience" (1986), and plays mobster Stanley in season three, "Something Green" (1988). In 2022, Benari played Arieh Bitton in the reboot episode, "What Dreams May Come."
- Dennis Boutsikaris played C.R. Heaton in season three, "In the Money" (1987) and played Judge Thomas Clemmens in the reboot episode, "D.W.B." (2022).
- Melissa Leo, who guest starred as Irina Dzershinsky in the third episode of season one, "The Defector," plays Susan Plummer in all three films.
- John Bedford Lloyd who played D.A. Francis Scanlon also played Howard in the reboot season two episode, "Vox Populi."
- Roma Maffia made her television debut in season one of The Equalizer as the recurring character Sindee, who is a call girl that Dana Caldrin relies on to glean intelligence from her clients. In the reboot, Maffia has another recurring role as therapist Dr. Willa Roszak, beginning with season 2 in "What Dreams May Come" and continuing in season 5 with "Just Fans."
- Valarie Pettiford's television debut role was investigative reporter Jackie Chenier in "No Place Like Home" (1988), and after a long successful career, she played a reoccurring role as Carol Dante, Marcus Dante's mother, in the reboot, beginning with the season two episode, "D.W.B." (2022).
- Laila Robins, who plays Cindy Claussen in the season four premiere, "The Last Campaign" goes on to play CIA Director Suri Nance in the reboot episode, "The Milk Run."
- Ching Valdes-Aran made her 1985 screen/television debut in the second episode of season one as McCall's contact from the Orient, Tommy Li, in "China Rain." Her second Equalizer role came in the season three episode, "Video Games" (1987). In 2025, Valdes-Aran played Lorna Bayani, Mel Bayani's mother, in season five of the reboot, in "Dirty Sexy Money."
- Frank Whaley played Press in season three, "The Child Broker" and played Martin Culvert in the season three reboot episode, "Paradise Lost"

== Music ==
The show's theme music was created by composer/performer Stewart Copeland. The track is called "Busy Equalizing". An extended version appears on his album The Equalizer and Other Cliff Hangers.

Six episodes in the 1988 season were scored by Joseph Conlan and the final season was scored by Cameron Allan. Other episodes were scored by John Cacavas.

== Episodes ==
Season	Episodes	Originally released	
Season	Episodes	First released	Last released
1	22	September 18, 1985	April 8, 1986
2	22	October 8, 1986	May 27, 1987
3	22	September 23, 1987	May 4, 1988
4	22	October 26, 1988	August 24, 1989

The show ran for four seasons of 22 episodes each. It was initially renewed for a fifth season (causing Keith Szarabajka to turn down a role on Midnight Caller). However, the show was later canceled due to a row between CBS and Universal Studios over the renewal of Murder, She Wrote.

In The Story of The Equalizer, created for the DVD box set, executive producer Coleman Luck also stated that Universal requested a script for a crossover episode with Magnum, P.I. despite the objections of the Equalizer crew as its dark tone was much different than Magnum's much lighter and sunnier style. Ultimately the episode was never filmed, but its script was adapted and changed, airing as the episode "Beyond Control".

== Reception ==
=== Television ratings ===
Nielsen ratings per season of The Equalizer
Season	Episodes	First aired		Last aired		TV season	Rank	Avg. HH rating
Season	Episodes	Date	HH rating	Date	HH rating	TV season	Rank	Avg. HH rating
1	22	September 18, 1985	18.3	April 8, 1986	10.8	1985–86	63	12.6
2	22	October 8, 1986	17.0	May 27, 1987	13.4	1986–87	36	15.4
3	22	September 23, 1987	14.4	May 4, 1988	11.9	1987–88	54	12.8
4	22	October 26, 1988	11.9	August 24, 1989	8.2	1988–89	66	11.0

=== Critical response ===
After the broadcast of the first episode in September 1985, the show received mixed reviews. Critic Tom Shales wrote in The Washington Post that "to judge from this very attractively atmospheric premiere, [the show] could become a welcome guest in many an American home". However, for People, Jeff Jarvis wrote, "The plot’s confusing and the show's as erratic as a pacemaker on low batteries".

=== Awards and nominations ===
The Equalizer cast and crew awards
Year	Award	Category	Nominee(s)	Result	Ref.
1986	38th Primetime Emmy	Outstanding Lead Actor in a Drama Series	Edward Woodward for playing Robert McCall	Nominated	
1986	2nd Artios Award	Best Casting for Dramatic Episodic Television	Lois Planco	Nominated	
1987	39th Primetime Emmy	Outstanding Lead Actor in a Drama Series	Edward Woodward for playing Robert McCall	Nominated	
1987	44th Golden Globe	Best Actor in a Television Series Drama	Edward Woodward	Won	
1987	Edgar Allan Poe Award	Best Episode in a TV Series	David Jackson (Teleplay) & Andrew Sipes (Story) for "The Cup"	Won	
1987	3rd Artios Award	Best Casting for Dramatic Episodic Television	Lois Planco	Nominated	
1988	40th Primetime Emmy	Outstanding Lead Actor in a Drama Series	Edward Woodward for playing Robert McCall	Nominated	
1988	45th Golden Globe	Best Actor in a Television Series Drama	Edward Woodward	Nominated	
1989	41st Primetime Emmy	Outstanding Guest Actor in a Drama Series	Michael Moriarty for playing Wayne "Seti" Virgil in "Starfire"	Nominated	
1989	41st Primetime Emmy	Outstanding Guest Actress in a Drama Series	Shirley Knight for playing Kay (Robert McCall's ex-wife) in "Time Present, Time Past"	Nominated	
1989	5th Artios Award	Best Casting for Dramatic Episodic Television	Lois Planco	Nominated	
1990	42nd Primetime Emmy	Outstanding Lead Actor in a Drama Series	Edward Woodward for playing Robert McCall	Nominated	

== Localizations ==
The series was translated into Afrikaans for broadcast through South Africa's SABC as Die laaste uitweg.

The series was broadcast throughout the Arab World with Arabic subtitles during the 1990s, like in Egypt through Channel 2 and Saudi Arabia through Saudi 2.

== Home media ==
On February 12, 2008, Universal Studios released Season 1 of The Equalizer on DVD in Region 1 (US only).

On May 15, 2013, it was announced that Visual Entertainment had acquired the rights to the series in Region 1. They subsequently released season 2 on DVD on August 26, 2014. Season 3 was released on October 25, 2014, followed by season 4 on November 24, 2014.

Visual Entertainment also released a limited edition complete series set on DVD on August 19, 2014. The Equalizer Complete Collection Limited Edition set contains all 88 episodes plus 12 hours of bonus content including CI5: The New Professionals; the last film ever done by Edward Woodward, A Congregation of Ghosts; and The Story of The Equalizer featuring interviews with cast and crew.

In Region 2, Universal Playback UK released season 1 on DVD on April 21, 2008. In late 2011, Fabulous Films announced that they had acquired the rights to the series. They have subsequently released seasons 2–4. On May 27, 2013, Fabulous Films released The Equalizer: The Complete Collection on DVD. This 24-disc box set contains all 88 episodes of the series as well as bonus content including an all-new documentary featuring interviews with cast and crew.

For the Region 1 DVD's many of the music apart from the theme and scoring by Stewart Copeland has been replaced by cover versions due to the costs for music licensing. In contrast, the Region 2 version contains all of the original music intact.

In Region 4, Umbrella Entertainment has released all four seasons on DVD in Australia.

DVD Name	Ep#	Release dates		
DVD Name	Ep#	Region 1	Region 2	Region 4
The First Season	22	February 12, 2008	April 21, 2008	March 9, 2011
The Second Season	22	August 26, 2014	March 26, 2012	April 4, 2012
The Third Season	22	October 25, 2014	October 1, 2012	August 1, 2012
The Fourth Season	22	November 24, 2014	October 29, 2012	November 7, 2012

== Adaptations ==
=== Film series ===
A film starring Denzel Washington in the title role, very loosely based upon the series, was released in September 2014. It was followed by a sequel, The Equalizer 2, which was released on July 20, 2018. A third film, titled The Equalizer 3, with Washington and director Antoine Fuqua returning was released on September 1, 2023.

=== 2021 television revival series ===
In November 2019, CBS announced that a reboot was in development with Queen Latifah in the lead role as Robyn McCall. Andrew Marlowe and Terri Miller were named as showrunners with Latifah herself as an executive producer. On January 27, 2020, CBS issued a pilot order for the new version.

The series was among the 14 pilots ordered by CBS in February 2020 and was fast tracked to series the following March, as they are unable to film their pilots where Universal Television was shut down because of the COVID-19 pandemic.

On May 8, 2020, CBS picked up the series and they added Chris Noth as William Bishop, a quirky ex-CIA director who is the opposite of Latifah. It premiered on February 7, 2021, after Super Bowl LV.

=== Literature ===
Michael Sloan wrote a series of novels about the character. The first is The Equalizer, published in 2014, followed by Killed in Action: An Equalizer Novel, released in 2018. The novels are a modern reimagining of the original series and focus on McCall leaving The Company and eventually becoming a private investigator in New York. They feature a number of original recurring characters from the television series such as Mickey Kostmayer, Control, and Scott McCall. A third novel, Equalizer: Requiem was released in 2020.

== See also ==
- Callan, a TV spy series in which Woodward played a character similar to that of The Equalizer's Robert McCall.
