= Michael Sloan (television writer) =

American television producer and writer (1946–2025)

- Born: Michael Fred Sloan; October 14, 1946; New York, U.S.
- Died: August 13, 2025 (aged 78)
- Occupations: Television producer; writer
- Spouse: Melissa Sue Anderson (m. 1990)

Michael Fred Sloan (October 14, 1946 – August 13, 2025) was an American television producer and writer. He was best known for co-creating the CBS action crime drama television series The Equalizer with Richard Lindheim.

In addition to co-creating The Equalizer, he produced and wrote for television programs including Columbo, Harry O, Battlestar Gallactica, B. J. and the Bear (and its spin-off The Misadventures of Sheriff Lobo), The Hardy Boys/Nancy Drew Mysteries and McCloud.

In 1978, he was nominated for a Primetime Emmy Award in the category Outstanding Drama Series for his work on the television program Quincy, M.E. His nomination was shared with Richard Irving, Jud Kinberg, Glen A. Larson, Edward Montagne, Chris Morgan, Robert F. O'Neill, B.W. Sandefur and Peter J. Thompson.

Sloan died on August 13, 2025, at the age of 78.
