= Central Intelligence =

2016 film by Rawson Marshall Thurber

- Theatrical release poster
- Directed by: Rawson Marshall Thurber
- Screenplay by: Ike Barinholtz; David Stassen; Rawson Marshall Thurber
- Story by: Ike Barinholtz; David Stassen
- Produced by: Scott Stuber; Peter Principato; Paul Young; Michael Fottrell
- Starring: Dwayne Johnson; Kevin Hart; Amy Ryan; Aaron Paul; Jason Bateman
- Cinematography: Barry Peterson
- Edited by: Mike Sale; Brian Olds
- Music by: Theodore Shapiro; Ludwig Göransson
- Production companies: New Line Cinema; RatPac Entertainment; Perfect World Pictures; Bluegrass Films; Principato-Young Entertainment
- Distributed by: Warner Bros. Pictures (United States and Canada); Universal Pictures (International, via United International Pictures)
- Release dates: June 10, 2016 (Regency Village Theater); June 17, 2016 (United States)
- Running time: 108 minutes
- Country: United States
- Language: English
- Budget: $50 million
- Box office: $217 million

Central Intelligence is a 2016 American buddy action comedy film directed by Rawson Marshall Thurber and written by Thurber, Ike Barinholtz and David Stassen. The film stars Dwayne Johnson and Kevin Hart as two old high school classmates who go on the run after one of them joins the CIA to save the world from a terrorist who intends to sell satellite codes.

The film premiered at the Regency Village Theater on June 10, 2016, and was theatrically released in the United States on June 17, 2016 by Warner Bros. Pictures and in international markets by Universal Pictures. Central Intelligence received mixed-to-positive reviews, which praised Johnson and Hart's performances but criticized the script, and was a commercial success, grossing over $217 million worldwide against its $50 million budget.

== Plot ==
In 1996 suburban Baltimore, star athlete Calvin "The Golden Jet" Joyner is being honored at his school, Central High. Halfway through his speech, a group of bullies led by Trevor Olson throws the obese nerd Robbie Weirdicht (who was taking a shower and dancing happily to "My Lovin' (You're Never Gonna Get It)" on a radio in the boys’ locker room) naked into the gymnasium in the middle of an assembly. Everyone starts laughing except for Joyner and his girlfriend, Maggie Johnson, who are the only ones sympathetic towards Weirdicht; Joyner even going as far as to quickly cover him with his varsity jacket in a moment of compassion. Weirdicht thanks Joyner and flees in humiliation and embarrassment.

Twenty years later, Joyner is married to Maggie and works as a forensic accountant, but is dissatisfied with his career. She suggests they see a therapist to salvage their deteriorating marriage. At work, Joyner receives a friend request on Facebook from "Bob Stone", who invites him to meet at a bar. Stone reveals himself to be Weirdicht, who has transformed into a muscular, fit, confident man with advanced hand-to-hand combat skills.

After a bar fight and tour of the school, Stone asks Joyner to review some online transactions, and he discovers a multimillion-dollar auction with bidders from radical countries, with the final bids set to conclude the following day. The next morning, a team of CIA agents led by Pamela Harris arrives at Joyner's in search of Stone, who shockingly vanished after sleeping on Joyner's couch. Harris tells Joyner that Stone is a dangerous rogue agent who murdered his former partner, Phil Stanton.

Harris tells Joyner that Stone intends to sell satellite codes to the highest bidder. Soon after Stone abducts him, explaining that he is trying to stop a mysterious criminal called the "Black Badger" from selling the codes but needs Joyner's skills to locate the meeting place. After an attack by a bounty hunter, Joyner flees and calls Maggie, telling her to meet him at the marriage counselor's office. Harris intercepts him, telling him that Stone is the Black Badger. She warns him to not tell Maggie and gives him a device to alert them to Stone's location.

Joyner meets Maggie for their marriage counseling session, where Stone is posing as the counselor. Stone convinces Joyner to help him, so he sets up a meeting with Olson, who can track the offshore account for the auction to get the deal's location. Olson feigns an apology for bullying Stone before once again antagonizing him. Harris calls Joyner and threatens to arrest Maggie if he fails to help them detain Stone. Joyner reluctantly betrays him, and the CIA arrests him.

As Harris tortures Stone to get his confession, Joyner helps him escape, and discovers the deal is happening in a Boston underground parking garage and helps Stone steal a plane. Stone enters alone, while Joyner watches Harris entering a short while later. Assuming that she is the Black Badger, he runs after her, only to find Stone meeting with the buyer and claiming to be the Black Badger. Stone shoots Joyner, grazing his neck, to keep him safe. Stanton arrives, having faked his death, and reveals himself to be the Black Badger, and that Stone was framed.

A fight breaks out, and Stanton reveals his plan to frame Stone for the crime. Stone kills him by ripping his throat out. Joyner and Stone make it to their 20th high school reunion. Upon arriving, Joyner reconciles with Maggie and promises to improve their marriage. The new prom king is announced to be Stone; Joyner reveals to Maggie that he hacked the school's voting system to make it happen. Olson shows up to bully Stone again, but he finally stands up for himself and punches him unconscious.

In Stone's acceptance speech, he reveals that he is Weirdicht, cites the importance of overcoming obstacles, and praises Joyner as his best friend. He then relives his most embarrassing incident on his terms by stripping. Stone then encounters his high school crush Darla McGuchian, whom he proceeds to share a kiss and dance with.

Sometime later, Maggie is now pregnant, and Joyner has joined Stone in the CIA. As a gift for his first day on the job, Stone returns Joyner's varsity jacket.

== Cast ==
- Kevin Hart as Calvin "Golden Jet" Joyner: A former popular star athlete who went to high school with Robbie, now working as an accountant.
- Dwayne Johnson as Bob Stone / Robbie Weirdicht: A former bullied, obese, friendless, socially awkward high school student turned big-bodied CIA agent and hand-to-hand combatant who is a movie fan obsessed with Sixteen Candles and Road House.
  - Sione Kelepi as Young Robbie Weirdicht
- Amy Ryan as Agent Pamela Harris: A CIA agent who suspects Bob is a rogue agent.
- Aaron Paul as Philip "Phil" Stanton: Bob's former partner, who is believed to be dead after apparently being killed in action.
- Jason Bateman as Trevor Olson: A former high school student who bullied Robbie in the past.
  - Dylan Boyack as Young Trevor
- Danielle Nicolet as Maggie Joyner (née Johnson): Calvin's high school sweetheart now turned wife.
- Tim Griffin as Agent Stan Mitchell
- Timothy John Smith as Agent Nicholas "Nick" Cooper.
- Megan Park as Lexi, the waitress in the bar.
- Thomas Kretschmann as the buyer: A man who wants to buy US satellite codes.
- Melissa McCarthy as Darla McGuchian (uncredited): Robbie's former high school crush.
- Kumail Nanjiani as Jared: the airport security guard.
- Ryan Hansen as Steve: a coworker of Calvin.
- Slaine as Thugged Out

== Production ==
=== Development ===
The script was greenlit by Universal Pictures in 2010, and Rawson Marshall Thurber was selected to direct and started to write the script together with Ike Barinholtz and David Stassen. Before production began, Thurber convinced New Line Cinema to buy the script and the studio became the film's domestic distributor through Warner Bros. Pictures. That year, Dwayne Johnson was cast alongside Kevin Hart.

=== Filming ===
Principal photography began on May 6, 2015, and took place in Atlanta, Georgia, and throughout various Massachusetts locations, including Boston, Burlington, Lynn, Middleton, Winchester, Somerville and Quincy. Principal photography ended in July 2015. To promote the film, Johnson and Hart had an Instagram war against each other on set.

== Release ==
=== Theatrical ===
The film premiered at the Regency Village Theater on June 10, 2016. Warner Bros. Pictures handled distribution in the United States, where the film opened on June 17, 2016, while Universal covered global distribution, as the film was released between June and July 2016.

=== Home media ===
Central Intelligence was released on Digital HD on September 13, 2016, before being released on DVD, Blu-ray and 4K Ultra HD on September 27, 2016.

== Reception ==
=== Box office ===
Central Intelligence grossed $127.4 million in North America and $89.5 million in other territories for a worldwide total of $216.9 million, against a budget of $50 million. Deadline Hollywood calculated the net profit of the film to be $52 million, when factoring together all expenses and revenues for the film.

Central Intelligence opened on June 17, 2016, alongside Finding Dory and was projected to gross around $30 million from 3,508 theaters in its opening weekend. The film grossed $1.8 million from its Thursday previews and $13 million on its first day. The film went on to gross $35.5 million, finishing second at the box office behind fellow newcomer Finding Dory ($135.1 million).

=== Critical response ===
On Rotten Tomatoes, Central Intelligence has an approval rating of 71% based on 184 reviews with an average rating of 5.76/10. The site's critical consensus reads, "Kevin Hart and Dwayne Johnson make for well-matched comic foils, helping Central Intelligence overcome a script that coasts on their considerable chemistry." On Metacritic, the film has a weighted average score of 52 out of 100 based on 35 critics, indicating "mixed or average" reviews. Audiences polled by CinemaScore gave the film an average grade of "A−" on an A+ to F scale, while PostTrak reported filmgoers gave it a 75% overall positive score and a 55% "definite recommend".

Peter Travers of Rolling Stone gave the film two out of four stars, writing, "If you're expecting the story threads to cohere, you're in the wrong multiplex. Central Intelligence always takes the lazy way out. You go along for the ride because Hart and Johnson promise something they can't deliver: a movie as funny as they are." Ignatiy Vishnevetsky of The A.V. Club criticized the film as a "shambolic high-concept farce that doubles as a cautionary tale of where studio comedies go wrong," writing, "In spots as indifferent and self-indulgent as any latter-day Adam Sandler production ... , [Intelligence] switches back and forth from snail-paced to incoherently over-stuffed on a moment's notice, with no in-between mode." Keith Phipps of Uproxx gave the film a positive review, saying, "It all adds up to the sort of breezy, undemanding comedy that fits nicely into the summer months, and plays beautifully in endless cable repeats."

=== Accolades ===
Award	Category	Recipient(s)	Result	Ref(s)
Critics' Choice Awards	Best Comedy	Central Intelligence	Nominated	
Critics' Choice Awards	Best Actor in a Comedy	Dwayne Johnson	Nominated	
Golden Trailer Awards	Best Comedy	"Trailer 1"	Nominated	
Golden Trailer Awards	Best Comedy Poster	"Big Johnson Teaser"	Nominated	
Nickelodeon Kids' Choice Awards	Favorite BFFs (Best Friends Forever)	Dwayne Johnson and Kevin Hart	Won	
People's Choice Awards	Favorite Comedic Movie	Central Intelligence	Nominated	
People's Choice Awards	Favorite Comedic Movie Actor	Kevin Hart	Won	
People's Choice Awards	Favorite Comedic Movie Actor	Dwayne Johnson	Nominated	
Teen Choice Awards	Choice Summer Movie	Central Intelligence	Nominated	
Teen Choice Awards	Choice Summer Movie Actor	Kevin Hart	Won	
Teen Choice Awards	Choice Summer Movie Actor	Dwayne Johnson	Nominated	

== Future ==
In November 2021, writer/director Rawson Marshall Thurber stated that a sequel had been in development, before being delayed in favor of the collaboration between Johnson and Hart in the Jumanji sequels.

== See also ==
- Jumpin' Jack Flash (film) – 1986 spy comedy film directed by Penny Marshall
