= Timothy Smith (psychologist) =

American psychologist

Timothy Smith is an American psychologist, currently Distinguished Professor at University of Utah.
