= Richard Lindheim =

American television producer and writer

- Born: May 15, 1939; New York, U.S.
- Died: January 18, 2021 (aged 81)
- Occupations: Television producer; writer

Richard Lindheim (May 15, 1939 – January 18, 2021) was an American television producer and writer. He was best known for co-creating the CBS action crime drama television series The Equalizer with Michael Sloan.

In addition to co-creating The Equalizer, he produced and wrote for the NBC action comedy television series B. J. and the Bear, and its spin-off The Misadventures of Sheriff Lobo.

Lindheim died on January 18, 2021, of heart failure, at the age of 81.
