= The Misadventures of Sheriff Lobo =

1979 American action/adventure situation comedy

- Also known as: Lobo
- Genre: Action comedy; Police procedural
- Created by: Glen A. Larson
- Directed by: Bruce Bilson; Nicholas Colasanto; Daniel Haller; Dick Harwood; Leslie H. Martinson; Christian I. Nyby II; Charles R. Rondeau; James Sheldon
- Starring: Claude Akins; Brian Kerwin; Mills Watson; Ben Cooper
- Composers: Jimmie Haskell; Stu Phillips; John Andrew Tartaglia
- Country of origin: United States
- Original language: English
- No. of seasons: 2
- No. of episodes: 38

Production
- Executive producer: Glen A. Larson
- Producers: Richard M. Bluel; Joe Boston; Bill Dial; Frank Lupo; Richard Lindheim; Robert F. O'Neill
- Running time: 45–48 minutes
- Production companies: Glen A. Larson Productions; Universal Television

Original release
- Network: NBC
- Release: September 18, 1979 – May 5, 1981

Related
- B. J. and the Bear

The Misadventures of Sheriff Lobo is an American action comedy television series that ran on NBC from September 18, 1979, to May 5, 1981. For its second season the show was renamed Lobo. The program aired Tuesday nights, at 8:00 p.m. Eastern time. The lead character, Sheriff Elroy P. Lobo, played by Claude Akins, was a spin-off character from B. J. and the Bear, which also aired on NBC from 1979–1981.

== Synopsis ==
In fictitious Orly County, Georgia, Sheriff Lobo is the lead enforcer of the law—as well as one of its leading offenders. The pilot of The Misadventures of Sheriff Lobo aired as an episode of BJ and the Bear titled "Lobo", which set the premise for the show and introduced the main cast of characters that would be involved in the show.

The corrupt (but now somewhat reformed) sheriff is assisted in his schemes by Deputy Perkins (Mills Watson), whose buffoonery often upsets and exacerbates the situation. An honest but naive new deputy, Birdwell "Birdie" Hawkins (Brian Kerwin), who is unaware of Lobo's schemes, has joined the force and has become one of Lobo's deputies.

Birdie often refers to Lobo as his "Hero" and compares him to Wyatt Earp—"a little rough around the edges, but a good lawman." At first this baffles Lobo—to think that someone actually thinks highly of him in any way—but it begins to make Lobo feel proud and boosts his self-esteem. This always annoys and infuriates Deputy Perkins, who usually sneers at Birdie and mutters, "I'm gonna have to get that boy!"

Other characters in the show are Perkins' wife (and Lobo's sister) Rose Lobo Perkins (Cydney Crampton); waitress Margaret Ellen (Janet Lynn Curtis); resort owner Sarah Cumberland (Leann Hunley); bank president and Lobo's former "partner in crime" Harry Cunningham (Dennis Burkley); and district attorney Alexander Waverly (Ben Cooper).

The series premise was overhauled completely as Season 2 began in 1980. The governor of Georgia—impressed by Orly County's low crime rate (because Lobo forgot to send the crime data to the state capitol)—reassigns Lobo and Deputies Perkins and Birdie to his crime-fighting task force, the Governor's Taskforce in Atlanta. Lobo now reports to Chief J.C. Carson (Nicolas Coster). Lobo is forced to contend with his new co-workers, Detectives Peaches (Amy Botwinick) and Brandy (Tara Buckman). The new format also included Nell Carter (billed as Nell Ruth Carter) as Sgt. Hildy Jones.

In a July 1980 interview with The New York Times, NBC president Fred Silverman said research showed the show performing well in rural areas but not as well in urban areas. Silverman had a history of preference for urban viewers over rural ones that dated back to 1970. (See the rural purge for an example.) For that reason, it had been decided to move the show from rural Orly County to urban Atlanta. But the series was less successful with the new format, and it was cancelled after the end of its second season.

The theme song for the show's first season was sung by Frankie Laine and was written in a western ballad style that depicted Lobo as more of a hero than an offender. During the second season, the theme song was a version of "Georgia on My Mind".

== Cast ==
- Claude Akins as Sheriff Elroy P. Lobo
- Mills Watson as Deputy Perkins
- Brian Kerwin as Deputy Birdwell "Birdie" Hawkins
- Cydney Crampton as Rose Lobo Perkins
- Janet Lynn Curtis as Margaret Ellen
- Leann Hunley as Sarah Cumberland
- Dennis Burkley as Harry Cunningham
- Nell Carter as Sergeant Hildy Jones
- Nicolas Coster as Chief J.C. Carson
- Amy Botwinick as Peaches
- Tara Buckman as Brandy

== Episodes ==
=== Season 1 (1979–80) ===
No. overall	No. in season	Title	Directed by	Written by	Original release date
1	1	"The Day That Shark Ate Lobo"	Dick Harwood	S : Chris Bunch, Allan Cole & Glen A. Larson; T : Glen A. Larson	September 18, 1979
2	2	"Dean Martin and the Moonshiners"	James Sheldon	S : Thomas E. Szollosi & Richard Christian; S/T : Glen A. Larson & Frank Lupo	September 25, 1979
3	3	"The Panhandle Pussycats Come to Orly" "The Big Game"	Charles R. Rondeau	Harvey Bullock	October 9, 1979
4	4	"Disco Fever Comes to Orly"	Daniel Haller	Richard H. Landau	October 16, 1979
5	5	"The Mob Comes to Orly"	Mel Ferber	S : Chris Lucky; T : Glen A. Larson & Michael Sloan	October 23, 1979
6	6	"Run for the Money: Part 2"	Bruce Bilson	S : Glen A. Larson & John Peyser; T : Michael Sloan; S/T : Sidney Ellis, Frank Lupo & Robert L. McCullough	November 6, 1979
Crossover story with B. J. and the Bear.
7	7	"Run for the Money: Part 3"	Bruce Bilson	S : Glen A. Larson & John Peyser; T : Michael Sloan; S/T : Sidney Ellis, Frank Lupo & Robert L. McCullough	November 13, 1979
Crossover story with B. J. and the Bear.
8	8	"Buttercup, Birdie and Buried Bucks"	Daniel Haller	Robert K. Baublitz	November 27, 1979
9	9	"The Senator Votes Absentee"	William P. D'Angelo	Robert Wolterstorff & Paul M. Belous	December 4, 1979
10	10	"The Boom Boom Lady"	Daniel Haller	Stephen Miller	December 11, 1979
11	11	"First to Finish, Last to Show"	Leslie H. Martinson	Robert Wolterstorff & Paul M. Belous	January 8, 1980
12	12	"Hail! Hail! the Gang's All Here"	James Sheldon	Stephen Miller	January 15, 1980
13	13	"The Luck of the Irish"	Leslie H. Martinson	S : Thomas Joachim & Eugene Fournier; S/T : Richard Bluel & Pat Fielder	January 22, 1980
14	14	"Double Take, Double Take"	Daniel Haller	Paul M. Belous & Robert Wolterstorff	January 29, 1980
15	15	"Police Escort"	James Sheldon	S : Michael Russnow; S/T : Robert E. Feinberg & Howard Liebling	February 5, 1980
16	16	"Who's the Sexiest Girl in the World?"	Daniel Haller	Glen A. Larson	February 19, 1980
17	17	"The Martians Are Coming, the Martians Are Coming"	James Sheldon	S : Tom Chehak; S/T : Stephen Miller	February 26, 1980
18	18	"The Treasure of Nature Beach"	Daniel Haller	Mark Jones	March 5, 1980
19	19	"Birdie's Hot Wheels"	James Sheldon	Mark Fink	March 11, 1980
20	20	"The Haunting of Orly Manor"	Daniel Haller	S : G.J. Young; T : Mark Jones, Robert E. Feinberg & Howard Liebling	March 18, 1980
21	21	"Mystery on the Orly Express"	Christian I. Nyby II	Lloyd Turner	March 25, 1980
22	22	"Orly's Hot Skates"	Jack Arnold	S : Richard Lindheim; T : Robert E. Feinberg & Howard Liebling	May 6, 1980
23	23	"Perkins Bombs Out"	Jack Arnold	S : David Chase, Bruce Shelly & David Ketchum; T : Mark Fink & Stephen Miller	May 13, 1980

=== Season 2 (1980–81) ===
No. overall	No. in season	Title	Directed by	Written by	Original release date
24	1	"The Dirtiest Girls in Town"	Corey Allen	Glen A. Larson	December 30, 1980
25	2	"The Girls with the Stolen Bodies"	Dick Harwood	S : Frank Lupo & Mark Jones; T : Mark Jones	January 6, 1981
26	3	"Macho Man"	Gene Levitt	Mark Jones & Glen A. Larson	January 27, 1981
27	4	"Airsick: 1981"	Bruce Kessler	Frank Lupo	February 3, 1981
28	5	"Coeds with Sticky Fingers"	Dick Harwood	Jeff Wilhelm	February 10, 1981
29	6	"Sex and the Single Cop"	Sidney Hayers	Mark Jones	February 17, 1981
30	7	"Another Day, Another Bomb"	Dick Harwood	Story by : Mark Jones & Glen A. Larson; Teleplay by : Mark Jones	February 24, 1981
31	8	"The French Follies Caper"	Nicholas Colasanto	Story by : Glen A. Larson & Lou Shaw; Teleplay by : Bill Dial	March 3, 1981
32	9	"The Fastest Women Around"	Nicholas Colasanto	S : Sy Salkowitz; T : Bill Dial	March 10, 1981 (Note: This episode was originally scheduled to air on January 20, 1981, but was preempted due to news coverage of the return of former American hostages in Iran.)
33	10	"Bang, Bang... You're Dead!"	Sidney Hayers	Jeffrey Scott	March 24, 1981
34	11	"The Cowboy Connection"	Harvey S. Laidman	Cliff Ruby & Elana Lesser	March 31, 1981
35	12	"What're Girls Like You Doing in a Bank Like This?"	Dick Harwood	Story by : Chris Bunch, Alan Cole & Mark Jones; Teleplay by : Mark Jones	April 7, 1981
36	13	"Lobo and the Pirates"	Christian I. Nyby II	Lou Shaw	April 21, 1981
37	14	"The Roller Disco Karate Kaper"	Sidney Hayers	Frank Lupo & Mark Jones	April 28, 1981
38	15	"Keep on Buckin'"	Daniel Haller	S : Warren Douglas, David Harmon, Frank Lupo, Lou Shaw & Mark Jones; T : Jeffrey Scott, Frank Lupo, Lou Shaw & Mark Jones	May 5, 1981

== Syndication ==
The series was syndicated in the early 1980s, as "The B.J./Lobo Show". For syndication, Universal offered the show in two versions, one was the original 60 minute format and the other had episodes cut to fit a half-hour time slot from their original hour versions. What differentiated the half hour episodes from the hour long ones was the inclusion of a laugh track.
