= Brian Kerwin =

American actor (born 1949)

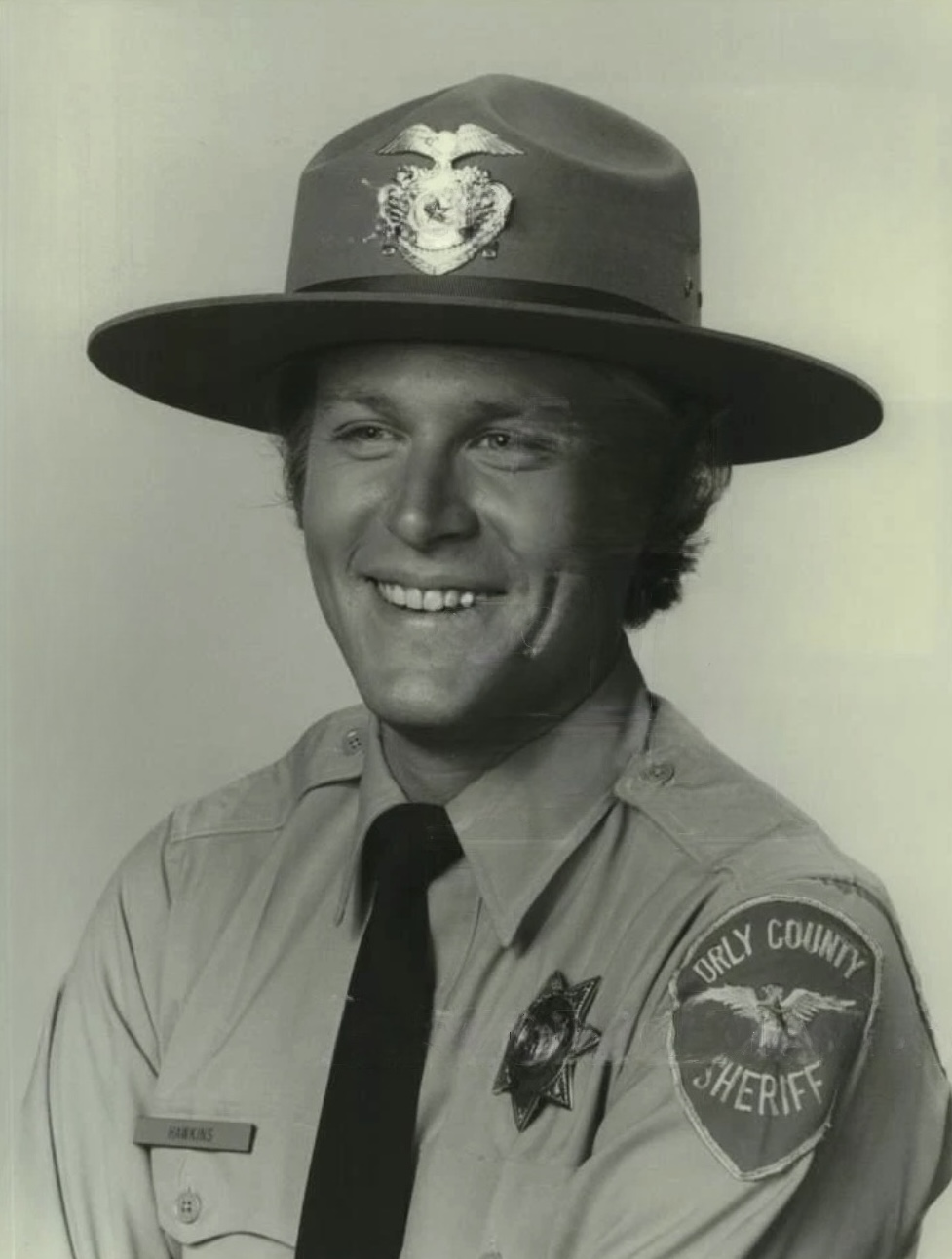
- Kerwin in The Misadventures of Sheriff Lobo, 1981
- Born: October 25, 1949 (age 77); Chicago, Illinois, U.S.
- Occupation: Actor
- Years active: 1976–present
- Spouse: Jeanne Troy (m. 1990; died 2016)
- Children: 3

Brian Kerwin (born October 25, 1949) is an American actor who has starred in feature films, Broadway shows, and television series and movies.

== Life ==
Kerwin was born in Chicago and raised in Flossmoor, Illinois. He has three siblings, Anne, Dennis, and Terrence.

Kerwin married Jeanne Marie Troy on September 2, 1990, and they had three children, Finn, Matilda, and Brennan. She died at the family home in Venice, California, on February 11, 2016, at age 55 after a three-year battle with brain cancer.

== Career ==
After graduating from USC Film School in 1972, Kerwin moved to New York to work in theater. won the Theatre World Award in 1988 for the off-Broadway play Emily. His Broadway credits include the 1997 revival of The Little Foxes and the Elaine May comedy After the Night and the Music in 2005. The same year, he starred in Edward Albee's The Goat or Who Is Sylvia? at the Mark Taper Forum.

In 1989, he played Nick in a revival of Albee's Who's Afraid of Virginia Woolf? at the Doolittle Theatre (now the Ricardo Montalbán Theatre) in Los Angeles. The production, directed by the playwright, starred Glenda Jackson and John Lithgow, with Cynthia Nixon as Kerwin's character's wife, Honey. The production was not well received. He played opposite Kathy Baker in the South Coast Repertory production of The Man from Nebraska in 2006. His most recent stage appearance was in the original Broadway production of August: Osage County in 2007.

Kerwin's feature films include Murphy's Romance, Hard Promises, 27 Dresses (as Katherine Heigl's character's father), Torch Song Trilogy, Love Field, Gold Diggers: The Secret of Bear Mountain, Jack, King Kong Lives, The Myth of Fingerprints, and Debating Robert Lee. Kerwin has enjoyed an extensive career in television, beginning with the daytime serial The Young and the Restless in 1976.

His credits on TV include a regular role on the Showtime series Beggars and Choosers, recurring roles on B.J. and the Bear and The Misadventures of Sheriff Lobo, The Chisholms (four episodes), Roseanne (as Gary Hall), The West Wing, Nip/Tuck and Big Love and guest appearances in The Love Boat, Simon & Simon, Highway to Heaven, Murder, She Wrote, St. Elsewhere, Frasier, Law & Order, Law & Order: Special Victims Unit, Blue Bloods, Boston Legal, Medium, Without a Trace, and Desperate Housewives. From 2007 to 2012, he appeared on the soap opera One Life to Live.

== Filmography ==
=== Film ===
Year	Title	Role	Notes
1979	Hometown U.S.A.	T. J. Swackhammer	
1980	Getting Wasted	Brad Carson	
1982	The Tragedy of King Lear	King of France	
1984	Nickel Mountain	George	
1985	Murphy's Romance	Bobby Jack Moriarity	
1986	King Kong Lives	Hank Mitchell	
1988	Torch Song Trilogy	Ed Reese	
1991	Hard Promises	Walt	
1992	Love Field	Ray Hallett	
1992	Spies Inc.	Jim	
1995	Gold Diggers: The Secret of Bear Mountain	Matt Hollinger	
1996	Getting Away with Murder	Marty Lambert	
1996	Jack	Brian Powell	
1997	The Myth of Fingerprints	Elliot	
1997	Mr. Jealousy	Stephen	
2004	Debating Robert Lee	Gary Mann	
2008	27 Dresses	Hal	
2011	The Help	Robert Phelan	
2014	Are You Joking?	Sandy	
2015	Addiction: A 60's Love Story	Irv Bornstein	

=== Television ===
Year	Title	Role	Notes
1977	Logan's Run	Patrick	Episode: "The Innocent"
1978	The Busters	Albie McRae	Television film
1978	David Cassidy: Man Undercover	Ernie	Episode: "Running the Hill"
1978	A Real American Hero	Til Johnson	Television film
1979	The Chisholms	Gideon Chisholm	4 episodes
1979	The Paradise Connection	Bruce Douglas	Television film
1979	B. J. and the Bear	Deputy Birdie Hawkins	3 episodes
1979–1981	The Misadventures of Sheriff Lobo	Deputy Birdie Hawkins	38 episodes
1980	Power	Jack Vanda	Television film
1980	CHiPs	Brian Kerwin	Episode: "The Great 5K Star Race and Boulder Wrap Party"
1980–1981	The Love Boat	Ted Lawrence / Hank Austin	3 episodes
1982	The Blue and the Gray	Malachy Hale	3 episodes
1982	Miss All-American Beauty	Michael Carrington	Television film
1983	Seven Brides for Seven Brothers	Mike	Episode: "Winner"
1983	Intimate Agony	Nick Todd	Television film
1984	Antony and Cleopatra	Eros	Television film
1984	Simon & Simon	Taylor Martin / Slack Reynolds	Episode: "The Dark Side of the Street"
1984	Wet Gold	Ben Keating, the Diver	Television film
1984	Highway to Heaven	Barry Rudd	Episode: "Hotel of Dreams"
1984	Murder, She Wrote	Andy Townsend	Episode: "Death Casts a Spell"
1986	St. Elsewhere	Terence O'Casey	2 episodes
1987	Great Performances	Hal Graham	Episode: "Tales from the Hollywood Hills: Natica Jackson"
1988	Bluegrass	Dancy Cutler	Television film
1989	The Hitchhiker	Doctor Winters	Episode: "Shadow Puppets"
1990	Challenger	Michael J. Smith	Television film
1990	Tales from the Crypt	Donald	Episode: "Judy, You're Not Yourself Today"
1990	Roseanne	Gary Hall	4 episodes
1991	Switched at Birth	Robert Mays	Miniseries
1992	Against Her Will: An Incident in Baltimore	Jack Adkins	Television film
1993	Angel Falls	Eli Harrison	5 episode
1995	Abandoned and Deceived	Doug	Television film
1996	It Came from Outer Space II	Jack Putnam	Television film
1996	Sins of Silence	Joey Finn	Television film
1996	Critical Choices	Flood	Television film
1996	Unlikely Angel	Ben Bartilson	Television film
1997	Volcano: Fire on the Mountain	Buck Adams	Television film
1997	The Wonderful World of Disney	David Strong	Episode: "Flash"
1998	Dead Man's Gun	Teddy Boyd / Joe Wheeler	Episode: "The Resurrection of Joe Wheeler"
1998	Giving Up the Ghost	Kevin	Television film
1998	Killer App	Larry Dawkens	Television film
1999	The Hunt for the Unicorn Killer	Saul Lapidus	Television film
1999–2001	Beggars and Choosers	Rob Malone	42 episodes
2000	Common Ground	Chuck Dawson	Television film
2001	A Girl Thing	Gary Tucker	Television film
2001	Frasier	Rob	2 episodes
2001–2021	Law & Order: Special Victims Unit	Various roles	3 episodes
2002	Law & Order	Ted Weldon	Episode: "Missing"
2002–2003	Strong Medicine	Les Campbell / Leslie Campbell	2 episodes
2004	The West Wing	Ben Dryer	3 episodes
2004	Revenge of the Middle-Aged Woman	Nathan Lloyd	Television film
2004	Boston Legal	Jack Fleming	Episode: "Truth Be Told"
2005	The Exonerated	Cop #2	Television film
2005	Medium	Nathan Bradley	Episode: "Too Close to Call"
2005	Grey's Anatomy	Holden McKee	Episode: "Thanks for the Memories"
2005	Nip/Tuck	Eugene Alderman	4 episodes
2006	Close to Home	Lee Towers	Episode: "The Good Doctor"
2006	Without a Trace	Randall Parker	Episode: "Stolen"
2006	Desperate Housewives	Harvey Bigsby	2 episodes
2006	Monk	Ben Glazer	Episode: "Mr. Monk Meets His Dad"
2007	Big Love	Eddie	4 episodes
2007–2011	One Life to Live	Charlie Banks	308 episodes
2011	A Gifted Man	Jim Marks	Episode: "In Case of All Hell Breaking Loose"
2012	The Client List	Garrett Landry	3 episodes
2012	Elementary	Charles Cooper	Episode: "Flight Risk"
2013	Blue Bloods	Pete Seabrook	Episode: "No Regrets"
2014	Dangerous Liaisons	Senator Fontaine	Television film
2014–2015	The Knick	Corky Vanderbilt	4 episodes
2015	Hindsight	Lincoln	5 episodes
2019	Madam Secretary	Deputy Secretary Steven Bailey	Episode: "The Great Experiment"
