= Timothy John Smith (actor) =

American actor

Timothy John Smith is a stage and screen actor. He has appeared in the films Central Intelligence, The Equalizer and The Judge. He has done extensive stage work in Boston and New York. In 2014, The New York Times praised him for his "intelligent, sensitive performance" in the off-broadway play On a Stool at the End of the Bar. In 2022, he toured the United States playing Cal and understudying Joe in the national tour of the stage musical Waitress.

A 2001 graduate of the Trinity Rep Conservatory, Smith has appeared in dozens of regional productions in New England and across the country. His turn as Bill Sikes in Trinity Rep's 2014 production of Oliver! drew rave reviews. He has played major roles in numerous other regional theater musicals including Annie (Daddy Warbucks), Les Misérables (Jean Valjean), Guys and Dolls (Sky Masterson), Man of La Mancha (Don Quixote) and Jerry Springer: The Opera (Satan).

As of 2016, he resides in New Jersey.

== Filmography ==
Year	Title	Role	Notes
2018	Castle Rock	Deputy Norris Ridgewick	TV series, episode #102, "Habeas Corpus"
2016	Central Intelligence	Agent Nick Cooper	Film
2014	The Equalizer	Detective Gilly	Film
2014	The Judge	"Both Ways" Bobby	Film
2013	Regret	Igor	Short film
2016	The Blacklist	Gabriel Stockwell	TV series, episode #103, "Alistair Pitt"
2016	The Mysteries of Laura	Richie Enzio	TV series, season 2, episode 16
2007	Revolution in Boston	James Otis	History Channel Documentary
2006	Greatest Stories Never Told	Host (20 episodes)	History Channel Web Shorts
