= Knight Rider (disambiguation) =

Knight Rider is an American entertainment franchise.

Knight Rider or Knight Riders may also refer to:

== Entertainment ==
- Knight Rider (1982 TV series), the original 1980s television series
- Knight Rider 2000, a 1991 sequel movie to the 1980s television series
- Knight Rider 2010, a 1994 made-for-television movie loosely based on the 1980s series
- Team Knight Rider, a 1997 spin-off television series based on the 1980s series
- Knight Rider (2008 film), a made-for-television film pilot to the 2008 television series
- Knight Rider (2008 TV series), a series following both the 2008 film and the 1980s TV series
- Knight Rider (1986 video game), a computer video game
- Knight Rider (1988 video game), a Nintendo Entertainment System video game
- Knight Rider Special, a 1989 PC Engine video game released in Japan
- Knight Rider: The Game, a 2002 PC and PlayStation 2 video game by Davilex Games

== Military ==
- HMMT-164, a US Marine Corps CH-46E Helicopter Training Squadron

== Sport ==
- A group of cricket teams owned by the Indian sports company Knight Riders Group:
  - Kolkata Knight Riders, in the Indian Premier League
  - Abu Dhabi Knight Riders, in International League T20
  - Los Angeles Knight Riders, in Major League Cricket
  - Trinbago Knight Riders, in the Caribbean Premier League
  - Trinbago Knight Riders (WCPL), in the Women's Caribbean Premier League
- Knight Riders (Super Fours), a women's cricket team that competed in the Super Fours
- A common nickname for British motorcycle enduro world champion David Knight

== See also ==
- Kamen Rider Knight, a character from Kamen Rider Ryuki
- Knight Ridder, a former media company in the United States
- Knightriders, a 1981 American drama film
- Night Rider (disambiguation)
