= Knight Rider 2008 =

Knight Rider 2008 may refer to:

- Knight Rider (2008 film), a 2008 American made-for-television action film
- Knight Rider (2008 TV series), an American action television series that follows the 1982 television series of the same title
