= Knight Rider (1986 video game) =

1986 video game released in Europe for Amstrad CPC, Commodore 64, and ZX Spectrum

- Developer: Ocean Software
- Publisher: Ocean Software
- Platforms: Amstrad CPC; Commodore 64; ZX Spectrum
- Release: EU: 1986
- Mode: Single-player

Knight Rider is a 1986 video game based on the series of the same name. It was developed and published by Ocean Software, and was released in Europe for Amstrad CPC, Commodore 64, and ZX Spectrum.

By April 1985, Ocean Software was planning to create a game based on the television series, with a release scheduled for later in the year. The game was delayed several times and was advertised for more than a year before its eventual release in 1986. Knight Rider was considered a disappointment, and was criticized for its graphics and gameplay.

== Gameplay ==
Knight Rider is based on the series of the same name. Michael Knight and KITT learn about a terrorist plot intended to trigger World War III. The player is given a map of the United States and must choose one of several cities. Most of the game consists of driving levels in which the player travels to the selected city while avoiding enemy fire from oncoming helicopters. During a driving level, the player is given a first-person view in the driver's seat. The player can choose to play as either Knight or KITT. As Knight, the player must fire back at the helicopters, while KITT drives and avoids the enemy fire. Playing as KITT, the player can reach up to 240 miles per hour, which is faster than if KITT drives himself.

After each driving level, the player enters an operations building with a floorplan that is viewed from an overhead perspective. Playing as Knight, the player must navigate the building while avoiding guards who patrol certain areas. At the end of each level, the player finds a clue relating to the terrorist plot. The player then selects another city and repeats the process.

== Reception ==
Reception

Review scores
Publication	Score
Crash	39% (ZX Spectrum)
Sinclair User	4/5 (ZX Spectrum)
Your Sinclair	4/10 (ZX Spectrum)
Zzap!64	16% (C64)
Happy Computer	18/100 (C64)

Critics considered Knight Rider to be a disappointment that was not worth the wait. Reviewers for Zzap!64 concluded, "Surely after sixteen months Ocean could have come up with something better than this." Tim Metcalfe of Computer and Video Games considered Knight Rider to be "awful", stating that it had no redeeming features. Jim Douglas of Sinclair User stated that the game lacked inspiration, and wrote that it was as "mediocre as the TV series from which it's taken but it doesn't qualify for so-bad-it's-good."

Computer Trade Weekly stated that the game should be avoided, calling it "an absolute waste of time." Phil South of Your Sinclair stated that Knight Rider "would have been a fair effort for a budget game, but for a full price, licensed game from a major software house, it hasn't got a hope!" Metcalfe stated that the game would be criticized even as a budget release.

The gameplay was variously criticized as being tedious, boring, and too easy. South wrote that KITT "is virtually impervious" to damage and thus "you can quite happily play the game (letting KITT drive you to the next location) and do something else. I am 'playing' the game now as I'm writing this, which I guess is a sure enough sign of how involved the gameplay is." The graphics were criticized, especially the driving levels. South stated that the helicopters resembled giant locusts. Metcalfe opined that the graphics had the outdated appearance of an old ZX81 driving game, while writing that the graphics "are extremely basic and uninteresting–as is the game itself."

== See also ==
- Knight Rider franchise
