= Justin Bruening =

American actor and former fashion model

- Born: September 24, 1979 (age 47); St. Helena, Nebraska, U.S.
- Occupations: Actor, model
- Years active: 2003–present
- Spouse: Alexa Havins (m. 2005)
- Children: 4

Justin Bruening (born September 24, 1979) is an American actor and former fashion model. He was discovered at a McDonald's in Escondido, California, and within a week, he was shooting photos with Bruce Weber. In 2003, his acting career began when he was cast in the role of Jamie Martin on the daytime drama All My Children, earning him a Soap Opera Digest Award in 2005 for the portrayal. In 2007, Bruening was cast as Mike Traceur, the son of character Michael Knight, a new take on the original Knight Rider series. In 2011, he was cast as Tyler Berrett, a recurring role on the series Ringer starring Sarah Michelle Gellar and in 2013, he joined Ravenswood. He also played paramedic Matthew Taylor on the medical drama Grey's Anatomy in 2013 and 2018. Between 2020 and 2026, he was a part of the main cast of the series Sweet Magnolias.

== Early life ==
Bruening was born on September 24, 1979, in St. Helena, Nebraska. Raised in the small town (a then-population of 85), he graduated from high school with only nine classmates.

== Career ==
Following graduation, Bruening moved to San Diego, California. It was there that he was discovered by Sue Nessel, a talent scout for Scott Copeland International, at McDonald's in Escondido just north of San Diego. Soon afterwards, Copeland got him his first modeling job for Abercrombie & Fitch.

Following his first commercial job, Bruening was encouraged to study acting by Copeland and was noticed by All My Children casting director Judy Wilson. Bruening originally auditioned for the role of JR Chandler on All My Children, but was eventually cast in the role of James "Jamie" Martin in July 2003. For a brief time, in 2004 and 2005, Bruening also portrayed Jamie Martin on One Life to Live during a crossover storyline. During his role of Jamie, Bruening was featured as Daytime's Hottest Star in Teen People, Us Weekly, Star and J-14 magazines.

In addition to his work on soap operas, he has had a guest appearance on Hope & Faith and a small part in the film Fat Girls. He was up for the role of Superman in Superman Returns, but the part was won by Brandon Routh instead. He also appeared in the Britney Spears music video "Boys". On October 21, 2007, he appeared on CBS's Cold Case, in the episode "Thick As Thieves".

In February 2008, Bruening starred in a new rendition of the original Knight Rider series, portraying the original Knight Rider's son, Mike Traceur, for a two-hour film on NBC. David Hasselhoff had a guest role, reprising his role as Michael Knight. The film and subsequent TV series also featured KITT (Knight Industries Three Thousand), a 2008 Ford Shelby GT500KR, with Val Kilmer as the voice of the highly advanced robotic automobile. NBC decided after successful ratings for the film to continue the story as a series, and commissioned an official series for its debut for the 2008–2009 television season.

In 2011, Bruening began a recurring role on the CW mystery series, Ringer. In 2012, he began a recurring role on the ABC Family drama, Switched at Birth. In 2013, he had a recurring role on the ABC drama, Grey's Anatomy as Paramedic Matt. He then featured in the limited season run of the Pretty Little Liars' spin-off Ravenswood in 2013. In 2018, he was cast as 'Nash' the co-star of the Hallmark Channel film Last Vermont Christmas. In 2020, he was cast as a series regular in the Netflix show Sweet Magnolias.

== Personal life ==
Bruening proposed to former All My Children co-star Alexa Havins on the set of the soap opera. They were married on June 5, 2005. The two were friends first before becoming romantically involved. After Bruening left All My Children, Havins exited shortly after and the couple moved to Los Angeles. They have four children: Lexington Grace, born in 2010, Zane in 2013, and Zoe in December 2015.

== Filmography ==
=== Film ===
Year	Title	Role	Notes
2006	Fat Girls	Bobby	Debut film
2008	Knight Rider	Mike Traceur	Television film
2010	Class	Whitt Sheffield	Television film
2012	Blue Eyed Butcher	Jeff Wright	Television film
2013	The Thanksgiving House	Everett Mather	Television film
2017	The Monster Project	Devon	Film
2018	He's Out There	Shawn	Film
2018	Indivisible	Darren Turner	Based on a true story
2018	Last Vermont Christmas	Nash	Television film (Hallmark)
2020	Swept Up By Christmas	Reed	Television film (Hallmark)
2022	Reindeer Games Homecoming	Chase Weston	Television film (Lifetime)
2022	Vanished: Searching for My Sister	Warren	Television film (Lifetime)

=== Television ===
Year	Title	Role	Notes
2003–2007, 2011	All My Children	James Edward "Jamie" Martin	Series regular (September 8, 2003–August 22, 2007), guest star (September 21–23, 2011); 163 episodes
2004–2005	One Life to Live	Jamie Martin	Recurring role (October 20, 2004–February 21, 2005); 8 episodes
2004	Hope & Faith	Jake	Episodes: "Hold the Phone" & "Do I Look Frat In This?"
2006	3 lbs	Personal trainer	Episode: "The Cutting Edge"
2007	Cold Case	Spencer Mason	Episode: "Thick as Thieves"
2007	CSI: Miami	Craig Abbott	Episode: "My Nanny"
2008–2009	Knight Rider	Mike Traceur (first episode); Michael "Mike" Knight II	Lead role
2011	Wonder Woman	Steve Trevor	"Pilot" (Never aired)
2011	Castle	Rod Tredwyck	Episode: "The Dead Pool"
2011	State of Georgia	Brad	Episode: "Flavor of the Week"
2011	CSI: NY	Hank Frazier	Episode: "Air Apparent"
2011–2012	Ringer	Tyler Barrett	9 episodes
2012–2013	Switched at Birth	Chef Jeff Reycraft	9 episodes
2013, 2018	Grey's Anatomy	Paramedic Matthew Taylor	16 episodes
2013	Hawaii Five-0	Lt. Commander William "Billy" Harrington	5 episodes
2013–2014	Ravenswood	Benjamin Price	4 episodes
2014	Royal Pains	Chase	Episode: "A Bigger Boat"
2015	CSI: Cyber	Evan Wescott	Episode: "The Evil Twin"
2015	The Messengers	Leo Travers	3 episodes
2015	Blood & Oil	Richard Ford	Episode: "Pilot"
2016–2017	Good Behavior	Kyle Dash	5 episodes
2020–2026	Sweet Magnolias	Cal Maddox	Main role
2020	Lucifer	DJ Karnal (Jed)	Episode: "BlueBallz"
2024	NCIS (TV series)	Lieutenant Bryce Prescott	Episode: "The Trouble with Hal"

== Awards and nominations ==
Year	Award	Category	Nominated work	Result	Ref.
2005	Soap Opera Digest Award	Outstanding Male Newcomer	All My Children	Won	
