= Knight Foundation (disambiguation) =

Knight Foundation refers to the John S. and James L. Knight Foundation, formerly the Charles L. Knight Memorial Education Fund.

Knight Foundation may also refer to:

- The Philip H. Knight Foundation, established by Phil Knight, Nike, Inc. co-founder, and his wife, Penny Knight
- The Wilton Knight Memorial Foundation for Law and Government, a fictional entity from the Knight Rider entertainment franchise
