= Knight Rider =

American entertainment franchise

- Franchise logo
- Created by: Glen A. Larson
- Original work: Original series (1982–1986)
- Owner: Universal Studios

Films and television
- Films: Knight Rider 2000 (1991); Knight Rider 2010 (1994); Knight Rider (2008)
- Television series: Knight Rider (1982–1986); Team Knight Rider (1997–1998); Knight Rider (2008–2009)

Games
- Video game(s): Knight Rider (1986); Knight Rider (1988); Knight Rider Special (1989); Knight Rider: The Game (2002); Knight Rider: The Game 2 (2004)

Knight Rider is an American entertainment franchise created by Glen A. Larson. The core of Knight Rider is its three-television series: the original Knight Rider (1982–1986) and sequel series Team Knight Rider (1997–1998) and Knight Rider (2008–2009). The franchise also includes three television films, a short-lived spin-off series, computer and video games, and novels, as well as KnightCon, a Knight Rider convention. Beginning with the original television series and continuing with the subsequent films and series, the franchise has developed a cult following and spawned many pop culture references.

The original Knight Rider series followed the adventures of Michael Knight, a sleek modern-day crime fighter who uses a technologically advanced, artificially intelligent automobile. This car, named KITT, is virtually indestructible, due to a high-tech coating applied to it called a "molecular bonded shell". Knight Rider stories usually depict either average citizens, or ethical heads of corporations, being bullied into subservience to an overbearing or ruthless criminal organization. The protagonists of each particular series are instructed by the Foundation for Law and Government (FLAG) to assist in some manner. The protagonists have the assistance of a high-tech, self-aware, and nearly indestructible vehicle.

== Overview ==
The series debuted in 1982 and ran for four seasons on NBC. These adventures were continued with the television films Knight Rider 2000 and Knight Rider 2010 and the short-lived Team Knight Rider. One other television movie, Knight Rider, served as a pilot for the 2008 television series Knight Rider. In 1985, a spin-off series, Code of Vengeance, also premiered.

Characters	Television series			Television films		
Characters	Knight Rider	Team Knight Rider	Knight Rider	Knight Rider 2000	Knight Rider 2010	Knight Rider
Year of Release	1982–1986	1997–1998	2008–2009	1991	1994	2008
Michael Knight (Michael Arthur Long)	David Hasselhoff	Body Double, Impersonator		David Hasselhoff		David Hasselhoff
KITT	William Daniels		Val Kilmer	William Daniels		Val Kilmer
KARR	Peter Cullen; Paul Frees		Peter Cullen			
Devon Miles	Edward Mulhare			Edward Mulhare		
Dr. Bonnie Barstow	Patricia McPherson					
April Curtis	Rebecca Holden					
Reginald Cornelius III ("RC3")	Peter Parros					
Russell Maddock				Carmen Argenziano		
Shawn McCormick				Susan Norman		
Knight Industries Four Thousand				Carmen Argenziano		
Thomas J. Watts				Mitch Pileggi		
Kyle Stewart		Brixton Karnes				
Jenny Andrews		Christine Steel				
Duke DePalma		Duane Davis				
Erica West		Kathy Trageser				
Kevin Sanders		Nick Wechsler				
Mike Traceur (Michael Knight, Jr.)			Justin Bruening			Justin Bruening
Dr. Sarah Graiman			Deanna Russo			Deanna Russo
Dr. Charles Graiman			Bruce Davison			Bruce Davison
Billy Morgan			Paul Campbell			Paul Campbell
Jake McQueen					Richard Joseph Paul	
Hannah Tyrie					Heidi Hudson Leick	
Will McQueen					Michael Beach	
K.D.					Heidi Hudson Leick	

=== Knight family tree ===
Elizabeth (Bishop) Knight (Barbara Rush)
Jennifer Traceur (Susan Gibney)	Michael Knight (David Hasselhoff)	Garthe Knight (David Hasselhoff)	Jennifer Knight (Mary Kate McGeehan)
Mike Traceur (Justin Bruening)	Jenny Andrews (Christine Steel)

== Television ==
Three television series make up the bulk of the Knight Rider mythos: Knight Rider (1982–1986), Team Knight Rider (1997–1998), and Knight Rider (2008–2009). There also was a spin-off series, Code of Vengeance, that ran for one season (1985–1986). In total, 133 Knight Rider episodes have been produced across the seven seasons of the four various TV series.

=== Knight Rider (1982–1986) ===
The original Knight Rider series saw Michael Knight (David Hasselhoff), a crime fighter who uses a high tech, artificially intelligent automobile, the Knight Industries Two Thousand (KITT). This car is a virtually indestructible weapon that fights for justice, and is voiced by William Daniels. The show was created and produced by Glen A. Larson, and was originally broadcast on NBC from 1982 to 1986. The show has 90 episodes over four seasons.

==== Spin-off: Code of Vengeance (1985–1986) ====
The two-part episode Knight Rider episode "Mouth of the Snake", was a backdoor pilot for a 1984 series to be called All That Glitters. Rejected by NBC, the lead character and actor were recycled for a 1985–1986 series titled Code of Vengeance, in it, David Dalton (Charles Taylor), a Vietnam veteran-turned-drifter, travels across the United States in a camper van, with only his dog for company. Dalton involves himself in the personal lives of people he meets. In a similar fashion to Knight Rider, he uses his fighting skills to help them gain justice over their enemies. The Dalton character was retooled for the planned spin-off series, whose pilot, Code of Vengeance, was a surprise ratings success in June 1985. A subsequent series, to be called Dalton, was ordered by NBC for midseason, then production was cancelled after just four episodes were completed. These aired in the summer of 1986 as a television movie titled Dalton: Code of Vengeance II and as a part of a fill-in series called Dalton's Code of Vengeance.

=== Team Knight Rider (1997–1998) ===
Team Knight Rider is set ten years after the original series, with the Foundation for Law and Government (FLAG) using a team of five "highly skilled operatives" to do the job that Michael Knight used to do. They are Kyle Stewart (Brixton Karnes), Jenny Andrews (Christine Steel), Duke DePalma (Duane Davis), Erica West (Kathy Trageser), and Kevin "Trek" Sanders, (Nick Wechsler). In one of the episodes it is implied that Jenny Andrews is the daughter of Michael Knight. However, it is never confirmed. The series was created by writer/producers Rick Copp and David A. Goodman, and was distributed by Universal Domestic Television. It ran for a single season of 22 one-hour episodes before it was canceled due to poor ratings.

=== Knight Rider (2008–2009) ===
The new Knight Rider series followed Michael "Mike" Traceur, the estranged son of Michael Knight, as he takes up the mantle of the FLAG driver. This time, he is driving the Knight Industries Three Thousand, also known as "KITT". The series stars Justin Bruening as Mike Traceur/Knight, and Deanna Russo as Sarah Graiman, Traceur's former girlfriend and love interest. Sarah is the daughter of Charles Graiman, played by Bruce Davison, the creator of a new generation of KITT, which is voiced by Val Kilmer. On May 19, 2009, NBC announced that Knight Rider was canceled after one season because of poor ratings.

=== Future ===
In 2016, it was announced that Machinima, YOMYOMF and NBCUniversal Brand Development are developing a Knight Rider reboot with Justin Lin producing and directing the series.

== Television films ==
=== Knight Rider 2000 (1991) ===
Knight Rider 2000 is a television sequel movie to the original Knight Rider series. It aired on May 19, 1991. It was directed by Alan J. Levi and written by Rob Hedden and Glen A. Larson. The movie sees Michael Knight (David Hasselhoff) teaming up once again with Devon Miles (Edward Mulhare) in a near future science fiction setting. He is also paired up with a new supercar, the "Knight 4000" to combat Thomas J. Watts (Mitch Pileggi), a former police officer turned psychotic killer. The movie also starred Susan Norman as Officer Shawn McCormick, and Carmen Argenziano as Russell Maddock (and the voice of the Knight 4000). The movie was developed as a pilot for a proposed new series, but despite high ratings, the plan was abandoned.

=== Knight Rider 2010 (1994) ===
Knight Rider 2010 is a television movie loosely based on the original Knight Rider series. It aired on February 13, 1994. It was directed by Sam Pillsbury and written by John Leekley. The movie is set in a Mad Max-style future where Jake McQueen (Richard Joseph Paul) is a smuggler who is contacted by Hannah Tyree (Hudson Leick), an employee of the Chrysalis Corporation, who want him to work for them as part of their video games division. Jake fights the evil Jared (Brion James). Hannah's consciousness is uploaded into a computer that Jake then installs in his Mustang. The movie was broadcast as part of Universal Television's Action Pack.

=== Knight Rider (2008) ===
Knight Rider is a 2008 television film which was created to serve as a backdoor pilot for the new Knight Rider television series, and aired on February 17, 2008. The serves as a direct sequel to the original series and ignores the Knight Rider 2000 film and the Team Knight Rider television series. It was directed by Steve Shill and written by David Andron and Glen A. Larson. The movie sees Mike Traceur (Justin Bruening) teaming up his childhood friend, Sarah Graiman (Deanna Russo), her father Charles Graiman (Bruce Davison), and Special Agent Carrie Rivai (Sydney Tamiia Poitier) to fight evil, he is paired up with a new KITT, the Knight Industries Three Thousand. The movie was a success and resulted in a new series.

== Video games ==
=== Knight Rider (1986) ===
Knight Rider is a 1986 video game by Ocean Software that was released in Europe for several computer platforms.

=== Knight Rider (1988) ===
Knight Rider is a racing video game for the Nintendo Entertainment System that is very loosely based on the television show of the same name. It was developed by Pack-In-Video and published by Acclaim Entertainment. The game sees KITT having to travel between fifteen cities that are featured, starting with San Francisco and ending in Los Angeles.

=== Knight Rider Special (1989) ===
Knight Rider Special (ナイトライダースペシャル, Naito Raidā Supesharu) is a video game for the PC-Engine based on the 1980s television series Knight Rider. It was developed and published by Pack-In-Video on December 22, 1989 in Japan only. The game has a series of levels and each one requires that KITT be navigated through and around various cars, big rig trucks, and other obstacles in order to reach their destination on each level.

=== Knight Rider: The Game (2002) ===
Knight Rider: The Game is a video game based on the original television series of the same name. It was developed by Davilex Games and distributed by Tri Synergy, and was released on November 22, 2002. The game allows the player to take control of KITT – the Knight Industries Two Thousand, in a range of missions including, racing, exploring, chasing and others. The player also meets famous villains from the original series, including KARR and Garthe Knight.

=== Knight Rider: The Game 2 (2004) ===
Knight Rider: The Game 2 is a video game sequel to Knight Rider: The Game, which was again developed by Davilex Games and was published by Koch Media on November 5, 2004, for PC and PlayStation 2.

=== Knight Rider Pinball (2024) ===
Zen Studios released a Knight Rider table for Pinball FX on May 16, 2024 as part of the Universal Pinball: TV Classics pack. Includes modes taken from episodes "Goliath" (season 2), "Trust Doesn't Rust" (season 1), "Goliath Returns" (season 2), and "K.I.T.T. vs. K.A.R.R." (season 3).

== Merchandise ==
The Knight Rider franchise has a number of novels, video games, and other materials that cover many aspects of the various series and films.

Various toy versions of KITT were released and produced solid profits. The more notable of the Knight Rider memorabilia includes the remote controlled KITT, the Knight Rider lunch box, and the deluxe version of KITT. This final model, sold by Kenner Toys and dubbed the "Knight Rider Voice Car", spoke electronically, using a recording of the voice of William Daniels, featured a detailed interior and a Michael Knight action figure as well.

In the 1980s there was a Knight Rider toy vehicle for Germany's Darda system.

Also in the 1980s a Key Car of KITT was released. But it had no scanner and the windows were black with "Knight 2000" written in red letter on the doors. It included a key which was pushed into a hole below KITTs spoiler compressing a spring; then snaps into place. Squeezing the key releases it and the spring shoots the car forward.

As with many popular series of the era (including The Dukes of Hazzard, The A-Team etc.), ERTL released die-cast toys of KITT in three different sizes – the common miniature model, a "medium" model, and a large model. These toys featured red reflective holograms on the nose to represent the scanner (however, they were located on the point of the nose, rather like the early mock-up of KITT seen in the pilot episode) as opposed to altering the basic model design to incorporate the scanner as commonly seen in the series. The toys also included round steering wheels as opposed to KITT's steering yoke.

Also in late 2004, 1/18 scale die-cast models of KITT and KARR were produced from ERTL, complete with detailed interior and illuminated moving scanner, just like in the series.

In September 2006, Hitari, a UK-based company that produces remote control toy cars, released the Knight Rider KITT remote control car in 1/15 scale, complete with the working red scanner lights, KITT's voice from the television show and the car's turbine engine sound with the "whoosh whoosh" scanner sound effect.

In December 2012, Diamond Select Toys released a talking electronic 1/15 scale KITT that features an illuminated dashboard, scanner, fog lights and tail lights, along with the original voice of KITT, William Daniels, all at a push of a button. An Entertainment Earth exclusive version of that Diamond Select Toys 1/15 KITT, exclusive, as it will include an in scale figure of Michael Knight to go with the car, was released in February 2013 and was available exclusively at Entertainment Earth's Web site. Diamond Select Toys will also was to be releasing an 8-inch figure of Michael Knight with the likeness of David Hasselhoff, which was to be released in March 2013.

In February 2013, Hot Wheels released a 1/18 die-cast of KITT as part of their die-cast Elite series of vehicles under their Cult Classics Collection. This one from Hot Wheels was an improvement over the one ERTL released back in 2004. With sharper attention to details on the dashboard, the model features an improved light up red scanner, opening doors and rear hatch, as well as an engine hood which opens up to reveal a detailed Knight 2000 turbine engine which is exclusive to the model and was never shown in the TV series. Additional features include pop up headlights, revolving license plates, ejector seats, removable t-tops and a foldable rear seat.

A "Fun Pack" based on Knight Rider for the toys-to-life video game Lego Dimensions was released in February 2017. The pack includes a Michael Knight minifigure and constructible KITT, and unlocks additional Knight Rider-themed content in the game.

In 2016, Call of Duty: Infinite Warfare's "Zombies" mode features David Hasselhoff reprising his role as Michael Knight, appearing as the games map "Zombies in Spaceland"'s DJ. The Knight Rider theme plays in game and many references to the series and KITT are made.

In 2024, Hasbro would release a new Knight Rider-themed toy in their Transformers Collaborative range. Officially licensed by General Motors, the toy includes an electronic soundbox and a series of LEDs representing K.I.T.T.'s strobe lights. The robot mode stands at 6 inches in height at is molded to feature specific details of David Hasselhoff's on-screen costume for Michael Knight.

== Film adaptation ==
In March 2002, Revolution Studios announced a partnership with Mayhem Pictures to create a film adaptation of the television series. The film would be re-designed to be similar to Revolution's previous project, XXX. Series creator Glen A. Larson was hired to write the first script draft, with the series' lead actor David Hasselhoff attached as an advisor and also have an onscreen role. In April 2003, Revolution Studios hired screenwriters David Elliott and Paul Lovett to pen the film's script. In April 2004, the premise of the film was described as having Hasselhoff reprise his role as Michael Knight, now the mentor to the protagonist as Devon Miles mentored Knight in the television series. The protagonist would be Knight's son, inheriting his father's role and driving the vehicle KITT. The producers' choice for the role was Ben Affleck.

In May 2006, The Weinstein Company acquired film rights to adapt Knight Rider from series creator Larson. He expressed his interest in the film adaptation as a potential franchise property. The following September, Hasselhoff invited Orlando Bloom to portray Knight's son in the film adaptation, but Bloom turned down the offer. In April 2007, Hasselhoff said, that the film was in development at Miramax, and that he would at least have a cameo in the film.

On June 26, 2013, Brad Copeland was writing a script for a Knight Rider film after beating out Travis Beacham, Alex Kurtzman and Roberto Orci.

On February 13, 2014, Schmoes Know reported that Chris Pratt and Danny McBride were in talks for roles and may use a sort of action-comedy hybrid in the same vein as 21 Jump Street.

In December 2015, a media report indicated that a new web series named Knight Rider Heroes was in the works and would include David Hasselhoff. This concept was never completed or released. The project is believed to be abandoned.

In August 2020, Deadline reported that Spyglass Media Group has teamed with Atomic Monster’s James Wan and Michael Clear to develop the film with Judson Scott serving as executive producer and TJ Fixman adapting the screenplay.

In August 2025, The Hollywood Reporter reported that Cobra Kai creators Jon Hurwitz, Hayden Schlossberg, and Josh Heald are in talks to write and produce a feature film at Universal Pictures, the former two aiming to direct. The film is additionally produced by 87North Productions and Spyglass Media Group and continues off a previous script penned by Kevin Burrows and Matt Mider.
