= Knight Rider (1988 video game) =

1988 video game for the NES

- North American cover art
- Developer: Pack-In-Video
- Publishers: JP: Pack-In-Video; NA/EU: Acclaim Entertainment
- Platform: Nintendo Entertainment System
- Release: JP: September 30, 1988; NA: December 1989; EU: July 27, 1990
- Genre: Racing
- Mode: Single-player

Reception

Review score
Publication	Score
AllGame	3/5

Knight Rider (ナイトライダー Naito Raidā) is a 1988 racing video game for the Nintendo Entertainment System that is very loosely based on the television show of the same name.

== Gameplay ==
The gameplay is simple: There are fifteen cities that are featured, starting with a drive from Los Angeles to San Francisco and ending back in Los Angeles. KITT can be upgraded with more fuel and shield capacities. It can also have its top speed upgraded, and how many lasers/missiles it starts with. In the first six missions, there are allies, represented by Knight trucks who will give a powerup to the player.

=== Mission mode ===
Terrorists have raided a U.S. military site; only a man and his robotic car can chase them across the United States to stop their evil plan. A time limit helps put pressure on the player as he attempts to defeat the terrorist forces. There are three types of vehicles in this mode: Red (enemies), blue (civilians) and yellow (enemies who carry powerups). KITT has structural shielding; however the vehicle is considered destroyed if it repeatedly crashes or enemy gunfire depletes the shielding. Despite the non-violent premise of the television show, "Mission Mode" makes use of firearms as way to enhance play, similar to RoadBlasters. Shooting non-combatant (blue) vehicles deducts from the timer, making the completion of a level more difficult. After every third level, Devon will offer the player a password that can be used to resume the journey from that point.

=== Drive mode ===
There is also a drive mode that allows players to go on a simple drive through the game's stages without weapons or enemy fire.

== Music ==
The game pointedly does not include the iconic theme from the Knight Rider television show.

== See also ==
- Knight Rider franchise
