= Knight Rider (2008 film) =

2008 television film directed by Steve Shill

- Title card
- Based on: Characters by Glen A. Larson
- Written by: David Andron
- Directed by: Steve Shill
- Starring: Justin Bruening; Deanna Russo; Bruce Davison; Sydney Tamiia Poitier; Val Kilmer (Voice); David Hasselhoff; Greg Ellis
- Music by: Christopher Tyng
- Country of origin: United States
- Original language: English

Production
- Producer: Sean Ryerson
- Cinematography: Jamie Barber; Kris Krosskove
- Editors: Stewart Schill; William B. Stich
- Running time: 80 minutes
- Production companies: Cullen Bros. Productions; Dutch Oven; Universal Media Studios

Original release
- Network: NBC
- Release: February 17, 2008

Knight Rider is a 2008 American made-for-television action film, which was created to serve as a backdoor pilot for the new Knight Rider television series, a sequel to the 1982–1986 series of the same name. This film makes no references to either the Knight Rider 2000 film or the Team Knight Rider television series, instead as a reboot.

== Plot ==
At night, several power company technicians answer a call at Charles Graiman's home. He is suspicious, as he did not expect them until the next morning. They threaten his daughter if he does not co-operate and Graiman suffers a fatal heart attack. Searching his home for hard drives containing the information they are after (for a defense project named Prometheus), they stumble across a parked Ford Mustang Shelby GT500KR in the garage that they unsuccessfully try to stop.

Mike Traceur, a 25-year-old ex-Army Ranger, is awakened by his friend Dylan Fass to deal with "Mike's investors" who are attempting to collect a $90,000 gambling debt. Traceur's Shelby Cobra breaks down when he attempts to flee, and the men threaten Fass's life if Traceur does not pay the debt.

After an early morning surf, FBI special agent Carrie Rivai receives a call that Graiman, her longtime friend, is dead and leaves her date, a woman she met the night before, to investigate.

Sarah Graiman, a 24-year-old Ph.D. candidate at Stanford University, lectures a class on nanotechnology. After the lecture, she receives a phone call from KITT warning her about the men planning to abduct her. Sarah's pursuers catch her, but she is rescued by KITT. Sarah and KITT track down Traceur, who turns out to be her childhood friend, and whom she was involved with has not seen since he left home at 18. They find him at the Montecito Casino, playing poker to repay his debt. He is resistant when Sarah asks for help, but agrees when she offers to pay his debt. The two set out to find out what happened to Graiman and discover who is after them.

Rivai arrives at Graiman's home and is asked by the local corrupt sheriff to identify the body. She discovers it is not Charles Graiman; the real Graiman escaped through the woods and left a body double behind. Graiman makes his way to the home of Traceur's mother, Jennifer. The two leave for a local motel.

The men chasing them are mercenaries for Black River, a security contractor. They are after Prometheus, a system that controls the entire United States defense network. Information needed to control the system is contained on Graiman's hard drives in the mercenaries' possession, but is encrypted; only Graiman and Sarah know the encryption keys. KITT also possesses the data and can access the system.

Graiman contacts Sarah and asks her to meet him at the motel. He advises Sarah to contact Rivai for help. When she does so, Rivai puts her phone in speaker-mode so the sheriff can hear the location, unaware that the sheriff is working with the mercenaries.

KITT, Sarah, and Traceur find that the mercenaries have reached the motel, but have not found Graiman, as he checked into four different rooms. Using KITT's infrared sensors, Traceur finds Graiman with his mother and rescues them. Jennifer and Graiman reveal that Traceur's father was a man named Michael Knight and that he drove the first KITT, forcing him to stay away from his family. Traceur is absorbing this information when they reach KITT and find one of the mercenaries hacking into his system. Graiman asks KITT to shut down to prevent further infiltration and suggests Traceur drive the car manually.

As the group is leaving, the mercenaries find them. They shoot and kill Jennifer. Graiman is taken away and the other two are left to kill Traceur and Rivai as well as watch over Sarah and KITT. Just as they are about to be killed by the mercenaries, Traceur and Rivai overpower their capturers. Traceur and Sarah take KITT to chase after Graiman while Rivai stays with Jennifer's body.

Traceur and Sarah discover KITT's vulnerability to damage, due to the loss of his self-repair capabilities while his system is deactivated. After exchanging fire, Traceur reactivates KITT with just enough time to activate his armor without allowing the mercenaries to hack into him, and turns KITT directly into the mercenaries' path, causing a collision. KITT survives with no damage, while the mercenaries' SUV is heavily damaged. Graiman survives while his captors are mortally wounded or dead.

On the way to Jennifer's funeral, Graiman reveals that he's re-forming the Foundation for Law and Government (FLAG) and offers Traceur the chance to drive KITT. He refuses due to philosophical differences, saying "I just don't believe in the same things you do."

At the funeral, Traceur meets his father, Michael Knight, who tells him what Wilton Knight once told him on his death-bed — that one man can make a difference — and that he (Knight) was that man. They shake hands and as Knight prepares to leave, Traceur asks if they will ever meet again. Knight responds back to his son, "I hope so."

Traceur is behind KITT's wheel in an enclosed area. Rivai, Graiman, Sarah, and Fass bid him farewell and inform him of his mission. Sarah kisses him goodbye and a door opens behind him that shows a moving road. KITT and Mike drive out in reverse. The door is the cargo hatch of a C-130 Hercules cargo plane which then takes off. Mike switches to manual at KITT's indignation, turns KITT around, and drives away.

== Cast ==
- Justin Bruening as Michael "Mike" Traceur
- Deanna Russo as Sarah Graiman
- Bruce Davison as Charles Graiman
- Sydney Tamiia Poitier as FBI Special Agent Carrie Rivai
- Val Kilmer as the voice of KITT
- David Hasselhoff as Michael Knight
- Susan Gibney as Jennifer Traceur
- Wayne Kasserman as Dylan Fass
- Jack J. Yang as Cross
- Kevin Dunigan as Smokeee
- Greg Ellis as Welther

== Production ==
=== Development ===
On September 26, 2007, NBC announced that it would create a two-hour backdoor pilot to air during the 2007–2008 season. Justin Bruening stars as Mike Traceur, the estranged son of Michael Knight. Other actors who appeared in the movie include Deanna Russo as Traceur's former girlfriend and love interest, Sarah Graiman, Bruce Davison as Sarah's father, physicist Charles Graiman, and Wayne Kasserman as Dylan, Traceur's roommate and friend. David Hasselhoff returns as Michael Knight in a cameo. KITT is portrayed as a black 550 horsepower (410 kW) Ford Shelby GT500KR Mustang.

Supervising producer David Andron wrote the pilot script under executive producers Doug Liman and Dave Bartis. The success of the 2007 film Transformers inspired NBC Entertainment President Ben Silverman to revive Knight Rider.

NBC announced on December 13, 2007 that the new two hour pilot would air on February 17, 2008. Two new cast members were also announced; Will Arnett as the voice for the new KITT Mustang, and Sydney Tamiia Poitier as FBI agent Carrie Rivai. Less than two weeks before the television film aired, Arnett stepped down as the voice of KITT after General Motors informed him of a conflict of interest, since Arnett does voiceover work for GMC Trucks. As a result, Val Kilmer landed the role of voicing KITT.

Several scenes use the fictional Montecito Resort and Casino, from NBC's series Las Vegas.

=== Featured music ===
- This Name is Released Intro Sequence — Knight Rider (Original Theme Remix) Not Available On YouTube and Enerer Release 2013
- New Knight Rider Theme Song 2008 Out Now Time 2:10 On YouTube.
- Chase Scene – "The Rain" by The Bloody Hollies
- Grief Scene – "Happy" by The Wrens
- Searching for Mike Tracer – "Cat (On A Hot Tin Groove)" by The Morlocks
- Las Vegas Scene – "On The Run" by DeeKompressors & Classic
- Funeral Scene – "Right Here" by Natalie Walker
- TV Promotion – "Yeah Yeah" by Feeder

=== Vehicle ===
The Knight Industries Three Thousand (K.I.T.T.) superseded the Knight Industries Two Thousand (K.I.T.T.) . Voiced by Val Kilmer, KITT is a modified 2008 Ford Mustang Shelby GT500KR and has similar features to the original KITT. The new KITT boasts the following features among others:

KITT

- Laser
- Turbo Boost
- New attack mode
- Biomedical Scanner
- FBI database access
- High-speed Internet
- Voice-activated GPS
- Artificial Intelligence
- Military satellite access
- Sports-tuned suspension
- Self-regeneration and damage repair
- Xenon headlamps with infrared night-vision
- Biometric Interface to access security features
- 550 horsepower (410 kW) solar hybrid engine
- Electro magnetic pulse to knock out nearby electronic equipment
- Apple Wireless Keyboard in the glove box under an accessory drawer
- Wireless headset to communicate with passengers within a limited distance
- Metallic paint with nanotech enhanced camouflage that morphs the license plates and disguises the car as a normal Mustang in different colors

If KITT's Artificial Intelligence is offline, the self-regeneration mechanism is inactive, making it as vulnerable as an ordinary car. Part of the shutting down procedures of KITT's AI includes the release of the clutch pedal as well as a stick shift manual transmission Other details from the pilot film:

- Driving cross-country, KITT can average a speed of 191 mph (307 km/h) and travel 627 mi (1,009 km) in 3 h 17 min.
- Although largely solar powered, KITT does use gasoline; with 91% of the energy being recycled, it averages 167 mpg_{‑US} (1.4 L/100 km).

Instead of the famous communicator watch, KITT communicates with its operators via a Bluetooth-style wireless headset, and can access wireless phone networks. Since KITT can tie into numerous computer systems, it is able to emulate many of the functions of the watch, such as unlocking doors.

== Connections to original Knight Rider ==
Besides the remixed and original theme song and cameo by Michael Knight, the original KITT is shown (still in pieces) in the scene where the antagonists search the garage. The Trans-am body (sans-hood) is partially covered by a tarp, on which rest the rear spoiler. The famous KITT steering wheel (labeled "Knight Two Thousand") and "KNIGHT" license plate are also shown, along with numerous black car body parts. Also, when the camera shows a full scene of the garage, there are three cars in the garage: The 3000, The 2000 under the tarp and a 2000 without any of the parts missing.

The original series stated that the original KITT was designed by Wilton Knight. The 2008 film says that Graiman had a major hand in designing the car and the AI, and was subsequently relocated to protect him and his family.

== Reception ==
Although ratings for the movie were high, with Nielsen ratings reporting 10.0 million viewers watching NBC with 4.0/10 households tuning in, Knight Rider was generally received poorly by media outlets. IGN gave the movie a rating of 5 out of 10 saying, "No one expects Knight Rider to be particularly thought-provoking or deep, but something a bit more enjoyable would certainly be appreciated next time." Variety stated, "Unfortunately, even at 200 miles (320 km) an hour the times appear to have passed the concept by, and making "Knight Rider" road-worthy for further adventures will require more than just a tune-up." The Los Angeles Times stated, "The two-hour (!) movie/pilot/extended Ford commercial crept by Sunday night like a glacier with turbo-revving sound effects. (No advance screeners were available, never a good sign.)" Even with poor reviews, NBC captured first place within the 18–49 demographic. The movie averaged a viewership of 12.8 million viewers. The film was nominated for Outstanding Visual Effects in a Broadcast Miniseries, Movie or Special by the Visual Effects Society.

== Spin-off series ==
NBC commissioned a weekly series to debut during the 2008–2009 television season. Gary Scott Thompson was brought on to show-run and was committed to a two- year contract. Filming on the season began June 23, and the new series ran from September 24, 2008 to March 4, 2009 for just 17 episodes before being cancelled.

== Charity ==
Two of the Shelby Mustangs used to portray KITT in the film were auctioned off at the Barrett-Jackson Auction Company's Collector Car Event, held in Palm Springs, Florida. The cars sold as a pair for $300,000 to benefit Ford's "Salute to Education" scholarship program.

== See also ==
- Knight Rider franchise
