= Knight Rider Special =

1989 video game

- Developer: Pack-In-Video
- Publisher: Pack-In-Video
- Platform: PC Engine
- Release: December 22, 1989
- Genres: Racing, vehicular combat
- Mode: Single player

Knight Rider Special (ナイトライダースペシャル, Naito Raidā Supesharu) is a video game for the PC Engine based on the 1980s television series Knight Rider. It was developed and published by Pack-In-Video on December 22, 1989 in Japan only. The game features sound bites by KITT's voice actor, Akio Nojima, straight from the show's Japanese dub.

== Gameplay ==
Gameplay.

Unlike the NES version, Special's gameplay is featured in a third-person perspective akin to even the most basic driving games like Out Run and Rad Racer. The action is very similar to that of Chase H.Q. which also features a third-person driving perspective. Players have to navigate KITT through and around various cars, big rig trucks, and other obstacles in order to reach their destination and face each level's boss. However many of the cars on the open road are armed with rear guns and will try and fire at KITT. Jet fighters or propeller planes will also fly by and try to fire machine guns or drop missiles on KITT.

=== Areas / Checkpoints ===
Like many other driving games checkpoints or "areas" as they are called, are very important as one of the player's biggest enemies throughout the game is the clock. Players are given 60 seconds to get from area to area.

=== Weapons ===
KITT is only armed with a pair of machine guns and has a turbo boost function. Unlike the show and other Knight Rider games, turbo boosts can keep KITT airborne for long periods of time. Over the course of the game players can earn upgrades to strengthen KITT's abilities and defenses.

== Music ==
The game features the show's opening theme by composer Stu Phillips.

== Reception ==
Reception

Review score
Publication	Score
The Games Machine (UK)	69%

The game has been poorly reviewed, with the awkward controls being particularly criticized. To accelerate, the player must press up on the directional pad, making accelerating and turning at the same time difficult. Also, KITT cannot be steered while jumping, which makes jumping very likely to result in driving off the road.

== See also ==
- Knight Rider franchise
