= Team Knight Rider =

American television series

- The Team Knight Rider opening title sequence.
- Genre: Action; Science fiction Crime
- Created by: Rick Copp; David A. Goodman
- Based on: Knight Rider by Glen A. Larson
- Starring: Brixton Karnes; Christine Steel; Duane Davis; Kathy Trageser; Nick Wechsler
- Voices of: Tom Kane; Nia Vardalos; Kerrigan Mahan; Andrea Beutner; John Kassir
- Composer: Gary Stockdale
- Country of origin: United States
- Original language: English
- No. of seasons: 1
- No. of episodes: 22

Production
- Executive producers: Glen A. Larson; Rick Copp; David A. Goodman
- Producers: Scott McAboy; Gilbert A. Wadsworth III
- Running time: apx. 45 minutes
- Production companies: McAboy-Wadsworth Productions; Pacific Bay Entertainment; Copp & Goodman Television; Universal Television Enterprises

Original release
- Network: Syndication
- Release: October 4, 1997 – May 16, 1998

Related
- Knight Rider (1982)

Team Knight Rider (TKR) is an American action science fiction crime drama television series that was adapted from the Knight Rider franchise and ran in syndication between 1997 and 1998. TKR was created by writer/producers Rick Copp and David A. Goodman, based on the original series created by Glen A. Larson, who was an executive producer. TKR was produced by Gil Wadsworth and Scott McAboy and was distributed by Universal Domestic Television and ran a single season of 22 one-hour episodes. The original series had a strong fan base and was beloved by many viewers. Comparisons between the two shows may have worked against "Team Knight Rider," as it failed to capture the same magic and nostalgia as the original.

== Plot ==
The story is about a new team of high-tech crime fighters assembled by the Foundation for Law and Government (FLAG, formed by Wilton Knight) who follow in the tracks of the legendary Michael Knight and his supercar KITT. Instead of "one man making a difference", there are now five team members who each have a computerized talking vehicle counterpart. Like the original duo, TKR goes after notorious criminals who operate "above the law" – from spies and assassins to terrorists and drug dealers. The final episode of the season, and series, featured the reappearance of Michael Knight (seen only from behind and played by a body double) at the very end, serving as a cliffhanger to the season which was never resolved due to the series being cancelled.

== Cast ==
=== Team Knight Rider members ===
- Kyle Stewart, (played by Brixton Karnes), a former CIA agent and leader of TKR
- Jenny Andrews, (played by Christine Steel), a former Marine and Gulf War veteran. An episode of the series insinuates she may be the daughter of Michael Knight, however the question is never resolved.
- Duke DePalma, (played by Duane Davis), a former Chicago police officer and small-time boxer.
- Erica West, (played by Kathy Trageser), a former con artist and thief who was given a second chance to use her skills for law enforcement.
- Kevin "Trek" Sanders, (played by Nick Wechsler), a geeky yet handsome technical genius. His nickname was given to him by his parents, who are huge Star Trek fans.

=== Other FLAG members ===
- Gil, (played by Vince Waldron), one of the lead mechanics aboard Sky One.
- Clayton, (played by Rick Copp), the head chef aboard Sky One.
- Captain J.P. Wyatt, (played by Lowell Dean), the pilot of Sky One.
- Dr. Felson, (played by Steve Sheridan), the medical doctor aboard Sky One.
- Scott, (played by Michael Lexx), a mechanic aboard Sky One.
- Shadow, (played by Steve Forrest), a mysterious person who guides and feeds the team information throughout the season, eventually revealed to be a holographic projection controlled by K.I.T.T.

=== Other prominent characters ===
- Jim Marland is a character that replaced the original series' Devon Miles as leader of FLAG and was responsible for the design and construction of KRO (See other vehicles below). Later, Marland stepped down and Stewart was given both operational and field service control over TKR. His mindset since the KRO incident was "One man can be given too much power" and thus the 5 vehicles were created, each with their own weaknesses.
- Martin Jantzen, (played by Bill Bumiller), the criminally psychotic driver of K.R.O.
- Mobius, (voiced by David McCallum), the wheelchair and ventilator bound, criminal mastermind behind season 1's inter-episode subplot.
- Dennis, (played by Jim Fyfe), a mechanic aboard Sky One eventually revealed to be a mole paid off by Mobius to infect the cars with a computer virus.
- Liz "Starr" Starrowitz, (played by Rainer Grant ), a criminal who later reappears as the sidekick/lover of Mobius, and as a member of Mobius's "Legion of Doom".
- Max Amendes (listed as Max Amato in the credits of both episodes he appeared in and played by Jim Piddock), a criminal who later reappears as a member of Mobius's "Legion of Doom".
- Kayla Gordon, (played by Marta Martin), a criminal who later reappears as a member of Mobius's "Legion of Doom".
- Roland Laschewsky, (played by Roland Kickinger), Starr's bodyguard (and, therefore, Mobius' bodyguard as well).

== Production ==
=== Team vehicles ===
Team Knight Rider use five different vehicles for their missions, each with its own computer AI system similar to the original Knight Industries 2000 vehicle. Unlike KITT, these are specialized units with specific roles in the team. In addition, after the K.R.O. incident, Garland has had each vehicle installed with intentional weaknesses to act as a fail-safe in case any of them go rogue.

Although armored to protect their occupants, the vehicles do not share the original KITT's nearly indestructible "molecular bonded shell". Windows can be shattered by bullets or blown open with a small explosive, for example, while body panels can be damaged in collisions and roll-overs. The vehicles deploy their own self-repair system enabling the cars to fix their own minor damage – shattered windows and crushed body panels have been shown "fixed" soon after taking damage. More severe impacts however, require body shop maintenance to repair the vehicles.

- Danté (DNT-1), (voiced by Tom Kane), is a modified Ford Expedition sport utility vehicle driven by Kyle. The truck has enough room to transport the entire TKR team and functions like a mobile command center. Danté's AI expresses himself in a haughty British manner and has no misgivings about making his driver and passengers feel uncomfortable. He is the de facto leader of the vehicles (if they'd ever listen to him) and he usually speaks on their behalf.
- Domino (DMO-1), (voiced by Nia Vardalos), is a modified Ford Mustang convertible driven by Jenny. The AI's manner is sleek, sexy and flirtatious. She is also talkative and likes to gossip to the annoyance of the other TKR vehicles.
- Attack Beast (BST-1), (voiced by Kerrigan Mahan), is a modified Ford F-150 full-sized pickup truck with off-road capability, driven by Duke. Beast's AI has a stubborn and argumentative attitude that talks tough and is not afraid to stand up to a fight. Much to Duke's embarrassment, Beast also has a fondness for the music of Alanis Morissette. His favorite tactic is to crash through walls and surprise the enemy. Beast does not like to take orders from Duke or anyone else, but he is fiercely loyal and gets the job done. TKR member Jenny is the only one Beast will listen to, and his aggressive nature softens when she is around.
- Kat (KAT-1), (voiced by Andrea Beutner), is a high-tech motorcycle that merges with her twin, Plato, to form the advanced High Speed Pursuit Vehicle, capable of high speeds and incredible maneuverability. Kat is driven by Erica and her AI has a polar opposite personality to that of her driver. Kat is always concerned with rules and regulations and is in constant conflict with Erica's amoral traits. She acts more like Erica's mother than her partner, but she will do whatever is necessary to get Erica out of a jam.
- Plato (PLATO-1), (voiced by comedian John Kassir), is the other motorcycle that merges with his twin Kat to form the High Speed Pursuit Vehicle. Plato is driven by Trek and, like his operator, Plato is a nerdy brainiac completely consumed by facts, figures and data. Plato likes to quote television commercials and famous movie lines and talks in sort of a code that only Trek can understand. The two have developed a strange symbiotic relationship that the other TKR members can never figure out.

=== Other vehicles ===
- Sky One (SKY-1), (voiced by Linda M. McCollough), is a massive C5 military cargo airplane with special VTOL capability. Sky One acted as TKR's mobile base and vehicle transport, and carries a crew of 65, including the TKR field operatives, the flight crew, maintenance crew, mechanics, fire crew, kitchen staff, and medical staff.
- K.R.O., (pronounced Crow, an acronym for Knight Reformulation One) was supposed to have been the replacement for KITT. KRO is a modified black Ferrari F355 with a highly unstable AI similar to KARR. After events that led to his murdering of five people, KRO was deactivated. KRO's operator, Martin Jantzen, was equally unstable. KRO later escapes to kill his creator and FLAG is forced to destroy him. KRO was voiced by John B. Wells.
- K.A., short for Knight Alpha, a prototype vehicle introduced in "Legion of Doom" for a possible European Knight Rider team being prepared for delivery to Berlin. KA is a European-made Ford Ka compact hatchback. KA is capable of many languages, but refuses to speak English, preferring German.

== Episodes ==
No.	Title	Directed by	Written by	Original release date
1	"Fallen Nation"	Spiro Razatos	Rick Copp & David A. Goodman	October 4, 1997
The team rescues a supposed kidnapped general, only to uncover he is behind a plot to detonate a nuclear bomb over Washington D.C.
2	"The Magnificent T.K.R."	Gil Wadsworth	John Scheinfeld	October 11, 1997
The team goes after a foreign spy who has stolen a top-secret device and smuggled it to Mexico.
3	"The A-List"	William Warren	Rick Copp & David A. Goodman	October 20, 1997
The team infiltrates a mega-corporation believed to be responsible for the deaths of scientists developing competitive technologies.
4	"K.R.O."	Spiro Razatos	Steven Kriozere	October 27, 1997
The team goes after a crazed Ferrari super car called the "Knight Reformulation One" which escaped while being transported for reprogramming. Episode dedicated to Edward Mulhare who died earlier that year.
5	"Inside Traitor"	Spiro Razatos	Kevin Stevens & Marcus Miller	November 3, 1997
Erica's loyalty is questioned when she rejoins an elite gang of thieves during an undercover assignment.
6	"Choctaw L-9"	John Weidner	Story by : Steven Kriozere & Jefferson Smith; Teleplay by : Steven Kriozere	November 10, 1997
After a mishap, Kyle is suspended as leader of TKR and the rest of team must deal with a hardball FBI agent that replaces him while searching for a stolen prototype military helicopter.
7	"Everything to Fear"	Gil Wadsworth	Regge Bulman & Clay Eide	November 17, 1997
An assassin kidnaps Jenny and uses her to force TKR to work for him during his next hit.
8	"Sky One"	Spiro Razatos	Rick Copp & David A. Goodman	November 24, 1997
Sky One is hijacked by terrorists who threaten the TKR team's lives with a deadly nerve agent.
9	"The Iron Maiden"	Spiro Razatos	Steven Kriozere	December 1, 1997
The team must destroy three power-suited super-soldiers under Starr's control.
10	"Oil and Water"	John Weidner	Matthew Ball & Mark Greenhalgh	December 8, 1997
The team goes after an insane engineer bent on sabotaging the automotive industry.
11	"Et Tu, Dante?"	William Warren	Marcus Miller	January 5, 1998
While hunting down a terrorist bomber, the TKR vehicles are taken over by a strange computer virus and turn against their drivers.
12	"The Bad Seed"	William Warren	Regge Bulman & Clay Eide	January 12, 1998
The team goes after a mad scientist who threatens to poison the world's largest rivers.
13	"Out of the Past"	Scott McAboy	Marilyn Webber	January 19, 1998
Kyle's past comes to haunt him when the team discovers he is wanted for robbery in South America.
14	"The Return of Megaman"	Gil Wadsworth	Rick Copp & David A. Goodman	January 26, 1998
The team searches for a neutron bomb hidden in New Mexico that threatens to kill millions if detonated.
15	"Angels in Chains"	Gil Wadsworth	Story by : John Rozum; Teleplay by : John Rozum & Marcus Miller	February 3, 1998
Jenny is accused of government espionage and the rest of the team work to clear her of the allegations.
16	"The Blonde Woman"	Gil Wadsworth	Steven Kriozere	February 10, 1998
The team desperately hunts down an elusive assassin known as Eve before she can claim another victim.
17	"The Ixtafa Affair"	Gil Wadsworth	Marcus Miller	February 16, 1998
Jenny finds that an ex-boyfriend is involved with busting a Guatemalan drug lord from prison.
18	"Home Away From Home"	Jacques Haitkin	Rick Husky	February 23, 1998
The team works to capture a notorious hacker who has fled to a strange little town in Iowa before enemy agents intercept her first.
19	"E.M.P."	Spiro Razatos	John Ridley	April 27, 1998
TKR goes in search of a stolen Electro Magnetic Pulse weapon that can shut down electronics for miles.
20	"Apocalypse Maybe"	Gil Wadsworth	Story by : Bill Dial; Teleplay by : Bill Dial & Marcus Miller	May 4, 1998
The team goes after an insane reverend destined to destroy Las Vegas with an earthquake machine.
21	"Spy Girls"	Gil Wadsworth	Rick Copp & David A. Goodman	May 11, 1998
TKR must join forces with a team of undercover women in search of a stolen microfiche that contains the formula for a deadly nerve agent.
22	"Legion of Doom"	Gil Wadsworth	Steven Kriozere and Rick Copp & David A. Goodman	May 18, 1998
TKR has a showdown with a nemesis agent known as Mobius and his team of criminal masterminds who he has recently sprung from prison.

== See also ==
Team Knight Rider vehicles

- Knight Rider franchise
