= Knight Rider (2008 TV series) =

2008 TV series

- Genre: Action
- Based on: Characters by Glen A. Larson
- Developed by: Dave Andron
- Starring: Justin Bruening; Deanna Russo; Sydney Tamiia Poitier; Paul Campbell; Yancey Arias; Bruce Davison; Smith Cho
- Voices of: Val Kilmer as 'KITT'; Peter Cullen as 'KARR' 2.0 (Knight to King's Pawn)
- Theme music composer: Christopher Tyng
- Composer: Christopher Tyng
- Country of origin: United States
- Original language: English
- No. of seasons: 1
- No. of episodes: 17 + TV movie

Production
- Executive producers: David Bartis; Glen A. Larson; Doug Liman; Matt Pyken; Gary Scott Thompson; Marc Ceccarelli
- Running time: 42 minutes
- Production companies: Dutch Oven Productions; Universal Media Studios; Gary Scott Thompson Productions

Original release
- Network: NBC
- Release: September 24, 2008 – March 4, 2009

Related
- Knight Rider (1982); Knight Rider (2008 film)

Knight Rider is an American action television series that follows the 1982 television series of the same title created by Glen A. Larson and the 2008 television movie. The series aired on NBC from September 24, 2008 to March 4, 2009. The series stars Justin Bruening as Michael Traceur, the estranged son of Michael Knight; at the end of the pilot episode, Traceur renames himself Michael Knight II. The series also stars Deanna Russo as Sarah Graiman, Traceur's former girlfriend and love interest. Sarah is the daughter of Charles Graiman, played by Bruce Davison, is the creator of a new generation of KITT (Knight Industries Three Thousand), which is voiced by Val Kilmer and based on a Ford Mustang Shelby GT500KR. The series was in production for one season.

== Plot ==
Continuing from the pilot movie, Mike Traceur is partnered with KITT and works for Knight Industries Research and Development, a secret intelligence agency overseen by NSA Agent Alex Torres and FBI Agent Carrie Rivai. Other team members include Charles Graiman, his daughter Sarah Graiman, and Tech Specialists Billy Morgan and Zoe Chae. During the first episode, the mission is compromised by people who claim to be associates of Mike but of whom he has no recollection. Mike reveals that a significant chunk of his memory is missing due to an unexplained trauma, which coincides with a period when he stopped talking to Sarah. To end the damage, Carrie stages his "death"; thus Mike Traceur dies. Traceur renames himself Michael Knight II and continues his work with KITT.

== Cast ==
- Justin Bruening as Michael "Mike" Knight (originally known as Mike Traceur): the son of the original Michael Knight, driver of the first KITT
- Deanna Russo as Dr. Sarah Graiman: the daughter of Charles Graiman; romantic interest of Mike Knight
- Val Kilmer as the Voice of KITT: the artificially intelligent automobile. Will Arnett was originally cast for the voice of KITT and had his lines recorded, but he was later replaced by Val Kilmer.
- Paul Campbell as Billy Morgan
- Smith Cho as Zoe Chae (Episodes 13–17, Guest Star in Episodes 1–12)
- Bruce Davison as Dr. Charles Graiman: KITT's creator and Sarah's father (Episodes 1–12)
- Sydney Tamiia Poitier as FBI Agent Carrie Rivai (Episodes 1–11)
- Yancey Arias as NSA Agent Alex Torres (Episodes 1–12)
- Peter Cullen as the Voice of KARR 2.0, an evil, artificially intelligent automobile that can transform into a powerful humanoid robot with wheels for legs

== Production ==
=== Development ===
In the spring of 2007, NBCUniversal chief executive Jeff Zucker hired Ben Silverman as chief NBC programmer. He asked Silverman to help bring NBC out of last place in network ratings. One of Silverman's early moves was to try to revive old franchises like Knight Rider and American Gladiators. Silverman, in a deal endorsed by Ford Motor Company, the car supplier, approved production. In advance of its anticipated weekly run, the new Knight Rider series was introduced with a television movie on February 17, 2008. The new series premiered on NBC on September 24, 2008 and led the network's Wednesday evening lineup, along with Deal or No Deal and Lipstick Jungle. On October 21, 2008, NBC gave the show a full season order of 22 episodes, where all of the episodes that aired on TV are also available on NBC, the PlayStation Network Video Store, Xbox Live Marketplace, Hulu Plus (available only for computer streaming, not TV or mobile streaming), and iTunes Store. The episodes are available in high-definition and standard-definition formats.

=== Retooling ===
On November 10, 2008, NBC reformatted the show in an effort to more closely resemble the storyline of its predecessor. Starting with a two-part episode airing in January 2009, Yancey Arias, Bruce Davison, and Sydney Tamiia Poitier's characters were removed from the series after the end of the actors' original thirteen episode commitment. The show continued with a more character-driven focus on Michael and KITT.

=== Cancellation ===
On December 3, 2008, NBC reduced its season order from 22 to 17 episodes. The series finale aired on March 4, 2009. On May 19, 2009, NBC canceled the series after one season.

=== Vehicle ===
For the series premiere, many new features in KITT were introduced in addition to those seen on the pilot movie. As an homage to the original KITT's Super Pursuit Mode, the new KITT transforms into Attack Mode – a significantly more aggressive version than the Attack Mode depicted in the pilot movie, which consisted primarily of an extended rear spoiler. KITT also transforms into a Ford F-150 FX4 pickup truck for off-road purposes, a Ford E-150 van, Ford Flex, Ford Crown Victoria Police Interceptor, and a 1969 Mach 1 Mustang for disguise purposes. The series also demonstrated capabilities such as KITT's Turbo Boost, allowing KITT to briefly become airborne, and submergibility, maintaining system integrity and life support for occupants while underwater. Also installed in KITT are a grappling hook, a laser that originates from his scanner bar, double mini-guns, defensive flares, offensive missiles, parachute, a dart gun, a sonic inhibitor and an EMP weapon.

The interior of the vehicle has been reworked, with the single display screen on the center console replaced by touch-enabled head-up displays spanning the entire interior surface of the windshield. The removal of the center console screen has also seen KITT's "presence" indicator, reminiscent of the original series KITT's voice modulator, appearing in a pulsing orb mounted high in the middle of the dashboard with a dot in the middle that shifts over to "look" at whoever he's talking to. Other interior changes include a more conventional steering wheel, replacing the previously seen 3/4 steering wheel, blue lighting in the dashboard over the driver's-side instrumentation and the passenger-side console that becomes red whenever KITT is in Attack Mode, and a standard Mustang rear seat instead of the super-computer laden rear seat of the movie KITT. The interior of 4x4 Mode uses the same customized Mustang dashboard, but the F-150's passenger and driver's seats. KITT also carries a backup mainframe that he can reboot to in the event his primary is damaged. KITT's mechanics are high-tech industrial robots named Katie, Lisa, and Hank. They scan KITT for damages and interact with the human actors.

KITT's technology includes a surface screen program, enabling the hood to operate as a touchscreen display, similar to the internal head-up displays, a printer in the passenger-side console, and a 3D Object Generator in the rear passenger compartment, as well as a self-destruct program.

== Episodes ==
No.	Title	Directed by	Written by	Original air date	Prod. code	U.S. viewers (millions)
1	"A Knight in Shining Armor"	David Solomon	Gary Scott Thompson	September 24, 2008	KR‑101	7.349
Mike Traceur and KITT go after a mysterious group who abducted a man whose DNA contains a key to an unbreakable code. Whilst on the hunt, Mike realises the group are people connected to his past: a past he has no memory of after disappearing and suffering some kind of trauma. He also learns that before disappearing he proposed to Sarah, but he has no recollection of this. A mysterious woman who is directly linked to Mike tries to leverage him, but realises he doesn't know her. During a final confrontation, Carrie shoots Mike supposedly dead and lets the woman escape, so the world thinks Mike Traceur is dead. In the spirit of fresh starts, Mike chooses to become Mike Knight II and he and Sarah agree to wipe the slate of their past clean.
2	"Journey to the End of the Knight"	David Straiton	Philip Levens	October 1, 2008	KR‑103	7.766
Mike seeks the help of a former military buddy in a mission to infiltrate a drag race smuggling ring, resulting in KITT being seriously damaged and Mike having to steal a rare hypercar to replace one that was totalled in the race. Sarah learns that the smuggling ring are into more dangerous things than they believes, but also that the friend may have smuggling ties of his own.
3	"Knight of the Iguana"	Bryan Spicer	Rob Wright	October 8, 2008	KR‑105	6.856
To try and locate a missing US undercover operative, Mike and Zoe (Smith Cho) pose as a couple to infiltrate a terrorist group in Baja California, suspected of stealing a powerful weapons. They are assisted by a helpful local (Johann Urb), who Mike quickly determines is actually part of the group, revealed to be a team of former Soldiers. When Billy and Sarah come to help, they learn the weapons include an experimental missile designed by Knight Research. Now they must stop a devastating terror attack on the US, but things get complicated between the girls when Sarah learns that whilst drunk, Mike and Zoe slept together.
4	"A Hard Day's Knight"	Allan Kroeker	Dave Andron	October 15, 2008	KR‑104	7.470
When Sarah asks Mike to escort her to her friends wedding, Torres gives Mike a supposedly simple mission: pose as a courier for a mysterious tycoon. Unfortunately, Mike is injected with a neural poison as an incentive to complete the job, and has less than three hours to live but the tycoon disappears with the antidote. As the poison starts to set in, Mike starts unwillingly telling the truth which leads to his embarrassment. As Sarah tries to find a cure, Mike and KITT follow the clues which leads to an assassination plan. Mike learns that the only way to save his life is for him to assassinate a billionaire tech mogul in order to set in motion events which will uncover the mastermind, but does he have the strength and time to do it?
5	"Knight of the Hunter"	Jay Chandrasekhar	Patrick Massett & John Zinman	October 22, 2008	KR‑107	7.226
KITT disguises as a 4x4 for an off-road mission as Mike is assigned to investigate a right-wing militia group led by PMC leader Walt Cooperton, who started the group after the Department of Defence ended his contract for unknown reasons, which puts a hold on Mike's plans to take Sarah out for her birthday. Posing as a disgruntled Marine, Mike manages to get himself invited into the group after being tortured by Right-hand man Oren Moss and Coopertons girlfriend, Cassandra. Mike's search of Coopertons' personal belongings, which include Armani suits and $6000 French wine, lead him to conclude is he isn't actually the radicalist they believe. Unfortunately, after he finds large quantities of explosives are somewhere in the camp, he is caught by Cassandra who reveals herself to be an undercover British secret agent posing as one of them. As Mike, Cassandra and KITT try to escape, KITT is severely damaged and forces the others to leave him and meet up later. As they learn that the group are leaving the compound on a mission, KITT discovers that Mike suspicions were right: Cooperton and Moss are Mercenaries wanted for bank robberies around the world, but why are they leading a militia-group, and why will they do with their explosives?
6	"Knight of the Living Dead"	Leslie Libman	Gary Scott Thompson	November 5, 2008	KR‑108	5.124
Halloween fun turns dark when a murderous hacker infiltrates the Knight headquarters and activates a self-destruct program hidden inside KITT. Meanwhile, Mike and Sarah have 30 minutes to relay KITT's software to the back-up system and try and disarm the bomb while the others rush to find a killer among them. During the download, KITT and Mike learn that the self-destruct was created after the failure of the 'original prototype': Knight Auto Cybernetic Roving Robotic Exoskeleton (or KARR for short), but Mike is distracted by the haunting feelings of familiarity he gets when he hears the name KARR. Note: This episode reveals schematics of a re-imagined KARR who is once again similar to KITT as a returning nemesis.
7	"I Wanna Rock & Roll All Knight"	Matt Earl Beesley	Rachel Mellon & Teresa Huang	November 12, 2008	KR‑106	5.342
Mike, Sarah and KITT are assigned on a mission to catch a criminal couple, Max and Nikki, who has been blowing up buildings, but when they end up in a standoff they are stopped from firing because Nikki is revealed to be a congressman's daughter, though she has no problems shooting Mike. During the hunt, Billy and Zoe occupy themselves by betting on the outcome at certain points of the case and also, recognising the increasing sexual tension between Mike and Sarah, use the case to teach KITT about relationships. After creative investigation allows them to learn their next target, they end up in another standoff which this time results in Max abandoning Nikki to allow his escape. Unfortunately, this turns out to be a complex ruse to allow Nikki to steal the classified personnel files of everyone at the SSC and then kidnap Agent Rivai. With the impending threat of their secure files being uploaded to the Internet, Mike and KITT must race to find them and save the day.
8	"Knight of the Zodiac"	J. Miller Tobin	Matt Pyken	November 19, 2008	KR‑109	5.205
After capturing a bank robber, Mike goes undercover in his place to Las Vegas to bust a money laundering operation run by a gang who only know each other by signs of the Zodiac, headed by 'Capricorn', who is posing as a Casino Chief-of-Security. Mike then ends up becoming embroiled in a daring casino heist. Billy joins the mission only to spark a romantic adventure of his own. Meanwhile, Dr. Graiman locks horns with an old rival and former flame who comes to assess how "green" the SSC is. Mike manages to successfully escape with the money, but unfortunately because he was better at his job than the actual robber, the others realize he is a fraud. Mike then discovers 'Capricorn' is actually running a complex con to allow him to keep his casino job, and is saved by Billy and KITT.
9	"Knight Fever"	Milan Cheylov	Matt Pyken	December 31, 2008	KR‑102	4.540
Mike must stop the spread of a computer nanovirus that destroys electronics and threatens a global meltdown. However Torres initially denies the problem and blames KITT. The job gets more complicated when KITT is infected and suffers a series of malfunctions. Meanwhile, Mike's jealousy begins to show when Sarah reconnects with a former boyfriend (guest star Jeffrey Pierce), one of the developers of the virus and the only one who knows how to stop it. Billy and Zoe also discuss that Torres has been secretly planning something, and it involves KARR.
10	"Don't Stop the Knight"	Bryan Spicer	Rob Wright	January 7, 2009	KR‑110	5.736
Mike tries to save a kidnapped foreign ambassador (guest star Vanessa A. Williams) from a terrorist who sends Mike on a series of missions to acquire parts for a hafnium nuclear bomb. Meanwhile, Dr. Graiman tries to fix a temperamental robot named HANK. Agent Rivai eventually tracks down the terrorist's hide out but is caught in an explosion when a trip-wire bomb goes off.
11	"Day Turns into Knight"	Allan Kroeker	Dave Andron	January 14, 2009	KR‑111	5.378
While Rivai clings to life, Mike and KITT transport the terrorist's nuclear bomb, but to keep it from detonating they must maintain a speed over 100 MPH. The bomb is transferred, without stopping, to a C-130 transport plane and harmlessly detonated at high-altitude. Afterward, Mike learns of a second bomb located at a chemical plant in Phoenix, Arizona and he and Sarah rush to intercept it. At the end, Sarah learns her father was killed when the damaged C-130 explodes during an emergency landing. Note: This was the last appearance of Dr. Graiman (Bruce Davison) and Agent Rivai (Sydney Tamiia Poitier).
12	"Knight to King's Pawn"	Jeffrey G. Hunt	Patrick Massett & John Zinman	January 21, 2009	KR‑112	4.928
While Sarah grieves over the loss of her father, Agent Torres (Yancey Arias) and the NSA dismantle the SSC and KITT's AI chip is removed to be installed in his evil predecessor KARR, (once again voiced by Peter Cullen), who is being kept at Area 51. In a secret message left by Dr. Graiman, Mike learns that he was the original operator of KARR but his memories of the events were erased after KARR went on a killing spree brought on by corrupted files, and that Torres' belief that KITT's files will override KARR's is a mistake and a disaster waiting to happen. To save himself, KITT secretly uploads his files to the internet and Billy and Zoe try to piece him back together. Mike infiltrates Area 51 and installs KITT's reconstructed AI into KITT's body. KARR, who can transform into a humanoid robot with wheels for legs, forcefully seizes Torres as his new operator and has a final confrontation with Mike and KITT. Torres dies in the final battle. Meanwhile, Sarah uncovers a windfall of funds secretly left by her father, whose ultimate plan was for her to restart The Foundation for Law and Government at the SSC. Note: This was the last appearance of Agent Torres (Yancey Arias). Dr. Graiman (Bruce Davison) appears in recorded messages to Mike and Sarah. Guest Star: Peter Cullen as voice of KARR 2.0
13	"Exit Light, Enter Knight"	Gary Scott Thompson	Gary Scott Thompson	January 28, 2009	KR‑117	6.229
Mike tries to stop a bank heist, but is taken hostage and loses contact with KITT. While inside the vault, Mike learns the thieves didn't come for the money, but what is inside a mob lawyer's safety deposit box – the account numbers and access codes to his clients' off-shore bank accounts. As a SWAT team closes in, KITT tries to warn them of bombs planted in the building and Mike tries to foil the robbers' escape plans. Things get complicated when Mike discovers that one of the hostages is in allegiance with the criminals.
14	"Fight Knight"	Nick Gomez	Rob Wright	February 4, 2009	KR‑115	4.996
Mike goes to Colorado to help an Army friend (Meghan Markle) investigate the murder of her former drill sergeant (guest star Tiki Barber), and follows leads that the soldier may have been involved in an underground fight club that exploits military veterans. Mike attempts to secure secret footage of the fight that the drill sergeant was in get complicated when he ends up in the ring with his friend against two champions.
15	"Fly by Knight"	Jay Chandrasekhar	Dave Andron	February 11, 2009	KR‑116	5.482
Mike tries to rescue a kidnapped boy-genius who knows the location of a hidden stash of drugs stolen from a drug dealer. The boy leaves behind puzzling clues that Mike and KITT must solve in order to find him. Complicating things is the DEA agent (guest star Maria Menounos) assigned to the case who has Mike arrested for interfering.
16	"Knight and the City"	Guy Norman Bee	Matt Pyken	February 18, 2009	KR‑114	5.317
During his allotted downtime, Mike takes KITT to his favorite hangout "Sonny's Bar", but when he arrives is upset to discover the owner Sonny Nelson was killed in a car accident. He learns Sonnys daughter and his old friend Julie has taken over after abandoning her promising career in medicine, and the place has been taken over by an unsavory crowd and there has been a rash of mysterious fires lately. Mike immediately sets to work as the new bouncer: disperses a rough mob by breaking a members nose, and has Sarah and the others look into the fires and crash. KITT has his own troubles when a pair of thugs try to steal him repeatedly, however it is during one of their attempts that he discovers something which proves that Sonny's Bar is far more valuable than anyone imagined. And also why someone is trying to force Julie out.
17	"I Love the Knight Life"	Alex Zakrzewski	Philip Levens	March 4, 2009	KR‑113	5.679
In their first official mission for the Foundation for Law And Government, Mike and KITT try to procure a stolen high-tech serum called HXP that enhances physical abilities before the thieves can sell it to North Korean buyers. When Mike corners Galt, the main suspect, he finds Galt has overdosed on the serum and possesses super-human strength. Meanwhile Sarah is busy trying to reestablish the connections to the government systems, and must turn to an unexpected source for help.

On December 3, 2008, NBC reduced its season order to seventeen episodes. The series finale aired on March 4, 2009. On May 19, 2009, NBC announced that they would not renew Knight Rider for a second season.

== Home media ==
Knight Rider: The Complete Series DVD was released on July 28, 2009 on a four disc set with bonus material.

== See also ==
- Knight Rider
