= Christine Steel =

American actress

- Born: Riverside, New Jersey, U.S.
- Occupation: Actor
- Years active: 1997–2002

Christine Steel is a former American actress, known for her role of Jenny Andrews on the TV series Team Knight Rider as well as the Tiberium Mutant Umagon in Command & Conquer: Tiberian Sun.

== Early life ==
Steel was born in Riverside, New Jersey, and spent the majority of her life in San Francisco. Steel's ancestry is combined Asian, Native American, Latino, and Italian.

== Career ==
She began acting at age 15 where she performed the role of Anita in her community theater's production of West Side Story. She attended UCLA, where she graduated cum laude in theater arts. Her other television credits include The District and 18 Wheels of Justice. Her film credits include roles in The Last Late Night and Even Steven. Steel also appears in the CD-ROM games Command & Conquer: Tiberian Sun and Riven: The Sequel to Myst.

After retiring from acting in 2002, she has worked as a realtor in San Francisco. (3.)

== Filmography ==
Year	Title	Role	Notes
2002	The District	Arlene Gomez	Episode: "Explicit Activities"
2002	Even Steven	Unknown	Film
2000	Big Wind on Campus	Andre'a Parker	Film
2000	Coverage	Jordan	Short film
2000	18 Wheels of Justice	Angel	Episode: "Games of Chance"
1999	The Last Late Night	Kate	Film
1999	Command & Conquer: Tiberian Sun	Umagon	Video game
1997–98	Team Knight Rider	Jenny Andrews	Main star, 22 episodes
1997	Riven: The Sequel to Myst	Nelah	Video game
