= Knight Rider 2000 =

1991 television film directed by Alan J. Levi

- Promotional poster
- Genre: Action; Adventure; Science fiction
- Based on: Characters created by Glen A. Larson
- Written by: Rob Hedden
- Directed by: Alan J. Levi
- Starring: David Hasselhoff; Edward Mulhare
- Theme music composer: Jan Hammer
- Country of origin: United States
- Original language: English

Production
- Executive producer: Michele Brustin
- Producers: Rob Hedden; Charles Sellier
- Production locations: San Antonio; Corpus Christi, Texas; Universal Studios
- Cinematography: Billy Dickson
- Editor: Barry B. Leirer
- Running time: 91 minutes
- Production companies: Charles E. Sellier Productions; River Rock Productions; Universal Television
- Budget: $6,500,000

Original release
- Network: NBC
- Release: May 19, 1991

Knight Rider 2000 is a 1991 American made-for-television science fiction action film based on the 1982–1986 television series Knight Rider.

== Overview ==
In the year 2000, conventional handguns have been banned, with law enforcement carrying non-lethal "ultrasound" pistols. Nationwide budget changes have resulted in the adoption of cryonic suspension over standard incarceration for convicted criminals. Following the assassination of a mayor in San Antonio, his replacement demands a solution, which is found in the form of the "Knight 4000", a car that will become the next generation of the Knight Industries' supercar KITT.

== Plot ==
Thomas J. Watts is released from prison and assassinates the mayor. Police officer Shawn McCormick confronts the masked Watts holding the next mayor at gunpoint. She shoots Watts, who flees. The city's new mayor demands the gunman be found, while his councilmen reprimand him for disarming the police and setting up the cryo-prison where the inmates "sleep away" their sentences and emerge the same people as before.

The Knight Foundation, created from a combination of Knight Industries and the Foundation for Law and Government, offers a possible solution – the "Knight 4000". Devon Miles and his partner, Russel Maddock, are green-lit on the idea, but the city wants to see a working prototype. Devon brings in Michael Knight as the test driver. The Knight 4000 has most of KITT's original features, but adds an amphibious mode that allows the car to drive on water, a heads-up display, and a stun device that can remotely incapacitate a human.

Watts shoots Shawn after she discovers that some of her colleagues are working with the assassin to rearm criminals so the city will give the police their guns back. Doctors save Shawn by installing a microchip implant into her brain. She recovers, but cannot remember the details of the attack.

Michael is furious that KITT has been dismantled and rebuilds KITT's AI unit, which is difficult since Maddock has sold most of KITT's technology to medical research. He reactivates KITT's logic module and installs him in the dashboard of his 1957 Chevrolet Bel Air.

Shawn quits the police force after she learns her chief, Daniels, did not want to authorize her brain chip implant nor get involved in her case. She seeks employment with the Foundation, and Michael learns one of KITT's cybernetic chips is in her head. KITT links up with the chip and extracts her missing memories. Shawn remembers that Watts shot her and that her fellow officers were with him, including her partner.

Image of the Knight 4000 in an in-film presentation

Watts learns Shawn is alive and sends the corrupt cops to eliminate her and Michael, who are chased down when they try fleeing in KITT. KITT helps them evade capture by driving off a pier where he quickly sinks. Michael and Shawn are safe, but KITT is damaged when water enters his circuitry. With Watts believing Michael and Shawn dead, he captures Devon and uses mind scanning technology to discover what Devon knows, killing him afterward.

Michael and Shawn swim to safety and return to the Foundation, learning of Devon's death. After Devon's funeral, the mayor terminates FLAG's contract. Michael quits, but after Shawn confronts him, he returns and retrofits the Knight 4000 with KITT's AI.

Michael and Shawn follow her former partner to a warehouse where guns are stored. Shawn arranges a gun transaction with her former partner. Before he can cooperate with FLAG's investigation, Watts shoots him. Michael saves Shawn from being killed.

Maddock sends KITT a copy of the prison release papers for Watts, signed by the murdered mayor. Michael has KITT print more copies, sending one with a fake signature to Daniels using her name, and a similar one to the mayor, this time with his name. Following the mayor's limo, they record a conversation between the mayor and Watts discussing the papers.

After ambushing a caravan of corrupt cops, they find no guns. KITT informs Michael there is another group of police cars headed for the local mall. Maddock convinces Daniels to allow KITT to pursue them.

Watts has begun a transaction with a gun buyer. When one of the corrupt cops guarding Watts sights Shawn moving in, he shoots her, and the buyer and Watts flee. Michael catches up to Watts and disarms him. A fight ensues between Michael and Watts, Michael only stopping when Watts picks up his handgun. Shawn, only slightly wounded, arrives with the other handgun, instructing Watts to drop his. Michael talks Shawn down from shooting Watts. Watts then draws another gun hidden under his coat but Michael draws out an ultrasound gun and shoots Watts, who falls to his death.

After Watts' defeat, the mayor is incarcerated, Michael returns to retirement, and KITT remains at the Knight Foundation with Shawn and Maddock. The trio continue their police work.

== Cast ==
- David Hasselhoff as Michael Knight
- William Daniels as the Voice of KITT
- Carmen Argenziano as Russell Maddock/Voice of Knight 4000
- Lou Beatty Jr. as Mayor Harold Abbey
- Chris Bonno as Andrew
- Megan Butler as Officer Marla Hedges
- Robert F. Cawley as Prison Guard
- Eugene Clark as Officer Kurt Miller
- James Doohan as Himself
- Francis Guinan as Dr. Jeffrey Glassman
- Philip Hafer as Charlie (as Phillip Hafer)
- Christine Healy as Commissioner Ruth Daniels
- Carolyn G. Jackson as Bag Lady
- Ron Jackson as Highway Police Officer
- Stacy Lundgren as Sandy
- Matthew Menger as Shawn's Father (as Matt Menger)
- Paul Menzel as Businessman
- J.W. Moore IV as Medical Technician
- Edward Mulhare as Devon Miles
- Edwin Neal as Warehouse Clerk
- John Cannon Nichols as Lieutenant Justin Strand
- Susan Norman as Officer Shawn McCormick
- Marco Perella as Police Sergeant
- Mitch Pileggi as Thomas J. Watts
- Ellis Posey as Mayor Frank Cottam
- Larry Roop as Police Officer
- Lori Swierski as Lori

=== Cameo ===
Actor James Doohan makes a cameo appearance as an innocent bystander that KITT mistakes for a criminal stealing money from an ATM. KITT stuns the suspect and the man collapses. When Michael and Maddock pick up the man to arrest him, they find Mr. Doohan, delirious (from being stunned), and mumbling various lines from his role of Scotty on Star Trek.

== Production ==
=== Development ===
The theme tune, "Knight Rider 2000", by Jan Hammer was released on his 1994 album Drive.

The studio was unable to use the real Pontiac Banshee IV concept car for the movie, so instead it hired Jay Ohrberg Star Cars Inc. to customize a 1991 Dodge Stealth for the Knight 4000. After filming wrapped, the custom car was used on other TV productions of the time and can also be seen, albeit briefly, as a stolen supercar in CHiPs '99, a future police vehicle in Power Rangers Time Force, and in an episode of the television series Black Scorpion in 2001. After lying abandoned and unmaintained for 10 years, one of the cars was offered for sale in January 2021 by Bob's Prop Shop in Las Vegas.

It was filmed in San Antonio, Texas and features some of the city's landmarks such as the Botanical Gardens, the Tower of the Americas and Shops at Rivercenter (then known as Rivercenter Mall).

Because David Hasselhoff was already committed to Baywatch, he wouldn't have been available to play Michael Knight full time had Knight Rider 2000 actually made it to series. Hasselhoff as a compromise, suggested to NBC entertainment chief Brandon Tartikoff to do four Knight Rider movies-of-the-week. NBC ultimately said to Hasselhoff that they were going to make movies-of-the-week for Knight Rider just like he suggested. But as it turned out, NBC ordered Universal to produce just one movie-of-the-week instead of four. Universal replied by saying that they couldn't figure out how to make money unless they make at least two films and produce them back-to-back. When NBC refused to order more than one movie, that effectively ended this particular Knight Rider revival.

== Reaction ==
Although the ratings for Knight Rider 2000 were excellent, when NBC tested the audience reaction to Susan Norman, who was expected to front-line this proposed new Knight Rider series, she was given a thumbs down. According to David Hasselhoff, Knight Rider 2000 missed the point of the original series and had taken the wrong direction. Instead, the story is about a former cop turned psychotic killer who brings terror to the city of San Antonio in the year 2000.

== Home media ==
As well as being available as a single DVD, it is included in the Region 1, Region 2 and Region 4 versions of the Knight Rider Season One box set.

== See also ==
- Knight Rider franchise
