= Edward Mulhare =

Irish American actor (1923–1997)

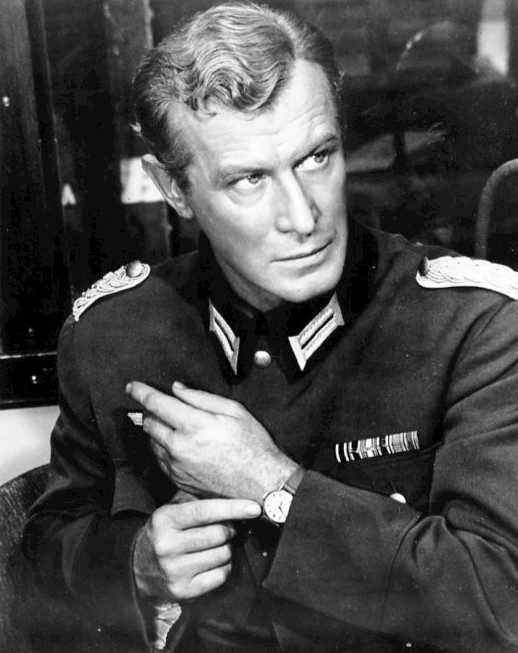
- Mulhare in Von Ryan's Express (1965)
- Born: 8 April 1923; 22 Quaker Road, Cork, Ireland
- Died: 24 May 1997 (aged 74); Van Nuys, California, U.S.
- Occupation: Actor
- Years active: 1947–1997
- Height: 188 cm (6 ft 2 in)

Edward Mulhare (8 April 1923 – 24 May 1997) was an Irish actor whose career spanned five decades. He is best known for his starring roles in two television series, sitcom The Ghost & Mrs. Muir (1968-70) and action drama Knight Rider (1982-86).

== Early life and career ==
Mulhare, one of three brothers, was born at 22 Quaker Road, Cork City, County Cork, Ireland, to John and Catherine (née Keane) Mulhare. As a child, he received his education at St. Nessan's Christian Brothers School, and later North Monastery. Mulhare, as a young adult, began schooling at the National University of Ireland in medicine, but eventually decided upon a career in theatre. After acting in various Irish venues including the Gate Theatre in Dublin, he moved to London, where he worked with Orson Welles and John Gielgud. He co-starred with Orson Welles in a 1951 production of Othello directed by Welles and produced by Laurence Olivier, and played in Pygmalion before going to America.

In 1955 Mulhare starred as James Finnegan in the first feature film produced in Israel, Hill 24 Doesn't Answer.

His best-known stage role was as Professor Higgins in the original Broadway production of My Fair Lady, having taken over the role from Rex Harrison in 1957. Mulhare was understudy to Harrison until that time, going on to play the part for three years in New York for 1,000 performances, then continuing the role on an international tour, which included an extensive tour of Russia. He continued to perform the role in summer theatres and for touring companies into the 1970s. A notable East Lansing, Michigan university campus performance of My Fair Lady was originally cancelled due to a blizzard, but played to a packed house of 4,000 when word was sent out that any student could get into the performance free, if they could get there. Many showed up on skis, as told by Mulhare and Anne Rogers on The Irv Kupcinet Show in a 1978 interview. Mulhare and Rogers continued their acting partnership, playing King Arthur and Guenevere in Camelot.

== Television ==
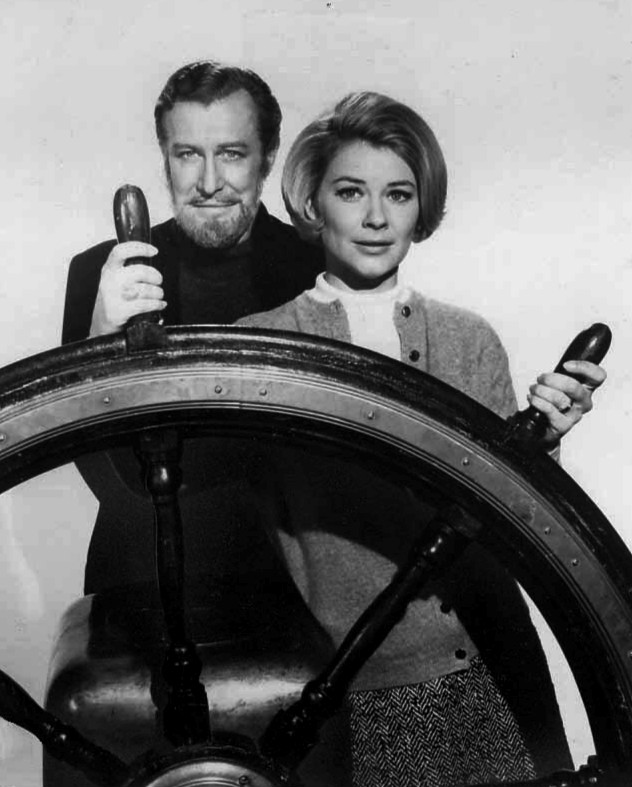
Mulhare (left) and Hope Lange in The Ghost & Mrs. Muir, in 1968

His first television appearance was in 1956 in a production of The Adventures of Robin Hood (Episode "The Imposters"). He was a guest panelist in 1958, and again in 1963, on the CBS television game show What's My Line?

By 1965, he was back in Hollywood appearing in films and television shows for 20th Century Fox. He earned roles in the films Von Ryan's Express in 1965, Our Man Flint in 1966, and Caprice in 1967. He guest-starred in television programmes, including Daniel Boone and the Twelve O'Clock High episode "Siren Voices" as Luftwaffe Colonel Kurt Halland. In The Ghost & Mrs. Muir, a supernatural sitcom that ran from 1968 to 1970, he starred as Captain Daniel Gregg, and again was something of a successor to Rex Harrison, who had originated the role of Captain Gregg in the original 1947 film.

In 1969 Mulhare starred in Gidget Grows Up, an American made-for-television comedy film with Karen Valentine in the title role. He played Alex MacLaughlin, a love interest for Gidget. Harlan Carraher, who played Jonathan Muir in The Ghost and Mrs Muir with Mulhare, had a small part as well.

He also guest-starred in "Experiment In Terra", an episode of the original Battlestar Galactica.

Mulhare co-starred as Devon Miles, director of the Foundation for Law and Government, on Knight Rider (1982–1986) alongside David Hasselhoff's Michael Knight.

In the mid-1980s, Mulhare hosted the television series Secrets & Mysteries, also called Secrets of the Unknown, a magazine show that examined historical mysteries and the paranormal.

== Later years ==
He starred in a number of films in his career including Megaforce and Out to Sea. His final role was on Baywatch Nights alongside former Knight Rider co-star David Hasselhoff in December 1996.

== Death ==
A heavy smoker, he died of lung cancer on 24 May 1997, aged 74, at his home in Van Nuys, California. He had been battling the cancer for five months prior to his death. Team Knight Rider dedicated an episode titled "K.R.O.", to Mulhare's memory (broadcast 27 October 1997). According to the annual magazine Who's Who in TV, 1968-1969, Mulhare was "a real ladies' man"; however, he remained a lifelong bachelor. He is buried in St. Joseph's Cemetery, Tory Top Road, Cork City, Ireland.

== Filmography ==
=== Film ===
Year	Title	Role	Notes
1947	Captain Boycott	Foster's Secretary	Uncredited
1955	Hill 24 Doesn't Answer	James Finnegan	
1965	Signpost to Murder	Mark Fleming	
1965	Von Ryan's Express	Captain Costanzo	
1966	Our Man Flint	Malcolm Rodney	
1966	Eye of the Devil	Jean-Claude Ibert	
1967	Caprice	Jason Fox	
1982	Megaforce	Edward Byrne-White	
1997	Out to Sea	Cullen Carswell	

=== Television ===
Year	Title	Role	Notes
1956	The Adventures of Aggie	Phillipe De Brie	Episode: "Peace and Quiet"
1956–1957	The Adventures of Robin Hood	Various characters	9 episodes
1963	The Outer Limits	Genetics Professor	Episode: "The Sixth Finger"
1963	Mr. Novak	Rand Hardy	Episode: "He Who Can Does"
1965–1967	Daniel Boone	Admiral Lord Clydesdale, Colonel Worthing, Colonel Burton	3 episodes
1968–1970	The Ghost & Mrs. Muir	Daniel Gregg	50 episodes
1969	Gidget Grows Up	Alex MacLaughlin	ABC Movie of the Week
1972	Search	David Pelham	Episode: "Operation Iceman"
1972–1974	The Streets of San Francisco	Brian Downing, Amory Gilliam	2 episodes
1974	Cannon	Neal Ray	Episode: "Death of a Hunter"
1976	Ellery Queen	Myles Prescott	Episode: "Adventure of the Two-Faced Woman"
1977	Hunter	Colin Berne	Episode: "Bluebird is Back"
1979	Battlestar Galactica	John	Episode: "Experiment in Terra"
1979	Hart to Hart	Arthur Sydney	Episode: "The Man with Jade Eyes"
1982–1986	Knight Rider	Devon Miles	86 episodes
1986	Murder, She Wrote	Julian Lord, Richard Bennett	2 episodes
1986	MacGyver	Guy Roberts	Episode: "Three for the Road"
1988–1989	Secrets & Mysteries	Self (Host)	Main role
1991	Knight Rider 2000	Devon Miles	Television film
1994	Spider-Man: The Animated Series	Spencer Smythe (voice)	Episode: "The Spider Slayer"
1995	Hart to Hart: Secrets of the Hart	Salisbury	Reunion TV Movie
1997	Baywatch Nights	Dr. Lancaster	Episode: "Frozen Out of Time"
