= Michael Knight (Knight Rider) =

Protagonist of the 1980s television series Knight Rider

- Knight Rider character
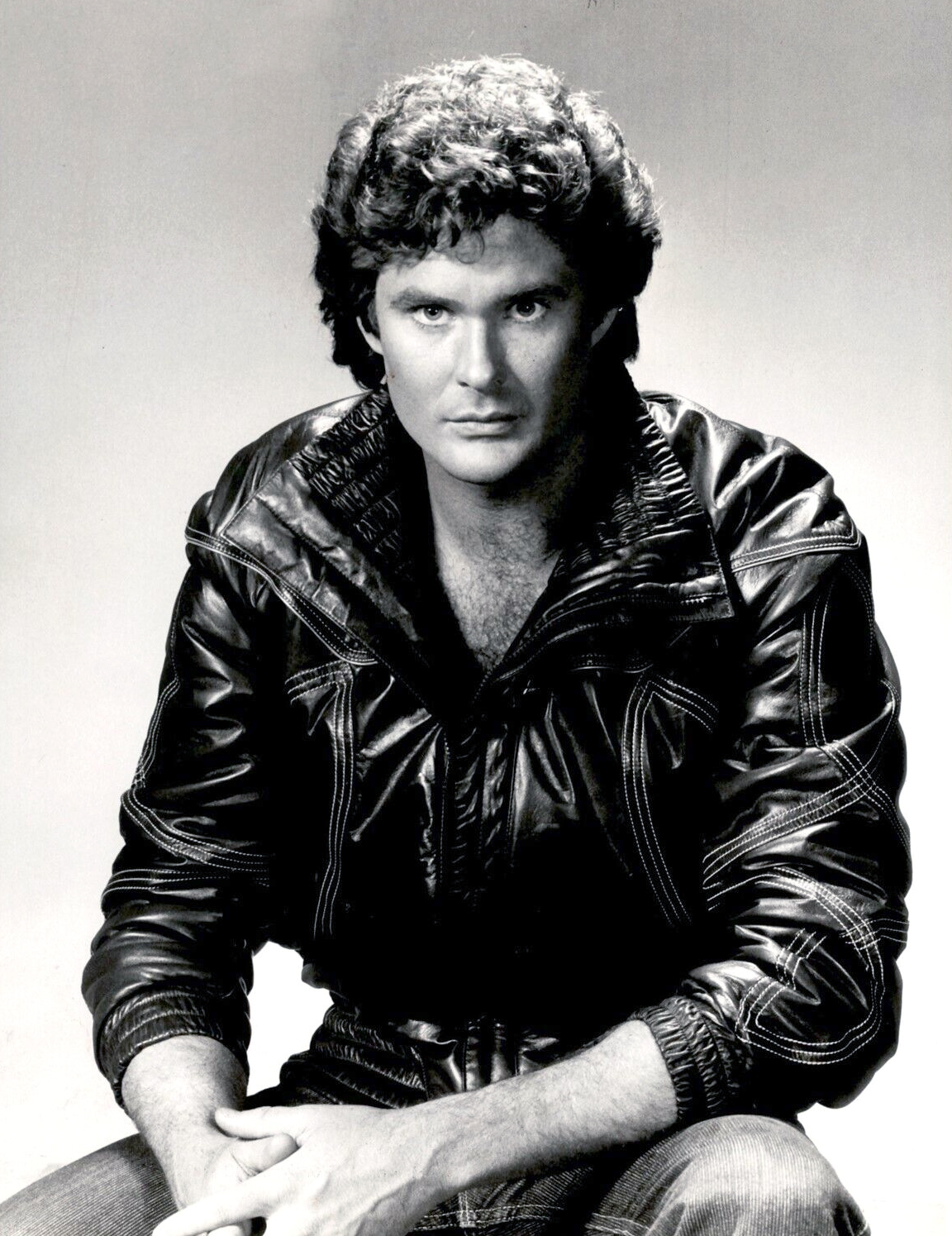
- Hasselhoff as Michael Knight in 1982 publicity photo
- First appearance: "Knight of the Phoenix"
- Last appearance: Knight Rider (2008 film)
- Portrayed by: David Hasselhoff; Larry Anderson (Michael Long, pilot only)

In-universe information
- Aliases: Michael Arthur Long; Michael Long
- Gender: Male
- Occupation: Police officer (1970s–1982); Army Intelligence officer (1970s; 1982–1990); Test driver (2000)
- Family: Garthe Knight ("twin-brother"); Jennifer Knight ("sister"); Wilton Knight (deceased "father"); Elizabeth Knight (estranged "mother")
- Spouses: Stephanie March Mason (girlfriend/wife, deceased); Jennifer Traceur (girlfriend, deceased)
- Children: Michael "Mike" Knight II (son)

Michael Knight is a fictional character and the protagonist of the 1980s television series Knight Rider, played by David Hasselhoff. The character first appeared in the opening scenes as Michael Long, played by Larry Anderson in the beginning of the pilot. His last appearance was in the 2008 film Knight Rider.

== Biography ==
=== Knight Rider ===
In the storyline of Knight Rider, Michael Arthur Long was born on January 9, 1949, outside Los Angeles, California, and raised by a blue-collar working family. In the 1960s, Michael joined the Army, spending three years in counter-intelligence work in Vietnam. He was captured while on a mission. Michael escaped but suffered a serious injury that required brain surgery, and a metal plate was inserted into his skull. Michael was later discharged from the service, returning to Los Angeles in the 1970s, where he joined the LAPD, starting as a patrolman, eventually becoming a detective lieutenant with the LAPD's 11th precinct. Michael resided at 1834 Shoreborne Avenue, Wilmington, California, in the zip code 90744.

In the pilot episode, Michael (played by Larry Anderson) is betrayed by an informant and shot in the head by industrial espionage expert Tanya Walker (Phyllis Davis). His metal plate deflected the round, but Michael suffered serious facial damage.

Michael was declared dead to the public, with his medical care taken over by FLAG (Foundation for Law And Government), a private crime-fighting arm of Knight Industries, an organization founded by Wilton Knight (Richard Basehart), a dying billionaire philanthropist. Michael was not Wilton's first choice for the pilot program, but changed his mind and reopened the foundation due to Michael's arrival. Wilton picks up Michael, passed out in front of his car, on a desert highway.

Michael is given a new face via facial reconstructive surgery, and is renamed Michael Knight (David Hasselhoff). Together with the high-tech automobile KITT (Knight Industries Two Thousand), Michael carries on Wilton's crusade of aiding the powerless. He is given mission objectives by the new director of FLAG, Wilton's longtime friend and confidant, Devon Miles (Edward Mulhare). Michael was selected for his high level of self-defense training, intelligence, law enforcement experience, and his ability and preference to work alone without assistance or back-up.

Michael avoided violence whenever possible and generally refrained from using firearms (although in several episodes he is seen with a .38 revolver and uses a MAC-10 when arresting some corrupt US Army troops). Although most of Knight's cases were based in Southern California, where FLAG was headquartered, the operation was not confined there, travelling to whatever part of the country trouble arose in, sometimes even crossing borders into Mexico. The organization also owned a semi-trailer truck that served as a mobile office offering technical support for KITT.

In addition to playing Michael Knight, Hasselhoff also played a double role in the Season Two feature-length episodes "Goliath" and "Goliath Returns", portraying not only Michael Knight but Wilton's biological son, Garthe Knight, who was imprisoned in Africa at the time of Michael's surgery. Believing that his son would never be seen again, Wilton had Michael's face modeled after Garthe's. The Garthe storyline didn't go beyond the second season as Hasselhoff requested that the doppelgänger villain be ended, due to the time it took to film both roles.

In 1984, Michael found out that the reason for him almost being shot in the pilot was having been the target of Tanya Walker's lover—and Wilton's long-standing enemy—Cameron Zachary (John Vernon). (In episode #47 of the two part "Knight of the Drones" it is revealed that FLAG had a prospective "Knight" driver prior to Michael who was murdered; however, this was never mentioned in any other episode.)

Michael loved women, including his former fiancée Stephanie "Stevie" March Mason (portrayed by Hasselhoff's actual wife at the time, Catherine Hickland), eventually marrying her (seen in the episode "Scent of Roses") on the same day she is killed. In a odd twist, in real life Hickland married Michael E. Knight after her divorce from Hasselhoff. Michael retired from FLAG in 1990 with Team Knight Rider taking over his duties.

=== Team Knight Rider ===
In the final episode of Team Knight Rider a mysterious man known as the "Shadow" appears, who Kyle suspects is actually Knight, explaining that nobody knows what happened to him. At the end of the episode, Team Knight Rider find Michael's grave. A man appears and tells them "I'm Michael Knight. Or at least I was."

=== Knight Rider 2000 ===
In a 1991 sequel movie Knight Rider 2000 Devon convinces Michael to join FLAG's project, the Knight 4000, as the test driver. Michael is furious to discover that KITT has been disassembled and is ready to walk away, but later decides to rebuild KITT's AI unit. At the end of the movie Michael returns to retirement.

=== Knight Rider (2008 TV series) ===
In the 2008 Knight Rider revival television movie, Michael Knight shows up at the funeral for his son's mother. He introduces himself to his estranged son, Michael Traceur, who asks if he will see Michael again. Michael replies, "I hope so."

Knight was again mentioned by Traceur in the first episode and reveals that his father's real name was Michael Long, with his co-workers making fun of it. Traceur decides to adopt the "Knight" family name in an attempt to start a new life, just like his father.

=== Other ===
Michael Knight appears as a playable character in Lego Dimensions, voiced by Piotr Michael.
