= KITT =

Fictional car in the 1980s television series Knight Rider

KITT or K.I.T.T. is the common name of two fictional characters from the action franchise Knight Rider. KITT is an artificially intelligent electronic computer module in the body of a highly advanced robotic automobile. The original KITT is known as the Knight Industries Two Thousand and appeared in the original TV series Knight Rider as a 1982 Pontiac Firebird Trans Am. The second KITT is known as the Knight Industries Three Thousand and appeared in the rebooted Knight Rider TV series and its two-hour 2008 pilot film, as a 2008–2009 Ford Shelby GT500KR.

== Knight Industries Two Thousand (KITT) ==
Knight Industries Two Thousand
- Knight Rider character
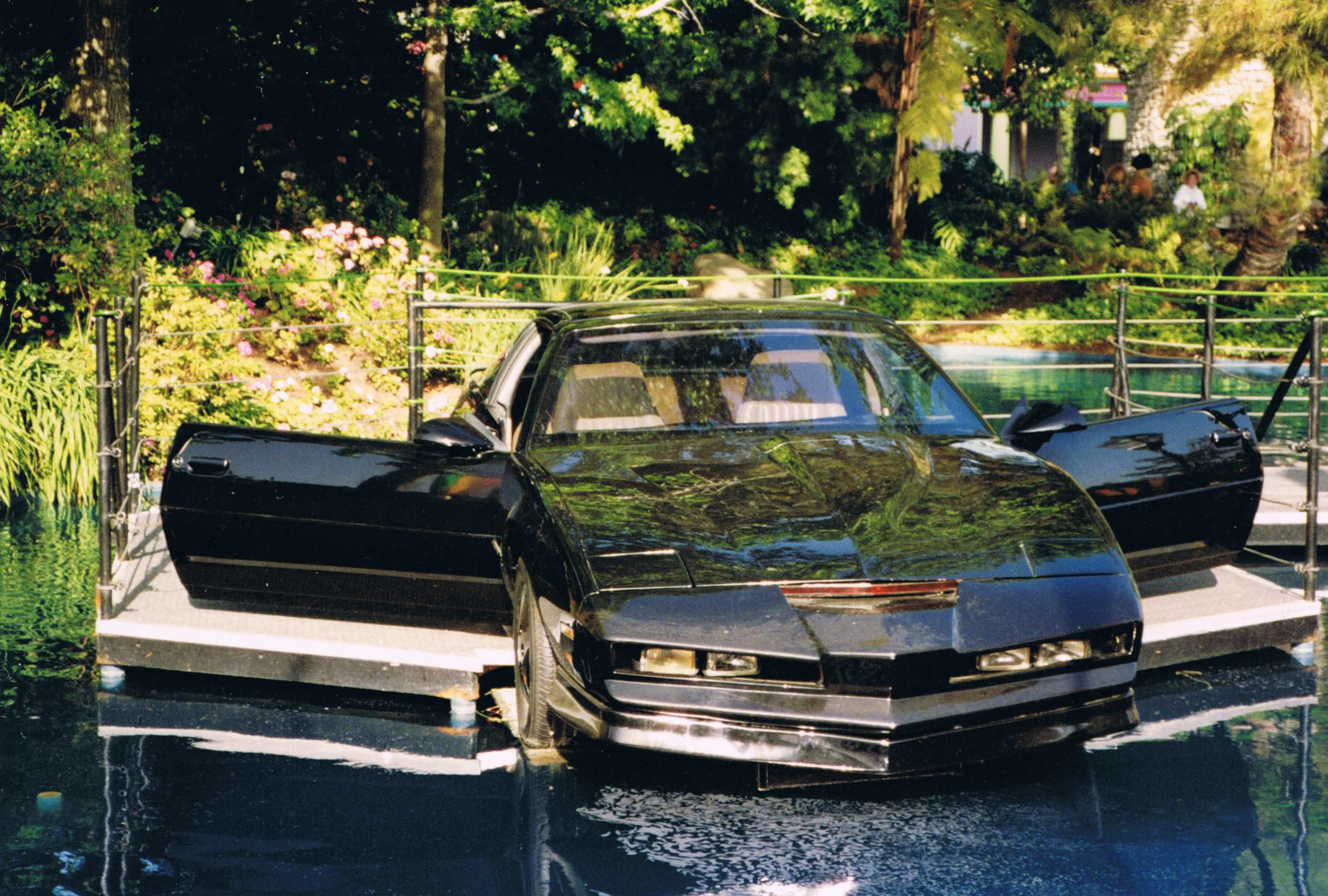
- KITT on display at Universal Studios in 1993. It was built as a stunt car for the original series and the interior was later modified for the Universal Studios attraction.
- First appearance: Knight of the Phoenix (Pt. 1)
- Created by: Glen A. Larson
- Portrayed by: Pontiac Firebird (third generation)
- Voiced by: William Daniels
- Nickname: KITT
- Species: Artificial Intelligence

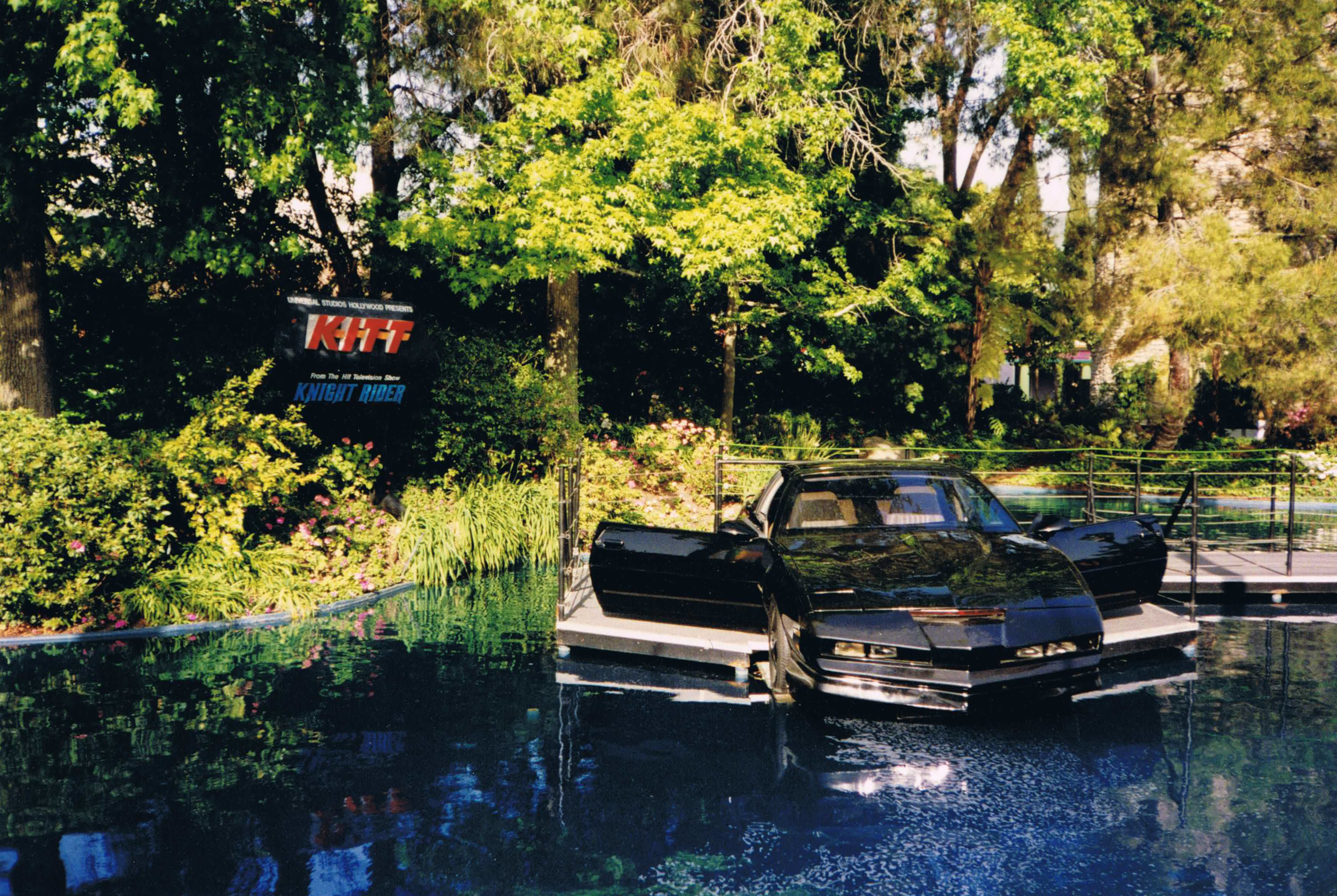
Wider view of the Universal Studios attraction

=== Design ===
In the original Knight Rider series, the character model for KITT was a modified 1982 Pontiac Trans Am, designed by customizer Michael Scheffe. The convertible and super-pursuit versions of KITT were designed and built by George Barris. The character was voiced by William Daniels.

In the universe of the television show, the original KITT (Knight 2000) was designed by Wilton Knight, a brilliant but eccentric billionaire, who established the Foundation for Law and Government (FLAG) and its parent Knight Industries. The 2008 film implies that Charles Graiman, creator of the later model Knight 3000, contributed to designing the original Knight 2000. KITT's initial production cost was estimated at $11,400,000 (in Episode 5, "Just My Bill"). In the 1991 movie Knight Rider 2000, the original Knight 2000 is destroyed and its microprocessor unit is transferred into its successor model, the Knight 4000, a modified 1991 Dodge Stealth.

=== Features ===
AI personality and communication

The original KITT's main cybernetic processor was installed in a mainframe computer used by the US government in Washington, D.C. Wilton Knight envisioned a better use for the computer in FLAG's crime-fighting crusade, so he installed the AI system into the vehicle that would become KITT.

KITT is an advanced supercomputer on wheels. The "brain" of KITT is the Knight 2000 microprocessor, which is the center of a "self-aware" cybernetic logic module. This allows KITT to think, learn, communicate and interact with humans. He is also capable of independent thought and action. He has an ego that is easy to bruise and is very sensitive, but his personality is kind and dryly humorous. According to Episode 55, "Dead of Knight", KITT has 1,000 megabits of memory with one nanosecond access time. According to Episode 65, "Ten Wheel Trouble", KITT's future capacity is unlimited. KITT's serial number is AD227529, as mentioned in Episode 31, "Soul Survivor".

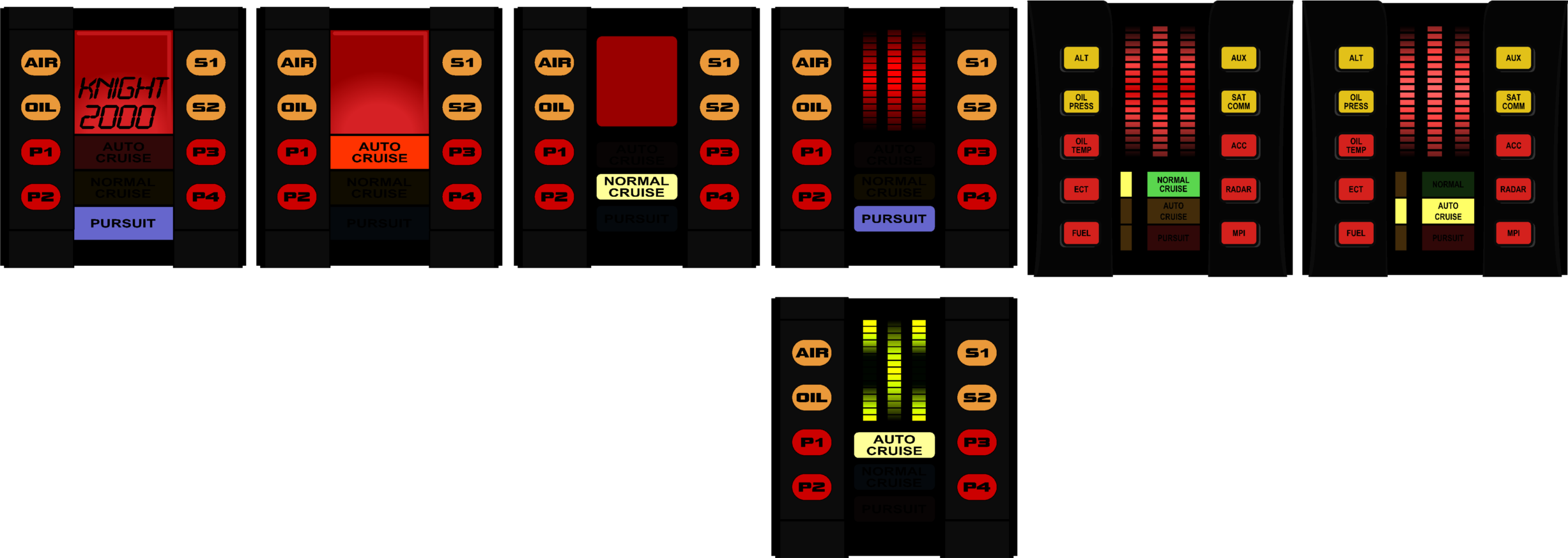
KITT and KARR Voice Modulator

KITT's Voice Anharmonic Synthesizer and Etymotic Equalizer allow his logic module to speak and communicate. With it, KITT can also simulate other sounds. KITT's primary spoken language is English; however, by accessing his language module, he can speak fluently in Spanish, French and other languages. The module can be adjusted, giving KITT different accents such as in Episode 82, "Out of the Woods", where KITT uses a "New York City" accent and called Michael "Micky". During the first season, KITT's "mouth" in the interior of the vehicle was indicated by a flashing red square. In episode 14 "Heart of Stone", this was changed to three sectioned vertical bars, a design that proved popular with fans. KITT can also project his voice through a loudspeaker as a form of ventriloquism (an ability first used in Episode 48, "Knight of the Drones, Pt. 2").

KITT has a hidden switch and setting dial under the dashboard that either completely shuts down his AI module or deactivates certain systems should the need arise (this was first used in Episode 17, "Chariot of Gold"). He also has a function which can be activated in order to completely lock the AI from accessing the vehicle controls (first used in Episode 8, "Trust Doesn't Rust"). KITT is still able to protest such actions vocally.

KITT is in constant contact with Michael via a comlink through a two-way communication wristwatch (a modified '80s LCD AM radio watch) Michael wears. The watch also has a micro camera and scanner that KITT can access to gather information. In an emergency, Michael can activate a secret homing beacon hidden inside his necklace, which sends a signal to remotely activate KITT and override his programming so that he rushes to Michael's aid (used in Episode 42, "A Good Knight's Work" and in "Knights of the Fast Lane").

Scanning and microwave jamming

KITT has a front-mounted scanner bar called the Anamorphic Equalizer. The device is a fibre-optic array of electronic eyes. The scanner can see in all visual wavelengths, X-ray, and infrared; its infrared tracking scope can monitor the position of specific vehicles in the area within 10 miles. Occasionally, the bar pulses in different patterns and speeds. Glen A. Larson, the creator of both Knight Rider and Battlestar Galactica, has stated that the scanner is a reference to the Battlestar Galactica characters, the Cylons; KITT even re-uses the iconic audio for the Cylon eye scanner.

When scanning in Surveillance Mode:

- KITT can detect people and vehicles and track their movements and discern proximity
- KITT can gather structural schematics of buildings, vehicles, or other devices to help Michael avoid potential danger
- KITT can monitor radio transmissions and telephone communications, and trace those calls
- KITT can monitor computer systems, or upload and download information as long as he can break the access codes

KITT's other sensors include:

- Audio and visual microscanners and sensors throughout his interior and exterior
- A medical scanner with an electrocardiograph (EKG), that can monitor and display individuals' vital signs, and indicate conditions such as injury, poison, stress, or other emotional behavior (first used in Episode 1, "Knight of the Phoenix (Pt. 2)")
- A Voice Stress Analyzer which can process spoken voices and determine if deception is present (first used in Episode 26, "Merchants of Death")
- A bomb sniffer module that can detect explosives within a few yards of the vehicle via an atmospheric sampling device mounted in his front bumper (first used in Episode 25, "Brother's Keeper")

KITT has a microwave jamming system that allows him to take control of electronic machines, such as cheating at slot machines, breaking electronic locks, disrupting security cameras, and withdrawing money from ATMs. KITT can also use microwaves to heat a vehicle's brake fluid, causing it to expand and thus apply the brakes of the car. In Episode 26, "Merchants of Death", the microwave system's power was increased to triple its normal strength, strong enough to bring down a helicopter at a limited distance.

Engine and driving

KITT is powered by the Knight Industries turbojet engine, with modified afterburners and a computer-controlled 8-speed turbo-drive transmission. This helps him accelerate from 0–60 mph in 2 seconds (1.37 g). Real engine was 5.0L V8 with 145 hp. Some stunt cars used 3.8L V6 turbo.

KITT primarily uses hydrogen fuel, but his complex fuel processor allows him to run on any combustible liquid, including regular gasoline. In one episode, KITT mentioned his fuel economy was at least 65 miles per gallon.

KITT can employ a "turbo boost", a pair of rocket boosters mounted behind the front tires. These lift the car, allowing KITT to jump into the air and pass over obstacles in the road. Turbo boost can also accelerate KITT to extreme speeds, in excess of 200 mph (322 km/h). The boosters can fire forward or backward, although the backward booster was rarely used.

In later seasons, a passive laser restraint system helped protect Michael and any passengers from the shock of sudden impacts and hard stopping. It is speculated that this is a primitive form of an inertial damping device (first used in Episode 47, "Knight of the Drones").

KITT has four main driving modes:

- Normal cruise: Michael has control of the car. In an emergency, KITT can activate Auto Cruise mode - this was first seen in the pilot episode when Michael falls asleep at the wheel and KITT assumes control. KITT can also override Michael's actions if he is wilfully endangering his life (first seen in the Series 1 episode Trust Doesn't Rust, when Michael plays a game of chicken with KARR)
- Auto cruise: KITT's CPU controls the car using an advanced Auto Collision Avoidance system.
- Pursuit mode: A combination of manual and computer-assisted operation used during high-speed driving. KITT can respond to road conditions faster than Michael's reflexes; however, Michael is technically in control of the vehicle and KITT helps to guide certain maneuvers.
- Silent mode: This feature dampens his engine noise and allows him to sneak around (first used in Episode 37, "White-Line Warriors")

Other vehicle modes include: a two-wheel ski drive that allows KITT to drive up on two wheels (first used in Episode 1, "Knight of the Phoenix"); an aquatic synthesizer that allows KITT to hydroplane, using his wheels and turbo system for propulsion (first used in Episode 28, "Return to Cadiz", and removed by the end of the episode because it was faulty); and a High Traction Drop Downs (HTDD) system that hydraulically raises KITT's chassis for better traction when driving off-road (first used in Episode 39, "Speed Demons").

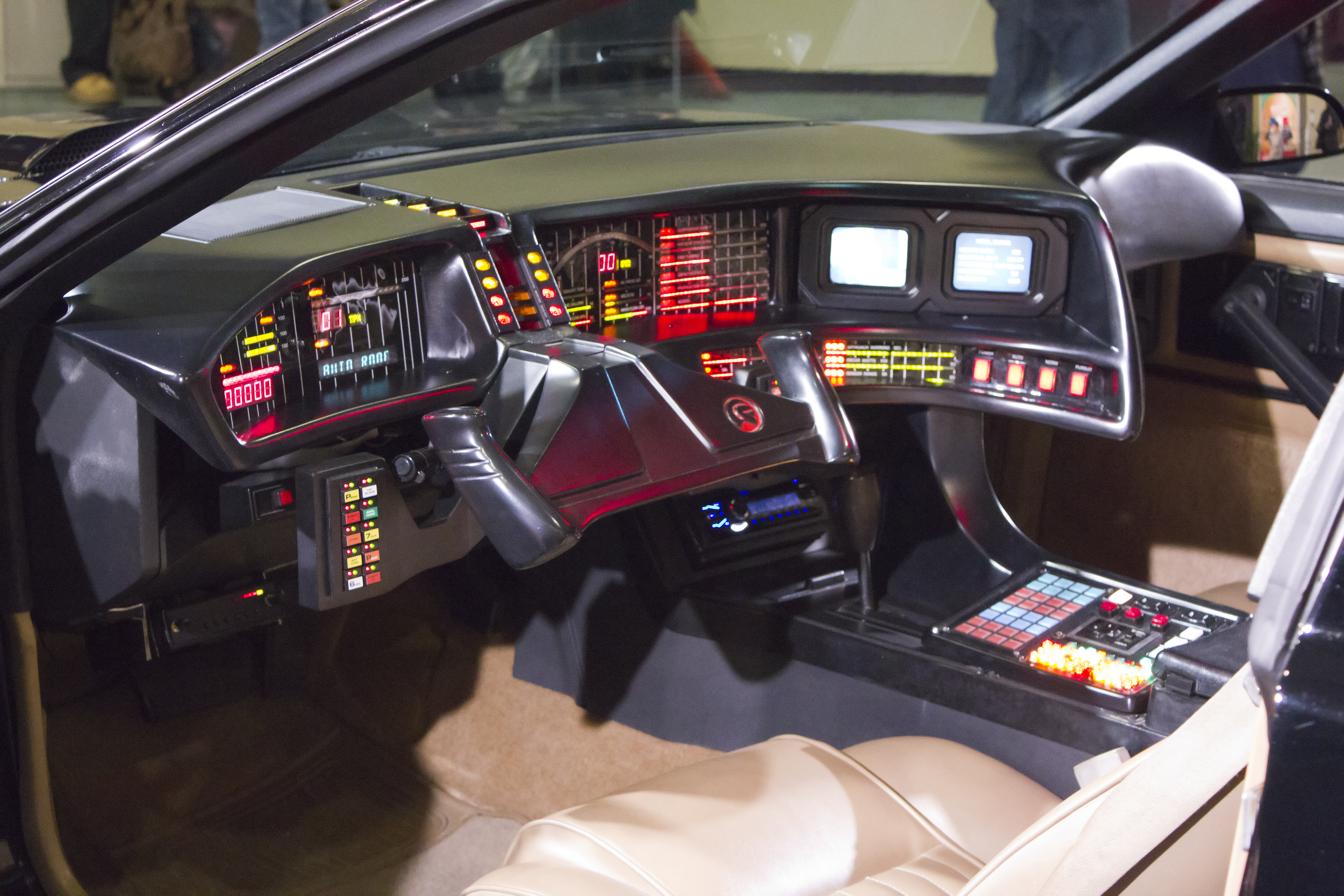
KITT instrumentation (1st/2nd seasons)

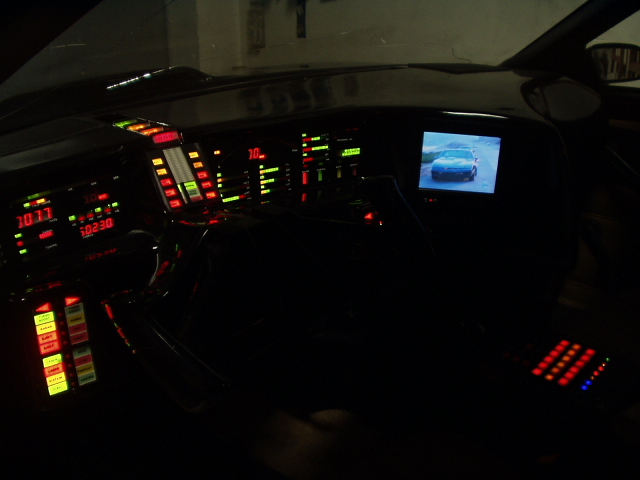
KITT instrumentation (3rd/4th seasons)

Dashboard equipment

KITT has two CRT-video display monitors on his dashboard. Michael can contact home base and communicate with Devon and others by way of a telephone comlink on KITT's video display. The video display is also used for the Graphic Translator system and for scanning or analysis results. KITT can also print hard copies of data on a dashboard-mounted printer (first used in Episode 15, "The Topaz Connection").

KITT has an Ultraphonic Chemical Analyzer scanning tray which can analyze the chemical properties of various materials. It can scan fingerprints and read ballistic information off bullets, and compare these results with a police database. The system can also analyze chemical information gathered from KITT's exterior sensors (first used in Episode 17, "Chariot of Gold").

KITT also has an in-dash entertainment system that can play music, video, and arcade games. KITT can dispense money to Michael when he needed it (First used in Episode 59, "Knight by a Nose").

Driver compartment

KITT has two front ejection seats (first used in Episode 1, "Knight of the Phoenix"), firstly to remove two car thieves who attempt to steal him, then to deposit Michael on a nearby rooftop. In line with his primary directive, KITT will eject Michael (and his passenger) in a last resort as a lifesaving measure if a fatal collision is imminent.

KITT can release oxygen into his driver compartment and provide air to passengers; this is useful if he is ever submerged under water or buried (first used in Episode 5, "Slammin' Sammy's Stunt Show Spectacular"). Alternatively, in the event of unwanted occupants, KITT can spray a gas into the driver compartment to render them unconscious, or expel all breathable air from the driver compartment (KITT never harmed anyone with his feature, but used it one time to rid the compartment of smoke after bombs were detonated in his trunk).

==== External features ====
KITT is equipped with a highly protective plating made of "Tri-Helical Plasteel 1000 MBS" (Molecular Bonded Shell), a combination of three secret substances together referred to as the Knight Compound developed by Wilton Knight. The shell protects him from almost all forms of conventional firearms and explosive devices. He can only be harmed by heavy artillery and rockets. This makes KITT's body durable enough to act as a shield for explosives, to ram through barriers without suffering damage, and to sustain frequent on turbo boost jumps without risking damage to the vehicle's structural integrity. The MBS plating protects KITT from fire but is vulnerable to electricity, as seen in the episode "Lost Knight" (season 3, episode 10); some potent acids, as seen in episode 70 "Knight Of The Juggernaut"; and lasers. The shell provides a frame tolerance of 223,000 lb (111.5 tons) and a front and rear axle suspension load of 57,000 lb (28.5 tons). KITT is also protected by a thermal-resistant Pyroclastic lamination coating that can withstand sustained temperatures of up to 800 °F (426 °C) (first used in Episode 32, "Ring of Fire").

Other external features include:

- KITT can tint his windshield and windows to become opaque (first seen in Episode 14, "Give Me Liberty... or Give Me Death").
- KITT can automatically open and close his doors, windows, hood, and trunk. He can lock these entry points to prevent unauthorized entry into his driver compartment. His door handles contain fingerprint scanners that only allow Michael (or any authorised member of Knight Industries/FLAG) access.
- He can deflate and re-inflate his tires (first used in Episode 5, "Slammin' Sammy's Stunt Show Spectacular") and produce tire traction spikes to overcome steep terrain (first seen in Episode 86, "Hills of Fire").
- KITT can rotate his "KNIGHT" license plate to reveal a fictitious one reading "KNI 667" (first used in Episode 25, "Brother's Keeper")
- KITT's headlights can flash red and blue like police lights, and he has a siren (first used in Episode 38, "Race for Life").
- KITT is equipped with a parachute (first used in Episode 23, "Goliath Returns part 1")
- KITT can launch magnesium flares, which can also be used to divert heat-seeking missiles fired at him (first used in Episode 26, "Merchants of Death").
- KITT has a hidden winch and grappling hook system. The grappling hook is first used in Episode 6, "Not a Drop to Drink"; the winch is first used in Episode 13, "Forget Me Not".
- There are flame throwers mounted under the bumpers (first used in Episode 2, "Deadly Maneuvers").
- There is an induction coil under the front bumper that can induce electrical voltage or current in a metal object (first used in "Knight of the Drones Part I" to electrify a fence in order to incapacitate two thugs without seriously harming them).
- KITT can put out small fires from a CO_{2} sprayer in his bumpers.
- From under the rear bumper, KITT can spray a jet of oil, creating an oil slick; or emit a plume of smoke, creating a smoke screen (both were first used in Episode 1, "Knight of the Phoenix"). KITT can also dispense a cloud of tear gas along with his smoke screen (first used in Episode 13, "Hearts of Stone").
- KITT has a high-powered ultra-frequency modulated resonating laser, capable of burning through steel plating (first used in Episode 9, "Trust Doesn't Rust"). Until the laser was calibrated, KITT could not fire it himself; it could only be fired by KITT's technician Bonnie. If the laser was fired more than twice, it would drain KITT's batteries.

==== Fourth season redesign ====
During the first episode of the fourth season, "Knight of the Juggernaut, Part I", KITT's Molecular Bonded Shell is neutralized by an enemy vehicle, the Juggernaut, and KITT is nearly destroyed. KITT is redesigned and rebuilt in the following episode, "Knight of the Juggernaut, Part II". KITT's initial roof was a T-top, but the redesigned KITT has a convertible roof. The other major feature of the redesign is that a Super-Pursuit mode was added, consisting of improved rocket boosters for enhanced acceleration (40% increase over previous top speed), retractable spoilers for aerodynamic stability, movable air inlets for increased cooling, and an emergency braking system. When Super-Pursuit mode is used at night some of the exterior and under the wheel arches glow red.

=== F.L.A.G. Mobile Command Center ===
FLAG Mobile Command Center with Aerodynamic Sleeping Cab

KITT has access to a mobile "garage" called the FLAG Mobile Command Center, a semi-trailer truck owned by the Foundation. In most episodes, it is a GMC General. The trailer has an extendable ramp that drops down and allows KITT to drive inside even while the truck is in motion. The trailer is loaded with spare parts and equipment for KITT and a computer lab, so that technicians Bonnie or April can conduct repairs and maintenance while in transit.

=== Screen-used cars ===
A total of 23 KITT cars were made for use in filming the series, although speculation is that there were as many as 25. Most of these cars were destroyed at the end of filming. Only five cars survived that fate. Universal kept one hero car and one stunt car at the Entertainment Center; these two have since been sold to a private collector in the United States. One stunt car (originally at the Universal Studios theme park) was sold to a theme park in Brisbane, Queensland, Australia for World Expo '88. One convertible was sold to the former Cars of the Stars Motor Museum in Keswick, Cumbria, England, and later sold to the Dezer Collection in Orlando, Florida when Cars of the Stars closed. The fifth car is believed to be in a private collection in the United Kingdom. The right-hand drive KITT, known as the "Official Right Hand Drive KITT" as used in the video "Jump In My Car" by David Hasselhoff, is owned by a company called Wilderness Studios Australia.

Press releases regularly appear claiming 'original screen-used' cars are being sold. For example: on April 4, 2007, "one of the four KITT cars used in production of the television series" was alleged being put up for sale for $149,995 by Johnny Verhoek of Kassabian Motors, Dublin, California. A story in USA Today from December 2007 states that slain real estate developer and car aficionado, Andrew Kissel, was in possession of one of the surviving cars. Some reports say that Michael Jackson bought an original KITT and former NSYNC band member Joey Fatone also claims to have purchased one of these authentic original KITTs at auction. The authenticity of these claims is dubitable, as there have been more "original" cars auctioned than were built for the show.

The fifth episode of the Dutch TV programme Syndroom, featuring people with Down syndrome who wish to fulfil a dream, features Twan Vermeulen, a Knight Rider fan who meets David Hasselhoff and KITT in Los Angeles.

== Knight Industries Three Thousand (KITT) ==
Knight Industries Three Thousand
- Knight Rider character
- KITT in its Pilot Attack Mode
- First appearance: "Knight Rider" (2008 pilot)
- Created by: Glen A. Larson
- Portrayed by: Ford Shelby GT500KR
- Voiced by: Val Kilmer

The 2008 reboot of Knight Rider includes a new KITT, now standing for Knight Industries Three Thousand. The KITT platform is patterned on a Shelby GT500KR and differs from the original Two Thousand unit in several ways. For example, the 2008 KITT features nanotechnology activated by the AI, which allows the car's outer shell to change colors and temporarily morph into other vehicle models. It can turn into two different types of a Ford F-150 4x4 truck (one completely stock and the other with some modifications), a Ford E-150 van, a Ford Crown Victoria Police Interceptor, a special edition Warriors In Pink Mustang (in support of breast cancer awareness month), a Ford Flex, and a 1969 Ford Mustang Mach 1. In the Halloween episode "Knight of the Living Dead", KITT demonstrates the ability to cosmetically alter his appearance, becoming a black Mustang convertible with a pink trim as a Halloween costume. This configuration had the scanner bar relocated to behind the grille.

The car can engage an "Attack Mode", which allows it to increase speed and use most of its gadgets (including turbo boost). KITT is capable of functioning submerged, maintaining life support and system integrity while underwater. KITT's weapons include a grappling hook located in the front bumper, usable in normal and Attack modes, two Gatling-style guns that are retracted from the hood, a laser, and missile launchers usable only in Attack mode (first used in "Knight of the Hunter").

KITT has numerous other features:

- An olfactory sensor that allows KITT to "smell" via an atmospheric sampling device mounted in his front bumper
- Turbo boost
- A voice stress analyzer that is used to process spoken voices and determine if someone may be lying
- A computer printout that can print hard copies of data on a dashboard-mounted printer, a backup mainframe processor
- A windshield projection used in place of the center console screen in the pilot for displaying extra information as well as the video communication link with the SSC
- A bio matrix scanner used to detect the health status of persons in the immediate area
- A hood surface screen
- An electromagnetic pulse projector that can disable any electronic circuit or device within the given area
- The ability to fire discs that produce intense heat in order to deter heat-seeking projectiles
- The ability to fill the cabin with tear gas to incapacitate unauthorized occupants
- A 3D object printer that allows for the creation of small 3D objects (such as keys) based on available electronic data
- A standard printer used for documents and incoming faxes that is located in the passenger side dash
- A small arms cache accessible via the glove box area that usually contains two 9MM handguns with extra magazines for occupant's protection outside KITT
- A tactical first aid kit inside the glove box
- A software program secretly built into KITT that, when activated, turns KITT into a bomb using his fuel as the charge and his computer as the detonator
- In "Knight of the Zodiac", KITT uses a dispenser in his undercarriage to spread black ice, and a fingerprint generator in the glovebox to overlay the fingerprints of a captured thief over Mike's.

== Knight Industries Four Thousand ==
Knight 4000
- The Knight 4000 in the FLAG laboratory
- First appearance: Knight Rider 2000
- Created by: Glen A. Larson
- Portrayed by: Modified Dodge Stealth
- Voiced by: Carmen Argenziano (Knight 4000's original A.I.) (uncredited) later William Daniels (KITT A.I.) (uncredited)
- Nickname: The 4000, later KIFT

In the 1991 made-for-TV movie sequel to the 1982 TV series, Knight Rider 2000, the original KITT's microprocessor unit was transferred into the body of another vehicle intended to be his successor, the Knight 4000 (KIFT). The vehicle had several 21st-century technological improvements over the 1980s Pontiac Trans-Am version of KITT, such as:

- amphibious mode (which allows the car to travel across water like a speedboat),
- a virtual reality heads-up display,
- a microwave stun device that can remotely incapacitate a human target,
- a remote target assist that helps the pilot aim and fire with perfect accuracy,
- voice activated controls,
- a fax machine,
- an infrared scanner that can identify hidden objects giving off heat, like laser scope rifles,
- a more complex olfactory scan,
- a voice sampler that could simulate any voice recorded into the Knight 4000's memory,
- a microwave projector that can quickly heat targeted objects to ignite or explode,
- a thermal sensor that allows the Knight 4000 to watch and record what is happening

The studio was unable to use the real Pontiac Banshee IV concept car for the movie, so instead it hired Jay Ohrberg Star Cars Inc. to customize a 1991 Dodge Stealth for the Knight 4000. After filming wrapped, the custom car was used on other TV productions of the time and can also be seen, albeit briefly, as a stolen supercar in CHiPs '99, as repainted future police vehicles in Power Rangers Time Force, in an episode of the television series Black Scorpion in March 2001, and in a hidden camera TV series called Scare Tactics. After being abandoned and unmaintained for 10 years, one of the screen-used cars was offered for sale in January 2021 by Bob's Prop Shop in Las Vegas.

== KARR ==
KARR
- Knight Rider character
- KARR from the original series episode "K.I.T.T. vs. K.A.R.R."
- First appearance: Trust Doesn't Rust (November 19, 1982)
- Created by: Wilton Knight/Knight Industries
- Portrayed by: Pontiac Firebird (third generation)
- Voiced by: Peter Cullen (1982 and 2008–2009 series); Paul Frees (1984) (uncredited)

KARR (Knight Automated Roving Robot) is the name of a fictional, automated, prototype vehicle featured as a major antagonist of KITT (Knight Industries Two Thousand), in two episodes of the 1982 original series, and was part of a multi-episode story arc in the 2008 revived series.

KARR (voiced by Peter Cullen) first appeared in "Trust Doesn't Rust" aired on NBC on November 19, 1982, where he seemingly met his demise at the end. However, he was so popular with viewers that he was brought back again in "K.I.T.T. vs. K.A.R.R.", for a second time (voiced by voice actor Paul Frees) which aired on NBC on November 4, 1984.

Trust Doesn't Rust was also printed in book form, written by Roger Hill and Glen A. Larson, following the story and general script of the original television episode, expanding some areas of the plot and adding several extra secondary characters.

KARR was brought back in 2009 for "Knight to King's Pawn" of the new "Knight Rider" series of 2008–2009 for a third time (marking it as one of the very few villains from the original series to make a return appearance in the new series).

=== KARR design and development ===
KARR was originally designed by Wilton Knight and built by Knight Industries for military purposes for the Department of Defense. After the completion of the vehicle, the KARR processor was installed and activated. However, a programming error caused the computer to be unstable and potentially dangerous. KARR was programmed for self-preservation, but this proved to be dangerous to the Foundation's humanitarian interests. The project was suspended and KARR was stored until a solution could be found. Once KITT was constructed, it was presumed that his prototype KARR had been deactivated and dismantled. However, the latter did not occur and KARR was placed in storage and forgotten following the death of Wilton Knight. KARR was later unwittingly reactivated by thieves in the original episode Trust Doesn't Rust, and was thought destroyed, but then reappeared in the episode K.I.T.T. vs. K.A.R.R and was seen to be finally destroyed by Michael and KITT.

Originally KARR was identical to KITT – all black with a red scan bar. Upon KARR's return in "K.I.T.T. vs. K.A.R.R.", his scan bar is now amber/yellow but is otherwise still the same as KITT. KARR later gets a brand new two-tone paint job incorporating a silver lower body into the familiar black finish. KARR's scanner originally made a low droning noise, and the sound of KARR's engine originally sounded rough, but in the return episode the scanner and the engine both sounds similar to KITT's albeit with a slight reverb effect added. In "Trust Doesn't Rust" KARR had no license plates, but a California license plate that read "KARR" from his second appearance onwards. KARR's voice modulator showed as greenish-yellow on his dash display, a different color and design than the various incarnations of KITT's red display.

=== Personality ===
Unlike KITT, whose primary directive is to protect human life, KARR was programmed for self-preservation, making him a ruthless and unpredictable threat. He does not appear as streetwise as KITT, being very naïve and inexperienced and having a childlike perception of the world. This has occasionally allowed people to take advantage of his remarkable capabilities for their own gain; however, due to his ruthless nature, he sometimes uses people's weaknesses and greed as a way to manipulate them for his own goals. Despite this, he does ultimately consider itself superior (always referring to KITT as "the inferior production line model") as well as unstoppable, and due to his programming, the villains do not usually get very far. KARR demonstrates a complete lack of respect or loyalty – on one occasion ejecting his passenger to reduce weight and increase his chances of escape.

KARR's evil personality is also somewhat different in the comeback episode. His childlike perceptions are diminished into a more devious personality, completely cold and bent on revenge. His self-preservation directive is no longer in play. When KARR is close to exploding after receiving severe damage; he willingly turbo-jumps into a mid-air collision with KITT, hoping that his own destruction would also spell his counterpart's. Even KARR's modus operandi is different; servicing enough in the first episode, he aims to actually make use of other people to serve his own needs. One explanation of this change could be as a result of the damage he received after falling over the cliff at the end of "Trust Doesn't Rust", causing further malfunctions in his programming. Indeed, KITT himself is seen to malfunction and suffer change of personality as a result of damage in several other episodes.

=== KARR 2.0 ===
Knight Auto-cybernetic Roving Robotic-exoskeleton (KARR 2.0)
- Knight Rider character
- KARR 2.0 as it appeared on the schematic display in "Knight of the Living Dead"
- First appearance: Knight of the Living Dead
- Created by: Glen A. Larson
- Portrayed by: Ford Mustang Shelby GT500 KR
- Voiced by: Peter Cullen

To mirror the original series, the nemesis and prototype of the second KITT (Knight Industries Three Thousand) is also designated KARR in the new series. KARR 2.0 (Peter Cullen) is mentioned in the new Knight Rider series episode "Knight of the Living Dead", and is said to be a prototype of KITT (Knight Industries Three Thousand). The new KARR acronym was changed to "Knight Auto-cybernetic Roving Robotic-exoskeleton".

KARR's visual identity has also had similar changes for the new series. Instead of an automobile, a schematic display shows a heavily armed humanoid-looking robot with wheeled legs that converts into an ambiguous off-road vehicle. KARR has the ability to transform from vehicle mode into a large wheeled robotic exoskeleton, instead of KITT's "Attack Mode". The vehicle mode of KARR is a 2008–2009 Shelby GT500KR with the license plate initials K.R. KARR is once again voiced by Peter Cullen, who also voiced the first appearance of KARR in "Trust Doesn't Rust".

KARR was originally designed for military combat. Armed with twin machine guns on each shoulder and missiles, the exoskeleton combines with a human being for easier control. KARR is visually identical to KITT in this iteration, lacking the two-tone black and silver paint job of the 1980s version of KARR. The only difference is the scanner and voice box, which are yellow compared to KITT's red. Once again, similar to the original character, this entirely different "KARR" project (2.0) had an A.I. that was programmed for self-preservation, and he was deactivated and placed in storage after he reprogrammed itself and killed seven people.

When KARR finally appears again in the episode "Knight to King's Pawn", he takes a form once again similar to KITT as a 2008 Ford Shelby Mustang GT500KR, and is once again 100% black like KITT 3000, the only difference is that he has a yellow scan light bar and 100% yellow color voice module. In the original series, it was more amber/yellow, and KARR's voice module originally yellow-green in the original series. KARR's scanner sounds much lower with much more of an echo. The sound is especially noticeable when KARR is chasing down KITT while he is still in Ford Mustang mode.

== Reception and popular culture ==
KITT was a popular character at the time of the show's release. Nickyanne Moody has argued that one of the reasons for KITT's popularity was that the character "domesticated then-powerful technology" (computers), making it "accessible, flexible and portable" in a way that was also "reliable and secure". Knight Rider became one of "the first popular texts to visualize and narrativize the potential of [computer] technologies to transform daily life". Moody also argued that the relationship between Knight and KITT was more complex and nuanced than many "buddy-ship" relationships of other "Cold War warriors". KITT has also been discussed in the context of the human–robot (or human–AI) interaction.

KITT influenced the design of real-world computers interfaces in motor vehicles; a number of studies found that the science-fiction vision of the 1980s, portrayed in the show, was reflected in real life designs in the early 2000s. Shaked and Winter noted that it was "one of the most appealing multimodal mobile interfaces of the 1980s", although talking to computers in a way similar to humans is still in its early stages of maturing as a technology as of 2019.

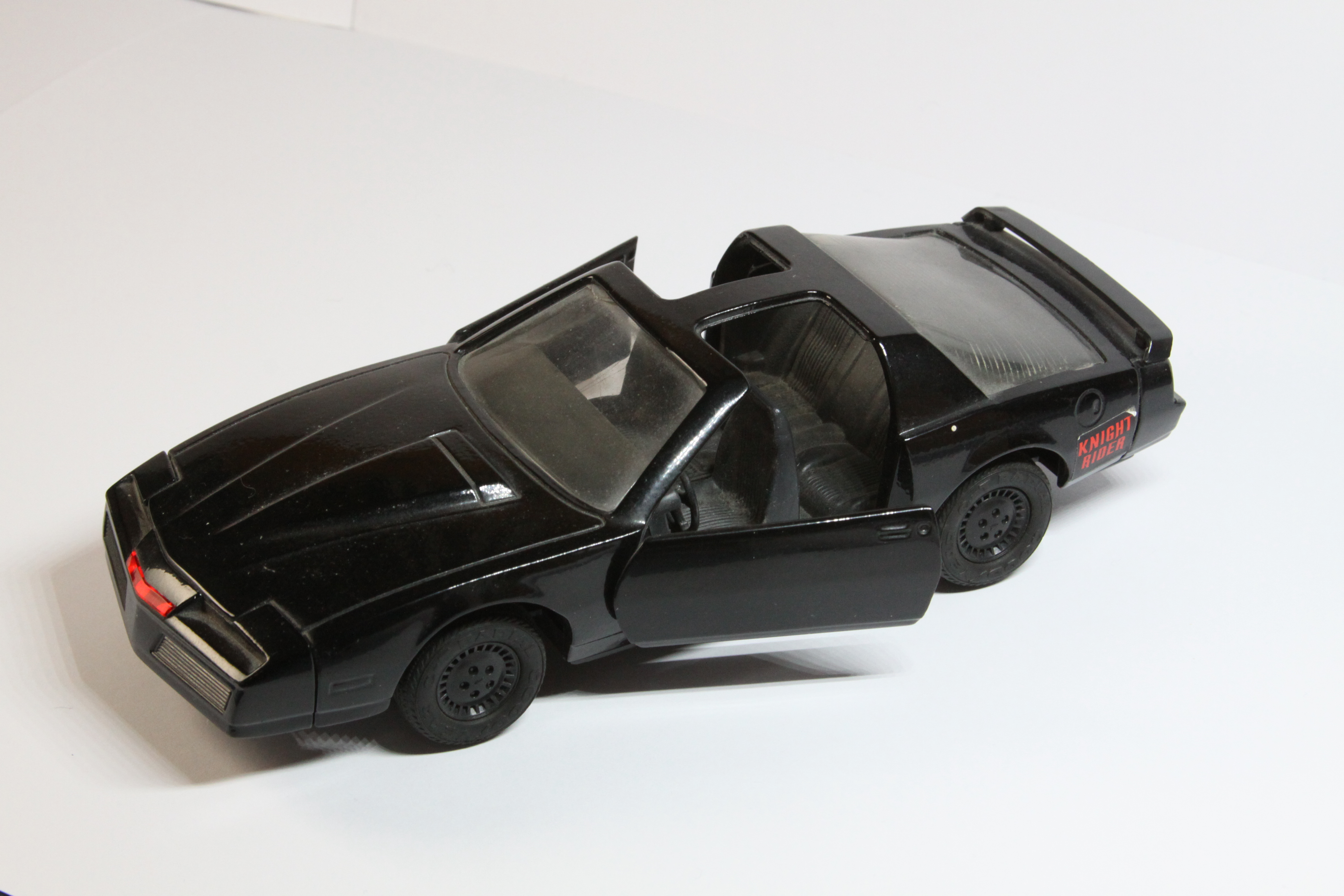
1:25 Ertl Company KITT toy model

Popular Knight Rider memorabilia includes a remote-controlled KITT, the Knight Rider lunch box, and the "Knight 2000 Voice Car" sold by Kenner Toys, which spoke electronically (voiced by William Daniels) and featured a detailed interior and Michael Knight action figure. ERTL released die-cast toys of KITT in three different sizes—the common miniature sized model, a 'medium' sized model, and a large sized model. These toys featured red reflective holograms on the nose to represent the scanner. In late 2004, a 1/18 scale die-cast model of KITT were produced by ERTL, complete with detailed interior and light-up moving scanner. In September 2006, Hitari, a UK-based company that produces remote control toy cars, released the Knight Rider KITT remote control car in 1/15 scale complete with the working red scanner lights, KITT's voice from the TV show, and the car's turbine engine sound effect. In December 2012, Diamond Select Toys released a talking electronic 1/15 scale KITT that features a light up dashboard, scanner, fog lights, tail lights, and the voice of William Daniels.

KITT is in Knight Rider: The Game and its sequel, and appears in the Knight Rider World in Lego Dimensions.

Featuring the iconic voice of William Daniels, the Knight Rider GPS was a fully working GPS using Mio navigational technology. The GPS featured custom recorded voices so that the unit could "speak to" its owner using their own name if it was one of the ones in the recorded set of names.
