= Robert Montague =

Robert Montague may refer to:

- Robert Latane Montague (1829–1880), American politician
- Robert Miller Montague (1899–1958), American lieutenant general
- Robert M. Montague Jr. (1924–1996), his son, American brigadier general
- Robert Montague (Jamaican politician) (born 1965), member of the Senate of Jamaica

== See also ==
- Robert Montagu (disambiguation)
