= 2025 Daytona Speedweeks =

Car-racing event at Daytona, Florida, USA

The 2025 Speedweeks Presented by AdventHealth at Daytona International Speedway marked the commencement of the NASCAR season, featuring a series of events that led up to the 2025 Daytona 500.

== Background ==
Daytona International Speedway, the track where Speedweeks took place

Speedweeks, officially known as "Speedweeks Presented by AdventHealth," is an annual series of racing events held at Daytona International Speedway in Daytona Beach, Florida. This event traditionally kicks off the NASCAR season, culminating with the Daytona 500.

== Events ==
=== Wednesday, February 12 ===
==== Daytona 500 Practice 1 ====
The first practice session for the 2025 Daytona 500 took place at 10:00 A.M EST. Denny Hamlin led the session, clocking a fastest lap of 48.005 seconds at a speed of 187.480 mph (301.720 km/h).

Chandler Smith, driving for Garage 66, was the fastest among the "open" competitors, posting a lap of 48.341 seconds and a speed of 186.177 mph (299.623 km/h). This performance is notable as 45 cars are attempting to qualify for this year's Daytona 500, and Smith was the quickest among the nine teams not locked into the race.

The session primarily consisted of single-car runs as teams focused on shakedowns in preparation for the upcoming qualifying events. There was limited drafting practice near the end of the session.

==== Daytona 500 Qualifying ====
Chase Briscoe secured the pole position for the Daytona 500 during Wednesday's single-car qualifying session, clocking a lap time of 49.249 seconds at a speed of 182.745 mph (294.100 km/h). This achievement marks Briscoe's first pole with JGR and also Toyota's first pole in the history of the Daytona 500.

Joining Briscoe on the front row is Austin Cindric of Team Penske, who posted a lap time of 49.325 seconds and had a speed of 182.463 mph (293.646 km/h).

Notably, former Cup Series champions Jimmie Johnson and Martin Truex Jr. secured their spots in the Daytona 500 based on their qualifying speeds.

=== Thursday, February 13 ===
==== Ride the 'Dente 200 Qualifying ====
Qualifying was originally scheduled to be held on Friday, but was cancelled due to inclement weather. William Sawalich, driving for JGR, would start on the pole. Qualifying was replaced by a 40-minute practice session.

==== Fresh From Florida 250 Practice ====
Practice was originally scheduled to be held at 5:05 P.M. EST, but was cancelled due to inclement weather.

==== The Duel at Daytona ====
In the Duels, Briscoe started on the pole for Duel 1 while Cindric started on the pole for Duel 2. Bubba Wallace won the first duel with help from his teammate Tyler Reddick. Erik Jones crossed the finish line in the second duel first, but due to a very late caution being called just before he passed Cindric, Cindric was determined to be the leader at the time of caution.

=== Friday, February 14 ===
==== Ride the 'Dente 200 Practice ====
Practice was originally scheduled to be held on Thursday but due to inclement weather, practice was canceled. A 40-minute practice session will be held at 1:30 P.M. EST.

==== Fresh From Florida 250 Qualifying ====
Ben Rhodes would secure the pole position for the race during Friday's single-car qualifying session, clocking a lap time of 51.995 seconds at a speed of 176.488 mph (284.030 km/h).

==== United Rentals 300 Practice ====
Practice took place at 4:35 P.M EST. Taylor Gray topped the session, clocking a fastest lap of 48.386 seconds at a speed of 186.004 mph (299.344 km/h).

==== Daytona 500 Practice 2 ====
The second practice session for the Daytona 500 took place at 5:35 P.M EST. William Byron topped the session, clocking a fastest lap of 46.172 seconds at a speed of 194.923 mph (313.698 km/h).

==== Fresh From Florida 250 ====
In the early laps, Kaden Honeycutt was spun into the wall and sent him out. Ben Rhodes, the pole sitter, won the first stage, while Matt Crafton won the second stage, his first since 2023. Toni Breidinger had multiple incidents throughout the night. On the final lap, after passing Rhodes and riding out a wreck that occurred behind him, Parker Kligerman, driving for Henderson Motorsports, won the race while under yellow flag conditions, but later failed post race inspection for the truck being too low. Corey Heim, who originally finished 2nd, was credited with the win while Kligerman was disqualified.

=== Saturday, February 15 ===
==== United Rentals 300 Qualifying ====
Qualifying was originally scheduled to be held on Saturday, February 15, at 10:00 AM EST, but was cancelled due to inclement weather. The starting lineup was based on the pandemic formula. As a result, the defending champion, Justin Allgaier, driving for JR Motorsports, would start on the pole.

==== Ride the 'Dente 200 ====
The race started early when the big one occurred on lap 4 when a total of 15 cars got pulled up. By mid-race, there were six caution flags and 25 of the 40 drivers were involved in at least one incident. In the end, Brenden Queen would hold off William Sawalich and would earn his first career ARCA win.

==== Daytona 500 Practice 3 ====
The third and final practice session for the Daytona 500 took place at 3:05 P.M EST. Brad Keselowski topped the session, clocking a fastest lap of 46.558 seconds at a speed of 193.307 mph (311.097 km/h).

==== United Rentals 300 ====
Austin Hill swept the stages for the second time in his career. After Connor Zilisch and other drives spun out with 2 laps to go, the race went to overtime. In the end, Jesse Love would hold off Sam Mayer to win his 2nd career race.

=== Sunday, February 16 ===
==== Daytona 500 ====
The race had a slow start when the caution flag was thrown 9 laps in. After nearly 3 hours and 30 minutes under the red flag, involving 2 red flags, the race promptly resumed. Joey Logano won the first stage and Ryan Blaney would edge out Austin Cindric and win the second stage. With 5 laps to go, as the field entered the backstretch, Cole Custer turned Christopher Bell into the wall, resulting in Ryan Preece flipping mid-air, resulting in overtime. In the end, William Byron was awarded his second consecutive Daytona 500 victory. This was the 10th Daytona 500 win for Hendrick Motorsports, the most all-time.
