= History of the Daytona 500 =

NASCAR race history

This article documents historical records, statistics, and race recaps of the Daytona 500, held annually at Daytona International Speedway in Daytona Beach, Florida.

== Pre-race history ==
The table below summarizes the pace cars, grand marshals, honorary starters, and performers of the national anthem at the Daytona 500. Since 2006, the pace car has been driven by a celebrity guest at the start of the race (mirroring the tradition used the Indy 500). During the race, however, a NASCAR official drives the pace car during caution periods. Since 2004, Brett Bodine has served as the official pace car driver. Previously, Robert "Buster" Auton and Elmo Langley were pace car drivers. Since 2010, the United States Air Force Thunderbirds perform two flyovers after the national anthem and after the starting command. Since 2024, the national anthem has been performed by a military ensemble or personnel.

Year	Pace Car (Celebrity driver)	Grand marshal	Honorary starter	National anthem
1959	Pontiac Bonneville convertible			
1960	Buick convertible			
1961	Pontiac Bonneville convertible			
1962	Pontiac Bonneville convertible			
1963	Buick convertible			
1964	Dodge Coronet convertible			
1965	Dodge Coronet convertible			
1966	Plymouth Belvedere convertible			
1967	Pontiac Firebird	Mike Womer		
1968	Chevrolet Camaro convertible	Alan S. Boyd		
1969	Chevrolet Camaro convertible	Fred Hartley (Union)		
1970	Ford Torino GT convertible	Semon Knudsen		
1971	Porsche Audi 914			
1972	Pontiac LeMans	James Garner		
1973	Pontiac LeMans	George C. Wallace	Joe Littlejohn	
1974	Pontiac Grand Am	Major Jacques Maury	Robert Miller Montague	
1975	Pontiac LeMans	Alejandro Orfila	Charlie Rich	
1976	Pontiac Grand Prix	George C. Wallace		
1977	Pontiac Grand Prix	Joseph J. Sisco	Ken Stabler	
1978	Pontiac Grand Prix	George H. W. Bush	James A. Michener	
1979	Pontiac Trans-Am	Robert Stempel	Ben Gazzara	
1980	Pontiac Firebird Turbo Trans-Am	August A. Busch III	Hugh A. Carter Jr.	
1981	Pontiac Firebird Turbo Trans-Am	Charles J. Pillod Jr. (Goodyear)	William E. Hoglund (Pontiac)	US Air Force Band
1982	Pontiac Firebird Trans-Am	Edward A. Horrigan Jr. (R.J. Reynolds)	Joseph Block (Pepsi)	
1983	Pontiac Firebird Trans-Am	Donald M. Kendall	George H. W. Bush	Jim Hayes
1984	Pontiac Firebird Trans-Am	William S. McConnor (Union)	William R. Howard (Piedmont)	
1985	Pontiac Firebird Trans-Am	F. James McDonald	Jere W. Thompson (Southland Ice Corp.)	The Upland People Organization
1986	Pontiac Firebird Trans-Am	Michael J. Roarty (Anheuser-Busch)	Richard Stegemeier (Union)	Scott Weidenmiller
1987	Pontiac Firebird Trans-Am	F. Ross Johnson	Jon Mills	T. G. Sheppard
1988	Pontiac Grand Prix	Dolph Von Arx (R.J. Reynolds)	Roger Beech (Unocal)	Harry Burney
1989	Pontiac Turbo Grand Prix	Richard Stegemeier (Union)	Neal Pilson (CBS)	
1990	Pontiac Turbo Grand Prix	George J. Mitchell	Anthony J. Celebrezze	The Osmonds
1991	Pontiac Grand Prix GTP	Jim Sasser	Alfred E. Dudley (First Brands)	T.G. Sheppard and Slow Burn
1992	Pontiac Grand Prix GTP	Richard Petty	Ray Pinion (First Brands)	
1993	Pontiac Trans-Am	John D. Dingell	Richard Petty	
1994	Pontiac Trans-Am	Peter S. P. Dimsey (MasterCard)	Troy Aikman	Michelle Wright
1995	Pontiac Trans-Am	Ed Woolard (DuPont)	Jim Kelly	Diamond Rio
1996	Pontiac Trans-Am	Join R. Leach (Sears)	Lawrence M. Higby (Unocal)	Engelbert Humperdinck
1997	Pontiac Grand Prix	Bob Rewey (Ford)	Jim Keown (Pepsi)	Lorrie Morgan
1998	Pontiac Grand Prix	Bill Graves	Dan Marino	Kathy Mattea
1999	Pontiac Trans-Am	Clarence Thomas	Brett Favre	Edwin McCain
2000	Pontiac Grand Prix	Sam Gibara (Goodyear)	Jackie Joyner-Kersee	Jesse McGuire
2001	Pontiac Aztek (Frankie Muniz)	James P. Kelly (UPS)	Terry Bradshaw	O-Town
2002	Pontiac Trans-Am	Charles O. Holliday (DuPont)	Angie Harmon	Denyce Graves
2003	Pontiac Grand Prix	John Travolta	Mariah Carey	
2004	Chevrolet Corvette C5	President George W. Bush	Whoopi Goldberg	LeAnn Rimes
2005	Chevrolet Corvette	Matthew McConaughey	Ashton Kutcher	Vanessa L. Williams
2006	Chevrolet Corvette C6 (Jay Leno)	James Caan	Hannah Teter and Gretchen Bleiler	Fergie
2007	Chevrolet Corvette C6 (Cal Ripken)	Nicolas Cage	Phil Parsons	Big & Rich
2008	Chevrolet Corvette C6 (Junior Johnson)	24 then living Daytona 500 Champions	Richard Petty	Trisha Yearwood
2009	Chevrolet Camaro SS (Tom Cruise)	Charlie Crist	Bobby Allison	Gavin DeGraw
2010	Ford Mustang GT (Richard Petty)	Junior Johnson	Glen and Leonard Wood	Harry Connick Jr.
2011	Chevrolet Camaro SS (Brad Paisley)	Josh Duhamel, Rosie Huntington-Whiteley, and Michael Bay		Martina McBride
2012	Toyota Camry	Kate Upton and Jane Lynch	John Cena (Sunday); The Wood Brothers family (Monday)	Pat Monahan
2013	Chevrolet SS (Mark Reuss)	James Franco	Ray Lewis	Clay Cook
2014	Chevrolet SS	Chris Evans	Gary Sinise	Aloe Blacc
2015	Toyota Camry (Amy Purdy)	Vince Vaughn	Abby Wambach	Phillip Phillips
2016	Toyota Camry (John Cena)	Gerard Butler	Ken Griffey Jr.	82nd Airborne Division Chorus
2017	Chevrolet Camaro (Jeff Gordon)	Owen Wilson	LaDainian Tomlinson	Jordin Sparks
2018	Toyota Camry (Peyton Manning)	Dale Earnhardt Jr.	Charlize Theron	Navy Band Southeast
2019	Chevrolet Silverado (Dale Earnhardt Jr.)	J. J. Watt	Julian Edelman	82nd Airborne Division All-American Band and Chorus
2020	Toyota Camry (Sheamus) "The Beast" (President & First Lady)	President Donald Trump	Dale Earnhardt Jr.	Nalani Quintello
2021	Chevrolet Corvette	Pitbull	Mercedes Moné	Sam Allen
2022	Toyota Camry (Big E)	Charles Woodson	Lachlan Murdoch	Trace Adkins
2023	Chevrolet Corvette Z06 (Pete Davidson)	Richard Petty, Bobby Allison, Bill Elliott, Dale Jarrett, Jeff Gordon, Jimmie Johnson, Kevin Harvick, Kurt Busch, and Joey Logano	Tiffany Haddish	Breland
2024	Toyota Camry (Madison Marsh)	Dwayne "The Rock" Johnson	DJ Khaled	82nd Airborne Division All-American Chorus
2025	Chevrolet Blazer EV SS (Alan Ritchson)	Anthony Mackie	Wood Brothers Racing	Michael J. Aiello
2026	Toyota Camry (Kurt Russell)	Nate Bargatze	Bart Simpson (person in costume)	Benton Felty

== Race recaps ==
=== 1959–1969 ===
Lee Petty, patriarch of the racing family, won the 1959 Daytona 500 on February 22, 1959, defeating Johnny Beauchamp in a highly unusual manner. Petty and Beauchamp were lapping Joe Weatherly at the finish. Petty, Beauchamp, and Weatherly crossed the finish line three abreast with Weatherly on the outside, Beauchamp on the inside, and Petty in the middle. A photo finish in a race of that duration and speed seemed inconceivable and photo-finish cameras were not installed at the track. NASCAR initially declared Beauchamp the winner. After reviewing photographs and newsreels of the finish for three days, the call was reversed, and Petty was awarded the win. Petty received $19,050 for winning. Ken Marriott was scored as the last place driver having completed one lap and won $100.

In 1960, Robert "Junior" Johnson won, despite running a slower, year-old car in a field of 68 cars, most in Daytona 500 history through the present day. Johnson made use of the draft, then a little-understood phenomenon, to keep up with the leaders.

After three years of being the best driver never to win the Daytona 500, Glenn "Fireball" Roberts came to the 1962 edition race of the Daytona 500 on a hot roll, he won the American Challenge for winners of 1961 NASCAR events, the pole position for the Daytona 500, and the Twin-100-mile qualifier. He dominated the race, leading 144 of the 200 laps and finally won his first (and ultimately only) Daytona 500.

In 1963, it was DeWayne "Tiny" Lund who took the victory for the Wood Brothers, however the real drama began a couple weeks before the race when Lund helped pull 1961 winner Marvin Panch from a burning sportscar at a considerable risk to himself. As a result of his heroism, the Wood Brothers asked Lund to replace Panch in the Daytona 500 and Lund took the car to the winner's circle.

Driving a potent Plymouth with the new Hemi engine, Richard Petty led 184 of the 200 laps to win the 1964 Daytona 500 going away. Plymouths ran 1-2-3 at the finish. The triumph was Petty's first on a super-speedway.

The first rain-shortened Daytona 500 was the 1965 event. Leader Marvin Panch and Fred Lorenzen made contact on Lap 129, as rain began to fall; Panch spun out, and Lorenzen won when the race was finally called on Lap 133. The 1966 Daytona 500, won by Richard Petty, was also shortened, to 198 laps, due to rain.

1967 saw Mario Andretti dominate the race. He led 112 of the 200 laps including the last 33 laps to capture his only win in the Monster Energy NASCAR Cup Series.

The 1968 race saw a duel involving Cale Yarborough and LeeRoy Yarbrough. For much of the day, both drivers traded the lead. With 5 laps to go, Cale made a successful slingshot pass on the third turn to take the lead from LeeRoy and never looked back as he won his first Daytona 500 by 1.3 seconds. LeeRoy Yarbrough would inflict the same treatment on Charlie Glotzbach the next year, winning the 1969 Daytona 500 on the last lap.

=== 1970–1979 ===
The 1970s opened with Cale Yarborough qualifying at pole with a 194.015 mph (312.237 km/h) run. Fate played a major role in the 1970 race, claiming one driver after another as soon as the green flag fell. Richard Petty, then Yarborough who dropped out after leading 26 of the first 31 laps, Donnie Allison, and A. J. Foyt also dropped out of the race. Later in the race, Pete Hamilton, an unknown driver prior to this race, was contested the lead with the likes of Charlie Glotzbach and David Pearson. On lap 192, Hamilton passed Pearson for the lead, and although Pearson tried valiantly to regain the lead, it was Hamilton who took the checkered flag in front of the largest crowd to ever have seen the Daytona 500 (an estimated 103,800). It was the first of 4 victories Hamilton would have in his brief NASCAR career.

The 1972 race was called a One-Sided Daytona 500. A. J. Foyt cruised lanyard into the lead with about 300 miles to go and captured the victory. It was Foyt's sixth career Winston Cup Grand National victory, and it gave the famed Wood Brothers of Stuart, VA, their third Daytona 500 triumph. They had previously won with Tiny Lund in 1963 and Cale Yarborough in 1968. In the event punctuated by a weak field because of factory withdrawal, Foyt outlasted four rivals and beat runner-up Charlie Glotzbach by nearly two laps. Jim Vandiver was six laps down and finished third; Benny Parsons was fourth and James Hylton fifth. Only three caution flags for 17 laps interrupted Foyt's pace. He averaged 161.550 mph—an all-time record for the Daytona 500.

During the start of the 1974 NASCAR season, many races had their distance cut ten percent in response to the 1973 oil crisis. As a result, the 1974 Daytona 500, won by Richard Petty (his second straight, making him the first driver ever to do it), was shortened to 180 laps (450 miles), as symbolically, the race "started" on Lap 21. The Twin 125 qualifying races were also shortened to 45 laps (112.5 miles). Richard Petty overcame tough luck of his own and capitalized on the misfortunes of Donnie Allison to win his fifth Daytona 500. The 47-second triumph was petty's 155th in Winston Cup Grand National competition. A record 53 laps were run under the caution flag, which reduced Petty's average winning speed to 140.894 mph.

In 1975, it appeared David Pearson was on his way to his first Daytona 500 victory as he built a sizable lead on second place Benny Parsons late in the race. However, Richard Petty, who was several laps behind the leaders, and Parsons hooked up in a draft and began reeling in Pearson who was slowed by lapped traffic. The key moment of the race occurred two laps from the end when contact with a backmarker sent Pearson spinning on the backstretch. Parsons avoided the accident and went on to take the win.

In the 1976 500, Richard Petty was leading on the last lap when he was passed on the backstretch by David Pearson. Petty tried to turn under Pearson coming off the final corner, but didn't clear Pearson. The contact caused the drivers to spin into the grass in the infield just short of the finish line. Petty's car didn't start, but Pearson was able to keep his car running and limp over the finish line for the win. Many fans consider this finish to be the greatest in the history of NASCAR.

For Bobby Allison, the Daytona 500 prior to the 1978 race was not kind to him, in fact he came to the race with a 67-race winless streak but with 11 laps remaining, he pushed his Bud Moore Ford around Buddy Baker to take the lead and never look back as he captured his first Daytona 500 win.

The 1979 Daytona 500 was the first 500-mile (800 km) race to be broadcast live on national television, airing on CBS, whose audience was increased in much of the Eastern and Midwestern USA due to a blizzard. (The Indianapolis 500 was only broadcast on tape delay that evening in this era; most races were broadcast only through the final quarter to half of the race, as was the procedure for ABC's Championship Auto Racing broadcasts; with the new CBS contract, the network and NASCAR agreed to a full live broadcast.) That telecast introduced in-car and low-level track-side cameras, which has now become standard in all sorts of automotive racing broadcasts. A final lap crash and subsequent fight between leaders Cale Yarborough and Donnie Allison (along with Donnie's brother Bobby Allison) brought national (if unwelcome) publicity to NASCAR, with the added emphasis of a snowstorm that bogged down much of the northeastern part of the United States. Donnie Allison was leading the race on the final lap with Yarborough drafting him tightly. As Yarborough attempted a slingshot pass at the end of the backstretch, Allison attempted to block him. Yarborough refused to give ground and as he pulled alongside Allison, his left side tires left the pavement and went into the wet and muddy infield grass. Yarborough lost control of his car and contacted Allison's car halfway down the backstretch. As both drivers tried to regain control, their cars made contact several more times before finally locking together and crashing into the outside wall in turn three. After the cars settled in the grass, Donnie Allison and Yarborough began to argue. After they had talked it out, Bobby Allison, who was lapped at that point, pulled over, began defending his brother, and a fight broke out. Richard Petty, who was over half a lap behind at the time, went on to win; with the brawl in the infield, the television audience scarcely noticed. The story was the talk of the water cooler the next day, even making the front page of The New York Times Sports section. NASCAR, as a national sport, had finally arrived after years of moonshine runners.

=== 1980–1989 ===
- 1980: Buddy Baker won the fastest Daytona 500 in history, at 177.602 mph (285.809 km/h).
- 1981: With 24 laps to go, Richard Petty came to the pits for his final scheduled pit stop. Instead of changing tires, the team gambled and only took on fuel. Petty shocked the other drivers as he returned to the track in the lead. Petty became the first driver to win the Daytona 500 in three different decades.
- 1982: In the early laps of the 1982 race, Bobby Allison's bumper flew off, allowing his No. 88 Buick Regal to go faster, in an incident known as "Bumpergate". Allison won the 1982 Daytona 500 in spite of this. It was also the first Daytona 500 chosen to be the first race of the NASCAR season.
- 1983: Cale Yarborough was the first driver to run a qualifying lap over 200 mph (320 km/h) at Daytona in his No. 28 Chevrolet Monte Carlo. However, on his second of two qualifying laps, Yarborough crashed and flipped his car in turn four. The car had to be withdrawn, and the lap did not count. Despite the crash, Yarborough drove a back-up car (a Pontiac LeMans) to victory, taking the lead from Buddy Baker on the last lap with a duplicate of the pass he attempted on Donnie Allison in 1979.
- 1984: Cale Yarborough completed a lap of 201.848 mph (324.828 km/h), officially breaking the 200 mph (320 km/h) barrier at Daytona. He won the race for the second year in a row, and fourth time in his career, with the identical last-lap pass, this time outpacing Darrell Waltrip.
- 1985: Bill Elliott dominated the race, and by lap 140, was close to lapping the entire field except for second place. During a pit stop, NASCAR officials held him in the pit area in order to repair a supposed broken headlight assembly. The two-minute pit stop dropped him to third, barely clinging to the lead lap. Elliott made up the deficit mostly under green. Elliott survived a late race caution and a final lap restart to win his first Daytona 500. Elliott would go on to win the first Winston Million.
- 1986: The race that came down to the final 70 laps (all run under green); a two-car race involving Dale Earnhardt and Geoff Bodine. Earnhardt led for 10 laps while Bodine led for 60. With 3 laps to go, Earnhardt was forced to make a pit stop for a "splash 'n go". However, as Earnhardt left the pits he burned a piston, allowing Bodine to cruise to victory by 11.26 seconds.
- 1987: Bill Elliott qualified for the pole position at an all-time Daytona record of 210.364 mph (338.532 km/h). He had already won convincingly in the 1985 race, and won his second Daytona 500 in 1987 in similarly dominating fashion.
- 1988: Restrictor plates were mandated to reduce dangerously high speeds at Daytona and its sister track, Talladega Speedway. The race began despite uncertainty about how well these would work. Eventually, Bobby Allison and his son Davey Allison finished one-two and celebrated together in Victory Lane. Bobby Allison thus became the oldest driver to win the Daytona 500. The race is also remembered for Richard Petty's wild accident on lap 106. Petty spun, became airborne and tumbled along a large section of catch fence before his car came to a stop. The car was then torn nearly in half from hits by A. J. Foyt and Brett Bodine. Petty escaped without serious injury. Restrictor plates remain in use at Daytona and Talladega to this day despite a disposition to create pack racing and a phenomenon known as The Big One.
- 1989: Darrell Waltrip finally won the Daytona 500 after 17 attempts. (Coincidentally, the car he drove to victory, the Tide Ride, wore number 17.) Waltrip amazingly stretched his fuel for the last 53 laps, meanwhile, most of his competitors were forced to pit. Waltrip ran out of gas as he pulled into Victory Lane. Fans loudly cheered the childlike exuberance of Waltrip's victory celebration. As he was being interviewed by CBS pit reporter Mike Joy, Waltrip shouted, "I won the Daytona 500! I won the Daytona 500!" Shortly after, an exuberant Waltrip performed an "Ickey Shuffle" dance in Victory Lane, and ruined his helmet spiking it to the ground.

=== 1990–1999 ===
- 1990: After several years of futility, Dale Earnhardt appeared headed for certain victory until a series of events in the closing laps. On lap 193 Geoff Bodine spun in the first turn, causing the third and final caution of the race. All of the leaders pitted except Derrike Cope, who stayed out to gain track position. On the lap 195 restart, Earnhardt re-took the lead. On the final lap, going into turn three, Earnhardt ran over a bell housing from the blown engine of Rick Wilson's car. He blew a tire, slowed suddenly, and veered out of the groove, allowing the relatively unknown Cope to slip by and take his first of only two career Cup Series wins in a major upset.
- 1991: Dale Earnhardt's Daytona 500 frustrations continued as Ernie Irvan passed Earnhardt with six laps to go to. Earnhardt's day started out on a sour note, as he hit a seagull in the opening laps. The damage inflicted by the bird affected the aerodynamics, and damaged the radiator, causing high water temperatures. Ultimately, Earnhardt spun out with two laps remaining and collected Davey Allison and Kyle Petty. Irvan coasted on fumes on the final lap as the race ended under the caution flag. The race was dominated by complex pit stop rules, implemented to improve safety in the pit area.
- 1992: Davey Allison dominated the second half en route to his lone Daytona 500 victory. He avoided the "Big One" on lap 92 and went on to lead the final 102 laps.
- 1993: Rookie Jeff Gordon made a splash, winning one of the Budweiser Duels, and leading the opening lap of the race. He would finish in the top five. On lap 170, a frightening wreck occurred that saw Rusty Wallace flip over multiple times on the back straightaway. With two laps to go, Dale Earnhardt was leading Gordon and Dale Jarrett. Using a push from fourth place Geoff Bodine, Jarrett battled into the lead with one lap to go. In the broadcast booth, his father and former Cup champion Ned Jarrett became his son's biggest fan on national TV. It was the fourth time Earnhardt had been leading the Daytona 500 with less than ten laps to go, but failed to win.
- 1994: After the deaths of Davey Allison and Alan Kulwicki, the Cup circuit experienced several team/driver changes for 1994. In the offseason, Sterling Marlin landed in Ernie Irvan's former ride at Morgan-McClure Motorsports. Between father (Coo Coo) and son (Sterling), the Marlin family was 0-for-443 in Winston Cup starts. Marlin gambled on fuel, and was able to complete the final 59 laps on his tank of fuel to win his first career Cup victory. The win, however, was overshadowed by tragedy earlier in Speedweeks, as Neil Bonnett and Rodney Orr were killed in practice crashes.
- 1995: Sterling Marlin became the first driver since Cale Yarborough, and only third overall, to win back-to-back Daytona 500s. During a late caution, Marlin stayed out in the lead, while many of the leaders pitted for new tires. Dale Earnhardt dramatically charged from 14th to 2nd, but Marlin managed to hold him off on the final lap, despite running on old tires.
- 1996: Dale Jarrett won his second Daytona 500 in four years, again holding off Dale Earnhardt, who finished second for the third time in four years.
- 1997: Jeff Gordon became the youngest driver to win the Daytona 500 at that time. Gordon and his Hendrick Motorsports teammates Terry Labonte and Ricky Craven ganged up on race leader Bill Elliott during the final ten laps. The race ended under the caution flag, as the teammates grabbed a 1-2-3 finish.
- 1998: Dale Earnhardt finally won the Daytona 500 after 20 years of trying. Though Earnhardt had usually been a strong competitor in the Daytona 500, mechanical problems, crashes or bad luck had prevented him from winning the race. In 1998, however, Earnhardt was leading when Lake Speed and John Andretti made contact on Lap 198, causing the race to end under caution. After his victory, a joyous Earnhardt drove slowly down pit road, where members of other race teams had lined up to give him handshakes and high-fives. The victory was widely celebrated, even by people who weren't his fans, and was a defining moment in Earnhardt's career and legacy. Mike Joy, who was play-by-play announcer for CBS's broadcast in 1998 (his first play-by-play call of the Daytona 500) called the win "the most anticipated moment in racing".
- 1999: Jeff Gordon grabbed his second Daytona 500 win using drafting help from Dale Earnhardt to pull off a daring three-wide pass on Rusty Wallace and Mike Skinner with 10 laps remaining. Gordon then managed to hold off a determined Earnhardt to earn the victory. A wreck on lap 135 saw future champion Dale Jarrett flip over twice in turn 3.

=== 2000–2009 ===
- 2000: Johnny Benson nearly pulled off an upset win, leading in the late stages of the race. Polesitter Dale Jarrett, however, made the winning pass on a restart with only four laps remaining. Jarrett led a pack of three Ford drivers to gang up and nudge Benson in turn 2, then draft past him on the backstretch. It was Jarrett's third Daytona 500 victory. The race was widely criticized by media and fans for being uncompetitive due to a restrictive aerodynamic rules package. Dale Earnhardt later complained to the media, "[The rules] took NASCAR Winston Cup racing and made it some of the sorriest racing. They took racing out of the hands of the drivers and the crews. We can't adjust and make our cars drive like we want. They just killed the racing at Daytona. This is a joke to have to race like this." Earnhardt's complaint likely was the result of the fact that there were an unusually slim 9 lead changes amongst only 7 drivers.
- 2001: Also known as Black Sunday, or the darkest day in NASCAR, as Dale Earnhardt died in a crash on the final lap. This was the second restrictor plate race run under a rules package that was intended to increase competition after the lackluster 2000 event and complaints from drivers like Earnhardt. Though it was meant to give power back to the drivers and help produce more lead changes, critics ultimately charged that it created dangerously close racing conditions, as cars raced three wide for long stretches. However, the race was also one of the cleanest, as there were only three caution flags (one of which temporarily was a red flag) in the entire race. A crash on the back straightaway on lap 173 eliminated eighteen cars in spectacular fashion and resulted in the race being red-flagged temporarily for cleanup. Tony Stewart took the worst ride, as his car went over Robby Gordon and flipped end-over-end before coming to a rest in the infield. Kurt Busch made his Daytona 500 debut driving in the No. 97 Roush Ford. Michael Waltrip, making his first start for DEI was leading the race on the final lap, with teammate Dale Earnhardt Jr. second. Team owner Dale Earnhardt (driving his familiar RCR entry) was running third, blocking for his two drivers. In turn 4, Earnhardt lost control after contact from Sterling Marlin, and crashed into the outside wall, taking Ken Schrader with him. Earnhardt suffered a fatal basilar skull fracture, at the same time his team cars were crossing the finish line 1st-2nd. The tragedy ushered in a new era of safety in NASCAR. The 2001 race also marked the beginning of NASCAR's new television contract with Fox.
- 2002: Sterling Marlin was battling Jeff Gordon for the lead when they made contact, sending Gordon's car spinning, and triggering a multi-car crash. NASCAR red-flagged the race so it would not finish under caution, and stopped the field momentarily on the backstretch. Concerned about a damaged right front fender, Marlin jumped out of his car and started pulling the fender away from the tire. As working on the car is prohibited during red flag conditions, Marlin was penalized, and sent to the tail end of the field for the restart. Ward Burton survived the wacky last ten laps, and posted the biggest victory of his career.
- 2003: Michael Waltrip became a two-time winner after the race was shortened to 109 laps due to rain. It was the shortest ever recorded Daytona 500.
- 2004: Dale Earnhardt Jr. and Tony Stewart dominated the race, combining to lead 156 of 200 laps. With twenty laps to go, Earnhardt Jr. got past Stewart in turn 3 without drafting help, and won the race exactly six years to the date after his father's celebrated win.

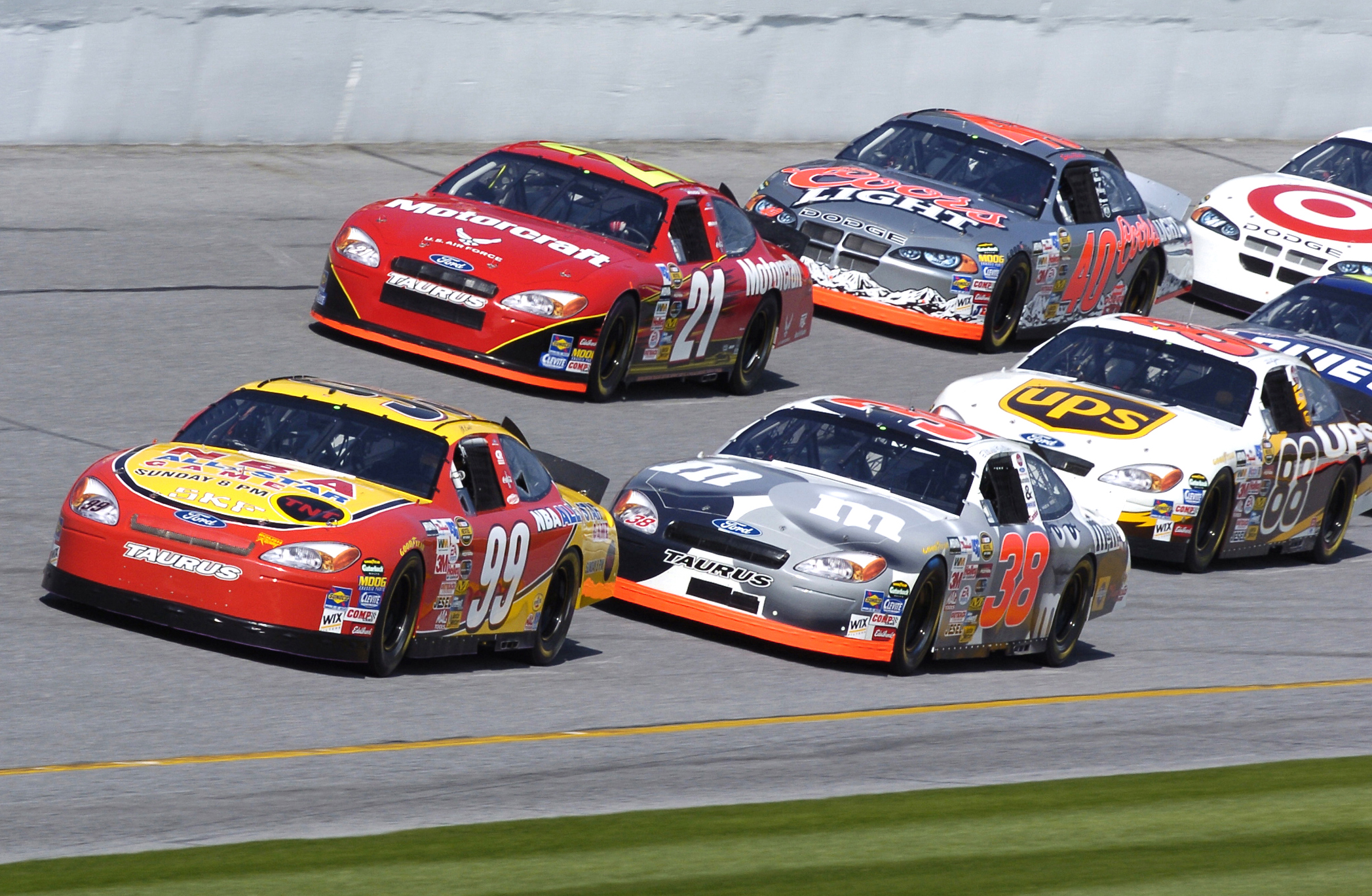
Practice for the 2004 Daytona 500.

- 2005: The start time was changed, allowing the race to finish under the lights at dusk. Dale Earnhardt Jr. made a popular charge to the front on lap 197, but made his move too soon, and Jeff Gordon slipped by to re-take the lead. In the first use of the green–white–checkered finish rule in the Daytona 500, Gordon held off Earnhardt Jr. to win his third Daytona 500.
- 2006: During post-qualifying inspection, Chad Knaus was ejected for an illegal rear window on the Hendrick Motorsports No. 48 car. During the race, Tony Stewart aggressively blocked Matt Kenseth going into turn 3 on lap 106, sending Kenseth into a dangerous spin in front of the entire field. Misty rain and drizzle lasted most of the race, but did not affect the green flag conditions. The No. 48 team, with Jimmie Johnson driving and Darian Grubb as crew chief for the first of four races following Knaus' ejection and subsequent suspension, won after a green–white–checkered finish.
- 2007: Nearing the end, Mark Martin was leading, looking for his first Daytona victory. A wreck in the final five laps that ended Dale Earnhardt Jr.'s run brought out the yellow, and set up a green-white-checker finish, Kevin Harvick drove from 5th to 2nd in the final two turns. As Harvick approached Martin exiting turn 4, a huge wreck erupted behind them. Martin and Harvick drag-raced to the checkered flag with Harvick claiming victory by 0.02 seconds, the 4th closest finish in NASCAR history. Most of the rest of the field crashed across the finish line. Some controversy surrounded the finish since no caution flag was thrown, and there is disputed visual evidence that suggests that Martin would have been declared winner if the caution flag had come out.

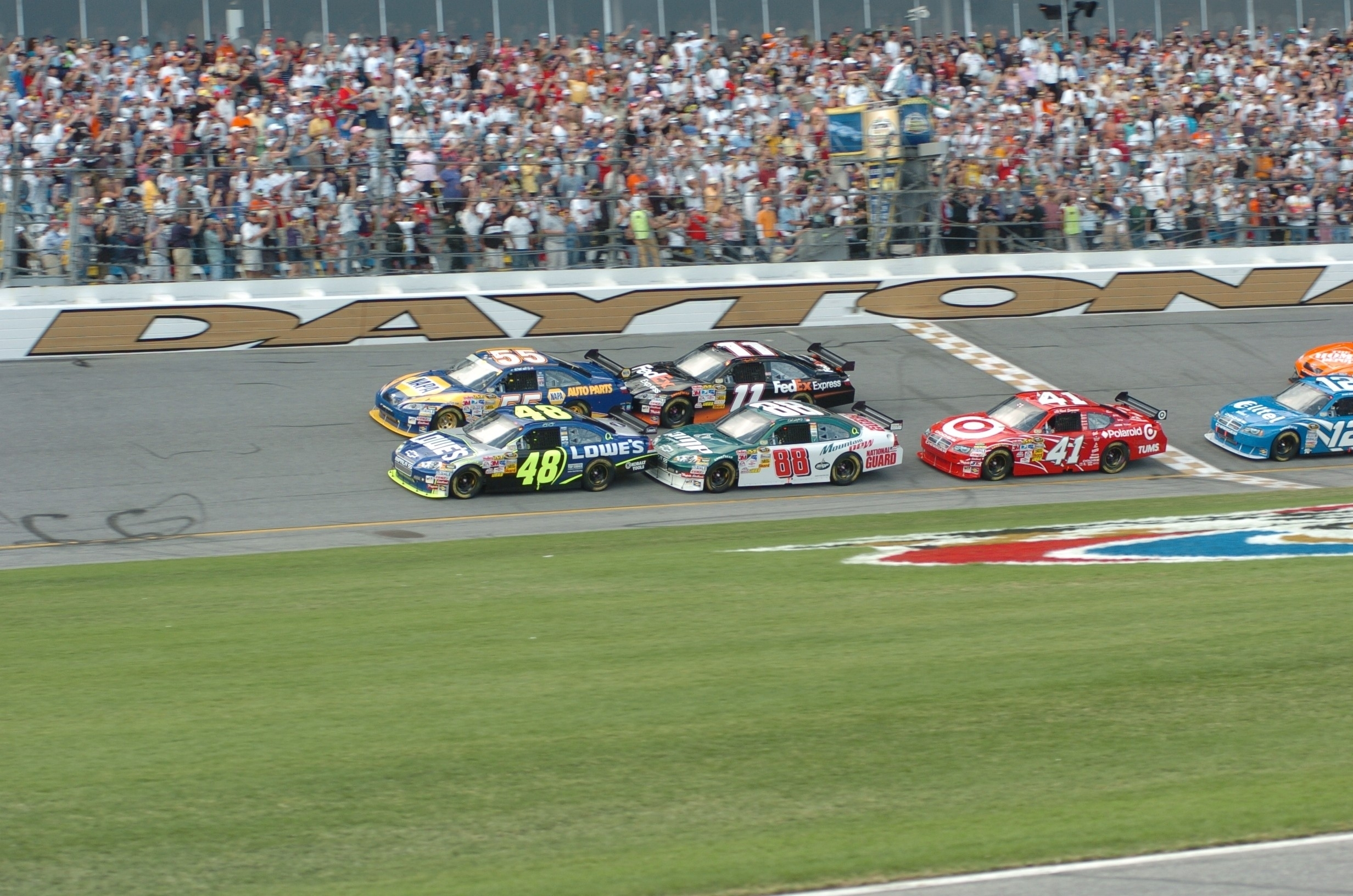
Start of the 2008 Daytona 500. The inside cars are Jimmie Johnson (No. 48), Dale Earnhardt Jr. (No. 88), and Reed Sorenson (No. 41). The outside cars are Michael Waltrip (No. 55) and Denny Hamlin (No. 11).

- 2008: The celebrated 50th running of the Daytona 500 was the first using NASCAR's Car of Tomorrow. It also marked the first race under the "Sprint Cup Series" banner, following the merger of Sprint with Nextel in 2006. The first 150 laps were mostly caution free, with only two yellow flags thrown for debris. But the final 20 laps saw three crashes. On the final restart on lap 197, Tony Stewart stormed past Jeff Burton into the lead. On the final lap down the back straightaway, Stewart dove to the bottom to pick up drafting help from his teammate Kyle Busch. This move proved to be disastrous as it opened the door for Ryan Newman, who surged to the front and took the checkered flag.
- 2009: The race was called on account of rain with 48 laps remaining. The leader at the time of the red flag, Matt Kenseth, was declared the winner, his first Daytona 500 win in ten attempts and the first win for Roush. Kenseth led only one lap under green.

=== 2010–present ===
- 2010: After six consecutive years of moving the start time further from 1 pm to 3:30 pm by 2009 to reach a prime-time finish, NASCAR and Fox agreed to return the race to a 1 pm ET start as part of a uniform agreement on start times of 1 pm, 3 PM, or 7:30 pm for the majority of NASCAR Cup Series races during the season, ending what had become a nearly-standard 2 pm ET start time for Eastern and Central time zone races during the season. An aging asphalt surface, coupled with cool weather and heavy precipitation leading up the race, saw a huge, dangerous, pothole develop on the track in turn 2. Two red flag periods totaling nearly 2 1/2 hours delayed the proceedings, as track crew attempted to fix the damage. Officials eventually filled the hole with Bondo, and the race resumed, finishing in prime-time. During the second green-white-checker attempt, Jamie McMurray passed Greg Biffle and Kevin Harvick on the 207th lap, holding off Dale Earnhardt Jr. to win.
- 2011: After the embarrassing pothole incident of 2010, the Daytona International Speedway was completely repaved for the 2011 season, the first time since 1978. Since this race marked the tenth anniversary of the death of Dale Earnhardt, the third lap of the race was a "silent lap" (previously used in Earnhardt's memory during the 2001 season, meaning the TV and radio announcers were silent during the entire lap, and fans held up three fingers in reference to Earnhardt's car number). Fittingly, Dale Earnhardt Jr. won the pole position, but started last because of a crash during Wednesday practice before the qualifying races. The larger controversy was the two-car tandem racing, which had been proven at Talladega Superspeedway in 2009 on occasion, and the two-car tandem had been much faster than the more traditional multiple-car packs, forcing NASCAR to adopt pressure relief valves in an attempt to force the cars to overheat, forcing the cars to split from the two-car tandems after a short time. On lap 131, Matt Kenseth demonstrated the quality of the new safety devices when he was turned into the wall from a push by Greg Biffle as hard if not harder than Dale Earnhardt did 10 years previous, and getting out of his car on his own power immediately after. 20-year-old Trevor Bayne, in his first Daytona 500 start and only running a partial Cup schedule in 2011, and making just his second career NASCAR Cup Series start, held off Carl Edwards, David Gilliland and Bobby Labonte to win the race and become the youngest Daytona 500 winner, and second-youngest to win a Cup race (the youngest being Joey Logano, who won a rain-shortened New Hampshire event at nineteen years, one month and four days old). The win also tied the record for fewest starts by a driver before winning his first Cup race (two starts, held by Jamie McMurray, who oddly also pulled the trick in his pre-rookie season, but as a substitute for an injured Sterling Marlin) and the first win scored by a driver ineligible to score Cup points, due to anti-Buschwhacking rules instituted that season (Bayne ran for the then-Nationwide Series points that year).
- 2012: As a result of the NFL moving the Super Bowl into the first Sunday of February permanently in 2004, and eventually the 2010 race having a condensed first weekend (practice, qualifying, and the ARCA and special race being moved to Saturday in order to make Super Bowl day an off-day), NASCAR decided to move the Daytona 500 back to the Sunday of or after Washington's Birthday (February 22, but not the federally observed day), which February 26 in 2012. Rain, however delayed the race a day (forcing the originally-planned honorary starter John Cena to leave for Portland for a WWE commitment), originally planning to reschedule the race for Monday afternoon at 12 noon EST. With radar being inconsistent, and the introduction of the new vacuum-based Air Titan system being discussed, Fox and NASCAR agreed to scrub the noon start in favour of a 7 pm start that Monday night, resulting in the first primetime Daytona 500 start (but the third Daytona 500 to reach primetime). The race is best remembered for the incident on lap 160, when Juan Pablo Montoya crashed into a jet dryer in turn 3 under caution, sparking a lengthy red flag as crews put out the resulting fire and repaired the damage. The race, scheduled to begin at 1 pm EST on Sunday afternoon, ended at approximately 1 am EST Tuesday morning, leading the event to possibly be known as the "36 hours of Daytona". Matt Kenseth held off Dale Earnhardt Jr. and Greg Biffle over the last 40 laps to win his second Daytona 500 and first Daytona 500 to go the distance. Kenseth was the first repeat winner in the Daytona 500 since Michael Waltrip's rain-shortened 2003 race. Besides Montoya's accident with the jet dryer, there were three large crashes in the race itself: one on lap 2 involving five cars, one on lap 188 involving seven cars, and one on lap 196 involving eight cars. It was the first time the Daytona 500 reached last night television.
- 2013: This was the first race with NASCAR's new redesigned Generation 6 body. The big highlight was that rookie Danica Patrick won the pole, the first woman to win a pole in a NASCAR Cup Series race or the Daytona 500. She also was the first woman to lead laps under green flag conditions in the race. Matt Kenseth, now driving for Joe Gibbs Racing, dominated the first 3/4ths of the race before he and Kyle Busch ended their days with engine failures. Two crashes in turn 1 eliminated a number of cars from contention. In the final laps, Jimmie Johnson and Brad Keselowski were battling for the lead. On the last restart, Johnson pulled away, holding off Dale Earnhardt Jr. and Mark Martin to win his second Daytona 500. This marked the first time Johnson had finished better than 27th in this race since winning in 2006, and first win in the 500 for the 2014 Chevrolet SS, which was a captive import and rebadge of Holden's Australian manufactured VF Commodore. It was also Johnson's 400th career start.
- 2014: For the second year in a row, a rookie won the pole position for the Daytona 500, in this case Austin Dillon in his first ride in the newly renumbered No. 3 Chevrolet SS for Richard Childress Racing, the first time the No. 3 had been used in a NASCAR Cup Series race since Dale Earnhardt's death (the car had been No. 29 with its previous driver, Kevin Harvick, who moved to Stewart–Haas Racing for 2014). The race is also nicknamed the Ten Hours of Daytona, as the green flag was dropped at 1:30 pm and the cars took the checkered flag just after 11:30 pm EST, due to a lengthy 6-hour 22-minute delay just 39 laps into the race for thunderstorms and a tornado warning in the area. Dillon started off leading the first lap, but faded back afterwards. Denny Hamlin, Kurt Busch, Kyle Busch and Paul Menard were the strongest cars during the first 40 laps. Martin Truex Jr., who had switched to a backup car after a last-lap crash during his Duel, was the first driver out, blowing an engine five laps before the red flag. When the race restarted around 8:45 pm EST, the race saw much more intense competition due to cooler track temperatures and increased tire grip. Although the threat of rain became persistent after lap 150, the storm bands stalled long enough to allow the race to run the full distance. In the last sixty laps, the lead changed hands primarily between Dale Earnhardt Jr. and the Roush Fenway Fords of Carl Edwards and Greg Biffle. A five-car crash at the back of the field with seven laps to go set the field up for a two lap shootout on the final restart. Earnhardt Jr. held off Denny Hamlin, Jeff Gordon and Brad Keselowski over the last two laps, ending when a six-car crash in Turn 4 resulted in a yellow chequer finish, giving Earnhardt his second Daytona 500, exactly ten years and one week after he won his first 500. This was the third straight Daytona 500 to be won by a past winner of the race, after Kenseth in 2012 and Johnson in 2013, and the third Daytona 500 won by a car with the number No. 88 (as Dale Jarrett won the 1996 and 2000 races with the No. 88 for Yates Racing). Thanks to the introduction of a slightly taller rear spoiler to increase drag and downforce in the cars following criticism of a lack of green-flag passing in the previous year's 500, there were 19 leaders and 43 lead changes overall during the race.
- 2015: The race had seven caution flags and was extended to 203 laps and 507.5 miles (816.7 km) due to a green–white–checkered finish. Joey Logano won the race, giving Team Penske a second Daytona 500 victory. Kevin Harvick finished second; Dale Earnhardt Jr. finished third; Denny Hamlin finished fourth, and Jimmie Johnson finished fifth, Casey Mears finished sixth, Clint Bowyer finished seventh; Martin Truex Jr. finished eighth; Kasey Kahne finished ninth, and Greg Biffle finished 10th. Jeff Gordon, running his final full Cup season, won his second pole for the Daytona 500 (his first since the 1999 race) and he also led the most laps with 87; he finished 33rd after being caught up in a last-lap accident. Neither Busch brother competed in this race, as Kurt was suspended for domestic issues and Kyle was injured in a crash during the previous day's Xfinity Series opener.
- 2016: Rookie Chase Elliott started the race from the pole position, in the first race now-Fox commentator Jeff Gordon wasn't driving the Hendrick Motorsports No. 24. Driver Denny Hamlin led 95 laps during the race and passed leader Matt Kenseth on the last lap. Hamlin would then beat Martin Truex Jr. by 0.010 seconds, which would become the closest finish in the Daytona 500. Hamlin's victory is the first Daytona 500 victory by a Toyota, in the first points-paying race after teammate Kyle Busch used an injury waiver to become the first Cup champion to win driving a Toyota. Hamlin became the first driver since Davey Allison in 1992 to lead the halfway lap and win the race.
- 2017: Kurt Busch, in Stewart-Haas' first race driving Fords and with Clint Bowyer now driving retired team co-owner Tony Stewart's No. 14, won the race, the first using NASCAR's new stage racing format and damage policy. The Big One happened shortly before the end of the second stage, eliminating both Kyle Busch and Dale Earnhardt Jr., the latter in his final Daytona 500, among others.
- 2018: 20 years after Dale Earnhardt's 1998 victory, Austin Dillon took the No. 3 back to victory lane with a last lap pass.
- 2019: Several big wrecks occurred throughout the race. Denny Hamlin won his second Daytona 500, while Joe Gibbs Racing teammates Kyle Busch and Erik Jones finished 2nd and 3rd.
- 2020: Donald Trump is the first President of the United States to serve as Daytona 500 Grand Marshal, and the opening lap is paced by the official Presidential state car. The race was abandoned after 20 laps due to persistent rain and delayed until Monday. A Big One on the backstretch with less than twenty laps to go eliminated Jimmie Johnson's chances of a third and final Daytona 500 victory in his swansong season. Another crash in turn 2 with three laps to go set up an overtime finish. Denny Hamlin defended his Daytona 500 win from the previous year and became the first driver to win back to back Daytona 500s since Sterling Marlin in 1994–1995, however his win was overshadowed by a crash coming to the flag that seriously injured Ryan Newman.
- 2021: On lap 14, a 16-car wreck occurred before the race was red-flagged due to rain. The race resumed late in the evening, with Denny Hamlin winning both stages. On the last lap, a big wreck occurred in turn 3 and Michael McDowell scored his first career Cup win.
- 2022: The first race with the Next Gen car. On Lap 63, an eight-car wreck caused by Brad Keselowski, who now was a part owner at RFK Racing, would lead to rookie Harrison Burton flipping his car. Keselowski later turned Stenhouse Jr. with six laps to go in the race. Austin Cindric would hold off Bubba Wallace at the finish line to win the 500 in only his 8th Cup start, while also becoming the second youngest driver to win (behind Trevor Bayne).
- 2023: Kyle Busch, who had just moved from Joe Gibbs Racing to Richard Childress Racing, appeared to have finally snapped his streak at failing to win the Daytona 500, but a caution resulting in several overtime restarts handed the win to Ricky Stenhouse Jr., bringing JTG Daugherty Racing their first Daytona 500 victory.
- 2024: After having their front row start streak broken and a rain delay forcing the race to be postponed to Monday, Hendrick Motorsports' Daytona 500 drought also came to an end in the organization's 40th anniversary season with William Byron winning the race under a caution that was called almost immediately before the white flag was shown. Alex Bowman finished second following a review of the race's finish.
