= Robert Montagu =

Robert Montagu may refer to:

- Robert Montagu, 3rd Earl of Manchester (1634–1683), English politician and courtier
- Robert Montagu, 3rd Duke of Manchester (c. 1710–1762), MP
- Robert Montagu (politician) (died 1693)
- Robert Montagu (Royal Navy officer) (1763–1830), British admiral
- Lord Robert Montagu (1825–1902), British Conservative politician

== See also ==
- Robert Montague (disambiguation)
