= Pontiac Firebird (third generation) =

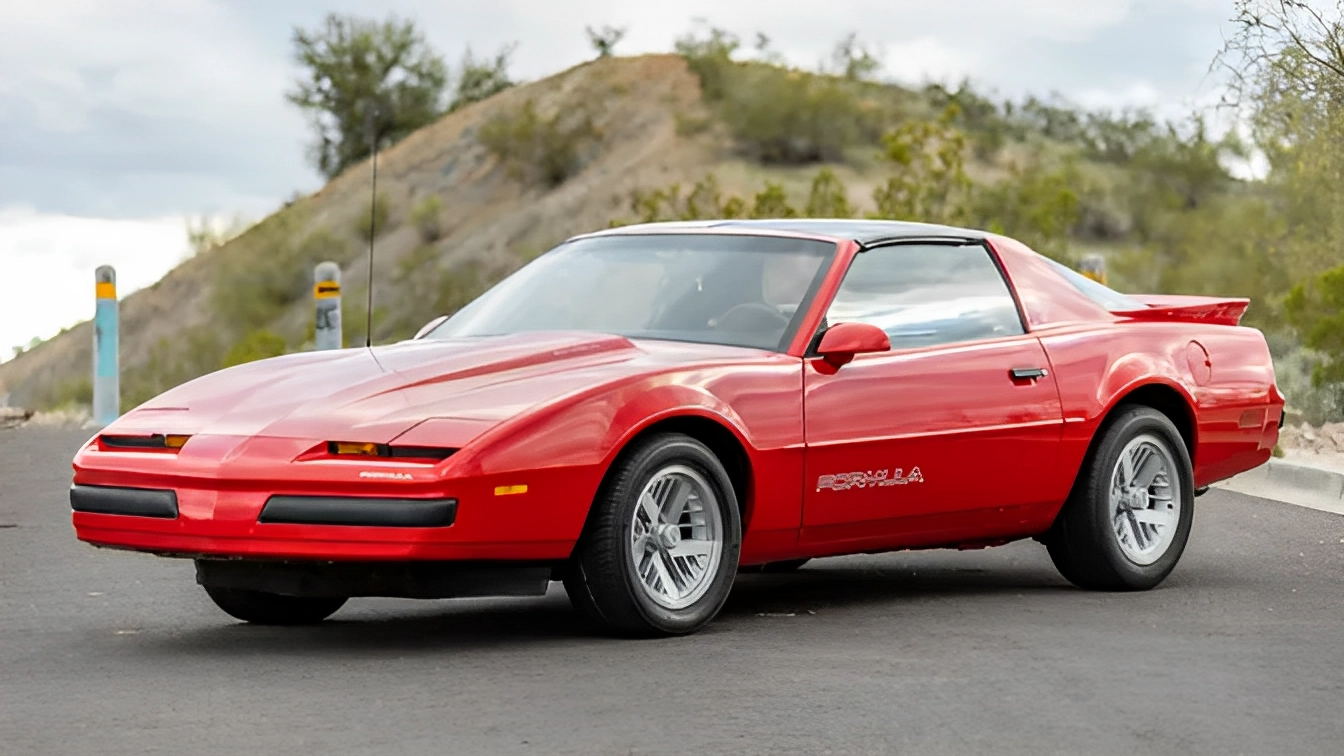
- 1989 Firebird Formula WS6

Overview
- Manufacturer: Pontiac (General Motors)
- Production: 1981–1992
- Model years: 1982–1992
- Assembly: United States: Van Nuys, California (Van Nuys Assembly); United States: Norwood, Ohio (Norwood Assembly)
- Designer: Jerry Palmer, Bill Porter

Body and chassis
- Class: Pony car Muscle car
- Body style: 2-door convertible 3-door liftback coupé
- Layout: FR layout
- Platform: F-body
- Related: Chevrolet Camaro (third generation)

Powertrain
- Engine: 151 cu in (2.5 L) Iron Duke I4; 173 cu in (2.8 L) LC1/LL1/LB8 V6; 191 cu in (3.1 L) LH0 V6; 231 cu in (3.8 L) LD5 turbo V6; 305 cu in (5.0 L) Small-Block V8; 350 cu in (5.7 L) Small-Block V8
- Transmission: 3-speed automatic THM 200C; 4-speed automatic THM 700R4; 4-speed manual 5-speed manual Borg Warner T5

Dimensions
- Wheelbase: 101 in (2,565 mm)
- Length: 1990–1992 Firebird: 195.1 in (4,956 mm); 1990–1992 Trans Am: 195.2 in (4,958 mm); 1982–1988 Firebird: 190.5 in (4,839 mm); 1982–1988 Trans Am: 191.8 in (4,872 mm)
- Width: 72.4 in (1,839 mm)
- Height: 49.7 in (1,262 mm)

Chronology
- Predecessor: Pontiac Firebird (second generation)
- Successor: Pontiac Firebird (fourth generation)

The third generation Pontiac Firebird was introduced in late 1981 by Pontiac alongside its corporate cousin, the Chevrolet Camaro for the 1982 model year. These were also the first Firebirds with factory fuel injection, four-speed automatic transmissions, five-speed manual transmissions, four-cylinder engines, 16-inch wheels, and hatchback bodies.

== 1982 ==
The third-generation Firebird consisted of three models: Firebird, Firebird S/E, and Firebird Trans Am. The Firebird was the base model, equivalent to the Camaro Sport Coupe; the Firebird S/E was the luxury version; and the Trans Am, the high-performance version. For 1982, the new Firebird had been completely restyled, with the windshield slope set at a dramatic, more aerodynamic 62 degrees, (about 3 degrees less steep than anything GM had ever tried before), flush-mounted side glass, and for the first time, a large, glass-dominated rear hatchback. Electronically controlled retractable headlamps, and a rounded hoodline and front fenders were the primary characteristics that distinguished the Firebird from its Camaro sibling and its previous Firebird incarnations. The Firebird would retain hidden headlamps until the end of all production in 2002. Pontiac had also hoped to drop the "Trans Am" moniker from the redesigned cars to save royalties paid to the SCCA for use of the name. Early promotional cars were marked "T/A" as an alternative, however it was decided that doing so might cause more problems than it was worth and the "Trans Am" nameplate remained. Still, with its dimensions reduced, wheelbase shortened, and weight reduced, the third-generation Firebird was also the closest yet in size to the original 1967 model. It won "Best Sports GT" category in the $11,000 to $14,000 range (also along with the Camaro). Road & Track called the fuel-injected Trans Am "a dramatic improvement on its predecessors," accelerating from 0–60 in 9.2 seconds.

The new Firebird shrank to a 101-inch wheelbase, losing more than 8 inches in overall length, measured about an inch narrower, and weighed nearly 500 lb (227 kg) less than its 1981 predecessor. It also was the most aerodynamic production Firebird to date with a drag coefficient of 0.33. The new Trans Am took things a bit further, with a coefficient of .32. The Trans Am body would continue to improve aerodynamically over the years, and by 1985 would be the most aerodynamic vehicle to ever be released from General Motors with a 0.29 coefficient of drag. Wind tunnels were used to form the third-generation F-Body's shape, and these aerodynamic developments were fully taken advantage of by Pontiac's design team. The sleek new car had a low slung front end which featured split grilles. They fed some air to the radiator but most of the air came from an air dam underneath the front bumper. Every piece of the car was designed to reduce drag. The newly designed side view mirror housings, made of light alloy metal, were almost cone shaped, with the point facing the wind. The windshield wipers were hidden under the hood with the air intake for the climate control system. It made for a smooth flow of air over the windshield. The retractable headlamps popped up from the leading edge of the hood. Smooth wheelcovers were available on the Trans Am, attached to turbine finned alloy wheels. A frameless, flush-mounted, compound curved rear glass hatchback decklid provided 30.9 cu ft (0.87 m^{3}). of cargo space with the rear seats folded, and an optional wiper. It provided no disturbance to the airflow over the back of the car. All of these features combined to provide a low coefficient of drag. The front end of the vehicle featured 10.5-inch (270 mm) power disc brakes and were now standard on all Firebird models. Taking styling cues from the 1981 design, the new car had full width tail lights, complete with a Firebird emblem in the center. The all-new suspension design was more advanced and aggressive than anything Detroit had offered previously, easily rivaling the Corvette's handling abilities, (but not its sophistication). The front suspension utilized MacPherson struts, with inboard mounted coil springs and lower front control arms. In the rear, coil springs and shocks were positioned between the body and solid rear axle, with twin rear lower control arms/trailing links and a torsion bar, replacing the old-fashioned leaf springs design used previously in the 2nd generation Firebird. A huge torque arm was mounted from the transmissions tailshaft to the rear axle center to further stabilize the axle's tendency to twist.

The interior now featured aircraft inspired details and gauges, using both fake and real Torx head screws that fastened the dash and console trim panels. A 3-spoke steering wheel was used and featured a clear plastic 3D Firebird logo button, mounted in the center of the horn pad, with optional leather grip. Many power options could be had. Special Viscount "PMD" bucket seats were optional, featuring a small opening in the headrest and a PMD logo in the center of the backrest. Leather seats were also available on both the standard seats and Viscount "PMD" seats. A standard locking rear glovebox was mounted on the rear driver's side of the cargo area and a mini spare tire was hidden behind the opposite panel on the passenger side. A lockable cargo door on the rear floor area and a retractable cargo area privacy shade were also available as options on all Firebirds. A Limited Edition Trans Am S/E Recaro Edition was also released and included Charcoal Parella cloth Recaro Seats, WS6, Black & Gold exterior, Turbo Hood, and a choice of either the LG4 305 w/ a T10 4 speed or TH200 automatic, or the LU5 Crossfire fuel-injected 305 w/ TH200 automatic, and a lengthy list of standard options.

The Firebird lineup was available with several engines:

1. The standard fuel-injected 90 hp 2.5L 4-cylinder Pontiac "Iron Duke": This marked the first time a 4-cylinder engine was offered in the Firebird and was the last true Pontiac engine to be offered in the Firebird. This engine was only offered for the first few years of the generation. It provided almost the same power as the V6, but when coupled with the 5-speed manual transmission, provided between 31 and 34 miles per gallon on the highway, depending on the year.
2. There was a carbureted 102 hp 2.8L V6.
3. The LG4 5.0L: Utilizing GM's improved "Computer Command Control" system, the computer-assisted E4ME carburetor, and computer-controlled distributor, this Chevy 305ci produced 145 hp and 240Lbs.Ft. of torque.
4. The LU5 5.0L: The new high-performance "Crossfire Fuel Injection" 5.0L V8, which employed a twin throttle body fuel injection system similar to that used in the 1982 Corvette's "Crossfire" 5.7L, and produced 165 hp.

The Firebird came standard with 14-inch steel wheels, with several wheel options available unique to the base model. 14-inch turbo cast aluminum wheels were standard on the S/E and Trans Am models and featured smooth plastic hubcaps with a Pontiac "Arrowhead" in the center. The WS6 performance package option, available on the S/E and Trans Am, included 4-wheel disc brakes, P215/65R15 Goodyear Eagle GT radials with 15-inch cast aluminum wheels, stiffer springs, thicker 32 mm front & 21 mm rear sway bars, a 12.7:1 quick-ratio steering box, and limited-slip rear differential. Also available was the WS7 option, which was the same as RPO WS6, but utilized rear drum brake. This option was created due to a shortage of rear disc brake components.

The Firebird S/E was Pontiac's attempt to lure buyers interested in more luxury features; it could be had with the basic fuel saving "Iron Duke" I-4 drivetrain, but offered many more Standard Features than a base Firebird, such as a rear wiper, locking gas door, locking rear cargo floor hatch, rear cargo privacy shade, power windows & locks, Deluxe Interior w/ Viscount bucket seats, Tilt Column, Cruise Control. Even the Trans Am's WS6 suspension was available on the S/E. It was delineated from the base Firebird model by "S/E" script on the sail panels, in place of the standard Firebird decals, and the Trans Am's dark tinted tail lights. The interior featured color-coded plastics & material to match the exterior/interior paint scheme. On S/E models equipped with the 14-inch or 15-inch "Turbocast" rims, "Bowling Ball" hubcaps were color-coded to match the car's exterior paint.

The Trans Am came standard with a new incarnation of its traditional "Air Extractors" on the fenders. A dark-tinted version of the base Firebird's tail lights were fitted to the rear of the car and also featured a Silver or Gold "Screaming Eagle" (Phoenix) between them. Rubber "Mini-Spats" (stone deflectors) were mounted just before the front and rear wheels, and were toned down from the 70's design used on the earlier second generation Trans Am. Styled loosely after the earlier '80/'81 Turbo Trans Am, an optional "Turbo Bulge" hood was available on the Trans Am. Plans had originally been made to use a refined version of Pontiac's 4.9 and Turbo 4.9L (301) engine. It was scrapped at the last minute, leaving many to speculate as to what could have been, had the engine been allowed to survive like its turbocharged companion, the Buick Turbo 3.8L V6. Despite this, the Turbo Bulge hood remained on the option list; on the V-8 RPO LU5 Crossfire 305 V-8, it was made functional, and even a lightweight aluminum version of this hood, "RPO T45", was available on the option list. The steel version of the hood would be used in later years as the centerpiece of the Formula option and in 1990, the remaining inventory of aluminum turbo hoods were sent to SLP for the '91-'92 Formula Firehawks. A new, smaller "Phoenix" was placed upon the Turbo Bulge hood or on the nose of flat hood equipped T/A's. The Trans Am came standard with one of the two 305 Chevy V8s. The well-worn Borg-Warner 4-speed manual transmission came mated only to the 145 bhp LG4 305ci, while the Crossfire-injected LU5 305ci rated at 165 hp came with the TH-200c automatic 3-speed transmission.

The new version of the Trans Am Pontiac's "RPO Y84" Black and Gold Trans Am S/E, made famous by Burt Reynolds and Jackie Gleason in 1977's "Smokey and the Bandit", carried on into 1982 as the RPO Y82/Y84 Limited Edition Trans Am S/E Recaro Edition" aka "Recaro T/A". The package added about 25% to the price of a Trans Am. Standard with a host of options, some features included charcoal Parella cloth Recaro seats, t-tops, a black exterior with gold trim, and black "Bowling Ball" hubcaps with special Gold Pontiac Arrowhead emblems on its center, mounted on gold-painted 15-inch aluminum wheels.

Another special Trans Am also returned: the 1982 Daytona 500 Pace Car Edition. These models are quite rare, and much is still unknown about how many were built or how they were optioned. All were bright red, with special NASCAR decals, similar to both the 1981 Daytona Pace Car and the 1983 Daytona Pace Car. 15-inch aero rims adorned with black bowling ball hubcaps and a WS6 suspension. All had a black interior; it is not known if they included black Recaro seats. As it was Pontiac's debut of the still-fresh third generation Trans Am, it is possible that they would have been optioned with many of Pontiac's best amenities; however few are known to still exist at this time. These cars are featured in 1982 Daytona 500 race footage and in various advertisements.

=== In media ===
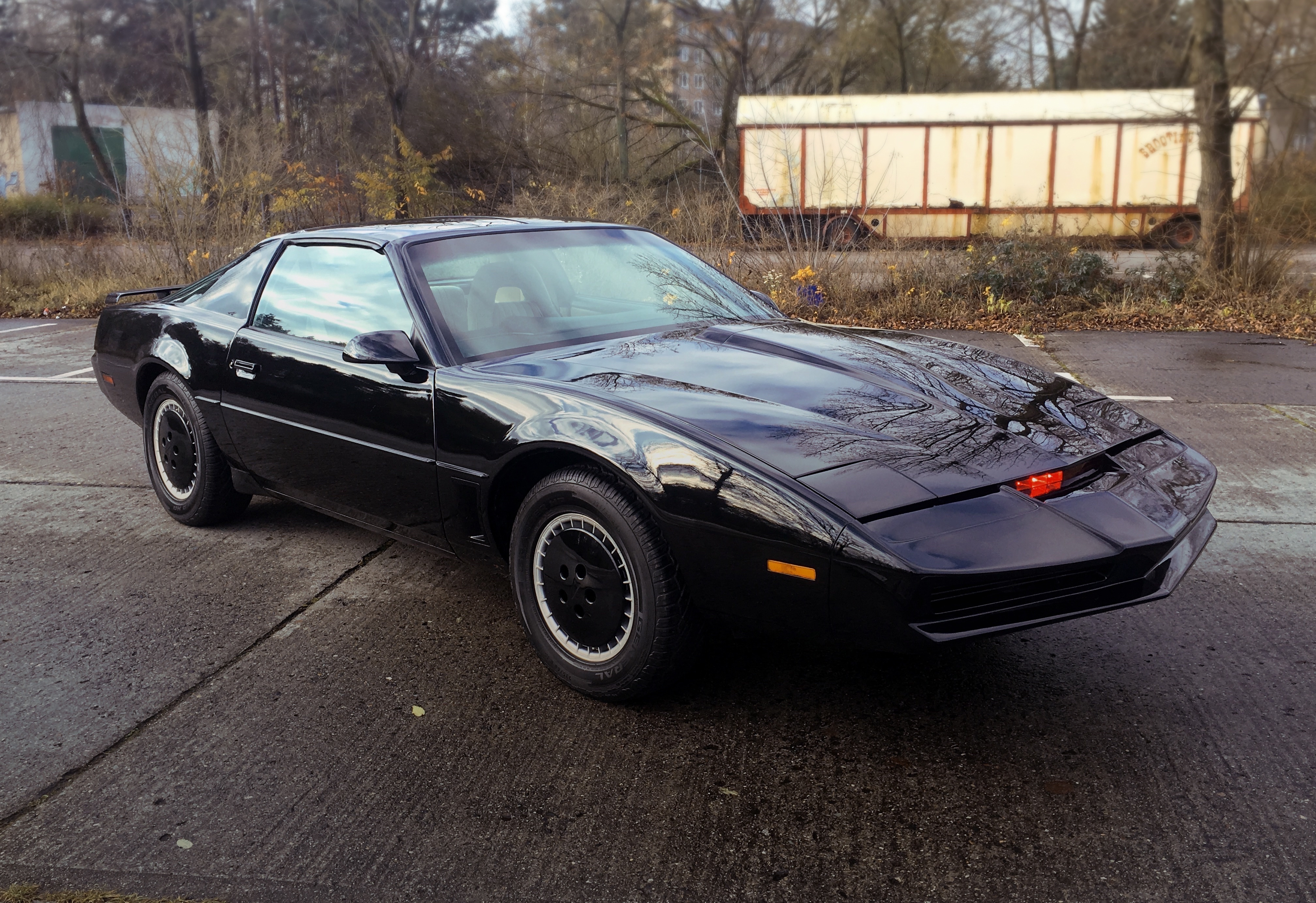
A black Pontiac Firebird Trans Am built to mimic KITT from the TV series Knight Rider.

A modified 1982 third generation black Firebird Trans Am was designed and cast for the NBC television series Knight Rider (1982–1986) as the Knight Industries Two Thousand or KITT, and voiced by William Daniels. It also served as an evil doppelganger called the Knight Automated Roving Robot or KARR, voiced by Peter Cullen, and later by Paul Frees. For the reunion movie Knight Rider 2000, KITT underwent a makeover and became the "Knight Industries 4000," a vehicle resembling the Pontiac Banshee concept car, but it was actually built using a Dodge Stealth and not a Firebird Trans Am.

A red 1982 third generation Firebird Trans Am appeared as the main protagonist's car in Data East's 1985 interactive movie video game Road Blaster.

== 1983 ==
The Firebird remained basically unchanged from the previous model year. All automatic transmission Firebirds now received a T-handle shifter knob, and the shift indicator changed for the Automatic Overdrive 700-R4. Midyear, the L69 high output 305 cubic inch engine was introduced. This carbureted 190 hp V8 was virtually identical to the L69 engine in the Camaro Z28, but used a different air cleaner assembly (instead of the Camaro's dual-snorkel air cleaner, the Trans Am received yet another functional cold air intake, designed to utilize the bulged hood).

The S/E Firebirds now received the H/O (High Output) version of the 2.8-liter V6 engine RPO LL1 This model also received color changes from the 1982 model year; the WS6 special performance package continued to be available on the S/E.

The RPO "Y84" Recaro Edition Trans Am or "Recaro T/A", was revised for 1983. It was now built to the owner's tastes, including many more, or less options, and RPO "Y81" returned as the Recaro Edition Trans Am S/E without T-Tops. The LG4 was standard as was the WS6 package. The exterior remained virtually the same, except now the Firebird logo decals on the sail panels were replaced with gold-plated black and gold Firebird logo medallions. The interior now featured tan leather Recaro seats, carpeting, side panels, and the headliner.

In its second year, the third-generation Trans Am was again selected as the Daytona 500 Pace Car, and Pontiac offered a total of 2,500 Daytona Pace Car replicas through their dealerships. The exterior was painted with a two-tone white/charcoal paint scheme, "Official Pace Car" decals on the doors, "NASCAR" decals on the rear quarter panels, and "PONTIAC" decals on the front windshield and rear glass. Decorating the front fenders just above the "TRANS AM" script were "25th ANNIVERSARY DAYTONA 500" emblems. A new graphic adorned the power bulge of the pace car's hood, and these limited-edition cars were the first to feature a special RPO W62, full-body ground-effects package that extended around the entire car and molded plastic panels. "TRANS AM" script appeared on the right-hand panel, in place of the standard Firebird nose grilles. Two different set of wheels were offered: 1) 15-inch "AERO" wheels with White "Bowling Ball" hub caps, or 2) silver-finned wheels. The interior featured red gauge lighting, leather-clad steering wheel, shifter knob, and brake handle, a special dash plaque, "Daytona 500" floor-mats, and two-tone grey leather/suede Recaro seats. 1,980 of these pace cars came with the LU5 Crossfire-injected 305 mated to the new 700R4 4-speed overdrive automatic transmission; while 520 of them had the carbureted LG4 305 mated to the T-5 Borg-Warner 5-speed manual.

This year also saw the introduction of a two-seat, factory-backed aftermarket-built convertible roadster known as the Trans Am Auto Form Roadster. These cars were built by Auto Form Sales Corporation of Elkhart, Indiana, and involved the removal of the roof and rear hatch and replacing it with a custom rear tonneau cover deck with twin-hump styling which covered the rear seating area. The deck was rear-hinged to open for stowage of the soft-top roof and had a separately-opening section for access to the luggage compartment. Reinforcement was also added to aid in body rigidity after the removal of the roof. A total of 50 examples were produced through to 1986.

== 1984 ==
Total production for Firebird models increased to 128,304 units, making this the best-selling year of the third-generation Firebird.

The Firebird's interior options and design remained virtually unchanged for 1984, the only exceptions being a slightly revised dashpad, with screwed-in speaker grilles, an optional driver's knee pad bolster on the left side of the center console for manual cars, the T-tops were also redesigned to use a pin-mounting arrangement, rather than the earlier latch-based setup, and a new 1-piece horncap embossed with the Firebird logo replaced the earlier medallion version. Base model Firebird production increased to 62,621 units.

The S/E Firebirds also remained virtually unchanged as well, with 10,309 units built.

The Trans Am's basic layout was very similar to the earlier 1983 Trans Am, except they were now available with the optional RPO W62 ground effects package, previously used on the 1983 Daytona Pace Car Edition. Another new for 1984 option was the "High-Tech" 15-inch, 20-slot, concave aluminum wheels, painted gold or silver, with black plastic centercaps containing a gold or silver Firebird logo. The only drivetrain changes made for the 1984 model year were the deletion of the Trans Am only EFI Crossfire 305, a hydraulic clutch was now used on the T-5 Borg-Warner 5-speed manual transmission, and on L69 equipped cars, a lightweight flywheel, and an aluminum bellhousing were employed. L69-equipped Trans Ams also received an 8,000 RPM tachometer, an 80 PSI oil pressure gauge, a high-output single electric fan, a functional cold-air induction hood, a higher output mechanical fuel pump, and a secondary electric fuel pump to help prevent vapor lock. Trans Am production increased to 55,374 units.

The RPO "Y84" & "Y81" Recaro Edition Trans Am S/E's were slightly revised. The 305 H.O. L69 engine was now the only available engine. The exterior still featured a Black painted body, but gone was the Gold paint on the lower half of the body. All now featured Black painted, RPO W62 Aero package ground effects, the special "RECARO T/A" door handle inserts, the 1983 style gold-plated black and gold Firebird medallions on the sail panels, gold-painted high-tech 15-inch wheels with a black plastic center cap and gold Firebird logo, WS6 package, functional cold air induction "Turbo Hood", with a gold "fade" decal and gold "5.0 Liter H.O." script on the turbo hood's bulge, gold "TRANS AM" decals on the fenders and right side of the rear bumper, a special 3-row gold pinstripe that wrapped around 98% of the lower area of the car, extending up, around the wheelwells, (similar to the second generation Y84 S/E Trans Am's pinstripes). The interior still featured its namesake tan leather Recaro seats. This was the swan song year for Pontiac's black and gold RPO "Y84" Trans Am S/E's, and 1,321 Recaro T/A's were produced.

For the 15th Anniversary of the Trans Am, Pontiac released a white and blue Trans Am, following in the original 1969 Trams Am's color scheme for $3,499 over the base $10,699, and limited to just 1,500 units. It also only utilized the 305 H.O. L69 engine, with 1,000 automatics and only 500 with the T-5 Borg-Warner 5-speed manual transmission. The exterior featured a white painted body, T-tops, white painted RPO W62 ground effects, special blue "TRANS AM" decals on the lower rear half of the doors, blue pinstripes similar to the Recaro T/A except they extend around the entire body, special blue and white 15th ANNIVERSARY medallions on the sail panels, a functional cold air induction "Turbo Hood", with a blue "fade" decal and blue "5.0 Liter H.O." script on the turbo hood's bulge. The black tinted Trans Am tail lights featured white paint on the horizontal bars, and a blue on white Firebird logo on the tail light center panel. Another special item featured only on the 15th Anniversary cars was the all new "Aero-Tech" 16-inch convex aluminum wheels, (front/rear specific). The wheels were painted white, with blue pinstripes around the clear coated polished lip's outer perimeter, and were fitted with Goodyear P245/50/VR16 "Gatorback" uni-directional tires (the new wheel/tire combo was very similar to the Corvette's P255/50/VR16 arrangement), marking the first appearance of 16 by 8-inch wheels on any F-body and a first for Pontiac. The WS6 package was standard with a 15th Anniversary Only 25 mm rear sway bar, (as opposed to the ordinary WS6's 23 mm bar). Interior features included: off-white leather with grey cloth inserts Recaro seats with repeating "TRANS AM' script on the center portions, a special off-white leather-wrapped steering wheel with a special blue and white 15th medallion inset in an off-white horn button, off-white leather-wrapped shifter knob and parking brake handle, and off-white pass-side map pocket with a blue Firebird logo and blue "TRANS AM" script.

== 1985 ==
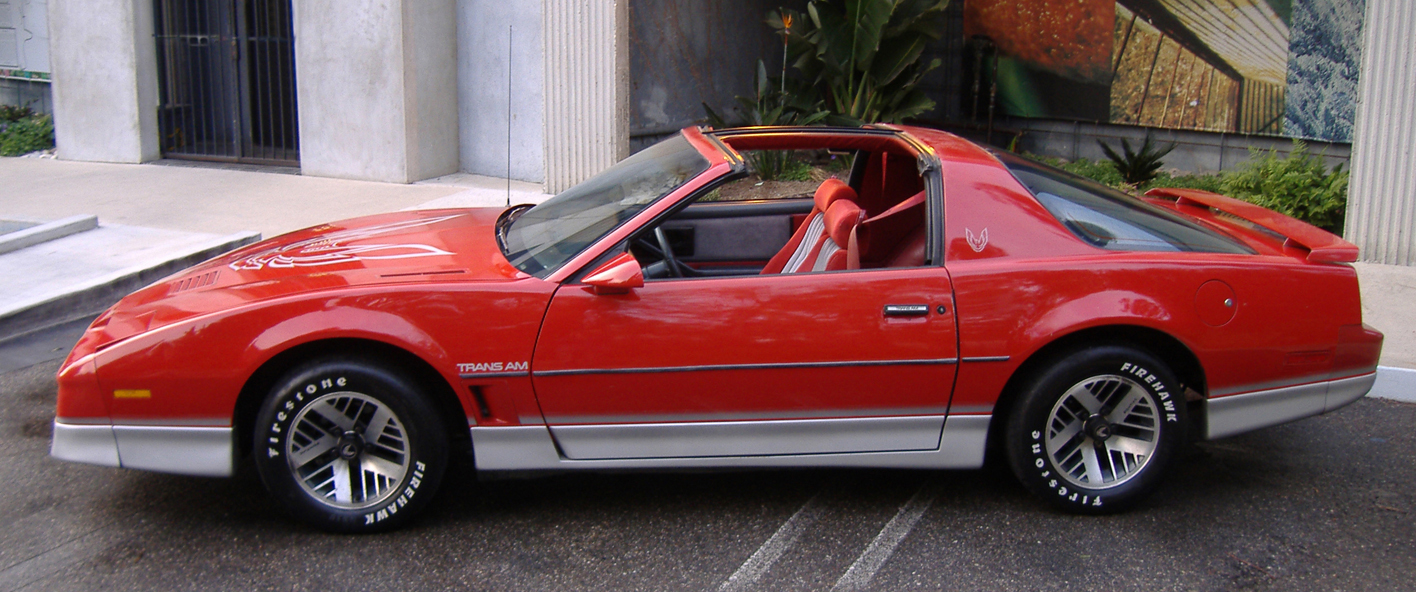
1985 Firebird Trans Am: Pontiac would use this 15-inch "High Tech" aluminum wheel pattern until 1992.

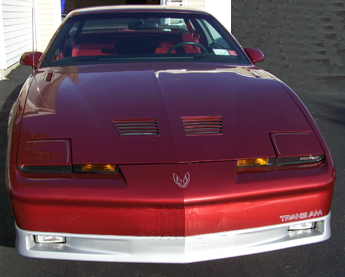
1985's benchmark makeover: restyled nose with integrated fog lights, functional hood "nostrils" and rear edge vents to vent unwanted engine heat out of the engine bay

For 1985, All Firebird models underwent redevelopment to boost sales as a number of power train improvements were introduced. The Firebird received a restyled nose with black wrap-around inserts known as "bumperettes" to replace the grille inserts; wrap-around "bumperettes" were also added to the rear bumper. The tail lights remained unchanged from the previous "louvered" style design. The carbureted V6 was replaced with a new, multi-port fuel-injected 2.8L V6 making 135 hp. The interior evolved with a new dash design containing redesigned gauges that used a graph-patterned background, a slightly refined dashpad, new T-handle shifter for automatics; a padded and more ergonomic center console design, updated stereo and HVAC faceplates, and an optional version of the previous year's more ergonomic 15th Anniversary's steering wheel.

The Firebird S/E underwent some changes as well. It too used the new for '85 nose and rear bumper, but it now included some new items to set it apart. It received a new special hood, similar to the new Trans Am hood except with only the front vents, the new Trans Am tail light design, color-coded Firebird logo medallions on the sail panels, (similar to the '83/'84 Recaro version), and a color-coded rear Firebird logo on the center section of the tail lights. Cloth Recaro seats were also now available.

The Recaro T/A was no longer available, but cloth Recaro seats were optional on the Trans Am.

The Trans Am also underwent changes. The LG4 & L69 continued on, but a new fuel-injected 305ci was now available in the Trans Am. The LB9 Tuned Port Injection (TPI) 305 was released, using a tuned runner design. The LB9 produced 210 hp, which brought it suitable attention from buyers despite being unavailable with a manual transmission. The "Turbo Bulge" hood was discontinued in favor of a new flat hood with twin louvered vents or "nostrils" that were functional, with heat exhaust vents on the rear edges. The Trans Am also received a restyled nose, integral fog lights, and newly redesigned ground effects. It utilized new "low density" taillight lenses with a grid-style pattern rather than the "louvered" pattern in use since 1981. The Trans Am came standard with the "High Tech" 15-inch concave aluminum wheels from the previous year, but it was also now available with the a version of the 15th Anniversary's WS6 suspension and its "Aero Tech" 16-inch aluminum wheels, but in finished Natural Silver. A Borg-Warner 9-bolt differential was made available for the first time, and was said to be stronger than the standard corporate 10-bolt axle. Further attempts to put the Trans Am into higher regard included overhead console from the Camaro lineup, which included several manually adjusted reminder wheels, a positionable map light, a removable flashlight with "FIREBIRD" script, and a small pocket for a garage door opener or sunglasses. The standard rear spoiler from previous years was still standard, but an optional wrap-around "Aero Spoiler" was now available in black and gave the car a new more modern look, (it is unique for 1985 & 1986 as it had a texture). The Trans Am drag coefficient was measured at 0.32 but was as low as 0.29 with the standard Aero wheels instead of the High-Tech turbo aluminum wheels. At the time, it was the most aerodynamically efficient car GM ever produced.

== 1986 ==
All Firebirds received center, high-mounted stop lamps to comply with Federal legislation; these were placed on top of the back hatch window. All cars received restyled, more modern instrument gauges. New tail light lenses were now introduced on the base Firebird, completing the replacement of the "slit" or "louvered" taillight lenses that had been a Firebird signature since 1967. The 2.5L 4-cylinder engine was dropped, replaced by the multi-port fuel-injected 2.8L V6 as the standard engine. The Firebird S/E model was discontinued at the end of the year. The rubber–vinyl wrap-around rear wing became standard on Trans Am (available only in black; as these wings aged, these and those offered on subsequent model-year vehicles would suffer from cracking and splitting problems), the Wing spoiler was a credit option on the Trans Am, and mandatory if the louvered rear window was ordered. Midyear, Pontiac introduced a new light-weight, cross-lace wheel, available for the Trans Am.

Only 26 Trans Ams with the 305 H.O. L69 were built in 1986; it was discontinued because of fuel vapor lock (boiling) problems. Some sources indicate the 305 TPI engine output was decreased from 210 hp to 190 hp caused by switching to a less aggressive camshaft profile, while others maintain it stayed at 210 hp. Paint RPOs were changed to reflect the new base-coat/clear-coat paint process. American Sunroof (ASC), licensed by Chevrolet to build the 1987 Camaro convertible, also built three 1986 Trans Am convertibles as a "design exercise".

In spite of rumors, there were no 350 TPI L98 cars made in 1986 according to Pontiac.

== 1987 ==
The Firebird body remained basically unchanged. All center, high-mounted stop lamps were relocated to a new position under the glass on the deck lid, and the large Firebird hood emblem disappeared forever. All V8s now received factory roller camshafts, and faced with consumer demands for more power, GM officially released the new 5.7L with tuned port fuel injection. Available only with an automatic transmission, it produced 215 hp and takes the top performance seat from the 5.0L TPI which was rated at 205HP. The 5.0L TPI, however, was available with a 5-speed manual transmission and, in fact, was quicker than the 5.7L TPI coupled with the automatic transmission. L69 production was stopped, leaving the LG4 as the only remaining carbureted V8 used in the F-body. Trans Am GTA (Gran Turismo Americano) was introduced, available with the LB9 305 TPI engine (which was returned to 205 hp) or the L98 350 TPI. Gold 16-inch, flat-mesh, diamond-spoke wheels were standard on GTA, with 16-inch, 20-slot wheels standard on Trans Am.

Firebird Formula was re-introduced, available with a choice of V8s (LG4, LB9 305 TPI, or L98 350 TPI), 16-inch convex wheels, and the earlier Trans Am "Turbo Bulge" hood. The wrap-around wing was now made of fiberglass to reduce weight and became standard on Trans Am and Formula; the regular, flat-surfaced spoiler from earlier Trans Am models was now made standard on Firebird. Trans Am and Formula were also offered with an optional 140 mph speedometer.

WS6 was standard equipment on the Formula and GTA from 1987 to 1992, and optional on the Trans Am. WS6 from 1987 until 1992 included 36 mm front sway bars, 24 mm rear sway bars, quick-ratio steering box, gas-filled struts and 16-inch wheels with 245/50R16 tires. Later WS6 cars used ZR rated tires.

The Trans Am GTA was Pontiac's pride and joy with a standard 5.7L 350 Tuned-Port Injection (TPI). Many people like to say, incorrectly, that the engine itself was pulled directly out of the C4 Corvette, which itself began using the engine in 1985, but the heads on the Corvette were aluminum whereas the Firebird heads were cast iron, although it did give the GTA performance numbers comparable to GM's flagship performance platform from whence it came. The GTA came with a standard TH-700R4 (4L60) automatic transmission, air conditioning, new seats with inflatable lumbar and side bolsters, special door panels, epoxy-filled emblems, body-colored ground effects, a special GTA horn button, and the WS6 performance handling package. All of these options were packaged into the Trans Am under the RPO code Y84, and the model was produced until the end of third-generation F-body production in 1992.

Dealerships could finally order a Firebird Convertible from a recognized coach builder that was already converting other GM products (though more than a dozen other companies had been converting F-bodies into convertibles since 1982 for Pontiac & Chevrolet dealers). ASC (American Sunroof Company, Later "American Specialty Cars") (of ASC McLaren fame) offered Pontiac Dealerships a Firebird/Formula/Trans Am/GTA convertible. ASC was contracted to convert all of the official Camaro Convertibles from 1987 to 1992. However, due to fuel economy restrictions mandated by the EPA, a convertible Firebird would have been assessed a $1200 Gas Guzzler Tax because the LB9 & L98 when paired with a Trans Am or GTA would have been lower than 22.5 average MPG. For this reason, Pontiac did not directly offer a convertible through dealers like the Camaro. However, these were not an official Pontiac offering, they are considered coach convertibles. The conversion of the Firebird was identical to the "factory" Camaros of the same model year. The exception was the obvious cosmetic changes, the rear quarter caps, spoiler (which was a base model spoiler cut off) and the high-mount third brake light were Firebird convertible specific.

To order a Firebird Convertible, the dealership would order a T-top Firebird and have it drop shipped to ASC, One Sunroof Center, Southgate, MI 48195 for the conversion alongside "Factory" Camaros. Once complete, ASC would ship the now Firebird convertible to the participating dealership for delivery. This remained the procedure for dealerships through the 1989 model year. According to ASC, they did not convert any Firebirds for the 1990 model year. As popularity increased and car became lighter & more aerodynamic for the 1991 model year, the process was simplified as Pontiac offered a convertible through normal dealer ordering channels via RPO's. A Total of 173 Firebird Convertibles were reported by ASC for 1987.

== 1988 ==
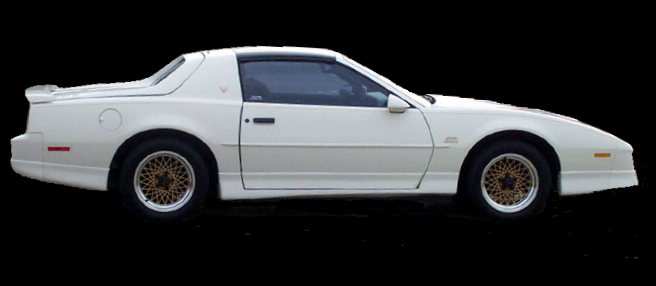
1988 Trans Am GTA Notchback

The Firebird remained basically unchanged. The 170 hp LG4 carbureted 5.0L V8 was dropped in favor of the new 170 hp L03 5.0L V8 with throttle body injection. All V8 engines received serpentine belt systems and the air conditioning compressors were moved to the passenger's side of the engine, de-cluttering the engine compartment. The Firebird Formula received new high tech 16x8-inch aluminum wheels with distinctive silver "WS6" center caps. The GTA wheels were slightly restyled, and the convex 16-inch wheels were dropped as all Trans Ams received the 16x8-inch diamond-spoke aluminum wheels, available in different colors (white, red, charcoal, and black) in addition to the GTA's gold. The GTA received a new steering wheel with integral radio controls. The Trans Am was made available with body-colored ground effects like those on the GTA.

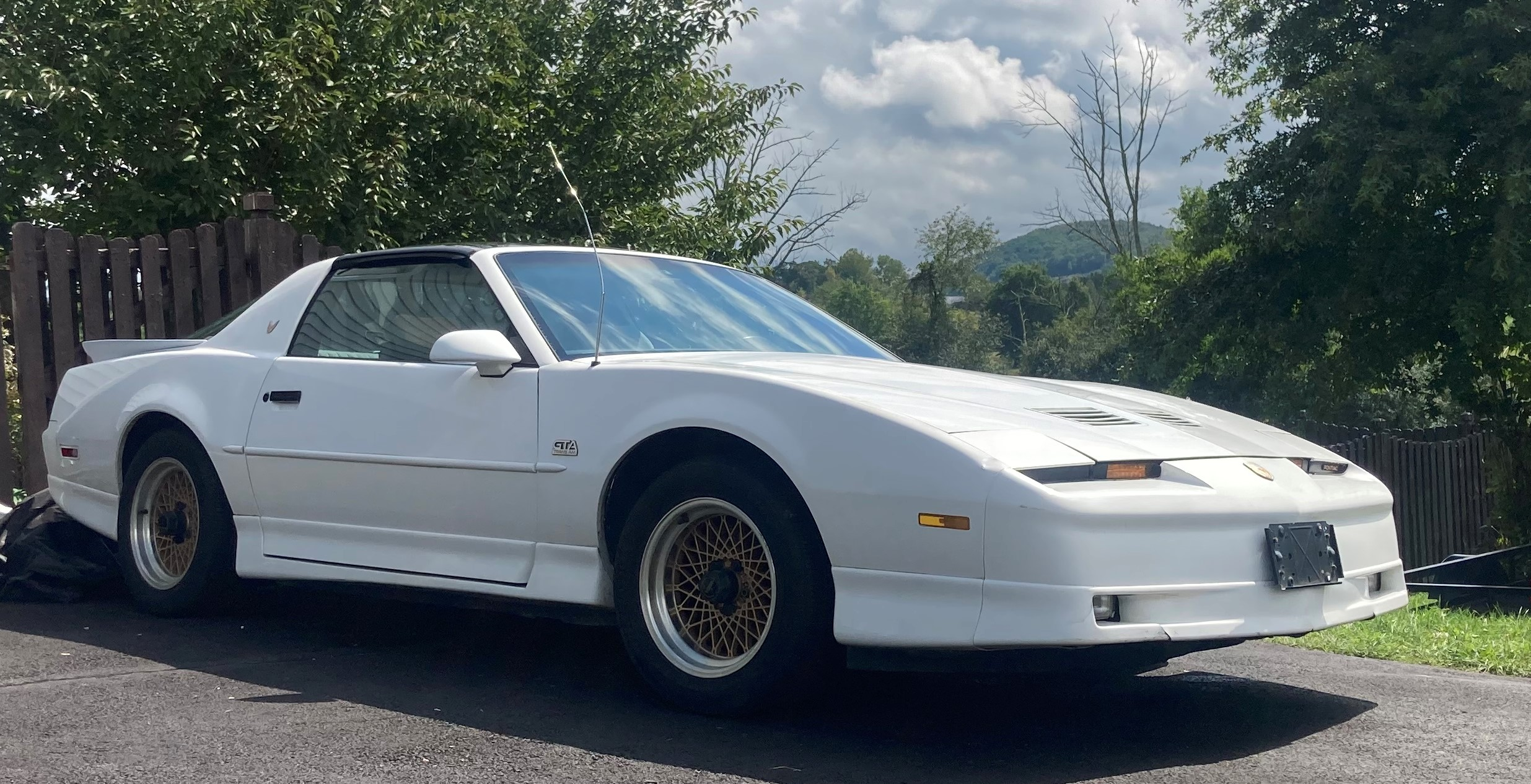
1988 Trans Am GTA equipped with a 305 TPI V8, rare 5-speed manual transmission, and 9-bolt limited-slip rear differential.

The optional convertible model also carried over, and now optional on the GTA was a new "notchback" hatch: rather than the large, glass hatchback that had been common to the Third Generation Firebird, the optional notchback consisted of a fiberglass trunk lid with a small, flat, vertical glass window. The notchback also incorporated redesigned rear seatbacks with integral headrests. The notchback became popular with onlookers, who often assumed the notchback-equipped GTA was a Ferrari, thereby encouraging some owners of the type to dub their GTA the "Ferrari Back". Many Trans Am owners were unaware that the $800 notchback option was even available, and for those who were, the vehicle typically had to be ordered from the factory, on a six-month waiting list, as the notchback was retrofitted to the vehicle. In rare instances, a dealership would get a notchback-equipped GTA on their lot. Another reason for the relative obscurity of the notchback is that the sales information was not very well disseminated to Pontiac salespeople, so many of them had no idea it was available as an option. As attractive as the notchback was, GTA owners were constantly plagued with structural and cosmetic issues with the design. The fiberglass would blister, causing surface bubbles resembling a bad case of acne. The Pontiac repair solutions were simply to sand the notchback down and repaint it, but the problem would always return, and GTA owners could expect multiple trips in order to achieve a final repair of the problem, or to have a new notchback installed. The notchback was intended to carry over and be standard-issue on the 1989 20th Anniversary GTA, but the plan never materialized; the aforementioned quality control issues apparently caused GM not to carry it over to the next year..

ASC continued to offer a convertible for dealerships in 1988. A total of 104 Firebird convertibles are reported from ASC for Pontiac dealerships.

Trans Am GTA production figures US:9765 Canadian:1261

== 1989 ==
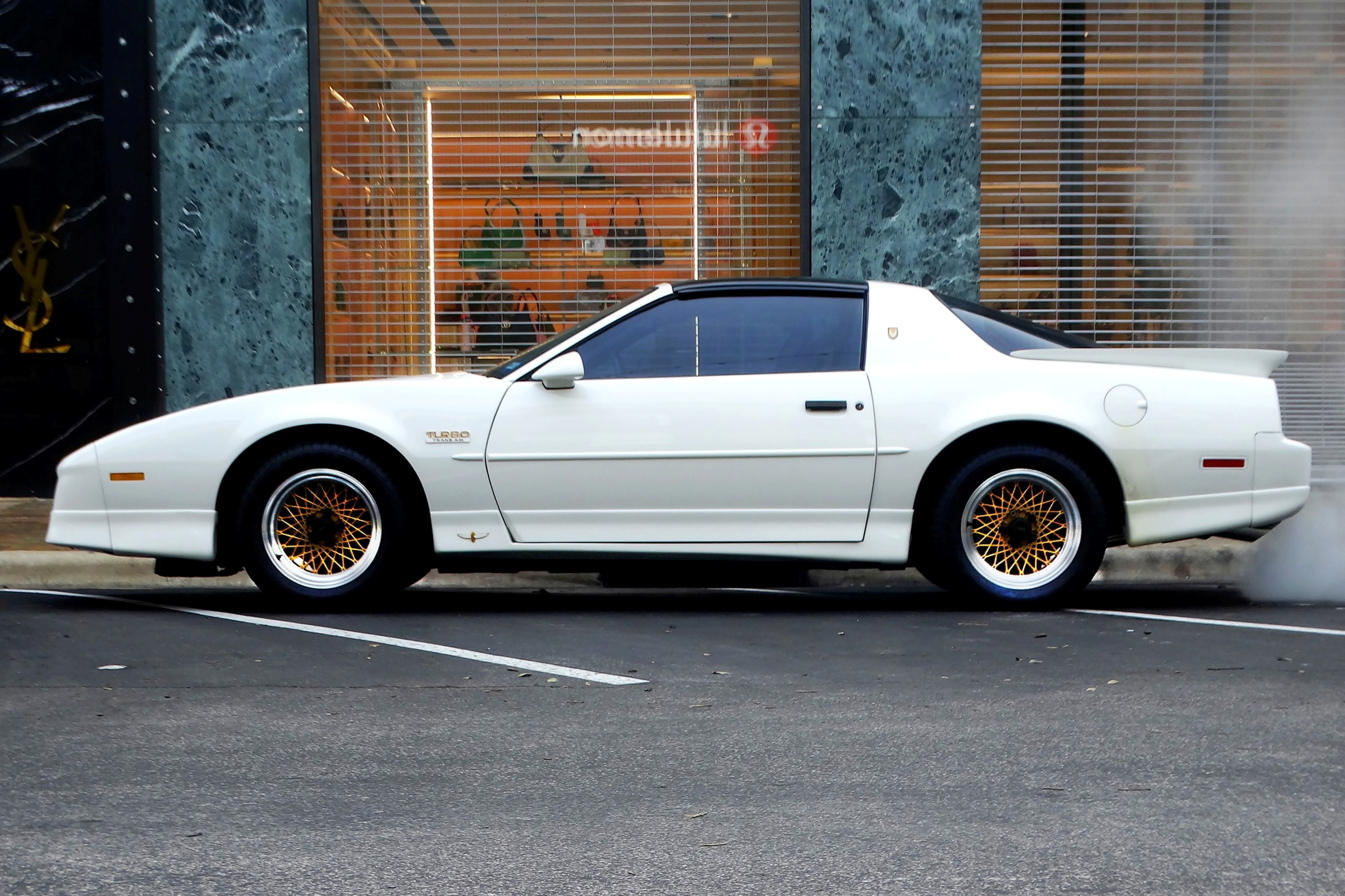
20th Anniversary Turbo Trans Am with T-Tops

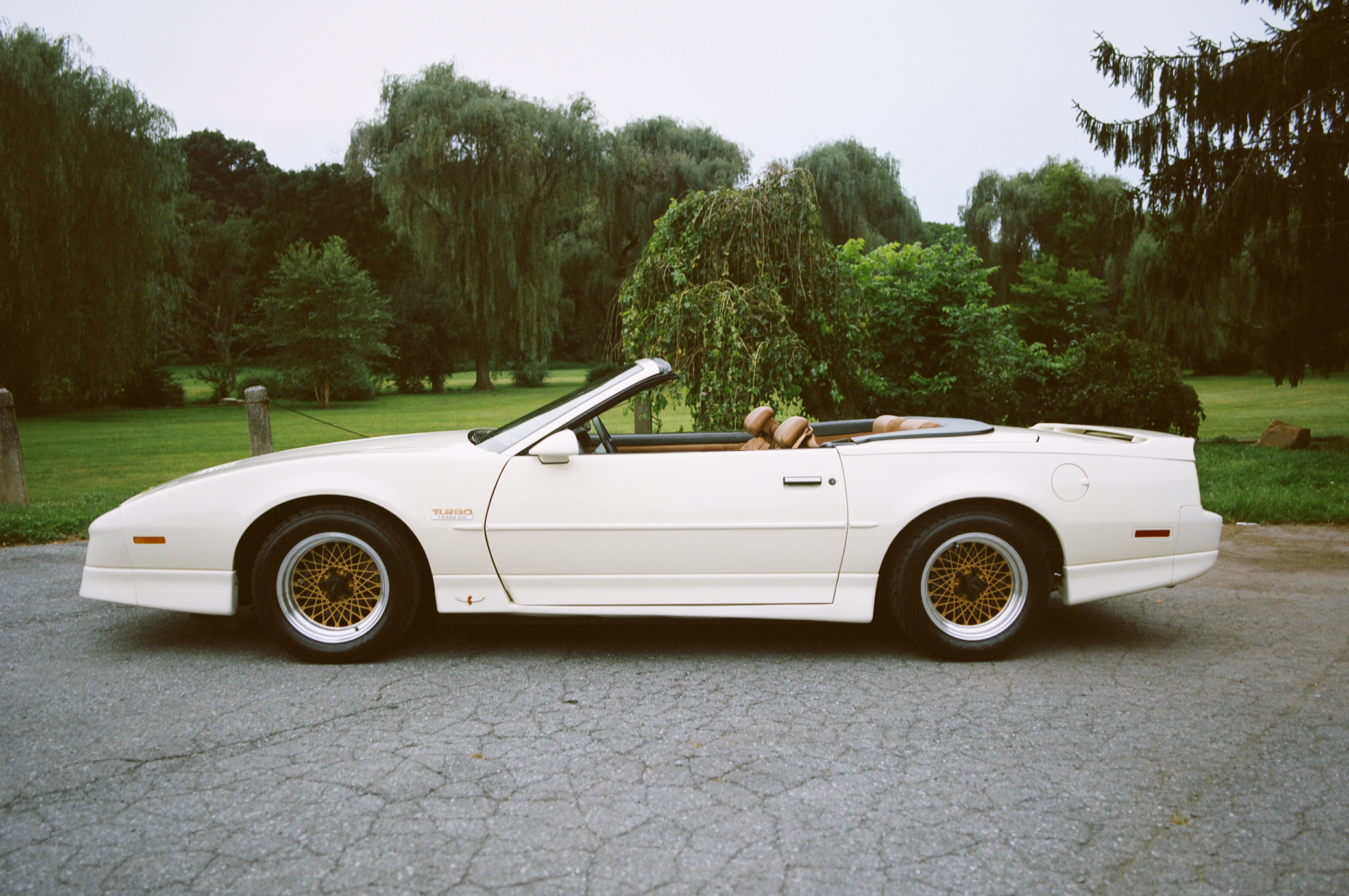
1989 20th Anniversary Turbo Trans Am Convertible (TTA). Pontiac Motor Division had this first TTA convertible built on spec by influencing a Pontiac dealer to order it. Two were reportedly built, one with Leather, one with cloth.

In 1989, Pontiac produced the quickest and fastest American production car. Pontiac was asked to provide a car to pace the 73rd running of the Indianapolis 500; it would be the final time a Pontiac would ever receive that honor. The Trans Am model was now 20 years old, and it was time for another anniversary edition, with this special 20th Anniversary Trans Am to be based on the existing Trans Am GTA. Through a partnership between Pontiac and an engineering firm called Prototype Automotive Services (PAS), the Trans Am GTA was equipped with a more powerful version of the turbocharged Buick 3.8 L V6, originally developed for the Buick Regal Grand National, and the Turbo Trans Am (TTA) became the vehicle Pontiac supplied to pace the Indianapolis 500. Ultimately, 1,555 TTA replicas, rated at 250 hp, were produced for sale, five of those being test cars. But after Car and Driver magazine tested the car, logging a 0–60 mph run in 4.6 seconds, a standing quarter-mile in 13.4 seconds at 101 mph, and a top speed of 153 MPH, they called the 250 hp rating "exceedingly modest," estimating the actual output to be "closer to 300 hp". They also subsequently reported that it was the "quickest 0–60 sprinter available in any US production-car showroom – at any price". The Car and Driver evaluation produced the best acceleration performance of any mainstream publication to test a regular TTA press car from the Pontiac fleet, partly because Car and Driver realized that the turbo boost must be "preloaded" to get maximum performance figures. But short-distance sprinting was not all this car could do well. Early in 1989, Motor Trend ran their top speed test article "Flat-out Fastest American Cars II-the Sequel". During this test, the TTA did 162 mph, and was the fastest production car evaluated in the test. However, Motor Trend declared the winner to be a 1989 Corvette ZR-1, which went much faster, but was not a production car (it was a prototype that Chevrolet intended to release for production in 1989, but did not come out until 1990). So by a slight technicality, the TTA could be called the flat-out quickest (0–60 4.6 sec.) and fastest (162 mph) American production car in 1989. When PAS installed a ZF 6-speed manual transmission into one of their modified High Output test cars (featuring different axle gearing, a modified engine with upgraded pistons and head gaskets which was tuned for much higher boost than stock, and running on 100-octane racing fuel), they were able to reach 181 mph. Perhaps more importantly than the performance tests provided by the industry magazines was that these cars were capable of much faster acceleration times – with minimal modifications. With $300 in new parts installed, 12.5-second quarter-mile runs were achievable – without manually shifting gears or the need to trailer the vehicle to the track. Because of this, the TTA has gained a cult following among amateur racing enthusiasts.

Pontiac sub-contracted the job of engineering the TTA engine modifications to PAS. The narrow engine bay of the Trans Am required the use of different cylinder heads, which happened to have better flow characteristics than the old Buick heads. Special stainless steel headers were made specifically for the project as well. The heads, headers, along with more refined tuning of the boost and fuel curves, all added up to a more powerful package than the older Buicks. PAS was also in charge of testing and assembling the engines. Most TTAs came with T-tops and leather interior, but there were also hardtops and cloth-interior cars. And every TTA had an automatic transmission – the TH200-4R, equipped with overdrive and a torque converter clutch. The three actual pace cars were randomly selected from the production run, and sent to Indianapolis to pace the race. Thus, the pace car replicas were closer to the actual pace cars than any replica previously offered; the only difference between the replicas and the three actual pace cars was the addition of strobe lights and safety equipment to the latter. In addition, the TTA was relatively economical to drive; it returned 24 mpg on the highway, while the only cars (besides the Lotus Esprit Turbo SE) that could approach its performance at the time (Ferraris, Lamborghinis, etc.) were far more costly, and providing only around 10 to 12 mpg. As has been proven to be the case in subsequent years, relying on a small engine for cruising, and a turbocharger for power, provides an exciting driving experience while returning impressive fuel mileage.

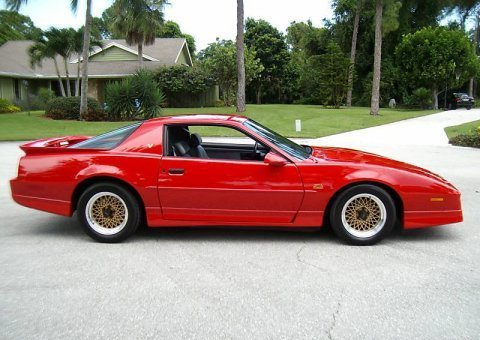
1989 Trans Am GTA

The rarest 20th Anniversary Turbo Trans Ams are the hardtops and convertibles. Only 40 hardtops were made. Only three convertible TTAs were built by ASC, one of which was bought by the president of PAS, with the other two falling into private hands. Only two are generally known to exist, however, as the ASC order log shows records for only two TTA convertibles. The five test TTAs, because they were for pre-production use, were pulled off of the assembly line without regard to color, and therefore were not necessarily white. At least two of these test cars were sold to private individuals, so there are at least two extremely rare, non-white, factory TTAs in existence; in fact, one is known to be red.

As for the rest of the Firebird line, GM made a new dual catalytic converter exhaust system (RPO code N10) available, freeing up 13% more power from some LB9- and L98-equipped Formulas and Trans Ams; so equipped, LB9 engine output was increased to 225 hp while the L98 increased to 235 hp. The N10 option remained available throughout the balance of the Third Generation production run, however the L98 powerplant was only available with an automatic transmission, whereas the LB9/N10 combination could only be coupled to a 5-speed manual (RPO code MM5) and a limited-slip differential (RPO code G80) using a 3.45 performance axle ratio (RPO code GM3). According to a March 1990 (Vol. 35, No. 9) Car and Driver article, when the latter set of options were combined into the relatively unassuming (and 300-pounds-lighter) Formula body, which shared the same WS6 suspension with the top-end Trans Am GTA, it created a "sleeper" Firebird that could out-perform the heavier Trans Am GTA (even when equipped with the L98 engine) – at a roughly 30% lower sticker price. Car and Driver also reported that (aside from the TTA, offered only in 1989) these "sleeper" Formulas were the fastest third-generation Firebirds – capable of accelerating from 0–60 mph in under 7 seconds and boasting a top speed of more than 135 mph (217 km/h) (quite impressive for the day). Although not an exhaustive comparison, these claims would seem to be supported by a simple examination of the weight-to-power ratios of both models: a 225 hp Formula at a curb weight of 3,300 lb (1,497 kg) versus a 235 hp Trans Am GTA at a curb weight of 3,600 lb (1,633 kg); the weight-to-power ratio for the Formula is 14.67 lb/hp compared to 15.32 lb/hp for the Trans Am GTA. According to the same Car and Driver article, very few of these "sleeper" Formulas hit the streets; only about 50 were built each model year, as almost all LB9-equipped Formulas came with an automatic transmission – which disqualified them from receiving the high-performance N10 and GM3 options.

Firebirds optioned with T-tops received new acrylic plastic tops made by Leximar for GM. The new tops were lighter in weight and tinted darker, but were more dome shaped and aged rapidly. GM replaced many sets with tops made of glass under warranty, but the acrylic tops continued as standard-issue through 1992. All Firebirds optioned with rear disc brakes now received PBR brake calipers and larger brake rotors, which resolved issues encountered with previous-model rear discs and increased stopping power. Introduction of GM's Vehicle Anti Theft System (VATS) or PASS-Key made all Firebirds more theft-resistant. The system was adapted from GM's higher-end Corvette and Cadillac vehicles in response to an escalating trend among car thieves to target the Camaro and Firebird. VATS incorporated a small resistor into the ignition key shaft which was read by a sensor when the key was inserted. VATS-equipped cars also displayed anti-theft system warning decals in the lower rear corners of the side windows. A new CD player was offered, shoulder belts were added in the back seat, and the convertible model carried over.

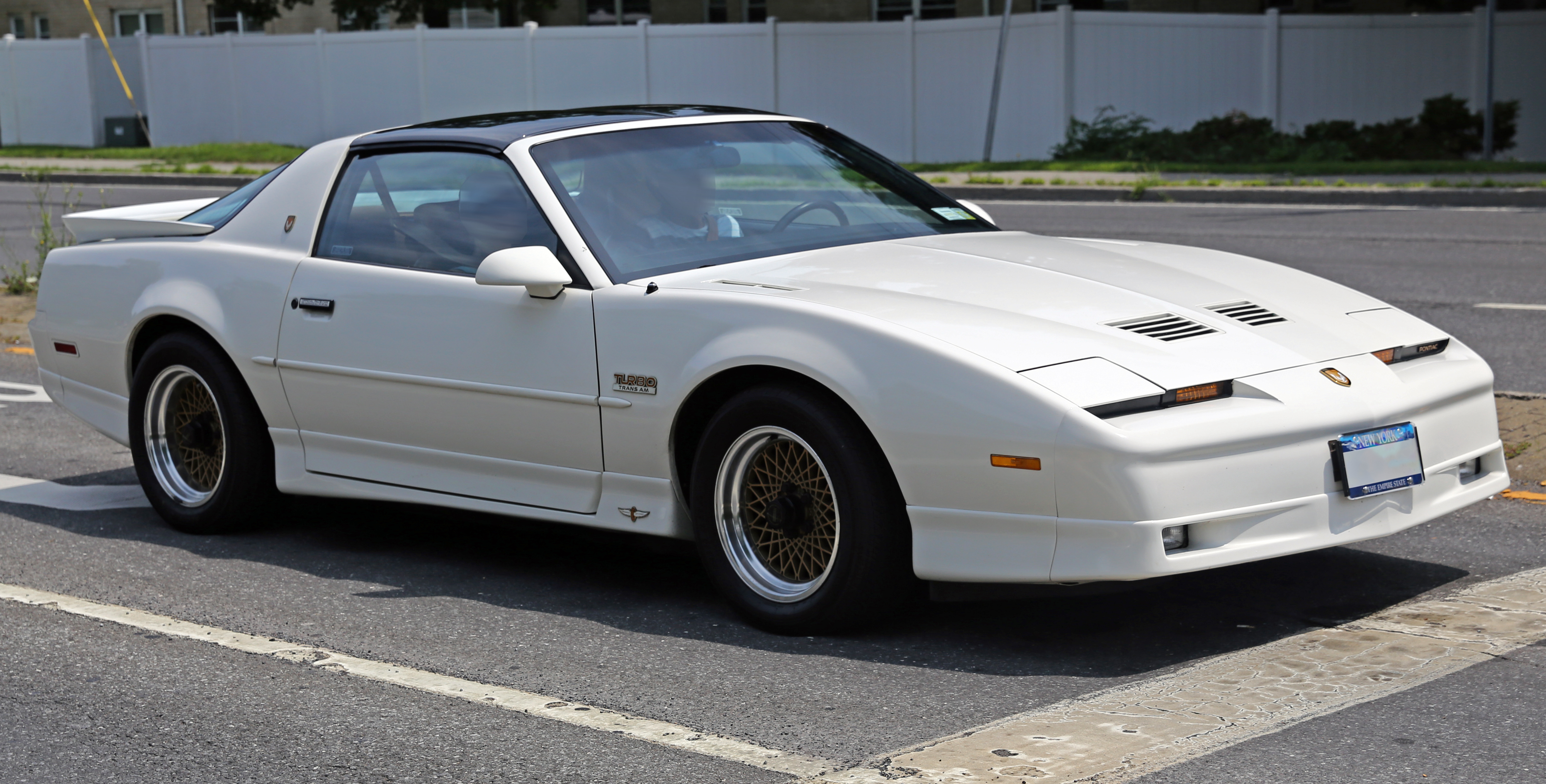
1989 20th Anniversary Turbo Trans Am (TTA)

TTA production figures:

- 1,323 T-Top & Leather Interior
- 187 T-Top & Cloth Interior
- 24 Hardtop & Leather Interior
- 15 Hardtop & Cloth Interior (Base)
- 3 Test Cars / T-Top & Cloth Interior
- 1 ASC Convertible Leather int
- 1 Test Car / ASC Convertible Cloth int
- 1 Test Car / Hardtop & Leather Interior

ASC continued to make Convertibles for Pontiac dealerships. A total of 330 Convertibles were reported by ASC. A portion of those were 350 powered Convertibles. NOTE: 1989 was the First year a US Dealership could order T-top and a 350 Engine in a firebird. Since all Convertibles started as a CC1 (T-Top) car and converted by ASC 1989 would also be the only year to get a 350 powered third generation Firebird convertible.

1989 Firebird Convertible production figures From 1989 ASC order logs

- 2 – TURBO TRANS AM (V6 Turbo)
- 158 – GTA or Trans Am -w/L98 (350 TPI)
- 43 – FORMULA 350 – w/L98 (350 TPI)
- 9 – GTA or Trans Am LB9 "F" (305 TPI)
- 18 – FORMULA – W/LB9 (305 TPI)
- 4 – Trans Am LO3 "E" (305 TBI)
- 56 – Firebird or Formula – W/LO3 (305 TBI)
- 36 – Firebird – W/LB8 (2.8L V6)
- 4 - Not Listed in Dealer Order Logs

– - – ASC Reported a total of 330 Firebird Convertibles in 1989

Information comes from 1989 ASC Order log, the Order log show only 324 of the reported 330 convertibles, as of May 2022, two of those missing 6 vehicles have been identified and added to the above data. As a side note there are a known 5 L98 Powered Camaros made in 1987, making the total number of L98 Powered Firebird and Camaro Convertibles produced some of the rarest and sought after third Gens made with a total of around 204 produced for both lines all years combined.

== 1990 ==
A driver-side airbag was made standard. The Firebird interior again received a redesign, this time the changes were much less drastic: the lower dash and under-dash panels were altered, and accessory switches were moved to a new panel above the heater and radio controls. The deluxe contoured interior door panels that were standard in GTAs and available in Trans Ams were no longer available. All models would have to make do with the rather crude, flat, carpeted door panels, although if leather seats were ordered, genuine perforated leather was added above the armrest on the basic door panels. In GTAs the cheap door panels looked very out of place next to the exotic looking articulating seats. The console got a new shift indicator. This time, there was actually a needle to indicate what gear you had selected. Previously, you just had to line up the shifter handle with the markings. Steering wheel-mounted radio controls disappeared from the GTA (due to the addition of the airbag), and the L98 engine was no longer offered in the T-top cars due to fuel economy regulations. The LB9 and L98 platforms were updated with new speed density fuel injection, and the elimination of the MAF sensor reduced production costs and supposedly improved performance. All L98-equipped cars now received the N10 dual catalytic converters as standard, which technically was a mid year change for 1989.

Like the Camaro, the 1990 Firebird only received a half-year production run, as Pontiac labored to release the restyled 1991 model. Production ceased on December 31, 1989.

ASC reported making no Firebird Convertibles for 1990.

== 1991 ==
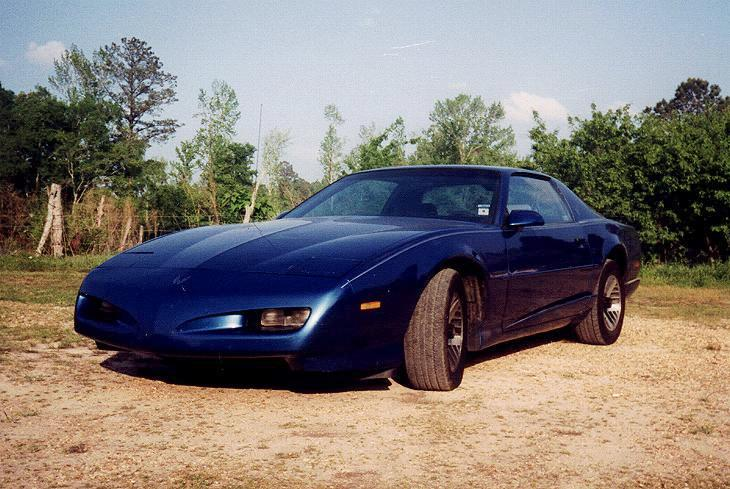
1991 Firebird with restyled nose.

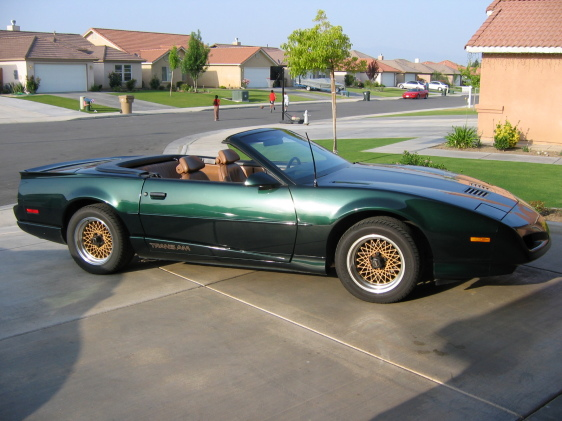
Trans Am Convertible's with Camel leather had GTA wheels and seats standard. There were no GTA convertibles from 1991 on.

For the 1991 model year, all Firebirds received restyled noses loosely fashioned after the "Banshee IV" show car while Pontiac was developing the all-new fourth-generation platform. The Trans Am's ground effects were re-styled as well, and were made available as an appearance package on the base model Firebird, but unavailable on the Formula. The Trans Am and Formula received a new fiberglass-constructed, flat, wrap-around wing, The Trans Am and GTA received updated two-piece tail lights with "PONTIAC" scripted in orange across the panels, and the center, high-mounted stop lamps were moved to inside the top edge of the rear hatch.

The Formula was the only third-generation F-body to get to T-tops with a 350 cubic inch engine starting in MID year 1991 & 1992, to get a FORMULA 350 T-top car the black cross laced wheels (as installed on the Trans AM) were mandatory.

Due to its lighter weight and improved aerodynamics the Firebird Convertible was finally available through GM's normal ordering procedures. ASC still converted T-top cars into convertibles but the ordering process was simplified and dealers would no longer need to have the cars drop shipped to ASC in Michigan. The Convertibles were offered with one of three engine options: LHO 3.1L V6, the L03 5.0L V8 for the base Firebird, or the LB9 5.0L V8 Trans Am only.

An improvement on the T-top cars was introduced mid year on all F-bodies. T-top cars now came with new seals which greatly reduced leaks into the passenger compartment.

Beginning in 1991, SLP (Street Legal Performance) modified a factory-built Formula into what they called the "Firehawk". Once a Formula had been ordered or purchased, this limited-availability option (RPO code B4U) could be specified, and the vehicle was sent to SLP to be modified. No two cars SLP produced were alike; they all were special orders. SLP had anticipated making 250 of these special Firebird Formulas, but in fact, only 27 were ordered; and of those, only 25 were ever built (numbered 1–25 for hardtops – with numbers 18 and 23 never being built – and the only Firehawk Convertible was numbered 27 which was the only non-formula). Of those 25 Firehawks, 21 were "Mandatory" Red, 1 Aqua, 1 White, 1 Blue, and 1 Green; 11 had the Competition Package, 3 came with aluminum engine blocks, 1 had T-Tops, and 1 was a convertible.

FIREHAWK SPECIFICATIONS

Standard Features: $39,995

- SLP modified 350 engine rated at 350 hp at 5,500 rpm and 390 lb⋅ft (530 N⋅m) at 4,400 rpm
- 17 X 9.5-inch Ronal alloy wheels with Firestone Firehawk SZ P275/40/ZR17 tires
- ZF 6-speed manual transmission with carbon fiber clutch
- Stainless Steel catalytic converter and exhaust system
- A Dana 44 rear axle with 3.54:1 Posi-gears
- Special Firehawk badging, decals and numbered plaque

Competition Package: $9,995

- Cross-drilled 13-inch Brembo Ferrari F-40 brakes
- Full roll cage minus the back seat
- Aluminum hood
- Recaro racing seats with full harnesses by Simpson and rear seat delete.

Engine:

- 4-bolt main engine block
- Forged steel crankshaft
- 1053 alloy, forged steel "Pink" connecting rods
- Light-weight, high-silicon, cast aluminum pistons
- Steel billet hydraulic roller camshaft
- High-output aluminum cylinder heads with stainless steel valves
- Port-injection intake manifold designed by Ray Falconer

Performance:(according to SLP brochure)

- Weight-to-power ratio: 9.7 lb per hp
- Acceleration (0 to 60 mph): 4.6 seconds
- Quarter mile: 13.2 seconds at 107 mph (172 km/h)
- Top speed: 160 mph (260 km/h)
- Skid pad: 0.88g on full tread

Motor Trend test results:

- Acceleration (0 to 60 mph): 4.9 seconds
- Quarter mile: 13.4 seconds at 105 mph (169 km/h)
- Braking 60–0: 135 ft (41 m).
- Skid pad: 0.94g
- Slalom: 68.3 mph (109.9 km/h)

== 1992 ==
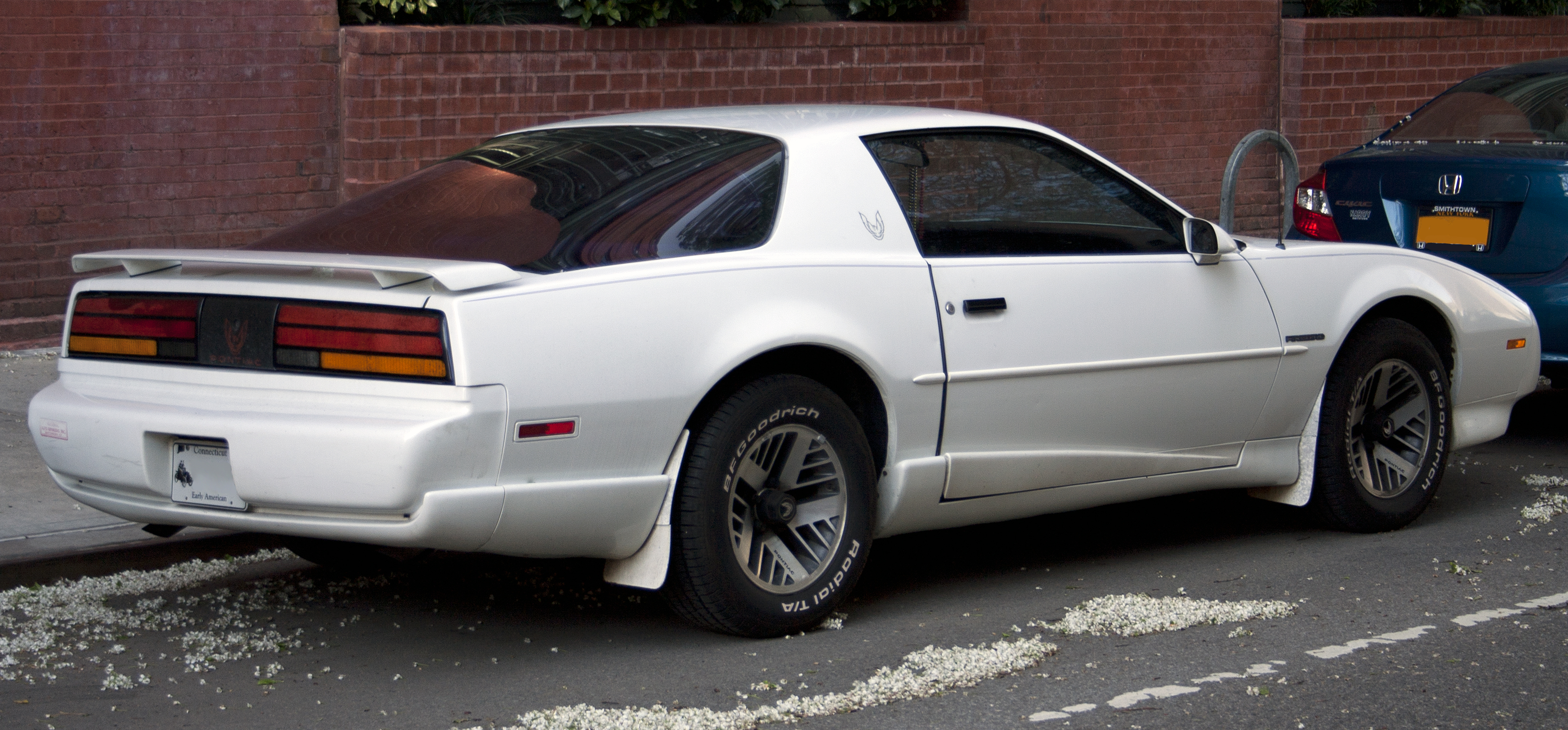
1992 Base-model Firebird (V6)

This marked the final production year for the Third Generation platform. Release of the Fourth Generation model was imminent, and Pontiac made few changes to the 1992 Firebird. The special edition Formula Firehawk that appeared in 1991 was still available, although a lot of dealers were unaware of its existence. The lack of awareness and a sky high price tag conspired to keep the sales figures down on the special Firehawk. As for the rest of the line, new exterior colors were available, including a bright "Jamaica Yellow". One interior color was changed, from the camel colored beechwood to a greyish beige. Convertibles were still available. One improvement made on all 1992 F-bodies was the addition of some extra bonding agents to stiffen the structure of the cars. The extra bonding was an attempt to correct squeaks and rattles that some owners had complained about. This also allowed GM to experiment with some of the new technologies which were to be implemented on the fourth generation cars.

Mid-year, TPI-equipped cars only received blank throttle body plates rather than ones that had been marked "TUNED PORT INJECTION" on similar engines in prior model years; and black-painted valve covers replaced the silver components from previous years. As use of the L98 in the Corvette had come to an end, rough-cast runners found their way into L98-equipped Firebirds, and some cars received special rubber snubbers on the rear hatch frame that were designed to make the hatch more stable. This would be the last year for the light weight deep dish cross-laced wheels that had been available since 1987, and had been styled to look like expensive aftermarket rims. It would be the last year for the GTA, the last year for concealed windshield wipers, and the last year for the aerodynamic body with the long hood and low roofline. It was also the last year for full leather covering on the front seats. Some GTA's ended up with drum brakes on the rear, presumably because of a shortage of disc brake parts. Buyers were compensated for the downgrade. Ultimately, very few Trans Ams, GTA's, and Formulas were produced in this model year, as most buyers were waiting for the next-generation models.

GTA production figures:

- United States: 226
- Canada: 48

== Engines ==
Year	Inline-4	V6	V8			V6 Turbo
1982	151 cu in (2.5 L) Pontiac; Throttle Body Injection I4	173 cu in (2.8 L) "X" 2-barrel V6	305 cu in (5.0 L) Chevrolet 4-barrel V8	305 cu in (5.0 L) Chevrolet Cross-Fire Injection V8 (first year for fuel injection in Trans Am)		
1983	151 cu in (2.5 L) Pontiac; Throttle Body Injection I4	173 cu in (2.8 L) "X" 2-barrel V6	305 cu in (5.0 L) Chevrolet 4-barrel V8	305 cu in (5.0 L) Chevrolet Cross-Fire Injection V8 (first year for fuel injection in Trans Am)	305 cu in (5.0 L) Chevrolet 4-barrel H.O. V8 (only 662 made, all five-speed manuals)	
1984	151 cu in (2.5 L) Pontiac; Throttle Body Injection I4	173 cu in (2.8 L) "X" 2-barrel V6	305 cu in (5.0 L) Chevrolet 4-barrel V8		305 cu in (5.0 L) Chevrolet 4-barrel H.O. V8	
1985	151 cu in (2.5 L) Pontiac; Throttle Body Injection I4	173 cu in (2.8 L) "X" Multi-Port Fuel Injection V6	305 cu in (5.0 L) Chevrolet 4-barrel V8	305 cu in (5.0 L) Tuned Port Injection V8	305 cu in (5.0 L) Chevrolet 4-barrel H.O. V8 (5-speed only)	
1986		173 cu in (2.8 L) "X" Multi-Port Fuel Injection V6	305 cu in (5.0 L) Chevrolet 4-barrel V8	305 cu in (5.0 L) Tuned Port Injection V8	305 cu in (5.0 L) Chevrolet 4-barrel H.O. V8 (5-speed only)	
1987		173 cu in (2.8 L) "X" Multi-Port Fuel Injection V6	305 cu in (5.0 L) Chevrolet 4-barrel V8	305 cu in (5.0 L) Tuned Port Injection V8	350 cu in (5.7 L) Chevrolet Tuned Port Injection V8 (automatic only)	
1988		173 cu in (2.8 L) "X" Multi-Port Fuel Injection V6	305 cu in (5.0 L) Throttle Body Injection V8	305 cu in (5.0 L) Tuned Port Injection V8	350 cu in (5.7 L) Chevrolet Tuned Port Injection V8 (automatic only)	
1989		173 cu in (2.8 L) "X" Multi-Port Fuel Injection V6	305 cu in (5.0 L) Throttle Body Injection V8	305 cu in (5.0 L) Tuned Port Injection V8	350 cu in (5.7 L) Chevrolet Tuned Port Injection V8 (automatic only)	231 cu in (3.8 L) Buick Turbo; Sequential Port Fuel Injection V6
1990		191 cu in (3.1 L) "X" Multi-port Fuel Injection V6	305 cu in (5.0 L) Throttle Body Injection V8	305 cu in (5.0 L) Tuned Port Injection V8	350 cu in (5.7 L) Chevrolet Tuned Port Injection V8 (automatic only)	
1991		191 cu in (3.1 L) "X" Multi-port Fuel Injection V6	305 cu in (5.0 L) Throttle Body Injection V8	305 cu in (5.0 L) Tuned Port Injection V8	350 cu in (5.7 L) Chevrolet Tuned Port Injection V8 (automatic only)	
1992		191 cu in (3.1 L) "X" Multi-port Fuel Injection V6	305 cu in (5.0 L) Throttle Body Injection V8	305 cu in (5.0 L) Tuned Port Injection V8	350 cu in (5.7 L) Chevrolet Tuned Port Injection V8 (automatic only)	

== Bibliography ==
- Gunnell, John (1992), Illustrated Firebird Buyer's Guide (2nd ed.), Iola, WI: Motorbooks International, ISBN 978-0879386535
