= Robert M. Montague Jr. =

United States Army officer (1924–1996)

Robert Miller Montague Jr.
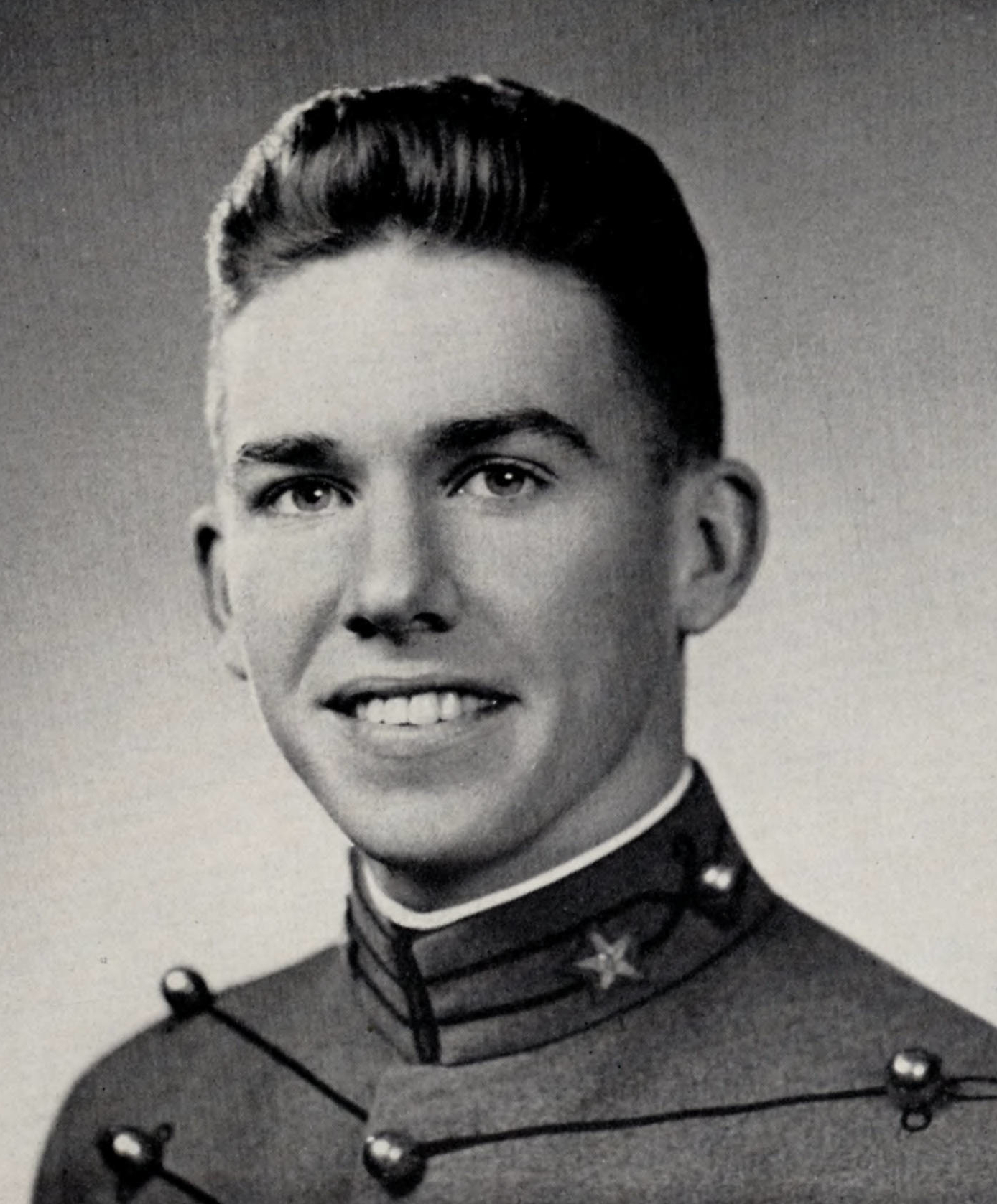
- Montague at West Point, c. 1947
- Born: October 22, 1924; Hawaii, US
- Died: October 11, 1996 (aged 71); Washington, D.C., US
- Burial place: Arlington National Cemetery
- Military career
- Branch: United States Army
- Service years: 1947–1974
- Rank: Brigadier general
- Unit: Field Artillery Branch
- Commands: Army Recruiting Command (United States)
- Conflicts: Vietnam War

Robert Miller Montague Jr. (October 22, 1924 – October 11, 1996) was an American brigadier general. He was also the Special Assistant to the Assistant Secretary of Defense for All-Volunteer Force Action. Montague was one of the earliest strategists of the Vietnam War.

== Biography ==
Gen. Montague was born in Hawaii on October 22, 1924. He was the son of Robert Miller Montague, a Commander of the U.S. Caribbean Command. His formative years were spent in a number of peacetime Army posts. These included the time he stayed at Forth Leavenworth, where he completed his primary education and junior high school. He then completed his high school at Woodrow Wilson High School in 1942. Before he was accepted to the United States Military Academy at West Point, New York, he was already in his second year at Purdue University. He was admitted to the academy as a Qualified Alternate from Louisville, Kentucky. He graduated top of the Class of 1947.

In the 1950s, Montague worked for the Defense Department and Atomic Energy Commission during these agencies' development of nuclear warheads. He continued working for the Department of Defense during the tenure of Secretary Robert McNamara. He established the first systems-analysis office at the Department of Army headquarters.

When he was a colonel, Montague became part of Ambassador Robert W. Komer's personal staff during the latter's administration of the Civil Operations and Revolutionary Development Support (CORDS) program in Vietnam. He became an aide to Komer both in the White House and Saigon. In November 1970, he joined the Special Assistant for the Modern Volunteer Army (SAMVA), where he was noted for his innovations in all-volunteer concept work. Prior to 1970, he was the commander of the 5th Infantry Division Artillery at Fort Carson, Colorado. He retired from service in 1974.

=== Retirement ===
After retirement, Montague founded R.M. Montague and Associates. He also became the executive director of Special Olympics International, which oversaw a $150 million sports program for intellectually disabled persons. He had also worked as head of the Joseph P. Kennedy Jr. Foundation.

== Personal life ==
Montague was married to Christa Montague. He and his first wife, Margaret Crowell, had three children, David, John, and Jeanie. He died of cancer on October 11, 1996, aged 71, at Walter Reed Army Medical Center.
