= Robert M. Montague =

United States Army general (1899–1958)

Robert Miller Montague
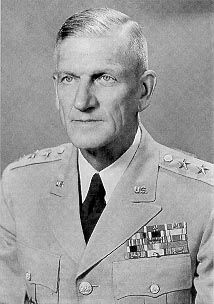
- Montague as commander of the Sandia Missile Base
- Born: 7 August 1899; Portland, Oregon, US
- Died: 20 February 1958 (aged 58); Balboa, Panama
- Burial place: Arlington National Cemetery
- Military career
- Allegiance: United States
- Branch: United States Army
- Service years: 1918–1958
- Rank: Lieutenant general
- Service number: 0-12261
- Unit: Field Artillery Branch
- Commands: 83rd Infantry Division Artillery; 83rd Infantry Division; Sandia Missile Base; I Corps; U.S. Caribbean Command
- Conflicts: World War I World War II
- Awards: Army Distinguished Service Medal; Legion of Merit; Bronze Star

Robert Miller Montague (7 August 1899 – 20 February 1958) was a lieutenant general in the United States Army. He achieved prominence as the deputy commander of Fort Bliss, Texas, commander of the Sandia Missile Base in New Mexico and head of the U.S. Caribbean Command.

== Early life ==
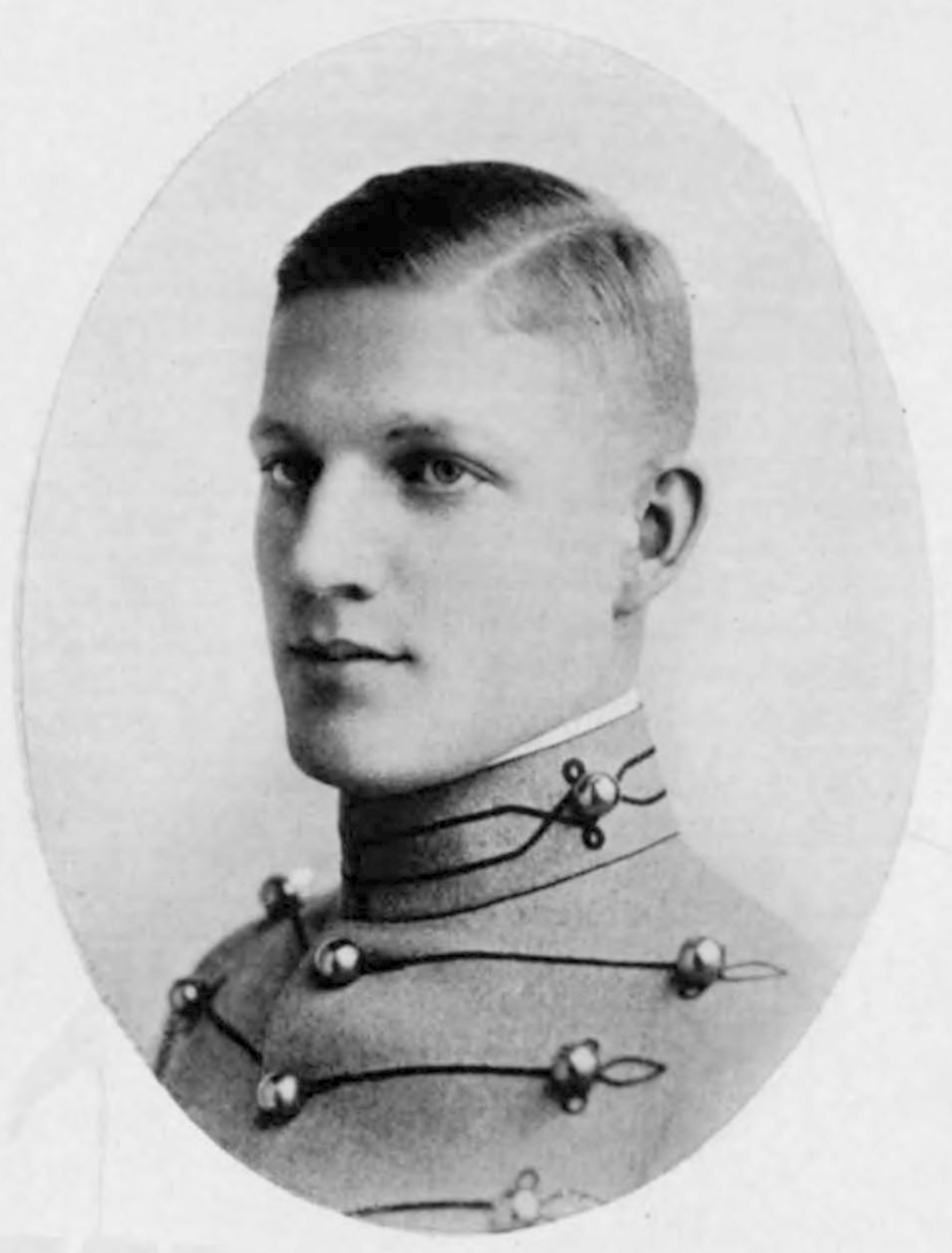
As a West Point cadet

Montague was born in Portland, Oregon, on 7 August 1899. He attended the University of Oregon and then transferred to the United States Military Academy at West Point, from which he graduated in 1918 with a commission as a second lieutenant of artillery.

== World War I ==
Having graduated in November during a wartime expansion of the West Point student body, Montague began his career too late for active combat in World War I. As many other students from his class did, Montague carried out a European observation tour for most of 1919, enhancing his professional knowledge by visiting battlefields in France, Belgium, and Germany, compiling after action reports, and interviewing battlefield veterans.

== Post World War I ==
Montague completed the Field Artillery Basic Course in 1920.

He then carried out numerous assignments throughout the United States, including serving as an instructor at the United States Military Academy in the 1930s.

In 1933 Montague graduated from the Field Artillery Advanced Course.

Montague completed the Command and General Staff College in 1938.

== World War II ==
From 1944 to 1945 Montague was commander of the 83rd Infantry Division Artillery in the European Theater of Operations. He also served as acting division commander on several occasions.

== Post World War II ==
From 1945 to 1947 Montague served as deputy commander of the Army's Air Defense Artillery Center at Fort Bliss, Texas.

From 1947 to 1951 Montague was the commander of the Sandia Missile Base near Albuquerque, New Mexico.

Montague served as the head of plans, operations and training, G-3, for the United States European Command from 1951 to 1952.

From 1952 to 1955 Montague was assigned as deputy commander of Army Field Forces, based at Fort Monroe, Virginia.

Montague commanded the U.S. I Corps in South Korea from 1955 to 1957.

== UFOlogy ==
Montague's name appears in some UFO conspiracy theories such as Majestic 12.

== Commander, U.S. Caribbean Command ==
In 1957 Montague was appointed to command the U.S. Caribbean Defense Command, the post he was still serving in when he died.

== Death ==
General Montague was stricken with an intestinal illness in January 1958 after traveling extensively in South America. He did not recover, and died on February 20 from a cerebral hemorrhage at Gorgas Hospital, Balboa, Panama Canal Zone.

Robert M. Montague is buried at Arlington National Cemetery, Section 30, Site 533 RH.

== Awards and decorations ==
General Montague received the Distinguished Service Medal, the Legion of Merit and two awards of the Bronze Star.

== Memorials ==
Montague Road at Fort Sill is named for him as is Montague Loop at Fort Bliss.

== Personal ==
Robert Miller Montague was the father of Brigadier General Robert M. Montague Jr., (22 October 1924 – 15 October 1996), who graduated from West Point in 1947 and was one of the early U.S. strategists of the Vietnam War. After retiring from the Army the younger Montague served as executive director of the Joseph P. Kennedy Jr. Foundation and the Special Olympics.
