= Eddie McClintock =

American actor (born 1967)

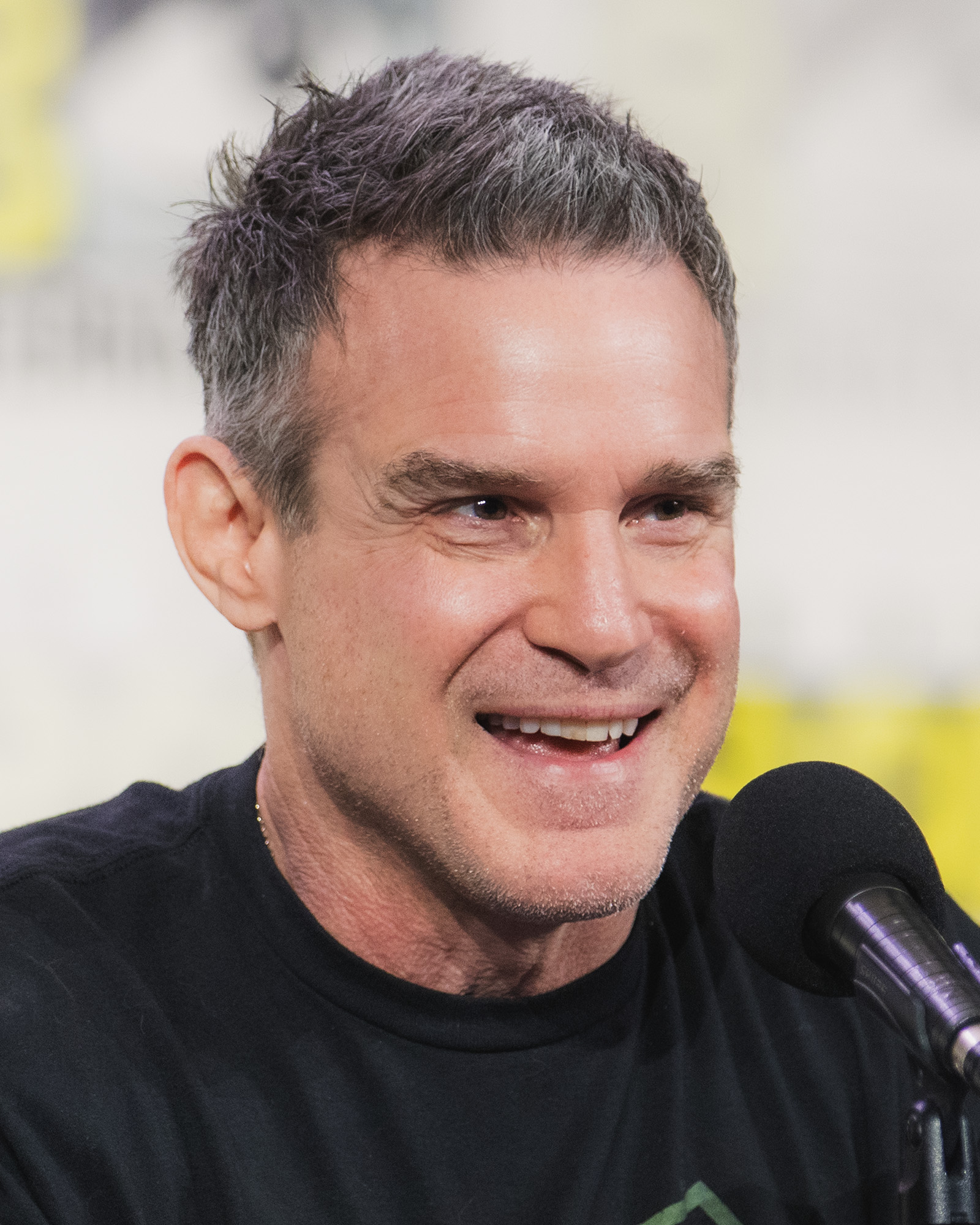
- McClintock at the 2026 San Diego Comic-Con
- Born: Edward Theodore McClintock; May 27, 1967 (age 59); Canton, Ohio, U.S.
- Occupation: Actor
- Years active: 1997–present
- Spouse: Lynn Sanchez (m. 2005)
- Children: 2

Edward Theodore McClintock (born May 27, 1967) is an American actor. He is best known for his role of Secret Service agent Pete Lattimer on the Syfy series Warehouse 13. McClintock's other television roles include the sitcom Stark Raving Mad and the action thriller Shooter. In 2023, he made his film directorial debut with Miracle at Manchester, in which he also starred.

== Early life ==
Edward Theodore McClintock was born on May 27, 1967, in North Canton, Ohio, to Susan and Ted McClintock. After leaving St. Michael's Catholic School in the eighth grade, he attended North Canton Hoover High School, graduating in 1985, where he played football and wrestled.

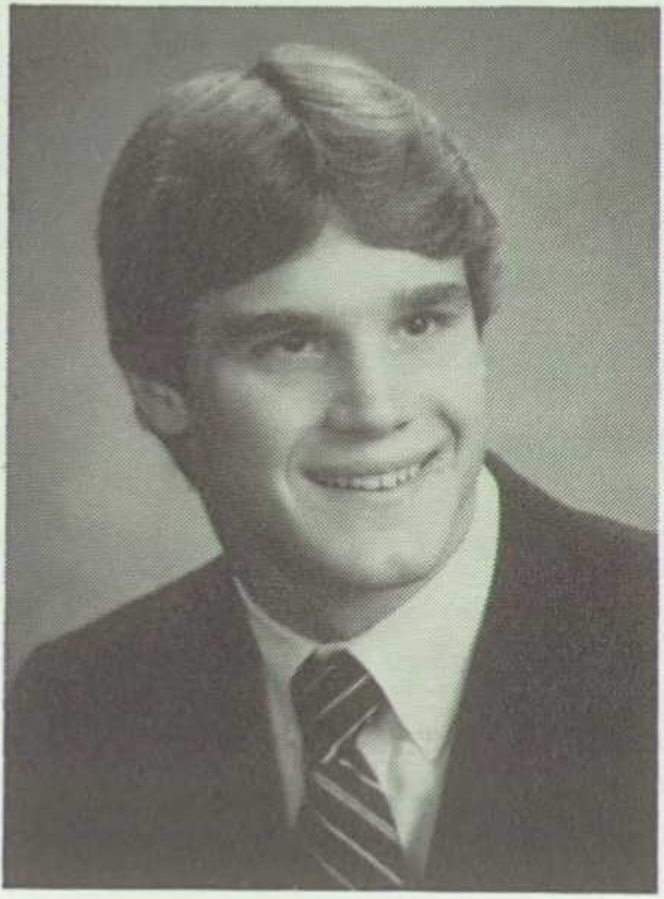
McClintock's Hoover High School senior portrait

McClintock graduated in 1991 with a degree in communication studies from Wright State University in Dayton, where he wrestled for three seasons. After college, he moved to Los Angeles, worked briefly in corporate insurance for an uncle, and then spent several years as a production assistant before beginning acting classes.

== Career ==
McClintock began working regularly in television in the late 1990s, booking guest spots before moving into series-regular roles. One of his earliest starring turns came with the NBC sitcom Stark Raving Mad (1999–2000), which won the 2000 People's Choice Award for Favorite New Television Comedy Series but was canceled after one season.

Throughout the 2000s he alternated between regular or recurring parts and a steady stream of guest appearances on series such as Friends, Sex and the City, Felicity, and The King of Queens. Notable recurring characters included Frank Helm on Desperate Housewives (2006). and Special Agent Tim Sullivan on Bones (2007) During the same period he pursued visual art, designing the cover for Puscifer's album "V" Is for Vagina. By 2009, he had appeared as a lead in five short-lived shows and filmed ten network pilots. Only the tenth would be ordered to series.

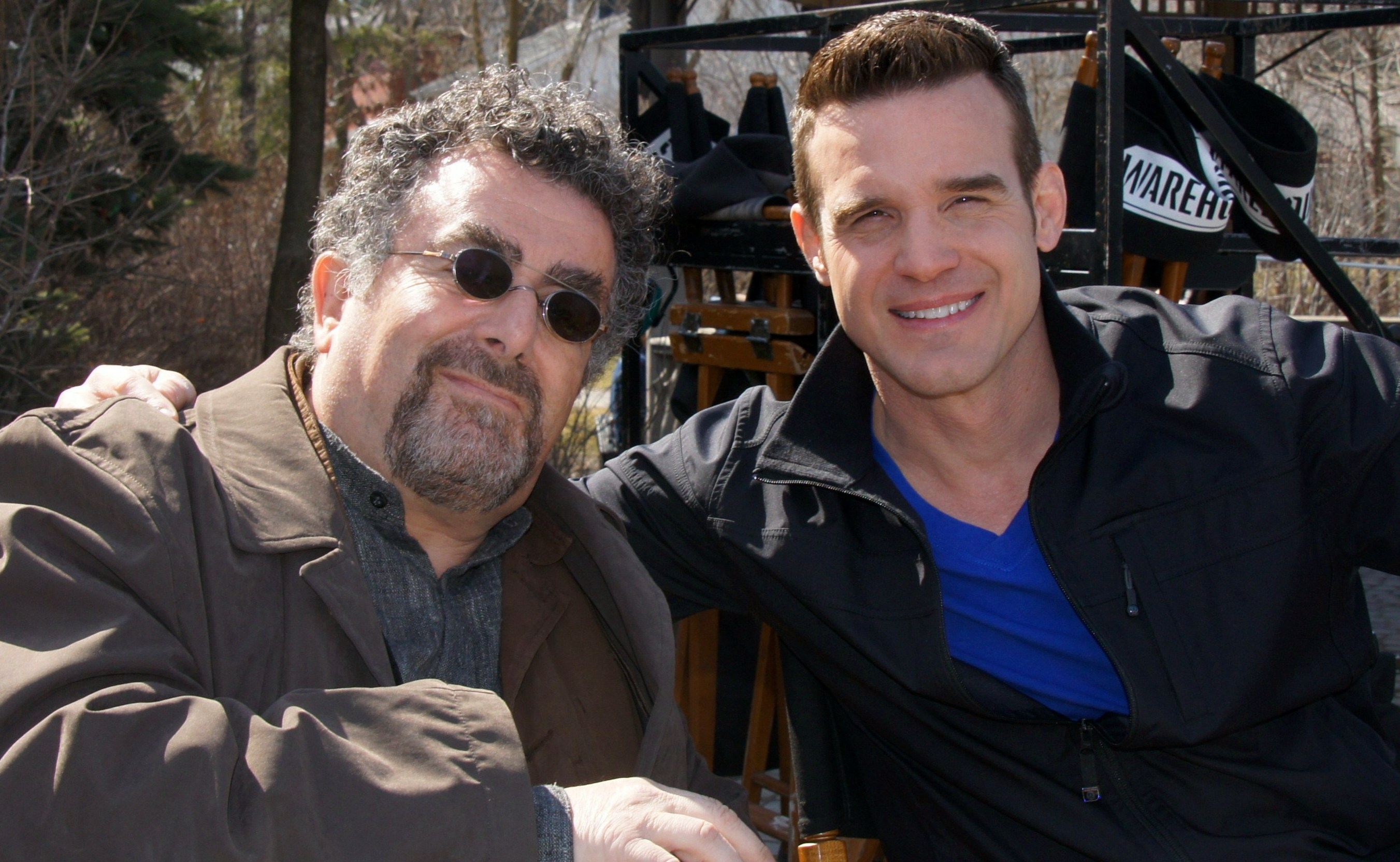
McClintock with his Warehouse 13 costar Saul Rubinek

McClintock achieved his widest recognition in 2009 when he was cast as Secret Service agent Pete Lattimer on the Syfy series Warehouse 13. His performance on the show was noted for a "goofy charm" that made the character likable. The Los Angeles Times highlighted the series' "flirty fun" tone and credited McClintock's "rugged good looks and crooked smile" with helping to draw record Syfy viewership. McClintock has said he helped shape Pete's backstory by making the character a recovering alcoholic, reflecting his own sobriety and adding depth beneath the humor.

After that series concluded in 2014, McClintock joined the cast of the USA Network thriller Shooter in 2016 as former Marine Jack Payne. He also had a role as the absentee father, Rob, on the Disney+ series The Mighty Ducks: Game Changers (2021). In 2019, McClintock had a recurring role as Tony Franzelli, the jailed father of the title character, in the Netflix comedy No Good Nick.

Since 2020, McClintock has appeared in numerous independent, faith-based, and direct-to-video films. In 2023, McClintock made his feature directing debut with the family drama film Miracle at Manchester, in which he portrayed the father of a teenager diagnosed with an aggressive brain tumor. In early 2024, McClintock returned to his hometown in Ohio to begin work on a semi-autobiographical film titled Takedown, based on his high school wrestling years and struggles with family issues, which he wrote and directed.

== Personal life ==
McClintock married Lynn Sanchez in 2005, and the couple have two sons. He has often spoken of his father Ted as his hero and role model, crediting him for raising him as a single parent and never giving up on him. McClintock's father died in 2022, before the filming of Miracle at Manchester. McClintock dedicated that film to his father's memory, saying his dad was "in every frame of this film."

McClintock has been open about overcoming struggles with alcohol and drug use. In his early thirties, after years of hard partying, he realized "I had taken it too far" and grew tired of constantly apologizing to family and friends. With the support of his sister and parents, he got sober in the early 2000s and refocused on his acting career. During a later period when acting work was scarce, McClintock even applied to join the Los Angeles Police Department as a way to "be of service" to the community and provide for his family, though he ultimately did not become a police officer.

== Filmography ==
=== Film ===
Year	Title	Role	Notes
1999	Mumford	Unsolved Mumford	
2000	Screenland Drive	Clay	
2002	Moving August	August Loder	
2002	The Sweetest Thing	Michael	
2002	Full Frontal	Second fired employee	
2009	Pet Peeves (short)	Jack	
2013	A Fish Story	Eddie	
2020	Reboot Camp	Cooper Johnson	
2021	Just Swipe	Astor	
2021	Chosen	Edwin Miller	
2022	Drop the Beat	Wayne	
2022	Glass Walls	Billy	
2022	Joey & Rex Save the Church	Darren Moore	
2022	The Curse of Wolf Mountain	Ric	
2023	Miracle at Manchester	Richard Newman	Also directed
2023	Starstruck	Scott Beck	
2023	A Taste of Praise	Danny Mincott	
2023	Casting Stones	Pastor Thomas	
2023	Bumbling Ballerina	Carson	
2023	The Twitter Files	Marc Walker	
2023	I Want to Jump	Randy Paulsen	
2024	Takedown	Jason Fawcett	Also director, writer
2024	We Believe	Jodi Mote	
2024	The Ribbon	Store Manager / Graduation Speaker	
2024	Cancel Me Not	Chase Murray	
2024	Best Supporting Actors	Tyler Tate	
2024	John Brown: The Advocate	Charles Byrne	
2024	Conceivable	Joe	
2024	Karma: Death at Latigo Springs	Dallas Jones	
TBA	Concert Heroes		

=== Television ===
Television
Year	Title	Role	Notes
1997	Ned & Stacey	Chazz Gordon	2 episodes
1997	Diagnosis: Murder	Young "Manny" Tubbs	Episode: "A History of Murder"
1998	Holding the Baby	Jimmy Stiles	Main cast
1999, 2001	Felicity	Ryan Crane	2 episodes
1999	Zoe, Duncan, Jack, and Jane	Vince	Episode: "The Advice"
1999–2000	Stark Raving Mad	Jake Donovan	Main cast
2000	Sex and the City	Guy by pool (uncredited)	Episode: "Escape from New York"
2000	Just Shoot Me!	Slam	Episode: "The First Thanksgiving"
2000	Spin City	Robert	Episode: "All the Wrong Moves"
2002	Glory Days	Leo Cochran	Episode: "The Lost Girls"
2002	Friends	Clifford "Cliff" Burnett	Episode: "The One Where Rachel Has a Baby: Parts 1 and 2"
2002	The King of Queens	Eddie	Episode: "Connect Four"
2003	A.U.S.A.	Owen Harper	Main cast
2003	The Pitts	Keith	Episode: "Miss American Pipe"
2003	Less than Perfect	Jake Heberling	Episode: "Shampoo"
2003	See Jane Date	Kurt Batner	Television film
2003	Picking Up & Dropping Off	Charlie	Television film
2003–04	Married to the Kellys	Bob	2 episodes
2005	House	Coach Stahl	Episode: "Kids"
2005	Monk	Warren Kemp	Episode: "Mr. Monk Goes to the Office"
2005	Confessions of an American Bride	Ben Rosen	Television film
2005	Three Wise Guys	Joey	Television film
2006	Crumbs	Jody Crumb	Main cast
2006	Desperate Housewives	Frank Helm	3 episodes
2006	My Boys	Hank	4 episodes
2006–07	Big Day	Dr. Jonathan Scott	3 episodes
2007, 2017	Bones	Special Agent Tim Sullivan	5 episodes
2007	The Winner	Terry	Episode: "Glen's New Friend"
2007	Shark	Tom Brandt	Episode: "For Whom the Skel Rolls"
2008	Moonlight	Jason Abbott	Episode: "Click"
2009	Roommates	David Schick	2 episodes
2009–14	Warehouse 13	Pete Lattimer	Main cast
2010	Better Off Ted	Billy Crisp	Episode: "Mess of a Salesman"
2010	CSI: Crime Scene Investigation	Finn Thomas	Episode: "The Panty Sniffer"
2011	Fairly Legal	Chef Bo/Bobby	Episode: "Bo Me Once"
2011	Love Bites	Scott	Episode: "Sky High"
2012	Boogeyman	Michael Samuels	Television film
2013	The Mentalist	Sgt. Hawkins	Episode: "Red, White and Blue"
2013	Malibu Country	Steve	Episode: "All You Single Ladies"
2014	Modern Family	Brandon	Episode: "Three Dinners"
2014	Castle	Rogan O'Leary	Episode: "For Better or Worse"
2014	Mind Games	David Bishop	Episode: "The Sweet Science"
2014	Witches of East End	Ronan	Episode: "Art of Darkness"
2015	Backstrom	Sam Dagastino	Episode: "Bella"
2015	Battle Creek	Coach	Episode: "Homecoming"
2015	Agents of S.H.I.E.L.D.	Vin-Tak	Episode: "Who You Really Are"
2016	Supergirl	Colonel James Harper	Episode: "Manhunter"
2016	Shooter	Jack Payne	Main Cast
2018	MacGyver	Jimmy	Episode: "CO2 Sensor + Tree Branch"
2019	9-1-1	Victor Costas	Episode: "Bobby Begins Again"
2019	No Good Nick	Tony Franzelli	Recurring role
2019	My Stepfather's Secret	Hugo	Television film
2021	The Mighty Ducks: Game Changers	Rob Griffen	Recurring role

Web
Year	Title	Role	Notes
2010	Suite 7	Michael	Episode: "Good in Bed"
2011	Warehouse 13: Of Monsters and Men	Pete Lattimer	
