= Knight Rider 2010 =

1994 American made-for-television film directed by Sam Pillsbury

- Promotional poster
- Genre: Action; Science fiction
- Based on: Knight Rider
- Written by: John Leekley
- Directed by: Sam Pillsbury
- Starring: Richard Joseph Paul; Heidi Leick; Michael Beach; Don McManus
- Music by: Tim Truman
- Country of origin: United States
- Original language: English

Production
- Executive producers: Rob Cohen; John Leekley
- Producer: Alex Beaton
- Cinematography: James Bartle
- Editor: Skip Schoolnik
- Running time: 86 minutes
- Production companies: John Leekley Productions; Universal Television; MCA TV

Original release
- Network: Syndication
- Release: February 13, 1994

Knight Rider 2010 is a 1994 American science fiction action television film directed by Sam Pillsbury and written by John Leekley, loosely based on the television series Knight Rider. It is the second installment of the Knight Rider film series. The film stars Richard Joseph Paul, Heidi Leick, Michael Beach, and Don McManus. It aired in syndication in the United States on February 13, 1994, as part of Universal Television's Action Pack programming block.

== Plot ==
In a Mad Max-style future, Jake McQueen is the ultimate smuggler, smuggling in Mexicans for money to survive, only for his smuggling to come to a halt when he is busted by his brother while getting his truck repaired.

However, what he does not know is that he is under observation by Jared, the crippled head of Chrysalis Corporation, who sends one of his most valued employees, Hannah Tyree, to bring him in to work for them as part of their video games division.

Jake initially is skeptical about the idea of working with Hannah, and is scared away when she admits that she accidentally downloaded herself onto PRISM, a crystalline solid-state memory unit for her computer, once, due to an unexpected side-effect.

Jake is then hunted down after Jared has his data, and eventually finds his way back home, only to find his father near death. Acquiring a junked Mustang, and a special engine his father had kept in trust, he goes to find a way to stop Chrysalis.

While pursuing a lead, he ends up shot, and is witness to Hannah's apparent death, only to find she was trapped in her PRISM. Going into battle against Jared, with Hannah as his car's new AI, Jake eventually destroys Jared when Jake discovers the one side effect of Jared's life support: that it is slowly killing the person it protects.

Now, Jake and Hannah travel the world of the future, fighting for justice in a lawless desert that is forgotten by the world.

== Cast ==
- Richard Joseph Paul as Jake McQueen
- Heidi Leick as Hannah Tyrie
- Michael Beach as Marshal Will McQueen
- Don McManus as Dean
- Nicky Katt as Johnny
- Badja Djola as Zeke
- Mark Pellegrino as Robert Lee
- Brion James as Jared

== Production ==
=== Development ===
The early drafts of the script were far closer to the original series even including KITT (who would have been a female); however, the makers believed at that time there would be no high-tech cars. Ultimately this movie had little in common with Knight Rider's basic concept, except the title, a talking car, and the "one man can make a difference" concept.

=== Vehicle ===
The car is a custom "Ford Mustang" built on an MN12 1994 Ford Thunderbird chassis; its grunge style is very different from the sleek Pontiac cars that were the two incarnations of KITT, whose AI would have been removed and replaced with K.D. (Hannah Tyrie).

== Reception ==
A 2011 article in Wired magazine noted that Knight Rider 2010 had promised "Pimped-out muscle cars with weapons, armor, and 'Hannah' – a girl who's trapped in your onboard computer system and helps you save the world", while the reality in 2010 was characterized by "Pimped-out hybrids with cupholders".

== See also ==
- Knight Rider franchise
- Knight Rider 2000
