= Just Yell Fire =

- Directed by: Takafumi Uehara
- Written by: Dallas Jessup; Catherine Wehage; Maggie Jessup; Jay Jessup
- Produced by: Maggie Jessup; Aulani Wehage
- Starring: Josh Holloway; Dallas Jessup; Catherine Wehage; Chief Brian Martinek; Evangeline Lilly; Chad Von Dette; Park Maguire; Matthew Wadzita; Anthony Neal
- Cinematography: George Ayrouth
- Edited by: Takafumi Uehara
- Release date: 2006
- Running time: 48 minutes
- Country: United States
- Language: English

Just Yell Fire is a freely distributed 2006 film aimed at teaching young girls to defend themselves against attackers. Started as a school project by Dallas Jessup and Catherine Wehage, then freshman at St. Mary's Academy in Portland, Oregon, the project grew to include the celebrity endorsement of Josh Holloway and Evangeline Lilly of the television show Lost.

The video teaches viewers weak points on an attacker's body and how to effectively cause enough pain to those points to escape. It also tells viewers how to avoid becoming a target for rape and kidnapping to begin with.

The film's title references a point made in the video: that yelling help or rape may frighten potential witnesses or rescuers away, while yelling fire tends to draw a crowd.

== Inspiration and development ==
The idea that would become Just Yell Fire began when Jessup saw a news report including footage of Carlie Brucia being led away by Joseph P. Smith. Jessup contacted Chad Von Dette, who had instructed her in Filipino street fighting, and asked him to develop a method they could teach which would allow young girls to avoid Brucia's fate.

The project was originally going to be made on a much smaller scale. Dallas Jessup and Catherine Wehage planned to use home video equipment to shoot the project in San Diego, Von Dette's home city, during their spring break. When those plans fell through, the pair and their mothers used the additional time to begin expanding the idea.

The script was then reworked and taken to Clackamas Community College, where Wehage's mother worked. Jessup's mother attended a workshop at the college to learn about pre-production, and it was Clackamas music instructor Brian Rose who brought his friend Takafumi Uehara into the project to direct. Uehara, in turn, brought in other professionals to aid in the production.

The celebrity connection came through Wehage's cousin, who works on the set of the television series Lost. Through him, the girls were able to ask for Lilly and Holloway's aid in the project.

== Production and distribution ==
Principal shooting was done over a span of five days in June 2006, primarily on the campus of Clackamas Community College in Oregon City, Oregon. Holloway and Lilly's segments in the video were shot separately from the rest of the film, in Hawaii, while Lost was on hiatus.

The film was completed by the end of the summer. After showings in late September and early October, Just Yell Fire was released for free online download. As of April 2008, the website has exceeded 5,000,000 hits, and over 425,000 DVDs have been given away or downloaded.

Jessup, Wehage, and fellow actor Matthew Wadzita continue the project speaking at schools, summer camps, and to groups. The presentation includes a showing of the film, a question and answer session, and then every girl there receives a DVD.

Jessup has developed a training course for PE Teachers and Coaches training them to in turn train students in the Just Yell Fire self-defense techniques. In 2012, Jessup received the World of Children Youth Award.
