= Josh Holloway =

American actor (born 1969)

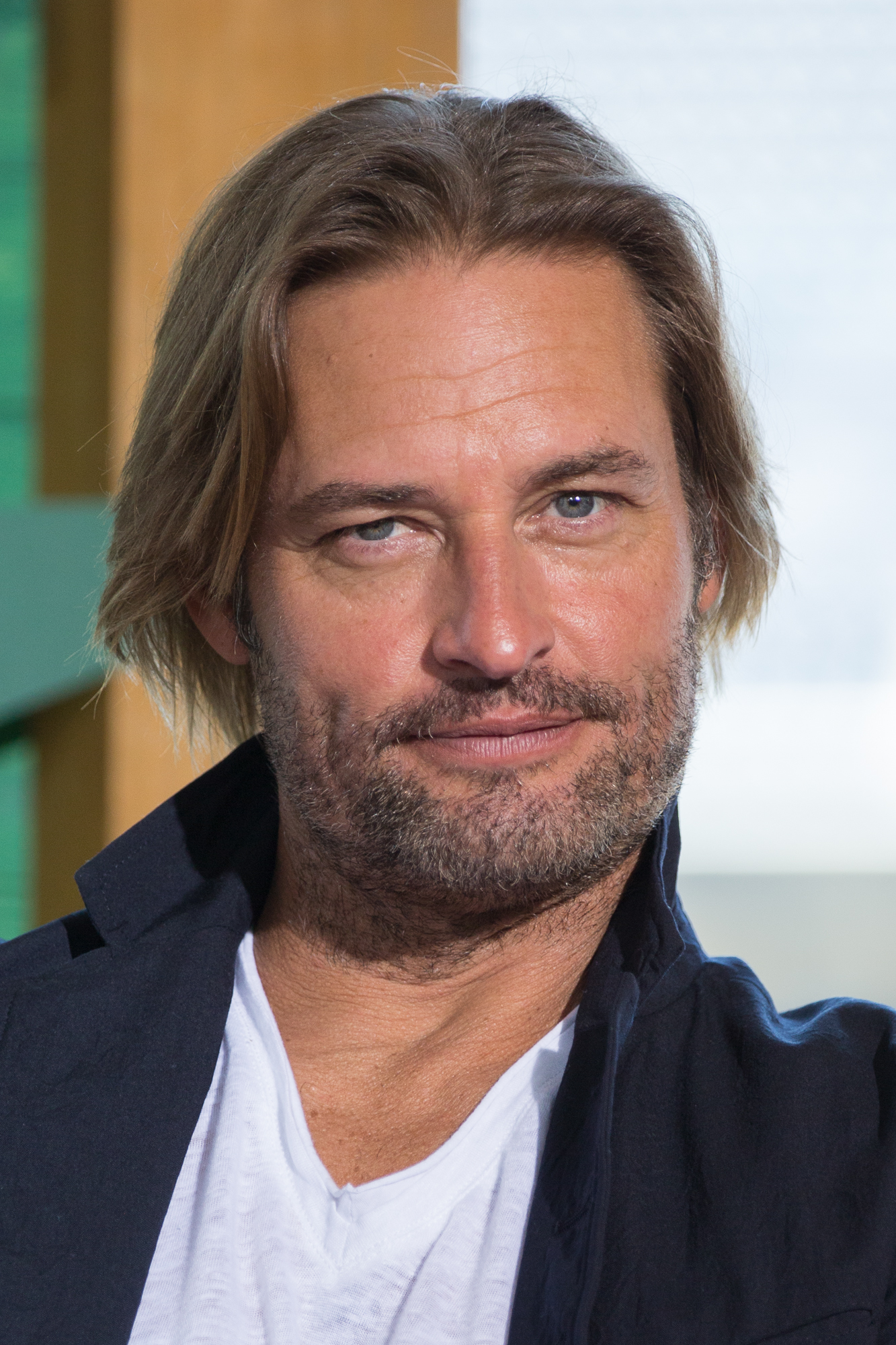
- Holloway in 2016
- Born: Joshua Lee Holloway; July 20, 1969 (age 57); San Jose, California, U.S.
- Occupation: Actor
- Years active: 1993–present
- Spouse: Yessica Kumala (m. 2004)
- Children: 2

Joshua Lee Holloway (born July 20, 1969) is an American actor. He is best known for his roles as James "Sawyer" Ford on the ABC television show Lost (2004–2010), as Will Bowman on the USA Network science fiction drama Colony (2016–2018), and as Jim Ellis in the Max crime series Duster (2025). He also had a recurring role in the third and fourth seasons of the Paramount Network western series Yellowstone (2020–2021).

== Early life ==
Holloway was born in San Jose, California, the second of four boys of a nurse mother and a surveyor father. His family moved to the Blue Ridge Mountains of Georgia when he was two. He was raised in Free Home, Georgia. Holloway is related to Baptist preacher Dr. Dale Holloway, and author and World War II prisoner of war Carl Holloway. He is also a descendant of Robert E. Lee. Holloway attended Cherokee High School in Canton, Georgia, graduating in 1987. He developed an interest in movies at a very young age. He studied at the University of Georgia but left after one quarter due to financial constraints.

== Career ==
Holloway moved to Los Angeles, where he began a successful career as a runway and print model, including for brands Dolce & Gabbana, Calvin Klein and Donna Karan. In 1993, Holloway appeared in the Aerosmith video for the song "Cryin'" as a thief who tries to steal Alicia Silverstone's backpack from a diner, only to be caught and beaten up by her.

Holloway eventually started acting. His first role was as "Good Looking Guy" in an episode of Angel in 1999, followed by a role in the comedy Doctor Benny and in the movies Mi Amigo, Moving August, and Cold Heart. Following these roles, he gained recognition for his lead role in the Sci-Fi Channel movie Sabretooth with David Keith and John Rhys-Davies. He also made appearances in Good Girls Don't episode "Addicted To Love"; NCIS episode "My Other Left Foot"; The Lyon's Den episode "Separation Anxiety"; Walker, Texas Ranger episode "Medieval Crimes"; and CSI: Crime Scene Investigation episode "Assume Nothing".

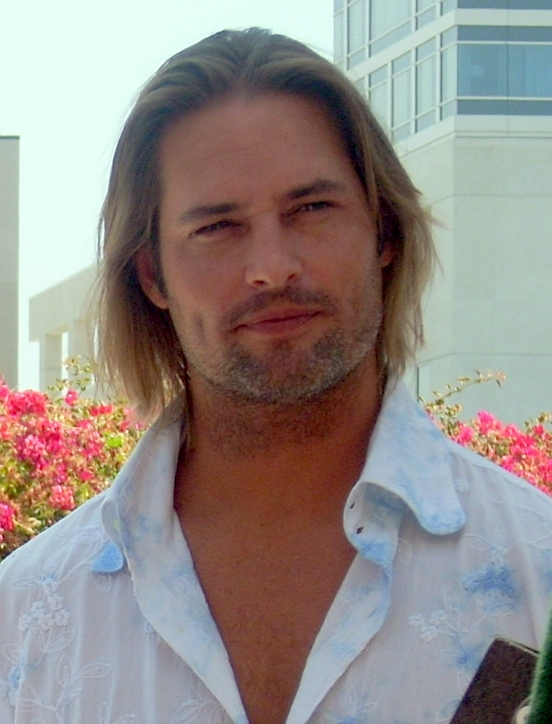
Holloway at the 2009 San Diego Comic-Con

His big break came when he was cast as James "Sawyer" Ford in the hit television series Lost. The show propelled Holloway to celebrity status, but left him with little time to leverage his fame with other roles. According to USA Today, he took himself out of consideration for a role in a Brad Pitt Western due to the demands of his filming schedule. Nevertheless, he found time to star in the thriller Whisper and he also ventured into the world of video games in Command & Conquer 3: Tiberium Wars. In the game, he plays the role of a Brotherhood of Nod intelligence officer named Ajay whose primary role is to assist players by supplying information that is crucial to upcoming battles. In May 2007, 20th Century Fox approached Holloway for the second time and offered him the role of Gambit in X-Men 4. In 2005, People magazine named Holloway one of the "50 Most Beautiful People in the World". In January 2006, In Touch Weekly named Holloway the "hottest hunk" on television. In the same month, Holloway was voted the seventeenth-sexiest guy worldwide by British readers of OK! magazine. In the same year, he was voted the second-sexiest star in Hollywood by Us Weekly.

In March 2007, Holloway was selected as the new face for Davidoff's fragrance Cool Water worldwide. In Spring 2008, Holloway was selected as the first male spokesperson for Magnum ice cream of Turkey. Previous Magnum spokespersons include Eva Longoria and Elizabeth Hurley. In the same year he made the top ten list of TV Guide's Sexiest Stars.

Holloway appeared in the 2009 film Stay Cool, a comedy written by the Polish brothers. Artist Salvador Larroca is believed by Comic Book Resources columnist Timothy Callahan to have used Holloway as the model for his rendition of Tony Stark during his run on Iron Man, which began in 2008. In June 2010, Holloway won a Saturn Award for "Best Actor on Television" for his role on Lost. In September 2010, Holloway was added to the cast of Mission: Impossible – Ghost Protocol, which was released in December 2011. In 2014, Holloway starred in the lead role in the CBS television show Intelligence as a cybercrime agent who can "access the entire electromagnetic spectrum" with his mind.

In 2016, Holloway began starring in Colony as Will Bowman, a former FBI agent who, in a bid to protect his family, is forced to collaborate with the occupational government to bring down the growing resistance movement inside the L.A. colony in the near future. Colony marked a Lost reunion for Holloway and executive producer Carlton Cuse.

In 2021, Holloway was cast as the lead in the television show Duster (2025). The show eventually premiered in 2025 after 5 years in development.

In April 2025, Holloway signed on to star in and produce Flint, a feature film adaptation of a Louis L'Amour novel.

Holloway stars as a fighter pilot in the ongoing live-action miniseries Hour Zero which serves as a prequel to the then-upcoming video game Ace Combat 8: Wings of Theve. While initially having reservations about working on another video game project, Holloway had enjoyed the Ace Combat series as a teenager and had his interest further piqued in the genre as a result of Top Gun: Maverick.

== Personal life ==
At the end of shooting the Lost pilot in Oahu, Hawaii, Holloway proposed to his Indonesian long-time girlfriend, Yessica Kumala. The couple married on October 1, 2004. They have two children.

== Filmography ==
=== Film ===
Year	Title	Role	Notes
2001	Cold Heart	Sean Clark	
2002	Moving August	Loren Carol	
2002	Mi Amigo	Younger Pal	
2002	Against All Evidence	Uncredited	
2003	Doctor Benny	Pheb	
2006	Just Yell Fire	Himself	
2007	Whisper	Max Truemont	
2009	Stay Cool	Wino	
2011	Mission: Impossible – Ghost Protocol	IMF Agent Trevor Hanaway	
2013	Battle of the Year	Jason Blake	
2013	Paranoia	FBI Agent Gamble	
2014	Sabotage	DEA Agent Eddie "Neck" Jordan	
2024	Getting Lost	Himself	
2026	He Bled Neon		Post-production
2027	One Second After	John Matherson	Post-production

=== Television ===
Year	Title	Role	Notes
1999	Angel	Good-Looking Guy	Episode: "City Of"
2001	Walker, Texas Ranger	Ben Wiley	Episode: "Medieval Crimes"
2002	Sabretooth	Trent Parks	Television movie
2003	CSI: Crime Scene Investigation	Kenny Richmond	Episode: "Assume Nothing"
2003	The Lyon's Den	Lana's Boytoy	Episode: "Separation Anxiety"
2004	NCIS	Sheriff	Episode: "My Other Left Foot"
2004	Good Girls Don't	Eric	Episode: "Addicted to Love"
2004–2010	Lost	James "Sawyer" Ford	Main role
2011	Community	Black Rider	Episode: "A Fistful of Paintballs"
2011	Five	Bill	Television film
2013	Yo Gabba Gabba!	Farmer Josh	Episode: "Farm"
2014	Intelligence	Gabriel Vaughn	Main role
2016–2018	Colony	Will Bowman	Main role
2020	Amazing Stories	Wayne Wilkes	Episode: "Signs of Life"
2020–2021	Yellowstone	Roarke Morris	Recurring role (seasons 3–4)
2025	Duster	Jim Ellis	Main role
2025	The Paper	Himself	Episode: "Scam Alert"
2026	Hour Zero	"Ledger"	Main role

=== Music videos ===
Year	Title	Role	Notes
1993	"Cryin'"	Thief	Acting debut

=== Video games ===
Year	Title	Role	Notes
2007	Command & Conquer 3: Tiberium Wars	Ajay	
2026	Ace Combat 8: Wings of Theve	Braswell	Hour Zero Live-Action

== Awards and nominations ==
Year	Award	Category	Nominated work	Result
2005	Screen Actors Guild Awards	Outstanding Performance by an Ensemble in a Drama Series	Lost	Won
2005	Teen Choice Awards	Choice TV: Male Breakout Star	Lost	Nominated
2006	Saturn Award	Best Supporting Actor on Television	Lost	Nominated
2006	Teen Choice Awards	Choice TV: Chemistry (shared with Evangeline Lilly and Matthew Fox)	Lost	Nominated
2007	Saturn Award	Best Supporting Actor on Television	Lost	Nominated
2008	Saturn Award	Best Supporting Actor on Television	Lost	Nominated
2008	Teen Choice Awards	Choice TV Actor: Action	Lost	Nominated
2009	Saturn Award	Best Actor on Television	Lost	Won
2009	Teen Choice Awards	Choice TV Actor: Action	Lost	Nominated
2010	Teen Choice Awards	Choice TV Actor Fantasy/Sci-Fi	Lost	Nominated
