= Hudson Leick =

American actress (born 1969)

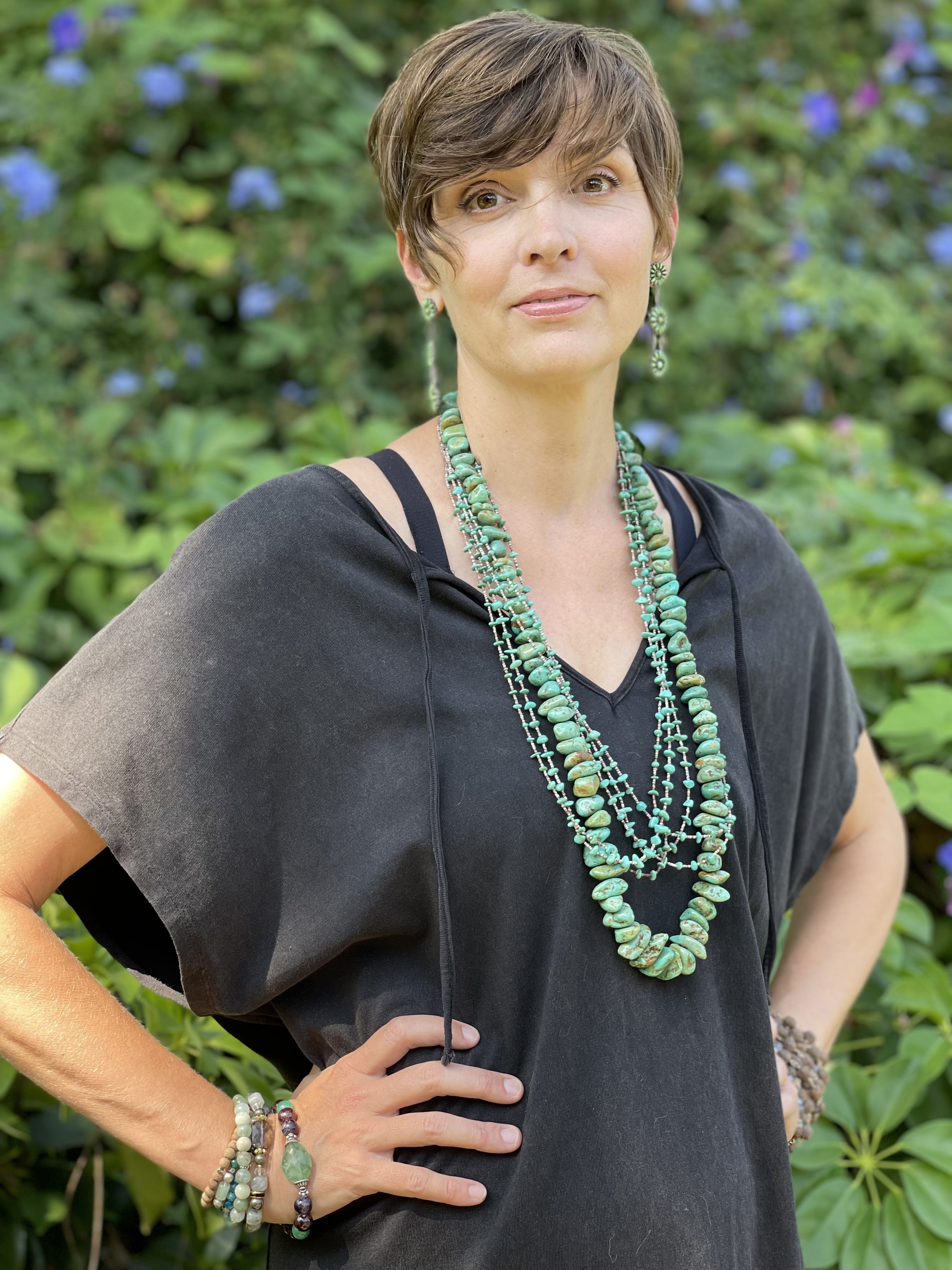
- Leick in 2025
- Born: May 9, 1969 (age 57); Cincinnati, Ohio, U.S.
- Occupations: Actress, model, yoga instructor, intuitive counselor
- Years active: 1992–2018
- Website: hudsonleick.com

Hudson Leick (born May 9, 1969) is an American former actress, known for her role as villainess Callisto in the television series Xena: Warrior Princess and Hercules: The Legendary Journeys.

== Early life ==
Leick was born in Cincinnati, Ohio, on May 9, 1969, and grew up in Rochester, New York.

== Career ==
=== Acting ===
Leick started her career as a model in Japan, but decided to concentrate on acting. She took courses in drama and diction to improve her voice. In 1992, she appeared in one episode of the series CBS Schoolbreak Special. The following year, Leick appeared in an episode of Law & Order. She played a small role as a "sexpot" in University Hospital as nurse Tracy Stone. In 1994, she appeared as the virtual reality designer Hannah in the television film Knight Rider 2010.

Leick's big break came in 1995 when she won a part on Melrose Place. Leick appeared in ten episodes of the series. After a couple of small roles in Hijacked: Flight 285 and Dangerous Cargo, the director Robert Tapert selected Leick for the role of Callisto on Xena: Warrior Princess. Leick also portrayed Callisto on three episodes of Xena companion TV series Hercules: The Legendary Journeys, as well as portraying screenwriter/producer Liz Friedman in two modern-day episodes.

In 2000, Leick announced at a convention that she would not be in more episodes of Xena: Warrior Princess or Hercules: The Legendary Journeys because she was being offered more and different roles, and felt that she needed to play another character besides Callisto. Beginning in 1999, she appeared in the films Chill Factor, Hallowed Ground, Blood Type, Denial, and After the Game, and had roles in the series 7th Heaven, Touched by an Angel, and Safe Harbor. She performed in A.I. Assault, CSI: Crime Scene Investigation, Lords of Everquest, Tru Calling (in its pilot episode), the voice of Jen in the computer game Primal, Fastlane, and Cold Heart.

In 2008, Leick finished the films One, Two, Many and Unconditional. She played the role of Coco DeVille in the Jackie Collins film, Paris Connections, which was released in 2010.

== Filmography ==
=== Film ===
Year	Title	Role	Notes
1996	Dangerous Cargo	Carla	
1997	After the Game	Grace	
1998	Denial	Deborah	
1999	Chill Factor	Vaughn	
2001	Cold Heart	Julia	
2006	A.I. Assault	Tiffany Smith	Television film
2007	Hallowed Ground	Sarah Austin	Video
2008	One, Two, Many	Darla	
2008	Unconditional	Alice	Short film
2010	Paris Connections	Coco De Ville	
2011	All It Will Ever Be	Unknown	Short film
2013	Mid Life Gangster	Alexis	
2018	Blood Type	Tiffanie	

=== Television ===
Year	Title	Role	Notes
1992	CBS Schoolbreak Special	Stephanie	Episode: "Sexual Considerations"
1993	Law & Order	Kathy Rogers	Episode: "Black Tie"
1994	Knight Rider 2010	Hannah Tyrie	Television film
1995	University Hospital	Tracy Stone	Main role
1995	Melrose Place	Shelly Hanson	Recurring role (season 4), 10 episodes
1996	Hijacked: Flight 285	Shayna Loring	Television film
1996–2000	Xena: Warrior Princess	Callisto / Xena	Recurring role, 12 episodes
1997	Touched by an Angel	Celeste	2 episodes
1997–1999	Hercules: The Legendary Journeys	Callisto, Liz Friedman	5 episodes
1998	7th Heaven	Ms. Hunter	Episode: "Homecoming"
1999	Safe Harbor	Delores	Episode: "One More Time: The Great Escape"
2003	Fastlane	Randi	Episode: "101"
2003	Tru Calling	Rebecca Morgan	Episode: Pilot
2005	CSI: Crime Scene Investigation	Dr. Jeri "Buffy" Cohen	Episode: "Bite Me"
2007	Nip/Tuck	Fake Wendy	Episode: "Dr. Joshua Lee"
2008	Shark	Cindy Broyles	Episode: "Bar Fight"
2010	Law & Order: LA	Carly's Personal Shopper	Episode: "Playa Vista"

=== Video games ===
Year	Title	Role	Notes
2003	Primal	Jennifer "Jen" Tate	
2003	Lords of EverQuest	Lady Leisen	
