= Terminal Voyage =

Terminal Voyage (AKA: Star Quest)
- Home video cover art
- Directed by: Rick Jacobson
- Screenplay by: Mark Evan Schwartz
- Story by: Rob Kerchner
- Produced by: Mike Elliott; Exec.Producers: Lance H. Robbins; Mike Upton
- Starring: Steven Bauer; Emma Samms; Brenda Bakke; Cliff DeYoung
- Cinematography: John B. Aronson
- Edited by: John Gilbert
- Music by: Nigel Holton
- Production company: Saban Entertainment
- Distributed by: Concorde Pictures
- Release dates: 1994 (Limited); November 8, 1996 (Television)
- Running time: 79 minutes (film version); 90 minutes (TV version)
- Country: United States
- Language: English

Terminal Voyage (also known as Star Quest or Starquest) is a 1994 science fiction film directed by Rick Jacobson and starring Steven Bauer, Emma Samms, Brenda Bakke, Cliff DeYoung.

The film was produced by Saban Entertainment and distributed by Roger Corman's New Concorde. The film was broadcast on the TV in 1996 under the title Star Quest.

== Plot ==
In 2035, global warming rendered the Earth barely habitable and its human population is on the verge of extinction. The Earth Federation sends a space ship on a century-long trip to a distant planet Trion which could be suitable for colonization. The eight crew-members come from Russia, United States, China, United Kingdom, France, and Saudi Arabia.

As the ship approaches Trion, the crew wakes from hibernation. They immediately find a decomposed corpse of the captain in his capsule. The ship's XO, Commander Hollis, assumes command. When he reads a secure transmission from Earth received while they were sleeping, he commits suicide, leaving a note that he "joins his loved ones". The new CO, Lieutenant Jammad, reveals the content of the message: the Earth has been devastated in a nuclear holocaust.

Zinovitz discovers that the ship's systems have been tampered with. A fight for power ensues and Becker, as a representative of the government, relieves Jammad from command. He is soon found dead in a malfunctioned virtual reality simulator. The remaining crew-members suspect that Becker killed the officers and use force to arrest her, discovering in process that she is an android.

When questioned, Becker denies any guilt then sets off the self-destruction sequence. Granier and Han are too devastated to continue and commit suicide with a morphine overdose, and Reese and Zinovitz make it to the escape capsule. As the countdown reaches zero, they find themselves in an underground simulation facility stationed on Earth. There was no space flight – it is their final test, an "extreme stress simulation" scenario which involved the death of the commanding officer and multiple system failures. The crew have only been in hibernation for 6 months, and Hollis, Jammad and Becker apparently knew about the test.

However the nuclear war on Earth was indeed real, and the facility is empty and abandoned. The film ends with a view of a destroyed city, as Reese and Zinovitz look on to uncertain future.

== Cast ==
- Steven Bauer as Reese
- Emma Samms as Becker
- Brenda Bakke as Zinovitz
- Cliff DeYoung as Granier
- Ming-Na Wen as Dr. Han
- Alan Rachins as Lieutenant Jammad
- Gregory McKinney as Commander Hollis
- Lisa Boyle as Veiled Woman
- Marcus Aurelius as Survivor

== Recognition ==
=== Reception ===
In The Sci-Fi Movie Guide writes that the film was competently told, had a good cast, and had a "nice O'Henry ending".

In their lengthy positive review of its 1996 television release, New York Daily News began with the qualification "Were this the average USA Network or Sci-Fi Channel telemovie, I'd say the shelf is where it belongs, and that it ought to ferment for at least another decade. Star Quest, however, is an above-average effort especially if graded on the USA/Sci-Fi curve". They wrote, "because of the cast, and a few nice plot twists and surprises, Star Quest ends up being a good effort in this genre certainly good enough to have been released before now". They concluded "Rick Jacobson has faith in all his actors: Some scenes are photographed in long extended master shots, while others rely totally upon the talents and closeups of single performers. Brilliant? No. Fun? Yes".

=== Awards and nominations ===
The film received a 1996 Saturn Award nomination for 'Best Genre Video Release' from the Academy of Science Fiction, Fantasy and Horror Films.
