= Theophany =

Appearance of a deity in an observable way

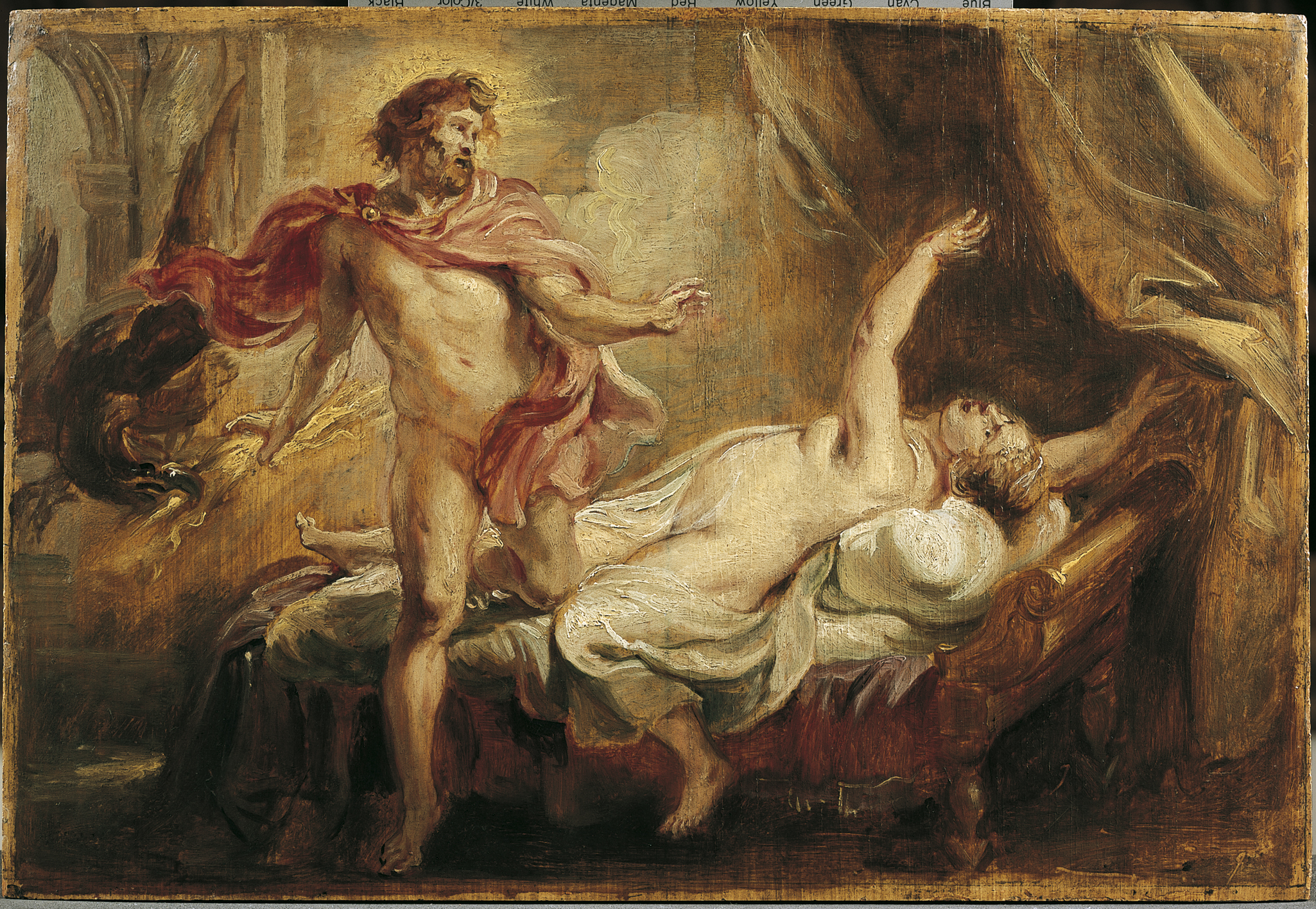
Peter Paul Rubens' Death of Semele, caused by the Theophany of Zeus without a mortal disguise

Theophany (Ancient Greek: θεοφάνεια, romanized: theopháneia, lit. 'appearance of a deity') is an encounter with a deity that manifests in an observable and tangible form. It is often confused with other types of encounters with a deity, but these interactions are not considered theophanies unless the deity reveals itself in a visible form. Traditionally, the term "theophany" was used to refer to appearances of the gods in ancient Greek and Near Eastern religions. While the Iliad is the earliest source for descriptions of theophanies in classical antiquity, the first description appears in the Epic of Gilgamesh.

In numerous creation stories, a deity or deities speak with many kinds of animals, often prior to the formation of dry land on earth.

== Definition and etymology ==
The term theophany derives from the Ancient Greek word θεοφάνεια (theopháneia), meaning "appearance of a god", from (Ancient Greek: θεός theós "divinity", and phainein (φαίνειν, "to show" or "to appear"). In classical usage, it referred to visible appearances of deities to humans, especially in mythological contexts. These could be in anthropomorphic form or as other phenomena—light, fire, or cloud—and often served to affirm the deity's favor, deliver a message, or enact divine will. Similarly, in the Hebrew Bible and related literature, theophanies are often characterized by awe-inspiring phenomena such as thunder, fire, clouds, or bright light.

In modern academic usage, "theophany" is used across religious traditions to describe any tangible manifestation of a deity in a form accessible to human perception, especially visual. It is distinct from terms like divine inspiration, revelation, or incarnation, which refer to different types of religious experience. If the divine presence is expressed more broadly without being tied to a specific deity, the term hierophany may be preferred.

== In ancient religions ==
Theophany played a prominent role in the mythological and ritual life of many ancient cultures. These manifestations of deities were understood not only as mythic narratives but also as real interventions into the world, often forming the basis of cultic practices, political legitimacy, or sacred geography. In ancient literature, theophanies frequently mark the establishment of divine authority or the commissioning of heroic or prophetic figures.

=== Mesopotamia ===
One of the earliest literary examples of a theophany occurs in the Epic of Gilgamesh, in which dreams and signs from the gods shape the journey of the hero. In Mesopotamian religion, divine appearances were often mediated through symbolic forms rather than direct anthropomorphic encounters. These included dreams, omens, celestial phenomena, or the interpretation of sacrificial entrails (extispicy), which were understood as messages from the gods.

Dreams held a privileged place as vehicles of divine communication. In the Epic of Gilgamesh, both Gilgamesh and Enkidu receive dreams interpreted as divine guidance or warning. Similarly, in the Atrahasis myth, the god Enki communicates with the hero through a wall-dream to warn of the impending flood.

Sacred statues were also considered theophanic, not merely symbolic. The cult image (ṣalmu) of a deity, once ritually enlivened in ceremonies such as the mouth-washing ritual (mīs pî), was believed to embody the living presence of the god. These statues could be carried into battle, consulted for oracles, or housed in temples where their "appearance" through ritual unveiling was part of public theophanic experience.

The gods of Mesopotamia were understood to be simultaneously transcendent and present through their manifestations. Theophanies reinforced divine kingship, the legitimacy of priestly authority, and the city’s connection to the divine order of the cosmos.

=== Ancient Egypt ===
In Ancient Egyptian religion, theophanies were deeply integrated into both theology and kingship. Gods could manifest in animal, human, or composite forms, and divine presence was encountered not only in myth but also in ritual, sacred architecture, and royal ideology. The Pharaoh was considered the nṯr nfr ("perfect god") and the son of Re, functioning as the living manifestation of divine order (maat) on earth. Coronation rituals affirmed the king’s divine descent, and temple inscriptions regularly described the king speaking face-to-face with gods or receiving blessings in person. These theophanic encounters, though formulaic, were understood as real events within the cultic framework.

Theophany was also enacted in ritual, especially through cult statues, which served as loci of divine presence. After undergoing a ritual of animation ("opening of the mouth"), these statues were housed in temple sanctuaries and revealed only to priests during daily rituals. In major festivals, however, they were carried in processions and paraded before the public, allowing the god to "appear" to the people.

Deities could also reveal themselves through natural phenomena, especially in myths. The sun god Ra manifested daily in the solar theophany of sunrise and sunset, defeating chaos and reaffirming the world’s order. In myth, gods such as Isis and Horus took human form to intervene in the affairs of mortals, though these stories were told more as divine dramas than as historical events. Overall, Egyptian theophany was less focused on singular, ecstatic visions and more on the structured, ritualized presence of the gods as maintained through temple worship, kingship, and cosmic cycles.

=== Ancient Greece ===
In ancient Greek religion, theophanies typically occurred through visions or dreams, either spontaneously or as the result of ritual preparation. Although rare in historical accounts, mythological literature contains numerous examples of gods appearing to mortals in anthropomorphic form. These include Zeus appearing to Semele, Athena guiding Odysseus, or Apollo communicating with seers and prophets.

In historical cult practice, theophanies were reenacted and commemorated in ritual settings. At Delphi, the Theophania (Θεοφάνια) was an annual spring festival celebrating the return of Apollo from his winter sojourn in Hyperborea. The climax of the festival involved the ritual unveiling of a sacred image of the god, usually concealed in the inner adyton of the temple.

The Greek concept of epiphaneia (ἐπιφάνεια), closely related to theophany, emphasized the sudden and overwhelming appearance of the divine, especially in times of crisis. These manifestations could be experienced as visions, voices, or omens, and were often incorporated into local legends or used to legitimate political decisions. Some theorists, such as Julian Jaynes, have argued that such experiences reflect a now-lost mode of consciousness in which divine agency was perceived as external and directive, particularly in moments of stress or decision.

=== Ancient Rome ===
The tradition of divine appearance through dreams or altered consciousness continued into the Hellenistic and Roman periods, where theophanies were increasingly associated with mystery cults and healing sanctuaries, such as those of Asclepius. In these contexts, supplicants would undergo ritual incubation (enkoimesis), sleeping within temple precincts in hopes of receiving a healing vision or instruction from the deity. Such theophanies were typically reported as dreams but were believed to be real encounters with the divine.

Roman religion also inherited and formalized the practice of recognizing divine epiphanies in public life. Gods could manifest through omens, natural signs, or the sudden presence of a stranger delivering a divine message. These events were officially interpreted by augurs or priests of the state cults and could influence civic decisions. The prodigia reported in Roman historical sources, such as earthquakes, lightning strikes on temples, or spontaneous phenomena involving statues, were often treated as indirect theophanies that required ritual expiation.

In the imperial cult, the line between divinity and humanity was further blurred. Roman emperors, particularly after death, were often venerated as divine or semi-divine beings. Temples to the Divus Julius and Divus Augustus institutionalized a form of theophanic presence, particularly during imperial festivals or military triumphs. The appearance of a halo or comet, such as the Sidus Iulium at Caesar’s funeral games, was interpreted as a visible sign of apotheosis and divine approval.

Theophanic experience in Roman mystery religions—such as the cults of Mithras, Isis, and the Eleusinian Mysteries—often emphasized visionary transformation, secrecy, and personal encounter with a god. Initiates sometimes reported seeing gods directly, especially in post-initiation visions. In this sense, Roman theophanies combined elements of civic ritual, philosophical symbolism, and personal mystical experience.

== In Abrahamic traditions ==
=== Judaism ===
In Judaism, theophanies are a central theme of the Tanakh, where God is portrayed as revealing Himself to individuals or groups through visible or audible manifestations. These events are typically characterized by overwhelming natural phenomena—fire, cloud, thunder, or bright light—and often occur in moments of covenant, instruction, or deliverance.

One of the most prominent theophanies in the Hebrew Bible is the appearance of God to Moses at the burning bush on Mount Horeb, where the bush blazes with fire yet is not consumed. This encounter initiates Moses's prophetic mission and is followed by the theophany at Mount Sinai, in which God descends in fire, thunder, and cloud to give the Ten Commandments to Israel. Other theophanic moments include the appearance of God to Abraham in the form of three men (Genesis 18), to Jacob in a dream at Bethel (Genesis 28), and to the entire Israelite community in the pillar of cloud and fire during the Exodus from Egypt (Exodus 13:21–22).

These appearances are understood in classical Jewish theology not as direct vision of God's essence—considered impossible—but as mediated manifestations that preserve God's transcendence. The language of sight and sound is often interpreted metaphorically by commentators like Maimonides, who stressed the philosophical principle that God is incorporeal and cannot truly be seen.

The Shekhinah, a term used in rabbinic literature to denote the indwelling or presence of God, is sometimes described in quasi-theophanic terms, especially in mystical Judaism. The Merkabah visions in the Book of Ezekiel, and later elaborations in Jewish mysticism, also depict visionary encounters with the divine that combine symbolic imagery with cosmic elements.

=== Christianity ===
Christians generally recognize the same Old Testament theophanies as the Jews. In addition, there are at least two events seen as theophanies mentioned in the New Testament, the baptism and transfiguration of Jesus (epiphanies). While some Eastern Orthodox Churches refer to the baptism of Jesus by John the Baptist as "theophany", some theologians discourage such usage, arguing that the entire life of Jesus must be seen as a prolonged theophany.

Traditional analysis of the Biblical passages led Christian scholars to understand theophany as an unambiguous manifestation of God to man. Otherwise, the more general term hierophany is used.

==== Latter Day Saint movement ====
The Latter Day Saint movement regards a series of theophanic events as foundational to its theology and origins. The most significant is the First Vision, in which Joseph Smith reported that, at the age of fourteen, he experienced a vision of God the Father and Jesus Christ in a grove near his home in upstate New York. This event is considered a theophany in Latter Day Saint movement and marks the beginning of the Restoration in Latter-day Saint belief.

The Book of Mormon also contains accounts of divine manifestations. Mark Alan Wright has examined these narratives in the context of Mesoamerican sacred traditions, suggesting that such theophanies and hierophanies reflect both ancient Near Eastern and New World cultural frameworks.

=== Islam ===
The Miʿrāj, the Prophet Muhammad's ascent into heaven, is sometimes interpreted as a form of theophany, although direct encounter with God is veiled or metaphysical. The Prophet is guided by the angel Jibrīl (Gabriel) and is traditionally said to approach the Divine Presence at the highest heaven.

=== Druze Faith ===
Hamza ibn Ali ibn Ahmad is considered the founder of the Druze and the primary author of the Druze manuscripts, he proclaimed that God had become human and taken the form of man, al-Hakim bi-Amr Allah. al-Hakim bi-Amr Allah is an important figure in the Druze faith whose eponymous founder ad-Darazi proclaimed him as the incarnation of God in 1018.

=== Baháʼí Faith ===
The Baháʼí Faith believes that God is manifest in the prophets. The "Manifestation of God" is a concept that refers to prophets like Zoroaster, Gautama Buddha, Abraham, Moses, Jesus, Muhammad, the Báb, and Baháʼu'lláh. The Manifestations of God are a series of personages who reflect the attributes of the divine in the human world, for the progress and advancement of human morals and civilization.

A 1991 article in the Journal of Bahá’í Studies (JBS), described "Bahá’í theophanology" as "acceptance of the Prophet, or 'Manifestation of God,' who speaks on behalf of God." The author explained that Bahá’u’lláh wrote a series of epistles in the 1860s to kings and rulers, including Pope Pius IX, Napoleon III, Tsar Alexander II of Russia, Queen Victoria, and Naser al-Din Shah Qajar, in a "forceful, theophanic voice" calling them to undertake reforms. These letters were published in a compilation entitled Summons of the Lord of Hosts in 2002. The JBS article described Bahá’u’lláh's "Theophanology" as "progressivist". He claimed "spiritual Authority" in these letters in which he warned western leaders of the dangers facing humanity should they choose to not act on His Guidance.

== In Indian and East Asian traditions ==
=== Hinduism ===
The most well-known theophany is in the Bhagavad Gita, one chapter of the larger epic of Mahabharata. On the battlefield of Kurukshetra, the god Krishna gives the famed warrior Arjuna a series of teachings. Arjuna begs for Krishna to reveal his "universal form." Krishna complies and gives Arjuna the spiritual vision, enabling him to see Krishna in the universal form.

A number of other theophanies are described in the Mahabharata. First, the god Indra's appearance to Kunti, with the subsequent birth of the hero Arjuna. Near the end of the epic, the god Yama takes the form of a dog to test the compassion of Yudhishthira. Even though Yudhishthira is told he may not enter paradise with such an animal, he refuses to abandon his companion, earning him praise from Dharma.

In the Hindu Ramayana, the God Hanuman is informed by deities, and usually consciously addressed by them.

=== Chinese mythology ===
In Chinese mythology, particularly in the Ming dynasty novel Journey to the West, the Monkey King, Sun Wukong, encounters bodhisattvas such as Guanyin and the Buddha himself, along with numerous deities from the Daoist and Buddhist pantheons. These appearances function as theophanies within the cosmological framework of Chinese religion and literature.

== Modern and contemporary views ==
=== Reported experiences ===
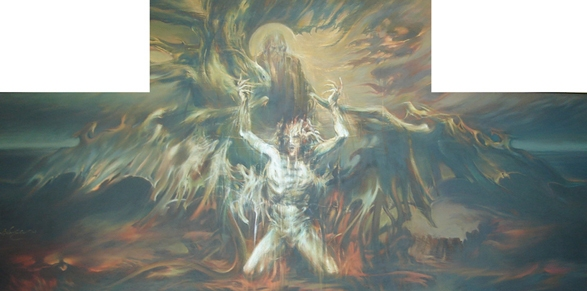
Teofanía by Mexican artist Antonio García Vega

Science fiction writer Philip K. Dick reportedly had a Theophany on 3 February 1974, which would become the basis for his semi-biographic works VALIS (1981) and Radio Free Albemuth (1985).

In 1977, Michel Potay testified he witnessed five Theophanies. He published the text he says he received from God in "The Book", the second part of The Revelation of Ares.

There are a large number of modern cases which have been rendered into print, film, and otherwise conveyed to broad publics. Some cases have become popular books and media, including:

- A Course in Miracles which is attested as divinely channeled;
- The Attentive Heart: Conversations with Trees, in which the spirits contacted are resident in species that do not usually speak in the ordinary sense of human speech.

These instances are distinguished from cases in which divine encounters are explicitly considered fictional by the author, a frequent motif in speculative fiction such as in Julian May's Galactic Milieu Series.

=== Psychological and phenomenological views ===
Modern psychology of religion and phenomenology have approached theophany not only as a theological concept but also as a human experience shaped by culture, cognition, and altered states of consciousness. Scholars in these fields investigate theophanies as phenomena that reveal both the structure of religious consciousness and the dynamics of visionary or numinous experience.

William James, in The Varieties of Religious Experience (1902), treated theophanies as part of a broader category of mystical and revelatory experience. He emphasized the subjective intensity and life-transforming nature of such encounters, proposing that their psychological authenticity can be studied independently of their objective truth.

Rudolf Otto's influential work The Idea of the Holy (1917) described theophanic experience in terms of the numinous, characterized by mysterium tremendum et fascinans—a sense of awe, fear, and attraction before the presence of the wholly Other. Otto's phenomenological analysis does not focus on specific religious traditions but on the universal structure of the experience itself, which he regarded as sui generis.

In more recent scholarship, Carl Jung and his followers interpreted theophanies as symbolic expressions of the collective unconscious, often emerging in dreams or visionary states. Jung saw the archetype of the "Self" as capable of appearing in divine or godlike form in such experiences.

Anthropological and cognitive theories of religion, such as those advanced by Pascal Boyer and others, explore theophanies as culturally patterned manifestations of agency detection and hyperactive cognitive processes. These approaches emphasize how human minds interpret ambiguous stimuli—dreams, natural events, internal voices—as potentially divine in origin.

While some scholars stress the authenticity of theophanic reports within their religious frameworks, others see such experiences as shaped by psychological states including trauma, ecstasy, dissociation, or neurological anomalies. In this view, theophanies are not dismissed as hallucinations, but contextualized as deeply meaningful within the lived world of the experiencer.

== See also ==
- Angel of the Lord – Entity in the Bible
- Beatific vision – Christian theological term
- Darshan – Auspicious sight of a deity or holy person
- Divine embodiment
