= Garrett Sim =

American basketball player (born 1990)

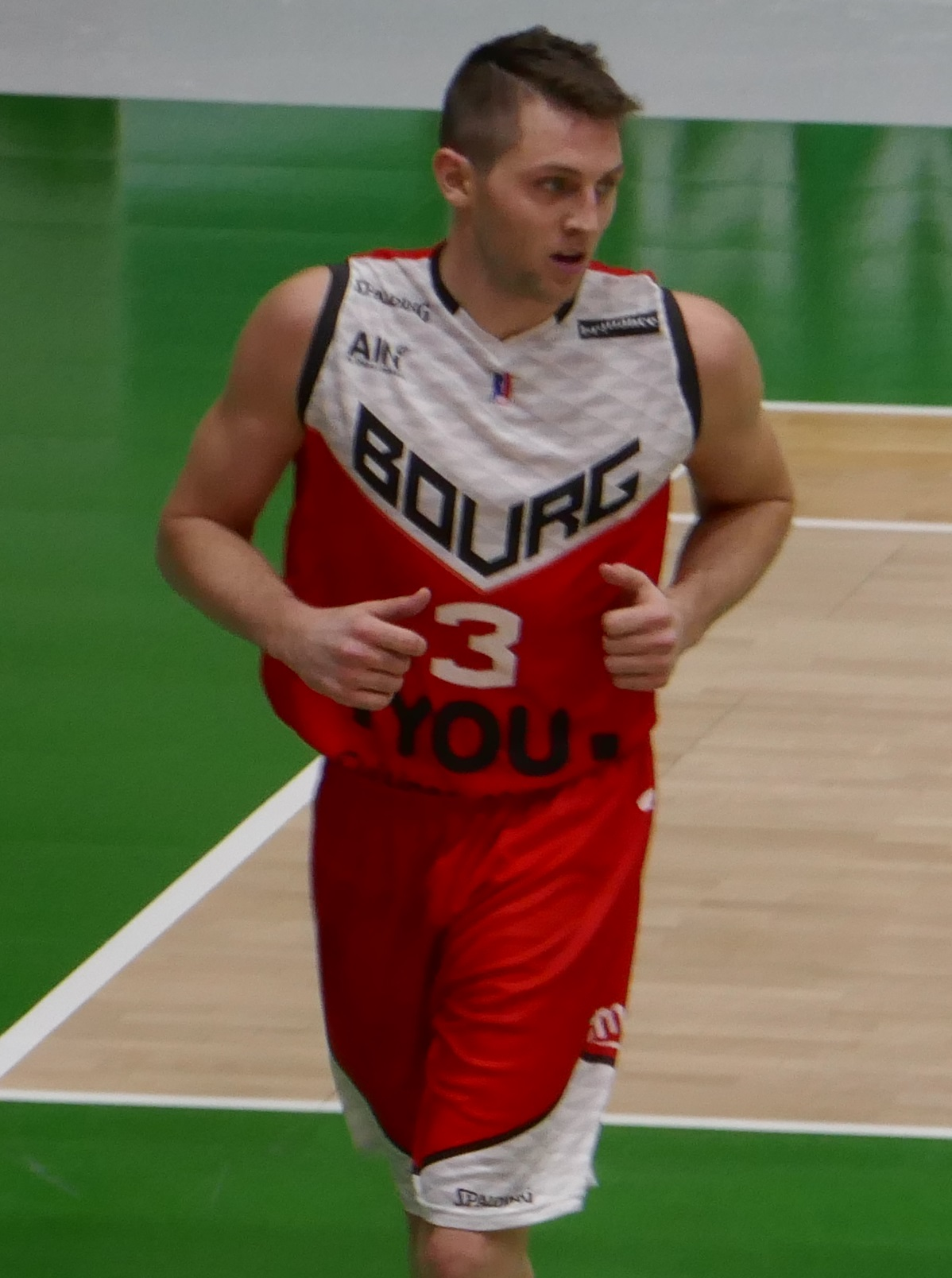

Free Agent
- Position: Point guard

Personal information
- Born: July 10, 1990 (age 36) Portland, Oregon
- Listed height: 6 ft 2 in (1.88 m)
- Listed weight: 185 lb (84 kg)

Career information
- High school: Sunset (Beaverton, Oregon)
- College: Oregon (2008–2012)
- NBA draft: 2012: undrafted
- Playing career: 2012–present

Career history
- 2012–2013: Science City Jena
- 2013: Vancouver Volcanoes
- 2013–2014: Science City Jena
- 2014–2015: Crailsheim Merlins
- 2015–2016: Boulogne
- 2016–2020: JL Bourg
- 2020–2021: Élan Chalon
- 2021–2022: Sigortam.net İTÜ BB
- 2022–2023: Élan Béarnais Pau-Orthez

Career highlights
- Pro B champion (2017)

Garrett Timothy Sim (born July 10, 1990) is an American professional basketball player who last played for Élan Béarnais Pau-Orthez for the French Pro A.

== College career ==
Sim came to the University of Oregon from Sunset High School, where he posted 23 points and 9 assists per game as a senior. As a freshman at Oregon, he started 26 games and set his career high of 28 points against Utah. He had confidence issues as a sophomore and started five games. After the season coach Ernie Kent was fired but Sim remained loyal to the program. As a senior, he averaged 12.2 points and 2.5 assists per game.

== Professional career ==
Sim played for Science City Jena in 2013-14 and averaged 20.9 points, 5.7 assists and 1.7 steals per game. Sim joined Crailsheim Merlins in 2014 and averaged 13 points and 4.7 assists per game. In the 2015-16 season he played for Boulogne and averaged 16.9 points, 3.2 rebounds and 6.4 assists per game. In June 2016 he signed for two seasons with JL Bourg of the Pro B. He averaged 13.7 points and 4.4 assists per game in the 2017-18 season. In March 2018 he signed a two-year extension with JL Bourg.

On June 29, 2020, he has signed with Élan Chalon of LNB Pro A. Sim averaged 8.7 points, 2.5 rebounds and 2.7 assists per game. On August 22, 2021, he signed with Sigortam.net İTÜ BB of the Basketball Super League.

On August 24, 2022, he has signed with Élan Béarnais Pau-Orthez for the French Pro A.

== The Basketball Tournament ==
Garrett Sim played for Armored Athlete in the 2018 edition of The Basketball Tournament. In three games, he averaged 5.7 points, .7 assists, and 1.3 rebounds per game. Armored Athlete reached the Super 16 before falling to Boeheim's Army.
