= One, Two, Many =

2008 film by Michael DeLorenzo

- Directed by: Michael DeLorenzo
- Written by: John Melendez
- Screenplay by: John Melendez
- Story by: John Melendez
- Produced by: John Melendez
- Starring: John Melendez; Jeffrey Ross; Bellamy Young; Mark Cuban; Terryn Westbrook; Hudson Leick
- Distributed by: Virgil Films
- Release date: April 10, 2008
- Running time: 90 minutes
- Country: United States
- Language: English

One, Two, Many is a 2008 American sex comedy film released under the National Lampoon brand, written by and starring "Stuttering" John Melendez. It was directed by Michael DeLorenzo.

== Reception ==
One, Two, Many received only negative reviews from critics. In a review for DVD Talk, critic Brian Orndorf gave the film a D− stating, "The short answer is that Many is atrociously unfunny and Melendez reveals himself to be a man of zero charisma and artistic capability." DVD Verdict critic David Johnson said, "I have nothing positive to say about this release. I'm sure it will find a few fans, but One, Two, Many isn't sexy or funny or anything else." IGN's review by James Musgrove states "First and foremost, let it be known that John Melendez is a horrible actor. His thick New York accent combined with his whiny style of acting make for one of the most unlikable protagonists in recent memory. ... Melendez's style of contorting his face into bizarre expressions makes one almost cringe every time he speaks a line."
