= The Medium (1991 film) =

1991 film directed by Arthur Smith

- Directed by: Arthur Smith
- Written by: Margaret Chan; Rani Moorthy
- Produced by: Errol Pang; Derrol Stepenny Productions
- Starring: Jamie Marshall; Margaret Chan; Dore Kraus; Zhu Houren
- Release date: 1991
- Languages: English; Chinese; Malay
- Budget: S$1,840,000
- Box office: S$130,000

The Medium (also known as Medium Rare) is Singapore's first full-length English language film. It was released in 1991 and produced by Singaporean Errol Pang. It was initially supposed to be directed by a Singaporean, Tony Yeow, then by an American, Stan Barret, and finally by Arthur Smith, who was British. The Medium was initially seen as a revival of the local film industry. Starring Brenda Bakke, Margaret Chan and Dore Kraus. Zhu Houren also cameos as a coffeeshop owner whose wife ends up getting cheated by the main antagonist.

== Plot ==
The Medium is loosely based on the Toa Payoh ritual murders of 1981, and its perpetrator, Adrian Lim, with a supernatural twist to the ending. Lim murdered two children and was sentenced to death in 1988. However, in the film ending, the main character based on Adrian Lim escaped from the prison and ran into an incoming truck where Satan catches him and subjects him to eternal torture. This was said to be added to reassure the audience that crime does not pay.

== Cast ==
- Brenda Bakke
- Margaret Chan
- Dore Kraus as Daniel Wong
- Edric Hsu as Devotee

== Production ==
=== Development ===
Medium Rare was announced in November 1990 as Singapore's first locally-produced English film, with Tony Yeow serving as the film's director. Prior to Medium Rare, the Singapore film industry was in decline after Cathay-Keris Films stopped making films in 1973; investing in locally-produced films was risky as Taiwanese and Hong Kong-made films were popular. Yeow chose to base the film on the Toa Payoh ritual murders and its perpetrator, Adrian Lim, as "[their] main target is America and [Medium Rare needs] a story that is global. [Singapore's] first movie in English must have a very good story theme and it must be marketable". Before the film was produced, Yeow took the script to Puttaparthi, India, where Sathya Sai Baba "blessed" the script, prompting Pang and Yeow to produce Medium Rare. The film was expected to cost S$1.7 million (US$1.27 million), with Errol Pang, the executive producer of a company that organises international beauty pageants, funding the movie. The screenplay would be written by Australian scriptwriter Mary Lancaster. Leslie Koh, a Singaporean stage actor, was announced in February 1991 to be the assistant director, where he was to make the movie authentic. However, American director Stan Barrett became the director of Medium Rare in March; American screenwriter James Best also became the screenwriter for the film.

=== Initial casting ===
Medium Rare was to star Lim Kay Siu and Margaret Chan when it was first announced. Lim was to play Daniel Wong, a killer inspired by Adrian Lim. By January 1991, Lim backed out of his role as he was committed to TheatreWorks's Fried Rice Paradise, which was to open when filming for Medium Rare started; he stated that he only expressed interested in the role and was not committed to it. Lim was to be replaced by an Australian man with "oriental features", though Dore Kraus, who played Ultraman in Ultraman: Towards the Future, was cast for the role of Daniel Wong. Pang explained that Kraus was chosen for the role as his American nationality would appeal to the American audience while his partial Japanese heritage would add "credibility to his Singaporean role" and appeal to Asian audiences. Furthermore, Kraus was chosen as his presence "could exude an aura of charm and mystery", according to Pang. In February, The Straits Times revealed that American actress Darcy LaPier would play Daniel's second wife, a role specially created for her. LaPier took the role as she saw little risk in acting in Medium Rare, adding that "life would be unbearable if [she] didn't".

=== Filming and staff changes ===
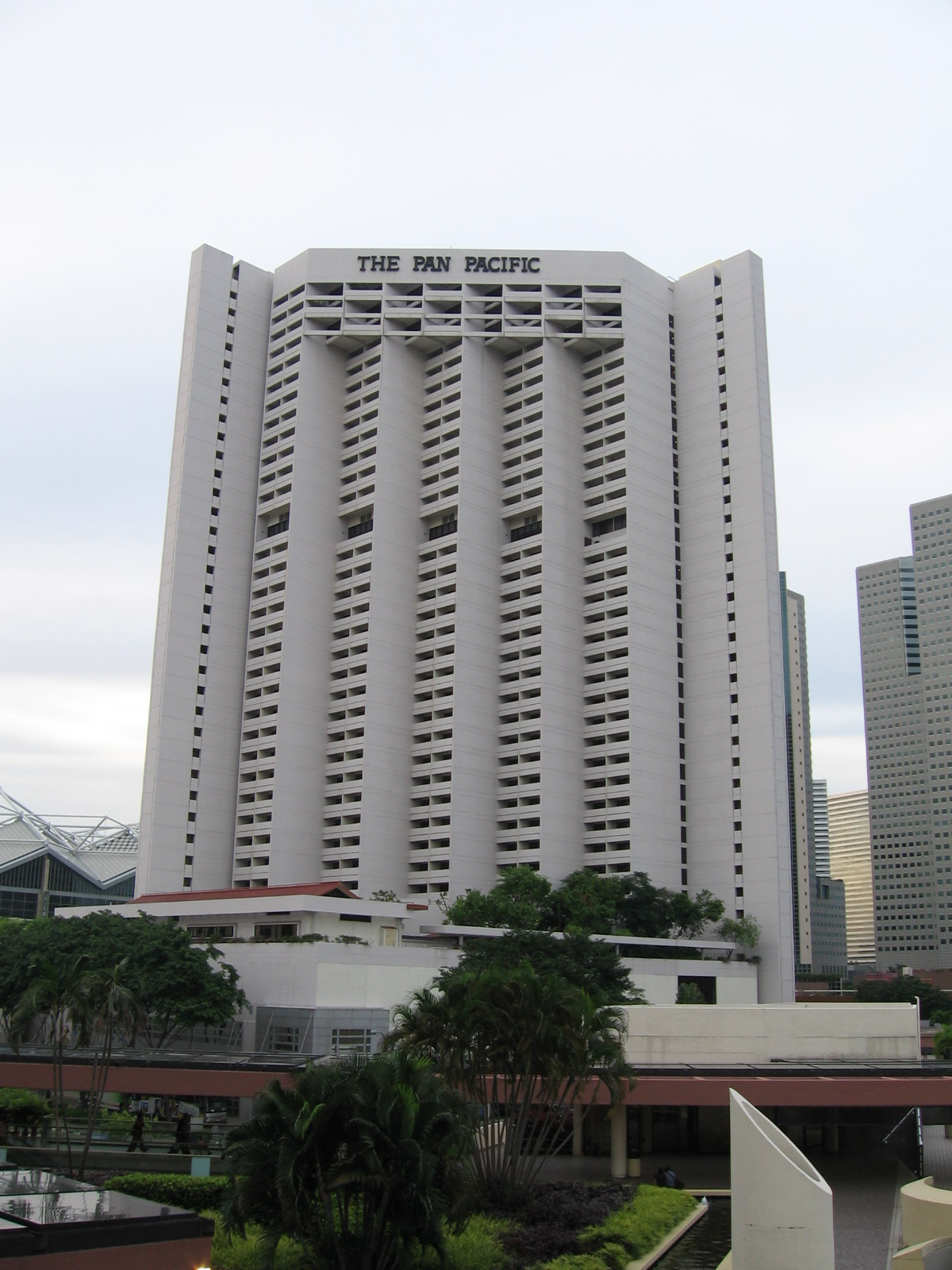
The Pan Pacific Hotel, where part of the movie was shot

When the movie was first announced, shooting was to begin after the Lunar New Year holidays, though this was moved to April 1991 as Pang wanted his staff to have a good holiday before returning to work. As announced 10 days earlier, filming for Medium Rare began on 13 April 1991. The announcement also revealed that the Economic Development Board (EDB) would back the movie. (Note: A Straits Times article published on 13 April 1991 detailed that the EDB requested the press to remove any reference to EDB supporting production; the EDB's head of public relations stated in a Straits Times article published on 30 April that the EDB's purpose is to support the emergence of a Singaporean film industry rather than backing movie projects.) However, production of the film ran into several issues. Barrett, Best, and Lapier were pulled out as according to Pang, "they were asking for Hollywood rates which [he couldn't] afford", (Note: According to Judith Holmberg of The Straits Times in a later article published in December 1991, LaPier agreed to act for free.) stating that it would have doubled the budget and delaying filming by a month. This resulted several changes for the film's staff, such as appointing Arthur Smith, the film's director of cinematography, to be the new director; Graham Moore, an Australian, as the new producer of the movie; Jamie Marshall, an American model, as LaPier's replacement; and Margaret Chan and Rani Moorthy as the new scriptwriters. Chan and Moorthy rewrote Medium Rare's script to focus on the main characters' psyche. (Note: The original script detailed a Dayak medicineman, two Caucasian women, and the drowning of Daniel Wong's Singapore wife. The original message of the film was for women not to believe in superstitions.) The rewrite took a week, with the duo often writing into the early hours of the morning; the script was finalised three days before filming began. Furthermore, two sponsors, who had pledged S$50,000 (US$37,313.43), pulled out two weeks ago; Pang was struggling to find new sponsors, so he obtained funds for the film from his family and personal sources.

In spite of these issues, filming took 45 days as expected and was conducted at various locations in Singapore, including Chinese temples like the Giok Hong Tian Temple at Havelock Road, a house at Mount Pleasant Drive, East Coast Park, a Peranakan house in Tong Watt Road, a hallway at the Singapore General Hospital's mortuary, and the Pan Pacific Hotel. According to Pang, the shooting was "plain sailing". Filming was completed on 16 May, and a press conference was held at the Pan Pacific Hotel to signify the completion of shooting along with introducing the cast of Medium Rare. Post-production of the film was to be done in Australia within the next four months. Sound production began in July and was expected to be completed in 15 weeks.

=== Release ===
Medium Rare was expected to be released in Singapore either during September or December in conjunction with school holidays. According to Julia Goh of The Straits Times, Pang and the film's crew were optimistic that Medium Rare would be successful. Pang also planned to release Medium Rare to Japan, the United States, the United Kingdom, Canada, South America, and Thailand. By June, Medium Rare was expected to be released in October in Singapore. Pang signed a deal with Cathay in September, which gave them the TV and video rights to the movie in Singapore, Brunei, and Malaysia. The film was expected to arrive to Singapore by the end of the month and was to be submitted to the Board of Film Censors; Cathay hoped to release Medium Rare under the parental guidance age rating instead of an R-rating, where viewers must be 21 years or older to view the movie. A trailer for the movie was also completed was to be shown in cinemas two weeks prior to the release of Medium Rare. A comic book adaptation of the movie, illustrated by Johnny Lau, was also produced. The film was released in Singapore by 23 November 1991 and ended up costing S$1.84 million to produce, with Pang financing S$1.2 million on his own.

== Reception ==
Medium Rare received mixed reception from viewers in Singapore. A Straits Times panel consisting of nine people rated the movie 5.5 out of 10 points. The panel praised the movie's storyline and its cast for "speaking authentically", but criticised the movie's slow plot development, lack of scare factor, and poor editing. Dave Ang of The New Paper criticised the movie's exploration of its themes, declaring that "though the subjects explored in Medium Rare are very Singaporean, they are ultimately interpreted through the eyes of a foreigner. One cannot help but feel that the film is on the whole too thin, too superficial a treatment of subjects that are rooted so deeply in the consciousness of many Singaporeans". He also stated that Medium Rare had "the ingredients of a hit film... and fails to mix these ingredients properly to cook up a palatable dish". Singapore Film Society chairman Kenneth Tan stated that although "[Medium Rare might] have its raw edges, ... it is better than those first movies produced in Hong Kong in the early days", adding that the film's use of Singlish distinguishes itself from other films and provides "an affinity" for its viewers. The Straits Times also declared that the film "[represented] a tottering step forward for Singapore cinema". The film did not break even and only earned S$130,000 in Singapore during its run, only having been screened at Cathay for 16 days.
