= Moving August =

2002 American comedy film

- Moving August DVD cover
- Directed by: Christopher Fink
- Written by: Christopher Fink; Joseph Craig
- Starring: Eddie McClintock; Sarah Wynter; Josh Holloway; Alexandra Adi
- Distributed by: District
- Release date: July 2002
- Running time: 96 minutes
- Country: United States
- Language: English

Moving August is a 2002 American comedy film directed by Christopher Fink and starring Eddie McClintock, Sarah Wynter, Josh Holloway, and Alexandra Adi.

== Plot ==
The pretty and quirky interior designer Michelle Kelly (Sarah Wynter) has convinced her struggling photographer boyfriend, August Loder (Eddie McClintock) to finally move in with her. On the same morning they're moving August out, the girl moving in mistakenly arrives to move in... she's a hot looking free-spirit named Hunter (Alexandra Adi) and August falls in love with her at first sight. August and Hunter decide to help each other move in and out. Throughout the day, their two very outrageous groups of friends tangle through conflicts and sex while August tries to decide which girl he wants to be with before it's too late.

== Cast ==
- Eddie McClintock . . . . . . August Loder
- Sarah Wynter . . . . . . Michelle Kelly
- Josh Holloway . . . . . . Loren Carol
- Alexandra Adi . . . . . . Hunter Davis
- Brenda Bakke . . . . . . Ginny Forster
- Todd Tesen . . . . . . Joe Peck
- Gavin Perry . . . . . . Adam Loder
- Christopher Fink . . . . . . Shopping Cart Guy.
