= Three Wise Guys =

Christmas-themed television film

- Genre: Christmas
- Screenplay by: Lloyd Gold
- Story by: Damon Runyon
- Directed by: Robert Iscove
- Starring: Tom Arnold; Eddie McClintock; Judd Nelson; Jodi Lyn O'Keefe; Katey Sagal; Nick Turturro
- Music by: Christopher Lennertz

Production
- Production locations: Albuquerque, NM, US
- Cinematography: Francis Kenny
- Running time: 87 minutes
- Production company: Lions Gate Television

Original release
- Network: USA Network
- Release: December 8, 2005

Three Wise Guys is a 2005 Christmas television film.

In an update on the nativity of Jesus, a pregnant woman named Mary is helped in the desert by three mobsters. The film stars Tom Arnold, Eddie McClintock, Judd Nelson, Jodi Lyn O'Keefe, Katey Sagal, and Nick Turturro.

Filming took place in Albuquerque, New Mexico. Robert Iscove directed, with a story and screenplay by Damon Runyon and Lloyd Gold, respectively. Christopher Lennertz composed the score, and Francis Kenny was the cinematographer. At 87 minutes, the Lions Gate Television-produced film was released on the USA Network at 9 p.m., December 8, 2005.

== See also ==
- List of Christmas films
