= Sunset High School (Oregon) =

Public high school in Oregon

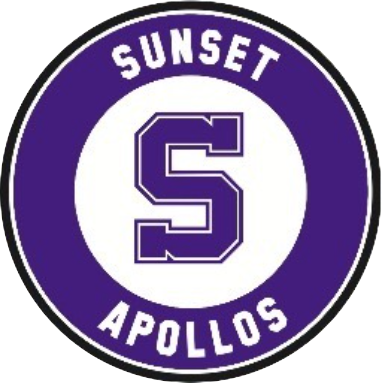

Location
- Mailing address only (school is located within the city of Beaverton, Oregon): 13840 NW Cornell Road; Portland, (Washington County), Oregon 97229; United States; 45°31′43″N 122°49′12″W

Information
- Type: Public
- Opened: January 1959; 67 years ago
- School district: Beaverton School District
- Principal: Elisa Schorr
- Teaching staff: 84.47 (FTE) (2023–2024)
- Grades: 9–12
- Enrollment: 1,879 (2023–2024)
- Student to teacher ratio: 22.24 (2023–2024)
- Campus type: Suburban
- Colors: Purple; White
- Athletics conference: OSAA Metro League 6A-2
- Team name: Apollos
- Rival: Westview High School
- Feeder schools: Meadow Park Middle School, Stoller Middle School, Tumwater Middle School
- Website: sunset.beaverton.k12.or.us
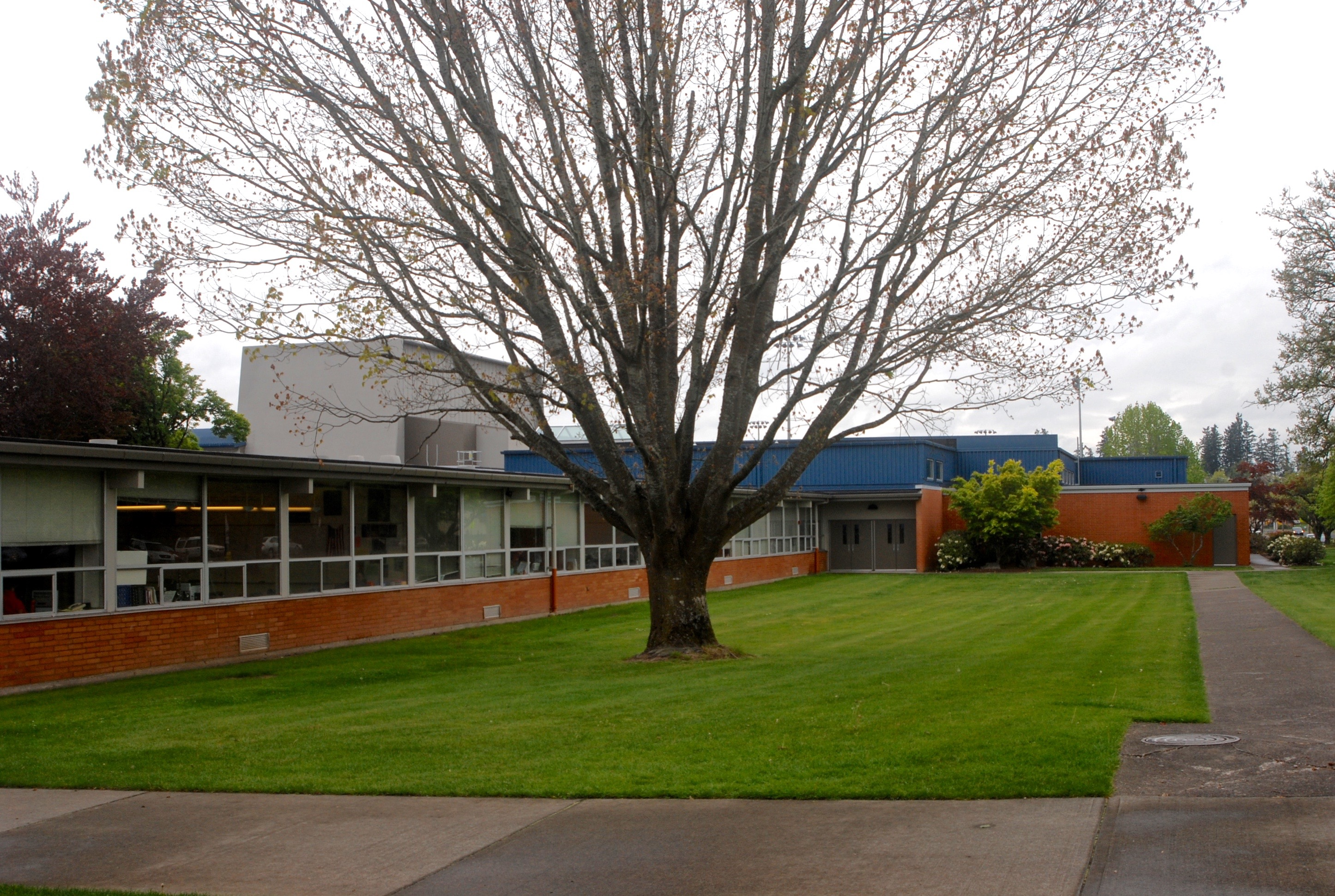
- Sunset High School in 2015

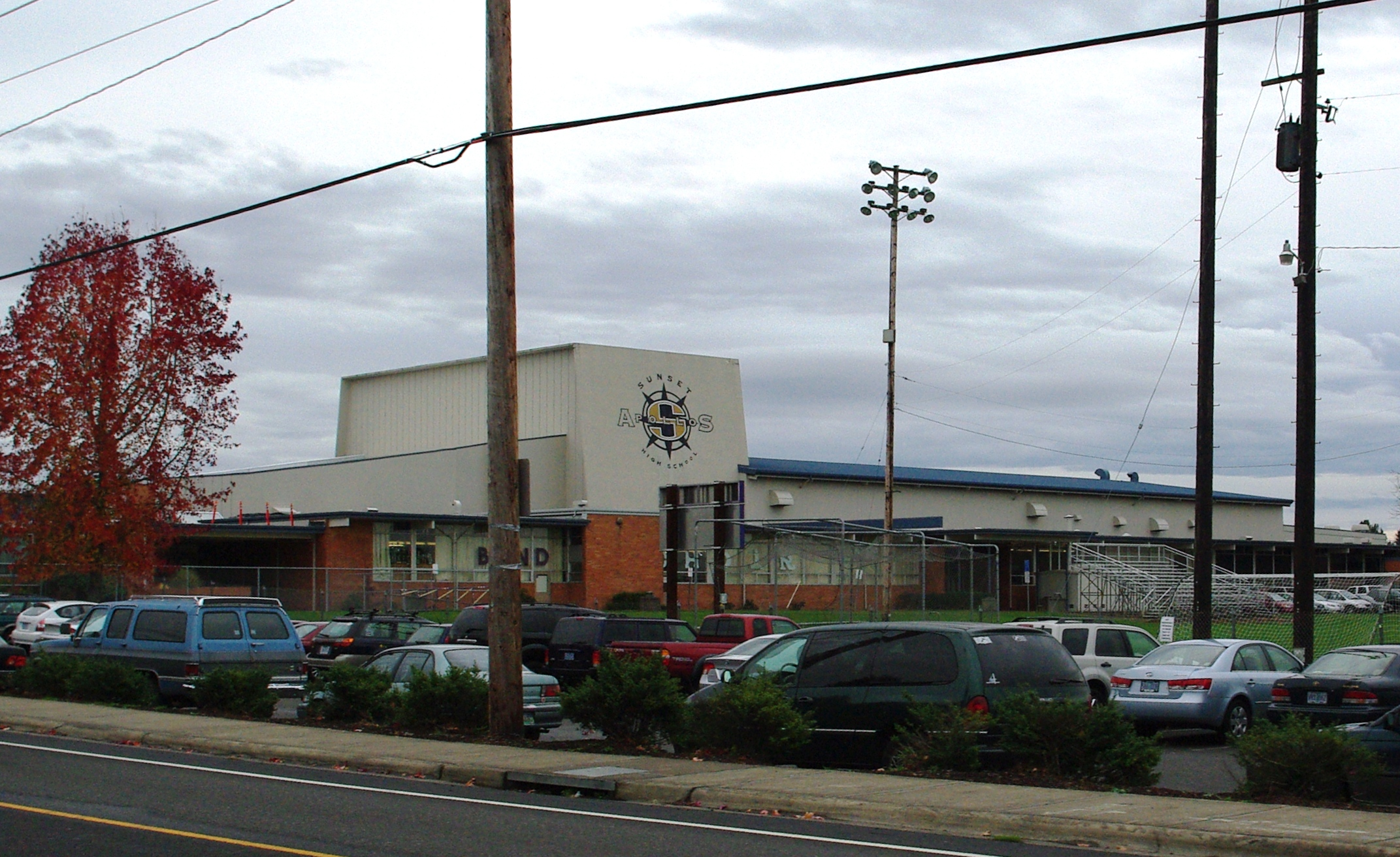
- The west side of the school in 2009
- Last updated: March 1, 2023; 3 years ago

Sunset High School (SHS) is a public high school in Beaverton, Oregon, United States. The school currently offers the International Baccalaureate Diploma Programme. It opened in 1959 and is the second oldest of the six high schools in the Beaverton School District. Sunset's athletic teams are known as the Apollos.

== History ==
The school opened in January 1959, initially with freshman and sophomore students only, adding juniors in the fall and its first senior class in September 1960.

Senator Robert F. Kennedy spoke at a student-organized mock Democratic Convention held at Sunset High School on May 17, 1968, less than three weeks before his assassination on June 5.

== Location ==
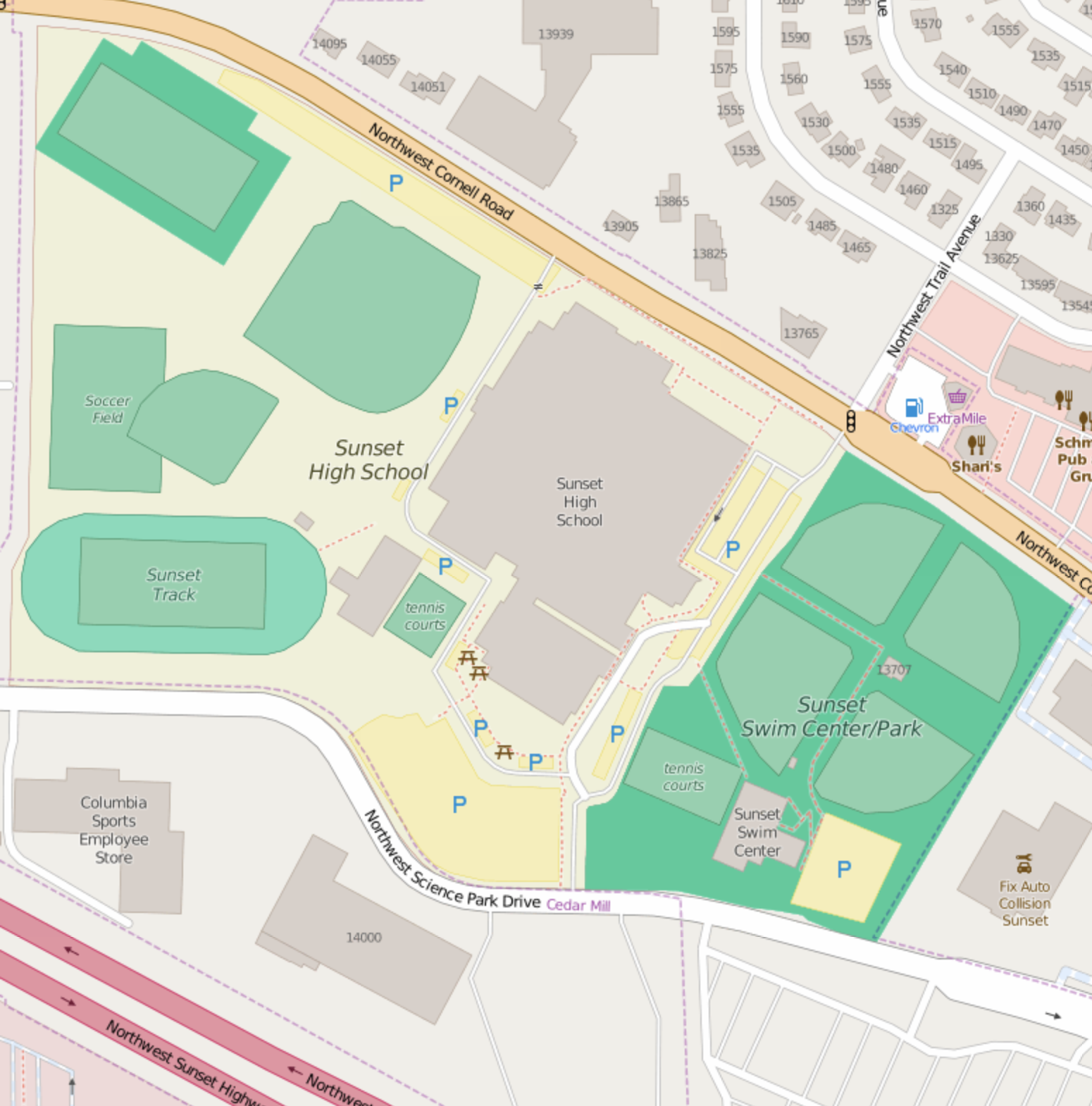
Campus map

Sunset High School is located in the predominantly unincorporated area known as Cedar Mill. Although it has always had a Portland street address, it has never actually been within the city of Portland proper. From 1959 to 1999, the school property was unincorporated land in Washington County, with it being in the Cedar Mill census-designated place as of the 1990 U.S. census. In 1999 the Sunset High School grounds (including the adjacent swimming pool) were annexed by the city of Beaverton. Nevertheless, as of 2022 the school's mailing address remains a "Portland" address, as is the case for almost all of Cedar Mill.

== Demographics ==
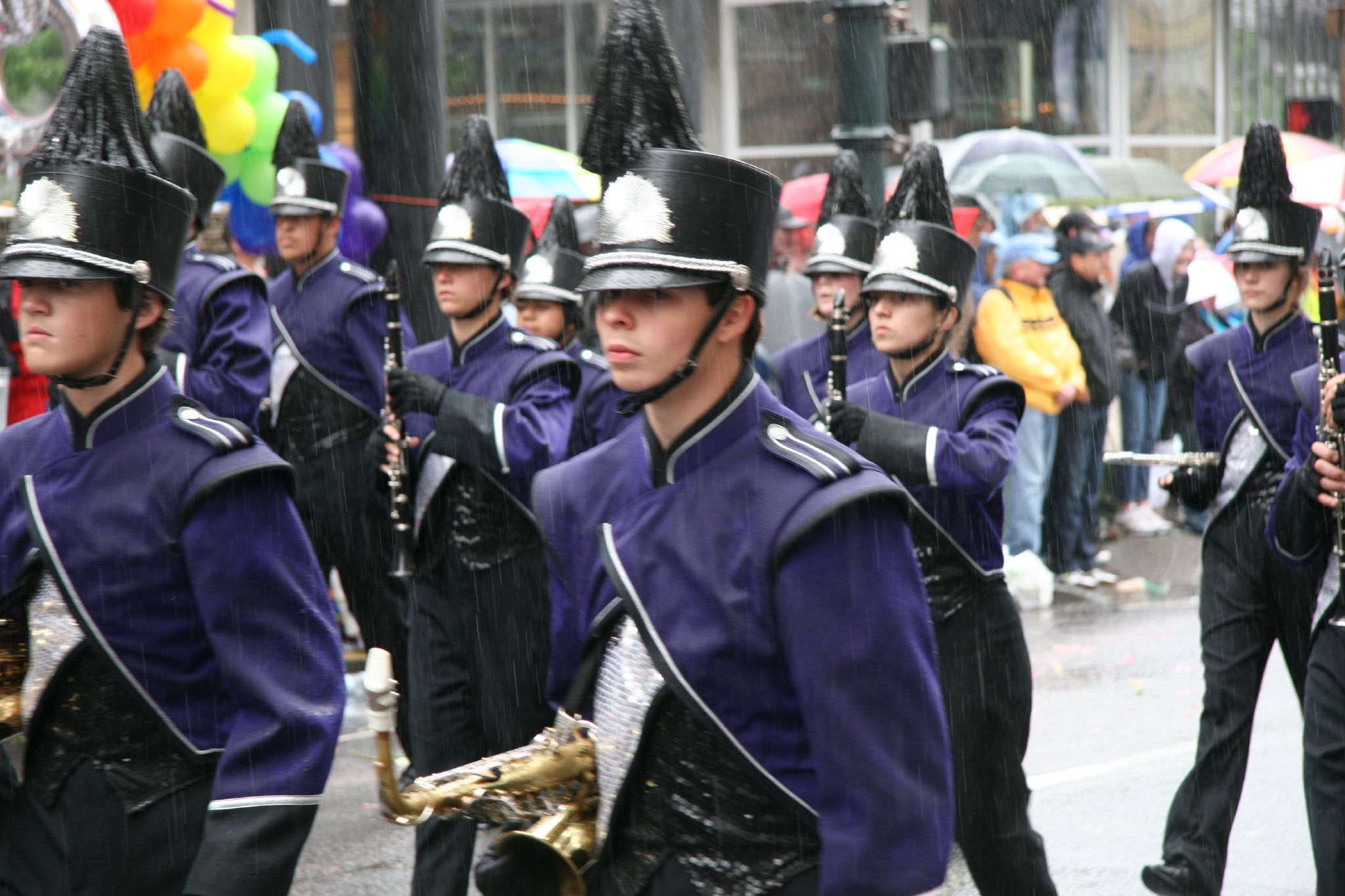
The school's marching band in 2007

As of 2021–22, 50.5% of students are white, 11.4% Hispanic or Latino, 27.3% Asian, 1.3% African American, 0.4% Native Hawaiian/Pacific Islander, 0.3% American Indian/Alaska Native, and 8.6% two or more races. The 2021–22 enrollment was 2,003.

== Academics ==
In 1983, Sunset High School was honored in the Blue Ribbon Schools Program, the highest honor a school can receive in the United States.

In 2008, 84% of the school's seniors received a high school diploma. Of 498 students, 409 graduated, 59 dropped out, five received a modified diploma, and 25 were still in high school in 2009.

== State titles ==
State championships (Oregon School Activities Association) won by Sunset High School:

- Football: 1975, 1976
- Basketball (boys): 1975, 1987
- Baseball: 1965, 1994, 2025
- Cross country (boys): 1980, 1982, 1984
- Cross country (girls): 1976, 1984, 1988, 1989, 2013, 2015
- Dance/Drill: 2014
- Golf (boys): 1986, 1990, 1993, 1994
- Speech and Debate: 2021, 2025, 2026
- Soccer (boys): 1985 (tie)
- Soccer (girls): 1990
- Swimming (boys): 1965, 2011, 2012, 2013, 2014
- Swimming (girls): 1983, 1984, 1985, 1994, 2017, 2018
- Track and field (boys): 1994, 2011
- Track and field (girls): 1977, 1978
- Tennis (boys): 1972, 1977, 1981, 1982
- Tennis (girls): 1978, 1979, 1980, 1981, 1982, 1983, 1987, 1990, 2019

== Notable alumni ==
- Brenda Bakke, actress
- Brady Clark, Major League Baseball player
- Caspar Corbeau, Dutch-American swimmer
- Tom Drougas, professional American football coach and former player
- Andrew Gregor, former professional soccer player
- Stephanie Kaza, professor emeritus of environment and natural resources
- Phil Keisling, Oregon Secretary of State
- Patrick Lachman, heavy metal guitarist and vocalist
- Susan M. Leeson, attorney and former judge
- Landen Lucas, professional basketball player
- Drew Martin, collegiate and professional basketball player
- Patrick O'Hearn, musician, composer
- E. Werner Reschke, businessman and politician
- Joe Sacco, comics artist and journalist
- Katee Sackhoff, actress
- Garrett Sim, basketball player
- Royal Skousen, professor of linguistics and English
- Randall Sullivan, author and journalist
- Courtney Taylor, singer-songwriter
- Tommy Thayer, rock guitarist, Kiss
- Aaron Woods, professional football player
- Kruz Schoolcraft, MLB pitcher drafted by the San Diego Padres
