= Cold Heart (film) =

2001 film by Dennis Dimster

- DVD cover
- Directed by: Dennis Dimster
- Written by: Zvia Dimbort; Dennis Dimster
- Produced by: Mark Boot; Boaz Davidson; Zvia Dimbort; Scott Putman
- Starring: Nastassja Kinski; Jeff Fahey; Josh Holloway
- Production company: Nu Image
- Distributed by: Filmexperiment Company
- Release date: February 10, 2001
- Running time: 95 minutes
- Country: United States
- Language: English

Cold Heart is a 2001 erotic thriller film starring Nastassja Kinski and Jeff Fahey. The film conveys the atmosphere of conspiracy, the essence of which becomes clear to an innocent victim at the very last moment.

== Plot ==
Dangerous psychopath Sean Clark tries to kill a woman and gets into a prison psychiatric hospital. Thanks to the efforts of a talented psychiatrist Dr. Phil Davis, Clark is released prematurely. Davis explains that he acts on behalf of Sean's father but mentions that his father does not want to meet or communicate with Sean. Davis gives Clark money and takes him to his new home, reminding that the main condition for the Sean's release is his weekly visits to Davis.

After that, Sean starts a new life. He gets a job with a large company, the owner of which turns out to be Davis's wife, Linda, who falls in love with Sean. In turn, Sean performs her every wish and even says to Davis that he loves his new employer.

Meanwhile, Linda suspects that her husband has an extramarital affair. Secretive phone calls, leavings for conferences (which he does not attend)—all of this convince her that she is right. One day, Linda plans to attend the presentation of her film. Her assistant, who was to accompany her, proposes to replace her with Sean. On a trip, a whirlwind romance sparks between Linda and Sean. Blinded by passion, Linda cannot suspect that all the events are the parts of her husband's insidious plan. He wants to profit from her death and chooses the most reliable weapon—a convicted maniac, whose guilt no one will doubt.

== Cast ==
- Nastassja Kinski as Linda Cross
- Jeff Fahey as Dr. Phil Davis
- Josh Holloway as Sean Clark
- Hudson Leick as Julia
- Janne Campbell as Natalie
- Lincoln Myerson as Mr. Peterson
- Bob Sattler as Detective Harris
