= Aaron Woods (gridiron football) =

American football player and coach (born 1986)

No. 83, 14
- Position: Slotback / Wide receiver / Return specialist

Personal information
- Born: August 5, 1986 (age 40); Portland, Oregon
- Listed height: 5 ft 6 in (1.68 m)
- Listed weight: 181 lb (82 kg)

Career information
- High school: Sunset High School
- College: Portland State
- NFL draft: 2010: undrafted

Career history

Playing
- Sacramento Mountain Lions (2010–2011); Las Vegas Locomotives (2012); Winnipeg Blue Bombers (2013–2014)

Coaching
- Westview High School (Portland, Oregon) (2017–2022) Head strength and conditioning coach; Sunset High School (Portland, Oregon) (2026–Present) Head strength and conditioning coach

Awards and highlights
- 2011 UFL special teams player of the year
- Stats at CFL.ca (archive)

Aaron Woods (born August 5, 1986) is a high school football coach and a former professional American and Canadian football player. Woods spent 2010 through 2012 playing in the United Football League for the Sacramento Mountain Lions and Las Vegas Locomotives. He played college football at Santa Rosa Junior College, and Portland State. He played high school football at Sunset High School in Beaverton, Oregon.

== College career ==
After playing at Santa Rosa Junior College, Woods transferred to Portland State in 2007. In 2008, Woods had 1,028 receiving yards and a school record 908 kickoff return yards, breaking Shaun Bodiford's record of 724 kickoff return yards in 2005. In 2009, Woods broke his own record with 1,314 kickoff return yards. Woods also holds the record for career kickoff return yards with 2,222, breaking Orshawante Bryant's 1806.

== Professional career ==
=== UFL ===
Woods played for the Sacramento Mountain Lions in 2010 and 2011. In 2011, he was named the UFL's special teams player of the year after leading the league with a 23.6-yard kickoff-return average. Woods played for the Las Vegas Locomotives in 2012.

=== CFL ===
Woods signed with the Winnipeg Blue Bombers on July 8, 2013. Woods was injured on September 1 and missed the rest of the 2013 season. He was released by the Blue Bombers on November 2, 2014.

== Personal life ==
Woods is the owner of Grind Time Fit in Beaverton, Oregon. He is married and has a son.
