= After the Game =

- Directed by: Brewster MacWilliams
- Written by: Brewster MacWilliams
- Produced by: Robert Peters; Roy Winnick
- Starring: Frank Gorshin; Stanley DeSantis; Sam Anderson; Mike Genovese; Susan Traylor; Robert Dubac
- Cinematography: Arturo Smith
- Music by: Colin Leese
- Release date: 1997
- Running time: 89 minutes
- Country: United States
- Language: English

After the Game (released in some countries as The Last Hand) is a 1997 neo-noir drama/mystery film directed by Brewster MacWilliams and starring Frank Gorshin, Stanley DeSantis, Sam Anderson, Mike Genovese, Susan Traylor, and Robert Dubac. It is produced by Robert Peters and Roy Winnick. The screenplay was written by Brewster MacWilliams.

The film explores the themes of poker, revenge, deceit, lust and greed, and explores karma and the afterlife.

The DVD, titled The Last Hand, was issued in 2004.

== Plot ==
Aging gambler Benny Walsh dies in a suspicious car crash after the biggest poker win of his life. His son Clyde comes to the Nevada town in search of answers. He discovers that each of his father's gambling buddies had ample reason to want him dead.

== Cast ==
- Frank Gorshin as Benny Walsh
- Stanley DeSantis as Frank Bertini
- Sam Anderson as Jimmy Walsh
- Mike Genovese as Sam Kowalski
- Susan Traylor as Veronica Kowalski
- Richard Lineback as Slim, the Bartender
- Donna Eskra as Dolly
- Robert Dubac as Clyde Walsh
- Lou Rawls as Morgue Attendant
- Daniel Zacapa as Detective Garcia
- Hudson Leick as Grace
