= Brenda Bakke =

American actress (born 1963)

- Born: May 15, 1963 (age 63); Klamath Falls, Oregon, U.S.
- Occupation: Actress
- Years active: 1986–present
- Website: brendabakke.com

Brenda Jean Bakke (born May 15, 1963) is an American actress, best known for her roles in 1990s films Hot Shots! Part Deux, Gunmen, Demon Knight, Under Siege 2: Dark Territory, and L.A. Confidential.

== Life and career ==
Bakke was born in Klamath Falls, Oregon, and began her acting career in a Portland stage production of Years Ago at age 15. After graduating in 1981 from Sunset High School, near Beaverton, Oregon, she moved to Los Angeles to study acting at the American Academy of Dramatic Arts. She made her screen debut in the 1986 movie Hardbodies 2, and the following year, guest starred in the episode "Justice" of Star Trek: The Next Generation. In later years, she had a number of roles in low-budget films, such as Gunhed, Solar Crisis and The Medium.

In 1993, Bakke appeared in the comedy film Hot Shots! Part Deux as Michelle Huddleston, the love interest of Charlie Sheen. The following year, she played the female leading role in the action-comedy film, Gunmen. In 1995, she appeared as Cordelia the prostitute in Ernest Dickerson's Demon Knight, and as Captain Linda Gilder in Under Siege 2.

During the 1995-96 television season, she was a regular cast member in the CBS horror series, American Gothic alongside Gary Cole. In 1997, Bakke appeared as Lana Turner in the neo-noir mystery crime film, L.A. Confidential. In 1999, she returned to television with the role of the lead character's mother in the short-lived Fox drama series, Ryan Caulfield: Year One.

In the 2000s, Bakke continued playing roles in smaller movies, such as The Quickie and Moving August. She spent the following years guest starring in episodes of CSI: Crime Scene Investigation, NYPD Blue, The Mentalist, and Supernatural. In 2015, she began appearing in the recurring role of Virginia in the Oprah Winfrey Network prime time soap opera If Loving You Is Wrong. In 2016, Bakke guest starred in episodes of Heartbeat and Criminal Minds: Beyond Borders.

== Filmography ==
=== Film ===
Year	Title	Role	Notes
1986	Last Resort	Veroneeka	
1986	Hardbodies 2	Morgan	
1987	Scavengers	Kimberly Blake	
1987	Medium Rare		
1988	Fast Gun	Julie Comstock	
1988	A Father's Homecoming	Nurse Pitzer	Television film
1988	Dangerous Love	Chris	
1989	Fist Fighter	Ellen	
1989	Nowhere to Run	Joannie	
1989	Another Chance	Sandy	
1989	Gunhed	Texas Air Ranger Sergeant Nim	
1989	Death Spa	Laura Danvers	
1990	Stolen: One Husband	Samantha	Television film
1990	Solar Crisis	Dr. Claire Beeson	
1992	The Medium		
1992	Secrets	Sandy Warwick	Television film
1993	Hot Shots! Part Deux	Michelle Rodham Huddleston	
1994	Gunmen	Maria	
1994	Twogether	Allison McKenzie	
1994	Terminal Voyage	Zinovitz	
1995	Tales from the Crypt: Demon Knight	Cordelia	
1995	Under Siege 2: Dark Territory	Captain Linda Gilder	
1995	Lone Justice 2	Wren	
1996	Lone Justice 3	Wren	
1996	Frame by Frame		
1997	L.A. Confidential	Lana Turner	
1997	Trucks	Hope Gladstone	
1998	Shelter	Helena	
1998	The Fixer	C.J.	Television film
1998	Nobody Lives Forever	Laurel Trevelyn	Television film
2000	Warm Texas Rain	Kim	
2000	Time Loves a Hero	Alice	Short film
2001	The Quickie	Jane	
2002	Moving August	Ginny Forster	
2002	Groom Lake	Joyce	
2004	Hot Rush	Old Lady	Short film
2004	Leave No Trace	Victoria Blake	
2015	There	LLM	
2015	Unbelievable!!!!!	Nurse Christine Choppel	
2017	Juvenile	Margarette	
2018	Foster Boy	Linda Ryan	

=== Television ===
Year	Title	Role	Notes
1987	Star Trek: The Next Generation	Rivan	Episode: "Justice"
1987—1988	High Mountain Rangers		Episodes: "Pilot" and "Russian Skier Defects"
1990	Father Dowling Mysteries	Claudia Marshall	Episode: "The Showgirl Mystery"
1991	The Young Riders	Alice	Episode: "The Peacemakers"
1992	Jake and the Fatman	Lori Menza	Episode: "Come Closer to Me"
1993	Ned Blessing: The True Story of My Life	Wren	Miniseries
1994	Second Chances	Lara Peterson	Episodes: "Miss Friendly Santa Rita" and "Justifiable Jealousy"
1994	The Adventures of Brisco County, Jr.	Frances McCabe	Episode: "Ned Zed"
1995—1996	American Gothic	Selena Coombs	Series regular, 18 episodes
1997	Trucks	Hope Gladstone	TV movie
1999	Ryan Caulfield: Year One	Mrs. Caulfield	Series regular, 8 episodes
1999	Charmed	Soul Collector	Episode: "The Power of Two"
2001	Popular	Mary Lou Parker	Episodes: "Miss Friendly Santa Rita" and "It's Greek to Me"
2001	Dark Angel	Dr. Adriana Vertes	Episode: "Female Trouble"
2001	CSI: Crime Scene Investigation	Bonnie Ritten	Episode: "Burked"
2004	NYPD Blue	Claudia Weintraub	Episode: "I Love My Wives, But Oh You Kid"
2009	Dollhouse	Margaret Bashford	Episode: "Haunted"
2010	The Mentalist	Detective Sharon Florey	Episode: "Blood in, Blood Out"
2010	Dark Blue	Ana Perry	Episode: "Dead Flowers"
2014	The Bridge	Guard	Episode: "Eye of the Deep"
2015	Supernatural	Suzie	Episode: "The Werther Project"
2015-2017	If Loving You Is Wrong	Virginia	Recurring role, 9 episodes
2016	Criminal Minds: Beyond Borders	Camille	Episode: "Iqiniso"
2016	Heartbeat	Marie	Episode: "Match Game"
2017-2018	Colony	Swiss Chancellor	Episodes: "Panopticon" and "Puzzle Man"
2017	Grey's Anatomy	Gwen Nolan	Episode: "Back Where You Belong"
2019	What/If	Older Laura	Episodes: "What Remains" and "WTF"
