= Miracle at Manchester =

2022 film by Eddie McClintock

- Poster
- Directed by: Eddie McClintock
- Written by: Jason Campbell
- Produced by: Jason Campbell
- Starring: Eddie McClintock; Dean Cain; Daniel Roebuck; Kory Getman
- Cinematography: Matt Ruby
- Edited by: Daniel Fajardo
- Music by: Emmanuel Segarra
- Production company: JC Films
- Distributed by: Bridgestone Multimedia
- Release dates: December 3, 2022 (San Diego, California); April 4, 2023 (Video on demand)
- Running time: 87 minutes
- Country: United States
- Language: English
- Budget: $125,000

Miracle at Manchester is a 2022 American family drama film directed by Eddie McClintock and written by Jason Campbell. The film stars McClintock, Dean Cain, Daniel Roebuck and Kory Getman. The film is based on an allegedly true story from 2015 about Brycen Newman's brain cancer diagnosis and recovery at Cathedral Catholic High School.

== Plot ==
A teen battling aggressive brain cancer helps restore his father's faith when his healing journey becomes the story of miracles.

== Cast ==
- Eddie McClintock as Richard Newman
- Dean Cain as Dr. Getty
- Daniel Roebuck as Ed Hanson
- Kory Getman as Brycen Newman
- Kathy Patterson as Marilyn Hanson
- Ellie Mae Louise Smith as Grace Miles
- Lauren Owens as Riley
- Kurt Boyd as Kurt
- Thomas Peterson as Marcus
- Breanna Laureti as Lucy
- Nick Avila as Miles Himmel

== Production ==
The film is based on a 2015 true story in which Cathedral Catholic High School sophomore Brycen Newman survived brain cancer. Principal photography was taken in San Diego in April 2022, with much of it on location at Cathedral Catholic High School.

== Release ==
The film premiered on December 3, 2022, in San Diego, California. It was released on DVD and streaming April 4, 2023, by Bridgestone Multimedia and Allied Vaughn.

== Reception ==
Richard Propes at The Independent Critic graded the film a 3.5 out of 4. Hosea Rupprecht at Pauline Center for Media Studies said what impressed them was "Brycen's good spirits and generosity even as he faces setback after setback." Cooper Dowd at Movie Guide said it had some light violence, but scored it 3 out of 4 for its entertainment quality. The Dove approved it for those 12 and up, saying "It's a wonderful faith-based film which pays off nicely." Emily Tsiao at The Plugged In Show said that the "story is an inspiring reminder of what can happen when Christians put their trust in God—a God who is still in the business of performing miracles."

== Lawsuit ==
On July 7, 2025, Brycen Newman, Richard Newman and the Miracle Children's Foundation filed a federal lawsuit in the Southern District of California with 21 allegations (including copyright infringement, misappropriation of name, breach of contract and fraud) in the filing against the producer JC Films and affiliate companies, Jason Campbell and Heather Mudrick-Campbell, along with the distributor BMG Global.
