= The Attentive Heart =

1996 book by Stephanie Kaza

The Attentive Heart: Conversations with Trees
- Author: Stephanie Kaza
- Publication date: 1996

The Attentive Heart: Conversations with Trees is a 1996 book written by Stephanie Kaza. The book depicts spiritual themes. The spirits contacted are resident in species not observed to speak in the ordinary biophysical sense of human speech. A second edition of the book was published in April, 2019, titled Conversations With Trees: An Intimate Ecology, by Shambhala Publications. Stephanie Kaza was a professor of environmental studies at the University of Vermont, where she taught religion and ecology, environmental justice, ecofeminism, radical environmentalism and unlearning consumerism.

== See also ==
- Theophany
