= Stephanie Kaza =

Stephanie Kaza is Professor Emeritus in the Rubenstein School of Environment and Natural Resources at the University of Vermont (UVM). She is a writer, a practicing Soto Zen Buddhist, and an active proponent of religious dialogue. She taught religion and ecology. She combines an academic background in science, education, and theology in her writing, which is often categorized under the term spiritual ecology. After 24 years at UVM, she retired in 2015.

== Education ==
Stephanie Kaza attended Sunset High School in Portland, Oregon, where she graduated in 1964. She went on to Oberlin College for a BA in biology and the Stanford Graduate School of Education for an M.A. in education, finishing in 1968 and 1970 respectively. Kaza earned her PhD in biology at the University of California, Santa Cruz in 1979. In 1991, Kaza finished work at the Starr King School for the Ministry, earning a Master of Divinity degree. She studied with Thich Nhat Hanh and Joanna Macy.

== Career ==
Kaza has worked as a high school, community college, and university teacher. She has been a lecturer, instructor for the Sierra Wilderness Institute, education director for the Point Reyes Bird Observatory, and education coordinator at the University of California Botanical Garden. Kaza began her work at the University of Vermont (UVM) in 1991 as an assistant professor and became a full professor in 2005.

At UVM, she taught both undergraduate and graduate students in the field of environmental humanities, which comprises religion and ecology, environmental justice, American nature philosophers, issues of race and culture in natural resources, ecofeminism, and issues related to consumerism.

In February 2016, she was named one of five recipients of a Retired Scholars Award at UVM for the 2015-16 academic year.

Outside the academic walls of UVM, Kaza serves as president of the Society for Buddhist-Christian Studies. She participates in the Religion and Ecology group of the American Academy of Religion. She writes a regular ecology column for Turning Wheel, the journal of the Buddhist Peace Fellowship.

== Personal life ==
Upon retiring, Kaza returned to her hometown of Portland, Oregon with her husband, artist Davis TeSelle. She remains active in local environmental issues.

== Selected works ==
=== Books ===
- Kaza, Stephanie. The Attentive Heart: Conversations with Trees (Fawcett, 1993). ISBN 0-449-90779-1
- Kaza, Stephanie, and Kenneth Kraft, eds. Dharma Rain (Shambhala, 2000). ISBN 1-57062-475-5
- Kaza, Stephanie, ed. Hooked!: Buddhist Writings on Greed, Desire, and the Urge to Consume (Shambhala, 2005). ISBN 1-59030-172-2
- Kaza, Stephanie. Mindfully Green: A Personal and Spiritual Guide to Whole Earth Thinking (Shambhala, 2008). ISBN 978-1-59030-583-6
- LeBouef, Burney J. and Stephanie Kaza, eds. Natural History of Ano Nuevo (Boxwood Press, 1981). ISBN 0-910286-77-9

=== Articles online ===
- Acting with Compassion
- The Attentive Heart
- A Buddhist Response to Paul Ingram
- A Community of Attention
- Kaza's Collection of Articles
