= Knight Rider season 2 =

Season of the 1980s television series Knight Rider

Knight Rider
- Season 2
- DVD cover
- No. of episodes: 24

Release
- Original network: NBC
- Original release: October 2, 1983 – May 27, 1984

Season chronology
- ← Previous; Season 1 Next → Season 3

The second season of Knight Rider, an American television series, began October 2, 1983, and ended on May 27, 1984, airing on NBC. The region 1 DVD was released on April 12, 2005.

In season two, Patricia McPherson who played Bonnie Barstow, departed the show and was replaced by Rebecca Holden as April Curtis, the new technician for KITT. April was written out after Holden left the show at the end of season two, and McPherson returned for season three until the show ended.

== Cast ==
- David Hasselhoff as Michael Knight and Garthe Knight
- William Daniels as the voice of KITT (Knight Industries Two Thousand) (uncredited)
- Edward Mulhare as Devon Miles
- Rebecca Holden as April Curtis
- Richard Basehart as voice of Wilton Knight

== Episodes ==
No. overall	No. in season	Title	Directed by	Written by	Original release date	Prod. code
23	1	"Goliath"	Winrich Kolbe	Robert Foster & Robert W. Gilmer	October 2, 1983	57875
24	2	"Goliath"	Winrich Kolbe	Robert Foster & Robert W. Gilmer	October 2, 1983	57876
Michael goes to Las Vegas to help a woman named Rita Wilcox, whose brother has gone missing. Elsewhere, Devon has a meeting with Elizabeth Knight, Wilton Knights widow, who remains involved with funding the Foundation, although Devon distrusts her motives. Michael is shocked to learn of the existence of Wilton & Elizabeth's son, Garthe, who is plotting with his mother to steal the formula for KITT's molecular bonded shell. He's managed to escape from an African prison and has settled in Las Vegas. Things get more complicated when Michael learns Rita is also involved with Garthe, and her brother was conducting some kind of investigation on him. Michael uncovers her brother's audio tapes containing information on a place known as "Red Bluff", a classified weapons storage facility deep in the Nevada desert. Red Bluff currently holds a collection of tactical missiles which would be dangerous in the wrong hands, especially a third world nation. When Michael learns Garthe is secretly meeting with an African military general named Tsombe Kuna, the pieces come together. Just how Garthe intends on getting the missiles out of the highly guarded facility isn't certain; that is until Michael comes face-to-face with a massive semi truck known as "Goliath" which is protected with the same indestructible molecular bonded shell technology as KITT. Garthe shows Michael just how unstoppable Goliath is, when he lures Michael to a dry lake for a showdown. Goliath easily clobbers KITT in a collision that nearly destroys him. April repairs KITT and installs a powerful laser weapon which may give him an edge against Goliath. In anger, Garthe chases Michael down in his Mercedes, but Michael lures him into a trap where Devon and April hold him hostage. Michael then poses as Garthe to fetch Rita from the casino, and intercept Goliath before General Kuna uses it to break into Red Bluff. In the meantime, Garthe manages to escape and rushes to stop Michael before he can plant a bomb on Goliath. A squad of Kuna's soldiers then load the missiles into Goliath's trailer. Michael isn't finished yet, and has KITT cause a disturbance so he can slip away. Back inside KITT, Michael chases down Garthe to confront him in a final showdown before Kuna can take possession of the weapons.: Note: Originally shown as a feature-length episode, which was later cut into two separate episodes for syndication.; David Hasselhoff plays both Michael and Garthe Knight in a dual role.; Features the first appearance of Rebecca Holden as April Curtis, replacing Patricia McPherson's Bonnie Barstow. No explanation is given for the change.
25	3	"Brother's Keeper"	Sidney Hayers	E.F. Wallengren	October 9, 1983	57805
Michael infiltrates a maximum security prison to spring a convict named Peter McCord, who is terrified to leave the big house, and even turns down his parole. Police investigator Philip Hunt (Tim O'Connor), however, wants him released so he can draw out a former mob boss, Eric Fenton, who has a personal vendetta against McCord. Fenton threatens to explode a powerful bomb hidden somewhere in the city if McCord is not handed over, but McCord manages to get away when Hunt's officers drop him off for Fenton's thugs. Michael goes looking for McCord and his only lead is his estranged daughter, Lisa, who refuses to even speak to her father believing he murdered her mother Rachel. Once McCord is found, he confronts Lisa and claims his innocence, saying Fenton murdered Rachel, who had also been Fenton's lover for a time before the mobster was sent to prison. By the time Fenton was released, he found Rachel and McCord had married and was furious. Now McCord must prove himself to his daughter and help Michael bring Fenton down, find the bomb with only minutes left before detonation.
26	4	"Merchants of Death"	Alan Myerson	William Schmidt	October 16, 1983	57807
Michael goes to Phoenix to investigate the disappearance of Amelia Clermont, a private investigator and a former love interest of Devon. Michael and Camela, Amelia's daughter, search for clues in her mother's personal files and discover a diagram of a weapon guidance computer and photos of an army surplus yard owned by a man named Strock (Dana Elcar). Strock is also involved in funding a re-election campaign for Congressman Albert Ebersol. In a ravine near the facility, Michael finds the gruesome remains of Amelia's burned out car. KITT determines the car was destroyed by a rocket fired from the air. Devon informs Michael that the schematics are for a rocket called the "Sledgehammer", which is the main armament for an experimental helicopter known as the "SX411". Michael sneaks into the surplus yard and finds the helicopter. He believes the facility is a front for the sale of illegal weapons, and the money is being funneled to Ebersol. The next morning, Devon and the police raid the facility, but find it empty. Strock feigns ignorance and there is no evidence to bring him in.
27	5	"Blind Spot"	Bernard L. Kowalski	Jackson Gillis	October 23, 1983	57809
The Foundation receives a strange phone call from a migrant worker at a wrecking yard who claims the owner is exploiting illegal immigrants as slave labor, and who murdered one who opposed him. The caller only wants to make an evidence drop and prefers to remain anonymous. Michael goes to fetch the evidence at a shopping mall parking lot and keeps an eye out for the tipster. Two gunmen show up and shoot a man they believe to be the snitch, then escape in a Porsche. The victim, however, is an innocent bystander, John; the boyfriend of a blind woman named Julie Robinson. The gunmen first see Julie with her guide dog and are relieved that she can't identify them by sight. Michael proposes that she goes driving with KITT, and make them think she can see, to entrap them. Julie also identifies the caller by hearing his voice on KITT's recording. But the crooks make her their next target. Michael must now protect Julie, who is caught up in a situation she had nothing to do with, and expose the ruthless businessman behind the shooting.
28	6	"Return to Cadiz"	Alan Myerson	Story by : Larry Forrester; Teleplay by : Sonny Mathias	October 30, 1983	57801
Michael goes to a beach to test KITT's new "Aquatic Synthesizer" which allows him to drive on water. He aborts the test when KITT discovers a body of a young diver named Bobby Shell who is alive but suffering from the bends. Michael rushes him to a hospital where he meets his sister, Jennifer (Anne Lockhart). Michael looks over the boy's diving gear which has clearly been sabotaged, and also finds a solid gold Aztec coin. Michael further investigates down at the shore and discovers the fishing vessel Fin Quest, which is supposed to be part of an aquatic research project, is captained by a man named Zachary Sloate, a ruthless treasure hunter. After another attempt is made on Bobby's life, Bobby confesses that he had found Nacinda while diving, and hid it in a secret place called "Cadiz". Michael knows Sloate is willing to kill to get Nacinda, and the situation intensifies once he learns Jennifer has been kidnapped.
29	7	"K.I.T.T. the Cat"	Jeffrey Hayden	Janis Hendler	November 6, 1983	57824
Michael investigates a series of cat burglaries, the most recent, the theft of a priceless ruby necklace. The burglar leaves a calling card behind and Devon indicates he was once robbed by a thief with a similar MO named Raymond Fallon; although he was never caught. Devon also mentions Fallon was killed in a plane crash a month earlier so it couldn't possibly be the same thief. This burglar happens to only be stealing from other criminals and they don't report the thefts to authorities. Michael wonders if Fallon taught his criminal trade to someone else and suspects Fallon's daughter, Grace (Geena Davis). Grace admits she in fact trained with her father, but she is not responsible for the recent thefts. Michael soon crosses paths with a trigger-happy police detective, George Barth (Jack Starrett), who suspects Grace and is revealed to have personal vendetta against her. He failed at catching her father and now that the master thief is dead, he is determined to catch his daughter in the act. Michael and Grace must now dodge Barth and plan a trap to catch the real thief.
30	8	"Custom K.I.T.T."	Georg Fenady	Story by : William Schmidt & Robert Specht; Teleplay by : William Schmidt	November 13, 1983	57821
A rare and priceless car, "The Pennington Ascot Regency", is stolen from Devon who was borrowing it from an old friend, Commander Smythe. Devon wants the car found before his friend gives him an earful. Michael goes to the only place nearby that such an exotic vehicle could be sold, the "Barton Springs Custom Classic Show". There, Michael meets Carrie Haver, a young woman trying to win a trophy for her deceased father's exotic car, but Carrie is being strongly urged by the show coordinator, Suzanne Weston, into selling it to her. When Carrie's car gets stolen, Michael immediately suspects Weston who has a criminal background, but trailing her doesn't lead to the stolen vehicles. Michael's next plan is to decorate KITT with a flame job, gold rimmed racing wheels and a huge spoiler in an attempt to draw out the real car thieves. Guest cast: Rebecca Holden as April Curtis, Denise Miller as Carrie Haver, Melinda O. Fee as Suzanne Weston, Angel Tompkins as Nora Rayburn, Bernard Fox as Commander Smythe, Michael Huddleston as Hector, Albert Salmi as Buck Rayburn, Brian Cutler as Dobie, and Robert Pastorelli as Leroy.
31	9	"Soul Survivor"	Harvey Laidman	Robert Foster & Robert W. Gilmer	November 27, 1983	57829
Michael stops to help a woman whose car has broken down, and after rendering aid, the woman insists he join her for a drink at her home. There, she mesmerizes him with strange music while outside, a kid named Randy Merritt (Brian Robbins) in a pest control van full of computer equipment hacks into KITT's systems. Michael later awakens at the side of the road. He and Devon return to the woman's house and find it completely empty, but KITT's AI module is found in the garbage. April restores what is left of KITT and temporarily installs him in a portable television set. Michael borrows Devon's Mercedes to look for Randy Merrit, a young whiz kid who Michael suspects to be the hacker. His only lead is Randy's worried mother who explains the boy has had relations with a strange woman named Adrianne Margeaux (Ann Turkel).
32	10	"Ring of Fire"	Winrich Kolbe	Janis Hendler	December 4, 1983	57810
April and Michael abort the test of KITT's new "pyroclastic lamination" (which will protect him from sustained heat up to 800 degrees), when Devon interrupts and gives Michael a tape recording of a distressed Cajun woman named Lela Callan. Lela is afraid her murderous ex-husband Cray, who has just escaped from a Louisiana chain gang, may try to kill her for testifying against him at his trial. Michael goes to the bayou to investigate and soon meets a reverend who says he sent the tape. The reverend is then shot by Cray and Michael gives chase, but KITT has an unexpected systems malfunction and becomes stuck in the swamp. Michael looks for help but is attacked by hound dogs and taken to a shack where Lela is hiding. Meanwhile, Cray and a gang of criminal bounty hunters begin a manhunt for Lela. With KITT struggling to remain operational, Michael must find a way out of the swamp, which Cray has set ablaze, and rescue Lela who is trapped in a cabin filled with dynamite.
33	11	"Knightmares"	Sidney Hayers	Tom Greene & Janis Hendler	December 11, 1983	57830
Michael is chasing down a suspect who leads him to an abandoned dam, but the suspect gives him the slip. Michael finds a secret door, but the thug ambushes him and tosses a grenade. Michael narrowly avoids the blast and is injured. He later awakens in a hospital with a concussion and the only thing he remembers is his former identity; police officer Michael Long. He eventually returns to his old precinct but the cops tell him he's been "dead" for two years. In shock and suffering from amnesia, Michael becomes more confused especially after a driverless, talking car begins following him around (KITT). KITT returns him to the Foundation where Devon and April try to explain his past, but Michael refuses to believe any of it and leaves. KITT follows and convinces him to retrace his steps back to the dam. Bombarded with flashbacks, Michael must recall his identity as Michael Knight and find the man who tried to kill him.
34	12	"Silent Knight"	Bruce Kessler	Story by : Stephen B. Katz; Teleplay by : Robert W. Gilmer & Janis Hendler	December 18, 1983	57817
Michael goes to a small town to shop for a tuxedo for the Foundation's annual Christmas banquet, but he accidentally hits a Gypsy boy named Tino. He claims to be hurt and Michael begins to drive him to a hospital, but a quick scan by KITT determines the boy is fine and he has a very expensive gold watch on his person. Although Tino denies it, he lifted the watch from a group of men and Michael takes him to the police. The police inform Michael the watch was stolen during a bank robbery and the men are suspects. The crooks are not finished with Tino yet. Fearing the boy could identify them, they try to hunt him down. Michael meets Tino's worried sister Marta and suggests to her that Tino "lie low" for a while at his Uncle Stephano's camp until the cops find the suspects. Marta's devious boyfriend Nick, however, has personal connections to the crooks, and informs them where to find Tino. Marta is disgusted by Nick's betrayal and goes after her brother, warning Michael that he is still in danger. Now he must find the troubled teen before the bad guys do.
35	13	"A Knight in Shining Armor"	Bernard McEveety	Janis Hendler & Tom Greene	January 8, 1984	57832
A burglar breaks into the Foundation's guest house and murders Charlie Granger who is an adventure writer, treasure hunter, and close friend of Devon's. The killer also steals a treasure map and disappears. Devon fears Granger's daughter, Catherine, may be next since she carries the "key" to the treasure in a locket. Michael goes to the private Woodgrove School to fetch her, but the pompous and arrogant girl refuses to go with him and hardly shows grief for her father who she doesn't consider a part of her life. Michael resorts to kidnapping and forces her back to the Foundation where he tries to prove she meant everything to her father. Meanwhile, Catherine's guardian, Christopher Stone (Lance LeGault), demands Devon hand her over but he refuses until the murderer is caught. Stone's threats lead Devon to believe he is the one behind the killing and may want the treasure for himself. Elsewhere, Catherine has made contact with Stone, the only person she trusts, but she quickly finds out Stone indeed wants the treasure and will kill her to get it.
36	14	"Diamonds Aren't a Girl's Best Friend"	Jeffrey Hayden	Robert Foster & Robert W. Gilmer	January 15, 1984	57833
A fashion model named Rachel is found dead; an apparent suicide, or so the police believe, however her friend Lauren believes she was murdered and contacts the Foundation for help. Michael meets Lauren at a photo shoot and poses as her old boyfriend to avoid suspicion while he investigates. He starts by checking out Chris Carlson, Rachel's boyfriend, but finds him murdered in his apartment. After chasing and losing a suspect who fled the scene, Michael decides to snoop around during a lavish party hosted by Lauren's boss, Bernie Mitchell, who gives expensive-looking, but fake, diamond jewelry to his models. He discovers Mitchell is switching the real diamonds with the fakes after his models return from shoots in Europe and South America. His girls wear them to sneak them past U.S. Customs and Mitchell then sells them illegally to foreign VIPs. Michael guesses Rachel and Chris knew about it and planned a little heist of their own, but Mitchell caught on to their scheme. Michael still needs proof, and after Lauren is dragged down to Mexico City for Mitchell's next sale, Michael heads there and devises a sting operation involving Devon to pose as a buyer for the diamonds and catch Mitchell with enough evidence to bring him down.
37	15	"White-Line Warriors"	Bob Bralver	Richard Okie	January 29, 1984	57828
Michael goes to Vista Beach to investigate a string of robberies; the most recent hit is an art gallery owned by Marietta Mattheson and her niece, Cindy. He learns the crimes occur when a local car club meets for street racing. Michael later runs into a gruff police detective, Chief Craig, who dislikes outsiders, especially ones who drive "suped-up" cars. Michael's prime suspect is Ron Prescott, Cindy's boyfriend, who has a police record and mysteriously skips town after a jewelry store is hit. Craig has another confrontation with Michael when he shows up at the gallery looking for Ron and harasses Cindy for his whereabouts. Craig indicates Ron's car was spotted leaving the crime scene, but Cindy refuses to believe Ron had anything to do it. Michael eventually finds Ron, who swears he's not the thief and fears he's being set up. He has Ron hide out aboard the Knight mobile unit and investigates further. He soon becomes suspicious of a song, "Crumblin' Down", played by a local radio deejay, "Handsome" Anson, and realizes the song is broadcast just before each robbery while the cops are busy chasing after the racers. Believing the song is a signal for the real thief, he heads to the station to confront the deejay, but Chief Craig arrives, Michael soon discovers the detective is planning a "wealthy" retirement with Ron as his scapegoat.
38	16	"Race for Life"	Georg Fenady	Bruce Belland & Roy M. Rogosin	February 5, 1984	57826
April's niece, Becky, is in desperate need of a bone marrow transplant. At the same time, a fierce thunderstorm completely cripples the city's telephone network and the hospital is unable to access the donor database. Michael and KITT come to the rescue with KITT contacting the database and listing the compatible donors. Only one, "Julio Rodriguez", can be located. The problem is, Julio (played by Mario Marcelino) a gang member and he's currently on the run from the "Conquerors", a rival gang who thinks he shot their leader, Jimmy, during a fight. Michael finds Julio hiding in a church and pleads for him to help Becky. Julio doesn't feel safe, however. Things go wrong very quickly, however, when the Conquerors kidnap Terri, Julio's girlfriend, and threaten to kill her if he doesn't turn himself over. Julio sneaks away to deal with the gang himself and now Michael must race against the clock and rescue him in time to save Becky's life. This episode was dedicated to the memory of Macel Rafael Marcelino, the real life son of Mario Marcelino, who died while filming this episode.
39	17	"Speed Demons"	Bruce Seth Green	Tom Greene & Janis Hendler	February 12, 1984	57837
After sponsoring a charity dirt bike race, the Foundation receives information that the deadly crash in last year's event was the result of murder. More specifically, the death of Danny Duvall, a champion endurance racer. At the track, Michael learns Duvall had enemies; namely Lee Carstairs, (a flamboyant, highly-promoted racer), and Wade Fontane, (a jealous hothead who wants Duvall's girlfriend Sabrina). Sabrina is also the sister of Kelly Travis, a fellow racer and Duvall's best friend. Kelly was injured in the crash and nearly paralyzed, but Michael is impressed that he still has the will to race. Michael keeps a close eye on Kelly especially after someone tries to sabotage his bike. Michael chases the saboteur who gets away on the dirt track where KITT cannot follow, but soon, April fits KITT with a new traction system that will help him ride the rough terrain. Meanwhile, Michael finds out the saboteur is Sabrina who fears for her brother's life and wanted to stop him from racing, but Kelly is determined to get win for Danny. As the race begins, Michael is at a loss for the killer's motive, but he soon learns Carstairs high-income promotional contracts expired and he needs a win to keep his sponsors interested. KITT gets a test of his new traction system when Michael enters the race to stop Carstair's from carrying out his deadly plan.
40	18	"Goliath Returns"	Winrich Kolbe	Robert Foster & Robert W. Gilmer and Tom Greene & Janis Hendler	February 19, 1984	57879
41	19	"Goliath Returns"	Winrich Kolbe	Robert Foster & Robert W. Gilmer and Tom Greene & Janis Hendler	February 19, 1984	57880
Garthe Knight escapes from prison; broken out by his menacing truck "Goliath" which crashes through the prison walls. Meanwhile, Michael is attending a reception for Dr. Klaus Bergstrom, a brilliant scientist who is in town for a symposium on laser technology. Since Bergstrom's knowledge would be quite valuable to an enemy government, the Foundation is assigned to protect him, however things get complicated once Michael learns of Garthe's escape and the sudden appearance of Goliath which was thought to be destroyed. Later, Garthe teams up with another familiar enemy, Adrianne St. Clair (formerly Margeaux) (Ann Turkel), who once tried to steal KITT. Her technicians have rebuilt Goliath and this time made certain the truck's weaknesses have been eliminated. Soon, Garthe raids the Foundation and abducts Devon and April in a plan to lure Michael into a trap. With Michael temporarily out of the way, Garthe and Adrianne abduct Dr. Bergstrom and replace him with a surgically altered clone to deceive his niece Christina. Christina becomes suspicious that her uncle is an impostor after he loses his limp caused by a sprained ankle the night before. Michael arrives to check on her and confirms her suspicions that her uncle is a fraud. The story continues as Michael and KITT find Adrianne's estate where Garthe is holding Devon, April and Dr. Bergstrom prisoner. The duo doesn't get far when they encounter Goliath blocking their path. Veering out of the way, KITT flies off a cliff but is saved by his new emergency parachute, however KITT is disabled in a rough landing. Garthe's thugs soon capture Michael and he's introduced to Garthe's dungeon; a rat infested cell just like the one Garthe was held captive inside of in Africa. KITT is held in a garage with his nemesis Goliath. Elsewhere, Devon, April and Bergstrom rig an explosive to escape their cell, but they are quickly captured again. Garthe reveals that Bergstrom will be "sold" to an interested government and smuggled out of the country via submarine which is waiting off the coast. Devon and April's fate will be to die along with Michael once Garthe self-destructs the mansion. Michael eventually escapes the dungeon by tricking the guards with an assembled recording of Adrianne's voice. He quickly fixes KITT and rushes to fetch Christina and has the impostor Bergstrom arrested. Once Christina is safe, Michael returns to the estate to rescue Devon and April before the whole place blows. He then races to rescue the real Bergstrom from Goliath's trailer and stop Garthe and Adrianne once and for all.: Note: Originally shown as a feature-length episode, which was later cut into two separate episodes for syndication.
42	20	"A Good Knight's Work"	Sidney Hayers	Richard Okie	March 4, 1984	57840
An international criminal named Cameron Zachary (John Vernon) discovers Michael Long is still alive as Michael Knight. In fact, it was Zachary who planned the original hit on Long that failed when the assassin (and his lover), Tanya Walker, was killed. Zachary not only seeks revenge against Long but also schemes to get his hands on Wilton Knight's dream: the Knight Industries 2000. Meanwhile, in a seemingly unrelated case, Michael helps Gina Adams (Alexa Hamilton), a toy designer who claims the Triple M Toy company stole the schematics for her high-tech "Mighty Mouth" teddy bear. After breaking into Triple M, Michael discovers the factory is doing more than making toys and is secretly producing a handheld laser weapon. Michael also finds Zachary's thugs waiting for him and barely escapes. He now believes Triple M is a front company for Zachary and Gina set him up. He confronts her, but Zachary's thugs arrive and hold her hostage. Michael has no choice but to meet their demands and hand over KITT, whom Michael orders to shut down. The thugs lock KITT inside a truck and Michael is taken to meet Zachary face-to-face. He has unfinished business with Michael Long. Now Michael's only chance is a new secret homing device that remotely activates KITT and brings him to the rescue.
43	21	"Mouth of the Snake" "All That Glitters"	Winrich Kolbe	Robert Foster & Robert W. Gilmer	April 8, 1984	57877
44	22	"Mouth of the Snake" "All That Glitters"	Winrich Kolbe	Robert Foster & Robert W. Gilmer	April 8, 1984	57878
Michael goes to Calexico on an investigation for Joanna St. John, whose ex-husband, attorney Arthur Abrams, has been murdered at the Mexican border. Abrams was investigating the smuggling of illegal aliens into the country. When Michael and Joanna check out the site, they find the operation was smuggling more than immigrants when pieces of pottery are found with flecks of gold. Heading back to Joanna's motel, the two find an intruder who makes an amazing acrobatic getaway. Michael learns the man is David Dalton (Charles Taylor), a federal investigator working secretly for the Justice Department. Dalton is after Eduardo O'Brian, an Irish-Mexican crime lord who Dalton believes is behind Abram's murder. Dalton is hard to catch, but once Michael finds him, he convinces him they're on the same side and should work together. Michael and KITT conduct the legwork of the investigation while Dalton stays close to Joanna who decides to infiltrate O'Brien's birthday party at a beach house estate owned by Elton Mathews. Mathews has been supplying the vehicles and equipment for a mysterious digging operation only known as "Boca Culebra" (a.k.a. Mouth of the Snake). As KITT creates a disturbance, Michael hitches a ride aboard a truck and finds statues with gold bricks inside. Dalton learns O'Brien is using the gold to purchase a cargo plane, but the reason still eludes him. The story continues as Michael and Dalton investigate further and discover a warehouse filled with rockets. Michael and KITT soon learn the rockets are for a semi truck with a mobile launcher hidden in the trailer and the duo barely escape its attack. Elsewhere, Joanna becomes more acquainted with O'Brien who quickly becomes infatuated with her. He invites her aboard his yacht where she manages to steal the combination to his safe. Dalton later sneaks aboard and breaks into the safe where he finds plans for advanced weapon systems. O'Brien eventually figures out he's been duped when he finds the combination in Joanna's waste basket, however he doesn't immediately let on to her treachery. Meanwhile, Michael follows Mathew's trucks to the dig site discovering a cave "the mouth" and a secret tunnel "the snake" which leads to a military weapons depot. The pieces come together as O'Brien plans to use the rockets to attack the base while his men raid the depot vaults for the experimental weapons. Notes: Originally shown as a feature-length episode, which was later cut into two separate episodes for syndication.; The character of David Dalton would later be portrayed in the NBC television movie Code of Vengeance produced by Glen Lawson.
45	23	"Let It Be Me"	Bernard McEveety	Story by : William Elliott; Teleplay by : Robert Foster & Robert W. Gilmer	May 13, 1984	57834
Greg Noble, the lead singer of the rock band "Class Action", is found dead from a drug overdose. His duet singer Stevie March (played by David Hasslehoff's real-life future wife, Catherine Hickland) however, believes Greg was murdered and contacts the Foundation. Michael knows Stevie all too well since she is really Stephanie Mason, Michael Long's former fiancée, who he helped on a previous mission. With her identity changed in a witness protection program, Stevie joined a rock band and started her life over. Michael infiltrates the group by becoming their new lead singer. The plot thickens when Michael and Stevie find one of Greg's video tapes contains a single frame of binary computer code hidden amongst performance footage. Michael decides to investigate the band's producer, Barbara Bellingham, who has a master tape hidden in a safe. He gets the tape to April who deciphers the code as airline schedules and drug weights for what Michael believes to be a drug delivery schedule. Soon, Stevie stumbles upon her manager, Paul Block, and her producer scheming their plans to transmit the code to a fellow drug smuggler. Now Michael must give the performance of his life to protect Stevie and stop her producer's plot.
46	24	"Big Iron"	Bernard L. Kowalski	Julie Friedgen	May 27, 1984	57804
Michael heads to Tucson to investigate the theft of construction equipment from Frank Sanderson, a struggling contractor who stands to lose everything if his projects are not completed on schedule. Michael's first suspect is Frank's former business partner, Lloyd Newald, especially after Michael finds a freshly repainted bulldozer on his lot that is similar to one recently stolen from Frank's job site. Newald hotly denies being a thief, but Michael knows Newald's financial problems could be a motive. Needing more proof, Michael tracks down the stolen equipment in a remote quarry, but he and KITT come under attack. A bulldozer pushes KITT into a ravine and buries him under tons of dirt. Michael and KITT barely escape the pit and give chase to the men leaving the site, but KITT is damaged and cannot keep up. Michael tracks the getaway truck's license plates back to Newald and pays him another visit. Newald still denies being involved and offers to help find the real thieves. A surprising lead develops when Michael discovers Frank's wife Lucy is having an affair with a dubious equipment dealer named Vance Burke, whose operation may involve stolen vehicles. With Frank and Lloyd's help, Michael lays a trap with a bulldozer as bait to catch Burke and his thugs in the act.
