= Knight Rider season 4 =

Knight Rider
- Season 4
- DVD cover
- No. of episodes: 22

Release
- Original network: NBC
- Original release: September 20, 1985 – April 4, 1986

Season chronology
- ← Previous; Season 3

The fourth and final season of Knight Rider, an American television series that ran from Sept 26, 1982 to Apr 4, 1986, began September 20, 1985, and ended on April 4, 1986. It aired on NBC. The region 1 DVD was released on April 4, 2006.

Interest in the show declined, leading to its cancellation by the end of the season. Hasselhoff, knowing that the show was coming to an end, attempted to make a "series finale" and helped conceive the story "The Scent of Roses" with his wife at the time, Catherine Hickland, who played Michael's love interest Stephanie Mason in past episodes. The network instead aired "Voodoo Knight" as the final episode.

A new street-smart mechanic, played by Peter Parros, was added to the cast in addition to Bonnie. Of all KITT's features added in the fourth season, the most important of them is "Super Pursuit Mode". KITT could also convert into an open convertible. Both cars were designed and built by customizer George Barris.

This season also marks the final appearance of Bonnie Barstow, RC3, and the Knight Industries Two Thousand in its original form. KITT's final appearance in the Knight Rider franchise was in the 1991 made-for-TV movie Knight Rider 2000.

== Cast ==
- David Hasselhoff as Michael Knight
- William Daniels as the voice of KITT (Knight Industries Two Thousand) (uncredited)
- Edward Mulhare as Devon Miles
- Patricia McPherson as Dr. Bonnie Barstow
- Peter Parros as Reginald Cornelius III a.k.a. RC3
- Richard Basehart as the voice of Wilton Knight

== Episodes ==
No. overall	No. in season	Title	Directed by	Written by	Original release date	Prod. code
69	1	"Knight of the Juggernaut"	Georg Fenady	Robert Foster & Burton Armus	September 20, 1985	60275
70	2	"Knight of the Juggernaut"	Georg Fenady	Robert Foster & Burton Armus	September 20, 1985	60276
Michael goes to Chicago on an assignment to guard a valuable isotope. Elsewhere, Wilton Knight's daughter unexpectedly suspends FLAG's operations and Michael and KITT find themselves out of a job. Meanwhile, an international terrorist kidnaps Devon Miles and replaces him with a surgically altered impostor as a plot to get his hands on the isotope. Devon's changed behavior alerts Michael's suspicions and he disobeys orders to "take a vacation" until he finds out what is going on. Clues lead to a warehouse, where KITT's molecular bonded armor is unknowingly neutralized by a chemical sprayer on a nearby street, and he and Michael are attacked by an armored vehicle KITT cannot defend against. Devon strangely writes-off KITT as a total loss, and when he answers a question Michael asks about Moby Dick wrong, Michael is even more doubtful that it is truly Devon. Seeing as KITT was nearly destroyed in the armored car attack, Bonnie cannot repair him without Devon Miles' assistance or FLAG's facilities. She and Michael enlist the help of "The Street Avenger," a friendly street vigilante named Reginald Cornelius the 3rd, or RC3, whose gang of friends take KITT to their garage to rebuild him. KITT is reborn with some new gadgets, including a rocket-fast "super pursuit" mode. Michael must now race to save the real Devon and prevent the theft of the isotope.: Note: Originally shown as a feature-length episode, which was later cut into two separate episodes for syndication.
71	3	"K.I.T.T. Nap"	Bernard McEveety	Skip Webster	September 27, 1985	60216
Michael hunts down a criminal who has escaped capture for years, but the criminal decides to take out Michael once and for all. He first kidnaps an innocent college student that is interviewing Michael, then traps and steals KITT, supposedly with Michael in it. Fortunately Michael and KITT separate beforehand so only KITT was stolen. Michael manages to find and free KITT. In the end, they stop the criminals, and once again save the day.
72	4	"Sky Knight"	Jeffrey Hayden	Carlton Hollander & Dennis Rodriguez	October 18, 1985	60219
A plane that Bonnie is traveling on is hijacked by a group of men led by an ex-intelligence agent (Ron O'Neal) who demands money and the release of "political" prisoners. Michael and KITT manage to track them to a military bunker that was designed to keep high-ranking officials safe in the event of terror attacks, and is surrounded by mines and other automated security systems and assumed to be impossible to break into. The hijackers also activate a "doomsday device" time bomb within the bunker. KITT gets Michael past the site's defenses, and Michael gets the key to stop the bomb, with just seconds to spare. Guest stars: Brian Thompson (Night Slasher in Cobra) as Kurt
73	5	"Burial Ground"	Chuck Bail	Michael Eric Stein	October 25, 1985	60204
Michael must locate a missing archeologist and his assistant, who has been kidnapped by an oil baron (Robert Pine), who is set to gain possession of Indian land if no artifacts are found. He finds and rescues them both, just in time to save the Indian burial grounds.
74	6	"The Wrong Crowd"	Chuck Bail	George S. Dinallo	November 1, 1985	60221
Michael must stop a gang of thieves, who hijack FLAG's mobile base truck, thinking it to be hauling liquor. When they discover all the high-tech computer gear inside, one of the gang turns out to be a wiz with computers. He leads them to use the equipment for a crime spree, including the hacking of a robotic military vehicle armed with a missile that his parents built. When the young man unknowingly misdirects the vehicle to destroy the base truck by mistake, the thieves decide to leave, leaving the people trapped inside. Seeing them as not his true friends, he stays behind to help Michael get the vehicle to chase him and KITT instead; they manage to destroy the vehicle by making it hit a vacant shack.
75	7	"Knight Sting"	Sidney Hayers	Herman Miller	November 8, 1985	60224
Bonnie poses as jetsetter, Devon as a newscaster, and Michael as a hitman in order to infiltrate a foreign embassy where an official plans to smuggle a canister of deadly bacteria out of the country. RC3 poses as a butler as well. KITT even goes undercover as a rare foreign car. Michael manages to switch the canister just before their cover is blown. Michael tricks the enemy into thinking that he would shoot the canister unless he lets go of Bonnie and another hostage, which he does, not knowing that he has a fake canister.
76	8	"Many Happy Returns"	Georg Fenady	Michael Halperin	November 15, 1985	60203
Michael investigates the theft of a high-tech hovercraft and tries to intercept it, before a black market arms dealer can smuggle it out of the country. Michael finds out that it was aided by a mole, a disgruntled employee, within the company. He felt that if he wasn't going to get the recognition he deserved from the company, then he would get it from someone else. In the end, Michael manages to stop them and save the company.
77	9	"Knight Racer"	Charles Watson Sanford	Paul Diamond	November 22, 1985	60222
Michael investigates an open wheel race team plagued by mysterious accidents. Michael also takes the team's opening as a substitute race car driver at Riverside and finds out that the owner of another racing team is the biological father of the woman on the team he is trying to help; the father claims that he wanted to keep the other team from taking his entire life away, including his daughter, if they win the race. In the end, they win the race thanks to Michael.
78	10	"Knight Behind Bars"	Bernard McEveety	Richard Okie	December 6, 1985	60202
Michael investigates a women's prison where inmates are stealing the plans of a hotel being used as a meeting place for a defense conference. Bonnie goes undercover as an inmate. The masterminds, the ruthless warden and the prison fitness instructor, were after a pure crystal, that could be used to power a powerful laser. At the last minute, an inmate in the scheme changes sides and helps them capture the rest of the group.
79	11	"Knight Song"	Georg Fenady	Burton Armus	December 13, 1985	60230
RC3 helps a friend, who is involved in a real-estate plan that could help revitalize RC3's old neighborhood. A rival developer, also a past friend of RC3, however, has other plans to keep the area a drug-infested slum. With help from the neighborhood, Michael and RC3 are able to stop the destruction of their neighborhood.
80	12	"The Scent of Roses"	Sidney Hayers	E. Nick Alexander	January 3, 1986	60212
A near-fatal encounter with a criminal mastermind has Michael thinking about early retirement and he considers quitting the Foundation. Devon reunites Michael with Stephanie "Stevie" Mason, and Michael quits the Foundation. After Michael and Stevie are married, the mastermind returns and Stevie takes a bullet for Michael, which kills her. Michael seeks vengeance against the mastermind. Once he captures the man responsible, he decides to head home with KITT to friends and family. (Originally intended as the show's final episode.)
81	13	"Killer K.I.T.T."	Chuck Bail	Simon Rose	January 10, 1986	60226
A vengeful computer expert who helped design KITT's software reprograms KITT to turn against Michael and subsequently ruin FLAG's reputation by having KITT kill everyone at the FLAG's national convention. Michael thinks they may have to destroy KITT to stop him, but Michael is able to replace the tampered circuit on him before he hurts anyone. Afterward, Bonnie and the foundation technicians decide to develop safe-guards, so KITT will never be hacked ever again.
82	14	"Out of the Woods"	Harvey Laidman	Gregory S. Dinallo	January 17, 1986	60211
Michael works to expose a sawmill operation that has been cutting timber from a protected national forest. Michael first believes that founder of the sawmill is in kahutz with woodcutters, but he soon finds out that his daughter is the one at fault
83	15	"Deadly Knightshade"	Sidney Hayers	Philip John Taylor	January 24, 1986	60229
Michael tries to prove a master magician has committed a murder, and used his stage illusions to appear to be on stage during the crime as the perfect alibi. It is soon realized that the murder and the attempted murder on Devon was an effort by one chairman of the board to get full control of FLAG's distribution of money to its many resources. Michael is able to catch the magician and save Devon.
84	16	"Redemption of a Champion"	Chuck Bail	E. Nick Alexander	January 31, 1986	60227
Michael investigates an upcoming rematch between two boxers. After the murder of a sports reporter, who may have had incriminating evidence about the legendary fighting match, Michael races against the clock to save one of the fighters who may die if he fights in the ring again. Special appearances by Don King, Ken Foree, and Carlos Palomino.
85	17	"Knight of a Thousand Devils"	Gino Grimaldi	Peter Allan Fields	February 7, 1986	60228
An FBI agent and close friend to Michael, is killed by a mobster who escapes during a botched raid. Michael and RC3 trail him to a dune buggy race, where the criminal is posing as a driver and planning an escape across the Mexican border. With the help of another undercover agent, Michael is able to catch the mobster.
86	18	"Hills of Fire"	Robert Bralver	Jackson Gillis	February 14, 1986	60220
Michael and KITT investigate a string of arson fires in a national park, but the arsonist evades capture with an off-road vehicle to flee over terrain KITT cannot drive over. Bonnie also creates a special Satellite Infiltration Drone, also known as SID, that can become any object when spying on the enemy. The fires are a cover for a big drug smuggling operation and most of the townspeople are involved, a crooked police chief included. Special appearance by Vernon Wells.
87	19	"Knight Flight to Freedom"	Winrich Kolbe	George S. Dinallo	February 21, 1986	60232
Michael goes to South America and tries to help an American political figure escape a country in the middle of a coup d'état. Michael gets caught and is to be executed by a firing squad. With the help of RC3, he is able to fake his death and rescue the other prisoners. With help from the country's resistance movement, they are able to defeat the military and win back their freedom in the country.
88	20	"Fright Knight"	Gilbert Shilton	Story by : James Byrnes & Samm Smith; Teleplay by : James Byrnes & Samm Smith & Leonard Kaufman	March 7, 1986	60223
Michael and KITT investigate the grounds of a movie studio where unexplained accidents on the sets are thought to be the work of a legendary stage phantom. The special effects person is fired after a special effect puts an actor in the hospital. When he is investigated by Michael, he finds evidence that someone is sabotaging the stunts for the movie. After another accident nearly costs an actor's life, Michael tells everyone that he will check everything before any scene is done. He talks to the director and volunteers to be a stunt double in hopes to catch the legendary stage phantom. He also calls in RC3 to help him out; Michael also finds out that a man named Galvin gains more money if the picture is not finished; because he borrows money from unfriendly men, he is now in serious debt to them. The saboteur kills Galvin because Michael is getting too close. The saboteur turns out to be the director's assistant. Guest stars: Robert Englund as Edward Kent
89	21	"Knight of the Rising Sun"	Winrich Kolbe	Story by : Burton Armus & Bruce Lansbury; Teleplay by : E. Nick Alexander	March 14, 1986	60233
Michael must protect the son of Devon's friend from a Japanese businessman who is determined to kidnap him, believing he is the descendant of the founder of a terrorist cult.
90	22	"Voo Doo Knight"	Georg Fenady	Story by : R. Timothy Kring; Teleplay by : R. Timothy Kring & Deborah Dean Davis	April 4, 1986	60225
Michael tries to stop a voodoo woman, who is using mind control on innocent people and forcing them to commit crimes for her.
