= Knight Rider season 1 =

Knight Rider
- Season 1
- DVD cover
- No. of episodes: 22

Release
- Original network: NBC
- Original release: September 26, 1982 – May 6, 1983

Season chronology
- Next → Season 2

The first season of Knight Rider, an American television series, debuted on September 26, 1982, and ended on May 6, 1983. It aired on NBC. The region 1 DVD was released on August 3, 2004.

Knight Rider had a two-hour premiere on NBC, airing at 8PM on Sunday night. The show was put up against Dallas, and would eventually move NBC out of third place in the network race. The show eventually aired on Friday nights, and in December 1982 became the second-highest-rated show of its day; M*A*S*H was number 1.

The show was renewed for a second season during the filming of "Short Notice".

== Season 1 ==
The pilot episode featured Larry Anderson as Michael Long. Anderson is replaced by Hasselhoff after Michael Long is shot in the Nevada desert. Hasselhoff's voice is dubbed over Anderson's for all of his lines. Anderson elected to remain uncredited in the episode.

At the end of Season 1, lead actress Patricia McPherson was fired from the show due to a falling out with producer Robert Foster, and her character was written out of the show. McPherson was replaced by Rebecca Holden in the second season. Hasselhoff was reportedly angry about McPherson's firing, but was in no position to fight the network or the show's producers. Holden left the show at the end of season two, and McPherson returned for season 3.

David Hasselhoff's then-girlfriend, Catherine Hickland, appeared in episode 19, "White Bird," as Michael Long's ex-fiancée Stevie Mason. Hickland also helped to write the episode.

At the end of season 1 during the studio wrap party, Hasselhoff celebrated Hickland's birthday. A cake was presented with a replica of K.I.T.T. sitting on top. Written in icing were the words "Look Under the Hood." An engagement ring had been placed under the hood, and Hasselhoff proposed.

Hickland later returned to the show twice, on season two's "Let it Be Me", and season four's "The Scent of Roses."

== Cast ==
- David Hasselhoff as Michael Knight
- William Daniels as the voice of KITT (Knight Industries Two Thousand) (uncredited)
- Edward Mulhare as Devon Miles
- Patricia McPherson as Dr. Bonnie Barstow
- Richard Basehart as Wilton Knight, and the voiceover of Wilton Knight

== Episodes ==
No. overall	No. in season	Title	Directed by	Written by	Original release date	Prod. code
1	1	"Knight of the Phoenix"	Daniel Haller	Glen A. Larson	September 26, 1982	57375
2	2	"Knight of the Phoenix"	Daniel Haller	Glen A. Larson	September 26, 1982	57376
After Detective Michael Long is shot and left for dead, he is saved by eccentric billionaire Wilton Knight and his associate Devon Miles. He is given a new face by plastic surgery, a new identity as Michael Knight, and the Knight Industries Two Thousand (KITT for short) – a super advanced, artificially intelligent Trans-Am with nearly invulnerable armor and an arsenal of self-defense capabilities. On his death bed, Wilton asks Michael to carry on his crime-fighting crusade believing "one man can make a difference." Soon Michael manages to locate his shooter, a woman named Tanya Walker, who is stealing technology secrets from a computer company and selling them to the highest bidder. With the help of a woman named Maggie, Michael lures Tanya into a trap by showing off KITT's abilities as bait.: Note: Originally shown as a feature-length Pilot TV Movie, which was later cut into two separate episodes for syndication.; Guest stars: Lance LeGault (Colonel Roderick Decker on The A-Team), Richard Anderson (Oscar Goldman on The Six Million Dollar Man and The Bionic Woman) and Ed Gilbert (Fenton Hardy on The Hardy Boys/Nancy Drew Mysteries)
3	3	"Deadly Maneuvers"	Paul Stanley	William Schmidt & Bob Shayne	October 1, 1982	57305
Michael helps a stranded Army Lieutenant named Robin Ladd who learns her father has died in a suspicious accident. Michael conducts his own investigation which leads to uncovering the theft of nuclear warheads from an Army weapons depot and evidence the top brass may be involved.
4	4	"Good Day at White Rock"	Daniel Haller	Deborah Davis	October 8, 1982	57303
Michael plans a rock-climbing holiday in the small town of White Rock. There he experiences bullying, even against nice young boy Davey, and an equally coward sheriff more interested in keeping the peace than enforcing the law. Michael tries to help when the Scorpions motorcycle gang moves in, but gets incarcerated and escapes. He deals with them himself and finds out they expect the rival gang Road Dogs for a confrontation which would wreck the town.
5	5	"Slammin' Sammy's Stunt Show Spectacular"	Bruce Bilson	E. Paul Edwards & John Alan Schwartz	October 22, 1982	57315
Devon instructs Michael to investigate corporate raider Lawrence Blake, who buys mortgages and firms which all 'happen to' go broke shortly after. The next prey is Sammy Phillips's private stock car and motor vehicle stunts show, which he runs with his son Mark, a would-be motorbike stuntman. Michael infiltrates as new stunt driver after Sammy has a suspicious accident. Driving Kitt, stunts are almost too easy. Blake's goon Bill Gordon attempts to sabotage the show, although he has an inside accomplice. Guest stars: Marc Alaimo (Gul Dukat on Star Trek: Deep Space Nine)
6	6	"Just My Bill"	Sidney Hayers	Story by : Catherine Bacos; Teleplay by : Deborah Davis & David Braff	October 29, 1982	57311
Devon assigns Michael to protect Senator Maggie Flynn, a close friend to Devon, who has made enemies in her political crusade to fight a new energy bill. After numerous attempts on her life, Michael arranges for her to hide out with Devon, much to Devon's chagrin, while he conducts an investigation with Flynn's assistant Jane Adams, who suspects a rival politician to be involved in the attacks.
7	7	"Not a Drop to Drink"	Virgil W. Vogel	Hannah L. Shearer	November 5, 1982	57304
Michael and K.I.T.T. are sent to protect a group of ranchers whose water supply is being cut off by a wealthy landowner. Michael meets his match in a hotheaded young widow who leads the fight for their rights and is instructed to make sure she doesn't do anything too impulsive.
8	8	"No Big Thing"	Bernard L. Kowalski	Judy Burns	November 12, 1982	57313
Devon Miles is arrested on a traffic violation in Lyndhurst Flats and ends up sharing a jail with Frank Reston, the very journalist he was planning to meet. When Reston is killed by the corrupt police officers because he had too much evidence against them and a corrupt judge that controls them, Devon's life is now on the line because he is the only witness to see Reston alive. Michael teams up with Frank's ex-wife Carol in his search for Devon and expose the corruption to the proper authorities.
9	9	"Trust Doesn't Rust"	Paul Stanley	Steven E. De Souza	November 19, 1982	57307
Two petty thieves, Tony and Rev (William Sanderson), break into a Foundation warehouse and unwittingly reactivate KARR (the Knight Automated Roving Robot) (voiced by Peter Cullen), which was sitting in storage. Responding to the break in, Michael and KITT arrive to see the two thieves make a getaway in KITT's identical twin. After Michael learns that KARR was KITT's prototype and programmed with an unstable self-preservation AI, he goes after the vehicle which the two thieves are using to crash into bank vaults. Things become more complicated when KARR has the thieves kidnap Bonnie so she can repair a malfunctioning circuit. Michael and KITT managed to get Bonnie back, and try to disable KARR using a laser. When this fails, Michael sets KITT on a direct collision course with KARR, betting on KARR's self-preservation to defeat him.
10	10	"Inside Out"	Peter Crane	Steven E. De Souza	November 26, 1982	57302
Michael captures a criminal named Dugan and takes his place as Colonel Kincaid's new driver. His goal is to find out for what purpose Kincaid is building his own private task team and catch him red-handed.
11	11	"The Final Verdict"	Bernard Kowalski	Story by : Tom Greene and John Alan Schwartz & E. Paul Edwards; Teleplay by : John Alan Schwartz & E. Paul Edwards	December 3, 1982	57316
Cheryl Burns, an old friend of Michael's, has been accused of murder. Michael asks for some time off to search out the only man who can clear Cheryl: accountant Marty King, a "Woody Allen" type. However Marty is a person of interest by the police to expose his crooked employer for "cooking the books". This episode is dedicated to early season 1 co-executive producer R.A. Cinader, who died during the filming of this episode, stating "he was an original."
12	12	"A Plush Ride"	Sidney Hayers	Gregory S. Dinallo	December 10, 1982	57306
Devon Miles has organized an anti-terrorism treaty between three rather unstable third world nations. Michael is assigned to find a plant (and possible hit-man) amongst the security team. He joins them during their special training session at Redmond's Victory Academy. However, Michael wonders if this is the work of one person or a team.
13	13	"Forget Me Not"	Gil Bettman	Story by : Chris Lucky and Richard Christian Matheson & Thomas Szollosi; Teleplay by : Richard Christian Matheson & Thomas Szollosi and Karen Harris & Deborah Davis	December 17, 1982	57312
Michael Knight is staying at a beach house with the daughter of the newly elected president of the South American country of San Marada. His assignment is to protect both her and her father. A young woman named Micki overhears the conspirators' plot to assassinate El Presidente. She is kidnapped, but escapes the car by jumping from a cliff. Michael manages to rescue Micki, though she ends up with temporary amnesia. Can the only witness remember in time before the assassination can take place? Note: This is the final episode to be directly supervised by series creator Glen A. Larson, fulfilling his original contact with Universal. While Larson would continue to be credited as Executive Producer throughout the run of the series and would offer his comments on script drafts, Robert Foster would take over as showrunner beginning with the next episode.
14	14	"Hearts of Stone"	Jeffrey Hayden	Robert Foster	January 14, 1983	57322
Michael goes to Texas to meet Father Carlos Laguna, whose family is feuding with a group of gunrunners in possession of an advanced assault rifle called the X-19. The situation worsens when Carlos' brother Roberto is shot with an X-19 during a drive-by attack. With the help of a bartender named Angie, Michael poses as a gun collector and makes contact with the gunrunners where he offers to buy the whole shipment of X-19s. They strike a deal, but Angie tricks Michael and steals his suitcase full of money, which was charity funds provided by Devon. Note: This is the first episode to be supervised by new showrunner Robert Foster and, as a result, a change in tone begins for the series. In addition, KITT's voice modulator is upgraded for the first time into the trio of digital bars seen during the remainder of the series. (The style, colored amber, was first seen in "Trust Doesn't Rust" as the voice modulator for K.A.R.R.)
15	15	"Give Me Liberty… or Give Me Death"	Bernard L. Kowalski	David Braff	January 21, 1983	57323
Michael and KITT enter the Alternative 2000, a cross country race for cars that run on alternative fuel. They are there to find a saboteur, not to win, but find themselves having to rescue nosy reporter Liberty Cox in each lap. The mastermind is the ambitious TV broadcaster sponsor of the race and a member of the race safety crew.
16	16	"The Topaz Connection"	Alan Myerson	Stephen Katz	January 28, 1983	57321
A high-profile "skin magazine" editor named Philip Royce is murdered and Michael helps his daughter Lauren investigate who killed him and why. The clues may be found in Royce's computer, but the file he was working on is password protected under the code name "Topaz". The plot thickens when a private investigator Royce hired calls Lauren to reveal the story, but the man is killed by a sniper. Lauren and Michael then follow the P.I.'s leads to Las Vegas in hopes of uncovering the meaning behind Topaz, but quickly come across more thugs who want them eliminated.
17	17	"A Nice, Indecent Little Town"	Gil Betteman	Frank Telford	February 18, 1983	57317
Michael travels to Alpine Crest posing as a skip-tracer in pursuit of a counterfeiter. There he and KITT find out CIA is keeping an eye on a much bigger operation. Michael's only ally is a local journalist, while taking on a group of corrupt police officers aligned with the counterfeiter.
18	18	"Chariot of Gold"	Bernard L. Kowalski	William Schmidt	February 25, 1983	57326
Bonnie is given the honor of joining the Helios society, whose members all have genius level I.Q.'s. This to Devon's chagrin, who was expecting a nomination himself, but has to be content with honorary membership. However, it soon becomes clear that high ranking members of the society are planning to ensure their own survival by committing the perfect crime. For this they need to get their hands on KITT and to get rid of its driver, Michael Knight.
19	19	"White Bird"	Winrich Kolbe	Virginia Aldridge	March 4, 1983	57330
Michael learns that the woman he was once engaged to, Stephanie Mason (Catherine Hickland), has been arrested for her involvement in a money laundering scheme. Unfortunately, he was engaged to her when he was Michael Long and Stephanie thinks he is dead. The Justice Department has given Stephanie the option of turning in her boss, Gilbert Cole, or face conspiracy charges if she refuses. The situation intensifies when Cole sends thugs to eliminate her before she can testify before a grand jury. Now Michael must protect the woman he once loved and capture the people who are setting her up, all the while avoiding slip ups that may give away his secret identity.
20	20	"Knight Moves"	Christian I. Nyby II	William Schmidt	March 11, 1983	57332
A shipment of highly sensitive Micro-Tech electronic components is stolen near Albuquerque, New Mexico. When Michael goes to investigate, he finds himself attracted to the cause of the Alliance of Independent Truckers, who have lost 6 shipments. He is also attracted to AIT spokesperson and lady trucker Terri "The Tiger" Calley.
21	21	"Nobody Does It Better"	Harvey Laidman	David Braff	April 29, 1983	57331
A CEO of an electronics firm (Robert Ginty) hires the Foundation to help catch whoever is stealing software from his company. Michael suspects someone on the inside – a programmer named Julian Groves (Tony Dow) when he learns of his involvement with a con-woman named Connie Chason. Soon an overzealous private investigator named Flannery Roe (Gail Edwards), hired by Grove's wife, gets into Michael's way, but things become more complicated when Connie is found murdered in Julian's bungalow and the programmer is on the run. Michael doesn't believe Julian is capable of murder and he and Flannery are forced to tolerate each other to find the real killer.
22	22	"Short Notice"	Robert Foster	Robert Foster	May 6, 1983	57336
Michael picks up a hitchhiker who's looking for her daughter. When he defends her from a couple of bikers from the Satan's Stompers motorcycle club, he ends up charged with second degree murder himself. The only reason she is reluctant is because her husband, the leader of the gang, has her daughter and she has the evidence that can put him away.
