= Knight Rider season 3 =

Knight Rider
- Season 3
- DVD box
- No. of episodes: 22

Release
- Original network: NBC
- Original release: September 30, 1984 – May 5, 1985

Season chronology
- ← Previous; Season 2 Next → Season 4

The third season of Knight Rider, an American television series that ran from Sept 26, 1982 to Apr 4, 1986, began September 30, 1984, and ended on May 5, 1985. It aired on NBC. The region 1 DVD was released on January 31, 2006.

KITT's dashboard was redesigned, and he gained some new abilities. Patricia McPherson returned as Bonnie Barstow, and would remain until the end of the series.

Michael and Devon had also become close friends as well as associates by this point, trusting one another enough to work and conspire in secret together without notifying KITT or Bonnie ("Knight in Disgrace").

KITT's renegade prototype KARR resurfaced in the episode "K.I.T.T. vs. K.A.R.R". A new voice actor, Paul Frees, replaced KARR's original voice actor, Peter Cullen.

== Cast ==
- David Hasselhoff as Michael Knight
- William Daniels as the voice of KITT (Knight Industries Two Thousand) (uncredited)
- Edward Mulhare as Devon Miles
- Patricia McPherson as Dr. Bonnie Barstow
- Richard Basehart as the voice of Wilton Knight
- Paul Frees as the voice of KARR (Knight Automated Roving Robot) (uncredited).

== Episodes ==
No. overall	No. in season	Title	Directed by	Written by	Original release date	Prod. code
47	1	"Knight of the Drones"	Sidney Hayers	Robert Foster & Gerald Sanford	September 30, 1984	58675
48	2	"Knight of the Drones"	Sidney Hayers	Robert Foster & Gerald Sanford	September 30, 1984	58676
Michael meets up with Bonnie at a university research center in San Francisco to convince her to return to the Foundation. Elsewhere, a criminal mastermind named Margo Sheridan rounds up high-tech criminals: a criminal from prison (whose escape they have arranged by the use of a remote control drone car), an electrician on probation with alarm system expertise, and Bonnie's college advisor, David Halston (Jared Martin), to commit a robbery at the Federal Reserve Bank. As soon as Bonnie starts inspecting a chip removed from one of Halston's drone cars, she confirms he is involved, and Halston kidnaps her. After Michael uses KITT to electrocute two muscle-bound henchmen, Clifton and Turk, they reveal where Halston is hiding Bonnie. When they go to that location with the police, they find that building has been emptied, and neither Bonnie nor Halston were there. Michael then uses reverse psychology to get Clifton and Turk to believe that the squirt gun he has is a pain inducer, and they reveal that Halston wanted maps of Chinese tunnels that once were in the area. Later, the escaped convict and electrician realize the direction Halston has them digging in is not towards the bank, but towards the vault of a weapons company. It is revealed that Halston designed a weapon for that company, but wasn't fully credited for the achievement and decides to sell it to the highest bidder.: Note: Originally shown as a feature-length episode, which was later cut into two separate episodes for syndication.
49	3	"The Ice Bandits"	Georg Fenady	Gerald Sanford	October 7, 1984	58603
Michael infiltrates a monastery/winery to locate a diamond thief. The winery is actually a front for a clinic that specializes in plastic surgery for criminals wanting their appearance changed. Michael and KITT also (briefly) encounter a donkey named Kit, much to KITT's displeasure.
50	4	"Knights of the Fast Lane"	Winrich Kolbe	Richard Okie	October 14, 1984	58601
When Michael's friend's daughter goes into a coma, Michael investigates the crime. Later, Michael finds out she was involved with a Bonzai race. When Michael accepts a Bonsai Racing challenge against a murderous sports car driver/football team owner, he bets KITT as the prize.
51	5	"Halloween Knight"	Winrich Kolbe	Bill Nuss	October 28, 1984	58624
While recovering from being sick, Bonnie witnesses a gorilla murdering a female neighbor. After witnessing the crime she is haunted by strange happenings staged to run her out of her apartment, like seeing the victim's body in her bathtub and a floating demon head talking backwards in her apartment's bathroom mirror. Who would want to scare Bonnie, why was the woman killed for and what is the murderer's reason? Only Michael and KITT can piece the clues together and save Bonnie from suffering the same fate as her neighbor.
52	6	"K.I.T.T. vs. K.A.R.R."	Winrich Kolbe	Richard C. Okie	November 4, 1984	58617
A young beachcombing couple, John Stanton (a marine mechanic) and his girlfriend Mandy, discover KARR (who supposedly blew up before the end of "Trust Doesn't Rust") buried in the sand. John fetches his truck and pulls KARR out, who then activates on his own. Before taking the car for a spin, John promises Mandy he'll take it to the police, but KARR (now voiced by Paul Frees) reveals himself and convinces John to hide him. Elsewhere, KITT and Michael pick up a strange signal identical to one used by KITT. They track the source and find KARR alive and well. The duo give chase, but KARR gets away. Later, John hides KARR at the marina while Michael does legwork around town to find him. John's boss Eddie scolds him for leaving a marina truck by the beach. He tells John he would take $5,000 down for his business. Later, Michael gets suspicious when he meets Mandy and senses she may be lying about her boyfriend, who slips out the back when he arrives. Meanwhile, KARR tampers with Eddie's pacemaker. KARR decides to get some parts from the Knight Mobile Unit. KARR and John turbo boost into the trailer and find Bonnie and Devon working on the laser used to stop him during their first encounter, and John takes it. After John modifies KARR's appearance with a black and silver paintwork to differ from KITT, KARR tampers with an ATM and gives John the money. Later, Eddie recovers, and John gives him the money for his business, and Eddie demands to know where and how John got the money. John shows him KARR, and when KARR talks, Eddie is amazed, and tells John they could use KARR to get rich by knocking off "bigger targets" like an armored truck full of gold. Eddie explains to KARR that gold equals money, which means parts and a mechanic to keep KARR running. KARR concedes, but John wants no part of it and walks away. KARR tells Eddie to let him go.
53	7	"The Rotten Apples"	Robert E.L. Bralver	Story by : Peter L. Dixon; Teleplay by : Gerald Sanford	November 11, 1984	58611
Michael helps a psychologist, who operates a ranch for troubled kids, and is being run out by angry townsfolk and corrupt sheriffs. As Michael investigates further, he learns that the ranch sits above a deposit of minerals worth millions.
54	8	"Knight in Disgrace"	Harvey Laidman	Simon Muntner	November 18, 1984	58622
Michael is suspended for his behavior, and FLAG searches for a replacement for him. Michael gains a crime lord's trust by pretending to be a drug dealer, but the boss (John Considine) sends him to steal an electronic key from Devon. KITT, who is made unaware of Michael's scheme, refuses to help, believing Michael has really turned into a criminal. Michael ends up shooting Devon to get the key and manually driving KITT to get to the "vault" containing a biological weapon. While in the vault, it is revealed that Michael and Devon (who was not killed by the shot) planned the whole thing, and Michael stops the crime lord from selling it. He also saves a woman and reunites her with her daughter, who was held captive by the crime lord in order to keep her with him. Guest stars: Ken Foree (Dawn of the Dead)
55	9	"Dead of Knight"	Bernard L. Kowalski	Story by : Janis Hendler & Tom Greene; Teleplay by : Peter Baloff & David W. Wollert	December 2, 1984	58607
Someone is trying to kill Michael, but who? After the first attempt on his life fails, the assassin tries again with poison, but his dancer friend Cindy ingests the poison in a glass of orange juice meant for Michael. He races to save her life by finding the assassin in Mexico and recovering an antidote after being injected with the poison as well. KITT uses a new comedy sub-routine to keep Michael alive when pursuing the antidote. In the end, Michael gets the antidote in time to save both his and Cindy's life.
56	10	"Lost Knight"	Sidney Hayers	Robert Foster & James M. Miller	December 9, 1984	58619
While in pursuit of thieves who stole explosives the Foundation designed, Michael and KITT become separated after a high power line damages KITT's memory. KITT wanders around aimlessly until a young boy (played by a young Jason Bateman) finds and befriends him. The boy, however, witnesses the thieves plan to use the explosive and the gang gives pursuit, and KITT tries to protect him. Michael must restore KITT's memory in time to save the boy and thwart the gang's plan.
57	11	"Knight of the Chameleon"	Winrich Kolbe	Robert Sherman	December 16, 1984	58631
Michael pursues a master of disguise thief known as the "Chameleon" (Dick Gautier), who has stolen a secret jet pack from the military. Can Michael stop the thief before he strikes again?
58	12	"Custom Made Killer"	Harvey Laidman	Burton Armus	January 6, 1985	58640
Michael hunts down a customized car and its killer driver who have been hired by an extortionist wanting to bring down a garment trading business and eliminate his competition.
59	13	"Knight by a Nose"	Bernard McEveety	William Elliott	January 13, 1985	58604
Michael investigates the death of a prize race horse which he suspects is a cover up by the owner in order to get out of an enormous gambling debt.
60	14	"Junk Yard Dog"	Georg Fenady	Calvin Clements Jr.	February 3, 1985	58641
Michael tries to expose the illegal activities of an owner (Ramon Bieri) of a toxic waste dump. KITT is dumped into and destroyed in an acid pit and rebuilt, but he has trouble facing his fears. With Michael's help, he regains his spirit and goes for the final showdown against the waste dump owner, who is trying to burn the dump to the ground to remove the evidence.
61	15	"Buy Out"	Jeffrey Hayden	George S. Dinallo	February 10, 1985	58643
Hoping to expose a saboteur, Michael volunteers to drive a high-tech armored limo while the developers test it against a missile strike.
62	16	"Knightlines"	Charles Watson Sanford	Richard Okie	March 3, 1985	58644
Michael investigates the death of a construction worker on the site of a future government hi-tech company. Michael suspects a cover up between the site foreman and supervisor, and evidence that someone wants the dead worker appear to have gone rogue. The mastermind of everything going on is an elusive international criminal who planted listening/explosive devices to acquire the company's secret and destroy any evidence of his involvement.
63	17	"The Nineteenth Hole"	Georg Fenady	Gerald Sanford & Robert Foster	March 10, 1985	58627
Michael infiltrates a rally race to investigate death threats made against the race sponsor. The culprit is a group of mobsters who use the town's local hotel as an annual meeting place, while also concealing a dark secret within the town by the mobsters.
64	18	"Knight & Knerd"	Georg Fenady	Larry Mollin	March 17, 1985	58630
A nerdy Foundation employee (Arye Gross) helps Michael rescue a scientist's daughter from criminals who also steal the scientist's advanced laser weapon to rob a jewel depository.
65	19	"Ten Wheel Trouble"	Robert Bralver	Burton Armus	March 24, 1985	58645
Michael helps a convoy of truckers fight a ruthless competition by a rival corporation when a trucker is killed and another is framed for the crime.
66	20	"Knight in Retreat"	Roy Campanella Jr.	Gerald Sanford	March 29, 1985	58642
Michael poses as a scientist to infiltrate a resort operated by a woman (Ann Turkel) who deals in blackmail and stolen advance weapon technology after a friend of Bonnie's, also a guest of the resort, was killed.
67	21	"Knight Strike"	Georg Fenady	George S. Dinallo	April 5, 1985	58647
Michael infiltrates a survivalist convention where stolen laser weapons are being sold. Judy Landers makes her second Knight Rider appearance.
68	22	"Circus Knights"	Harvey Laidman	David R. Toddman	May 5, 1985	58633
Michael and KITT join a circus as a daredevil act in order to discover who is forcing them into bankruptcy.
