= List of Knight Rider (1982 TV series) episodes =

Knight Rider, an American television series, originally aired from 1982 to 1986, spanning four seasons and 90 episodes. The series was broadcast on NBC and starred David Hasselhoff as Michael Knight, a high-tech modern-day knight fighting crime with the help of KITT, an advanced, artificially intelligent and nearly-indestructible car.

The plot follows Michael Knight and KITT as they are sent on missions by the privately held "Foundation for Law and Government" (FLAG) in situations where "direct action might provide the only feasible solution".

== Series overview ==
Season	Episodes	Originally released	
Season	Episodes	First released	Last released
1	22	September 26, 1982	May 6, 1983
2	24	October 2, 1983	May 27, 1984
3	22	September 30, 1984	May 5, 1985
4	22	September 20, 1985	April 4, 1986

== Episodes ==
=== Season 1 (1982–83) ===
No. overall	No. in season	Title	Directed by	Written by	Original release date	Prod. code
1	1	"Knight of the Phoenix"	Daniel Haller	Glen A. Larson	September 26, 1982	57375
2	2	"Knight of the Phoenix"	Daniel Haller	Glen A. Larson	September 26, 1982	57376
3	3	"Deadly Maneuvers"	Paul Stanley	William Schmidt & Bob Shayne	October 1, 1982	57305
4	4	"Good Day at White Rock"	Daniel Haller	Deborah Davis	October 8, 1982	57303
5	5	"Slammin' Sammy's Stunt Show Spectacular"	Bruce Bilson	E. Paul Edwards & John Alan Schwartz	October 22, 1982	57315
6	6	"Just My Bill"	Sidney Hayers	Story by : Catherine Bacos; Teleplay by : Deborah Davis & David Braff	October 29, 1982	57311
7	7	"Not a Drop to Drink"	Virgil W. Vogel	Hannah L. Shearer	November 5, 1982	57304
8	8	"No Big Thing"	Bernard L. Kowalski	Judy Burns	November 12, 1982	57313
9	9	"Trust Doesn't Rust"	Paul Stanley	Steven E. De Souza	November 19, 1982	57307
10	10	"Inside Out"	Peter Crane	Steven E. De Souza	November 26, 1982	57302
11	11	"The Final Verdict"	Bernard Kowalski	Story by : Tom Greene and John Alan Schwartz & E. Paul Edwards; Teleplay by : John Alan Schwartz & E. Paul Edwards	December 3, 1982	57316
12	12	"A Plush Ride"	Sidney Hayers	Gregory S. Dinallo	December 10, 1982	57306
13	13	"Forget Me Not"	Gil Bettman	Story by : Chris Lucky and Richard Christian Matheson & Thomas Szollosi; Teleplay by : Richard Christian Matheson & Thomas Szollosi and Karen Harris & Deborah Davis	December 17, 1982	57312
14	14	"Hearts of Stone"	Jeffrey Hayden	Robert Foster	January 14, 1983	57322
15	15	"Give Me Liberty… or Give Me Death"	Bernard L. Kowalski	David Braff	January 21, 1983	57323
16	16	"The Topaz Connection"	Alan Myerson	Stephen Katz	January 28, 1983	57321
17	17	"A Nice, Indecent Little Town"	Gil Betteman	Frank Telford	February 18, 1983	57317
18	18	"Chariot of Gold"	Bernard L. Kowalski	William Schmidt	February 25, 1983	57326
19	19	"White Bird"	Winrich Kolbe	Virginia Aldridge	March 4, 1983	57330
20	20	"Knight Moves"	Christian I. Nyby II	William Schmidt	March 11, 1983	57332
21	21	"Nobody Does It Better"	Harvey Laidman	David Braff	April 29, 1983	57331
22	22	"Short Notice"	Robert Foster	Robert Foster	May 6, 1983	57336

=== Season 2 (1983–84) ===
No. overall	No. in season	Title	Directed by	Written by	Original release date	Prod. code
23	1	"Goliath"	Winrich Kolbe	Robert Foster & Robert W. Gilmer	October 2, 1983	57875
24	2	"Goliath"	Winrich Kolbe	Robert Foster & Robert W. Gilmer	October 2, 1983	57876
25	3	"Brother's Keeper"	Sidney Hayers	E.F. Wallengren	October 9, 1983	57805
26	4	"Merchants of Death"	Alan Myerson	William Schmidt	October 16, 1983	57807
27	5	"Blind Spot"	Bernard L. Kowalski	Jackson Gillis	October 23, 1983	57809
28	6	"Return to Cadiz"	Alan Myerson	Story by : Larry Forrester; Teleplay by : Sonny Mathias	October 30, 1983	57801
29	7	"K.I.T.T. the Cat"	Jeffrey Hayden	Janis Hendler	November 6, 1983	57824
30	8	"Custom K.I.T.T."	Georg Fenady	Story by : William Schmidt & Robert Specht; Teleplay by : William Schmidt	November 13, 1983	57821
31	9	"Soul Survivor"	Harvey Laidman	Robert Foster & Robert W. Gilmer	November 27, 1983	57829
32	10	"Ring of Fire"	Winrich Kolbe	Janis Hendler	December 4, 1983	57810
33	11	"Knightmares"	Sidney Hayers	Tom Greene & Janis Hendler	December 11, 1983	57830
34	12	"Silent Knight"	Bruce Kessler	Story by : Stephen B. Katz; Teleplay by : Robert W. Gilmer & Janis Hendler	December 18, 1983	57817
35	13	"A Knight in Shining Armor"	Bernard McEveety	Janis Hendler & Tom Greene	January 8, 1984	57832
36	14	"Diamonds Aren't a Girl's Best Friend"	Jeffrey Hayden	Robert Foster & Robert W. Gilmer	January 15, 1984	57833
37	15	"White-Line Warriors"	Bob Bralver	Richard Okie	January 29, 1984	57828
38	16	"Race for Life"	Georg Fenady	Bruce Belland & Roy M. Rogosin	February 5, 1984	57826
39	17	"Speed Demons"	Bruce Seth Green	Tom Greene & Janis Hendler	February 12, 1984	57837
40	18	"Goliath Returns"	Winrich Kolbe	Robert Foster & Robert W. Gilmer and Tom Greene & Janis Hendler	February 19, 1984	57879
41	19	"Goliath Returns"	Winrich Kolbe	Robert Foster & Robert W. Gilmer and Tom Greene & Janis Hendler	February 19, 1984	57880
42	20	"A Good Knight's Work"	Sidney Hayers	Richard Okie	March 4, 1984	57840
43	21	"Mouth of the Snake" "All That Glitters"	Winrich Kolbe	Robert Foster & Robert W. Gilmer	April 8, 1984	57877
44	22	"Mouth of the Snake" "All That Glitters"	Winrich Kolbe	Robert Foster & Robert W. Gilmer	April 8, 1984	57878
45	23	"Let It Be Me"	Bernard McEveety	Story by : William Elliott; Teleplay by : Robert Foster & Robert W. Gilmer	May 13, 1984	57834
46	24	"Big Iron"	Bernard L. Kowalski	Julie Friedgen	May 27, 1984	57804

=== Season 3 (1984–85) ===
No. overall	No. in season	Title	Directed by	Written by	Original release date	Prod. code
47	1	"Knight of the Drones"	Sidney Hayers	Robert Foster & Gerald Sanford	September 30, 1984	58675
48	2	"Knight of the Drones"	Sidney Hayers	Robert Foster & Gerald Sanford	September 30, 1984	58676
49	3	"The Ice Bandits"	Georg Fenady	Gerald Sanford	October 7, 1984	58603
50	4	"Knights of the Fast Lane"	Winrich Kolbe	Richard Okie	October 14, 1984	58601
51	5	"Halloween Knight"	Winrich Kolbe	Bill Nuss	October 28, 1984	58624
52	6	"K.I.T.T. vs. K.A.R.R."	Winrich Kolbe	Richard C. Okie	November 4, 1984	58617
53	7	"The Rotten Apples"	Robert E.L. Bralver	Story by : Peter L. Dixon; Teleplay by : Gerald Sanford	November 11, 1984	58611
54	8	"Knight in Disgrace"	Harvey Laidman	Simon Muntner	November 18, 1984	58622
55	9	"Dead of Knight"	Bernard L. Kowalski	Story by : Janis Hendler & Tom Greene; Teleplay by : Peter Baloff & David W. Wollert	December 2, 1984	58607
56	10	"Lost Knight"	Sidney Hayers	Robert Foster & James M. Miller	December 9, 1984	58619
57	11	"Knight of the Chameleon"	Winrich Kolbe	Robert Sherman	December 16, 1984	58631
58	12	"Custom Made Killer"	Harvey Laidman	Burton Armus	January 6, 1985	58640
59	13	"Knight by a Nose"	Bernard McEveety	William Elliott	January 13, 1985	58604
60	14	"Junk Yard Dog"	Georg Fenady	Calvin Clements Jr.	February 3, 1985	58641
61	15	"Buy Out"	Jeffrey Hayden	George S. Dinallo	February 10, 1985	58643
62	16	"Knightlines"	Charles Watson Sanford	Richard Okie	March 3, 1985	58644
63	17	"The Nineteenth Hole"	Georg Fenady	Gerald Sanford & Robert Foster	March 10, 1985	58627
64	18	"Knight & Knerd"	Georg Fenady	Larry Mollin	March 17, 1985	58630
65	19	"Ten Wheel Trouble"	Robert Bralver	Burton Armus	March 24, 1985	58645
66	20	"Knight in Retreat"	Roy Campanella Jr.	Gerald Sanford	March 29, 1985	58642
67	21	"Knight Strike"	Georg Fenady	George S. Dinallo	April 5, 1985	58647
68	22	"Circus Knights"	Harvey Laidman	David R. Toddman	May 5, 1985	58633

=== Season 4 (1985–86) ===
No. overall	No. in season	Title	Directed by	Written by	Original release date	Prod. code
69	1	"Knight of the Juggernaut"	Georg Fenady	Robert Foster & Burton Armus	September 20, 1985	60275
70	2	"Knight of the Juggernaut"	Georg Fenady	Robert Foster & Burton Armus	September 20, 1985	60276
71	3	"K.I.T.T. Nap"	Bernard McEveety	Skip Webster	September 27, 1985	60216
72	4	"Sky Knight"	Jeffrey Hayden	Carlton Hollander & Dennis Rodriguez	October 18, 1985	60219
73	5	"Burial Ground"	Chuck Bail	Michael Eric Stein	October 25, 1985	60204
74	6	"The Wrong Crowd"	Chuck Bail	George S. Dinallo	November 1, 1985	60221
75	7	"Knight Sting"	Sidney Hayers	Herman Miller	November 8, 1985	60224
76	8	"Many Happy Returns"	Georg Fenady	Michael Halperin	November 15, 1985	60203
77	9	"Knight Racer"	Charles Watson Sanford	Paul Diamond	November 22, 1985	60222
78	10	"Knight Behind Bars"	Bernard McEveety	Richard Okie	December 6, 1985	60202
79	11	"Knight Song"	Georg Fenady	Burton Armus	December 13, 1985	60230
80	12	"The Scent of Roses"	Sidney Hayers	E. Nick Alexander	January 3, 1986	60212
81	13	"Killer K.I.T.T."	Chuck Bail	Simon Rose	January 10, 1986	60226
82	14	"Out of the Woods"	Harvey Laidman	Gregory S. Dinallo	January 17, 1986	60211
83	15	"Deadly Knightshade"	Sidney Hayers	Philip John Taylor	January 24, 1986	60229
84	16	"Redemption of a Champion"	Chuck Bail	E. Nick Alexander	January 31, 1986	60227
85	17	"Knight of a Thousand Devils"	Gino Grimaldi	Peter Allan Fields	February 7, 1986	60228
86	18	"Hills of Fire"	Robert Bralver	Jackson Gillis	February 14, 1986	60220
87	19	"Knight Flight to Freedom"	Winrich Kolbe	George S. Dinallo	February 21, 1986	60232
88	20	"Fright Knight"	Gilbert Shilton	Story by : James Byrnes & Samm Smith; Teleplay by : James Byrnes & Samm Smith & Leonard Kaufman	March 7, 1986	60223
89	21	"Knight of the Rising Sun"	Winrich Kolbe	Story by : Burton Armus & Bruce Lansbury; Teleplay by : E. Nick Alexander	March 14, 1986	60233
90	22	"Voo Doo Knight"	Georg Fenady	Story by : R. Timothy Kring; Teleplay by : R. Timothy Kring & Deborah Dean Davis	April 4, 1986	60225
