= Arthur Abrams =

Arthur Abrams may refer to:

- Arthur Abrams, character in Knight Rider (season 2)
- Artie Abrams, character in Glee
- Art Abrams, co-founder of the Cauliflower Alley Club
