= Shout (film) =

1991 film by Jeffrey Hornaday

- Theatrical release poster
- Directed by: Jeffrey Hornaday
- Written by: Joe Gayton
- Produced by: Robert Simonds
- Starring: James Walters; Heather Graham; Richard Jordan; Linda Fiorentino; John Travolta
- Cinematography: Robert Brinkmann
- Edited by: Seth Flaum
- Music by: Randy Edelman
- Production company: Robert Simonds Productions
- Distributed by: Universal Pictures
- Release date: October 4, 1991
- Running time: 89 minutes
- Country: United States
- Language: English
- Budget: $11 million
- Box office: $3,547,684

Shout is a 1991 American musical romance film directed by Jeffrey Hornaday and starring John Travolta as Jack Cabe, a music teacher who introduces rock and roll to a West Texas home for boys in 1955.

The film also features James Walters, Heather Graham, Richard Jordan, Linda Fiorentino, Scott Coffey, Charles Taylor and Glenn Quinn, as well as an early role for Gwyneth Paltrow.

== Plot ==
Jesse Tucker and his four friends live at Benedict Boys Home, under the strict guidance of headmaster Eugene Benedict, who has a daughter Sara. Newcomer music teacher Jack Cabe introduces them to rock and roll, until headmaster Benedict threatens to fire Cabe. Cabe instructs the boys to get a radio and listen to the show Midnight Rider. Jesse bets with the guys that he would have sex with Sara but instead falls in love with her.

The boys go to the club where they see people enjoying rock and roll to the hilt; Jesse gets inspired and gives an impressive performance on stage. Cabe gets into an altercation with the town sheriff Travis Parker, who decides to find the truth about his past.

At school, Jesse and his friends connect with the girls while attending a lecture on the corrupting effects of modern music and television. Bradley, one of the guys who is attracted to Sara, tells her about the bet. After her initial anger, she is won over by Jesse by his honest demeanor and truth.

Cabe is discovered to be a murderer on the run and flees the police. Jesse steals Eugene's car and goes to Cabe, where Cabe confesses to killing a man while defending his black friend in a club where they were performing. Jesse asks him to stop running but Cabe rejects his advice.

The Benedict Boys band is scheduled to play at a fair and they begin with usual music but upon seeing Cabe surrendering to police, Jesse starts playing rock and roll to the delight of young people and disapproval of the adults. Benedict unsuccessfully tries to stop the band while Sara resumes her relationship with Jesse.

== Cast ==
- John Travolta as Jack Cabe
- James Walters as Jesse Tucker
- Heather Graham as Sara Benedict
- Richard Jordan as Eugene Benedict
- Linda Fiorentino as Molly
- Scott Coffey as Bradley
- Glenn Quinn as Alan
- Frank von Zerneck as Toby
- Michael Bacall as Big Boy
- Sam Hennings as Sheriff Travis Parker
- Gwyneth Paltrow as Rebecca
- Charles Taylor as Deputy
- Redmond Gleeson as Minister
- Renee Tenison as Bar Girl
- Michelle Johnston as Loretta
- Linda Womack as Singer
- Cecil Womack as Lead Singer
- Jeremy Jackson as Bell Ringer
- James Avery as Midnight Rider (voice)

== Reception ==
The film was poorly received by critics. On Rotten Tomatoes, it has a 20% approval rating based on 5 reviews, with an average score of 4/10. John Travolta was nominated for a Golden Raspberry Award for Worst Supporting Actor at the 12th Golden Raspberry Awards.
