= Code of Vengeance =

American television program (1985)

- Title card for the 1985 TV movie
- Also known as: Dalton and Dalton's Code of Vengeance
- Genre: Action/Adventure
- Created by: Robert Foster
- Starring: Charles Taylor
- Composer: Don Peake
- Country of origin: United States
- Original language: English
- No. of seasons: 1
- No. of episodes: Pilot plus 4 episodes

Production
- Production company: Universal Television

Original release
- Network: NBC
- Release: June 30, 1985 – August 24, 1986

Code of Vengeance is the umbrella title for a series of American television programs, produced by Universal Television, that aired on NBC in 1985 and 1986. Charles Taylor stars as David Dalton, a Vietnam veteran who has become a drifter, travelling across the United States in a camper van with only his dog for company. Dalton gets involved in the personal lives of the people he meets and uses his fighting skills to help them win justice.

The Dalton character was created for Mouth of the Snake, the backdoor pilot aired as a second-season episode of Knight Rider in 1984. The character, originally a suave government agent, was retooled as a lone drifter for a new pilot, which aired as the television movie Code of Vengeance, to surprise ratings success in June 1985. A subsequent series, to be called Dalton, was ordered by NBC for midseason, then production was cancelled after just four episodes were completed. These aired in the summer of 1986 as a television movie titled Dalton: Code of Vengeance II and as a part of a fill-in series called Dalton's Code of Vengeance.

== Origins ==
The David Dalton character was originally created by writer Robert Foster and executive producer Glen A. Larson for a proposed series titled All That Glitters. The show's two-hour backdoor pilot aired on April 8, 1984. The production featured Charles Taylor as David Dalton, an action-oriented government agent, and Joanna Pettet as Joanna St. John, the widow of a murdered lawyer, fighting crime and accepting secret missions from Archibald Hendley (played by George Murdock) on behalf of the United States Department of Justice.

This backdoor pilot was written by Robert Gilmer and Robert Foster, directed by Winrich Kolbe, and produced by Robert Gilmer, Gian Grimaldi, and Tom Greene. Cinematography was handled by H. John Penner with art direction by Russell Smith and music by Don Peake. Both Glen A. Larson and Robert Foster were credited as executive producers on the project.

Feeling the format was too similar to Cover Up, a show Larson had created for CBS that began airing in September 1984, NBC declined to pick up All That Glitters as a series.

== Second pilot ==
NBC commissioned a second pilot starring Charles Taylor, Code of Vengeance, for the 1985 pilot season. The new pilot reimagined David Dalton as a flashback-prone Vietnam veteran who drifts across the country, encountering people in trouble, and helping them to find justice with his unique fighting skills. The physical agility, acrobatic skill, and martial arts expertise that Dalton displayed in "Mouth of the Snake" was toned down to a simpler, more violent fighting style. The reviewer for the Associated Press described Dalton as "a modern version of Shane" that's also "like Highway to Heaven" but with Dalton using "his fists rather than good deeds" to solve problems. Dalton travels from place to place in a camper van with only his German Shepherd named "Wichita" for company.

Charles Taylor as Dalton in the 1985 Code of Vengeance television movie

In this second pilot, Dalton is a "mysterious stranger" who arrives in a small town in Arizona where he meets Nadine Flowers, a young mother (played by Erin Gray), her son A.J. (Chad Allen), and her mother Ione (Lenka Peterson). Nadine hires Dalton to complete an addition to her house left undone after her brother disappeared while hunting. When the brother turns up dead under suspicious circumstances, Dalton investigates then sets out to avenge the brother's murder. This act of justice entangles him in a conflict between warring rival drug smugglers and gun runners along the border between Arizona and Mexico. Other prominent cast members included Charles Haid as "Jim Blanton", Keenan Wynn as "Willis", Randall "Tex" Cobb as "Willard Singleton", and Joe Dorsey as "Chief Milford Carsworth". In a nod to the show's origins, Keenan Wynn's character is shown watching a Knight Rider episode, with KITT's voice clearly audible, as armed thugs surround his home. The teleplay was written by Robert Foster with Duke Callaghan and Thomas Del Ruth splitting cinematography duties under director Rick Rosenthal. Robert Foster served as executive producer and the pilot was produced by Universal Television.

NBC also declined to pick up this pilot as a series and shelved the film to be burned off during the summer of 1985. The pilot was eventually aired on June 30, 1985, as the NBC Sunday Night Movie, opposite a new two-hour special episode of Call to Glory starring Craig T. Nelson.

== Series ==
=== Ordered for mid-season ===
Promoted as being "in the tradition of Rambo" and airing just weeks after Rambo: First Blood Part II was released to theaters, the Code of Vengeance telemovie was a surprise ratings success. Code of Vengeance tied an episode of the popular sitcom Family Ties as the second-highest rated show of the week. Swayed by these numbers, NBC ordered six one-hour episodes as a midseason replacement series. The October 1985 announcement noted that the new series was to be titled Dalton.

The series, described by its lead actor as having "two stars — the landscape and Dalton", began filming in several locations across the United States. While the plan was to film two episodes in each location, the production was troubled by weather as flash flooding delayed filming in Houston and a hurricane hit while filming in New Orleans.

=== Shut down ===
Originally slated for a January 1986 debut, Dalton struggled with script and production issues that delayed its debut indefinitely. Unhappy with what they had seen so far, NBC ordered a suspension of production in December 1985 after just four episodes had been filmed. Scheduled to resume filming in Los Angeles in January 1986 after a holiday break, the network instead ended production on Dalton entirely and in early February ordered Universal Television to re-edit these four completed episodes into two feature-length movies. These "movie of the week" presentations were to be called Code of Vengeance II and Code of Vengeance III.

=== Movie of the week ===
The first of these two-hour presentations, now titled Dalton: Code of Vengeance II, aired as the NBC Sunday Night Movie on Sunday, May 11, 1986. Combining episodes written by Luther Murdock and Aiken Woodruff, Dalton: Code of Vengeance II found Dalton travelling first to Houston, Texas, to help friend Jeanne Bennett (played by Karen Landry) locate her husband—his former commanding officer, Major Monty Bennett (Donnelly Rhodes). When he discovers that Major Bennett is now aiding the New Patriots, a conservative paramilitary group of Vietnam veterans bent on overthrowing the United States government, he sets off for the Florida Everglades to stop them. The New Patriots' plan is to commit acts of domestic terrorism while framing an Arab group for the atrocities in the belief that this will allow them to seize control of the government they feel betrayed them in Vietnam. Ultimately, Dalton confronts his former commander in the swamp and, after a long and unexplained flashback sequence of combat in Vietnam, Dalton stops both his commander and the group's plans.

This Universal Television movie was produced by Herman Miller, edited by Lawrence J. Vallario, scored by Don Peake, and Jack Priestley was the cinematographer. Gary A. Lee handled art direction and, with creator Robert Foster no longer involved, Lou Shaw was the only credited executive producer. Direction of the combined feature edit of these two episodes, filmed on location in Houston, Texas, and Jacksonville, Florida, is credited pseudonymously to Alan Smithee. Other prominent roles in the movie included Ed Bruce as "Sheriff Johnson", Alex Harvey as "Sheriff Willoughby", Mitch Pileggi as "Verbeck", Shannon Stein as "Tip Bennett", Belinda J. Montgomery as "Libby Holland", and William Sanderson as "Bobby Fuller".

Critical reaction to this iteration of the Dalton saga was sharp. Drew Fetherston, reviewing the movie for Newsday, called it "claptrap" and that "action [...] is all that this NBC stinker has to offer". Faye Zuckerman of the Gainesville Sun called Dalton: Code of Vengeance II a "plodder", complaining that "this film insults its predecessor". Chicago Sun-Times reviewer Daniel Ruth gave Dalton: Code of Vengeance II a half-star review calling it "revisionist", "distasteful", and "terrible television". Deriding the film as "poorly written, badly acted, sloppily directed and choppily edited", he called it "another slap in the face of the men and women who went to Southeast Asia to do a dirty job and came home to even dirtier exploitation". Ruth concluded, "The viewer's best "Code of Vengeance" would be to reject these films."

Dalton: Code of Vengeance II also failed to deliver the high ratings of its predecessor. Against stiff competition from the final installment of ABC's top-rated North and South, Book II miniseries, the movie failed to crack the top 20 in that week's Nielsen ratings. Faced with critical and commercial failure, NBC scrapped plans to air Code of Vengeance III and the fate of the unseen episodes became uncertain.

=== Replacement series ===
In the summer of 1986, NBC was doing quite well in the ratings with its Thursday night lineup but was still experimenting on other nights. One such experiment was the anthology series The New Alfred Hitchcock Presents featuring new stories introduced by colorized vintage footage of Alfred Hitchcock. After just one season on the network, the show was cancelled abruptly after the July 20, 1986 airing of two repeat episodes placed 55th for the week in the Nielsen ratings against 5th-rated Murder, She Wrote on CBS. Needing an inexpensive replacement on short notice as a fill-in until the 1986-87 television season started in September, NBC began airing one-hour episodes of Dalton, re-titled Dalton's Code of Vengeance, in a four-episode limited run beginning on July 27, 1986.

The first one-hour episode of Dalton's Code of Vengeance to air was "Rustler's Moon", one of the two previously unaired hours. Dalton is on his way to Houston when he meets a "feisty rancher" named Rhonda Jo (played by Susan Walden) and is forced to deal out his unique brand of justice against cattle rustlers trying to steal her prize bull and do her harm. Other prominent roles included Larry Drake as "Jack Ferguson", Paul Carr as "Elliot", Chris Douridas as "Willy", and a special appearance by country music star Mickey Gilley as himself. As with the previous presentation, this episode's direction was credited to Alan Smithee.

With little notice or promotion, advance critical reaction was scant. One reviewer noted that star Charles Taylor "has the bod for" an adventure hero while another opined that he thought "Knight Rider or The A-Team or Jonathan of Highway to Heaven took care of these baddies on their series". The debut episode placed 51st for the week, just behind a rerun of Airwolf, with 7.3 ratings points in the Nielsen ratings. The following week, the timeslot was filled by the special Motown Returns to the Apollo hosted by Bill Cosby.

The original two-hour Code of Vengeance television movie was split into two one-hour segments and repeated in two parts as episodes of Dalton's Code of Vengeance. Part one aired on August 10, 1986, and part two aired on August 17, 1986. The first part placed 48th for the week, rated just behind a rerun of The A-Team. The second part also placed 48th for the week with 8.1 ratings points and was seen in an estimated 7 million homes, just one-fifth of the 35 million that tuned in for this film's 1985 debut.

The final airing of Dalton's Code of Vengeance was the final previously unaired hour, an episode titled "The Last Hold Out", which aired on August 24, 1986. Dalton arrives in New Orleans and finds himself the only hope for produce wholesaler Ray Bechet (played by Wandy Ward) and his wife Rose Bechet (Maureen Kedes) being pressured to sell their property by powerful real estate developer Johnson Lee (Jeff Jensen). Prominent guest roles included Barry Settels as "Fante". This final episode placed 43rd for the week with 10.0 ratings points and a 19 ratings share. This rating was good enough to tie pre-season National Football League games on both CBS and ABC but not enough to make NBC consider reviving the Dalton character yet again.

1984 novelization of All That Glitters backdoor pilot

== Home media ==
The double-length second-season Knight Rider episode "Mouth of the Snake", the All That Glitters backdoor pilot, was released on DVD in April 2005 by Universal Home Video as part of the Knight Rider: Season Two set. This episode had been previously released on VHS by Columbia House Home Video.

== In other media ==
The novel Knight Rider: The 24-Carat Assassin, published in September 1984 by Target Books and credited to Glen A. Larson & Roger Hill, was an adaptation of the "Mouth of the Snake" episode. As in the episode, Dalton and St. John are the principal characters with Michael Knight and KITT making only token appearances. Of the five official English language Knight Rider tie-in novels, The 24-Carat Assassin was one of two released in the United Kingdom that was never released in the United States. The novel was translated into German by Carla Blesgen and published by Bertelsmann in Germany in 1988 as Ein Hochkarätiger Killer.

== See also ==
- Knight Rider franchise
