= Charles Taylor (actor) =

American actor

L. Charles Taylor is an American actor best known for the role of David Dalton in the Code of Vengeance television series.

Taylor was born in the United States but he was an "air force brat" who spent his early childhood in Italy and moved frequently around the US. A martial artist, wrestler and football player as a high school student in Detroit, he later attended Oakland University in Michigan where he discovered acting.

Taylor studied at the Hedgerow Theatre in Philadelphia for five years before moving to New York City. In New York, he worked as a bouncer at Studio 54, Regine's, and other nightclubs. After a dangerous encounter with an unruly clubgoer, Taylor moved to California to break into television and motion pictures.

Aside from his starring role in Code of Vengeance, Taylor's other television roles include the movie A Quiet Little Neighborhood, a Perfect Little Murder and appearances in episodes of Knight Rider, Murder, She Wrote, Days of Our Lives, and Starting from Scratch. Taylor has appeared in the films Mask, The Natural History of Parking Lots, Shout, Martial Law 2: Undercover, and Saving Grace B. Jones.
