= Knight Rider (1982 TV series) =

American crime drama television series (1982–1986)

- Genre: Action; Crime
- Created by: Glen A. Larson
- Starring: David Hasselhoff; Edward Mulhare; Patricia McPherson; Rebecca Holden; Peter Parros
- Voices of: William Daniels
- Narrated by: Richard Basehart
- Theme music composer: Stu Phillips; Glen A. Larson
- Composers: Stu Phillips; Don Peake; Morton Stevens
- Country of origin: United States
- Original language: English
- No. of seasons: 4
- No. of episodes: 90 (list of episodes)

Production
- Executive producers: Glen A. Larson; Robert Foster; R.A. Cinader
- Production location: California
- Running time: 48 minutes
- Production companies: Glen A. Larson Productions; Universal Television

Original release
- Network: NBC
- Release: September 26, 1982 – April 4, 1986

Related
- Knight Rider 2000 (1991 TV film); Knight Rider (2008); Code of Vengeance; Team Knight Rider

Knight Rider is an American action crime drama television series created and produced by Glen A. Larson. The series was originally broadcast on NBC from September 26, 1982, to April 4, 1986. The show stars David Hasselhoff as Michael Knight, a sleek and modern crime fighter assisted by KITT, an advanced, artificially intelligent, self-aware, and nearly indestructible car. This was the last series Larson devised at Universal Television before he moved to 20th Century Fox Television. While the series received negative reviews from critics during its initial run, retrospective reviews have been more positive from audiences and critics alike. The series has received a cult following.

== Plot ==
Self-made billionaire Wilton Knight rescues police Detective Lieutenant Michael Arthur Long after a near-fatal gunshot to the face, giving him a new face through plastic surgery and a new identity and name: Michael Knight. Wilton selects Michael as the primary field agent in the pilot program of his public justice organization, the Foundation for Law and Government (FLAG). The other half of this program is the Knight Industries Two Thousand (KITT), a heavily modified, technologically advanced Pontiac Firebird Trans Am with numerous features, including a highly durable shell and frame, controlled by a computer with artificial intelligence. Michael and KITT are brought in during situations where "direct action might provide the only feasible solution".

Heading FLAG is Devon Miles, who takes over after Wilton's death and provides Michael with directives and guidance. Dr. Bonnie Barstow (season 1, 3 and 4) and April Curtis (season 2) are the chief engineers in charge of KITT's care and act as a technical assistant to Devon.

== Cast and characters ==
- David Hasselhoff as Michael Knight (born Michael Arthur Long), an undercover detective of the Los Angeles Police Department who, while on a case in Las Vegas, is shot in the face and nearly killed. Wilton Knight, creator of Knight Industries and founder of FLAG, directs his doctors to save Long's life and reconstruct his face. With his new identity, "Michael Knight", Long is provided with high tech crime-fighting equipment, most notably the car named KITT.

Hasselhoff also played Garthe Knight, Wilton Knight's estranged son and a criminal mastermind who drives Goliath, a Peterbilt 352 Pacemaker semi-truck armed with rockets, and protected by KITT's Molecular Bonded Shell.

- William Daniels as the voice of KITT, or Knight Industries Two Thousand, the autonomous, artificially intelligent car, with whom Michael Knight is partnered. Daniels, who simultaneously starred on St. Elsewhere, requested not to be credited for his role as KITT's voice.
- Edward Mulhare as Devon Miles, the leader of FLAG, who appeared in every episode to provide mission details to Knight and KITT. He was also the spokesman for FLAG whenever it came under scrutiny.
- Patricia McPherson as Dr. Bonnie Barstow (Seasons 1, 3–4), KITT's chief technician who had romantic tension with Michael. The character was dropped after the first season, but due to strong fan reaction and lobbying by Hasselhoff and Mulhare, she was returned for the third season and remained through the end of the series.
- Rebecca Holden as April Curtis (Season 2), chief technician for KITT. The character was written out when Patricia McPherson returned. The connection between the two was never established in any installments.
- Peter Parros as Reginald Cornelius III aka RC3 (Season 4), A former street vigilante who becomes the driver of the FLAG mobile unit and occasional partner for Michael and KITT.
- Richard Basehart as Wilton Knight, the founder of FLAG, who dies in the pilot episode. Basehart's voice, however, is heard throughout the series, narrating over the intro and outro.

== Production ==
=== Vehicle ===
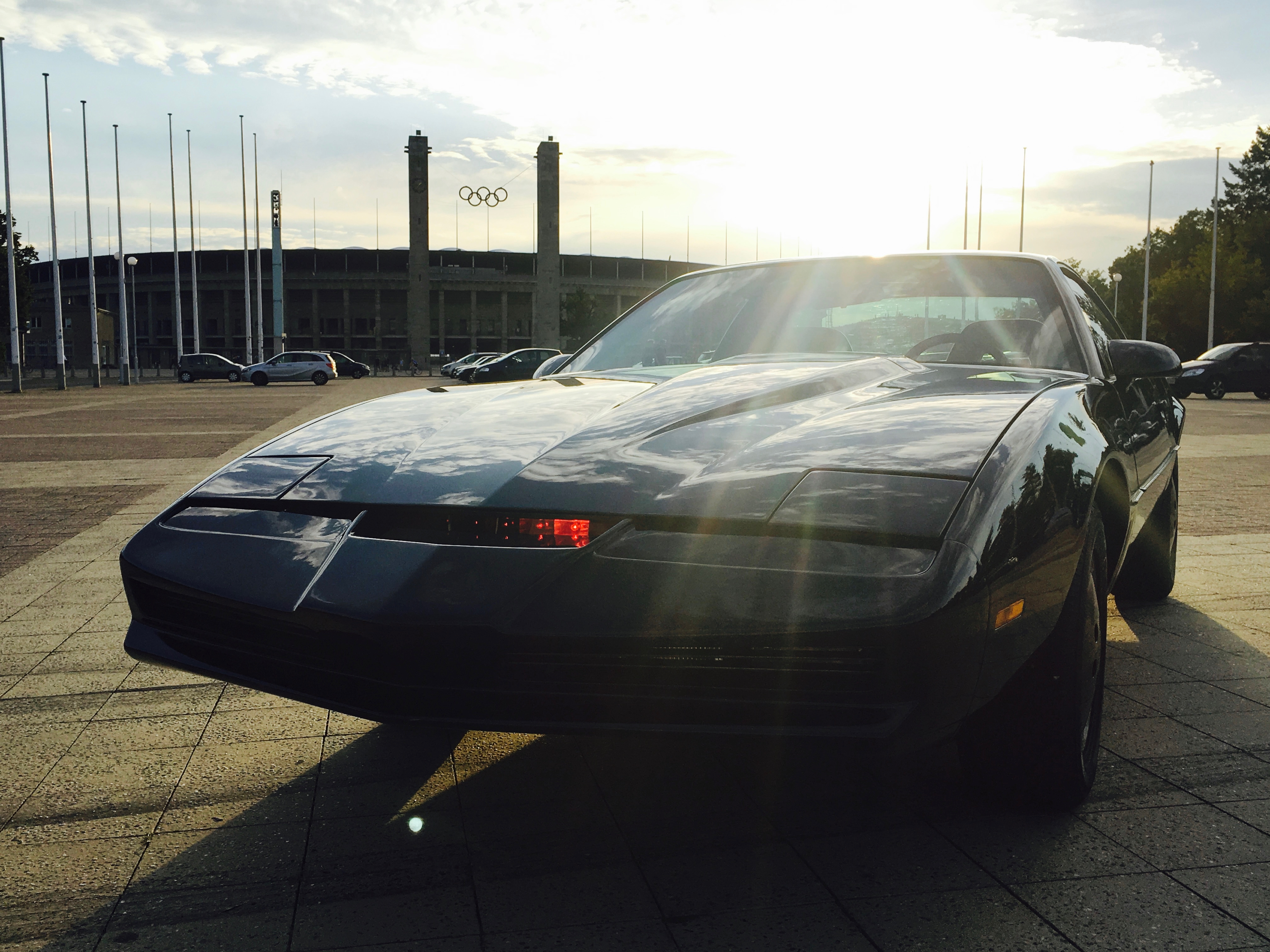
A black Pontiac Firebird Trans Am built to mimic KITT from the TV series Knight Rider.

The car used as KITT in the series was a customized 1982 Pontiac Firebird Trans Am, that cost US$100,000 to build (equivalent to $334,000 in 2025). The nose and dashboard of the car were designed by design consultant Michael Scheffe. The concept of a black Trans Am as the star vehicle was already familiar to audiences through the Smokey and the Bandit film franchise, the third film of which actually featured the same model of Trans Am as Knight Rider albeit without the customizations.

Stuntman Jack Gill says KITT's ride height was dropped 1.5 inches (4 cm) from a stock Trans Am. The principal studio car was the only vehicle that contained the intricate dashboard with the functioning electronic elements. Spare cars were always on hand, and Universal eventually did all of the modifications that were needed. A mock up dashboard was used on a sound stage for closeups of the voice box or other buttons. For continuity reasons, some (but not all) of the stunt cars were fitted with a dummy version of the dashboard which contained fake electronic displays but were shot in a way not to make this obvious to the casual viewer.

Glen Larson wanted the talking muscle car to have a heartbeat and asked Scheffe to design a beam of light like the Cylons had in Battlestar Galactica to be used on the front of the vehicle. The Pontiac's nose was eventually extended slightly, although brief shots of the first version of the car without the extended nose were used in the pilot episode and in the opening credits sequence of Season 1.

Gill said that the studio got the cars from Pontiac for $1 apiece, but Pontiac often gave the studio vehicles that had already been damaged from a train derailment. The only car Universal had to pay for was the principal car.

For the scenes in which KITT appeared to be driving without a driver, Gill would sit behind the driver's seat. Gill would extend his arms and legs through the seat out of sight. A two-way mirror was created that hid Gill during scenes where KITT appeared to be driving solo. KITT was never seen driving for long periods of time solo because of the difficulty of shooting it.

William Daniels, the voice of KITT, would record his lines after the majority of the episode was filmed. Hasselhoff would work with an assistant off-camera who would read him KITT's lines. If KITT was in motion during filming, the lines would be read to Hasselhoff through the car stereo. The vehicle was usually towed during scenes when Hasselhoff appeared to be driving.

The studio held a marketing campaign for Knight Rider. Fans could write to the network and they would receive a pamphlet detailing some features about KITT. The first campaign was held in August 1982. The pamphlet said, "The Competition is NO Competition!" KITT was pictured parked alongside a vehicle that resembled the General Lee from The Dukes of Hazzard.

=== Soundtrack ===
The "Knight Rider Theme" was composed by Stu Phillips and Glen A. Larson. The series DVD bonus material contains an interview about this lead music, where Glen A. Larson says he remembers a theme out of a classical piece ("Marche Et Cortège De Bacchus" Act III – No. 14 from Sylvia written by French composer Léo Delibes) from which he took pieces for the "Knight Rider Theme" and the bass theme from Harry Thumann's 1982 song Sphinx. The decision to use synthesizers was largely a network decision. Larson claims that they used five or six synthesizers, drums and a Fender bass.

The rest of the series music was composed by Stu Phillips for 13 episodes and Don Peake for 75 episodes. Glen A. Larson co-wrote music for one episode and Morton Stevens wrote the music for one episode. Peake took over scoring duties with the 14th episode of season 1, "Hearts of Stone", in 1983, when Larson moved to Twentieth Century-Fox and Phillips was working there on his projects. Peake remained as the series sole composer until the end of the series in 1986.

In 2005, FSM released a disc of music from the series, featuring the series theme, ad bumpers and Phillips' scores for "Knight of the Phoenix" (the pilot), "Not a Drop to Drink", "Trust Doesn't Rust", "Forget Me Not" and the composer's final episode "Inside Out", as well as the logo music for Glen Larson Productions. Albums of Don Peake's scores have also been issued.

== Episodes ==
Season	Episodes	Originally released	
Season	Episodes	First released	Last released
1	22	September 26, 1982	May 6, 1983
2	24	October 2, 1983	May 27, 1984
3	22	September 30, 1984	May 5, 1985
4	22	September 20, 1985	April 4, 1986

The intro throughout most of the episodes began with this narration:

Knight Rider, a shadowy flight into the dangerous world of a man who does not exist.
Michael Knight, a young loner on a crusade to champion the cause of the innocent, the helpless, the powerless in a world of criminals who operate above the law.

During the first season, the outro was Michael and KITT driving on a road in the desert with Wilton Knight's words of "One man can make a difference, Michael." These words were phased out after episode 7, "Not a Drop to Drink".

Then the narration goes on to say:

Michael Knight, a lone crusader in a dangerous world. The world of the Knight Rider.

The outro of seasons 2 and 3 was Michael and KITT driving away from the sunset toward the camera. Season 4's outro was the same, except with KITT in Super Pursuit Mode.

== Critical reception ==
At the time of its initial airing, Knight Rider was panned by critics. On review aggregator Rotten Tomatoes, the first season scores 33%, based mainly on archived contemporaneous reviews, with an average rating of 5.60/10. The site's consensus reads: "This car can do anything -- except paper over how tiresomely silly Knight Rider's concept is." Tom Shales, writing for The Washington Post, commented: "'Knight Rider' is all revved up but has no place to go, except, maybe, headlong into a large brick wall." In contrast, retrospective reviews have been more positive. Marc Bernardin of Entertainment Weekly called the show "a relic from a simpler time, when audiences demanded less from their TV".

== Syndication and home media ==
=== In syndication ===
Knight Rider was first syndicated in the U.S. in fall 1986. Stations were initially offered either the original hour-long format (with three minutes cut from each episode), or severely-condensed into half-hour format. Reruns were later syndicated on USA Network in 1994, Sci-Fi Channel in 2003, Sleuth in 2005, and on G4 in 2012.

=== DVD releases ===
Universal Studios has released all four seasons of Knight Rider on DVD in regions 1, 2 & 4. A complete series box set featuring all 90 episodes in a collector's edition box has been released in regions 1 & 2.

On March 8, 2016, it was announced that Mill Creek Entertainment had acquired the rights to the series in Region 1; they subsequently re-released the first two seasons on DVD on May 3, 2016. On October 4, 2016, Mill Creek re-released Knight Rider - The Complete Series on DVD in Region 1.

=== Blu-ray releases ===
In Japan, NBCUniversal Entertainment Japan—a subsidiary of NBCUniversal—released a Blu-ray box set containing all four seasons, replicas, props, and memorabilia under the title ナイトライダー コンプリート ブルーレイBOX (Knight Rider: The Complete Series). The set is limited to Region Code A, which includes the U.S. It was released on November 27, 2014.

In North America, Mill Creek Entertainment released the complete series on Blu-ray in Region 1 on October 4, 2016.

On December 30, 2022, the German company Turbine Medien worked with Universal to put together Knight Rider: The 40th Anniversary Edition Blu-Ray Collection. This set is a restored uncut version with the original music when it first aired on NBC. The series is on twenty discs, with three bonus discs, and includes bonus features about the series and the Knight Rider 2000 and Knight Rider 2010 movies in SD. Also in SD are all 22 episodes of the series Team Knight Rider. This set was a limited edition. Only 3,939 copies were made.

On November 10, 2023, Turbine Medien made a smaller release called Knight Rider: The Special Edition Set, which includes the first twenty uncut episode Blu-ray discs and the first bonus discs with the interviews.

Universal is to release Knight Rider on 4K Ultra HD Blu-ray in Fall 2025.

=== Digital streaming ===
As of June 17, 2025, the series is available in the United States for free on the ad-supported The Roku Channel, and is available for purchase on Amazon Prime Video, Apple TV+, and Fandango at Home.

== Spin-offs and sequels ==
These adventures were continued with the television films Knight Rider 2000 and Knight Rider 2010 and the short-lived Team Knight Rider. One other television movie, Knight Rider, served as a pilot for the 2008 television series Knight Rider. In 1985, a spin-off series, Code of Vengeance, also premiered.

In 1988, Angelo di Marco made a French comic strip based on the series, titled K2000 and published by Dargaud.

== In popular culture ==
The Knight Rider theme has been sampled in the songs "Clock Strikes" by Timbaland & Magoo featuring Mad Skillz from the album Welcome to Our World (1998), "Turn It Up (Remix) / Fire It Up" by Busta Rhymes from the album When Disaster Strikes... (1997), "Mundian To Bach Ke" by Panjabi MC from the album Legalised (1998), and "Aaahh Men!" by Doja Cat from the album Vie (which was used in Hindi film Dhurandhar: The Revenge (2026), both in teaser as well as in the movie itself). It was also featured as Ted (Seth MacFarlane)'s ringtone for John Bennett (Mark Wahlberg)'s phone in the 2012 comedy film Ted.

A "Fun Pack" based on Knight Rider for the toys-to-life video game Lego Dimensions was released in February 2017. The pack includes a Michael Knight minifigure and constructible KITT, and unlocks additional Knight Rider-themed content in the game.

Zen Studios released a digital pinball table inspired by Knight Rider as part of the Universal Pinball: TV Classics downloadable content with other well-known nostalgic hit NBCUniversal TV shows like Xena: Warrior Princess and Battlestar Galactica.

== See also ==
- 1982 in American television
- Knight Rider (franchise)
- Automan (1983)
- Blue Thunder (1983)
- The A-Team (1983)
- Airwolf (1984)
- Street Hawk (1985)
- The Highwayman (1987)
- Thunder in Paradise (1994)
- Viper (1994)
