= Patricia McPherson =

American actor

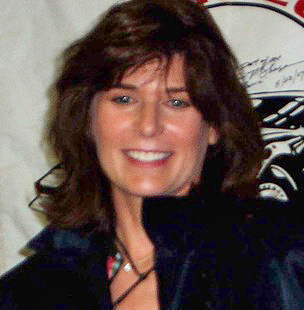
- McPherson in 2004
- Born: 1956 or 1957 (age 69–70); Oak Harbor, Washington, U.S.
- Education: San Diego State University
- Occupation: Actor
- Years active: 1978–1991, 2009
- Known for: Playing Bonnie Barstow in Knight Rider
- Spouse: James Garrett

Patricia McPherson (born 1956 or 1957) is a former American actress and activist best known for her role in the 1980s TV series Knight Rider as Bonnie Barstow.

== Early life ==
McPherson was born in Oak Harbor, Washington. She is the daughter of a naval officer. She graduated from San Diego State University with a degree in advertising.

== Career ==
=== Knight Rider ===
McPherson is best remembered for her role in the 1980s TV series Knight Rider as Bonnie Barstow, KITT's mechanic. She appeared in season one and was absent from season two. She returned in the season three opener.

== Personal life ==
McPherson married James Garrett.

After McPherson retired from acting in the early 1990s, she decided to pursue conserving wildlife and the forests; her efforts have included helping in attempts to preserve the Ballona Wetlands in southern California and working with the Ballona Wetlands Trust to sue the Playa Vista community for failure to take action concerning methane.
