= Winrich Kolbe =

Film director (1940–2012)

- Born: Winrich Ernst Rudolf Kolbe; 1940
- Died: September 2012 (aged 72); United States
- Occupation: Television director · Television producer
- Years active: 1975–2011
- Awards: Hugo Award for Best Dramatic Presentation (1995)

Winrich Ernst Rudolf Kolbe (1940 – September 2012) was a German-American television director and television producer best known for directing 48 episodes of Star Trek across four television series. These included the Hugo Award-winning "All Good Things...", which was the series finale of Star Trek: The Next Generation. He also directed the series premiere of Star Trek: Voyager, "Caretaker", and was involved in the casting of the series.

== Career ==
=== Military service ===
Kolbe was born in 1940. He was drafted during the Vietnam War. He served as an artillery spotter in the army.

=== Television ===
Following his service in the Military he began his career in television during the 1970s, and he was the associate producer for Battlestar Galactica. He also directed an episode of the series, "Baltar's Escape". Prior to his work on Star Trek, he worked on a variety of series including episodes of Knight Rider and Spenser: For Hire starring Avery Brooks, whom he would go on to direct once again in Star Trek: Deep Space Nine.

==== Star Trek ====
Kolbe directed 48 episodes of Star Trek across four series, including The Next Generation (16 episodes), Voyager (18 episodes), Deep Space Nine (13 episodes) and Enterprise (1 episode). These included the series finale of TNG, "All Good Things...", which was awarded the 1995 Hugo Award for Best Dramatic Presentation (long form).

He directed the series premiere of Voyager, "Caretaker", for which he was involved in the casting. One of the most notable issues that he was involved in overseeing was the casting of the Captain, and was one of the staff members pushing for a female Captain against the wishes of Paramount Pictures. He said that "We did make some attempts to look at male actors for the part when time was running out and it seemed that we might have a problem, but every time a male read for Janeway, I couldn't quite get my head into it. There is a difference a woman would bring that we all felt was important." He later said of the casting of Kate Mulgrew after Geneviève Bujold dropped out of the role, "She is very feminine, but she can handle any situation. I would follow her. She really is wonderful."

His sole episode of Enterprise was "Silent Enemy".

=== Teaching ===
He worked as a professor at the Savannah College of Art and Design after he retired from directing in 2003 and retired from that post in 2007.

== Personal life and death ==
During the early years of Voyager, he dated Kate Mulgrew for about three years. He died in September 2012 after several years of failing health. Following his death, a Memorial Award in his name was awarded in 2013 as part of the Savannah College of Art and Design's film and television department's SCADemy Awards.

== Selected filmography ==
- Ice Planet (2001)

=== Television director ===
- 24
- Angel
- Automan
- Hunter
- In the Heat of the Night
- JAG
- Knight Rider
- Lois & Clark: The New Adventures of Superman
- The Rockford Files
- Magnum, P.I.
- Millennium
- Space: Above and Beyond
- Star Trek: Deep Space Nine
- Star Trek: Enterprise
- Star Trek: The Next Generation
- Star Trek: Voyager
- Tales of the Gold Monkey
- Threat Matrix (as Rick Kolbe)
- T.J. Hooker
- Voyagers!
- War of the Worlds

=== Television producer ===
- Battlestar Galactica
- McCloud
- Quincy, M.E.
